= Xenophilia =

Attraction to foreign people, cultures or customs

Xenophilia or xenophily is the love for, attraction to, or appreciation of foreign people, manners, customs, or cultures. It is the antonym of xenophobia or xenophoby. The word is a modern coinage from the Greek "xenos" (ξένος) (stranger, unknown, foreign) and "philia" (φιλία) (love, attraction), though the word itself is not found in classical Greek.

== In biology ==
In biology xenophily includes, for example, the acceptance by an insect of an introduced foreign plant closely related to the normal host. Xenophily is distinguished from xenophagy (or allotrophy), and is less common than xenophoby. Early 20th-century entomologists incorrectly concluded that the evolution of the glandular terminal disk was a function of xenophily, following its discovery in myrmecophilous larvae.

== In culture and politics ==
Cultural appreciation refers to attraction or admiration towards one or more cultures which are not one's own. Individual examples are usually suffixed with -philia, from the Ancient Greek word philia (φιλία), "love, affection". Cultural xenophilia according to some sources can be connected with cultural cringe. It may also be area-specific, such as led the Romans to believe that Greeks were better than Romans at music, art and philosophy, though evidently not better in military matters.

=== National or ethnic xenophilias ===
- Anglophile: a non-English person who is extremely fond of all things English. Antonym: Anglophobe
- Australophile: a fan of Australian culture
- Austrophile: a fan of Austrian culture
- Canadaphile: a fan of Canadian culture. Antonym: Canadaphobe
- Europhile: a person who wants to increase cooperation between governments within the European Union.
- Fennophile: a fan of Finnish culture
- Francophile or Gallophile: a fan of French culture. Antonym: Francophobe
- Germanophile or Teutophile: a fan of German culture. Antonyms: Germanophobe and teutophobia
- Hellenophile: a fan of Greek culture (i.e. someone prone to philhellenism)
- Hibernophile: a lover of Ireland or Irish culture
- Indophile: a fan of India
- Italophile: a fan of Italy. Antonym: Italophobia
- Japanophile: a non-Japanese person with a strong interest in Japan or Japanese culture. Antonym: Japanophobe
- Judeophile or philosemite: a lover of Jews or Jewish culture. Antonyms: Judeophobe and antisemite
- Kartvelophile: an interest for Georgian culture
- Negrophilia: a term used in the 1920s and 30s for the interest in Europe for African and African-American culture
- Persophilia: a fan of Iranian culture
- Russophilia: love of Russia and Russians. Antonym: Russophobe
  - Galician Russophilia was a pro-Russian movement in Galicia and Lodomeria in the late 19th Century
- Sinophile: a non-Chinese person with a strong interest in China or Chinese culture. Antonym: Sinophobe
- Slavophile: a fan of Slavic culture
- Suecophile: someone with a great interest in the Swedish language and culture
- Turkophile: a fan of Turkey and Turkish culture

=== Allophilia ===
Allophilia scale

Positive attitudes towards outgroups can be measured with the allophilia scale.

== In tourism research ==
In tourism research, xenophilia has been operationalised as tourism xenophilia, defined as an individual’s attraction toward the perceived foreignness of a destination. Drawing on social and evolutionary psychology, a measurement scale for the construct was developed across three studies and found to predict tourist and resident behaviours, including willingness to engage with local people at a destination. In this literature xenophilia is distinguished from consumer affinity, which denotes favourable feelings toward one particular foreign country rather than attraction to foreignness in general.

== In religion ==
Rabbi Jonathan Sacks, the English Orthodox Chief Rabbi, philosopher, theologian, and author, posited that xenophilia is deeply ingrained and central to Judaism.

== See also ==
- Allosemitism
- Colonial mentality
- Cultural appropriation
- Exoticism
- Intercultural competence
- Internalized oppression
- Malinchism
- Mongrel complex
- Negrophilia
- Neophile
- Oikophobia
- Racial fetishism
- Reverse discrimination
- Self-hatred
- Xenocentrism
