= Endophobia =

Aversion towards one's own ethnic group

Endophobia is a neologism understood as the aversion or disdain for the cultural identity and/or phenotypical characteristics of one's own ethnic group, as well as individuals from the same nation, either for their nationality or the sociocultural aspects of the idiosyncrasy of their country or region of origin. It is considered the inverse of xenophobia, which is the rejection of what is perceived as foreign or strange.

== Etymology ==
The origin of the term comes from Ancient Greek ἔνδον endon meaning 'inside', and φόβος phobos, meaning 'panic'.

== Considerations ==
To properly speak of endophobia, it is not enough to make a comment or critique about some social or cultural aspect of one’s country or region of origin. There must be a series of attitudes that generate rejection or even hatred towards the elements that constitute a particular culture or ethnicity, understood as part of one’s own identity. These elements may include ways of speaking, the language itself, beliefs such as the predominant religion in the surrounding environment, the national political system, clothing, cuisine, lifestyle, and more. This behavior can even reach pathological levels, causing the individual to be unable to live in peace with themselves or their environment. In many cases, endophobia is also associated with classist and racist prejudices.

From the perspectives of psychology and sociology, this behavior is studied and analyzed as a conduct associated with other factors, such as inferiority complex and low self-esteem, as the individual feels inferior to another civilization, race, or culture that they implicitly or explicitly perceive as superior.

== History ==
Endophobia has been present in many societies throughout history. In Latin America, the emergence of a pigmentocracy as a socioeconomic phenomenon resulting from European colonization of the Americas has caused a certain degree of confrontation and rejection toward the cultural expressions and physical traits of Amerindians, even among individuals who share these attributes, perceiving them as part of an "other" rather than as their own characteristics. For example, in Peru, the term "cholo" is commonly used as a racist pejorative to identify people belonging to the country’s indigenous ethnic groups, and it is even used offensively by individuals who share these characteristics toward their peers.

Another ingrained endophobic sentiment was present among groups of African Americans during and after the period of slavery in the Americas, predominantly affecting individuals from Sub-Saharan Africa. Many rejected or even denied their own skin color and the culture of their ancestors.

From the perspective of Canarian nationalism, criticism has been made about alleged endophobia present in the Canary Islands, rejecting cultural aspects of the Canary aborigines, such as the Guanche people in Tenerife, in favor of the Spanish peninsular culture introduced from the Iberian Peninsula.

In a more radical and recent context, paramilitary forces of ISIS training "Cubs of the Caliphate," youth between the ages of 10 and 15, recruit and indoctrinate them to reject the principles and values of their own culture if they do not align with jihadism. This involves a strict process of censorship in the educational materials they receive.

== See also ==
- Allophilia
- Colonial mentality
- Cultural cringe
- Internalized oppression
  - Internalized ableism
  - Internalized racism
  - Internalized sexism
- Oikophobia
- Outgroup favoritism
- Reverse discrimination
- Self-hatred
- Self-hating Jew
- Social alienation
- Xenocentrism
- Xenophilia
