= Oikophobia =

Aversion to one's home or homeland

Oikophobia (Ancient Greek: οἶκος, romanized: oîkos, lit. 'house, household' + φόβος, phóbos, 'fear'; related to domatophobia and ecophobia) is a tendency to criticise or reject one's own home or home society while praising others. It has been used in political contexts to refer critically to political ideologies that are held to repudiate one's own culture. This usage of the term was popularized by the English conservative writer Roger Scruton in his 2004 book England and the Need for Nations.

In 1808 the English Romantic poet and essayist Robert Southey used it to describe a desire (particularly by the English people) to leave one's home and travel. Southey's usage is a synonym for wanderlust.

It is not used in psychiatry, and is not listed in the DSM-5. If it were, it would be used to narrowly indicate a type of specific phobia or fear of specific items contained in a house, (e.g. appliances, bathtubs and electric switches) but not the fear of a house itself, which is domatophobia. In the post-Second World War era in West Germany, some commentators used the term to refer to a "fear and loathing of housework" experienced by women who worked outside of the home and who were attracted to a consumerist lifestyle.

== Political usage ==
The English conservative philosopher Roger Scruton first wrote of oikophobia while at Boston University in 1993. In his 2004 book England and the Need for Nations, Scruton expanded usage of the word to mean "the repudiation of inheritance and home". He argues that it is "a stage through which the adolescent mind normally passes", but is also a feature of some, typically leftist, political impulses and ideologies which espouse xenophilia, i.e. preference for foreign cultures.

Scruton uses it as the antithesis of xenophobia. In his book Roger Scruton: Philosopher on Dover Beach the Irish journalist Mark Dooley describes oikophobia as centred within the academic establishment of the Western world as part of "both the common culture of the West, and the old educational curriculum that sought to transmit its humane values." This disposition has grown out of, for example, the writings of Jacques Derrida and of Michel Foucault's "assault on 'bourgeois' society result[ing] in an 'anti-culture' that took direct aim at holy and sacred things, condemning and repudiating them as oppressive and power-ridden." He continues:

Derrida is a classic oikophobe in so far as he repudiates the longing for home that the Western theological, legal, and literary traditions satisfy ... Derrida's deconstruction seeks to block the path to this 'core experience' of membership, preferring instead a rootless existence founded 'upon nothing.'

An extreme aversion to the sacred, and the thwarting of the connection of the sacred to the culture of the West is described as the underlying motif of oikophobia; and not the substitution of Christianity by another coherent system of belief. The paradox of the oikophobe seems to be that any opposition directed at the theological and cultural tradition of the West is to be encouraged even if it is "significantly more parochial, exclusivist, patriarchal, or ethnocentric." Scruton describes "a chronic form of oikophobia [which] has spread through the American universities, in the guise of political correctness."

Scruton's usage has been taken up by some American political commentators to refer to what they see as a rejection of traditional American culture by the liberal elite. In August 2010 James Taranto wrote a column in the Wall Street Journal entitled "Oikophobia: Why the liberal elite finds Americans revolting", in which he criticises supporters of the proposed Islamic center in New York as oikophobes who were defending Muslims and aimed to "exploit the 9/11 atrocity."

In the Netherlands oikophobia has been adopted by the politician and writer Thierry Baudet, which he describes in his book Oikophobia: The Fear of Home.

== Southey's usage ==
In his Letters from England (1808), Robert Southey describes oikophobia as a product of "a certain state of civilisation or luxury", referring to the habit among wealthy people to visit spa towns and seaside resorts in the summer months. He also mentions the fashion for picturesque travel to wild landscapes, such as the Scottish Highlands.

Southey's link of oikophobia to wealth and the search for new experiences was taken up by other writers, and cited in dictionaries. A writer in 1829 published an essay about his experience witnessing the aftermath of the Battle of Waterloo, saying:

[T]he love of locomotion is so natural to an Englishman, that nothing can chain him home, but the absolute impossibility of living abroad. No such imperious necessity acting upon me, I gave way to my oiko-phobia, and the summer of 1815 found me in Brussels.

In 1959 the Anglo-Egyptian author Bothaina Abd el-Hamid Mohamed used Southey's concept in his book Oikophobia: or, A literary craze for education through travel.

== See also ==
- Allophilia
- Clientitis
- Cultural cringe
- Endophobia
- Exoticism
- Internalized oppression
- Outgroup favoritism
- Reverse discrimination
- Self-hatred
- Tankie
- Wanderlust
- Xenocentrism
- Xenophilia
- Xenophobia
