= Malinchism =

Pejorative term for one's attraction to another culture at the expense of one's own

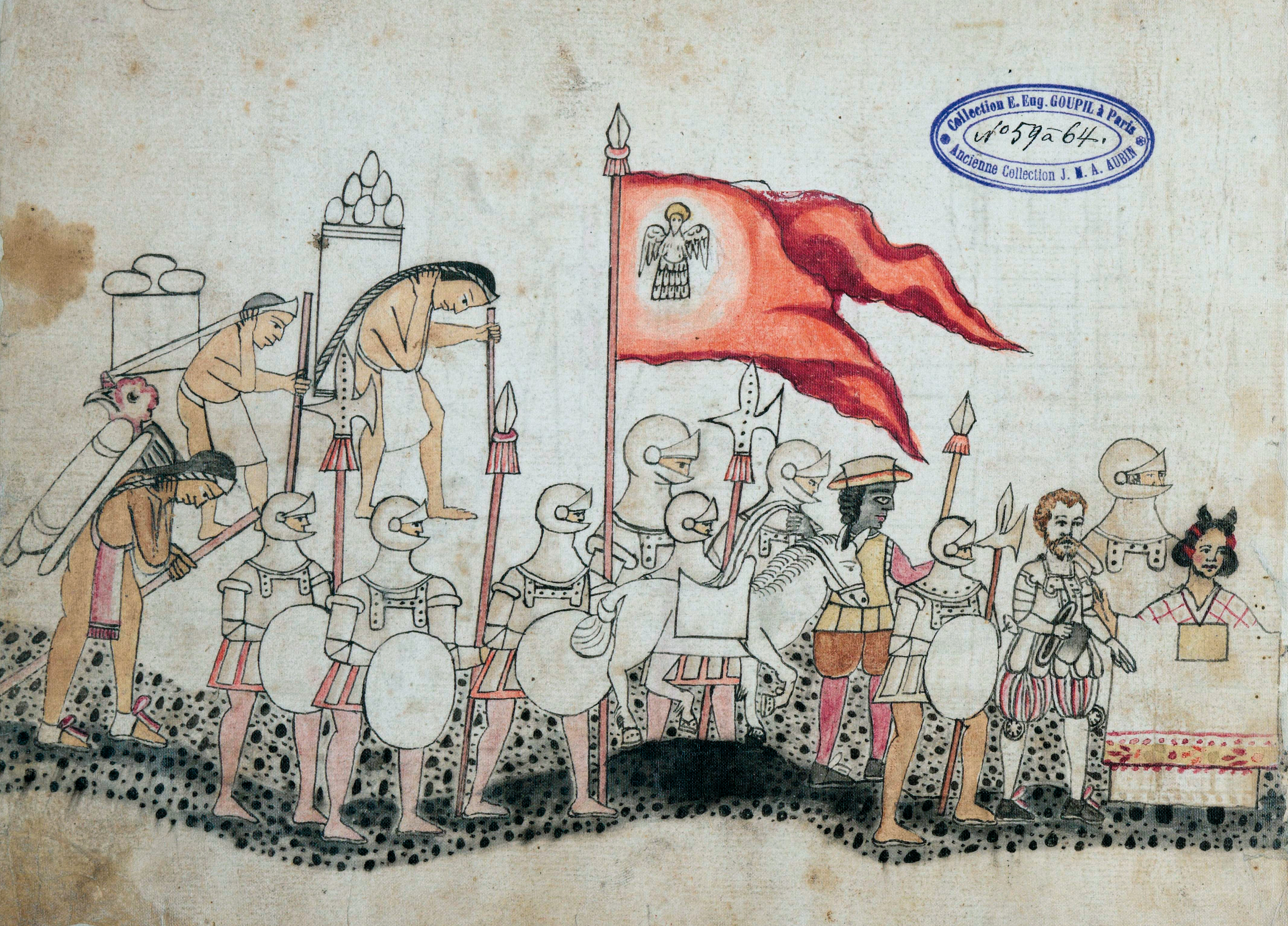
Codex Azcatitlan, Hernán Cortés and Malinche (far right), early 16th-century indigenous pictorial manuscript of the conquest of Mexico

Malinchism (Spanish: malinchismo) is a Spanish term used primarily in Mexico to refer to excessive admiration for the people, culture, ideas, behaviors, and lifestyle of the United States, Europe and other foreign countries over those native to Mexico. It has been described as a form of attraction that a person from one culture develops for another culture, a particular case of cultural cringe. It has been described as an ethnic inferiority complex or national self-hatred.

== Origin ==
Malinchism is derived from the name of Hernán Cortés's Nahua advisor La Malinche, also known by her Christian name "Marina".

She is a symbol for those indigenous Americans who aided the Spaniards in the conquest of New Spain. "Malinchism" may be taken as a pejorative, as an expression of disdain for those who are attracted by foreign values, thinking them superior, of better quality and worthy of imitation. It has been described as a deep-rooted Mexican inferiority complex.

== Uses ==
In Mexico and in other countries the term "malinchism" or "malinchist" applies to all those who feel an attraction to foreign cultures and disregard for their own culture. It also applies to politics, as in El Salvador, where leftist political parties call their opponents "malinchist right-wing". The myth of Malinche came to be applied as a technical term for giving preference to Western cultures. The concept has a potential broader application to refer to a colonized country developing an admiration or affection for a colonizing country.

Malinchism is also associated with the depiction of women as symbols of betrayal and deceitful behavior. In Mexican popular culture, this theme often portrays Malinche as both the deceiver and the deceived. In theatrical productions, she is sometimes depicted as a victim of conquest, while in other portrayals, she is portrayed as the architect of her own fate. She is represented in art as a figure showing women's inborn deception and guilt — one who used her sexuality and betrayed her children. Even in dance, the dichotomy persists. In La Malinche, a ballet composed in 1949, by José Limón, Malinche is at first an unwilling victim, then assumes the proud deportment of an aristocrat, and in the end, weighted down by the finery she wears, she gives birth to a mixed-race child who rejects her. In literature, Malinche has been compared to Eve, the temptress who through deception, leads men astray.

== Studies ==
Ueltschy and Ryans argued that upper-class consumers in Mexico display malinchism in their preference for American imports, rather than local Mexican brands. As result, in the late 1990s, American products were popular in middle class markets and their advertisers generally concentrated their efforts on urban Mexico City and avoided working class and rural areas. Jiménez et al. developed a scale for measuring malinchismo that accounted for the favoring of foreign entertainment, foreign people, foreign food, and foreign products among adolescents.

== See also ==
- Colonial mentality
- Xenocentrism
- Mongrel complex
- Yanacona, a Mapuche term for disloyal people of their kind
- Bunmei-kaika
- Mankurt
- Uncle Tom
- Useful Jew
- West Brit
- Xenophilia
- Macaulayism
- Pinkerton syndrome
