= Colonial mentality =

Internalized attitude of ethnic or cultural inferiority

A colonial mentality is the internalized attitude of ethnic or cultural inferiority felt by people as a result of colonization, i.e.: being colonized by another group. It corresponds with the belief that the cultural values of the colonizer are inherently superior to one's own. Postcolonial scholars have used the term "colonial mentality" to discuss the transgenerational effects of colonialism present in former colonies following decolonization. It is commonly used as an operational concept for framing ideological domination in historical colonial experiences. In psychology, colonial mentality has been used to explain instances of collective depression, anxiety, and other widespread mental-health issues in populations that have experienced colonization. Politically, resentment of foreign conquering masters and nostalgic memories of former national glory can accompany ideas like that of the Norman yoke in England, of the Tatar-Mongol yoke in Russia, or of (say) Italian or Indonesian irredentism.

Notable Marxist influences on the postcolonial concept of colonial mentality include Frantz Fanon's works on the fracturing of the colonial psyche through Western cultural domination, the concept of cultural hegemony developed by Italian Communist Party luminary Antonio Gramsci and the term "gharbzadegi" (Westoxification) coined by Iranian secular intellectual Jalal al-e Ahmad to describe the fascination with and dependence upon the West to the detriment of traditional, historical, and cultural ties to Islam and the Islamic world.

== Influences from Marxism ==
=== Frantz Fanon ===
Frantz Fanon's Marxist writings on imperialism, racism, and decolonizing struggles have influenced post-colonial discussions about the internalization of colonial prejudice. Fanon first tackled the problem of, what he called, the "colonial alienation of the person" as a mental health issue through psychiatric analysis.

In The Wretched of the Earth (French: Les Damnés de la Terre), published in 1961, Fanon used psychiatry to analyze how French colonization and the carnage of the Algerian War had mentally affected Algerians' self-identity and mental health. The book argues that during the period of colonization there was a subtle and constant mental pathology that developed within the colonial psyche. Fanon argued that the colonial psyche is fractured by the lack of mental and material homogeneity as a result of the colonial power's Western culture being pressured onto the colonized population despite the existing material differences between them.

Here Fanon expands traditional Marxist understandings of historical materialism to explore how the dissonance between material existence and culture functions to transform the colonized people through the mold of the Western bourgeoisie. This meant that the native Algerian came to view their own traditional culture and identity through the lens of colonial prejudice. Fanon observed that average Algerians internalized and then openly repeated remarks that were in line with the institutionalized racist culture of the French colonizers; dismissing their own culture as backward due to the internalization of Western colonial ideologies.

According to Fanon this results in a destabilizing existential conflict within the colonized culture:

In the West, the family circle, the effects of education, and the relatively high standard of living of the working class provide a more or less efficient protection against the harmful action of these pastimes. But in an African country, where mental development is uneven, where the violent collision of two worlds has considerably shaken old traditions and thrown the universe of the perceptions out of focus, the impressionability and sensibility of the Young African are at the mercy of the various assaults made upon them by the very Nature of Western Culture.

== Colonial India ==
Territorial extent of British India

During the period of European colonial rule in India, Europeans in India typically regarded many aspects of Indian culture with disdain and supported colonial rule as a beneficial "civilizing mission". Colonial rule in India was framed as an act which was beneficial to the people of India, rather than a process of political and economic dominance by a small minority of foreigners.

Under colonial rule, many practices were outlawed, such as the practice of forcing widows to immolate themselves (known as sati) with acts being deemed idolatrous being discouraged by Evangelical missionaries, the latter of which has been claimed by some scholars to have played a large role in the developments of the modern definition of Hinduism. These claims base their assumptions on the lack of a unified Hindu identity prior to the period of colonial rule, and modern Hinduism's unprecedented outward focus on a monotheistic Vedanta worldview. These developments have been read as the result of colonial views which discouraged aspects of Indian religions which differed significantly from Christianity. It has been noted that the prominence of the Bhagavad Gita as a primary religious text in Hindu discourse was a historical response to European criticisms of Indian culture. Europeans found that the Gita had more in common with their own Christian Bible, leading to the denouncement of Hindu practices more distantly related to monotheistic world views; with some historians claiming that Indians began to characterize their faith as the equivalent of Christianity in belief (especially in terms of monotheism) and structure (in terms of providing an equivalent primary sacred text). Hindu nationalism developed in the 19th century as an opposition to European ideological prominence; however, local Indian elites often aimed to make themselves and Indian society modern by "emulating the West". This led to the emergence of what some have termed 'neo-Hinduism': consisting of reformist rhetoric transforming Hindu tradition from above, disguised as a revivalist call to return to the traditional practises of the faith. Reflecting the same arguments made by Christian missionaries, who argued that the more superstitious elements of Hindu practice were responsible for corrupting the potential rational philosophy of the faith (i.e. the more Christian-like sentiments). Moving the definitions of Hindu practice away from more overt idol worshiping, reemphasizing the concept of Brahman as a monotheistic divinity, and focusing more on the figure of Krishna in Vaishnavism due to his role as a messianic type figure (more inline with European beliefs) which makes him a suitable alternative to the Christian figure of Jesus Christ.

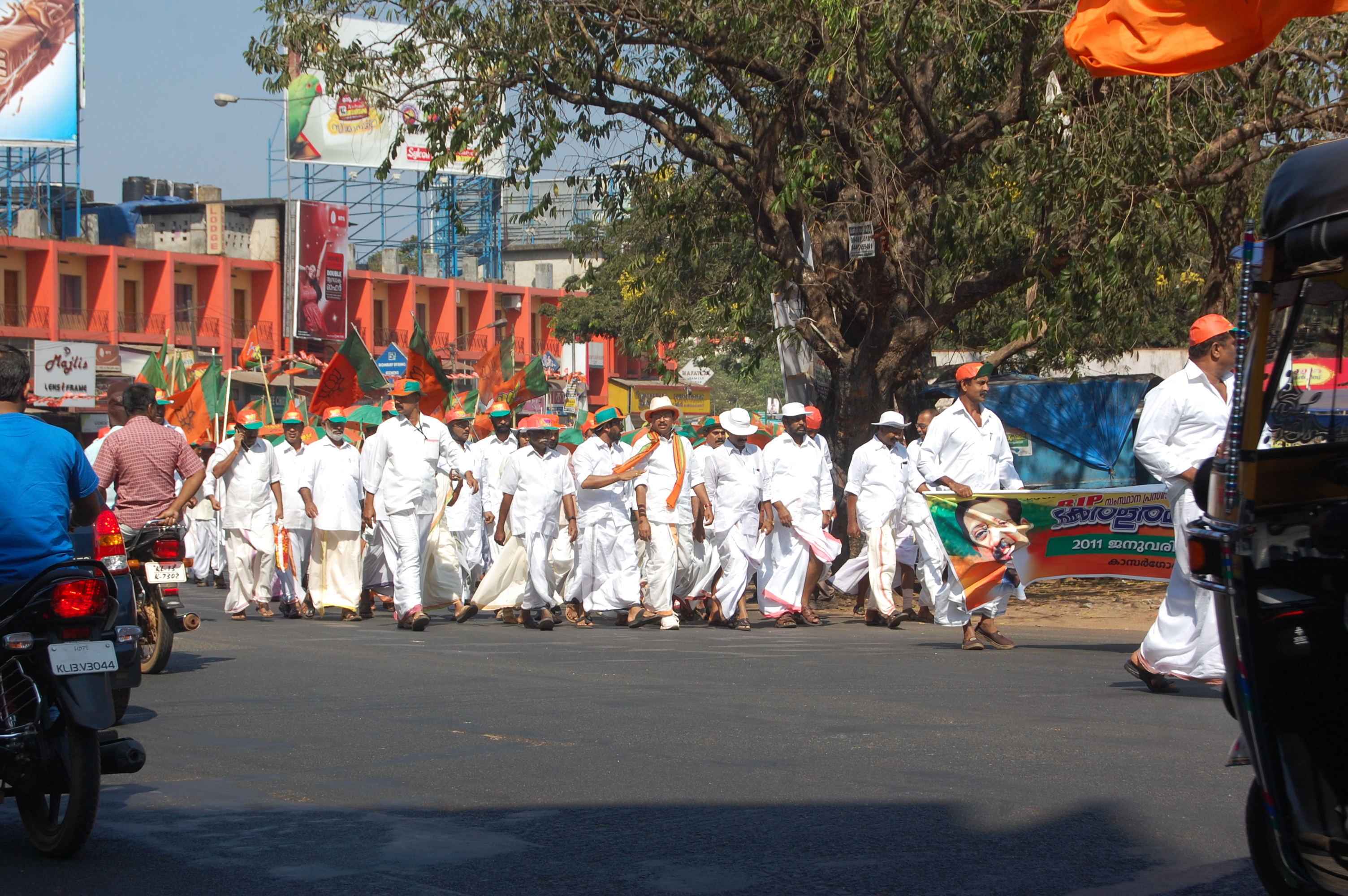
BJP supporters walking about in Kerala

The Bharatiya Janata Party (BJP), India's current ruling party, follows this tradition of nationalistic Hinduism (Hindutva), and promotes an Indian national identity infused with neo-Vedantic which has been claimed by some to have been influenced by a "colonial mentality".

Some critics have claimed that writer Rudyard Kipling's portrayals of Indian characters in his works supported the view that colonized people were incapable of living without the help of Europeans, describing these portrayals as racist. In his famous poem "The White Man's Burden", Kipling directly argues for this point by romanticizing the "civilising mission" in non-Western countries. Jaway Syed has claimed that Kipling's poems idolizes Western culture as entirely rational and civilized, while treating non-white cultures as 'childlike' and 'demonic'. Similar sentiments have been interpreted in Kipling's other works, such as his characterization of the Second Boer War as a "white man's war"; along with his presentation of 'whiteness' as a morally and culturally superior trait of the West. His portrayal of Indians in his Jungle Book stories have also been criticized by Jane Hotchkiss as examples of the chauvinistic infantilization of colonized peoples in popular culture. Some historians claim that Kipling's works have contributed towards the development of a colonial mentality in the ways that the colonized people in these fictional narratives are made submissive to and dependent on their white rulers.

== Spanish Empire ==
=== Hispanic America ===
In the overseas territories administered by the Spanish Empire, racial mixing between Spanish settlers and the indigenous peoples resulted in a union later called Mestizo. There were limitations in the racial classes only to people from African descent, this mainly for being descendants of slaves under a current state of slavery. Unlike Mestizos, castizos or indigenous people who were protected by the Leyes de las Indias "to be treated like equals, as citizens of the Spanish Empire". It was completely forbidden to enslave the indígenas under the death penalty charge.

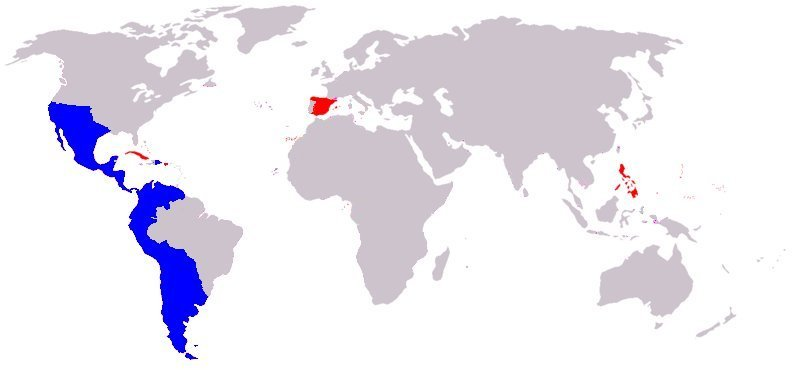
Spanish Empire, 1824

Mestizos and other mixed raced combinations were categorized into different castas by viceroyalty administrators. This system was applied to Spanish territories in the Americas and the Philippines, where large populations of mixed raced individuals made up the increasing majority of the viceroyalty population (until the present day).

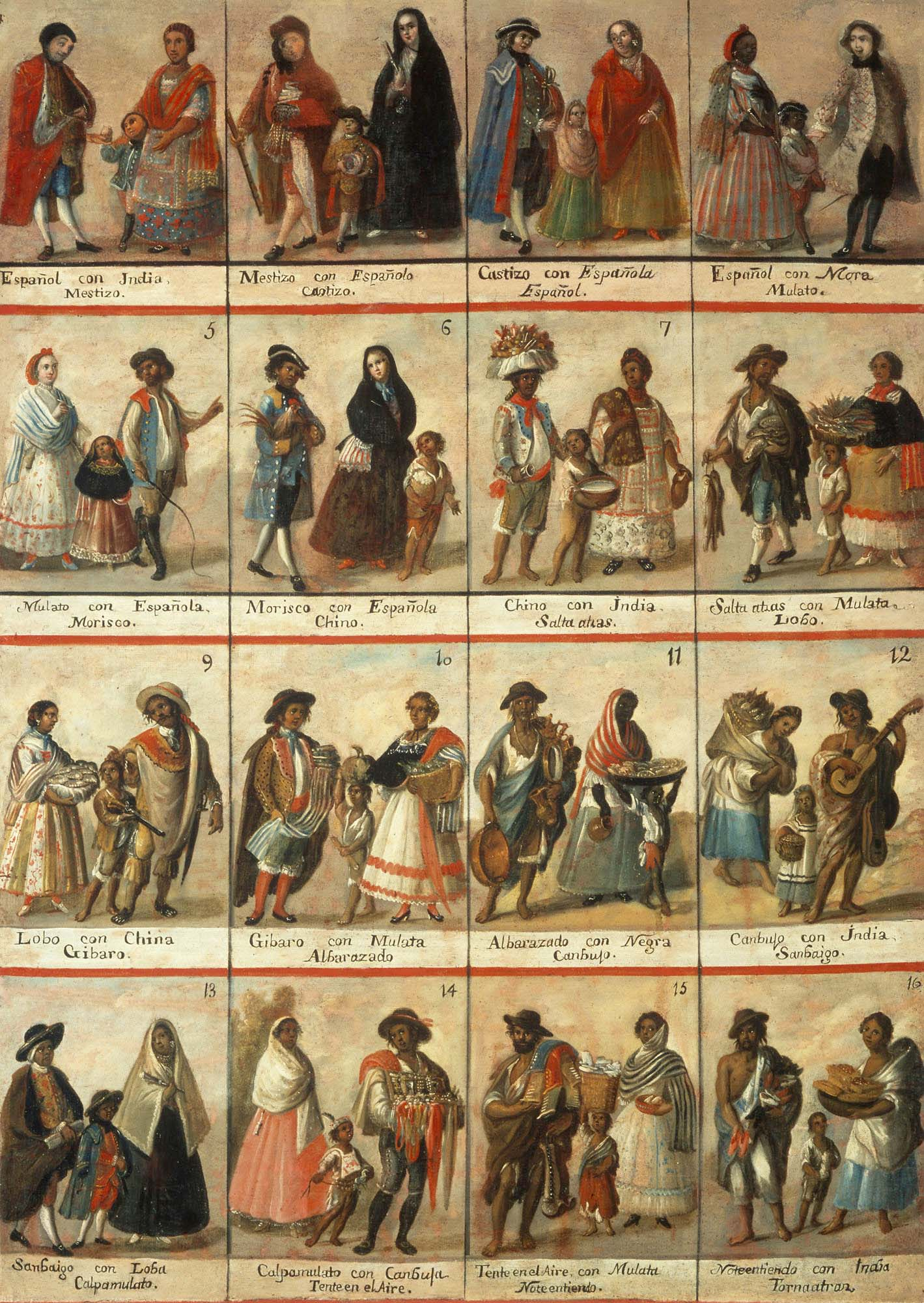
Casta painting showing couples of different races arranged hierarchically, and the resulting racial status of their children

These racial categories punished those with Black African or Afro-Latin heritage; those of European descent were given privilege over these other mixtures. As a result of this system, people of African descent struggled to downplay their indigenous heritage and cultural trappings, in order to appear superficially more Spanish or natives. With these internalized prejudices individuals' choices of clothes, occupations, and forms of religious expression. Those of mixed racial identities who wanted to receive the institutional benefits of being Spanish (such as higher educational institutions and career opportunities), could do so by suppressing their own cultures and acting with "Spanishness". This mentality lead to commonplace racial forgery in Latin America, often accompanied by legitimizing oral accounts of a Spanish ancestor and a Spanish surname. Most mixed-white and white people in Latin America have Spanish surnames inherited from Spanish ancestors, while most other Latin Americans who have Spanish names and surnames acquired them through the Christianization and Hispanicization of the indigenous and African slave populations by Spanish friars.

However, most initial attempts at this were only partially successful, as Amerindian groups simply blended Catholicism with their traditional beliefs. Syncretism between native beliefs and Christianity is still largely prevalent in Indian and Mestizo communities in Hispanic America.

=== Philippines ===
Prior to the arrival by the Spaniards (1565–1898), the Sulu Archipelago (located in southern Philippines) was a colony of the Majapahit Empire (1293–1527) based in Indonesia. The Americans were the last country to colonize the Philippines (1898–1946) and nationalists claim that it continues to act as a neo-colony of the US despite its formal independence in 1946. In the Philippines colonial mentality is most evident in the preference for Filipino mestizos (primarily those of mixed native Filipino and white ancestry, but also mixed indigenous Filipinos and Chinese, and other ethnic groups) in the entertainment industry and mass media, in which they have received extensive exposure despite constituting a small fraction of the population.

The Cádiz Constitution of 1812 automatically gave Spanish citizenship to all Filipinos regardless of race. The census of 1870 stated that at least one-third of the population of Luzon had partial Hispanic ancestry (from varying points of origin and ranging from Latin America to Spain).

The combined number of all types of white mestizos or Eurasians is 3.6%, according to a genetic study by Stanford University. This is contradicted by another genetic study done by the University of California which stated that Filipinos possess moderate amounts of European admixture.

A cultural preference for relatively light skinned people exists within the Philippines. According to Kevin Nadal and David Okazaki, light skin preference may have pre-colonial origins. However, they also suggest that this preference was strengthened by colonialism. In an undated Philippine epic, the hero covers his face with a shield so that the sun would not "lessen his handsome looks". Some regard this as proof that desire for light-colored skin predates overseas influences. Regardless of the origin of the preference, the use of skin bleaching remains prevalent among Filipino men and women, however there is also a growing embrace of darker skinned female aesthetic within the Philippines.

== See also ==
- Acculturation
  - Category: History of colonialism
- Cabang Atas
  - Kapitan Cina
  - Kapitan Arab
  - Kapitan Keling
- Cognitive dissonance
- Colonialism
- Colorism
- Creolization
- Cultural assimilation
- Cultural cringe
- Cultural identity
- Cultural imperialism
- Decreolization
- Enculturation
- Endophobia
- Eurocentrism
- Globalization
- Hamitic theory
- Hellenization
  - History of colonialism
- Impact of Western European colonialism and colonisation
- Indigenization/Indigenism
- Intercultural competence
- Language shift
- Macaulay's minutes
- Mongrel complex
- Oikophobia
- Paper Bag Party
- Passing (racial identity)
- Race
- Racialism
- Romanization (cultural)
- Self-fulfilling prophecy
- Social interpretations of race
- Syncretism
- Westernization
- "The White Man's Burden"
