= Canadaphile =

Person who admires Canada, its people, culture, and languages

A Canadaphile is a non-Canadian admirer of Canada and its culture, symbolised by the maple-leaf flag.

A Canadaphile (also Canadophile, Canadiophile, Canadaphilic or Canadaphiliac) is a person, typically not Canadian, who admires Canada, its people, culture, and languages (mainly English and French).

== Etymology ==
The word combines the name of the country Canada with the suffix -phile, from the Ancient Greek adjective φίλος (phílos), meaning "loving" or "dear". It follows the same nineteenth- and twentieth-century pattern of nationality-based coinages as Francophile, Anglophile, and Russophile, which describe enthusiasts of a particular country or culture. The antonym is Canadophobe, denoting hostility toward Canada.

== Usage ==
The term has appeared in journalism and literary criticism since at least the late twentieth century, generally to describe non-Canadians with a marked interest in the country. A reviewer for Publishers Weekly characterised the American journalist Lansing Lamont as an "American Canadaphile" in describing his 1994 study of Canadian national unity, Breakup: The Coming End of Canada and the Stakes for America. Newspaper columnists have likewise used the label self-referentially, as in a 2008 column titled "Confessions of a Canadophile".

In academic and literary contexts, the adjective Canadophile has been applied to communities of foreign readers and scholars engaged with Canadian literature; the literary scholar Reingard M. Nischik, for instance, notes the strong interest in Canadian short fiction among "Canadophile" German-speaking countries.

== See also ==
- Anglophile
- Anti-Canadian sentiment
- Canadian nationalism
- Culture of Canada
- Foreign relations of Canada
- Francophile
- Xenophilia
