= Siege mentality =

Shared feeling of victimization and defensiveness experienced by a group of people

In sociology, siege mentality is a shared feeling of victimization and defensiveness—a term derived from the actual experience of military defences of real sieges. It is a collective state of mind in which a group of people believe themselves constantly attacked, oppressed, or isolated in the face of the negative intentions of the rest of the world. Although a group phenomenon, the term describes both the emotions and thoughts of the group as a whole, and as individuals. The result is a state of being overly fearful of surrounding peoples, and an intractably defensive attitude.

The related term bunker mentality may be used in the context of businesses facing competition or downsizing, with a similar paradigm applying to some religious groups.

== Characteristics ==
Among the consequences of a siege mentality are black and white thinking, social conformity, and lack of trust, but also a preparedness for the worst and a strong sense of social cohesion.

== Examples ==
Historically, siege mentalities existed in the Soviet Union, Communist People's Socialist Republic of Albania, Rhodesia, Apartheid South Africa, Northern Ireland during The Troubles, and Tudor England as a result of ideological or political isolation.

In the present day, siege mentalities have also been described with regards to countries such as Israel and North Korea; in the latter it is arguably encouraged by the government to help justify their continuance in power. Further contemporary examples of states in which a siege mentality is prevalent may include Russia under Vladimir Putin, Turkish Republic of Northern Cyprus (see Cyprus conflict), Republic of China (see due to its facing an existential threat from the Communist mainland), Venezuela under the Bolivarian leaders Chavez & Maduro and (to a lesser extent), Iran (see 1979 Islamic revolution), Cuba since Communist rule (see Cuban Revolution) and India under the Narendra Modi led BJP government (see Hindutva).

Within the United States, the siege mentality has been used to describe conservative Southerners following the American Civil War, and later on the Southern Strategy and supporters of Donald Trump, especially towards the federal government. The politics of U.S. Evangelicals in particular were cited by The New York Times in 2017 as reflecting a siege mentality. Some police departments have also been noted to adopt a siege mentality, with officers viewing themselves as under attack by their own communities.

Sociologically, the term may refer to persecution feelings by anyone in a group that views itself as a threatened minority, as with the early psychoanalysts. This can be used for example in the field of sports, where coaches or managers often create a siege mentality in their players by highlighting an environment of hostility from outside the club (whether the hostility is real or exaggerated is irrelevant).

Siege mentalities are particularly common in business, the result of competition or downsizing, though here the (smaller-scale) alternative of "bunker mentality" (analogous to soldiers who have taken shelter in a bunker) may be used. Some religious groups may have this paradigm, particularly if they are not traditional mainstream groups.

== Literary analogies ==
Seamus Heaney used the phrase "Besieged within the siege" to describe the feeling of the beleaguered Catholic minority in Northern Ireland within the broader siege mentality of the Protestant community itself.

== See also ==
- Amity-enmity complex
- Autarky
- Fear of crime
- Garrison mentality
- Grandiosity
- Groupthink
- Hardline
- Hostile media effect
- Isolationism
- Mass mobilization
- Nativism (politics)
- Social identity theory
- Splitting (psychology)
- State collapse
- Survivalism
- Victim mentality
- Xenophobia

Related psychological behaviours:

- Defence mechanisms: can arise when one feels the need to defend oneself while being under siege.
- Persecution complex: may develop because one feels victimized or the need to defend against an outgroup.
