= Cultural cringe =

Feeling of inferiority of one's culture to another

In the fields of cultural studies and social anthropology, cultural cringe (also known as inverse nationalism, ethnomasochism and oikophobia) is an expression used to refer to an internalized inferiority complex where people dismiss their own culture as inferior (cringe-inducing) when compared to the cultures of other countries. In anthropology, cultural cringe is related to the concept of the colonial mentality (belief of inferiority), and usually is manifested in the anti-intellectualism deployed against intellectuals, scientists, and artists native to a colonized country or a former colony. Moreover, at the personal level, cultural cringe also is manifested as cultural alienation.

== Origin ==
In 1894, Australian bush poet Henry Lawson wrote in his preface to his Short Stories in Prose and Verse:

The Australian writer, until he gets a "London hearing," is only accepted as an imitator of some recognized English or American author; and, as soon as he shows signs of coming to the front, he is labelled "The Australian Southey," "The Australian Burns," or "The Australian Bret Harte," and lately, "The Australian Kipling." Thus no matter how original he may be, he is branded, at the very start, as a plagiarist, and by his own country, which thinks, no doubt, that it is paying him a compliment and encouraging him, while it is really doing him a cruel and an almost irreparable injury. But mark! As soon as the Southern writer goes "home" and gets some recognition in England, he is "So-and-So, the well-known Australian author whose work has attracted so much attention in London lately"; and we first hear of him by cable, even though he might have been writing at his best for ten years in Australia.

The term "cultural cringe" was coined in Australia after the Second World War by the Melbourne critic and social commentator A. A. Phillips, and defined in an influential and highly controversial 1950 essay of the same name published in the Summer 1950 edition of literary journal Meanjin. It explored ingrained feelings of inferiority that local intellectuals struggled against, and which were most clearly pronounced in the Australian theatre, music, art and letters. The implications of these insights potentially applied to all former colonial nations, and the essay is now recognised as a cornerstone in the development of post-colonial theory in Australia. In essence, Phillips pointed out that the public widely assumed that anything produced by local dramatists, actors, musicians, artists and writers was necessarily deficient when compared to the works of their European and American counterparts. In the words of the poet Chris Wallace-Crabbe (quoted by Peter Conrad), Australia was being made to rhyme with failure. The only ways local arts professionals could build themselves up in public esteem was either to follow overseas fashions, or, more often, to spend a period of time working in Britain.

As Lawson continued in his 1894 preface: "The same paltry spirit tried to dispose of the greatest of modern short-story writers as 'The Californian Dickens', but America wasn't built that way – neither was Bret Harte!" The cultural cringe of Australians and the cultural swagger of Americans reflects deep contrasts between the American and the Australian experiences of extricating themselves from English apron-strings. Dealing specifically with Australia, Phillips pointed out that sport has been the only field in which ordinary people accepted that their nation was able to perform and excel internationally. Indeed, while they prided themselves on the qualities of locally produced athletes and sportsmen, whom they invariably considered first-rate, Australians behaved as if in more intellectual pursuits the nation generated only second-rate talent. Some commentators believe that cultural cringe contributes to the perceived anti-intellectualism that has underpinned public life in Australia.

== By country ==
=== Australia ===
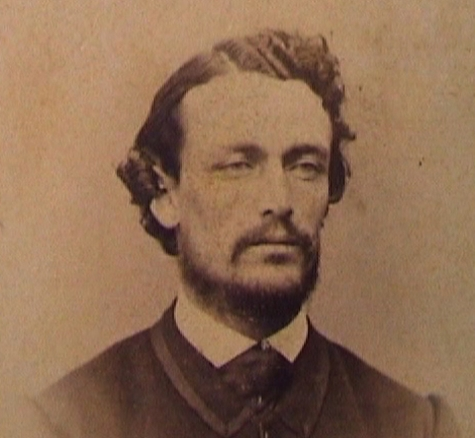
It has been posited that Australia's "distinct ambivalence" towards its own history, coupled with a desire to rid the country of its "convict stain", resulted in historical figures such as star cricketer and Australian rules football founder Tom Wills being virtually forgotten.

The term cultural cringe is most commonly used in Australia, where it is believed by some to be a widely accepted facet of Australian culture. In Another Look at the Cultural Cringe, the Australian academic Leonard John Hume examined the idea of cultural cringe as an oversimplification of the complexities of Australian history and culture. His controversial essay argues that "The cultural cringe ... did not exist, but it was needed, and so it was invented." A manifestation of Australian cultural cringe can be expressed in the almost-obsessive curiosity of Australians in wanting to know what foreigners think of Australia and its culture.

Some commentators claim the cultural cringe particularly affects local television programming in Australia, which is heavily influenced by imported shows, mainly of American and British origin. The Federal government has legislated to keep a quota of Australian content.

Some argue that a form of cultural cringe resulted in anti-heritage attitudes which led to the demolition of many world-class pre-war buildings in Sydney, Melbourne and Adelaide (Australia's three largest cities at the time), destroying some of the world's best examples of Victorian architecture. Modernism was promoted to many Australians as casting off imperial Europe to rebuild a new independent identity, and the existing pre-war architecture, which was a feature of Australian cities, was denigrated. This resulted in many calls to demolish the Royal Exhibition Building, labelled the derogatory term "white elephant". It was not until Queen Elizabeth II granted the building Royal status that Australians began to recognise its value. The building became the first in Australia to be given World Heritage status. This reaction against the cultural cringe continues in some fields such as architecture, where local architects are shunned for using introduced styles.

It has also been claimed that cultural cringe has led to federal government information technology contracts going to large foreign multinationals, rather than domestic IT companies.

Convict stain is another manifestation of cultural cringe. For several generations following the cessation of penal transportation, many Australians felt a sense of shame about being descended from convicts, and many did not even attempt to investigate their families' origins for fear of finding convicts in their lineage. In recent decades community attitudes have changed, and many Australians with convict ancestors are now more comfortable investigating and discussing their past, wearing their forebears' status almost as a badge of pride. Colloquially, attempts by non-Australians to negatively connote convict pasts are laughed off by Australians, who are now more inclined to associate criminal forebears as evidence for the possession of more positively perceived Australian attributes such as anti-authoritarianism.

=== Brazil ===
In Brazil, the phrase complexo de vira-lata (the "mongrel complex") denotes the same as cultural cringe. It has been attributed to playwright and journalist Nelson Rodrigues in the 1950s. The term is often evoked to criticize some attitude by any Brazilian toward a foreign culture or politics deemed as submissive and self-dismissive.

=== Canada ===
Many cultural commentators in Canada have suggested that a similar process also operates in that country. Nearly all Canadian cultural industries, including music, film, television, literature, visual art and theatre, have had to struggle to some extent against a perception among Canadian audiences that Canadian works in those fields were less important or worthy than American or British works. The specific phrase "cultural cringe" is not widely used to label the phenomenon in Canada, although it has been used in isolated instances; more typically, Canadian cultural commentators speak of a "Canadian inferiority complex" or label specific instances of the phenomenon with satirical terms such as "beaver hour".

Prior to the 1970s, Canadian radio stations gave almost no airtime to Canadian music, and apart from CBC Television, Canadian television stations spent very little money on Canadian-produced programming; in response the Canadian Radio-television and Telecommunications Commission (CRTC) developed Canadian content requirements for radio and broadcasters.

=== Dominican Republic ===
In the Dominican Republic, the term Guacanagarix complex (Spanish: complejo de Guacanagarix) is used of Dominicans who express negative attitudes towards their homeland after travelling overseas. The term originates from Guacanagaríx, a cazique (tribal chieftain) of the Taíno people who was regarded as overly welcoming towards Christopher Columbus and European explorers.

=== New Zealand ===
New Zealanders are said to suffer from a cultural cringe, which has been wearing off in recent years. The New Zealand English accent is said to have been influenced by a cultural cringe since the 1900s but it too is lessening in recent years. It appears that the attitude has lessened markedly in the 2000s following the success of the award-winning The Lord of the Rings movie trilogy which showcased much New Zealand scenery and film-making talent and boosted international awareness of New Zealand. The TV show Flight of the Conchords, which screened on HBO in the United States from 2007 to 2009, furthered American and international awareness of New Zealand (while ironically using cultural cringe as a frequent plot device), as have motion pictures such as The World's Fastest Indian.

=== Scotland ===
Scottish First Minister Jack McConnell claimed a "Scottish cringe" in relation to Scotland's disdain for free enterprise.

== Connection with cultural alienation ==
Cultural cringe is tightly connected with cultural alienation, the process of devaluing or abandoning one's own culture or cultural background. A person who is culturally alienated places little value on their own or host culture, and instead hungers for that of a—sometimes imposed—colonising nation. The post-colonial theorists Bill Ashcroft, Gareth Griffiths and Helen Tiffin link alienation with a sense of dislocation or displacement some peoples (especially those from immigrant cultures) will feel when they look to a distant nation for their values. Culturally alienated societies often exhibit a weak sense of cultural self-identity and place little worth on themselves. It has been argued that the most common manifestation of this alienation among peoples from post-colonial nations at present is an appetite for all things American, from television and music, to clothing, slang, even names. However, the popularity of American culture across both formerly colonized and colonizer countries possibly negate this argument. Culturally alienated individuals will also exhibit little knowledge or interest in the history of their host society, placing no real value on such matters.

The issue of cultural alienation has led the Australian sociologists Brian Head and James Walter to interpret the cultural cringe as the belief that one's own country occupies a "subordinate cultural place on the periphery" and that "intellectual standards are set and innovations occur elsewhere." As a consequence, a person who holds this belief is inclined to devalue their own country's cultural, academic and artistic life, and to venerate the "superior" culture of another (colonising) country.

A more sophisticated approach to the issues raised by the cultural cringe, as felt by artistic practitioners in former colonies around the world, was developed and advanced by the Australian art historian Terry Smith in his essay "The Provincialism Problem".

== See also ==
- Allophilia
- Criticism of nationalism
- Endophobia
- Exoticism
- Internalized oppression
- Internalized racism
- Malinchism
- Oikophobia
- Orientalism
- Racial fetishism
- Romantic racism
- Self-hating Jew
- Shoneenism
- Xenocentrism
