= Outgroup favoritism =

Explanation for a set of social behaviors

Outgroup favoritism is a social psychological construct intended to capture why some socially disadvantaged groups will express favorable attitudes (and even preferences) toward social, cultural, or ethnic groups other than their own. Considered by many psychologists as part of a variety of system-justifying motives, outgroup favoritism has been widely researched as a potential explanation for why groups—particularly those disadvantaged by the normative social hierarchy—are motivated to support, maintain, and preserve the status quo. Specifically, outgroup favoritism provides a contrast to the idea of ingroup favoritism, which proposes that individuals exhibit a preference for members of their own group over members of the outgroup.

== Outgroup favoritism and system justification ==
In a 1994 review of the existing literature on the ideas people employ to legitimize and support ideas, structures, and behaviors, psychologists John T. Jost and Mahzarin Banaji observed that the existing theories of ego-justification (i.e., the utilization of stereotypes as a means to protect the self) and group justification (i.e., the utilization of stereotypes to protect the status of a given social group) could not adequately explain why members of a given ingroup would express negative stereotypes about themselves, often times leveraging these in contexts that disadvantaged their own group.

It was out of the attempt to explain the phenomena of outgroup favoritism that led to the development of what would later become system justification theory. According to Jost and Banaji, system justification theory is constructed around the notion that people have three basic needs: 1) a need for certainty and meaning, 2) a need for safety and security, and 3) a need for a shared reality (i.e., epistemic, existential, and relational needs). Taking inspiration from the body of work already examining how people justify their experiences to themselves on the individual and group levels, Jost and Banaji additionally proposed that people meet these three needs on a systemic level.

Contrary to the long-standing idea that strong identification with the group on an individual level will generate the opposite (i.e., individuals are motivated to preserve a positive image of their own group), system justification theory is founded upon the idea that people meet their epistemic, existential, and relational needs on a systemic level, sometimes above and beyond the individual and group-levels. Conceptualized within a system justification theory framework, outgroup favoritism is best understood as an expression of how people are motivated to defend/preserve the status quo of a given system even when the normative ideologies and practices run counter to their own interests.

== Proof of concept ==
In the 2000-2020s research on this phenomenon tends to fall into three dominant streams. The first of these examines assessments of outgroup favoritism on the group attitude level. Work in this area commonly involves asking members of socially disadvantaged groups the extent to which they would support policies or structures that favor socially advantaged groups. Scholars have examined group-level expressions of out-group favoritism along dimensions ranging from political ideology to economic status to gender. For example, in one of the classic (albeit, somewhat debated) studies, Mark Hoffarth and John Jost analyzed two different samples of sexual minority participants to examine the relationship between implicit stereotypic attitudes about sexual minorities, political orientation, and support for same-sex marriage.

Across two samples, researchers found a three-way interaction across the implicit association of sexual minorities with negative stereotypes, conservative political ideology, and support of same-sex marriage. Specifically, they found support for their original hypotheses that political conservatism is strongly associated with the endorsement of negative stereotypes on the implicit level and opposition to same-sex marriage, even amongst sexual minority groups. While the exact interpretation of these findings is still a topic of debate within the system justification literature, this study is one of the most widely cited within the academic community for demonstrating that even groups disadvantaged by the (in this case, legal) structures of the existing status quo will express and employ negative stereotypes about their own group and oppose policies that appear to contradict their own interests.

== Proposed mechanisms and correlates ==
The second predominant stream within the literature investigates the potential mechanisms and correlated constructs that might fuel the behaviors characteristic of outgroup-favoritism-based motivations. In this area, scholars have struggled to isolate the mechanisms behind outgroup favoritism specifically from those of system-justifying motives more broadly. Consequently, much of the literature in this area tends to focus on how outgroup favoritism interacts with other components of system justification theory such as negative self-stereotyping, depressed entitlement, and the role of individual beliefs.

=== Implicit associations ===
According to the American Psychological Association's dictionary, implicit association captures the subconscious attitudinal associations people express toward various object/evaluative pairings. The most common method of capturing these underlying attitudes is via the implicit association test, a task in which participants are asked to sort members of specific categories (e.g., race) into specific evaluative categories (e.g., good/bad). One common method for capturing outgroup favoritism is via the implicit association test, the idea being that minority group members exist within a societal context that repeatedly reinforces their minority (and commonly, inferior) status. Scholars argue that this repeated exposure embeds rationalizing social inequality on an automatic level such that outgroup preference expresses itself most saliently using implicit measures.

For an example of how this operates, researchers recruited 110 African-American undergraduate students and asked them to categorize faces across two categories: Black/White and pleasant/unpleasant. After completing the IAT task, participants were presented with a task and told that their partner would either be Black or White. Participants were then asked to rate their partner in terms of performance expectations and likability. The authors found that for stereotypically "White" tasks, African Americans implicitly favored Whites, giving them higher performance evaluations and likability—the implication being that, in strongly racially-stereotyped contexts, individuals from minority groups will implicitly express outgroup favoritism.

=== Negative self-stereotyping ===
Negative self-stereotyping refers to the idea that members of various groups will express or endorse group stereotypes about fellow members of their own group that are unflattering and even outright harmful. While much of this work is concentrated on examining gender, scholars have demonstrated that negative self-stereotyping occurs across a variety of social identities including race and sexuality. For an example of how this works (and the proposed connections to outgroup favoritism): Burkley and Blanton conducted a 2008 study in which they asked men and women to complete a math test. All participants received failure feedback and were additionally asked to complete a stereotype endorsement measure with the order of these two components varying across conditions. The authors found that women were far more likely to embrace a negative stereotype about gendered math ability after receiving failure feedback, which they interpret as supporting the notion that individuals will palliatively leverage negative stereotypes against their own group. Extending this work, other scholars in this area have conducted studies on how women will negatively self-stereotype themselves as lacking a wide range of "masculine" traits or competencies after being exposed to information that threatens a gendered status quo.

Similar to Jost and Hoffarth's analyses of conservative sexual minority members, scholars are continuing to critique how negative self-stereotyping interacts with outgroup favoritism. Though many agree that the two share close links, there is an ongoing debate as to whether negative self-stereotyping is an expression of outgroup favoritism or whether it should be operationalized and studied as an independent, but related concepts. On the one hand, several authors argue that, because outgroup favoritism is operationalized as a motive instead of a behavior or attitude, negative self-stereotyping is a clear behavioral and attitudinal expression of an underlying outgroup preference motive that is itself the product of internalized inferiority (essentially, that the stereotyping behavior can't occur without a motive and the motive itself can't be measured independent of its behavioral correlate). Jost explicitly states that it is "not that people have a special motivation to favor the outgroup merely because it is an outgroup. Rather, outgroup favoritism is seen as one manifestation of the tendency to internalize and thus perpetuate the system of inequality." Furthermore, given that system justification theory is motivation-based, some scholars propose that behavioral and attitudinal constructs like negative self-stereotyping would not be appropriate to consider independently of their motives in a purely motive-based understanding of system justification.

On the other hand, those that consider negative self-stereotyping as a separate construct under the system justification umbrella note that negative self-stereotyping mediates similar outcomes to outgroup favoritism regardless of whether outgroup favoritism is considered as a variable. The amorphous nature of this debate is not helped by the research indicating that both negative self-stereotyping and outgroup favoritism engender similar beneficial and detrimental outcomes. For example, many scholars' findings support that both negative self-stereotyping and outgroup favoritism have similarly palliative effects by allowing individuals within unjust systems to rationalize the status quo as fair and valid (in line with system justification theory).

This work finds that both constructs provide the positive effect of buffering one's self-image against personal and social threats. In line with the "as sub-components" argument, research has demonstrated that the rationalization that occurs as a product from both negative self-stereotyping and outgroup favoritism allows individuals to justify existing inequality. Scholars have found that for both constructs, the perception that preservation of the status quo is the most important goal within a society has the detrimental side-effect of reducing the drive to challenge or change existing discriminatory systems by relieving an individual of his/her/their personal responsibility to engage in such efforts. Due to the similarities in outcomes for both constructs, research has trended toward looking at negative self-stereotyping and outgroup favoritism as interactive system justification components, but this is an area still under discussion.

=== Depressed entitlement ===
Within the psychological literature, entitlement is defined as the judgments people make about their deservingness of specific outcomes based upon their identity or their actions. In 1997, as part of the evolving solidification of system justification theory, Jost and Banaji proposed that one of the important cognitive mechanisms for reconciling outgroup favoritism is a depressed sense of what a given individual deserves. Essentially, in order to hold the idea that the outgroup is more favorable and therefore more deserving of specific outcomes that preserve the status quo, the oppressed ingroup must rationalize these beliefs with a depressed sense of entitlement to various cognitive, social, and psychological resources within a system.

The classic study in this area was conducted by Jost in 1997. Jost recruited 132 undergraduate students (68 men and 64 women) from Yale College. The participants were asked to generate "open-ended thought-lists" in response to a prompt and later evaluate the quality and deservingness of their own efforts. The thought-lists were then rated by two independent judges (one woman and one man) who were unaware of the hypotheses and the gender of the participants. The judges evaluated the thought-lists on seven dimensions: meaningfulness, logicality, sophistication, vividness, persuasiveness, originality, and insightfulness.

The purpose of this rating procedure was to ensure that there were no differences in the objective quality of thought-lists generated by men and women. Jost found that the independent judges perceived no differences in quality between thought-lists written by men and thought-lists written by women on any of the eight dimensions, indicating that the objective quality of the thought-lists did not differ based on the gender of the author. However, when participants evaluated and paid themselves for their thought-list contributions, women's self-ratings were significantly lower than men's self-ratings on the dimensions of self-payment and insight. According to Jost, the finding that the independent judges did not perceive any differences in the quality of thought-lists generated by men and women, but women evaluated and paid themselves differently by rating their own contributions lower than men demonstrated the "depressed-entitlement effect" observed in previous research. Specifically, that depressed entitlement may be the cognitive mechanism that leads to the expression of outgroup preference (though, like most dimensions of system justification theory, this is a matter of academic debate).

=== Role of individual belief systems ===
==== Just-world fallacy ====
Originally proposed by Melvin J. Lerner in 1980, the just-world fallacy proposes that individuals have a need to believe that their environment is a just and orderly place where people usually get what they deserve. In confirming the existence of this cognitive bias, Lerner and Simmons conducted what has now become the classic study in the just world fallacy literature. Incorporating heavy influence from Stanley Milgram, the researchers asked participants to observe a confederate receiving electric shocks. The severity of the shocks and the innocence of the victim were manipulated. The researchers found that participants tended to derogate the victim more when the shocks were severe, suggesting that people are more likely to blame innocent victims when the outcomes are more negative.

Given the advances in ethics in the social sciences that constrain such methodologies, but still inspired by Lerner and Simmons' original work, current research in this area commonly involves presenting participants with scenarios or vignettes that involve innocent victims experiencing negative outcomes. Participants are then asked to evaluate the victims and assign responsibility or blame for their situation. These studies often manipulate the severity of the outcome or the perceived innocence of the victim to examine how these factors influence participants' reactions. Extensions of this work typically involve manipulating factors such as the attractiveness or likability of the victim, the presence of empathy instructions, or the level of personal involvement in the situation. These studies consistently show that people are more likely to derogate innocent victims when they perceive the world as just and orderly.

In terms of outgroup favoritism, researchers have proposed that just world beliefs potentially contribute to the expression of favorable attitudes toward advantaged groups. Specifically, some researchers propose that just world beliefs serve as an ideological foundation for outgroup favoritism, the logic being that in a just and fair hierarchical system, a position of advantage is internally attributable to the members of the advantaged group (i.e., advantaged group members must deserve what they have because the world is a fair place).

==== Meritocracy ====
In a similar vein to just world beliefs, the American Psychological Association's dictionary defines meritocracy as a system that rewards individuals based on what they accomplish within said system. Specifically, the term was first credited to the sociologist Michael Young in his book The Rise of the Meritocracy. Given the complexity of meritocracy as a concept, researchers have historically focused on the role of meritocratic beliefs in informing prejudices and biases. For example, several sociological and psychological scholars have found that meritocratic beliefs are correlated with increased prejudice and discrimination on the basis of aspects of social identity like gender or educational status. In terms of outgroup favoritism, researchers have proposed that meritocratic beliefs serve a similar role to those of just world beliefs, meaning that meritocratic beliefs may serve as a form of ideological foundation leading to an increase in outgroup preference.

== Negative consequences ==
The third stream of literature on outgroup favoritism is dedicated to examining the consequences minority group members might bear as a result of holding implicit preferences for outgroup members. Numerous studies examining members of minority groups have found that expressions of outgroup favoritism correlate with a number of different detrimental psychological outcomes under specific conditions. Specifically, that while outgroup favoritism and other system justification motives serve palliative functions, there is a point at which reality/perception incongruence inhibits this palliative effect. Outgroup favoritism appears to be beneficial to psychological wellbeing depending on the individual's level of internalization of dominant ideologies and their awareness of system rigidity.

To exemplify how this works: a 2007 study examining the psychological health of 316 Black undergraduates found that implicit outgroup favoritism (i.e., African American students implicitly favoring Whites) is correlated with increased depression and lower overall psychological functioning. However, since this study other scholars have examined the relationships between implicit "anti-Black" bias, the centrality of social identity, and psychological health. These studies found that while Black participants with higher levels of anti-Black bias were found to be at higher risk for depression, this outcome varied as a function of the amount of racial discrimination they perceived to begin with. Such findings support the dual-outcome model of outgroup favoritism (particularly for minority groups). On the one hand, outgroup favoritism can lead to benefits by allowing individuals to justify systems of inequality. Yet once the evidence that inequality exists becomes salient enough, such tendencies actually lead to decreases in psychological well-being as individuals begin to attribute perceived discrimination internally (i.e., to themselves) rather than externally.

== Critiques ==
As somewhat alluded to in the previous sections, academics are continuing to discuss the nature of system justification theory (and by extension, outgroup favoritism). Considering outgroup favoritism as part of the broader ecosystem of system justification theory means accepting the basic premise that the need to justify the systemic status quo is sufficiently powerful that people will endorse ideologies and practices supportive of "the norm" even when these ideologies and practices run counter to their own interests. Yet, in a debate that continues to the present day, outgroup favoritism has been critiqued as contradicting the long-standing idea that strong identification with the group on an individual level will generate the opposite (i.e., individuals are motivated to preserve a positive image of their own group. Specifically, critics argue that the instances of outgroup favoritism thus far observed within the literature are best attributed to demand characteristics or the internalization of social norms (which inherently elevate the status of the dominant group).

=== Interactions with social identity theory ===
This perspective is echoed in some of the broader critiques of system justification theory—particularly those emphasizing that a need for "social accuracy" and a "positively distinct social identity" are sufficient to explain the expression of outgroup favoritism observed by members of low-status groups. In 2023, Rubin and colleagues posited a new model for understanding outgroup favoritism within the context of social identity theory (of which ingroup favoritism is a core component). They termed this new model the Social Identity Model of System Attitudes (SIMSA). Within SISMA, the authors propose that outgroup favoritism is instead best understood as a functional adaptation that fulfills a social-identity-based need to perceived the social world in an accurate way.

In a published rejoinder in the British Journal of Social Psychology, Jost and colleagues refuted this idea as incorrectly equating outgroup favoritism with the accurate perception of an unjust reality. The main argument being that outgroup favoritism goes beyond simply acknowledging that a system is unjust or unfair, but rather demonstrates a motivated preference for the prioritization of a group outside of one's own. Citing the work on implicit associations, negative self-stereotyping, and depressed entitlement, Jost and his colleagues emphasize that if outgroup favoritism was merely an expression of accurate social perception, scholars would not have observed the cognitive mechanisms people employ whilst expressing outgroup favoritism if it did not serve some system-justifying function above and beyond a social-identity one. Rubin and colleagues have since responded by clarifying their position, arguing that they were not equating outgroup favoritism with acceptance of an unjust social reality but rather accurate perception. Jost and his colleagues have yet to respond.

== See also ==
- Allophilia
- Endophobia
- Reverse discrimination
- Self-hatred
- Internalized oppression
