= A. A. Phillips =

Australian writer, critic, and teacher

- Born: Arthur Angell Phillips; 15 August 1900; Melbourne, Victoria, Australia
- Died: 4 November 1985 (aged 85); Melbourne, Victoria, Australia
- Occupation(s): Writer, teacher

Arthur Angell Phillips (15 August 1900 – 4 November 1985), generally known as A. A. Phillips, was an Australian writer, critic and teacher, best known for coining the term "cultural cringe" in his pioneering essay The Cultural Cringe (1950), which set the early terms for post-colonial theory in Australia.

== Early life ==
Philips was born in Melbourne. His father was a lawyer and his mother was a novel writer. He was educated at Melbourne Grammar School and at the Universities of Melbourne and Oxford, and later taught at Wesley College in Melbourne.

== Cultural Cringe theory ==
The Cultural Cringe was first published in the Melbourne cultural affairs journal Meanjin. It explored ingrained feelings of inferiority that local intellectuals struggled against, and which were most clearly pronounced in the Australian theatre, music, art and letters. Phillips pointed out that the public widely assumed that anything produced by local dramatists, actors, musicians, artists and writers was necessarily deficient when compared against the works of European counterparts. The only ways local arts professionals could build themselves up in public esteem was either to follow overseas fashions, or, more often, to spend a period of time working in Britain. In some professions this attitude even affected employment opportunities, with only those who had worked in London being treated as worthy of appointment or promotion. Thus the cultural cringe brought about over the early to mid 20th century a pattern of temporary residence in Britain for so many young talented Australians across a broad range of fields, from the arts to the sciences.

Phillips's influential and highly controversial essay served as the focus in his later book The Australian Tradition: Essays in Colonial Culture (1958).

== Awards ==
Phillips was honoured by the University of Melbourne with an honorary doctorate in 1975. Later the same university made him a patron in 1978.

== Bibliography ==
- "The cultural cringe" Meanjin (1950)
- The Australian Tradition: Studies in Colonial Culture, (Melbourne: Cheshire, 1958)
- "Henry Lawson revisited". Meanjin Quarterly. 24 (1): 4–17. March 1965.
- Responses: Selected Writings, (Melbourne: Australia International Press and Publications Pty Ltd, 1979)

== See also ==
- Culture of Australia
