= Reverse discrimination =

Discrimination against members of a dominant or majority group

Reverse discrimination is a term used to describe discrimination against members of a dominant or majority group, in favor of members of a minority or historically disadvantaged group. Reverse discrimination based on race or ethnicity is also called reverse racism.

== Equality of opportunity and substantive equality ==
Philosopher Richard Arneson argues that while a program of reverse discrimination favoring non-White candidates over White ones may violate equality of opportunity in a formal sense, it may more effectively promote substantive equality. The Dilemma of difference refers to the difference between the two equality concepts.

== Affirmative action ==
Affirmative action is a set of practices that attempts to promote diversity in areas such as employment, education, and leadership, typically by reserving some positions for people of traditionally disadvantaged groups. This may result in discrimination towards successful majority groups who have greater technical qualifications than minority applicants.

Philosopher James Rachels posited that reverse discrimination as a factor in affirmative action in the United States may disadvantage some Whites, but without it, African Americans would likewise be disadvantaged by pervasive racial discrimination in society. Critics of racial preferences in affirmative action such as William Bennett and Carl Cohen have argued that explicitly using race for the purpose of ending racial discrimination is illogical and contrary to the principle of non-discrimination. Conversely, Alan H. Goldman argued that short-term violations of such a principle could be justified for the sake of equalizing social opportunities in the longer term. It is often argued by majority groups that they are being discriminated against for hiring and advancement because of affirmative action policies. However, critics of this argument often cite the "symbolic" significance of a job has to be taken into consideration as well as qualifications.

== By race, ethnicity or caste ==
=== China ===
The affirmative action of the Chinese government has been called into question, especially from the ethnic group of Han Chinese. Unfair policies on Chinese college entrance exams (Gaokao) as well as human rights considered to be favoring the national minority have both been believed to be causing reverse discrimination in the mainland. Han chauvinism has been becoming more popular in mainland China since the 2000s, the cause of which has been attributed to the discontent towards Chinese affirmative action. The one-child policy was only introduced for Han Chinese, with minorities being allowed two or more babies.

However, under Xi Jinping, the concept of a Chinese Dream is believed to have distinctly Han dimensions, and it is also believed to support Han chauvinism even if it is unwittingly doing so. The fusion of traditional Han chauvinism with Chinese nationalism as practised by the modern Chinese state has been described as Han-centrism.

=== India ===
In India, in higher education institutions and in employment by Government, around 49.5% seats are reserved for members of socially disadvantaged castes. Reserved category candidates can select a position from the Open 40% also.

In India, the term is often used by citizens protesting against reservation in India.

=== Russia ===
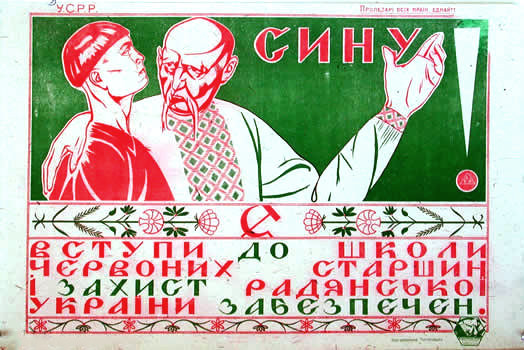
The 1921 Soviet recruitment to the Military Education poster with the Ukrainization theme, using the Ukrainian language instead of the Russian language.

In the Soviet Union, korenizatsiya was the process of promoting the culture and power of non-Russian ethnicities in their specific Soviet republics. The early Bolshevik authorities saw it as a means to counteract Great Russian chauvinism. By the 1930s, Joseph Stalin had ended the policy, and promoted Russification.

=== United States ===
Opponents of affirmative action in the United States use the term reverse discrimination to say that such programs discriminate against White Americans in favor of African Americans. In the U.S., affirmative action has focused on the under-representation of ethnic minority groups and women, and attempted to remedy the effects of past discrimination in both government and the business world. Historian Nancy MacLean writes that during the 1980s and 1990s, "so-called reverse discrimination occurred on an inconsequential scale". The number of reverse discrimination cases filed with the Equal Employment Opportunity Commission (EEOC) doubled in the 1990s and continued to reflect a growing percentage of all discrimination cases as of 2003.

==== Colleges ====
White college applicants who have felt passed over in favor of less-qualified Black students as a result of affirmative action in college admissions have described such programs as "reverse discrimination". Elizabeth Purdy argues that this conception of reverse discrimination came close to overturning affirmative action during the conservative resurgence of the 1980s and '90s after being granted legitimacy by the U.S. Supreme Court's ruling in Regents of the University of California v. Bakke, which ruled that Alan Bakke had been discriminated against by the school's admissions program.

In 1996, the University of Texas had to defer the use of racial preferences in their college admissions after the US Court of Appeals for the Fifth Circuit barred the school from considering race in admitting students. The ruling determined that diversity in education could not justify making race-based distinctions. Hopwood v. Texas in 1996 was a lawsuit brought by four white applicants to the Texas Law School who were denied admission even though their grade point averages were greater than minority applications that were accepted. The four white students also had greater Law School Admission Test scores.

However, in Grutter v. Bollinger in 2003, the Supreme Court allowed the University of Michigan Law School to continue to consider race among other relevant diversity factors. The decision was the only legally challenged affirmative-action policy to survive the courts. However, this ruling has led to confusion among universities and lower courts alike regarding the status of affirmative action across the nation.

In 2012, Fisher v. University of Texas reached the Supreme Court. The University of Texas allegedly used race as a factor in denying Abigail Fisher's application, denying her a fair review. The lower courts upheld the program, but the Supreme Court vacated the judgment of the lower courts and sent the case back to the Fifth Circuit for review.

==== Complaints ====
A draft report on claims of reverse discrimination was prepared for the United States Department of Labor in 1995. (Note: The report, by Rutgers University law professor Alfred W. Blumrosen, stated there were at most 100 reverse-discrimination cases among at least 3,000 discrimination opinions by Federal district and appeals courts from 1990 to 1994. National surveys showed only a few whites had experienced reverse discrimination, and 5 to 12 percent of whites believed that they had been denied a job or promotion because of it. 2% of cases were of white men charging sexual, racial or national origin discrimination and 1.8% were of white women charging racial discrimination.) Its analysis of employment discrimination cases in federal courts between 1990 and 1994 concluded that between 1 and 3 percent involved claims of reverse discrimination; and that a "high proportion" of the claims were found to be without merit.

Newer reports by the EEOC have found that less than 10% of race-related complaints were filed by whites. When national samples of whites were asked if they personally have experienced the loss of job, promotion, or college admission because of their race, 2%–13% say yes.

== By sex, gender or sexual orientation ==
A 2019 study by S. K. Camara & M. P. Orbe collected narratives of individuals describing situations where they were discriminated against based on their majority-group status (cases of reverse discrimination), a smaller portion reported gender discrimination. A 2008 study found 18% of gender-related complaints and 4% of the court cases were filed by men.

A small number of heterosexuals reported experiencing discrimination based on their sexual orientation.

== By economic status ==
In Reservation in India, a 10% quota is reserved for members of Economically Weaker Section, which has been criticized as reverse discrimination.

== By citizenship or nationality ==
=== European Union ===
In European Union law, reverse discrimination occurs where a Member State's national law provides for worse treatment of its own citizens or domestic products than other EU citizens/goods under EU law. This is permitted in the EU because of the legal principle of subsidiarity, that EU law is not applicable in situations purely internal to one Member State.

== See also ==
- Allophilia
- Double standard
- Endophobia
- Internalized oppression
- Minoritarianism
- Outgroup favoritism
- Paradox of tolerance
- Prejudice plus power
- Xenophilia

=== Gender ===
- All-women shortlists
- Housing discrimination
- Male expendability
- Women and children first (protocol)
- Women's parking space

=== Race ===
- Afrocentrism
- Anti-racism
- Black Economic Empowerment (South Africa)
- Racial color blindness
- Land reform in Zimbabwe
- Malaysian New Economic Policy
- Ricci v. DeStefano
- White guilt

=== Other ===
- Economically Weaker Section
- Creamy layer
