= Romantic racism =

Form of racism where the oppressor projects their fantasies onto the oppressed

Romantic racism is a form of racism in which members of a dominant group transpose their fantasies onto members of oppressed groups. People such as Norman Mailer, Jack Kerouac, and other Beatnik authors of the 1950s have been accused of romantic racism. They maintain that the dominant mainstream culture of the 1950s in the United States stressed conformity and held up middle-class suburban families as the cultural ideal, and that it was indifferent to art and literature, upheld racial segregation, and despised or ignored black achievements, such as jazz. Those, like the novelist Norman Mailer, who felt limited by or alienated from mainstream culture, sought out influences from other cultures as a form of rebellion. This romanticization is based in stereotypes created by the dominant group.

Mailer's essay "The White Negro" offers a clear description of this romanticization of the racial Other in American culture. Mailer, a fan of jazz music, created his concept of what it meant to be "hip", or a member of the white urban counterculture, largely on his perception of the culture of urban African-Americans (with whom the expression "hip", meaning "in the know", originated).

Critics consider Mailer's depictions of what he imagines African-American life to be like as an instance of what they call "romantic racism", contending that he implies that life in urban ghettoes—depicted as filled with sex, drugs, and violence—is somehow enriched, rather than hurt, by poverty and crime. Mailer's essay has also been criticized for spreading the stereotype of African-American men as hypermasculine and hypersexual.

== See also ==
- Exoticism
- Objectification
- Orientalism
- Racial fetishism
- Race and sexuality
- Xenocentrism
