= Clientitis =

Alleged tendency of overseas staff to favor a host country

Clientitis (also called clientism or localitis) is the alleged tendency of resident in-country staff of an organization to regard the officials and people of the host country as "clients". The condition can occur in business, military, or government settings, and is somewhat similar to the phrase "going native".

== Overview ==
This condition can be found in business, military, or government. The term clientitis is somewhat similar to the phrases "gone native" or "going native", and may have its origins in the 19th century when small diplomatic missions were staffed by long-term expatriates with distant connections to their home country. In the 20th and 21st centuries, rapid communication with home ministries, and frequent rotations of staff, have made the term anachronistic and less relevant in a modern diplomatic context.

A hypothetical example of clientitis would be a Foreign Service Officer (FSO) or foreign diplomat, serving overseas at an Embassy, who drifts into a mode of rationalizing and defending the actions of the host country government. In such an example, the officer has come to view the officials and government workers of the host country government as the persons he is serving. Former USUN Ambassador John Bolton has used this term disparagingly to describe the culture of the US State Department, but the available public record shows little genuine evidence of modern diplomatic clientitis.

An example from business would be a representative for a company living in another nation, representing that company to the host nation and other institutions in that country. A business representative suffering clientitis would defend the host country government and operating environment as if those were his employers. A military example would be a defense attaché who identifies reflexively with the host country's military establishment.

== Within the US State Department ==
The State Department's training for newly appointed ambassadors warns of the danger of clientitis, and the Department rotates FSOs every 2–3 years to avoid it. During the Nixon administration the State Department's Global Outlook Program (GLOP) attempted to combat clientitis by transferring FSOs to regions outside their area of specialization.

Robert D. Kaplan alleges that the problem "became particularly prevalent" among American diplomats in the Middle East because the investment of time needed to learn Arabic and the large number of diplomatic postings where it was spoken meant diplomats could spend their entire career in a single region.

Anthony Lake argues that while clientitis is a danger, reflexive accusations of it can deter Foreign Service Officers from providing accurate analysis to policymakers. In modern practice, with tight control from Washington or any other home office, and narrow advancement paths requiring deference to career interests, clientitis (as much as appeasement) is an obsolete label for diplomacy, and use of the stereotype may reflect an anti-elitist or unilateralist agenda. In contrast, caustic and realism-based diplomats' analyses, including recently those of former UK Ambassador Kim Darroch and former US Ambassador Michael McFaul, demonstrate diplomats' main purpose in providing unvarnished opinion, at risk of angering the host government.

In the 1990s the phenomenon was seen within the State Department as being particularly acute in El Salvador, reflecting "both the polarization of the country and the highly ideological position of the United States within that polarization."

Revelations about US diplomatic cables however show how "U.S. ambassadors really felt about their host governments and gave an unvarnished view of the inner workings of American diplomacy. [And] sparked diplomatic firestorms across the world that left the State Department reeling." Rather than identifying with host countries, modern diplomats compete with a range of open media and news sources to gain the attention and favor of their home offices, resulting in sharp, opinionated reporting identifying the national interests at stake, potential advantages to be gained, and sometimes writing attention-getting travelogues of local cultural conditions.

In To The Secretary, former diplomat Mary Thompson-Jones "describes several types of cables: official updates, scene setters, biographical profiles, spot reports, daily media reaction and situation reports. "Knowing by instinct when and what to communicate back home is what makes a good diplomat," she writes. "Their reporting must walk a line between loyally carrying out assignments from Washington, while making essential, sometimes contradictory, points to a foreign policy establishment that does not always want to hear them."

== See also ==
- Oikophobia
