= Collective depression =

Collective mental state

Collective depression is one of many collective mental states, such as collective elation, collective paranoia, collective trauma, or collective grief, which may affect a group, community or whole nation. It is characterised by a prevailing and seemingly permanent sense of inadequacy, despondency, lack of vitality, sadness and hopelessness, shared by a high proportion of the members of a collectivity. The work of Gustave Le Bon, writing in 1895, suggests that it may be passed by social contagion, in a way similar to a physical condition.

== Information ==
Collective depression is often found in detained communities, such as ghettos, concentration camps or other places where all prospects of release are extremely improbable, and is recognisable by a high incidence of suicide.

There is debate over the philosophical status of the concept: while Sigmund Freud, Carl Jung, Franz Borkenau and many others accepted the existence of a collective mind or collective unconscious, much modern thinking treats collective depression as an aggregate of individuals depressions. However, there is growing interest in the concept of mass sociogenic illness where a physical or psychological condition is observed to spread within a group without a common organic cause.

== Treatment ==
The remedy for collective depression is the restoration of hope, though this may be a task beyond the capabilities of any leader of a community. Collective depression can also be a state of considerable vulnerability, as destructive strategies may be clutched at through misplaced belief in the efficacy of radical measures.
