= Allophilia =

Positive attitude towards others who are different

Allophilia scale

In sociology, allophilia is the phenomenon of having a positive attitude towards members of an out-group. The out-group member can be anyone who possesses characteristics that are different from one's own (the in-group), such as a person who does not belong to the same race or ethnicity, culture, or religion. It is a framework for understanding effective inter-group leadership and is conceptualized as a measurable state of mind with tangible consequences.

The allophilia scale measures affection, comfort, engagement, enthusiasm, and kinship. It has been adapted and validated to other languages like Italian and Spanish and also to various settings, such as to measure positive attitude toward people with dementia, as well as younger and older adults.

Allophilia predicts positive relationships with out-group members. For instance, a study in Spain shows that students having higher allophilia had lower social distance towards people with obesity. Besides, positive experience with out-group members may increase allophilia, as it is shown in a longitudinal study of a cook's tour in Vietnam; in that study, the participants, who were Americans, reported positive feelings toward Vietnamese mirroring allophilia facets in nearly 10 years after the event. In one study, symhedonia (experiencing empathic joy) has been shown to be more closely associated with increased levels of allophilia, while sympathy (experiencing empathic sorrow) has been shown to be more strongly associated with decreased levels of prejudice. Allophilia enhancement can serve as complement to prejudice reduction.

== Terminology ==
The term allophilia was coined by Professor Todd Pittinsky of Harvard University in 2006 after he was unable to find an antonym for prejudice in any dictionary. The term derived from Greek words meaning "liking or love of the other."

== Prejudice and positive intergroup relations ==
The typical remedy for prejudice is to bring conflicting groups into a state of tolerance. However, tolerance is not the logical antithesis of prejudice, but rather is the midpoint between negative feelings and positive feelings toward others.

== See also ==
- Allport's Scale
- Malinchism
- Oikophobia
- Outgroup favoritism
- Paradox of tolerance
- Reverse discrimination
- Self-hatred
- Xenophilia
