= Collective mental state =

Mental state which is shared by individuals in a group, organization, or society

Collective mental state is generally a literary or legal term, mostly used in sociology and philosophy (in addition to its singular use in psychiatry and psychology), to refer to the condition of someone's state and physical and mental being when in the presence of others. An assessment of a collective mental state includes a description of thought processes, memory, emotions, mood, cognitive state, and energy levels, including the meta overlay of interactions between individuals.

== Overview ==
A collective mental state is both distinct from and contains other mental states of self-aware individuals. The collective mental state forms the basis for individual reflection, juxtaposed with the collective state, that leads to realizations about emotions, states of being, and individuality. The collective mental state is made of conscious minds and may therefore be a more complex version of something like a stampede, which is itself caused by sentinel animals through imitation. Collective mental states may be simulated through the use of a performer and audience; stand-up comedy desires to have a group of people collectively, simultaneously feel one thing: laughter.

== Background ==
When a mental state is shared by a large proportion of the members of a group or society, it can be called a collective mental state. Gustave Le Bon proposed that mental states are passed by contagion, while Sigmund Freud wrote of war fever in his work Group Psychology and the Analysis of the Ego (1922), a perfect example of the collective mental state. Franz Borkenau wrote of collective madness, while many writers have discussed collective depression. Psychosis can be passed from one individual to another as induced psychosis or folie à deux, but rarely involves more than two people. When the mental state involves a large population, it is more appropriate to use plain English rather than psychiatric or psychological terminology.

=== Instances of collective mental states ===
- Church (congregation) with collective states like prayer, worship, hymns, speaking in tongues, etc.
- Sports with collective audience states, like booing; bullfighting, WWE, football, American football (including the collective home viewership of these things)
- Concerts where moshing and collective singing occurs
- Riot
- Carnivalesque
- Racism
- Horror film audience

A positive example of a collective mental state would be at a rave or music festival. People come together through music and may feel content or relaxed, even though they may be surrounded by strangers in a loud, stimulating environment. On the other hand, in a dangerous situation, people can experience high levels of fear and anxiety if they are in a group of people that is panicking. An example of this is when a large group try to get out of a building and the individuals at the front are crushed against the doors by the weight of the people behind them.

A type of angry collective state is often referred to as mob mentality. The members of the group feed off of each other's anger and the collective mental state can become very aggressive, as part of the experience is a reduced sense of responsibility for each individual.

== See also ==
- Category of being – In ontology, the highest kinds or genera of entities
- Collective consciousness – Shared beliefs and ideas in society
- Collective depression – Collective mental state
- Collective identity – Shared sense of belonging to a group
- Collective intelligence – Group intelligence that emerges from collective efforts
- Collective narcissism – Psychological tendency to exaggerate the positive image of one's social group
- Collective responsibility – Responsibility of organizations, groups and societies
- Community – Social unit which shares commonality
- Crowd – Group who have gathered for a common purpose or intent
- Crowd psychology – Branch of social psychology
- Dialogical self – The mind's ability to imagine different positions of participants in an internal dialogue
- Emotional contagion – Spontaneous spread of emotions among a group
- Entitativity – Concept in social psychology
- False consensus effect – Attributional type of cognitive bias
- Group dynamics – System of behaviors within or between social groups
- Group mind (science fiction) – Plot device used in science-fiction stories
- Groupthink – Psychological phenomenon that occurs within a group of people
- Identity (social science) – Qualities, beliefs, personality, looks and/or expressions that distinguish a person
- Mass hysteria – Spread of illness without organic cause
- Mob rule – Democracy spoiled by demagoguery and the rule of passion over reason
- National identity – Identity or sense of belonging to one state or one nation
- Philosophy of mind – Branch of philosophy
- Social identity theory – Concept in social psychology
- Social movement – Group sharing social or political objectives
- Stampede – Panicked running of a large group of animals
- Social group collective – Social groups
- Transportation theory (psychology) – Psychological theory
