= Anti-Canadian sentiment =

Hostility towards Canada

Anti-Canadian sentiment, also known as anti-Canadianism, refers to hostility, prejudice, criticism, discrimination, or negative attitudes directed toward Canada, Canadians, Canadian culture, or the Canadian identity. The phenomenon has been observed both outside and within Canada and may arise from political, cultural, economic, historical, or diplomatic disputes.

Expressions of anti-Canadian sentiment have occurred in various countries, mostly from the United States, and contexts, including reactions to Canadian foreign policy, trade disputes, perceptions of Canadian nationalism, and opposition to Canadian influence abroad. Within Canada, anti-Canadian sentiment has also been associated with regional and nationalist movements, particularly in Quebec, where it has at times intersected with Quebec nationalism, as well as with criticism of the Canadian state by some Indigenous peoples and regional political movements.

The intensity and character of anti-Canadian sentiment have varied over time and by region, ranging from political criticism and cultural stereotyping to discrimination against Canadians and opposition to Canadian institutions and symbols.

== Historical ==
Voltaire reputedly joked that Canada was "a few acres of snow". He was, in fact, referring to New France as it existed in the 18th century. The quote meant that New France was economically worthless and that France thus did not need to keep it. Many Canadians believe Voltaire's statement to be more of an indictment of conquest in general.

In 1853, Henry David Thoreau opened his account of a trip to Quebec with the following observation:

I fear that I have not got much to say about Canada, not having seen much; what I got by going to Canada was a cold.

== Modern perceptions ==
Results of 2017 BBC World Service poll. Views of Canada's influence by country
Country polled	Positive	Negative	Neutral	P − N
Pakistan	26%	30%	44%	−4
Indonesia	32%	26%	32%	6
Turkey	43%	36%	21%	7
Peru	42%	23%	35%	19
India	37%	16%	47%	21
Russia	36%	15%	49%	21
Nigeria	55%	25%	20%	30
Kenya	54%	23%	23%	31
Spain	59%	9%	32%	50
Mexico	69%	12%	19%	57
Brazil	71%	12%	17%	59
Germany	63%	2%	35%	61
Greece	70%	4%	26%	66
China	82%	11%	7%	71
United States	87%	5%	8%	82
Australia	91%	5%	4%	86
France	92%	5%	3%	87
United Kingdom	94%	5%	1%	89

=== United States ===
In the United States, Canada is often a target of conservative and right-wing commentators who hold the nation up as an example of what a government and society that are too liberal would look like. "Soviet Canuckistan" (full name being The People's Republic of Soviet Canuckistan) is an epithet for Canada, used by Pat Buchanan on October 31, 2002, on his television show on MSNBC in which he denounced Canadians as anti-American and the country as a haven for terrorists. He was reacting to Canadian criticisms of US security measures regarding Arab Canadians.

Buchanan has a history of unflattering references to Canada, having said in 1990 that if Canada were to break apart due to the failure of the Meech Lake Accord, "America would pick up the pieces." He said two years after that, "for most Americans, Canada is sort of like a case of latent arthritis. We really don't think about it, unless it acts up."

In 2005, the year in which Canada refused to participate in an American ballistic missile defence system and in which Paul Martin denounced American environmental policies, a new wave of "anti-Canadian" sentiment was reported. Media articles negatively portraying Canada increased substantially, appearing in newspapers such as the Weekly Standard, The New York Times, and the Wall Street Journal.

In a December 2005 interview, Tucker Carlson remarked on MSNBC that:

First of all, anybody with any ambition at all, or intelligence, has left Canada and is now living in New York. Second, anybody who sides with Canada internationally in a debate between the U.S. and Canada, say, Belgium, is somebody whose opinion we shouldn't care about in the first place. Third, Canada is a sweet country. It is like your retarded cousin you see at Thanksgiving and sort of pat on the head. You know, he's nice, but you don't take him seriously. That's Canada.

As a result of the 2025 United States trade war with Canada and Mexico and U.S. President Donald Trump's threats of making Canada the "51st state", Canadian sports fans began to boo "The Star-Spangled Banner" across sports games in Canada. This resulted in "O Canada" being booed during a National Hockey League game in Nashville between the Ottawa Senators and Nashville Predators. Mutual booing continued during the 4 Nations Face-Off tournament held in February 2025.

=== Russian state media ===
Information confrontation between Russia and Canada has intensified with the Russo-Ukrainian war and deployment of Canadian Armed Forces in Operation Reassurance. Russian sources claim that Canadian elites are normalizing same-sex marriages, recreational drug use and pedophilia. Moscow describes Canadian behaviour as openly anti-Russian and an example of Russophobia.

In January 2019, the Russian state television programme Vesti Nedeli, broadcast on Russia-1, attempted to discredit Ukrainian Canadian communities by casting them as neo-fascists dominating Canada's approach to Russia.

=== Saudi Arabia ===
During the 2018 diplomatic dispute between Saudi Arabia and Canada, Saudi state-aligned media outlets responded to Canadian criticism of Saudi human-rights practices by drawing attention to Canada's own human-rights record, particularly regarding Indigenous peoples. An Al Arabiya segment accused Canada of human rights abuses. (Saudi-owned Al Arabiya broadcasts from Dubai.) On August 6, 2018, a pro-government youth group uploaded a controversial photo that depicted an Air Canada airliner heading towards Toronto's CN Tower with the words "sticking one's nose where it doesn't belong", which was a resemblance to the 9/11 attacks. The account later deleted the Twitter post and apologized and the Ministry of Media of Saudi Arabia ordered the account @Infographic_KSA to shut down "until investigations are completed".

=== India ===
Khalistani activism provides an unflattering lens through which some Indians perceive Canadians. India's External Affairs Minister, Subrahmanyam Jaishankar , described Canada as a place where organized crime, human trafficking, separatism, violence, and terrorism have converged. Pankaj Saran, former Indian deputy national security adviser, accused Canadians of willfully neglecting India's security concerns.

=== Islamic State ===
The Islamic State's former spokesman, Abu Mohammad al-Adnani, called in 2014 for loyalists to the organization worldwide to murder the "Disbelievers" from those countries that took part in the International Action against ISIL, including Canada (which he singled out three times), which was responsible for Operation Impact.

If you kill a disbelieving American or European – especially the spiteful and filthy French – or an Australian, or a Canadian, or any other disbeliever from the disbelievers waging war, including the citizens of the countries that entered into a coalition against the Islamic State, then rely upon Allah, and kill him in any manner or way however it may be.

— Abu Mohammad al-Adnani

=== Brazil ===
Anti-Canadian sentiments have been observed in Brazil. People boycotted Canadian goods to protest a Canadian ban of Brazilian beef imports, reportedly because of fears of mad-cow disease. A few Brazilians believed the Canadian ban was motivated by a trade dispute between the two nations. Canada's subsidies to aircraft manufacturer Bombardier and Brazil's subsidies to Bombardier's Brazilian rival Embraer have been a source of much tension because they are said to interfere with each other's business.

=== Canada ===
Some hostility towards or criticism of Canada as a nation can be seen within Canada itself, most prominently by Quebec nationalists, Newfoundlanders and First Nations. Some First Nations refuse to celebrate Canada Day.

==== Quebec ====
Anti-Canadianism in the Francophone province of Quebec has its roots originally stemming from the resentment since the conquest of New France by Great Britain in 1760, even before the official existence as entities of Canada and Quebec themselves. However, after the Constitution Act, 1867, which officially made Canada a country on July 1, 1867, with four provinces: Ontario, Quebec, Nova Scotia, and New Brunswick, which marked the separate existence and de facto independence and de jure evolutionary independence of Canada, these sentiments developed into Anti-Canadianism. Anti-Canadianism is sometimes intertwined with Quebec nationalism.

From the invasion of New France in the 1760s and the formation of Canada in 1867 until the Quiet Revolution of the 1960s, the economy of Quebec and its high-ranking positions were controlled by the English speaking minority in Quebec, who were always a small minority comprising less than 10% throughout Quebec's post–Royal French Canadian history and who used to be mostly unilingual English speakers, despite the Francophone Québécois' comprising more than 80% of the province's population. This led nationalist thinkers to denounce a colonial phenomenon that, as they believed, was at work between Quebec and the rest of Canada; some hold that residuals of this are still there in the present relationship. Journalist Normand Lester published three volumes of The Black Book of English Canada detailing events of Canadian history he saw as being crimes perpetrated by the majority on the minority.

Quebec, whose sole official language has been French since 1974, has introduced and implemented laws since the 1970s, especially with the adoption of the comprehensive Charter of the French Language Law in 1977 that limits the visibility of English on non-official signs. Commercial signs in languages other than French (especially targeting those in English) have been permitted only if French is given marked prominence in size. This law has been the subject of periodic controversy since its inception. While the architects and advocates of the Charter of the French Language Law argue that it was adopted to promote and protect the French language, critics argue that it is anti-English Canadian in its purpose by rooting out the English language from all spheres in Quebec.

One of the charter's articles stipulates that all children under 16 must receive their primary and secondary education in French schools, unless one of the child's parents has received most of their education in English, in Canada, or the child themselves has already received a substantial part of their education in English, in Canada. Access to elementary and secondary English language schools by non-anglophone immigrants have also been limited by this law.

Lucien Bouchard said that Canada wasn't a "real country", sparking outrage across Canada. He later apologized for the remark.

==== Newfoundland and Labrador ====
Negative stereotypes of Newfoundlanders have been a source of resentment among some residents of Newfoundland and Labrador. In particular, the use of Newfie stereotypes and ethnic jokes, which often portray Newfoundlanders as unintelligent or backward, has been criticized as offensive and discriminatory.

Tensions between Newfoundland and Labrador and the federal government have also occasionally contributed to expressions of regional nationalism. During the 2004–2005 dispute between the provincial and federal governments over offshore resource revenues, former Newfoundland premier Danny Williams ordered all Canadian flags removed from provincial buildings during a dispute with the federal government in 2004. Williams was personally popular in Newfoundland, at times receiving as much as 85% support in polls.

==== Political accusations ====
Sometimes Canadians accuse each other of being anti-Canadian: For example, Manitoba Premier Gary Doer (NDP) accused the governments of Ontario and Alberta of being "anti-Canadian" due to their dislike for equalization payments.

== Anti-Canadianism and humour ==
Humorous anti-Canadianism often focuses on broadly known attributes of Canada and Canadians such as cold weather or public health care, as the finer details of Canadian culture and politics are generally not well known outside Canada. The sport of curling is also treated with some irreverence in the United States and most of Europe. However, these broad targets are more accurately caricatured within Canada itself. The fact that others are perceived to know surprisingly little about Canada is a frequent theme in Canadian humour and such examples of self-deprecating humour are nearly universal among Canadian humorists. In keeping with this attitude, some satirical or critical expressions, such as "Soviet Canuckistan", have also been used ironically within Canadian political and cultural discourse.

In a similar vein, the 2024 song "Not Like Us" by American rapper Kendrick Lamar has become an unofficial anti-Canadian song due to the target being Drake, who is the country's biggest rapper. The song was referenced by Argentina after they defeated Canada in the semifinals of the 2024 Copa América and was played by USA Basketball after they defeated Canada in an exhibition game before the 2024 Summer Olympics.

== See also ==
- Canadian values
- South Park (various episodes, also Blame Canada)
- I Am Canadian
- War Plan Red
- Alberta separatism
