= Xenocentrism =

Preference for the cultural practices of societies other than one's own

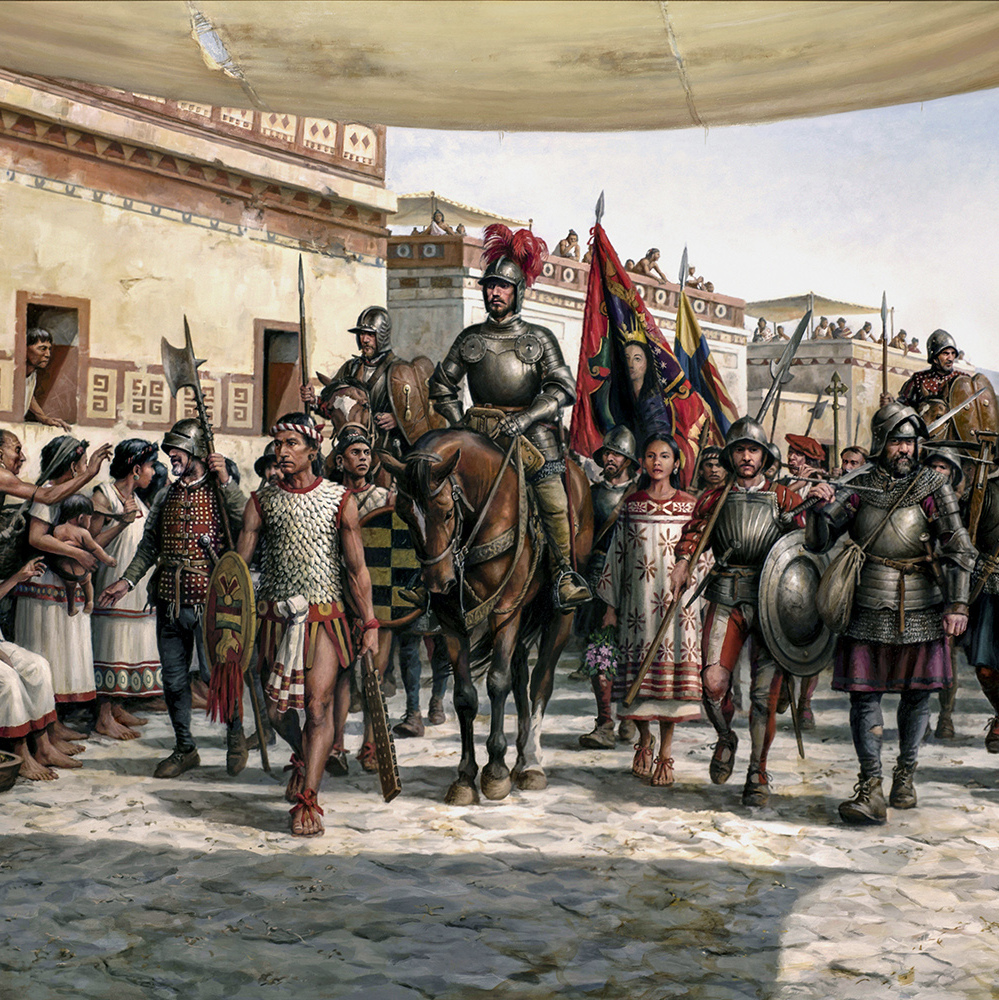
Hernan Cortes being fawned over by locals as he enters Tenochtitlan

Xenocentrism is the preference for the cultural practices of other cultures and societies, such as how they live and what they eat, rather than of one's own social way of life. One example is the romanticization of the noble savage in the 18th-century primitivism movement in European art, philosophy and ethnography.

Xenocentrism can be a type of ethnocentrism. Because ethnocentrism is often negative and characterized by perceived superiority of one's own society to others, it often contrasts with xenocentrism.

== Etymology ==
The term xenocentrism was coined by American sociologists Donald P. Kent and Robert G. Burnight in the 1952 paper "Group Centrism in Complex Societies" published in the American Journal of Sociology. Kent and Burnight state that feelings of xenocentrism are caused by three possible factors; individuals who have familial ties to a foreign country, specifically 2nd or 3rd generation immigrants, those who oppose the political choices of their native country. One example of this is the Communist Party USA. The party idealized the Soviet Union and its anti-capitalist government. As well as individuals who are exposed to other cultures and grow disenchanted with their society, and then rebel against it. This word remained obscure but considered useful and occasionally used by other sociologists. The University of Florida treats it as a key term of Sociology.

The term is opposed to ethnocentrism, as coined by 19th-century American sociologist William Graham Sumner, which describes the natural tendency of an individual to place disproportionate worth upon the values and beliefs of one's own culture relative to others.

== Examples ==
=== Consumer xenocentrism ===
Rene Dentiste Mueller and Amanda Broderick were the first to apply the consumer xenocentrism (CX) concept to describe the preference that some consumers have for foreign goods, even when domestic goods are qualitatively and/or functionally similar or better. Although the CX phenomenon is global, the researchers cite a significant number of studies that suggest there are proportionally more consumer xenocentrics in former colonies where the locals have been conditioned to perceive ‘foreign’ as better. A consequence of consumer xenocentrism is its negative effect on local industry and on the decline in living standards as poor consumers buy the (often) more expensive foreign products. Consumer xenocentrism, especially among the local elites, reduces confidence and pride in local manufacturing which can lead to the loss of local industries, a decline in purchase choices, especially among traditional products or even a dependency on foreign ones. Mueller, Wang, Liu and Cui, applied the concept to China and showed consumer xenocentrism is not a new phenomenon. The researchers were also able to show that when consumer xenocentrism grew too much, a ‘protection of the herd’ mentality caused the pendulum to swing back towards consumer ethnocentrism (nationalism).

In his doctoral dissertation, Steven James Lawrence suggests xenocentrism may be influential in making consumers buying decisions as they might have "favorable orientations to products from outside their membership group."

Puja Mondal cited some examples from India: "People in India often assume that British lifestyle (dress pattern, etc.), French fashion or Japanese electronic devices (TV, tape recorders, mobile set, washing machines, etc.) and Swiss watches are superior to their own."

Grace Susetyo suggests "the idea that foreign cultures and their elements are superior to the local" causes a crisis of cultural identity among Western-educated Indonesians and is a problem that needs to be eradicated.

George Balabanis and Adamantios Diamantopoulos further defined consumer xenocentrism to be a multi-dimensional construct by which to explain consumer affinities for foreign products. They define consumer xenocentrism to be rooted in two concepts, perceived inferiority of domestic goods and aggrandized perception of foreign products.

The Academy of International Business is studying "out of group favoritism and in-group derogation" as a consumer effect in the Chinese consumer market.

=== Measurement of consumer xenocentrism ===
Lawrence uses the definition of xenocentrism, conceived by Kent and Burnight, to propose a scale, CXENO, to predict how xenocentric views of non-domestic goods affects consumer behavior. The most recently proposed scale to quantify xenocentric consumer tendencies, XSCALE, includes both instances of social and consumer xenocentrism.

Economists have begun to include consumer xenocentrism, along with other consumer centrisms such as consumer ethnocentrism and consumer cosmopolitanism, in their analysis of consumer behavior. Most recent research has looked at how these three centrisms compound.

== See also ==
- Consumer affinity
- Allophilia
- Allosemitism
- Cultural cringe
- Exoticism
- Jingri
- Negrophilia
- Oikophobia
- Orientalism
- Philosemitism
- Racial fetishism
- Xenophilia
