= Internalized ableism =

Concept in disability studies

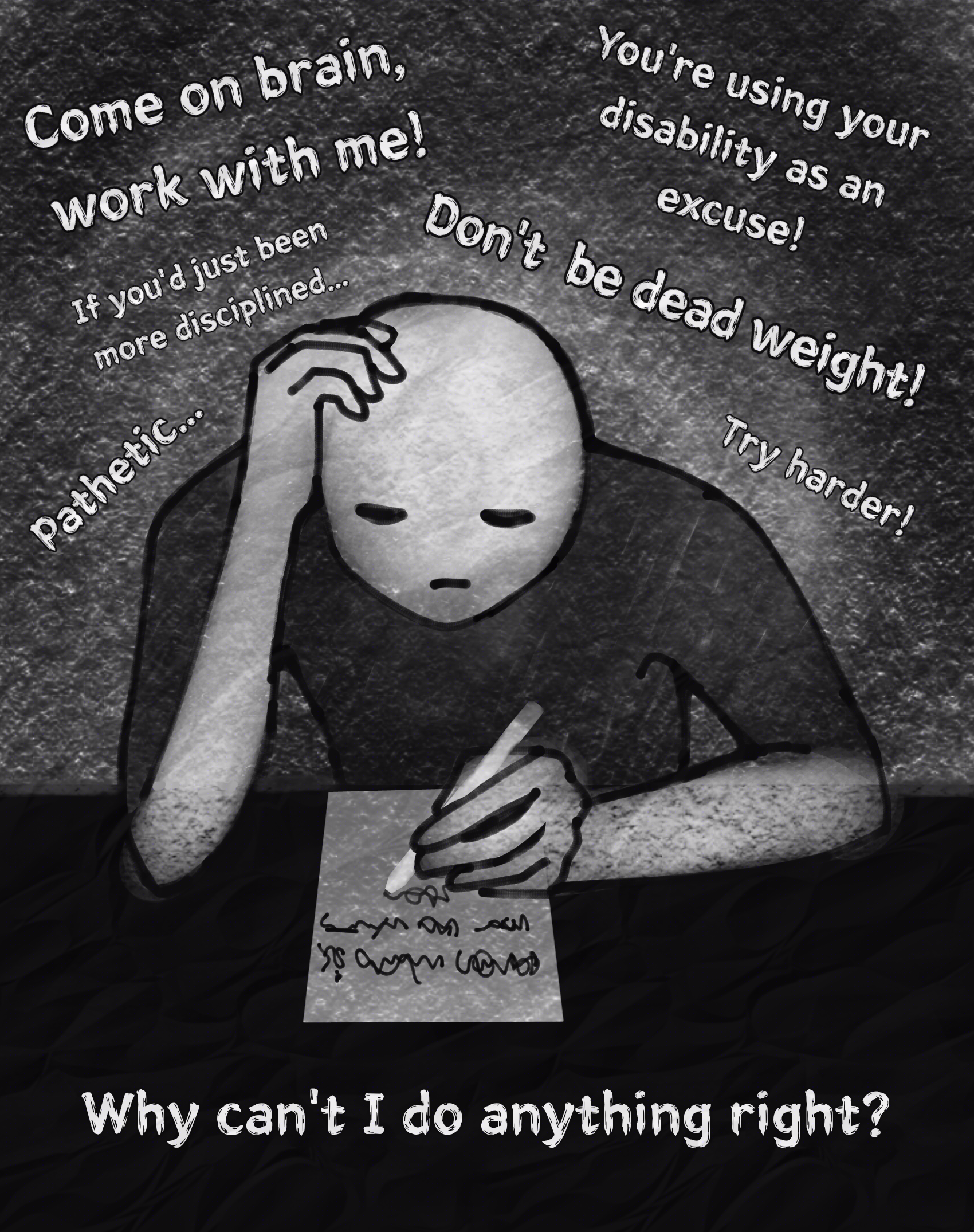
Depiction of internalized ableism from a neurodivergent person (someone with mental or neurodevelopmental conditions)

Internalized ableism is a phenomenon where disabled individuals absorb and enact negative beliefs and prejudiced values about disability that are prevalent in society. Internalized ableism is a form of discrimination against oneself and others with disabilities, rooted in the view that disability is a source of shame, should be concealed, or warrants refusal of support or accessibility.

This internal conflict can stem from continuous exposure to negative social attitudes and a lack of adequate support for disabled people's needs, which contributes to a cycle of rejecting their identity to align with ableist "norms."

Ableism encompasses more than just ignorance around disability leading to negative attitudes towards disabled people. It can also include unrealistic ideals of perfection and ingrained beliefs about bodies, promoting the idea that disability is inherently negative or unwanted.

== History ==
This concept of internalized ableism has historical roots in societal structures that prioritize able-bodied norms and often marginalize or stigmatize those who do not conform. As societal awareness of disability rights has grown with the rise of the disability rights movement in the 1970s, there has been increased recognition of internalized ableism as a significant barrier to the well-being and self-esteem of individuals with disabilities. Research into internalized ableism has been informed by broader theories in psychology and social justice, which emphasize the internalization of societal values by marginalized groups.

== Origins ==
Internalized ableism begins early in life, with societal perceptions often framing having a disabled child as a tragedy. In a study, participants reported encounters where doctors emphasized impairments over potential, contributing to feelings of vulnerability and exclusion. Despite parental efforts to counter stereotypes, inadequate expectations persisted, hindering the development of disabled children. Intersectional biases compounded these experiences, with factors such as gender and social status exacerbating feelings of otherness. The pervasive tragedy discourse continued to shape participants' sense of self throughout adolescence and adulthood, with some explicitly identifying internalized ableism as a significant barrier to their well-being.

== Frameworks ==
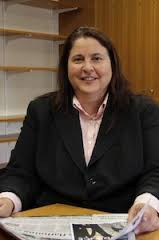
Fiona Kumari Campbell, Disability Studies Researcher and Theorist

Fiona K. Campbell outlines two components of internalized ableism: distancing oneself from the disabled community and the emulation of ableist norms. These "tactics of dispersal" can hinder the formation of a shared identity among disabled individuals, weakening what otherwise could provide a sense of unity, and intensifying feelings of isolation. Emulating ableist norms, or "passing," often serves as a survival mechanism for people with disabilities, but can lead to a denial of one's true identity and reinforce the internalization of ableist attitudes. Campbell's work emphasizes the harm that can emerge when a minority group is forced to adopt an identity that does not resonate with them or their internal values. Another author, Sara Ahmed, echoes Campbell's sentiments, writing that anyone who does not fit within a societal norm, whether due to race, disability, or gender, they are forced to settle within the current culture or defend themselves against criticism by adopting characteristics that are deemed more "normal."

== A form of oppression ==
Internalized ableism is a form of internalized oppression. Internalized ableism arises in response to external oppression, where individuals may develop negative feelings towards themselves and others in their group, often attributing blame to themselves. Traditionally, internalized oppression is framed as a static, psychological issue rather than a dynamic issue that is derived from systemic consequences of generations of marginalization. Internalized oppression occurs when individuals in marginalized groups undervalue themselves, perpetuating this mindset through generations and socialization. Internalized oppression in turn leads to normalized exclusion, which is the acceptance or normalization of practices, policies, or behaviors that systematically exclude or marginalize certain individuals or groups within a society. Although internalized oppression is not always conscious, it can deeply affect how people see themselves and others within their group. This can lead to internal conflicts within the group and the perpetuation of microaggressions, which are subtle forms of discrimination.

== Examples ==
Internalized ableism manifests in various ways among disabled individuals, significantly impacting their mental and social well-being. Disabled individuals may subconsciously adopt ableist norms that devalue their disabilities and themselves, leading to self-devaluation where they view themselves and others with disabilities negatively. Social withdrawal is another manifestation, where individuals may isolate themselves from society due to feelings of inadequacy or fear of discrimination, thereby reducing their interactions and support networks crucial for their well-being. Additionally, some individuals may overcompensate by pushing themselves to overcome or hide their disabilities, which can lead to exhaustion, burnout, and physical harm. There is also often a rejection of disability identity, where individuals avoid associating with other disabled people and distance themselves from their disability identity to not be identified with disability.

== Impact ==
=== Health ===
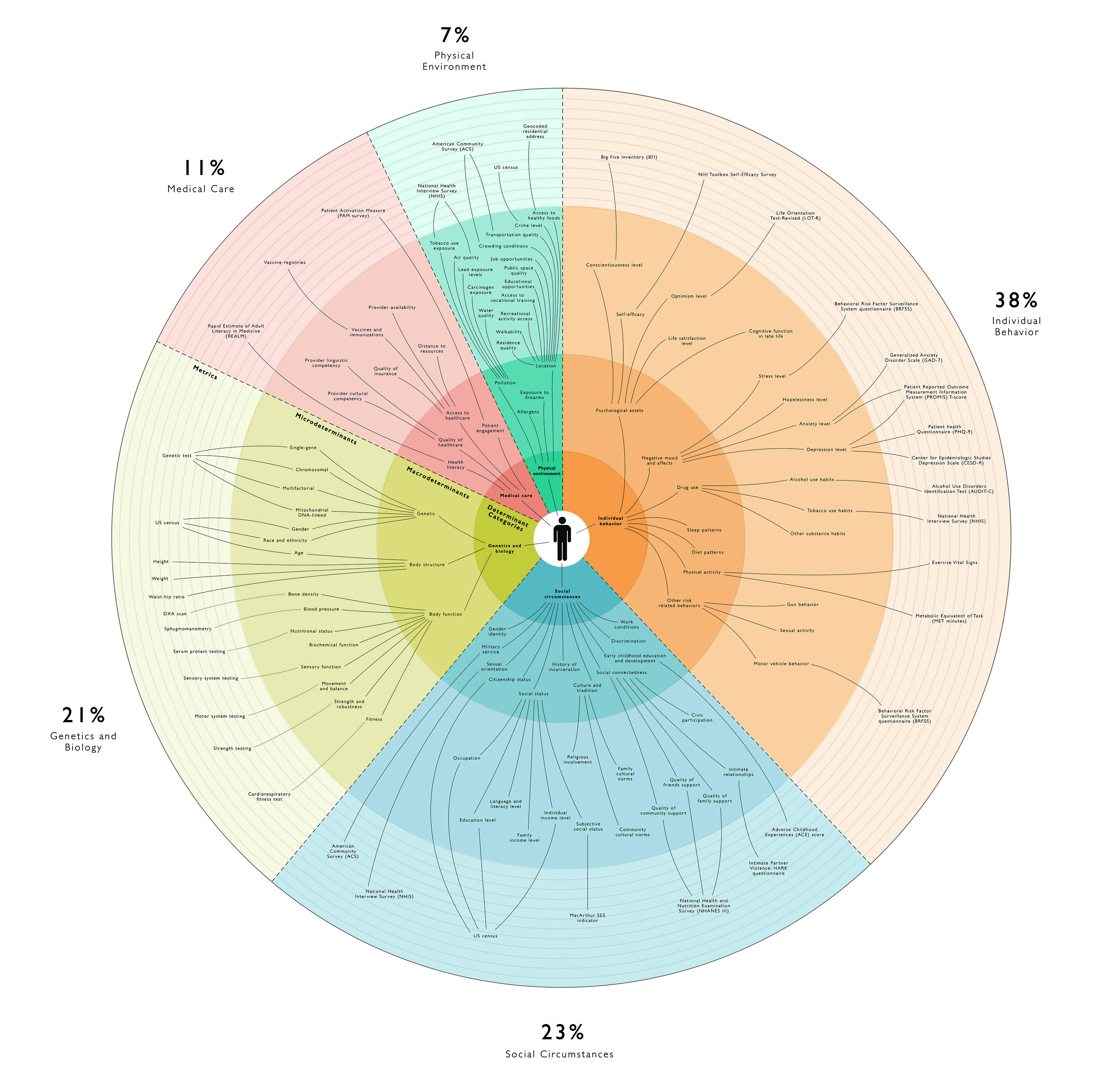
Social Determinants of Health

Internalized ableism can have effects on individuals' mental and physical health, leading to self-blame, low self-esteem, anxiety, depression, and social isolation. Research has shown that internalized stigma in mental illness is linked to lower levels of hope, self-esteem, and social support, and higher symptom severity. Research has found that disabled individuals similarly face oppression in counseling, experiencing biases, stereotyping, and a lack of understanding from counselors, all of which hinder their self-perception. Disabled people may feel pressure to be independent or to conform to societal standards of "normalcy," exacerbating the stigma and challenges they face. The medical establishment's pathologization of disability further entrenches these issues, with the pathology paradigm reinforcing the notion that disabled individuals must aspire to able-bodied standards. Social determinants of health and power dynamics further shape the experiences and identities of disabled young people, as external shame is reinforced and internalized.

Additionally, shame is a significant aspect of internalized ableism, which affects the health and well-being of individuals with disabilities. Shame can stem from feelings of alienation and defeat, influencing behavior and interactions with the world. Shame is closely associated with anxiety and depressive symptoms, triggered by perceptions of inferior treatment or threats to identity integrity. "Core shame identity," characterized by a pervasive fear of exposure as deficient and flawed, perpetuates feelings of unworthiness and disconnection. This internalization can exacerbate depression and social withdrawal. Peer acceptance, open sharing of feelings, and nurturing relationships can alleviate shame, foster emotional well-being and empower those affected. Strategies to overcome shame associated with disabilities include participation in peer support groups, seeking therapy, engaging in education and advocacy, practicing self-care, learning assertiveness skills, fostering supportive relationships, and seeking peer mentorship.

=== Social ===
The emphasis dominant culture places on ability and "normalcy" contributes internalized ableism. It establishes unrealistic standards that affect both disabled and able-bodied individuals. Disabled individuals who require care or accommodations are often marginalized. Examples of resisting internalized ableism include embracing one's disability identity, challenging stereotypes through activism and education, advocating for accessibility and accommodations, participating in supportive communities, and promoting dialogue about ableist language and behavior. This resistance involves both individual actions, such as self-care and self-advocacy, as well as collective efforts to inclusion for disabled individuals. This can also happen on an institutional level where organizations can systematically address internalized ableism by promoting accessibility in public spaces, implementing inclusive hiring practices, and supporting legislation that protects the rights of disabled individuals.

== Dynamics ==
"Affective solidarity" engages the dissonance between one's self-perception and societal judgments. Solidarity within marginalized communities, is a potent force in challenging internalized oppression. The term "disability justice," originating from the Disability Justice Collective, emphasizes this intersectional framework prioritizing the needs of marginalized groups within the disability rights movement. This approach shows the resilience care webs and solidarity can foster among disabled and sick individuals. Both individual empowerment and systemic change are important to combat internalized ableism.

Resistance to internalized ableism relies on access to safer spaces, characterized by solidarity and support. These spaces, often fluid in nature, are deemed "safer" rather than "safe," as they can become unsafe due to access issues, entrenched ableism, micro-aggressions, or violence. In a study, participants expressed the relief of letting go of their defensive walls on rare occasions, highlighting the vigilance required to navigate ableist encounters.

Family support can play a role in resisting internalized ableism, but not all families play a support role. Supportive environments can manifest in many areas of life, extending beyond the concept of a nuclear family. This is exemplified by positive experiences in other communities for disabled individuals. Access to spaces and groups where disabled individuals feel welcomed, understood, and supported is necessary to fostering solidarity and resist internalized ableism.

== Criticism and controversies ==
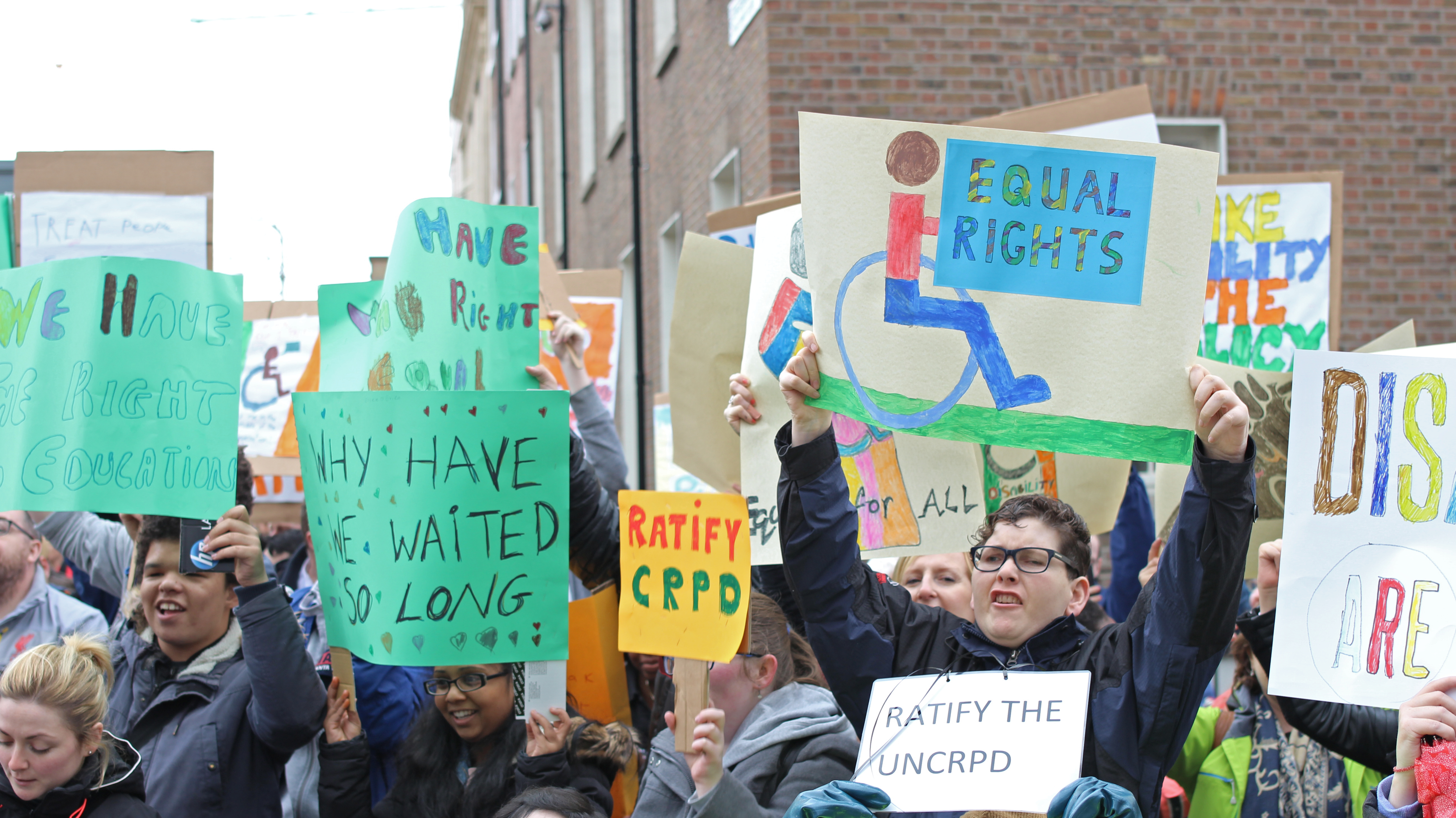
2017 protest to ratify the CRPD

Some critics question the oversimplification of internalized ableism's relationship between individual experiences and societal structures. The idea that internalized ableism exclusively leads to negative feelings and beliefs may dismiss external factors like discrimination and systemic barriers.

There is also a concern whether internalized ableism adequately represents the diversity of disabled experiences and cultural perspectives. There is criticism about the effectiveness of addressing internalized ableism through individual-focused approaches. They suggest targeting systemic inequalities and promoting social inclusion rather than only focusing on changing individual attitudes.

Another concern is that interventions may inadvertently reinforce stereotypes and stigmatize certain disability experiences. They worry about unintended consequences like potential victim-blaming and dismissing intersections between disability and other forms of oppression like racism or sexism.

== See also ==
- Epistemic injustice
- Anosognosia
