= Mongrel complex =

Inferiority complex among Brazilians regarding their nation

"Mongrel complex", or alternatively "mutt complex" (Portuguese: complexo de vira-lata, lit. 'street dog complex, mutt complex, stray dog complex'), is an expression that refers to a feeling of "collective inferiority complex" reportedly felt by many Brazilians when comparing Brazil and its culture to other parts of the world.

== Background ==
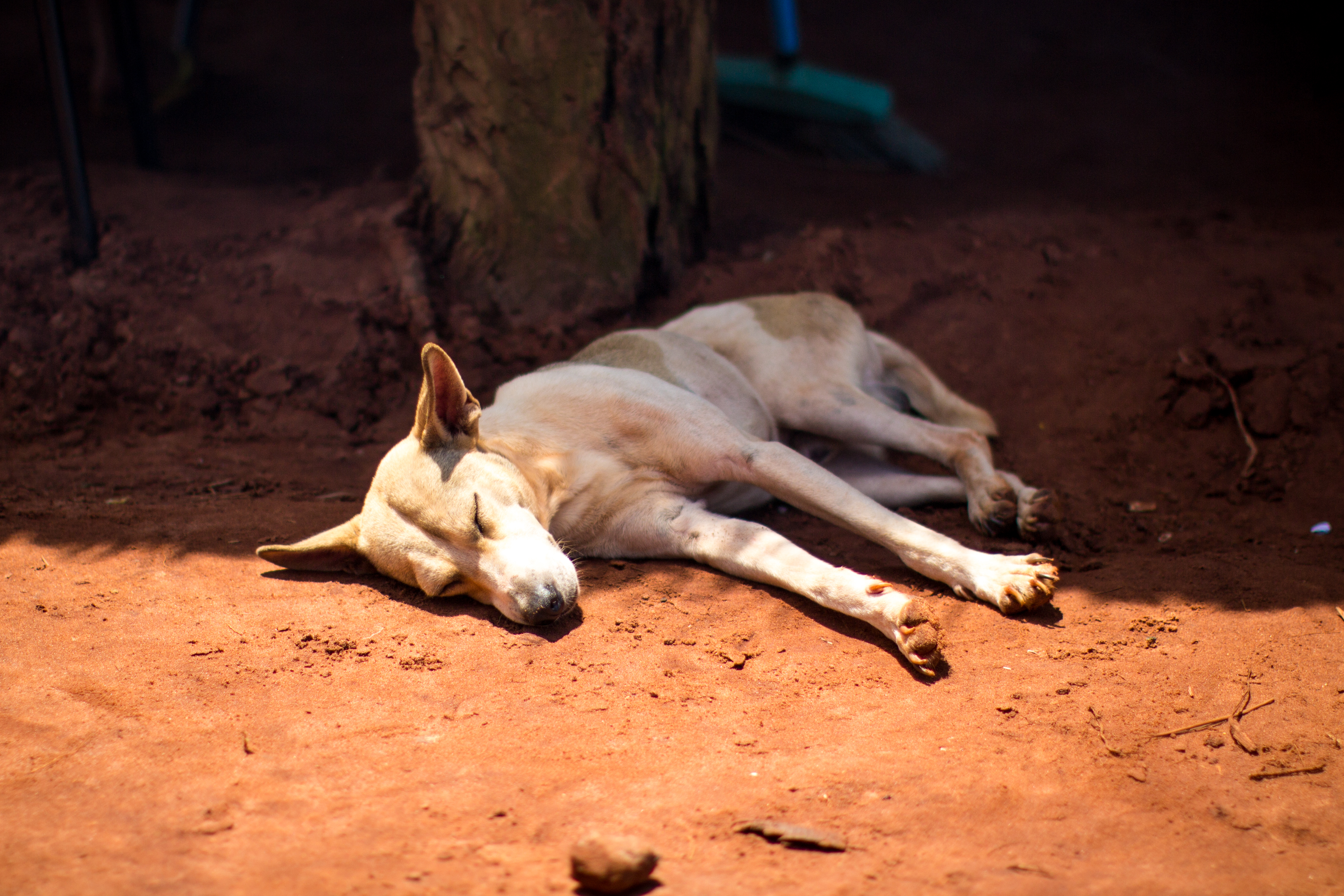
A street mutt in Brazil

The term was originally coined by novelist and writer Nelson Rodrigues, initially referring to the trauma suffered by Brazilians in 1950 when the national football team was defeated by Uruguay's national team in the final match of the 1950 World Cup, which was held at the Maracanã in Rio de Janeiro. The estimated 200,000 spectators at the stadium that day were stunned into an eerie silence after the match concluded. Brazil would recover, at least when it comes to football, in 1958, winning the World Cup for the first of five times.

For Rodrigues, the phenomenon was not exclusively related to sport. According to him:

By "Mongrel Complex" I mean the inferiority in which Brazilians place themselves, voluntarily, when they compare themselves to the rest of the world. Brazilians are the backward Narcissus, who spits in his own image. Here is the truth: we cannot find any personal or historical pretexts for self-esteem.

— Nelson Rodrigues

The expression "mongrel complex" was cited in 2004 by American journalist Larry Rohter. In an article for The New York Times about the Brazilian nuclear program, he wrote:

Writing in the 1950s, the playwright Nelson Rodrigues saw his countrymen as afflicted with a sense of inferiority, and he coined a phrase that Brazilians now use to describe it: "the mongrel complex". Brazil has always aspired to be taken seriously as a world power by the heavyweights, and so it pains Brazilians that world leaders could confuse their country with Bolivia, as Ronald Reagan once did, or dismiss a nation so large – it has 180 million people – as "not a serious country", as Charles de Gaulle did.

— Larry Rohter

== Origins ==
In the 1920s and 1930, many currents of thought clashed concerning the origin of the supposed inferiority. Some, such as Nina Rodrigues, Oliveira Viana, and Monteiro Lobato proclaimed that miscegenation was the root of all evils and that the white race was superior to others.

Others, such as Roquette-Pinto, claimed that the inferiority was a matter of ignorance, rather than miscegenation.

In 1903, Lobato reveals himself to be profoundly pessimistic about the potential of the Brazilian people, by him thus defined:

Brazil, son of inferior parents – destitute of these strongest characters that imprint an unmistakable stamp in certain individuals, such as it happens to the German, the English, grew up sadly – resulting in a worthless kind, incapable of continuing to self develop without the vivifying assistance of the blood of some original race.

Aside from the mixed origin, Brazilians supposedly would suffer from the fact they live in the tropics, where the "hot and humid climate would predispose inhabitants to sloth and lust" (another thesis that was held dear at the time, geographical determinism, alleged that the true civilizations can only develop in temperate climates).

Nevertheless, when Lobato published Urupes in 1918, portraying "Jeca Tatu", the Brazilian elite was starting to favor another explanation of the "backwardness" of the country. With the publication of a series of public health studies ordered by Oswaldo Cruz, then-current poor sanitary conditions at the countryside take place as the main cause of the "lack of vigor" and the "indolence" of the Brazilians. Sanitarism becomes the trend and Lobato himself engages in the effort of converting Brazil into a "big hospital", in the words of physician Miguel Pereira. This effort peaks in 1924, when Lobato publishes "a história do Jecatatuzinho" ("the story of little Jeca Tatu"), used as an advert for Biotônico Fontoura, a traditional nutritional supplement. In the story, after being healed "by science", Jeca Tatu, the titular character, becomes a model citizen and entrepreneur, capable even of surpassing the production of his prosperous neighbor – an Italian immigrant.

=== Analysis by Vicente Palermo ===
In La alegría y la pasión: Relatos brasileños y argentinos en perspectiva comparado (2015), Argentine political scientist and essayist Vicente Palermo notes an ambiguity between the Brazilian people's inferiority complex and the optimistic vision of the rulers and wealthier classes. Citing the sociologist Florestan Fernandes in his analysis, the essayist affirms that the inferiority complex is fading, as a result of social plurality and the gradual decrease in the veiled prejudice that has always existed in Brazilian society. He also cites the anthropologist and writer Darcy Ribeiro, who attributed to Brazilian society "a cultural syncretism that values mixed-race origin". Palermo also cites the journalist and filmmaker Arnaldo Jabor.

== Criticism ==
However, many Brazilian critics and writers have opposed this concept, arguing that the idea of a "complex" often ignores the nuances of cultural and artistic appreciation. Among these critics are names such as Adélia Prado, Augusto de Campos and Hilda Hilst. Each, in their own way, presented arguments that challenge Nelson Rodrigues' view.

== See also ==
- Cultural cringe
- Culture of Brazil
- Malinchism (Another nationalist derogatory term)
- Multiculturalism
- Nationalism
- Chauvinism
