= Self-hatred =

Hatred of oneself

Self-hatred is a state of personal self-loathing or low self-esteem.

== In psychology and psychiatry ==
The term "self-hatred" is used infrequently by psychologists and psychiatrists, who would usually describe people who hate themselves as "people with low self-esteem". Self-hatred, self-guilt, and shame are important factors in some or many mental disorders, especially disorders that involve a perceived defect of oneself (e.g. body dysmorphic disorder). Self-hatred is also a symptom of many personality disorders, including borderline personality disorder (BPD), as well as mood disorders like depression. It can also be linked to guilt for someone's own actions that they view as wrongful, e.g., survivor guilt.

== In social groups ==
Self-hatred among members of specific ethnic, gender, or religious groups has been understood as a result of the internalization of negative attitudes toward those groups within dominant cultures.

=== Ethnic groups ===
In social justice studies, internalized racism is a form of internalized oppression, defined by sociologist Karen D. Pyke as the "internalization of racial oppression by the racially subordinated." In her study The Psychology of Racism, Robin Nicole Johnson emphasizes that internalized racism involves both "conscious and unconscious acceptance of a racial hierarchy in which a presumed superior race are consistently ranked above other races. These definitions encompass a wide range of instances, including, but not limited to, belief in negative stereotypes, adaptations to cultural standards, and thinking that supports the status quo (i.e. denying that racism exists).

=== Women ===
Internalized sexism is a form of sexist behavior and attitudes enacted by women toward themselves or other women and girls. It is a form of internalized oppression, which "consists of oppressive practices that continue to make the rounds even when members of the oppressor group are not present." Internalized sexism can have negative effects on women and girls, including problems with mental health and body image. Modes of internalization of sexism include early childhood inculturation and consumption of media, especially of celebrity and entertainment news.

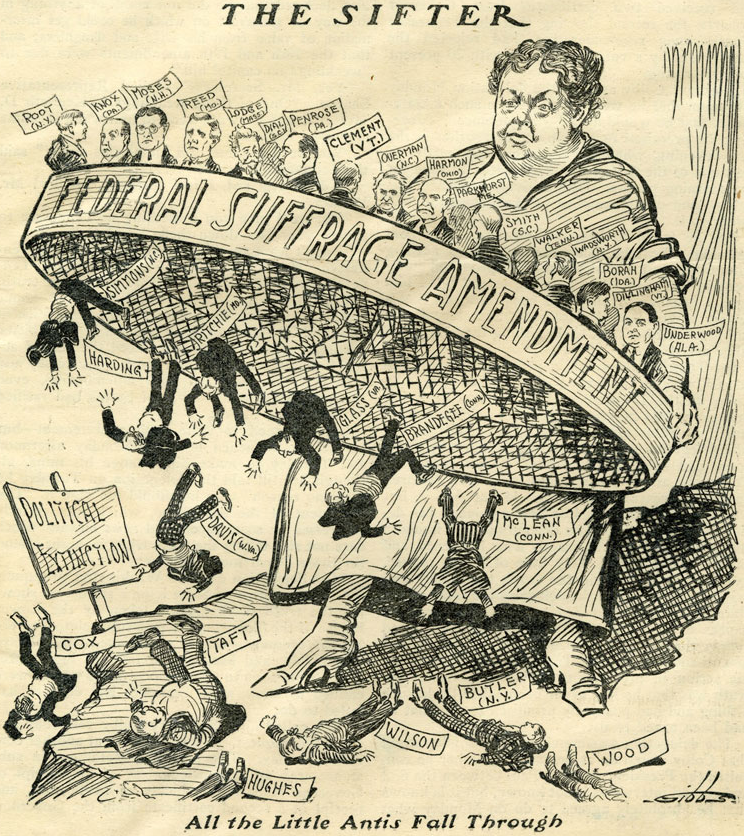
Cartoon published by Woman Patriot Corporation, an American women's organization against women's suffrage

=== Jews ===
Theodor Lessing, in his book, Jewish Self-Hatred (1930), identified this as a pathology, "a manifestation of an over identification with the dominant culture and internalization of its prejudices." Some scholars have suggested that mental illness among Jewish people may be linked to feelings of inferiority and self-hatred resulting from persecution and social conditions.

The term has been used to label American Jews accused of hiding their identity "by converting or intermarrying and raising their children in another faith" to overcome sociopolitical barriers due to antisemitism in the United States.

=== LGBTQ+ individuals ===
Internalized homophobia refers to negative stereotypes, beliefs, stigma, and prejudice about homosexuality and LGBTQ people that a person with same-sex attraction turns inward on themselves, whether or not they identify as LGBTQ. This is often linked with personal identity and cultural and religious beliefs. These aspects can produce feelings of guilt, self rejection, and shame. The people that experience internalized homophobia might try to repress or even deny their identity and try to alter themselves to adhere to heteronormative expectations.

== Related concepts ==
=== Self-deprecation ===
Self-deprecation is the act of belittling, undervaluing, or disparaging oneself, or being excessively modest. It is often used as a form of humor and tension release, but it also simultaneously normalizes self-hatred.

=== Self-harm ===
Self-harm is a psychological phenomenon in which individuals feel compelled to physically injure themselves (for example, cutting, burning or hitting oneself) as an outlet for self-hatred, anxiety, or anger. It is also associated with various psychological disorders.

In some cases, self-harm can lead to accidental death or suicide due to its self-destructive nature. However, it is not a definitive indicator of either the desire to attempt suicide or even suicidal ideation. For this reason, self-harm is sometimes also called non-suicidal self-injury (NSSI). NSSI also has risk factors like experiencing abuse or trauma, age, and sexual orientation. People who experience abuse or trauma may commit NSSI so they can feel like they are in control of a situation. Individuals who are teenagers/young adults are more likely to start committing NSSI. Lastly, people who identify themselves within the LGBTQ+ community may do NSSI because they often experience social rejection.

== See also ==
- Anti-Germans (political current) – Theoretical and political trend in the left and liberals mainly in Germany and Austria
- Anti-Japaneseism – Theory from the New Left of Japan
- Cultural cringe – Feeling of inferiority of one's culture to another
- Mongrel complex – Inferiority complex among Brazilians regarding their nation
- Internalized oppression – Concept in social justice theory
- White guilt – White people's guilt for racist harms
- Internalized ableism – Concept in disability studies
