= Internalized oppression =

Concept in social justice theory

In social justice theory, internalized oppression is the resignation by members of an oppressed group to the methods of an oppressing group and their incorporation of its message against their own best interest. Rosenwasser (2002) defines it as believing, adopting, accepting, and incorporating the negative beliefs provided by the oppressor as the truth.

It occurs as a part of socialization in an oppressive environment. Members of marginalized groups assimilate the oppressive view of their own group and consequently affirm negative self-stereotypes. This harms their psycho-social well-being and self-systems, causing them to produce and reproduce stress-induced, disadvantageous behavioral responses that lead to the development of maladaptive habits. As a result, they cultivate and perpetuate an "assaulted sense of self" by not intentionally and deliberately engaging in active responsibility for their own well-being. Furthermore, the absence of proactive engagement as catalysts for change, such as fostering counterspaces and practicing active citizenship, hinders the overall welfare of the collective in hegemonic societies.

Depending on the form of discrimination, types of internalized oppression include internalized racism, internalized homophobia, internalized sexism, internalized ableism and auto-antisemitism. A related psychological characteristic is "internalized domination". It occurs as part of socialization that privileges oppressing groups. Members of oppressing groups accept their socially superior status as natural, sacrosanct, and faultless, and they believe that the privileges associated with their status are exclusive and truly justified.

== Types ==
Internalized oppression occurs as a result of psychological injury caused by external oppressive events (e.g., harassment and discrimination), and it has a negative impact on individuals' self system (e.g., self-esteem, self-image, self-concept, self-worth, and self-regulation). The trauma of internalized oppression is intensified by repetitive exposure to explicit violence such as segregation and discrimination, as well as implicitly through various forms of oppressive microprocesses and insidious microaggressions (e.g., privation of inclusion and peripheralizing). It may manifest on an individual or group level, and may form as base for in-group conflict and further discrimination that can be hurtful and limiting.

Internalized racism is about fostering a negative attitude towards one's own race, created by the oppressing race, and nurturing a positive attitude towards the oppressor's race (e.g., race traitor). As a result, it leads individuals to experience chronic self-hatred and deny their membership in their own racial group. Over time, it can be an effect of internalized colonialism. As heirs of ingrained assimilation to the oppressor's truth and by nurturing attributional errors, the colonized people gradually accept the oppressor's norm as the norm to follow, often unintentionally and without being aware of it. An example of internalized colonialism on self-perception is the practice of skin whitening (see colorism), which is found in Africa and Asia.

Internalized homophobia, also known as internalized heterosexism, occurs in the LGBT community when individuals adopt a culture's heterosexist attitudes. It has a positive correlation with psychological distress and a negative correlation with self-esteem. Internalized homophobia is strongly associated with guilt and shame (especially among youth) and has been linked to increased anxiety, depression and suicide. Additionally, research suggests that internalized homophobia can shape how individuals navigate their authenticity in personal and professional relationships, often compelling them to develop strategies to manage or conceal aspects of their identity.

In internalized sexism, individuals (generally women) adopt oppressive attitudes towards their gender which are held by their culture. An example is slut-shaming, where women criticize transgressions of accepted codes of sexual conduct on themselves and other women.

Internalized ableism is often a result of relentless pathologization and lack of or inadequate support disabled people face on a daily basis. The fact the medical establishment is a significant factor that causes and contributes to internalized ableism with frameworks such as the pathology paradigm mean that disabled people trying to enact emancipatory change and self-identify are often deemed as "anti-science" by individuals and institutions which subscribe to scientism.

Internalized oppression may also exist among immigrants, and based on the transgenerational trauma, it may affect their descendants as well. When the host community devalues a foreigner's ethnic origin, native language or culture, the immigrant may feel inferior. Prolonged exposure to such devaluation can lead to the well-known inferiority complex among the oppressed. Immigrants who adapt to this environment, according to the psychology of oppression, may adopt the oppressor's guidelines and prohibitions, assimilate their image and social behaviors, and become agents of their own and their community's oppression. This is often characterized by self-hatred, which manifests itself in an exaggerated conformity to dominant norms. To cope, an immigrant may either assimilate and acculturate or develop a Nero complex.

== Causes ==
Internalized oppression "occurs when a person comes to internalize oppressive prejudices and biases about the identity group(s) to which he or she belongs". It occurs when "[s]ocial oppression such as racism, sexism, ableism, classism, heterosexism, gender and religious oppression, and anti-Semitism" are "implanted by and [work] toward the benefit of any dominant group". Internalized oppression "depends on systemically limiting, blocking, and undermining" the "success, innovation, and power" of oppressed individuals or groups. Some individuals will copy and internalize "institutionalized rejection of difference," failing "to examine the distortions which result from ... misnaming [these differences] and their effects on human behavior and expectations."

=== Related theories ===
French philosopher Michel Foucault "has argued that the rise of parliamentary institutions and of new conceptions of political liberty was accompanied by a darker counter-movement, by the emergence of a new and unprecedented discipline directed against the body. More is required of the body now than mere political allegiance or the approbation of the products of its labor: the new discipline invades the body and seeks to regulate its very forces and operations, the economy and efficiency of its movements ... the production of 'docile bodies' requires that an uninterrupted coercion be directed to the very processes of bodily activity, not just their result; this 'micro-physics of power' fragments and partitions the body's time, its space, and its movements".

The 18th-century English philosopher Jeremy Bentham's Panopticon is a theoretical model of Foucault's ideas. Its constant state of surveillance, imposed by an oppressive external force, serves "'to induce in the inmate a state of consciousness and permanent visibility that assures the automatic functioning of power'; each becomes to himself his own jailer".

== Effects ==
"If women are surrounded by people who view them as subordinate, incapable, or lacking control over their actions, women are likely to come to understand themselves in a similar way, even if subconsciously." Internalized oppression fosters the beliefs that the self cannot be autonomous, is unworthy of wielding power, and is little more than an object of sexual gratification (see sexual objectification). "Psychological oppression can be damaging to a person's moral relationship with the self ... Since those who have internalized oppressive prejudices often engage in behavior that further perpetuates these biases, internalized oppression is not only a symptom of an oppressive social climate, but it also represents a mechanism for its continued existence". According to University of Massachusetts Amherst doctoral students Valerie Joseph and Tanya O. Williams, "Deep racial self-negation[,] ... internalized racial hatred [and] internalized oppression ... stymied [their] growth as people and scholars [and] inhibited [their] ability to be…profound, strong, and beautiful ..." Individuals can be made to feel "implicated in a project of compliance with the values and goals" of the dominant society. Internalized oppression may also occur in disabled individuals, who may distance themselves from others with disabilities to avoid associating themselves with those who may be viewed by society as "weak" or "lazy". Nabina Liebow wrote, "People of color who internalize stereotypes regarding criminality and moral deviance ... can ... view themselves as outlaws in the moral community" and may "engage in behavior that further perpetuates these biases ... Fulfilling these stereotypes further pushes someone outside the moral fold and intensifies one's damaged moral identity ... [I]nternalizing stereotypes about criminality and moral deviance can lead to a pervasive feeling of guilt ... Persistent feelings of guilt can result in mental-health setbacks such as depression" and "repeated exposure to guilt and similar feelings has been linked with a range of health challenges such as "dysfunctional coping, abdominal obesity, and glucose intolerance complicit in the development of Type 2 diabetes".

== Manifestations ==
According to Audre Lorde, manifestations of internalized oppression include voluntary isolation. She describes the relationship between older members of an oppressed group and younger members of the same group as "contemptible or suspect or excess." [sic] This generation gap leads to "historical amnesia", with oppressed minorities repeating the learning process and failing to convey knowledge to subsequent generations. Lorde cites oppressed individuals as "encouraged to pluck out some one aspect of [one]self and present this as the meaningful whole, eclipsing or denying the other parts of the self"; they may hesitate to breach the false stereotypes surrounding them or verbalize resistance to violence. The most common manifestation is self-hatred.

Racial manifestations include "multifaceted and extreme psychological, social, and economic self-sabotage"; a tendency to "defer to whites", and feelings of being "not black enough". The self is viewed as a diminished, deviant, criminal and undeserving moral agent. Sandra Bartky identified disturbances in body image, gender expression and power dynamics as manifestations of internalized sexism in women.

== Remedies ==
According to Audre Lorde, "[T]he master's tools will never dismantle the master's house ... My fullest concentration of energy is available to me only when I integrate all the parts of who I am, openly, allowing power from the particular sources of my living to flow back and forth freely through all my different selves, without the restrictions of externally imposed definition". "To root out internalized patterns of oppression" women must "recognize differences among women who are our equals, neither inferior nor superior, and devise ways to use each other's difference to enrich our visions and our joint struggles …to identify and develop new definitions of power and new patterns of relating across difference ... sharpen[ing] self-definition by exposing the self in work and struggle together with those whom we define as different from ourselves, although sharing similar goals".

To understand and overcome internalized oppression, Joseph and Williams developed a workshop to "introduce and discuss issues of socialization, stereotyping, internalized oppression, and domination." This "social justice education model ... encouraged an agent/target model of leadership" in which representatives of the oppressor and oppressed classes joined together to guide "participants in developing a plan of action to address racism." They recommended that fear "left over about discussing race, racism, and internalized racism" be set aside to "talk forthrightly, honestly, reflectively, and thoughtfully about race", and the "need to voice ... hurt, the need to surface realities, the need to shine light on a history that was and continues to be ignored" is greater than the fear of discussing the issues. The internally oppressed must learn how they have been indoctrinated, to "engage in a process of rejecting internalized subordination as an everyday choice".

== See also ==
- Autoplastic adaptation
- Bad faith (existentialism)
- Employee resource group
- False consciousness
- Identification with the aggressor
- Infrahumanisation
- Internalization (psychology)
- Intrusive thought
- Learned helplessness
- Natal alienation
- Passing (racial identity)
- Sensemaking
- Social invisibility
- Social reproduction
- Taijin kyofusho
