= Uncle Tom syndrome =

Theory in multicultural psychology

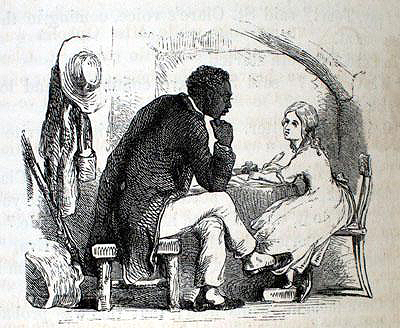
Illustration of Tom and Eva by Hammatt Billings for the 1853 deluxe edition of Uncle Tom's Cabin

Uncle Tom syndrome is a theory in multicultural psychology referring to a coping skill in which individuals use passivity and submissiveness when confronted with a threat, leading to subservient behaviour and appeasement, while concealing their true thoughts and feelings.

== Overview ==
The term "Uncle Tom" comes from the title character of Harriet Beecher Stowe's novel Uncle Tom's Cabin, where an African American slave, Tom, is beaten to death for refusing to betray the whereabouts of two other slaves. In Stowe's novel Uncle Tom is a heroic character, loyal to the slaves in hiding, but the original producers of the stage version of the story "grossly distorted" the character into a man who would sell out his own race to curry favor with white people. This version of Uncle Tom was designed to be more favourable to audiences of the late 1850s, and it is he, not the original, to whom the slur refers.

In the American racial context, "Uncle Tom" is a pejorative term for African Americans who give up or hide their ethnic outlook, traits, and practices, in order to be accepted into the mainstream.

In race studies literature, Uncle Tom syndrome refers to African Americans who, as a necessary survival technique, opt to appear docile, non-assertive, and happy-go-lucky. Especially during slavery, African Americans used passivity and servility for the avoidance of retaliation and for self-preservation.

In a broader context, the term may refer to a minority's strategy of coping with oppression from socially, culturally, or economically dominant groups involving suppression of aggressive feelings and even identification with the oppressor, leading to forced assimilation/acculturation of the cultural minority.

== See also ==
- Acting white
- Ad hominem
- Anti-Semite and Jew
- Anti-Germanism
- Anti-Japaneseism
- Association of German National Jews
- Black Legend of the Spanish Inquisition
- Boba liberal
- Colonial mentality
- Crypto-Judaism
- Crypto-Christianity
- Crypto-Islam
- Culchie
- Cultural cringe
- Dic Siôn Dafydd
- Gender-critical feminism
- Hanjian
- House slave
- Internalized oppression
  - Internalized ableism
  - Internalized racism
  - Internalized sexism
  - Internalized homophobia
- Jackeen
- Mankurt
- No true Scotsman
- Passing (sociology)
- Patrol 36
- Race traitor
- Shoneen
- Self-hating Jew
- Sycophancy
- Takfir
- The Believer
- Uncle Ruckus
- White guilt
- West Brit
