= Chunghee Sarah Soh =

Korean-American professor of Anthropology

- Education: Sogang University; University of Hawaiʻi
- Occupation: Sociocultural anthropologist
- Employer: San Francisco State University

Korean name
- Hangul: 소정희
- Hanja: 蘇貞姫
- RR: So Jeonghui
- MR: So Chŏnghŭi

Chunghee Sarah Soh or Sarah Soh is an American professor of Anthropology at San Francisco State University. She is a sociocultural anthropologist who specializes in issues of women, gender, sexuality.

Her book The Comfort Women: Sexual Violence and Postcolonial Memory in Korea and Japan delivers new insight into the nature of the comfort women issue.

== Careers ==
She graduated from Sogang University in Seoul and earned her master's degree and then Ph.D. from the University of Hawaii in 1987. She taught cultural anthropology at universities in Hawaii in 1990, Arizona from 1990 to 1991 and Texas from 1991 to 1994. She joined San Francisco State University in 1994.

== Comfort women ==
Soh has said "there can be no denial of the tragic victimization of forcibly recruited women who suffered slavery-like conditions." According to Soh, "it was Japan's colonialism that undoubtedly facilitated the large-scale victimization of tens of thousands of Korean women".

She wrote a book titled The Comfort Women: Sexual Violence and Postcolonial Memory in Korea and Japan. In the book, she provocatively disputes the simplistic view that comfort women were victims of a war crime were solely the fault of Imperial Japan. Instead, she argues that both the Japanese military and the Korean patriarchy are at fault. She asserts that because of the patriarchy that dominated Korea at the time, homes were unstable and thus young girls were more likely to leave, a situation which allowed comfort station owners to recruit them into brothels. Additionally, she argues South Korean nationalist politics and the international women's human rights movement have contributed to the incomplete view of the tragedy that still dominates today.

== Works ==
- Soh, Sarah (2008). The Comfort Women: Sexual Violence and Postcolonial Memory in Korea and Japan. University of Chicago Press. ISBN 978-0226767772.
- Soh, Chung-Hee (1993). Women in Korean Politics. Westview Press. ISBN 0813320410.
- Soh, Chung-Hee (1991). The Chosen Women in Korean Politics: An Anthropological Study. Praeger. ISBN 027593876X.

== See also ==
- An Byeong-jik
- Lee Young-hoon
- Park Yu-ha
- Diary of a Japanese military brothel manager
