= The Comfort Women =

2008 history book by Chunghee Sarah Soh

The Comfort Women: Sexual Violence and Postcolonial Memory in Korea and Japan
- Author: Chunghee Sarah Soh
- Language: English
- Published: 2008
- Publisher: University of Chicago Press
- Publication place: The United States
- Pages: 384

The Comfort Women: Sexual Violence and Postcolonial Memory in Korea and Japan was written by Professor Chunghee Sarah Soh (소정희 蘇貞姫) of San Francisco State University. The book delves deeper into the World War II comfort women issue.

== Background ==
Soh was born in South Korea. She graduated from Sogang University in Seoul and earned her master's degree and then Ph.D from the University of Hawaii in 1987. She is a sociocultural anthropologist who specializes in issues of women, gender, sexuality.

In 1996, Soh published an essay titled "The Korean 'Comfort Women': Movement for Redress", which appeared in Asian Survey. Soh wrote about how the sexist Korean patriarchal culture was a critical underlying factor in the criminal collaboration by Koreans in the Japanese comfort women program. This combined with the sense of shame about sex work to prevent the comfort women program from being investigated after the war. In the 1960s and later, the comfort women issue was not considered important by the government of South Korea because of the elitist tendency to ignore the plight of the poor; most of the coerced Koreans were from poor families.

== Summary ==
In this book Soh criticizes the Korean Council for the Women Drafted for Military Sexual Slavery, also known as Chong Dae Hyup, a left-wing activist group, arguing that it has exaggerated the comfort women story, creating a false narrative of victimization. She asserts that Chong Dae Hyup's narrative of the Japanese military coercively taking young Korean women away from "loving parents" is baseless, and she accuses the activist group of strategic misrepresentations that have prevented deeper understanding of the comfort women issue. She insists that it is incorrect to portray the comfort women as sex slaves and the system as a war crime. In her view, the burden is on Korean society to repudiate victimization, admit its complicity and accept that the comfort women system was not criminal. However, she concedes that current Korean nationalism is so strong that it is highly unlikely Korean society will come to that realization anytime soon

In wars soldiers sometimes commit rapes. To prevent this from occurring, the Japanese military asked businessmen to recruit prostitutes and operate brothels. The Japanese military sent notices to brothel operators ordering them to only recruit willing prostitutes and not to recruit women against their will. The Japanese operators followed the order and only recruited willing women. But the Korean operators recruited both willing and unwilling women. If Korean brothel operators had followed the Japanese military's order, there would not have been any comfort women issue.

When Japan offered compensation through Asian Women's Fund in 1995, Soh asserts that Chong Dae Hyup threatened Korean women not to accept Japan's apology and compensation so that it could continue its anti-Japanese propaganda campaign. Soh describes how 61 former Korean comfort women defied this threat and accepted compensation. Those 61 women were vilified as traitors. Chong Dae Hyup published their names and addresses in newspapers as dirty prostitutes, so they had to live the rest of their lives in disgrace.

Professor Soh also argues that the Korean narrative is misleading as it deliberately mixes the comfort women with the volunteer corps (Chong Sin Dae 정신대), a separate system of mobilizing women's labor during World War II. Furthermore, the Koreans turn their eyes away from their own collaboration. She asserts that the Korean comfort station operators recruited Korean comfort women, some of whom were sold to the operators by indebted parents. But after the war Korean society stigmatized these women, exacerbating their tragedy.

== Reviews ==
In The Japan Times, the book was reviewed by Jeff Kingston, a history professor at Temple University, Japan Campus. Kingston noted how Soh defines the comfort women system as arising "from the nexus of patriarchy, colonialism, capitalism and militarism, placing it in an ongoing continuum of women’s subjugation and exploitation." Kingston said that Soh targets the Korean Council for its single "canonized story" of comfort women, a story of "sweeping generalizations", rather than a more complex assessment. Soh criticizes the Korean Council for traumatizing those comfort women who accepted monetary compensation from the Japan-based Asian Women's Fund. Kingston describes how the book places responsibility on Korean society for the Korean comfort women problem, even though Soh admits that the Japanese government established and managed the program. Kingston observes that Soh is much more critical of liberal Korean redress activists than she is of conservative Japanese nationalist apologists who can use the book's arguments for their own purposes.

Mark E. Caprio, a professor of history at Rikkyo University in Tokyo, wrote that Soh's book emphasizes the complexity of the comfort women issue. The book describes how there are vastly different experiences of comfort women depending on how they were recruited and where they were stationed. Soh works toward a more comprehensive definition of comfort women, rather than limiting the definition to a single characterization. Caprio criticizes Soh for opening the door to Japanese nationalists who make "irresponsible claims" to minimize the comfort women issue. Caprio says that Soh's book supports some of the arguments used by nationalists, and that it does not spend enough effort on refutation of the nationalist position.

Yuma Totani, a history professor at University of Hawaii at Manoa, reviewed the book in The American Historical Review. Totani notes that, in her "diverse and textured" research on the comfort women issue, Soh describes how "Korean nationalist advocacy" has served to damp discussion of the "masculinist sex culture" in Korea, a culture that contributed to the exploitation of comfort women. Soh argues for a deep look into the societal structures that allow violence against women. Totani observes that Soh's book examines four competing ideologies which are critical to the understanding of the modern comfort women issue. These ideologies are the "fascistic paternalism" of wartime Japan, the continuing "masculinist sexism" of Japan and Korea, the "feminist humanitarianism" movement which is split over the redress issue, and "ethnic nationalism" which turns a blind eye to historical accuracy in favor of emotional devotion to one's country. Totani writes that the book's greatest strength is its description of ethnic nationalism which is a particular problem in South Korea because the comfort women issue is being used by South Korean nationalists as a wedge issue. Soh writes that South Korean nationalists have constructed a master narrative of the comfort women issue, one that is simplistic and homogenizing, showing Korea as the victim. Soh's research reveals a much wider narrative, providing instead a holistic view of the issue, with more nuance and variation, especially factoring in the acceptance in Korea of institutionalized gender violence.

== See also ==
- An Byeong-jik
- Lee Young-hoon
- Anti-Japan Tribalism
