= Race traitor =

Pejorative racial term

Race traitor is a phrase that describes someone who is perceived to have betrayed their own race, primarily by other members of their race or ethnic group. People can be accused of betraying their race for many socio-political reasons, including miscegenation, cultural assimilation, internalized racism, supporting the interests of other racial groups, and neglecting the interests and welfare of their own racial group. Among racial minorities, the term "race traitor" is sometimes used to describe someone in a position of power that abandons or minimizes their racial identity in order to escape racial discrimination. Although derogatory, the phrase has been reclaimed by some left-wing activists seeking to abolish the concept of whiteness, notably including the political journal of the same name.

== African Americans ==
Perceptions and accusations of racial betrayal among African Americans largely operate within the bounds of the hierarchical identities constructed during the period of American chattel slavery. Those perceived to be race traitors are dubbed coons, house negros, mammies, Uncle Toms, and Aunt Jemimas. Black conservatives are the main targets of these assertions, with politicians such as Clarence Thomas and Tim Scott accused of being race traitors working for anti-black causes against their own interests. Additionally, African Americans perceived to "act white" or going incognegro are subject to criticism and accusations of betraying their race.

Conservative black nationalist movements such as Hoteps often emphasize strict adherence to traditional religious and cultural aspects of black identity, including strong family structures and patriarchal gender roles. Any perceived deviance from these norms can be seen as a betrayal. When asked about the assassination of Malcolm X after his departure from the Nation of Islam, minister Louis Farrakhan stated:

Was Malcolm your traitor or ours? And if we dealt with him like a nation deals with a traitor, what the hell business is it of yours? A nation has to be able to deal with traitors and cutthroats and turncoats.

== Jews ==
Though each distinct and with cultural nuance, Jewish culture has several religious and cultural terms to describe someone seen as a race traitor. The broadest term is self hating Jew, used to describe a Jew who holds antisemitic or anti-Zionist sentiments. The Yiddish term a shande far de goyim ("a shame in front of the goyim") and the more serious Hebrew term chillul Hashem ("a desecration of the name [of God]") are both sayings used to indicate that a Jew has behaved shamefully in front of non-Jews, and possibly fuelled antisemitic stereotypes doing so. Kapo, a slang term for a Jewish prisoner of Nazi concentration camps who was allowed certain privileges in exchange for supervising slave labor, has been described as "the worst insult a Jew can give another Jew", and "accuses Jews today of actively betraying their fellow Jews by working for their oppressors."

In addition to bolstering antisemitism, Jews have been accused as betraying their community by propagating right-wing politics, desecrating religious law, and assimilating into non-Jewish culture. A Jew who marries a non-Jew or converts out of Judaism is sometimes mourned as dead, and intermarriage has been described by an Israeli minister as a "second Holocaust". Because of the history of Christian antisemitism, there is often a greater stigma surrounding Jews who choose to convert to Christianity, while other conversions or a lack of religious affiliation are not considered taboo. Professor Stuart Charmé wrote that "[T]o embrace the radioactive core of goyishness—Jesus—violates the final taboo of Jewishness.[...] Belief in Jesus as messiah is not simply a heretical Jewish belief, as it may have been in the first century, it has become the equivalent to an act of ethno-cultural suicide."

== White people ==
Historically, people have been dubbed white traitors for opposing slavery, supporting civil rights movements, or having any association with blackness. Racial hygienists, especially white supremacist ones, often accuse white people in interracial relationships of being race traitors, prominently including Prince Harry and JD Vance.

The term has been used by the Ku Klux Klan to describe white political opponents. It has also been reclaimed by activists, including Noel Ignatiev, John H. Garvey, and Mab Segrest.

== See also ==
- Anti-Germans (political current)
- Anti-Japaneseism
- Banana, coconut, and Twinkie
- Boba liberal
- Chinilpa
- Class traitor
- Coconut (slur)
- Cuckservative
- Cultural cringe
- Hanjian
- Internalized oppression
- Internalized racism
- Malinchista
- Rassenschande
- Sarong party girl
- Self-hating Jew
- Shoneenism
- Treason
- Tochak Waegu
- Uncle Tom syndrome
- West Brit
- White nigger
- Wigger
