= Uncle Tom =

Title character of Uncle Tom's Cabin

- Uncle Tom's Cabin character
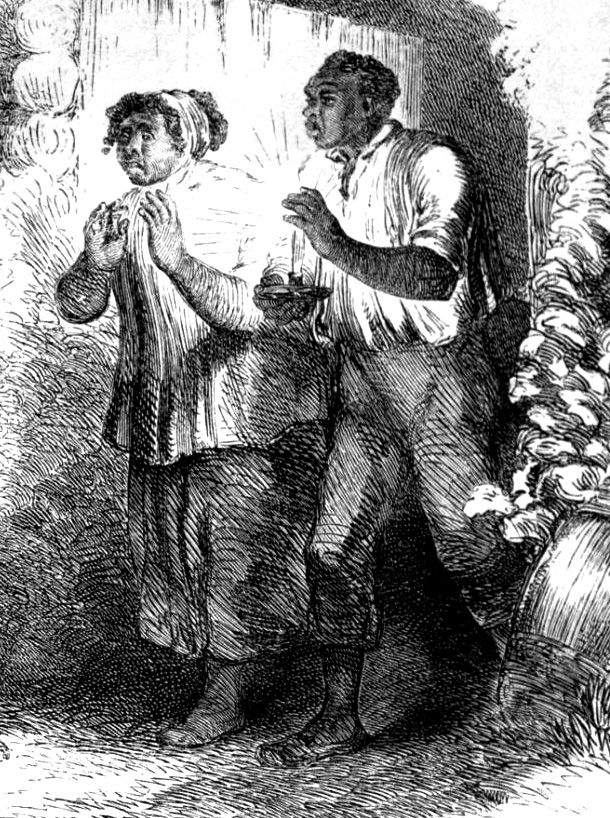
- Detail of an illustration from the first book edition of Uncle Tom's Cabin, depicting Uncle Tom as a young African-American man
- Created by: Harriet Beecher Stowe

In-universe information
- Gender: Male
- Religion: Christian
- Nationality: American

Uncle Tom is the title character of Harriet Beecher Stowe's 1852 novel Uncle Tom's Cabin. The character was seen in the Victorian era as a ground-breaking literary attack against the dehumanization of slaves. Tom is a deeply religious Christian preacher to his fellow slaves who uses nonresistance, but who accepts being flogged to death rather than violate the plantation's code of silence by informing against the route being used by two women who have just escaped from slavery. However, the character also came to be criticized for allegedly being inexplicably kind to white slaveowners, especially based on his portrayal in pro-compassion dramatizations. This led to the use of Uncle Tom — sometimes shortened to just a Tom — as a derogatory epithet for an exceedingly subservient person or house negro, particularly one accepting and uncritical of their own lower-class status.

== Original characterization and critical evaluations ==
At the time of the novel's initial publication in 1851, Uncle Tom was a rejection of the existing stereotypes of minstrel shows; Stowe's melodramatic story humanized the suffering of slavery for white audiences by portraying Tom as a young, strong Jesus-like figure who is ultimately martyred, beaten to death by a cruel master (Simon Legree) because he refuses to betray the whereabouts of two women who had escaped from slavery. Stowe reversed the gender conventions of slave narratives by juxtaposing Uncle Tom's passivity against the daring of three African American women who escape from slavery.

The novel was both influential and commercially successful, published as a serial from 1851 to 1852 and as a book from 1852 onward. An estimated 500,000 copies had sold worldwide by 1853, including unauthorized reprints. Senator Charles Sumner credited Uncle Tom's Cabin for the election of Abraham Lincoln, an opinion that is later echoed in the apocryphal story of Lincoln greeting Stowe with the quip, "So you're the little woman who wrote the book that made this great war!" Frederick Douglass praised the novel as "a flash to light a million camp fires in front of the embattled hosts of slavery." Despite Douglass's enthusiasm, an anonymous 1852 reviewer for William Lloyd Garrison's publication, The Liberator, suspected a racial double standard in the idealization of Uncle Tom:

Uncle Tom's character is sketched with great power and rare religious perception. It triumphantly exemplifies the nature, tendency, and results of Christian non-resistance. We are curious to know whether Mrs. Stowe is a believer in the duty of non-resistance for the white man, under all possible outrage and peril, as for the black man ... [For whites in parallel circumstances, it is often said] Talk not of overcoming evil with good – it is madness! Talk not of peacefully submitting to chains and stripes – it is base servility! Talk not of servants being obedient to their masters – let the blood of tyrants flow! How is this to be explained or reconciled? Is there one law of submission and non-resistance for the black man, and another of rebellion and conflict for the white man? When it is the whites who are trodden in the dust, does Christ justify them in taking up arms to vindicate their rights? And when it is the blacks who are thus treated, does Christ require them to be patient, harmless, long-suffering, and forgiving? Are there two Christs?

James Weldon Johnson, a prominent figure of the Harlem Renaissance, expressed an antipathetic opinion in his autobiography:

For my part, I was never an admirer of Uncle Tom, nor of his type of goodness; but I believe that there were lots of old Negroes as foolishly good as he.

In 1949, American writer James Baldwin rejected the emasculation of the title character "robbed of his humanity and divested of his sex" as the price of spiritual salvation for a dark-skinned man in a fiction whose African-American characters, in Baldwin's view, were invariably two-dimensional stereotypes. To Baldwin, Stowe was closer to a pamphleteer than a novelist and her artistic vision was fatally marred by polemics and racism that manifested especially in her handling of the title character. Stowe had stated that her sons had wept when she first read them the scene of Uncle Tom's death. But after Baldwin's essay, it ceased being respectable to accept the melodrama of the Uncle Tom story. Uncle Tom became what critic Linda Williams describes as "an epithet of servility" and the novel's reputation plummeted until feminist critics led by Jane Tompkins reassessed the tale's female characters.

According to Debra J. Rosenthal, in an introduction to a collection of critical appraisals for the Routledge Literary Sourcebook on Harriet Beecher Stowe's "Uncle Tom's Cabin", overall reactions have been mixed, with some critics praising the novel for affirming the humanity of the African American characters and for the risks Stowe assumed in taking a very public stand against slavery before abolitionism had become a socially acceptable cause, and others criticizing the very limited terms upon which those characters's humanity was affirmed and the artistic shortcomings of political melodrama.

== Inspiration ==
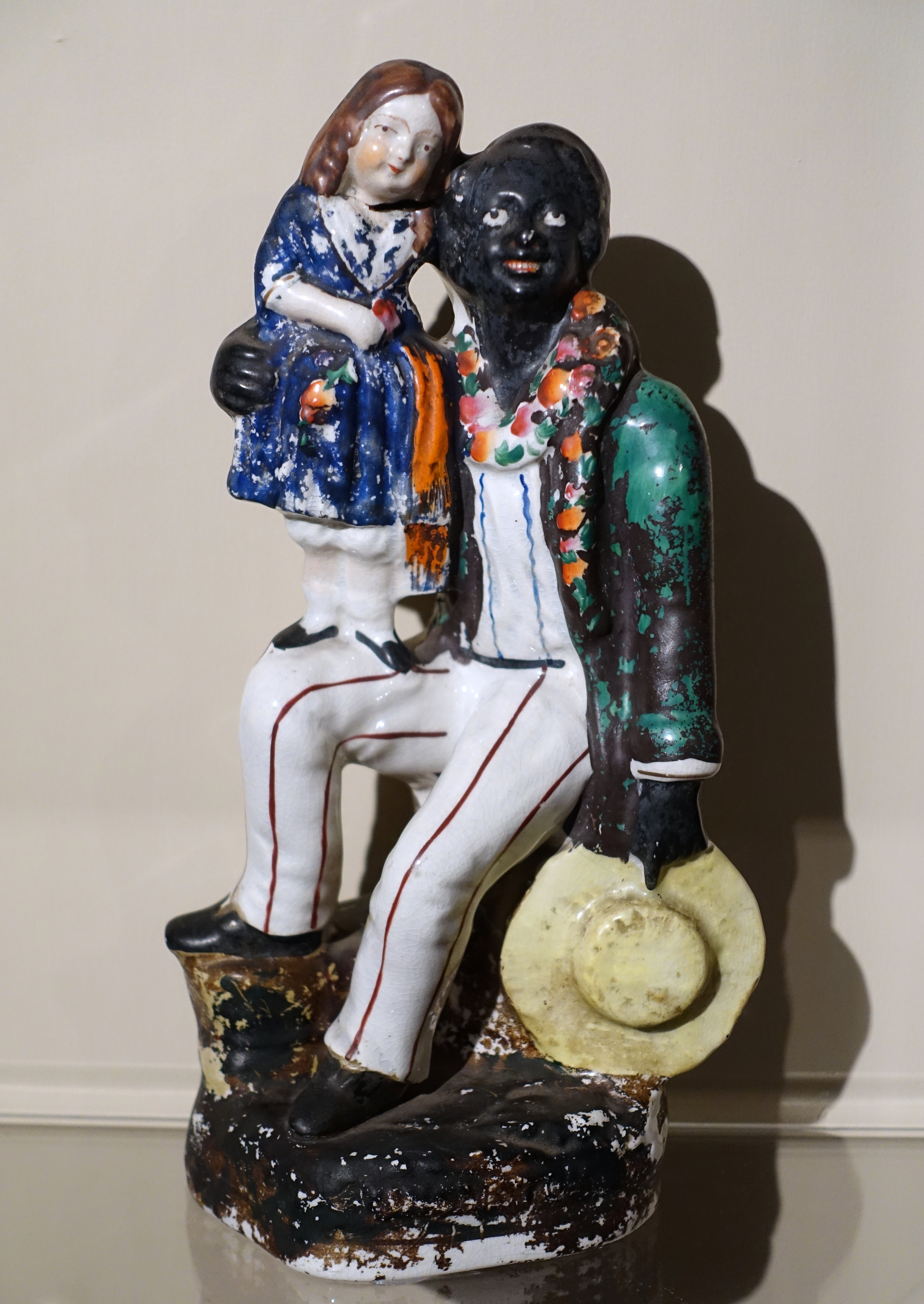
Uncle Tom and Eva, Staffordshire figure, England, 1855–1860, glazed and painted earthenware

A specific impetus for the novel was the Fugitive Slave Act of 1850, which imposed heavy fines upon law enforcement personnel in Northern states if they refused to assist the return of people who escaped from slavery. The new law also stripped African Americans of the right to request a jury trial or to testify on their own behalf, even if they were legally free, whenever a single claimant presented an affidavit of ownership. The same law authorized a $1000 (~$29,181 in 2024) fine and six months imprisonment for anyone who knowingly harbored or assisted a fugitive slave. These terms infuriated Stowe, so the novel was written, read, and debated as a political abolitionist tract.

Stowe drew inspiration for the Uncle Tom character from several sources. The best-known of these was Josiah Henson, an ex-slave whose autobiography, The Life of Josiah Henson, Formerly a Slave, Now an Inhabitant of Canada, as Narrated by Himself, was originally published in 1849 and later republished in two extensively revised editions after the publication of Uncle Tom's Cabin. Henson was enslaved at birth in 1789. He became a Christian at age eighteen and began preaching. Henson attempted to purchase his freedom for $450, but after selling his personal assets to raise $350 and signing a promissory note for the remainder, Henson's owner raised the price to $1000; Henson was unable to prove that the original agreement had been for a lesser amount. Shortly afterward Henson was ordered on a trip south to New Orleans. When he learned that he was to be sold there, he obtained a weapon. He contemplated murdering his white companions with the weapon, but decided against violence because his Christian morals forbade it. A sudden illness in one of his companions forced their return to Kentucky, and shortly afterward Henson escaped north with his family, settling in Canada where he became a civic leader.

Stowe read the first edition of Henson's narrative and later confirmed that she had incorporated elements from it into Uncle Tom's Cabin. Kentucky and New Orleans figure in both Henson's narrative and the novel's settings, and some other story elements are similar.

In the public imagination, however, Henson became synonymous with Uncle Tom. After Stowe's death her son and grandson claimed she and Henson had met before Uncle Tom's Cabin was written, but the chronology does not hold up to scrutiny and she probably drew material only from his published autobiography.

== Epithet ==
The term "Uncle Tom" is used as an epithet for an excessively subservient person, particularly when that person perceives their own lower-class status based on race. It is similarly used to negatively describe people who betray their own group by participating in its oppression, whether willingly or not. The term has also, with more intended neutrality, been applied in psychology in the form of "Uncle Tom syndrome", a term for the use of subservience, appeasement, and passivity to cope with intimidation and threats.

The popular negative connotations of "Uncle Tom" have largely been attributed to the numerous derivative works inspired by Uncle Tom's Cabin in the decade after its release, rather than to the original novel itself, whose title character is a more positive figure. These works, often called a "Tom show," lampooned and distorted the portrayal of Uncle Tom with politically loaded overtones.

=== History ===
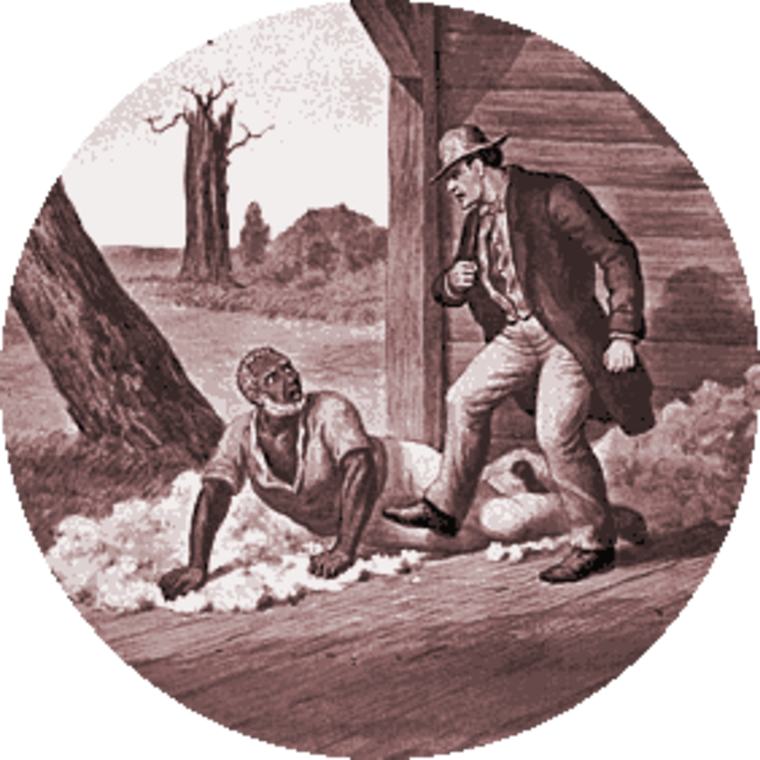
Uncle Tom, from an 1885 magic lantern series

American copyright law before 1856 did not give novel authors any control over derivative stage adaptations, so Stowe neither approved the adaptations nor profited from them. Minstrel show retellings in particular, usually performed by white men in blackface, tended to be derisive and pro-slavery, transforming Uncle Tom from a Christian martyr to a fool or apologist for slavery. The performer and theatre manager George Kunkel was the first to adapt Stowe's novel into the minstrel show format; portraying the role of Uncle Tom in its first minstrel show adaptation in Charleston, South Carolina in 1861. Kunkel became the most prominent minstrel show performer in that part, performing it throughout the United States for decades and on a tour of England in 1883. His last performance of the part was in January 1885 less than a month before his death.

Adapted theatrical performances of the novel, called Tom Shows, remained in continual production in the United States for at least 80 years beyond the 1850s (1930s). These representations had a lasting cultural impact and influenced the pejorative nature of the term Uncle Tom in later popular use.

Although not every minstrel depiction of Uncle Tom was negative, the dominant version developed into a character very different from Stowe's hero. Whereas Stowe's Uncle Tom was a young, muscular, and virile man who refused to obey his cruel master, Simon Legree, when Legree ordered him to beat other slaves, the stock character of the minstrel shows was degenerated into a shuffling, asexual individual, with a receding hairline and graying hair. For Jo-Ann Morgan, author of Uncle Tom's Cabin as Visual Culture, these shifting representations undermined the subversive layers of Stowe's original characterization by redefining Uncle Tom until he fitted within prevailing racist norms. Particularly after the Civil War, as the political thrust of the novel which had arguably helped to precipitate that war became obsolete to actual political discourse, popular depictions of the title character recast him within the apologetics of the Lost Cause of the Confederacy. The virile father of the abolitionist serial and first book edition degenerated into a decrepit old man, and with that transformation the character lost the capacity for resistance that had originally given meaning to his choices. Stowe never meant Uncle Tom to be a derided name, but the term, as a pejorative, has developed based on how later versions of the character, stripped of his inherent strength, were depicted on stage.

Claire Parfait, author of The Publishing History of Uncle Tom's Cabin, 1852–2002, opined that "the many alterations in retellings of the Uncle Tom story demonstrate an impulse to correct the retellers's perceptions of its flaws" and of "the capacity of the novel to irritate and rankle, even a century and a half after its first publication."

=== 20th-century cultural criticism ===
Spike Lee's 2000 film Bamboozled is a dark modern satire on media depictions of black people in America; the film features popular Black actors of the time such as Damon Wayans as Pierre "Peerless Dothan" Delacroix and Jada Pinkett Smith as Sloan Hopkins, comedians such as Tommy Davidson as Womack "Sleep 'n Eat" and Paul Mooney as Junebug, and hip hop artists such as Yasiin Bey formerly known as Mos Def as Julius "Big Blak Afrika" Hopkins and The Roots as the Alabama Porchmonkeys. Casting hip-hop artists also allowed the filmmaker to allude to the role of negative stereotyping gangsta rap in the early 2000s: "Spike Lee says in the DVD commentary [about Bamboozled] that gangsta rap is a kind of stereotype that doesn't advance the interests of blacks. He reiterated this position at his talk at Northeastern."

The Emmy Award-winning 1987 documentary film Ethnic Notions by Marlon Riggs narrates the history and legacy of the dehumanizing effects of African-American stereotypes and racializing caricatures from the "Loyal Uncle Tom" to grinning fools (see Stepin' Fetchit) in cartoons, minstrel shows, advertisements, household artifacts, and even children's rhymes.

== See also ==
- Acting white
- Uncle Tom Syndrome
- The Brothers Brothers
- House Negro
- Colonial mentality
- Cultural cringe
- Culchie
- Dic Siôn Dafydd
- Hanjian
- Jackeen
- Jump Jim Crow
- List of ethnic slurs
- Race traitor
- Respectability politics
- Shoneenism
- Stepin Fetchit
- Sycophant
- West Brit
- Uncle Ruckus
- Zappo Zap
