= Korean Teachers and Education Workers Union =

KTU
- Korean Teachers and Education Workers Union
- 전국교직원노동조합
- Founded: 1989
- Headquarters: Seoul, South Korea
- Location: South Korea
- Members: 77,000
- Affiliations: KCTU
- Website: english.eduhope.net

- Korean Teachers and Education Workers Union
- Hangul: 전국교직원노동조합
- Hanja: 全國敎職員勞動組合
- RR: Jeonguk gyojigwon nodongjohap
- MR: Chŏn'guk kyojigwŏn nodongjohap

Short name
- Hangul: 전교조
- Hanja: 全敎組
- RR: Jeongyojo
- MR: Chŏn'gyojo

The Korean Teachers and Education Workers Union (KTU; Korean: 전국교직원노동조합), also known as Jeongyojo (전교조; acronym for KTU in Korean language), is a labor union of teachers in South Korea. The organization has 77,000 members (down from 94,000) among the 360,000 public and private school teachers in the country.

== History ==
The KTU was founded in 1989 under opposition from the South Korean government. In response to its founding, several thousand members were subsequently fired by the education authorities. The KTU finally received official recognition in 1999 after the election of Kim Dae-Jung and many of the dismissed teachers were allowed to return to their former positions.

A major contributor to the Korean Confederation of Trade Unions, the KTU has been criticized by conservative media outlets for promoting pro-North Korea ideology.

By 2009, the KTU's ranks had dwindled, possibly due to parental and public opposition to its non-education-related political activities. A series of scandals also deeply undermined the union's credibility, including the attempted cover-up of a sexual assault on one of its members, as well as the sexual harassment of trainee teachers by KTU members.

In July 2009, the KTU's offices were raided by police on charges of issuing an anti-government statement allegedly in violation of the Civil Servants Law and the Educational Workers Labor Union Act, which bans political activities for teachers' unions on matters unrelated to working conditions. Union officials protested the investigation for being politically motivated. Per request by the KTU, the Education International, a multinational federation of teachers' unions, protested the investigations in a formal letter.

In April 2010, New Right politician Cho Jun-hyuk revealed the list of teachers who are affiliated with the KTU. This has led to a series of court decisions against him. This has later backfired as the KTU sought to file compensations against him.

In February 2011, the Seoul Metropolitan Education Board approved two KTU-affiliated school principals that caused controversies in their admission process.

In May 2011, KTU sued Gyeonggi-do regional politician Bak Gwang-jin, for releasing a list of teachers affiliated with the KTU.

On May 16, 2011, the head of a conservative parents' interest group Gyohakyeon (교육과 학교를 위한 학부모 연합) sent letters to approximately 60,000 KTU-affiliated teachers to resign their affiliation with KTU.

On December 9, 2011, the Incheon District Court released an official statement that the decision made by the Superintendent of Incheon Metropolitan Office of Education to penalize KTU-affiliated teachers for donating "illegal" funding to the Democratic Labor Party is unconstitutional.

== Oppositions ==
The South Korean Parents' Association for Reviving Public Education is a well-known opposition group against the KTU.

== See also ==
- Education in South Korea
- Politics of South Korea
