= West Briton =

West Briton may refer to:

- West Brit, a pejorative term for an Irish person alleged to be excessively sympathetic to or imitative of the British
- The West Briton, a local newspaper published in Truro, Cornwall, England
- A person from Wales (obsolete usage)
