= Anti-Japan Tribalism =

2019 book by Lee Young-hoon

- Author: Lee Young-hoon; Joung An-ki; Kim Nak-nyeon; Kim Yong-sam; Ju Ik-jong; Lee Woo-yeon
- Original title: 반일종족주의; 反日種族主義
- Language: Korean
- Published: July 10, 2019
- Publication place: South Korea
- Pages: 413 (Korean edition); 347 (Japanese edition)
- ISBN: 978-89-7087-326-8
- OCLC: 1112360280

Anti-Japan Tribalism: The Root of the Korean Crisis (Korean: 반일종족주의: 대한민국 위기의 근원; Hanja: 反日種族主義; lit. 'Anti-Japanese racism') is a book written by Lee Young-hoon (of the Naksungdae Institute of Economic Research), Joung An-ki, Kim Nak-nyeon, Kim Yong-sam, Ju Ik-jong, and Lee Woo-yeon. It was published by Miraesa on July 10, 2019. The Japanese version, published on November 14, 2019, is subtitled The Root of Japan-South Korea Crisis.

The book is based on a series of lectures delivered on the web-based Syngman Rhee TV, of which Lee is the host. The Japanese version was published by Bungeishunjū Ltd. in November 2019 and immediately became a bestseller (no. 1 on Amazon Japan on the day of publication). The book also became a bestseller in South Korea, topping the sales charts for seven consecutive weeks at 13 branches of one of the country's largest booksellers. The book became a bestseller in South Korea with 130,000 copies sold. Bungeishunjū announced it had sold 200,000 copies within a week. A translated English version of the book was published in March 2024.

The book has been criticized by South Korean historians for its historical distortions as well as its political bias, as many of its authors were associated with the New Right (South Korea).

== Content ==
Described as "anti-Japan tribalism," the book posits that there is a shamanistic mentality in a small minority of South Korean people who regard Japan as their primary enemy. Such a mentality, the authors argue, gave rise to some anti-Japan arguments among some South Koreans. In the book’s prologue titled "A Country of Lies," Lee Young-hoon speaks critically of the people who lie, the politics which lie, the scholarship of lies, and the trials of lies. According to this book, the lies are particularly noticeable in some instances of the South Korea's national history. Lee and the co-authors thus argue a minority of people in their country have created a small number of forged historical accounts.

== Table of contents ==
The table of contents of this book, in Japanese edition, is as following:

Preface to the Japanese Edition
Preface
Prologue: A Nation of Lies
Part 1: Memory of Tribalism
1. Absurd Arirang
2. A pistol in one hand, a surveying instrument in another hand
3. Did you say they plundered the land?
4. The approach of Japanese colonial administration
5. Myth of “the forced mobilization”
6. Was it really “forced labor” and “slave labor”?
7. Fictiveness of the wage discrimination against Koreans
8. Who are they, special army volunteers?
9. Originally, there was nothing to claim: The truth about the claim agreement
10. Stupid and shameless intrepid opposition against Korea-Japan talks
Part 2: Symbol and Fantasy of Tribalism
11. Inside facts of the myth surrounding Mt. Paektu
12. Dok-do, the supreme symbol of anti-Japan tribalism
13. The truth about the iron stakes myth
14. Dismantling of the former governor-general’s office building: Deleting the ROK's history
15. Fraudulent drama called the liquidation of pro-Japanese vestiges
16. A never ending story: "Compensation! Compensation! Compensation!"
17. Theology of anti-Japan tribalism
Part 3: Comfort Women, a Bastion of Tribalism
18. Comfort women within us
19. Establishment and culture of the registered prostitute system
20. The truth about the issue of Japanese military’s comfort women
21. In more than 40 years after the liberation, the issue of comfort women has not existed
22. Until the day when the Korea-Japan relations fail
Epilogue: Retribution of the Anti-Japan Tribalism
Commentary: A Patriotism Interrogated by "Anti-Japan Tribalism"

== Controversy ==
Former Minister of Justice Cho Kuk criticized it for downplaying Imperial Japan’s wartime actions, including forced labor. In response, author Lee Young-hoon dismissed Cho’s remarks as misrepresentations of the book’s arguments.

Professors from various South Korean universities co-authored a comprehensive critique on the book, titled Japanese Imperialist Tribalism and published in October 2019. Academics and experts lambasted “Anti-Japan Tribalism,” including the book's claims that forced labor conscription “did not occur” and that comfort women were “not sexual slaves” to the Japanese military. Critics also noted that the claims in “Anti-Japan Tribalism” concerning the Japanese military comfort women system have already been academically dismissed.

Kang Sung-hyun, a research professor at the Sungkonghoe University Institute for East Asian Studies, said, “Current research findings have clearly established that while the Japanese military comfort women system may have been modeled on a colonial licensed prostitution system, it transformed into a more oppressive model; that there was widespread forced mobilization against the individual’s will, and the licensed prostitution system was illegal under both Japanese criminal law and international law before the war; that the lives of comfort women were equivalent to sexual slavery; and that not only colonial licensed prostitution systems but also Japan’s own licensed prostitution system should viewed from a perspective of sexual enslavement.”

Critics also noted that “Most of the writers (of the book) are members of the New Right, and the alternative, Kyohak, and state-designated historical textbooks they spearheaded were discontinued for their whitewashing of collaboration and dictatorship and their inadequate content...Their aim, like that of the Japanese far-right group Japanese Society for History Textbook Reform, is to increase popular influence in order to rally conservatives and strengthen their own position.”

Yuji Hosaka published a critique on the book in April 2020, arguing that the authors are "New Pro-Japanese Collaborators" (신친일파).

== See also ==
- Theory of colonial modernization
- Chinilpa
- Japan–Korea disputes
- Special Law to Redeem Pro-Japanese Collaborators' Property
- Oh Sonfa
