= Salesian High School (South Korea) =

High school in Gwangju, South Korea

Coordinates: 35°12′57″N 126°53′29″E

- Hangul: 살레시오고등학교
- Hanja: 살레시오高等學校
- RR: Sallesio godeunghakgyo
- MR: Sallesio kodŭnghakkyo

Salesian High School is a Catholic high school in Gwangju, South Korea. It was founded in March 1959. It was rated as one of the best private schools in Gwangju four times (in 1998, 1999, 2000, 2002), and nationally acclaimed as one of the best 100 schools in South Korea in 2004.

== Notable alumni ==
- U Yun-geun, politician
- Kim Wan-seop, journalist
- O Yeong-jeong, professional Starcraft player (AnyTime)
- Byun Hee-bong, actor
- Im Hyun-sik, actor
- Jeong Dong-chae, politician, 41st Minister of Culture, Sports, and Tourism from July 2004 to March 2006
- Yi Sang-guk, former chairman of the Korea Baseball Organization
- Yoon Tae-ho, web-toon writer known for Misaeng and Moss
- Yoon Jang-hyeon, mayor of Gwangju since July 2014
- Choi Ki-sang, member of the National Assembly for Geumcheon since 2020

== See also ==
- Salesians of Don Bosco
