= Choi Ki-sang =

South Korean politician (born 1969)

- 최기상

Member of the National Assembly
- Incumbent
- Assumed office 30 May 2020
- Preceded by: Lee Hoon
- Constituency: Seoul Geumcheon

Personal details
- Born: 7 October 1969 (age 57) Yeongam South Jeolla, South Korea
- Party: Democratic
- Education: Salesian High School; Seoul National University

Choi Ki-sang (Korean: 최기상; born 7 October 1969) is a South Korean politician and former judge serving as a member of the National Assembly for Seoul Geumcheon since 30 May 2020. He is a member of the Democratic Party of Korea. He currently serves as head of the Ethics Inspection Group of the Democratic Party of Korea, and deputy floor leader of law within the party. Prior to politics, Choi was the chief judge of the Seoul Central District Court.

== Early life and education ==
Choi was born on 7 October 1969 in Yeongam. He graduated from Salesian High School in Gwangju, before graduating from the Department of Business Administration at Seoul National University in 1994.

== Career ==
Choi completed law training in 1996, and became a judge at the Gwangju District Court in 1999. He switched between various courts around Korea over the next decade, before becoming the chief judge at the Seoul Central District Court in 2015. He switched to chief judge at the Seoul Northern District Court in 2018.

=== Political career ===
Choi ran for the Democratic Party of Korea in Seoul Geumcheon in the 2020 South Korean legislative election, winning the election with 64,735 votes, and a majority of 49.63%. Until May 2021 he served as deputy chairman of the policy committee within the party, and from May 2021 until October 2022 he served as standing vice chairman of the policy committee. He currently serves as head of the Ethics Inspection Team, and as deputy floor leader of the Democratic Party (law).

He is also currently a member of the Special Committee on Budget and Accounts, and member of the Legislation and Judiciary Committee.

In late 2022, Choi announced a bill to support the relocation of a military base in the centre of the constituency. Later, Choi also announced an initiative to amend the Public Official Election Act, to alleviate excessive restrictions on people's freedom of political expression.

== Electoral history ==
Election	Year	Post	Party affiliation	Votes	Percentage of votes	Results
21st General Election	2020	Member of National Assembly from Seoul Geumcheon	Democratic Party	64,735	49.63%	Won
22nd General Election	2024	Member of National Assembly from Seoul Geumcheon	Democratic Party	78,587	59.03%	Won
