= Crachach =

Pejorative for a Welsh-speaking elite

Crachach (Welsh pronunciation: [ˈkraχaχ]) is a pejorative term used to refer to a perceived Welsh-speaking interconnected elite who control the arts, media, civil service and higher education sectors in Wales. The term translates as "petty gentry", "conceited upstarts", or "snobs", but has developed into a wider populist conspiracy theory.

The theory is similar to others elsewhere that assert the existence of a cabal which exists in much of the Western world. Welsh language detective thriller show Y Gwyll translated the term in its English subtitles as "cognoscenti". The broader theories claim that the Welsh-speaking elite dominate influential positions in the arts, politics, academia and the media largely on the basis of their Welsh language knowledge.

To some Welsh speakers, the term is offensive in meaning. Some writers have described it as "an attack on Welsh speakers".

== Origins ==
Crachach in Welsh means 'petty gentry; conceited upstarts, snobs'. It is most common in the dialects of south Wales. Crachach is derived from crach, which has the basic meaning of 'scabs (on the skin)' and a secondary meaning of 'snobs'.

The term has only taken hold as a wider conspiracy theory in recent decades as documented by Richard Wyn Jones. The theory is unique to other British populist theories in that the elite described are claimed to be largely Welsh-speaking. It is compared and contrasted with the pejorative term "taffia".

=== Term of abuse ===
The term crachach is considered to be offensive by some, as it stigmatises a linguistic minority, and suggests their involvement in a conspiracy of some sorts. The late Labour MP Paul Flynn had called crachach "a term of mild abuse".

Simon Brooks has written that crachach 'is best described as "hate speech" against those from a minority (i.e. Welsh-speaking) background who have the impunity not to be poor, and not to be bullied into giving up their own culture'. He notes that there are no equivalent terms for those of other backgrounds who hold influential posts in Wales.

Critics of the term have described its users as making "an attack on Welsh speakers." Author Patrick McGuinness has described the term as "generating a culture of envy" and "tribalism and divisiveness" in Welsh society. Opposing Conservative politicians at the time responded to his comments by stating the term is merely "challenging a cosy consensus within the arts world in Wales."

== Political use ==
Among English-speaking political commentators, the theory is often employed to suggest the existence of a Welsh-speaking elite whose interests are opposed to those of the majority of the Welsh people. Academic Richard Wyn Jones has argued that fear of such a supposed Welsh-speaking elite was characteristic of anti-devolutionists in the 1979 Welsh devolution referendum:

There was a perception amongst anti-devolutionists that devolution was some sort of plot by the establishment, by the crachach. Their [the anti-devolutionists'] idea that they were standing up for 'the people' was reinforced by 1979.

The term is sometimes used in political discourse in Wales. As First Minister of Wales, the Labour politician Rhodri Morgan stated that Wales would have "Cynulliad y werin, nid Cynulliad y crachach" ('an Assembly of the people, not an Assembly of the crachach').

In 2010, Welsh Labour education minister Leighton Andrews criticised the Higher Education sector in Wales for not contributing to Welsh prosperity levels: "For too many in Wales, higher education remains a distant, and irrelevant activity, clouded in mystery [...] It appears that higher education governance in post-devolution Wales has become the last resting place of the crachach".

== Use in the media ==
The theory does not regularly arise in the English-language media in Wales. However since the development of the National Assembly for Wales in the late 1990s and the legislature's policy of increasing the number of Welsh speakers, it has been used in debate often by critics of the language and of devolution more broadly.

Journalist Carolyn Hitt referred to the theory in an article written in the early 2000s, which she would later downplay as "tongue-in-cheek".

Supremely confident in all social situations, you can spot them by their habit of looking over your left shoulder as they scan the room for someone more important than you to talk to. Older crachach can be fiercely Welsh nationalist yet not averse to receiving gongs from the Queen. Younger arty crachach will always get their projects funded, however rubbish they may be. [...] Crachach society is not a meritocracy. If the crachach had a coat of arms, the motto would be that old chestnut: 'It's who you know not what you know and make sure you're belonging to someone on the committee.'

When then Welsh Secretary, William Hague MP, in 1997 became engaged to marry a member of his staff Ffion Jenkins (the daughter of the one-time head of the Welsh Arts Council, Emyr Jenkins), Roger Dobson of The Independent wrote that Hague was marrying into the crachach. He quoted Rhodri Morgan as saying of Ffion Jenkins:

As far as the Crachach are concerned, she's marrying a commoner. A nameless 'Welsh poet' was quoted as saying that "The Crachach as we know it has really been built up over the last 30 to 40 years when the establishment of Wales has gravitated to Cardiff. It's a ruling elite, a lot of whom are related. When it comes to networking they make the Masons look like inadequates".

== See also ==
- Dic Siôn Dafydd
