= O Sonfa =

Korean-Japanese academic (born 1956)

Japanese name
- Kanji: 呉 善花
- Kana: オ・ソンファ

Korean name
- Hangul: 오선화
- Hanja: 吳善花
Transcriptions
- Revised Romanization: O Seonhwa
- McCune–Reischauer: O Sŏnhwa

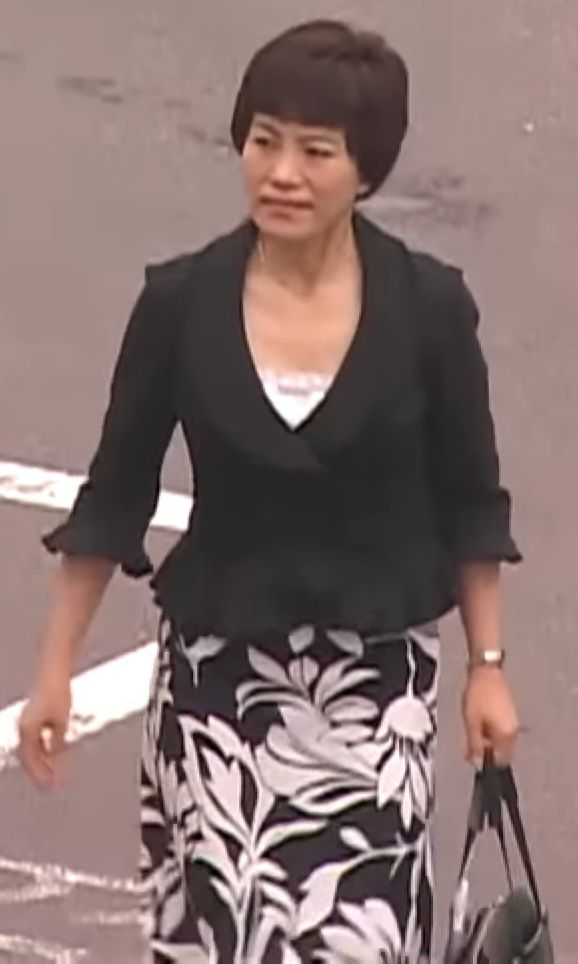
Professor O Sonfa of Takushoku University in Japan, captured on camera by the MBC program PD Notebook in 2006

O Sonfa (Japanese: 呉 善花; オ・ソンファ, born 15 September 1956), also known by her Korean name Oh Seon-hwa (Korean: 오선화), is a former professor in the School of International Relations at Takushoku University in Tokyo. She is currently a professor of International Relations at Tokyo International University. She is also active as an author and journalist in Japan. She is a critic in many fields such as current issues, history, and culture, particularly in East Asian Countries.

Originally from Jeju Island, South Korea, she left for Japan in 1983. She received a BA degree from Daito Bunka University and an MA degree from the Graduate School of North American Studies at Tokyo University of Foreign Studies. She went on to naturalise as a Japanese citizen.

In 1998, she lost her South Korean nationality as she had acquired Japanese nationality in 1991. In 2007 and 2013, she was refused entry to South Korea.

She has since been a source of controversy in Korea due to her open criticism of not only the South Korean government, but Korean culture as a whole. After the 2014 sinking of MV Sewol disaster, she described Koreans as "having no patriotism and completely selfish", and argued that Japan should not try to reconcile its differences with South Korea.

O denies that "comfort women", a euphemism for Korean women who are considered by international consensus to have been forced prostitutes during World War II, were forced to work at all.

== Publications ==
- Getting Over It! Why Korea Needs to Stop Bashing Japan (ISBN 978-4813325499). Tachibana Publishing: 2015
- What Makes Korea Insult Japan: Truth Behind Korea's Resentment Over Japan (ISBN 978-4864716208). Hikaruland Publishing Co. Ltd.: 2017

== See also ==
- Kim Wan-seop
- Pak Noja
- Korean studies
