= New Right (South Korea) =

Political movement

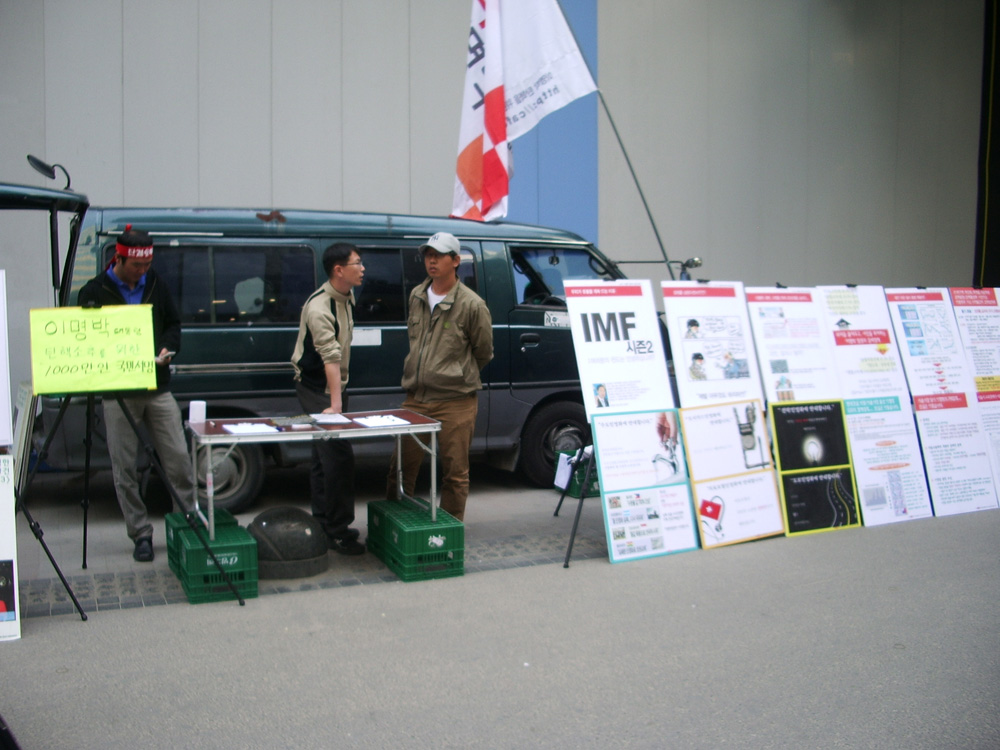
New Right supporters rally against Lee Myung-bak in Myeongdong in 2008.

The New Right (Korean: 뉴라이트; MR: nyurait'ŭ) movement in South Korean politics is a school of political thought which developed as a reaction against the traditional divide between conservatives (the "Old Right") and progressives. The New Right broke from past conservatives, who had supported state intervention, by promoting economically liberal, free market ideas.

Many figures of the New Right, such as Lee Young-hoon have also become notable for criticizing the liberal or progressive camp for their promotion of anti-Japanese sentiment in Korea and their policy for peace and unification with North Korea. The movement was initiated by former pro–North Korean activists, North Korean defectors to the South and anti-communists. Opponents of the New Right movement described this as anti-leftism, military dictatorship advocates, pseudo right-wing, opposition to Korean nationalism, pro-sadaejuui, and Japanophilia. While engaging in activities against North Korea that resonate with many security-oriented South Koreans, they also expressed sympathy to pro-Japanese historical negationism, which elicited a sense of aversion and suspicion toward them.

== History ==
Before the era of democratisation, South Korea had been ruled almost continuously by a series of dictatorships, such as those of Syngman Rhee and Park Chung Hee. These regimes were characterised by stringent anti-communism, ethnonationalism, authoritarianism, and state capitalism, and as a result these attributes came to be seen as hallmarks of the older generation of Korean conservatives. After 1987, following democratisation, conservatives adapted and modified their previous positions in order to counteract the rising successes of left-wing activism in South Korean politics.

Nonetheless, the conservative parties of the old style continued to hold a negative association with corruption of the past for many, and throughout the 1990s and into the early 2000s, progressivism characterised by support for social liberalism and a soft attitude towards North Korea became dominant in politics. As a result of this, a number of reform-minded right-wing groups known as the "New Right" developed in the 2000s as a reaction to the ascendency of these progressives, whose ideology they considered harmful. Like the old conservatives, they opposed left-wing economic policies and a soft attitude toward North Korea. However, they also attempted to distance themselves from the sins of the older right-wing, which they viewed as stagnant and out-of-touch. Describing themselves as "rational conservatives," these groups expressed a more flexible attitude towards North Korea through a willingness to recognise it as a separate country (Note: Most South Korea's liberals, progressives, and "old right" conservatives consider North Korea to be within the constitutional territory of the Republic of Korea, based on the Legitimacy Theory of the Provisional Government. However, the "new right" conservatives (analogous to Taiwan's Huadu nationalists) regard North Korea and South Korea as separate countries; they are more skeptical of minjok reunification than traditional conservatives.) and to provide humanitarian aid for the citizens of North Korea. However, they balanced this with an anti-communist attitude and a support for human rights in North Korea and free-market economic policies in South Korea. They also rejected the totalitarianism of the past and placed an emphasis on civil rights and liberty; overall, their views were associated with classical liberalism.

Initially, these "New Right" groups contained many figures connected to the traditional conservative establishment and as a result they initially struggled to differentiate themselves from old-school conservatives from the dictatorship era. This could be seen following the victory of conservative Lee Myung-bak in the 2007 presidential election; Lee's administration succeeded in replacing many progressive members of government-affiliated deliberative and advisory committees with members of "New Right" organizations. Lee's successor, Park Geun-hye (the eldest daughter of the "Old Right" authoritarian Park Chung Hee), continued to maintain close relationships with these New Right conservative social groups, even as her administration displayed an antagonistic attitude towards anti-government leftist demonstrations and labor strikes.

Unlike the moderate early New Right movement in the 2000s, the New Right movement has become increasingly extreme since the 2010s. It began with the rise of "Taegukgi rallies" (Street Mobilization), who were outraged by the impeachment of Park Geun-hye, which was seen by her supporters as politically motivated. Mainly elderly conservatives, they became increasing disillusioned at the conservative establishment for having supported the impeachment process, an unforgivable act in the politically polarized political environment of South Korea. The movement previously operated via seminars and books then escalated into massive weekly street protests aimed at delegitimizing the liberal Moon Jae-in government, which was further fueled by conservative YouTube channels, which weaponized disinformation, extreme anti-communism and conspiracy theories regarding Park's downfall. New Right scholars began to come under criticism for supporting the historical revisionist and extreme right-wing view of Gwangju Uprising. Critics viewed Moon's engagement policies toward North Korea as either a dangerous delusion or a deliberate capitulation to Pyongyang and argued that his administration was overly trusting of the Kim regime, undermined national security and weakened the alliance with the United States.

In the early 2020s, the movement broadened its reach to disenfranchised young men in their 20s and 30s after having shifted part of its focus towards modern grievance politics, utilizing fierce anti-feminist rhetoric and economic populism to court young voters who felt alienated by the liberal social policies of the Moon administration. Mainstream conservative politics began to integrate these hardline elements, which was a contributing factor to Yoon Suk-yeol election as president in 2022.

There is an evaluation that the New Right movement has a direct or indirect effect on the Yoon Suk Yeol government.

== Political views ==
The New Right's view of modern and contemporary Korean history is known to be contrary to the view of progressive Korean nationalists. The New Right movement is led by descendants of those who collaborated with the Japanese imperialism and Kokkashugi (國家主義) during the time when Korea was a Japanese colony.

The New Right movement opposes Korean ethnic nationalism (민족주의; 民族主義) and is a radical advocate for South Korean-based state nationalism (국가주의; 國家主義); (Note: In Korean language, minjok (민족) is generally translated as "nation", "people", or "ethnic group", but some South Korean conservatives, including New Right activists, sometimes translate it as "race"; they criticize left-leaning anti-colonial minjok nationalism as "anti-Japanese racism".) they oppose anti-Japanese ethno-nationalism as promoted by progressives, positively evaluated the history of modernization caused by Japanese colonial rule and supported the view that South Korea was founded in 1948, when the official government was established, not 1919, when the Provisional Government was established, which has been criticized by opponents for downplaying the history of the independence movement. The Korean Provisional Government had incorporated communists and leftists into its ranks during specific phases of its exile existence, notably adopting a united front strategy to bridge nationalist and leftist factions. That historical inclusion created a deep, lasting ideological battleground that still intensely divides South Korean politics today. This came to a head when conservative officials under Yoon pushed to remove all commemorations by progressives and liberals of Korean independence leftists such as General Hong Beom-do due to his membership in the Soviet Communist Party in the 1920s in order to secure aid for Korean independence and instead heavily championed right-wing exile leaders such as Kim Ku (who later fought against communist expansion) and Syngman Rhee.

New Right scholars try to promote pro-American (친미; 親美) and pro-Japanese (친일; 親日) sentiment among South Koreans. South Korea's New Rightists have a strong anti-communist perception of North Korea and a favorable perception of Japan and the United States. They also hold strong anti-Chinese and anti-North Korean views, having viewed the Chinese Communist Party (CCP) as a threat to South Korea economic and security interests and accused liberals and progressives of working with China and North Korea to undermine the South Korea-US-Japan military alliance.

According to South Korean political experts, the New Right movement is based on the Korean sadaejuui sentiment.

=== Criticism ===
New Right movement has often been criticized by many South Korean media and experts for being "reactionary" or "far-right".

There is a controversy that New Right scholars support the colonialist view of Japanese people. New Right scholars have been criticized socially for accepting Japanese historical revisionism for Japanese war crimes. Even Hong Joon-pyo, known as a hardline conservative, criticized New Rightist perception of history. Yuji Hosaka, an ethnically Japanese naturalized South Korean, accused New Right of being a new Chinilpa in support of Japanese far-right. Hosaka accused South Korean New Right scholars of sympathizing with Nippon Kaigi's view of history. Lee Woo-yeon, co-author of Anti-Japan Tribalism, was funded by a Japanese far-right groups, according to a report by the Kyunghyang Shinmun.

Chin Jung-kwon, a political commentator, said "Japanese far-right politics is 'sadistic' and South Korean far-right politics is 'masochistic'", and "the 'colonialist historical perspective' is a 'political sadomasochism' directed by Japanese and South Korean far-right as sex partners". Brian Reynolds Myers, an American Koreanist scholar who opposes Korean [ethnic] nationalism (minjok) and supports South Korean [state] nationalism, but criticized the New Right activists' approach as "this is the worst way to install [state] patriotism in the populace.".

The New Right movement is often criticized for its worship of authoritarian politicians in addition to pro-Japanese historical revisionism. In particular, the number of dictators Syngman Rhee and Park Chung-hee statues, has been increasing by South Korean conservatives, including New Right activists, since 2009. This is contrary to the example of Taiwan, which has been reducing the number of dictator Chiang Kai-shek statues since the 2010s.

== Activism ==
=== Historiography ===
One aspect of the New Right that has been highly notable is the recent production of historical studies by New Right-oriented academics which seek to oppose traditional Korean views of history. Some of these best-selling books argue against the overwhelmingly negative view of Imperial Japan and also dispute specific details about the comfort women discussion. Some of these authors also suggest that Japan helped Korea to modernise, both politically and economically.

=== Conservative education ===
Some well-known politicians from the "old right" GNP indicated commonality with the New Right groups, including Park Geun-hye endorse the anti-North Korean New Right's version of alternative Korean History textbooks through a foundation called Text Book Forum. The Lee Myung-bak government's Ministry of Education, Science and Technology has tried to implant the next Korean New Right version of Korean history textbook for the public school usage. The NR's groups' demanding pressure to use their hawkish Korean history textbooks has eventually make them inconsistently incompatible with the dovish ethics textbooks.

== Media ==
- (in Korean) Gyegan Sidaejeongsin (계간 시대정신)
- (in Korean) New Daily (뉴데일리)
- (in Korean) Syngman Rhee TV (이승만TV)

== Organizations ==
- Liberal Party (2020) (자유당)
- Liberal Democratic Party (자유민주당)
- (in Korean) New Right National Union (뉴라이트전국연합)
- (in Korean) Sidaejeongsin (시대정신)

== Members ==
- An Byeong-jik
- Cho Jun-hyuk
- Hong Jin-pyo
- Lee Young-hoon
- Lee Woo-yeon
- Park Yu-ha (Note: She doesn't admit she's a New Right scholar. However, South Korean liberals/progressives and most of the South Korean public refer to her as a New Right scholar.)
- Shin Ji-ho
- Yoon Suk Yeol

== See also ==
- Conservatism in South Korea
- Idaenam
- Ilminism - New Rightists are controversial because of their excessive glorification of Syngman Rhee.
- Neo-reactionary movement
  - Sadaejuui
- Radical anti-communism#In South Korean politics
