= Comfort Women of the Japanese Empire =

Book by Park Yuha

Comfort Women of the Empire: Colonial Rule and Battle over Memory is a book by South Korean scholar Park Yu-ha, which challenges established narratives regarding the comfort women system during Imperial Japan's occupation of Korea.

== Synopsis ==
Park Yuha's Comfort Women of the Empire examines the comfort women issue beyond the conventional narrative of forced sexual slavery, instead portraying it as a complicated system influenced by imperial policies, economic incentives, and social hierarchies of the time. Drawing from historical documents and testimony from former comfort women, the book highlights cases where women reportedly developed comrade-like relationships with Japanese soldiers, received care, or even fell in love with them.

Park asserts that during Japan's colonization of Korea, both nations were technically considered part of the same empire, which challenges the notion that the Japanese government officially conducted systematic abductions of Korean women. Instead, she argues that many women were deceived and sold into comfort stations by private brokers, a practice facilitated by Korea's existing patriarchal and economic structures.

The book also criticizes the Korean Council for Justice and Remembrance (formerly Jong-Dae-Hyup, 정대협), a prominent South Korean NGO advocating for comfort women, for focusing solely on Japan's legal responsibility while disregarding cases that do not fit the mainstream narrative of "teenage girls forcibly abducted by the Japanese military." Park argues that suppressing alternative testimonies marginalizes other victims and fragments their experiences.

Park concludes that both Korea and Japan must acknowledge historical realities in order to achieve true reconciliation. She calls on Japan to apologize for its colonial rule and the comfort women issue not only for moral reasons but to foster greater regional cooperation in East Asia.

== Editions ==
- A Japanese edition was published in Japan in November 2014.
- On February 1, 2016, Park released the book online in an effort to encourage open discussion on the comfort women issue.
- On July 29, 2024, the book was published in English under the title Comfort Women of the Japanese Empire: Colonial Rule and Battle over Memory by Routledge.

== Reception ==
Park's book sparked controversy in South Korea for challenging the dominant view of comfort women as exclusively victims of state-organized abduction and sexual slavery. This book has faced criticism for promoting historical negationism.

=== Scholarly and international opinion ===
The prosecution of Park Yuha drew strong criticism from intellectuals worldwide, particularly regarding concerns over academic freedom.

- On November 25, 2015, 54 Japanese scholars and intellectuals, including Nobel laureate Kenzaburō Ōe, former Prime Minister Tomiichi Murayama, and Tokyo University professor Chizuko Ueno, issued a statement condemning the South Korean government's legal action against Park and calling for her immediate acquittal.
- 190 South Korean intellectuals later signed a similar petition defending Park's right to academic research.
- On January 17, 2017, prominent scholars Noam Chomsky (MIT) and Bruce Cumings (University of Chicago) joined international calls to drop charges against Park.

On January 25, 2017, the Seoul Dongbu District Court ruled in Park's favor, acquitting her of all criminal defamation charges. The court stated that there was no evidence that Park had acted with malicious intent to harm victims, nor did she violate research ethics.
