= Legitimacy Theory of the Provisional Government =

Theory about South Korean history

The Legitimacy Theory of the Provisional Government (Korean: 임시정부 법통론 or 임정법통론; Hanja: 臨時政府 法統論 or 臨政法統論; lit. '[Korean] Provisional Government Legitimism') claims that the Provisional Government of the Republic of Korea and its successors is the only legitimate government with representation of Koreans and the entire Korean Peninsula, and that legitimacy is inherited by the present Republic of Korea (South Korea). The current Constitution of the Republic of Korea, which was finalized and revised in 1987, supports this Legitimism. According to this theory, the time when the Republic of Korea was founded was in 1919, not 1948.

== History ==
According to the KPG Legitimism, the Republic of Korea was founded in 1919, when the Provisional Government was established, not in 1948, when the official South Korean government was established; this view was supported by the Syngman Rhee, and the Korea Democratic Party. KPG Legitimism became the main basis for right-wing conservative/anti-communist forces who opposed left-wing Government of People's Republic of Korea, which lasted from 1945 to 1946, and later supported the establishment of a conservative/anti-communist government south of the 38th parallel.

In the mid-to-late 20th century, the KPG Legitimism was generally accepted by South Korean anti-communist conservative political forces, but in the 21st century, questions about the KPG Legitimism were raised within conservative political forces, including the New Right Movement.

Today, the Democratic Party of Korea, mainstream centre to centre-left liberal party, and the successor of the Korean Democratic Party, supports the KPG Legitimism.

== See also ==
- Controversy over National Foundation Day in South Korea
- First Republic of Korea
- White Shirts Society
- Irish republican legitimism
