= Kim Wan-seop =

- 김완섭 (金完燮)
- Born: 1963 (age 62–63); Gwangju, South korea
- Occupations: writer, novelist, journalist, educator

- Kim Wan-seop
- Hangul: 김완섭
- Hanja: 金完燮
- RR: Gim Wanseop
- MR: Kim Wansŏp

Kim Wan-seop (Korean: 김완섭; Hanja: 金完燮; born 1963) is a South Korean writer, novelist, journalist, and educator. A native of Gwangju, he participated in the 1980 Gwangju Democratization Movement.

== Life ==
Kim was born in Gwangju in 1963. He graduated from Salesian High School in 1982, and entered Seoul National University the same year, majoring in physics and also studying history and political economy. However, he dropped out in 1989 to begin working as a journalist, at first focusing on computers.

He dropped out in the same year of the strike of Kuro-Kuchung. He later began work as a novelist. He lived in Australia between 1996 and 1998.

== Political views ==
Kim is one of the last survivors of the "Gwangju Democratization Movement's Peoples Army".

Kim is identified in the media as pro-Japanese due to his political positions and alleged glamorization of Japanese colonial rule in Korea, and has been accused of character defamation against various historical Korean nationalists. In 2004, a Seoul prosecutor indicted him for comments he made about Kim Gu. In 2006, Kim Eul-dong, the granddaughter of early 20th-century Korean nationalist Kim Chwajin, accused him of defamation of character for comments he made about Kim Jwa-jin in an essay posted on portal site Daum.

== Works ==
- 마이크로소프트 윈도우 3 [Microsoft Windows 3], 紀翰齋 [Gihanjae], 1991
- 한글 윈도우 : 3.01 [Hangul Windows: 3.01], 하이테크정보출판부 [Haitekeu Jeongbo Chulpanbu], 1992
- 창녀론: 21세기형 인간 을 위한 새 여성 이론 [Whores: a new theory of feminism for 21st-century humanity], 춘추사 [Chunchusa], 1996, ISBN 978-89-7815-016-3, OCLC 35893721

== See also ==
- Lee Young-hoon
- Park Yu-ha
