= Cho Jun-hyuk =

South Korean politician (born 1960)

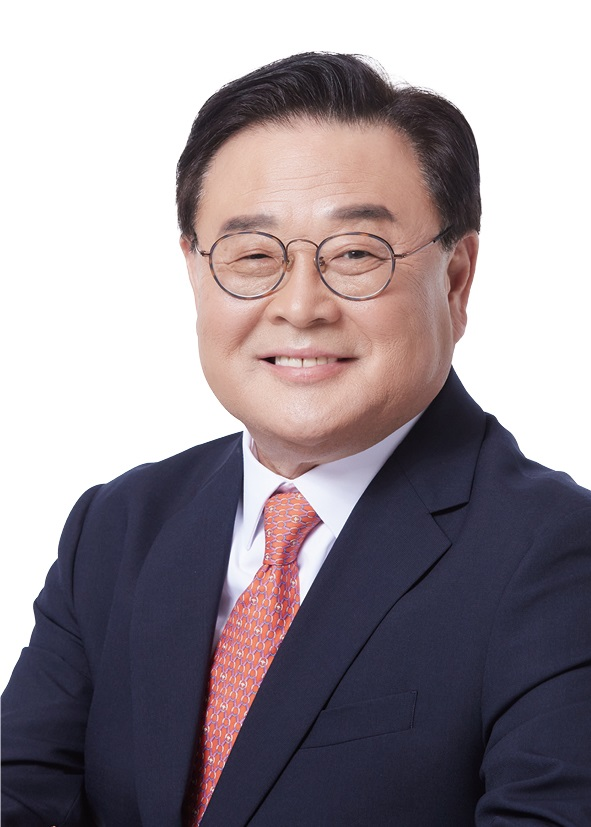

Personal details
- Born: 14 July 1960 (age 66) Gwangju; Jeollanam-do South Korea
- Party: Grand National Party
- Education: Korea University; University of Wisconsin–Madison
- Profession: Politician
- Website: Official Website

- Cho Jun-hyuk
- Hangul: 조전혁
- Hanja: 趙全赫
- RR: Jo Jeonhyeok
- MR: Cho Chŏnhyŏk

Cho Jun-hyuk (Korean: 조전혁; born 14 July 1960) is a South Korean politician and an advocate of the South Korean New Right political movement. He is currently the head of the conservative teachers' union, Union of Education Movement for Liberal Democracy (자유주의교육운동연합).

== Controversy ==
=== Korean Teachers & Education Workers' Union Dispute ===
Cho Jun-hyuk published a list of teachers affiliated with the liberal Korean Teachers & Education Workers' Union on Donga Ilbo, a conservative Chojoongdong newspaper on 20 April 2010.

This later backfired. The KTU filed a court proposal to confiscate his assets in 2010. This problem has led to the Incheon District Court's decision to confiscate his political fundings and other government taxes.

== Works ==
- Cho, Jun-hyuk, 경제학으로 세상 바로보기, 해남 (8 October 2004), ISBN 978-89-86703-61-0

=== As Co-author ===
- Cho, Jun-hyuk & Hong, Jin-pyo 전교조 없는 세상에 살고 싶다, 기파랑 (21 November 2006), ISBN 9788991965706

== See also ==
- New Right (South Korea)
