= Tochak Waegu =

Korean pejorative term

Tochak waegu (Korean: 토착왜구; Hanja: 土着倭寇; lit. 'indigenous Japanese pirates'), or To-wae for short, is a South Korean political insult primarily used by South Korean leftists against South Korean conservatives perceived to be pro-Japanese. Tochak waegu is similar to the terms maegukno (Korean: 매국노; Hanja: 賣國奴; lit. 'betrayer') and minjok banyeokja (Korean: 민족반역자; Hanja: 民族反逆者; lit. 'national rebels or traitors').

== Political position ==
In South Korea, liberals and leftists tend to be more anti-Japanese than conservatives. The term Tochak Waegu is commonly used to criticize South Korean conservatives for their relatively favorable foreign policy towards Japan. It is also used as a derogatory term for those who sympathize with the Japanese right or are perceived as too lenient toward Japan. As a result, Tochak Waegu are considered ethnic traitors.

Some South Korean scholars argue that defending the policies of the Empire of Japan or promoting historically revisionist views of Imperial Japan should be criminalized. According to them, such measures would have the same legitimacy as the criminalization of Neo-Nazism and Holocaust denial in European countries. However, no such legislation has been introduced in South Korea to avoid restricting freedom of speech.

In South Korean politics, liberals and leftists tend to characterize conservatives as "pro-Japan," while conservatives often label liberals and leftists as "pro-Pyongyang" (or Jongbuk). Given South Korea’s history under Japanese colonial rule, being "pro-Japan" is often associated with "fascism" (Korean: 파시스트) or the far right, while being "pro-Pyongyang" is linked to ppalgaengi (Korean: 빨갱이; lit. 'reds') or the far left. As a result, South Korean politicians, particularly liberals, equate Tochak Waegu with the far right.

== Criticism ==
The term Tochak Waegu is primarily a slanderous term directed at South Korean conservatives rather than Japanese people. However, it is sometimes used as a slur against Japanese residents in South Korea. This usage is linked to the perception among South Koreans that Japanese people are perpetrators rather than victims of racism. While some Koreans view the term Waegu as racist against Japanese people, others argue that it is not.

A column in the JoongAng Ilbo, a moderate conservative news outlet, criticized the term Tochak Waegu, comparing it to a liberal version of McCarthyism. This view was challenged by Hong Se-hwa in an article for the left-wing news outlet Hankyoreh, where he argued that the term represents "government-led nationalism" (Korean: 관제 민족주의) rather than left-wing nationalism. He also criticized right-wing Japanese nationalism and what he described as a "hostile symbiosis" between the two nationalisms.

== See also ==
- Chinilpa
- Jjokbari
- New Right (South Korea)
- No Japan Movement
- Anti-Japanese sentiment in Korea
- List of ethnic slurs
- Hate speech
