= D. P. Moran =

Irish journalist and activist (1869–1936)

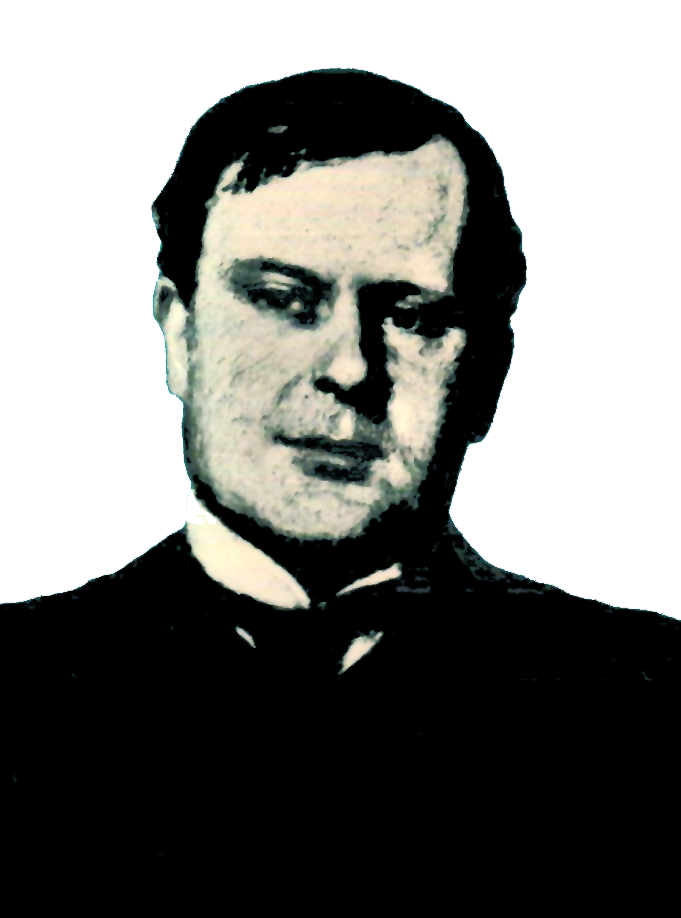
- Born: David Patrick Moran; 22 March 1869; Waterford, Ireland
- Died: 31 January 1936 (aged 66); Skerries, County Dublin, Ireland
- Education: Castleknock College; University of London
- Occupations: Journalist, activist, theorist
- Spouse: Catherine O'Toole
- Writing career
- Pen name: Tom O'Kelly
- Genre: Nationalism
- Notable work: The Philosophy of Irish Ireland
- Literary movement: Celtic Revival

David Patrick Moran (Irish: Dáithí Pádraig Ó Móráin; 22 March 1869 – 31 January 1936), better known as simply D. P. Moran, was an Irish journalist, activist and cultural-political theorist, known as the principal advocate of a specifically Gaelic Catholic Irish nationalism during the early 20th century. Associated with the wider Celtic Revival, he promoted his ideas primarily through his journal, The Leader, and compilations of his articles such as the book The Philosophy of Irish Ireland.

He was born in Manor, a townland in Waterford, the youngest of twenty children born to James Moran, a builder, and Elizabeth (née Casey) Moran. One of his brothers would serve on the defense team of Patrick O'Donnell.

He was educated at Castleknock College, near Dublin before working as a journalist in London, where he was a member of the Irish Literary Society. His brand of nationalism and concept of the decolonisation of Ireland was of a homogeneous Irish-speaking and Roman Catholic nation, promoting the revival of the Irish language and of Gaelic games in Irish cultural life. He often employed disparaging terms ("West Brits", "shoneens", "sourfaces") in reference to Unionists and/or non-Catholics.

== Irish-Ireland ==
Despite the failure of the 1893 Home Rule Bill and the division of the Irish Parliamentary Party in 1891, nationalists took heart from Douglas Hyde's 1892 speech, entitled "The Necessity for De-anglicising Ireland". Moran built upon this thesis and provided a wider ideology for enthusiasts, particularly after the re-unification of most of the nationalist parties from 1900.

In his 1905 text The Philosophy of Irish-Ireland, Moran argued that to be Irish required:

- the use of the Irish language
- membership in the Roman Catholic Church
- an anti-materialist outlook on life
- the playing of only Gaelic games

Though a sponsor of the use of Irish, he never became fluent in the language himself. He emphasised the use of English in 1908–1909 as "an active, vigilant, and merciless propaganda in the English language." In the longer term, when Irish became again the language of the people, its use would enable a de facto censorship of any foreign and unwelcome ideas written in English.

While Moran argued that the idea of 'the Gael' was one that could assimilate others, he also felt that it would be hard if not impossible for members of the Church of Ireland who were Unionists to ever qualify as Irish, being 'resident aliens'. This extended to Anglo-Irish literature. He rejected the Abbey Theatre and questioned Yeats' genius. He once spoke out against the influence Moran claimed Britain exercised over Irish universities, stating: "We are all Palemen Now". In the matter of religious differences, Daniel O'Connell had said in 1826 that 'the [Roman] Catholics of Ireland are a nation'. Moran moved beyond that, affirming in 1901 that '...the Irish Nation is de facto a Catholic nation'. Moran was virulent in his opposition to female suffrage.

== Belfast and Ireland ==
His articles frequently contrasted "Belfast" with "Ireland'", yet hoped that Belfast could eventually change and assimilate. He felt that Ulster unionists should: "... be grateful to the Irish nation for being willing to adopt them". His paper published numerous articles by the future TD Arthur Clery (writing under the pen-name "Chanel"), who advocated partition on the grounds that Ulster unionists were a separate nation, but Moran himself disagreed and: "refused to concede the legitimacy of a northern Protestant identity."

When Irish republicans initiated the Anglo-Irish War in 1919, widescale anti-Catholic rioting broke out in Belfast in 1920 and 1922. Moran identified this as being caused by Orangeism, which he described as "a sore and a cancer" in Ireland. He also alleged that "bigotry on the part of Catholics in the Six Counties is immediately due to Orange bigotry".

== Support for the Treaty ==
Moran was initially a supporter of the Irish Parliamentary Party, believing that the separatism advocated by Arthur Griffith's Sinn Féin was impracticable; however, he opposed John Redmond's support of the British World War I effort.

Moran supported the Anglo-Irish Treaty agreed in 1921–22, and saw the partition of Ireland as beneficial for a truly Irish culture in the Irish Free State. This caused a sea-change in his opinions; from now on Northern Ireland could be safely ignored, along with what he saw as the English evils of 'free thought, free trade, and free literature'. He claimed Irish life and culture had to be protected from foreign influences, including the twin evils of the music hall and the English press. The new jazz music of the 1920s and other imported cultural elements were deprecated as "imported debasement and rot".

== Sources ==
- Maume, Patrick. D. P. Moran (Dublin, Historical Association of Ireland, 1995)
- Mathews, P.J. Revival (Field Day series vol. 12, Cork, 2003) passim; index p. 205 (ISBN 1-85918-365-4)
- Moran, D.P. The Philosophy of Irish Ireland (first published 1905; 2006 reprint by UCD Press with introduction by Patrick Maume)
