= Jackeen =

Pejorative term for someone from Dublin, Ireland

Jackeen is a pejorative term for someone from Dublin, Ireland. The Oxford English Dictionary defines it as a "contemptuous designation for a self-assertive worthless fellow" and cites the earliest documented use from the year 1840.

== Etymology ==
The term Jackeen is believed to be derived from the name Jack, a common English nickname for the names James and John, or in reference to the Union Jack, the flag of the United Kingdom. After the Norman invasion of Ireland began in 1169, Dublin became the centre of the Pale, the part of Ireland directly under the control of the English government in the Late Middle Ages. By the 19th century, Dublin had served as the centre for English rule in Ireland for centuries, and Dubliners were stereotyped as being heavily anglicised and considered the most English people in all of Ireland.

On 17 December 1922, as the final garrison of British soldiers marched towards Dublin Port during the British withdrawal from Ireland, some Dubliners who lined the route bade them farewell and waved Union Jacks.

Jack is combined with the Irish diminutive suffix "-een" (represented as -ín in Irish) meaning little, commonly found in Irish female names such as Roisín ("little Rose") and Maureen (Mairín, "little Mary"), implying that Dubliners are "little Englishmen".

== See also ==
- Culchie
- Shoneen
- West Brit
- Uncle Tom
- Dic Siôn Dafydd
