= Dic Siôn Dafydd =

Pejorative term for Welsh Anglophiles

Lyrics for the 1800 song Plant Dic Sion Dafydd ("The Children of Dic Siôn Dafydd")

Dic Siôn Dafydd ([dɪk ʃoːn ˈdavɨ̞ð], lit."Dick [son of] John [son of] David") is a pejorative term for Welsh people who disdain the culture of Wales and become Anglophiles instead. The term was coined by Welsh poet John Jones in his satirical ballad Cerdd Dic Siôn Dafydd to mock Welsh people who moved to England and adopted its culture in order to ingratiate themselves with the English. It is used today as a political insult.

== History ==
During the late 18th century, Welsh poet John Jones published the satirical ballad Cerdd Dic Siôn Dafydd, following the story of fictional Welshman Dic Siôn Dafydd as he moves to London and begins to disdain the culture of Wales, instead adopting English culture in order to succeed in England. The ballad notes that Dafydd grew up speaking Welsh but becomes pompous after moving to London, insisting on speaking solely English even to his Welsh-speaking mother.

The term Dic Siôn Dafydd has also been used as a political insult in Wales, most commonly to describe a Welsh person perceived as betraying their country for financial and political gain. As an insult, the term has been used to describe Welsh people who become part of the Establishment in Britain while ignoring their Welsh roots. It has also been used to describe Welsh people who only speak English, become Anglophiles or hold Welsh culture in low regard.

== Ballad ==
Gwrandewch ar hanes Dic Siôn Dafydd,
Mab Hafoty'r Mynydd mawr;
A'i daid yn dywedyd bod ei wreiddyn
O hil gethin Albion Gawr.
...
Cymer ofal ar bob adeg
Rhag ofn rhedeg i'r un rhic;
Dyn cymedrol ddeil i fyny;
Cofiwch fel y darfu Dic.

Translation:

Listen to the history of Dic Siôn Dafydd
The son of the farmhouse of the big mountain
His grandfather said that his root
came from the wild race of the Albion giant.
...
Take care at all times
In case you run into the same rut;
The average man is the one that rises;
Remember how Dic came to an end.

== In popular culture ==
The name is also mentioned in the folk song Yma o Hyd:

Er gwaetha pob Dic Siôn Dafydd,
Er gwaetha'r hen Fagi a'i chriw
Byddwn yma hyd ddiwedd amser,
bydd yr iaith Gymraeg yn fyw.
(chorus)
Ry'n ni Yma o Hyd...

Translation:

Despite every Dic Siôn Dafydd,
Despite old Maggie and her crew
We'll be here til the end of time,
The Welsh language will be alive.
(chorus)
We're still here"

Several Welsh poets have written works in the style of Jones' ballad, including Talhaiarn, who published Dammeg Dic Siôn Dafydd yr Ail ("The Parable of Dic Siôn Dafydd the Second") in 1862. During the 1824 National Eisteddfod in Powys, a competition was held where satirical poems following the englyn form were submitted under the predetermined title Beddargraff Dic Siôn Dafydd ("The Epitaph of Dic Siôn Dafydd").

== See also ==
- Acting white – Pejorative term
- Cultural cringe – Feeling of inferiority of one's culture to another
- Cultural relationship between the Welsh and the English
- Crachach – Pejorative for a Welsh-speaking elite
- Jackeen – Pejorative term for someone from Dublin, Ireland
- Self hatred
- Shoneenism – Irish pejorative term for Anglophiles
- Sycophancy – Insincere flattery, once meant a false accuser
- Uncle Tom – Title character of Uncle Tom's Cabin
- West Brit – Pejorative term for an Irish person who admires British customs
