= Diary of a Japanese Military Comfort Station Manager =

Published diary

- Author: Park (first name not disclosed)
- Original title

Korean name
- Hangul: 일본군 위안소 관리인의 일기
- Revised Romanization: Ilbongun Wianso Gwalliinui Ilgi
- McCune–Reischauer: Ilbon'gun Wianso Kwalliinŭi Ilgi
- Translator: An Byeong-jik
- Language: Korean
- Subject: Comfort stations
- Genre: Diary
- Publisher: Esoop (이숲)
- Publication date: August 20, 2013
- Publication place: South Korea
- Pages: 424
- ISBN: 9788994228761

Locations of comfort stations in Burma mentioned in the diary

Diary of a Japanese Military Comfort Station Manager is a book of diaries written by a clerk who worked in Japanese "comfort stations", where the Japanese military trafficked women and girls into sexual slavery, in Burma and Singapore during World War II. The author, a Korean businessman, kept a daily diary between 1922 and 1957. The diaries were discovered by historian An Byeong-jik in 2012 and published in South Korea in 2013.

The Diary of a Japanese Military Comfort Station Manager is regarded as a credible contemporary document on the workings of Japan's comfort women system. The diary sheds light on the lives of women who worked in "comfort stations" and the relationship between comfort station managers and the Japanese military.

== Background ==
The author of the diary is identified only by the surname Park. Mr. Park was born near Gimhae, South Gyeongsang Province, in 1905 and died in 1979. After graduating from high school in 1922, he kept a diary which he updated every day until 1957. When Korea was part of the Japanese Empire, Mr. Park ran a scriveners' office and at first enjoyed a well-to-do lifestyle. However, in 1940, when his profits declined, he put a substantial portion of his remaining wealth into a plan to build a restaurant in Manchuria, which turned out to be an investment scam. At this time, Mr. Park's brother-in-law was involved in recruiting Korean comfort women and sending them overseas to provide sexual services to Japanese soldiers. Partly because of his financial difficulties, Mr. Park decided in 1942 to travel to Japanese-occupied Southeast Asia with his brother-in-law to manage a comfort station, and he stayed there until 1944.

After Mr. Park's death, parts of his diary found their way to a used bookstore. Oh Chae-hyeon, a sculptor, purchased them and took them to the Time Capsule Museum in Paju, a privately owned museum where he served as curator. In May 2012, Korean historian An Byeong-jik, Professor Emeritus at Seoul National University, learned of the existence of the diary from an archivist at the Academy of Korean Studies and borrowed its 26 volumes from the Time Capsule Museum with permission from Oh. The diary entries for the years 1943 and 1944 were examined by An jointly with two Japanese researchers, Kyoto University professor Hori Kazuo and Kobe University professor Kimura Kan. These 1943-44 entries, written in a mix of older Korean and Japanese, were translated entirely into modern Korean by the Naksungdae Institute of Economic Research and then into modern Japanese by Hori and Kimura.

== Contents of the diary ==
The diary is written in a mixture of Japanese characters (kanji and katakana) and the Korean alphabet. Each diary entry starts with the date, followed by a description of the weather, including the daily minimum and maximum temperatures in degrees Celsius, and then an account of the author's daily activities. It is unclear whether Mr. Park intended the diary to be a simple chronicle of his day-to-day activities and thoughts, as a record of his business transactions, or both.

Although diary entries from 1942 are missing, it is known that Mr. Park arrived in Burma on August 20, 1942, and ran a comfort station called the Kanpachi Club in modern-day Sittwe until January 16, 1943. He subsequently managed a comfort station called Ichifuji-rō in Insein, Rangoon, from May 1, 1943, to September 9, 1943, before moving to Singapore on September 29, 1943, where he worked with a taxi company. On February 1, 1944, he started work at a comfort station called "Kikusui Club", which he continued to manage until December 16, 1944, when he left for home. The published version of his diary includes all his diary entries between January 1, 1943, and December 31, 1944.

Mr. Park's daily responsibilities were to man the front desk at the station between around 2:00 PM and 1:00 AM, to take the guests to the comfort women's rooms and to record all profits and expenditures. The comfort stations were set up in existing buildings in civilian areas, rather than in segregated red-light districts. Some of Mr. Park's other frequent responsibilities included shopping for daily goods, collecting and distributing rations, maintaining his car, and attending air raid watches. Mr. Park was in constant contact with the Japanese military authorities to submit reports on his business and to obtain entry permits, employment permits, and travel papers for the comfort women and himself.

According to the diary, the comfort women sometimes received leaves of absence if they became pregnant, regular examinations for sexually transmitted infections, and medical care. Some could leave the stations and return home after receiving permission from the Japanese military; others were compelled to stay because they could not receive permission or because the conditions of the war had deteriorated.

Some comfort women had individual savings accounts for their earnings and tips. On nine occasions over the course of a year, Mr. Park deposited money on to Japanese bank accounts on behalf of comfort women and other "working women."

The diary notes that many comfort stations in Burma and Singapore were operated by Koreans, though others were operated by Japanese or by locals. Mr. Park mentions that many of his fellow Korean comfort station managers also owned a diverse range of other investments throughout Asia, including cafeterias, factories, and confectionaries in places like Indonesia, Malaysia, and Thailand. Though Mr. Park was often nostalgic for his Korean hometown, his business did allow him to live a comfortable life while overseas and he spent lavishly on clothing, shoes, and watches for himself. He also made investments in restaurants and oil refineries in partnership with his fellow Korean comfort station managers.

== Reception and debate ==
The Naksungdae Institute of Economic Research including Professor An Byeong-jik translated the diary into modern Korean and had it published in August 2013. Researchers have hailed the diary as a crucial source of information on the workings of Japan's comfort women system. It is in fact the only known contemporary account of the comfort women system written by a comfort station manager. According to Kan Kimura, the diary is "highly credible", noting that Mr. Park died before the comfort women issue became a source of tension between Japan and South Korea. The comfort women issue did not become a significant international problem until 1990, when a group of former Korean comfort women asked for an apology and compensation from the Japanese government.

According to The Japan Times, Mr. Park's accounts "conflict with assertions by some Japanese that comfort women were involved in a purely private business, and by some South Koreans that the women were completely enslaved." However, historians have interpreted parts of the diary in different ways.

According to An Byeong-jik, the diary provides clear evidence that the military comfort stations were established in a regulated fashion and fully controlled by the Japanese military, rather than being private outfits. In the diary, Mr. Park stated that he left Korea in 1942 as part of the "fourth comfort corps", the existence of which is confirmed in a US research report written in November 1945. The "fourth comfort corps" appears to have been organized and administered by the Japanese military. Furthermore, the diary states that Mr. Park frequently traveled between cities with Japanese soldiers in military-use vehicles and ships, and that he had to provide the Japanese military with regular work reports. According to An, this suggests that comfort station owners were employees of the military.

On the other hand, Choi Kilsong, a Korean historian and Professor Emeritus at Hiroshima University, came to the opposite conclusion about the diary. Choi points out that Mr. Park paid dues to and attended regular meetings of the "Military Comfort Station Association", which appears to have been an independent guild of comfort station owners similar to those which existed in the Korean prostitution industry at the time. The military comfort stations moved with the military unit they served, but according to Choi, it is unclear if the military ordered these transfers or if comfort stations moved, completely on their own accord, with their clients. Though Mr. Park frequently hitched rides on military vehicles and received permission to spend the night at military facilities during transfers, he just as frequently wrote about having to use private transportation or having to spend the night at the homes of friends. Choi calls attention to one entry in which Mr. Park declined to have a meal at a restaurant upon being told that it served only soldiers and military employees. In contrast with Professor An, Professor Choi concludes that Mr. Park was not a military employee and that the military comfort stations were essentially run as private businesses. However, Choi does agree that these businesses operated closely with the Japanese military.

Concerning the controversy over whether the comfort women should be described as "sex slaves", Choi Kilsong notes that the diary refers to the comfort women as "barmaids" or "workwomen". Choi believes that the comfort women were not sex slaves, but rather were more similar to the karayuki-san, Japanese prostitutes who plied their trade abroad. By contrast, Professor An points to a diary entry showing that the comfort women were forced to transfer to new work sites along with the Japanese Army regardless of their own wishes, and to one entry which states that two comfort women in Burma attempted to quit their jobs and return home but were forced by the Japanese military to continue working. An concludes that "sexual slavery" is a reasonable description of the comfort women system.

When the diary was first published, many South Korean media outlets reported that the diary was definitive evidence that Korean comfort women were forcibly recruited by the Japanese military, but Choi Kilsong dismissed the notion that the diary supports this. An Byeong-jik concurs that the diary contains no information concerning forcible recruitment of comfort women, stating that, "Comfort women were recruited by business operators in Korea, and there was no need for the military to abduct them." However, the diary entries of the year 1942, which might have dealt in more detail with how the comfort women at Mr. Park's comfort station were recruited, are missing from the diary.

== Release details ==
- 일본군 위안소 관리인의 일기 [Diary of a Japanese Military Comfort Station Manager]. Translated by Byeong-jik, An. Esoope. August 20, 2013. ISBN 9788994228761. Archived from the original on December 25, 2014.
- ビルマ・シンガポールの従軍慰安所 (日本語仮訳) [Military Comfort Station in Burma and Singapore (A Provisional Japanese Translation)]. Translated by Kazuo, Hori; Kan, Kimura. Naksungdae Institute of Economic Research. August 1, 2013. alternate link
- "Excerpt from Diary of a Japanese Military Comfort Station Manager". Translated by Yoshio, Haraguchi. July 20, 2018.

== See also ==
- United States military and prostitution in South Korea
- Recreation and Amusement Association: Prostitutes in Japan for the U.S. military
- Nazi War Crimes and Japanese Imperial Government Records Interagency Working Group: Investigation of comfort women from 2002 to 2007.
