= Kan Kimura =

Japanese political scientist (born 1966)

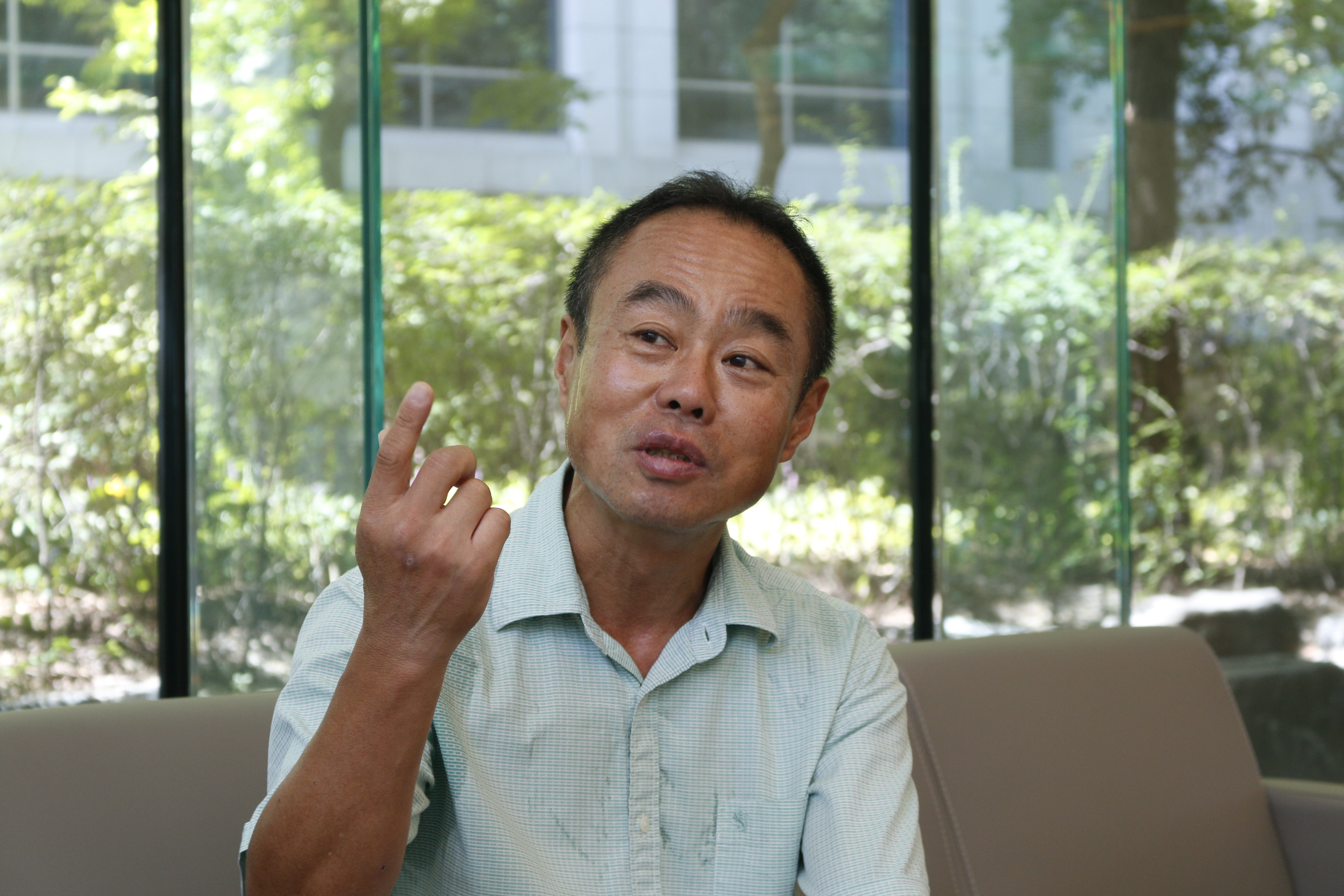
Kan Kimura in Seoul, September 2025

Kan Kimura (Japanese: 木村 幹, Kimura Kan; born 7 April 1966) is a Japanese political scientist specializing in South Korean politics, comparative politics, nationalism, democratization, political culture, historical memory, and Japan–South Korea relations. He is professor at the Graduate School of International Cooperation Studies, Kobe University.

Kimura is known for his studies of Korean nationalism, authoritarianism, democratization, historical memory, and historical disputes between Japan and South Korea. His books have received the Special Prize of the Asian and Pacific Prize, the Suntory Prize for Social Sciences and Humanities, and the Yomiuri–Yoshino Sakuzo Prize.

In addition to academic writing, Kimura has written extensively for general audiences on Korea, Japan–South Korea relations, higher education, and Japanese public life. He has contributed essays and columns to outlets including Newsweek Japan, Bunshun Online, and Nikkei.

== Early life and education ==
Kimura was born in Higashiosaka, Osaka Prefecture, Japan. He studied at Kyoto University, receiving an LL.B. from the Faculty of Law in 1990 and an LL.M. from the Graduate School of Law in 1992. He withdrew from the doctoral program in 1993 and later received a Doctor of Laws degree from Kyoto University in 2001.

His doctoral research formed the basis of his first major book, Chosen/Kankoku Nashonarizumu to "Shokoku" Ishiki (Korean Nationalism and the Consciousness of a Small Nation), a study of Korean nationalism and the historical formation of national identity.

== Academic career ==
Kimura began his academic career at Ehime University, where he served as Research Associate at the Faculty of Law and Letters from 1993 to 1994 and Lecturer from 1994 to 1997.

In 1997, he joined Kobe University as Associate Professor in the Graduate School of International Cooperation Studies. He was promoted to Professor in 2005.

At Kobe University, Kimura has also held several administrative positions. He served as Director of the Center for Asian Academic Collaboration from 2017 to 2021. He later served as Dean of the Graduate School of International Cooperation Studies from 2023 to 2025 and Vice Dean from 2025 to 2026.

Kimura has held visiting and research appointments at a number of overseas institutions. He was a research fellow of the Korea Foundation from 1996 to 1997, visiting scholar at the Fairbank Center for East Asian Research at Harvard University from 1998 to 1999, visiting scholar at the Asiatic Research Institute of Korea University in 2001, visiting scholar at the Sejong Institute in 2006, visiting scholar at the College of Asia and the Pacific of the Australian National University in 2008, visiting scholar at the Henry M. Jackson School of International Studies at the University of Washington from 2010 to 2011, and visiting professor at the Graduate School of International Studies of Korea University in 2014. In 2025, he was also affiliated as a visiting scholar with Seoul National University and Yonsei University.

== Research ==
Kimura's research examines the relationship between nationalism, ideology, political culture, modernization, and democratization in Korea and East Asia. His early work focused on Korean nationalism and the transformation of Korea from a tributary polity into a modern nation-state. He later examined the formation of authoritarian political institutions under Syngman Rhee and opposition politics under Park Chung-hee.

A major theme in Kimura's work is the role of historical memory in Japan–South Korea relations. He has written on history textbook disputes, the comfort women issue, colonial memory, and the political dynamics through which historical disputes become internationalized.

Kimura's later research has addressed South Korean democracy, populism, anti-communism, identity politics, political communication, and contemporary East Asian international relations. His work combines comparative politics with area studies, with particular emphasis on South Korean political development and Japan–South Korea relations.

== Academic service ==
Kimura has been active in academic associations related to Korean studies, East Asian history, and comparative politics. He has served as director of the Association for Contemporary Korean Studies in Japan since 2000 and as director of the Japanese Association of Modern East Asian Studies since 1996. Within the Association for Contemporary Korean Studies in Japan, he served as editorial committee chair, planning committee chair, vice president, and later president.

He also participated in the First and Second Japan–Korea Joint History Research Projects, which were established through agreements between the governments of Japan and South Korea.

== Teaching and mentorship ==
Kimura has supervised numerous graduate students who later pursued academic, research, media, and policy-related careers. By the mid-2020s, more than a dozen of his former students had obtained positions at universities and research institutions in Japan and abroad.

His students' research areas include Korean politics, nationalism, comparative politics, public administration, local governance, development assistance, migration, multicultural studies, Southeast Asian politics, security studies, media studies, tourism studies, and public policy.

== Public engagement ==
Kimura is also known as a public commentator on Korea, Japan–South Korea relations, and higher education. He has written for general audiences in books, newspaper columns, magazine essays, and online media.

He is a regular contributor to Newsweek Japan, where he writes on Korean politics, South Korean society, North Korea, Japan–South Korea relations, and East Asian affairs.

He has also contributed to Bunshun Online, including essays on Korean affairs, university life, higher education, and professional baseball. His Bunshun Online author page lists a series of baseball columns, many of them concerning the Orix Buffaloes.

Kimura's 2025 book Kokuritsu Daigaku Kyoju no Oshigoto: Toaru Bukyokucho no Honne (The Work of a National University Professor: The Real Thoughts of a Department Head) discusses university administration, academic labor, and the everyday work of faculty members at Japanese national universities.

== Personal interests ==
Kimura is known as a long-time supporter of the Orix Buffaloes. He has written numerous essays on the team, including columns for Bunshun Online and other Japanese media.

He is also an avid road cyclist. His publicly available activity log on Komoot records long-distance cycling activities, including years in which the recorded total distance exceeded 6,000 km.

== Honors and awards ==
- 2001 – Special Prize, 13th Asian and Pacific Prize, for Chosen/Kankoku Nashonarizumu to "Shokoku" Ishiki.
- 2003 – Suntory Prize for Social Sciences and Humanities, for Kankoku ni okeru "Kenishugiteki" Taisei no Seiritsu.
- 2015 – Yomiuri–Yoshino Sakuzo Prize, for Nikkan Rekishi Ninshiki Mondai to wa Nanika.

== Selected works ==
=== Academic monographs ===
- Chosen/Kankoku Nashonarizumu to "Shokoku" Ishiki: Chokokoku kara Kokumin Kokka e (Korean Nationalism and the Consciousness of a Small Nation: From Tributary State to Nation-State), Minerva Shobo, 2000.
- Kankoku ni okeru "Kenishugiteki" Taisei no Seiritsu: Lee Syngman Seiken no Hokai made (The Formation of an Authoritarian Regime in South Korea: Until the Collapse of the Syngman Rhee Regime), Minerva Shobo, 2003.
- Chosen Hanto o Do Miru ka (How to Understand the Korean Peninsula), Shueisha, 2004.
- Koso, Minhi: Shikaraba Itashikata Nashi (King Gojong and Queen Min), Minerva Shobo, 2007.
- Minshuka no Kankoku Seiji: Park Chung-hee to Yato Seijikatachi, 1961–1979 (Democratization in South Korean Politics: Park Chung-hee and Opposition Politicians, 1961–1979), Nagoya University Press, 2008.
- Kankoku Gendaishi: Daitoryotachi no Eiko to Satetsu (Modern History of South Korea: The Glory and Frustration of Presidents), Chuokoron-Shinsha, 2008.
- Kindai Kankoku no Nashonarizumu (Modern Korean Nationalism), Nakanishiya Shuppan, 2009.
- Nikkan Rekishi Ninshiki Mondai to wa Nanika: Rekishi Kyokasho, Ianfu, Populism (What Is the Japan–South Korea Historical Perception Problem? History Textbooks, Comfort Women, and Populism), Minerva Shobo, 2014.
- The Burden of the Past: Problems of Historical Perception in Japan–Korea Relations, University of Michigan Press, 2019.
- Rekishi Ninshiki wa Do Katararete Kita ka (How Historical Perceptions Have Been Discussed), Chikura Shobo, 2020.
- Heisei Jidai no Nikkan Kankei (Japan–South Korea Relations in the Heisei Era), Minerva Shobo, 2020.
- Chun Doo-hwan, Minerva Shobo, 2024.

=== Books for general readers ===
- Kankoku Aizo: Gekihen-suru Ringoku to Watashi no 30 Nen (Korea and I: Thirty Years with a Rapidly Changing Neighbor), Chuokoron-Shinsha, 2022.
- Gokai Shinai Tame no Nikkan Kankei Kogi (Lectures on Japan–South Korea Relations for Avoiding Misunderstanding), PHP Institute, 2022.
- Kokuritsu Daigaku Kyoju no Oshigoto: Toaru Bukyokucho no Honne (The Work of a National University Professor: The Real Thoughts of a Department Head), Chikumashobo, 2025.

=== Edited and co-authored works ===
- Minshuka to Nashonarizumu no Genchiten (Democratization and Nationalism in the Contemporary World), co-edited with Yoshifumi Tamada, Minerva Shobo, 2006.
- Posuto Kanryu no Media Shakaigaku (Media Sociology after the Korean Wave), co-edited with Saeko Ishita and Chie Yamanaka, Minerva Shobo, 2007.
- Populism, Democracy and Political Leadership, co-edited with Yukinori Shimada, Minerva Shobo, 2009.
- Tettei Kensho Kankokuron no Tsusetsu Zokusetsu (A Critical Examination of Common Views and Myths about Korea), co-authored with Yuki Asaba and Daisuke Sato, Chuokoron-Shinsha, 2012.

== Selected English-language articles ==
- "Why Did the Chosun Dynasty Fail to Modernize?: 'Modernization from Above' in Korea", Political Science in Asia, 2006.
- "Nationalistic Populism in Democratic Countries of East Asia", Journal of Korean Politics, 2007.
- "How Can We Cope with Historical Disputes? The Japanese and South Korean Experience", in Marie Söderberg, ed., Changing Power Relations in Northeast Asia, Routledge, 2010.
- "Discovery of Disputes: Collective Memories on Textbooks and Japanese–South Korean Relations", Journal of Korean Studies, 2012.
- "Discourses About Comfort Women in Japan, South Korea, and International Society", International Relations and Diplomacy, 2015.
- "Betraying Democratization?: Media Narratives, Mass Protest and Presidential Impeachment in South Korea", Journal of International Cooperation Studies, 2020.
- "Japan-China 2008 Agreement: Common-Pool Resource Governance Problem", with Rafyoga Jehan Pratama Irsadanar, Jurnal Studi Pemerintahan, 2021.
- "The ideational implications of Japan–Indonesia maritime security cooperation: trust, capacity building, and shared values", with Rafyoga Jehan and Pratama Irsadanara, Asian Journal of Political Science, 2026.

== See also ==
- Korean studies
- Comparative politics
- Japan–South Korea relations
- Historical revisionism
- Nationalism
