= An Byeong-jik =

South Korean historian (born 1936)

- Hangul: 안병직
- Hanja: 安秉直
- RR: An Byeongjik
- MR: An Pyŏngjik

An Byeong-jik (born 1936) or Ahn Byong-jick is a Professor Emeritus at Seoul National University and a co-founder of the Naksungdae Institute of Economic Research. He is the representative director of the New Right Foundation. His research focuses on economic history during the Korea under Japanese rule.

He disclosed a diary by a manager of World War II Japanese military brothels and published Diary of a Japanese Military Brothel Manager in 2013.

== Academic career ==
An was born in Haman in 1936. He graduated from the Department of Economics of Seoul University with a master's degree in economics. He became a professor of Seoul National University College of Social Sciences. He was appointed a professor emeritus at Seoul National University in 2001.

== Works ==
- 일본군 위안소 관리인의 일기 [Diary of a Japanese military brothel manager]] (in Korean). Translated by An Byeong-jik. Esoope. 2013. ISBN 9788994228761. Archived from the original on 2014-12-25.
  - "日本軍慰安所管理人の日記" [Diary of a Japanese military brothel manager] (in Japanese). Naksungdae Institute of Economic Research. August 30, 2013.

== See also ==
- New Right (South Korea)
- Park Yu-ha
- Lee Young-hoon
