= Park Yu-ha =

South Korean academic (born 1957)

- Hangul: 박유하
- Hanja: 朴裕河
- RR: Bak Yuha
- MR: Pak Yuha

Park Yu-ha (Korean: 박유하; born March 25, 1957) is a professor at the College of Liberal Arts, Sejong University. Her research focuses on Japanese–Korean relations. Her 2013 book Comfort Women of the Empire criticized the Korean interpretation of comfort women as exclusively "sex slaves."

== Academic career ==
Park graduated from Keio University in 1981. She earned an M.A. from Waseda University in 1989 and a Ph.D. in 1993.

== Comfort Women of the Empire ==
=== Synopsis ===
In her book Comfort Women of the Empire, Park challenged an established description of imperial Japan's military comfort station system. She describes a more complex relationship between the comfort women and soldiers.

Park says requesting Japan take legal responsibility is not effective, considering the colonial status of Korea and the existence of the Treaty on Basic Relations between Japan and the Republic of Korea, and criticizes Jong-Dae-Hyup, (정대협, the main comfort women supporting NGO in South Korea) which has focused on the legal responsibility of Japan. Furthermore, excluding other comfort women's stories which do not fit into the pre-existing image of "pure innocent teen girls who were arrested by Japanese soldiers and coerced to be sex-slaves" is actually suppressing the real victims and makes the victim groups separated.

Therefore, considering the historical situation, the Treaty on Basic Relations between Japan and the Republic of Korea in 1965, and the apology and compensation of Japan in the 1990s, Park claims that requesting responsibility for Japan's colonial domination is required, rather than trying to urge Japan to accept legal liability for the War.

While she does state that Korea must face the truth correctly in order to hold Japan properly responsible for its offences, she also criticizes Japan at the same time, for the rightwing extremists in Japan excuse their responsibility by the treaty between Japan and Korea in 1965 and the compensation in 1990. While Park acknowledges the treaty in 1965, she avers that Japan took legal responsibilities only for the individuals as per the necessary process after the War, and also, she censures the compensation of 1990 for failing to be disseminated throughout Korea due to the Japanese government’s ambiguous attitude.

Park argues that Japan should apologize for their actions of colonial domination and the case for the Korean comfort women, both due to international significance and to allow for the opportunity of Asian integration or co-operation in the near future.

=== Controversy ===
Park's book Comfort Women of the Empire contains a significantly different narrative about comfort women compared to the previously accepted narratives, as it describes in depth the imperialistic exploits by Japan, the patriarchal system in Korea and also the capitalistic exploits of the "dealers". This explanation brought fierce anger from the comfort women supporters since her explanation was analyzed as "virtually an exoneration to Japan" by the critics. Chong Yung-hwan, Professor at the Meiji Gakuin University criticized Comfort Women of the Empire for misinterpreting and distorting basic sources and previous research and advocating colonialism. Nine former comfort women in Nanume-Jip (나눔의 집), seeking to ban sales of the book, filed suit in both civil and criminal court, claiming that the scholar had defamed them. She was asked to pay 10 million won, or $8,262, to each of nine women. She was also accused by a Korean prosecutor.

On 25 November 2015, against the indictment of Park, 54 Japanese scholars and intellectuals including Kenzaburō Ōe (大江 健三郎, Nobel Laureate), (Note: Elsewhere, Ōe has criticized the Japanese government for not adequately acknowledging or apologizing for comfort women.) Tomiichi Murayama (村山 富市, former Prime minister of Japan), Yōhei Kōno (河野 洋平, former Minister of Foreign Affairs of Japan) and Chizuko Ueno (上野 千鶴子, professor, Tokyo University) addressed statements supporting Park Yu-ha, and asking for the Korean government's withdrawal of the accusation and criticizing South Korean prosecutors for “suppressing the freedom of scholarship and press.” 190 Korean intellectuals also followed the statements. On January 17, 2017, Professor Noam Chomsky at MIT and Professor Bruce Cumings at University of Chicago joined in the previous statements addressed by Japanese scholars previously, with requesting immediate withdrawal of presecusion or sentence 'Not guilty', with supporting Park Yu-ha.

On January 25, 2017, the 11th criminal division of Seoul Dongbu District Court acquitted Park on the defamation charges. The court said "no circumstances were confirmed to indicate that standard research ethics were violated or that the dignity of victims was belittled, such as infringing on their right to self-determination and freedom of privacy and confidentiality."

== Works ==
- Comfort Women of the Japanese Empire: Colonial Rule and Battle over Memory”Park, Yuha. Routledge. 2024 English edition
- 제국의 위안부 - 식민지지배와 기억의 투쟁 [Comfort women of the empire: the battle over colonial rule and memory] (PDF) (in Korean). 뿌리와이파리 [Ppuliwaipali]. 2013. ISBN 9788964620304.
- 帝国の慰安婦 植民地支配と記憶の闘い [Comfort women of the empire: the battle over colonial rule and memory] (in Japanese). 朝日新聞出版 [Asahi Shimbun Publications Inc.] 2014. ISBN 9784022511737.
  - An English summary by author. March 28, 2015
  - [Book Review] Genichiro Takahashi (December 24, 2014). "POINT OF VIEW/ Genichiro Takahashi: 'Comfort women' denied ownership of their memories". The Asahi Shimbun. Archived from the original on 2016-03-04.
  - [Book Review] "Japan Political Pulse: South Korean's cool take on 'comfort women' issue under attack at home, delayed in Japan". Mainichi Shimbun. September 1, 2014. Archived from the original on 2015-07-03.
- 화해를 위해서 - 교과서.위안부.야스쿠니.독도 [For reconciliation: Textbook, Comfort women, Yasukuni shrine and Liancourt Rocks] (in Korean). Ban-yangjangbon. 2005. ISBN 9788990024466.
- 和解のために−教科書・慰安婦・靖国・独島 [For reconciliation: Textbook, Comfort women, Yasukuni shrine and Liancourt Rocks] (in Japanese). Heibonsha Ltd, Pub. 2006. ISBN 9784582702651.
  - Chapter of Comfort Women (in Korean)
  - [Book Review] "Power to forgive key to Japan-South Korean reconciliation". Mainichi Shimbun. March 1, 2014. Archived from the original on 2014-12-25.

== See also ==
- An Byeong-jik
- Lee Young-hoon
- Diary of a Japanese military brothel manager
