= Lee Young-hoon =

South Korean academic (born 1951)

- Hangul: 이영훈
- Hanja: 李榮薰
- RR: I Yeonghun
- MR: I Yŏnghun

Lee Young-hoon (Korean: 이영훈, born 1951), Lee Yong-hoon, Rhee Yong-hoon, or Yi Yŏnghun is a South Korean former professor of economics at Seoul National University and the president of the Naksungdae Institute of Economic Research (낙성대경제연구소).

He is a member and co-representative of the Textbook Forum of the New Right Party. He is known for undertaking new positivistic research on the Economy of Joseon.

Lee was born in Daegu, South Korea.

== Career ==
Lee graduated from the Department of Economics at Seoul National University and earned a Doctor of Economics degree. He held positions as an associate professor of economics at Hanshin University and a professor at Sungkyunkwan University. In recognition of his achievements, he was awarded the Kyung-Ahm Prize in 2013.

Lee Young-hoon published a book entitled Anti-Japan Tribalism. The book suggests that a shamanistic mindset exists among a small minority of South Koreans, which views Japan as a primary adversary. According to the authors, this perspective has contributed to the development of certain anti-Japan arguments within South Korean society. The book has been criticized by South Korean historians for its historical distortions as well as its political bias, as many of its authors were associated with the New Right (South Korea).

Lee challenged the mistreatment of Korea during Japanese colonial rule and development. He put forth the argument that the number of comfort women, who are regarded as sex slaves in South Korea, as well as forced laborers, had been exaggerated in Korean textbooks. His doubts about the forcible transportation of comfort women by the Governor-General of Korea led to criticism from within South Korea.

== Works ==
- Rhee, Young Hoon (2004). 수량경제사로 다시 본 조선후기 [A Cliometric Review of Late Chosŏn History]. Seoul National University Press. ISBN 9788952105417.
- Rhee, Young Hoon (2007). 대한민국 이야기'해방전후사의 재인식' 강의 [Story of Republic of Korea, Lectures on "Re-acknowledging before and after the liberation"] (in Korean). 기파랑 [Guiparang]. ISBN 978-8991965607.
- Lee, Young-hoon; et al. (July 2019). 반일 종족주의 : 대한민국 위기의 근원 [Anti-Japan Tribalism: the root of the Korean crisis]. 미래사 (Milaesa).
- Lee, Young-hoon; et al. (May 2020). 반일 종족주의와의 투쟁 [The struggle against anti-Japan Tribalism]. 미래사 (Milaesa).
- Anti-Japan Tribalism: (2024)The Root of the Korean Crisis”Lee, Yong-hoon. PacRim Marketing Group Inc. English

== See also ==
- New Right (South Korea)
- An Byeong-jik
- Park Yu-ha
- Kim Wan-seop
