= Shoneenism =

Irish pejorative term for Anglophiles

Shoneenism is a pejorative term, used in Ireland from at least the 18th century, to describe Irish people who are viewed as engaging in excessive Anglophilia or snobbery. Some late 19th and early 20th century Irish nationalist writers, like D. P. Moran (1869–1936), used the term shoneen (Irish: Seoinín), alongside the term West Brit, to characterize those who were snobbish, expressed admiration for England or copied English customs. A stereotypical shoneen also reputedly shows corresponding disdain for Irish nationalism and the culture of Ireland, such as the Irish language and Irish traditional music.

== History and use ==
Since the 1800s, the words shoneen and shoneenism have been used by Irish nationalists as terms of derision and are always uncomplimentary towards the shoneen as the Irish language diminutive ending een (ín) when used in this manner has a loading of contempt. One suggested etymology of shoneen is seoinín, meaning "Little John" in Irish, referring to John Bull, a national personification of the British Empire in general and of England in particular. The following lines were published in 1882, under the pseudonym Artane:

There is not in this wide world a creature so mean,
As that mongrel of mongrels, the Irish shoneen!

Published in 1910, Patrick Weston Joyce's work English as We Speak it in Ireland, defines a "shoneen" as "a gentleman in a small way: a would-be gentleman who puts on superior airs", noting that the word is always "used contemptuously".

James Joyce uses the term in several of his works, a practice which some Joycean scholars attribute to the frequent use of the term by Irish nationalist journalist D. P. Moran in The Leader newspaper. In Writers and Politics: Essays and Criticism, a series of essays published by Conor Cruise O'Brien in 1965, O'Brien noted that advocates of a particular form of Irish nationalism, including D. P. Moran, would describe those who were deemed not to be an "Irish Islander" as either "a West Briton, if of Anglo-Irish descent, or a shoneen if of Gaelic ancestry".

The Irish historian and academic, F. S. L. Lyons, defined a "shoneen" as a person "of native Irish stock who committed the unforgivable sin of aping English or West-Briton manners and attitudes".

In 2017, the Irish Court of Appeal's judge Gerard Hogan reportedly described a preference in legal circles to refer to the European Convention of Human Rights, instead of the Constitution of Ireland, as a "sort of legal shoneenism".

== See also ==
- Acting white
- Colonial mentality
- Cultural cringe
- Dic Siôn Dafydd
- Jackeen
- Sycophancy
- Uncle Tom
- Sadae
