= West Brit =

Pejorative term for an Irish person who admires British customs

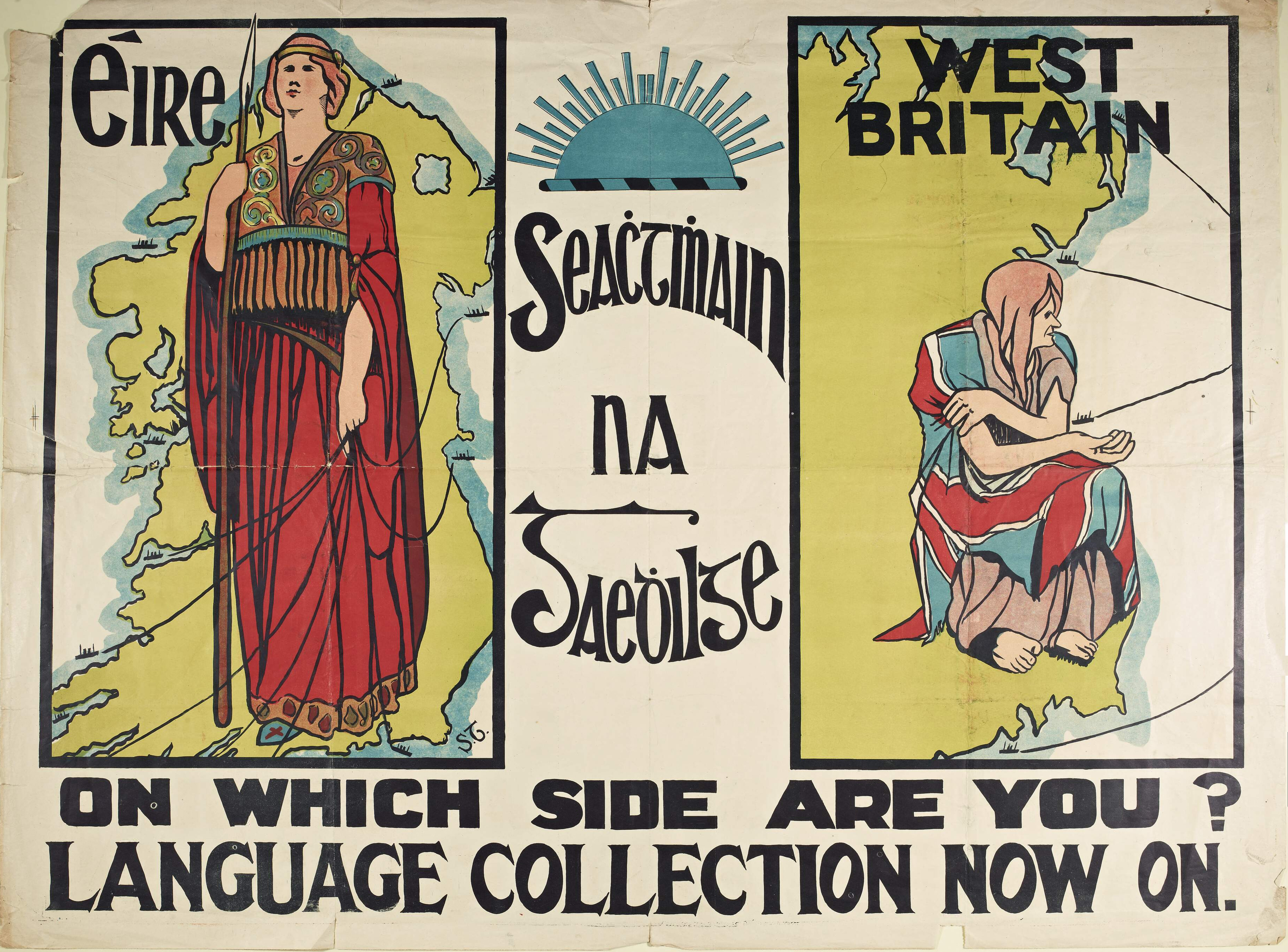
Gaelic League poster from 1913 contrasting a proud, independent Éire with a craven, dependent West Britain

West Brit, an abbreviation of West Briton, is a derogatory term for an Irish person who is perceived as Anglophilic in matters of culture or politics. West Britain is a description of Ireland emphasising it as subject to British influence.

== History ==
"West Britain" was used with reference to the Acts of Union 1800 which united the Kingdom of Great Britain and the Kingdom of Ireland into the United Kingdom of Great Britain and Ireland. Similarly "North Britain" for Scotland used after the 1603 Union of the Crowns and the Acts of Union 1707 connected it to the Kingdom of England ("South Britain"). In 1800 Thomas Grady, a Limerick unionist, published a collection of light verse named The West Briton, while an anti-union cartoon depicted an official offering bribes and proclaiming "God save the King & his Majesty's subjects of west Britain that is to be!" In 1801 the Latin description of George III on the Great Seal of the Realm was changed from MAGNÆ BRITANNIÆ FRANCIÆ ET HIBERNIÆ REX, "Of Great Britain, France and Ireland King", to BRITANNIARUM REX, "Of the Britains King", ending the claim to the French throne and describing Great Britain and Ireland as "the Britains".

Irish unionist MP Thomas Spring Rice (later Lord Monteagle of Brandon) said on 23 April 1834 in the House of Commons in opposing Daniel O'Connell's motion for Repeal of the Union, "I should prefer the name of West Britain to that of Ireland". Rice was derided by Henry Grattan later in the same debate: "He tells us, that he belongs to England, and designates himself as a West Briton." Daniel O'Connell himself used the phrase at a pro-Repeal speech in Dublin in February 1836:

The people of Ireland are ready to become a portion of the empire, provided they be made so in reality and not in name alone; they are ready to become a kind of West Britons, if made so in benefits and justice; but if not, we are Irishmen again.

Here, O'Connell was hoping that Ireland would soon become as prosperous as "North Britain" had become after 1707, but supposed that if the Union did not deliver this, then some type of Irish home rule was essential. The Dublin administration as performed during the 1830s was intermediate between these two possibilities.

The term "West Briton" became used next pejoratively during the land struggle of the 1880s. D. P. Moran, who founded the publication The Leader in 1900, used the term frequently to describe those who he did not consider sufficiently Irish. It was synonymous with those he described as "Sourfaces", who had mourned the death of the Queen Victoria in 1901. It included virtually all Church of Ireland Protestants and those Catholics who did not measure up to his definition of "Irish Irelanders".

In 1907, Canon R. S. Ross-Lewin published a collection of loyal Irish poems using the pseudonym "A County of Clare West Briton", explaining the epithet in the foreword:

Now, what is the exact definition and up-to-date meaning of that term? The holder of the title may be descended from O'Connors and O'Donelans and ancient Irish Kings. He may have the greatest love for his native land, desirous to learn the Irish language, and under certain conditions to join the Gaelic League. He may be all this, and rejoice in the victory of an Irish horse in the "Grand National", or an Irish dog at "Waterloo", or an Irish tug-of-war team of R.I.C. giants at Glasgow or Liverpool, but, if he does not at the same time hate the mere Saxon, and revel in the oft resuscitated pictures of long past periods, and the horrors of the penal laws he is a mere "West Briton", his Irish blood, his Irish sympathies go for nothing. He misses the chief qualifications to the ranks of the "Irish best", if he remains an imperialist, and sees no prospect of peace or happiness or return of prosperity in the event of the Union being severed. In this sense, Lord Roberts, Lord Charles Beresford and hundreds of others, of whom all Irishmen ought to be proud, are "West Britons", and thousands who have done nothing for the empire, under the just laws of which they live, who, perhaps, are mere descendants of Cromwell's soldiers, and even of Saxon lineage, with very little Celtic blood in their veins, are of the "Irish best".

Ernest Augustus Boyd's 1924 collection Portraits: real and imaginary included "A West Briton", which gave a table of West-Briton responses to certain words:

Word	Response
Sinn Féin	Pro-German
Irish	Vulgar
England	Mother-country
Green	Red
Nationality	Disloyalty
Patriotism	O.B.E.
Self-determination	Czecho-Slovakia

According to Boyd, "The West Briton is the near Englishman ... an unfriendly caricature, the reductio ad absurdum of the least attractive English characteristics. ... The best that can be said ... is that the species is slowly becoming extinct. ... nationalism has become respectable". The opposite of the "West Briton" Boyd called the "synthetic Gael".

After the independence of the Irish Free State, "West Briton" was applied mainly to anglophile Roman Catholics, the small number of Catholic unionists, as Protestants were expected to be naturally unionists. This was not automatic, since there were, and are, also Anglo-Irish Protestants favouring Irish republicanism (see Protestant Irish nationalism).

== Contemporary usage ==
"Brit" meaning "British person", attested in 1884, is pejorative in Irish usage, though used as a value-neutral colloquialism in Great Britain. During the Troubles, among nationalists "the Brits" specifically meant the British Army in Northern Ireland. "West Brit" is used presently by Irish people, chiefly within Ireland, to criticise a variety of perceived faults of other Irish people:

- "Revisionism" (compare historical revisionism and historical negationism):
  - Criticism of historical Irish uprisings. (State policy is to praise the patriotism of rebels up to the revolutionary period, while condemning later physical force republicans as antidemocratic.)
  - highlighting perceived benefits of British rule in Ireland
  - downplaying British actions during historical events in Ireland such as the Great Famine
  - Antipathy to Irish rebel songs.
- Anglophilia: following British popular culture; admiration for the British royal family; favouring the Republic of Ireland rejoining the Commonwealth of Nations or becoming a Commonwealth Realm; emphasizing positive British influence in the world, past or present.
- Cultural cringe: appearing embarrassed by or disdainful of aspects of Irish culture, such as the Irish language, Hiberno-English, Gaelic games, or Irish traditional music.
- Partitionism: Opposition or indifference to a United Ireland; showing political endorsement for neo-unionism.

Not all people so labelled may actually be characterised by these stereotypical opinions and habits.

Public perception and self-identity can vary. During his 2011 presidential campaign, Sinn Féin candidate Martin McGuinness criticised what he termed West Brit elements of the media, who he said were out to undermine his attempt to win the election. He later said it was an "off-the-cuff remark" but did not define for the electorate what (or who) he had meant by the term.

Irish TV and radio presenter Terry Wogan, who spent most of his career working for the BBC in Britain, described himself as a West Brit: "I'm an effete, urban Irishman. I was an avid radio listener as a boy, but it was the BBC, not RTÉ. I was a West Brit from the start. [...] I'm a kind of child of the Pale. I think I was born to succeed here [in the UK]; I have much more freedom than I had in Ireland". He became a dual citizen of Ireland and the UK and was eventually knighted by Queen Elizabeth II.

The Irish Times columnist Donald Clarke noted a number of things that may prompt the application of a West Brit label, including being from Dublin (or south Dublin), supporting UK-based football teams, using the phrase "Boxing Day", or voting for Fine Gael.

== Similar terms ==
Castle Catholic, a derogatory term first used in the mid-19th century including in the writings of John Mitchel, is defined in some sources as equivalent to "collaborator". It has been applied by some Republicans to well-off and middle-class Irish Catholics holding Unionist or pro-British sympathies who were integrated into the Dublin Castle administration at Dublin Castle. Sometimes an exaggerated pronunciation spelling was used, Castle Cawtholic, to suggest that their accents were imitative of Received Pronunciation. Speaking in 2020, the historian Donal Fallon suggested that the term has a "conspiratorial aspect" and that there is a "sharp edge to Castle Catholic that isn't really there in West Brit".

The word shoneen (from Irish: Seoinín, diminutive of Seán, thus literally 'Little John', and allegedly a reference to John Bull) was applied to those who emulated the homes, habits, lifestyle, pastimes, clothes, and opinions of the Protestant Ascendancy. P. W. Joyce's English As We Speak It in Ireland defines it as "a gentleman in a small way: a would-be gentleman who puts on superior airs." The Irish historian and academic, F. S. L. Lyons, defined a "shoneen" as a person "of native Irish stock who committed the unforgivable sin of aping English or West-Briton manners and attitudes".

Similar to shoneen, another variant since c. 1840, jackeen ('Little Jack'), was used in the countryside in reference to Dubliners with Unionist sympathies; it is a pun, substituting the nickname Jack for John, as a reference to the Union Jack. During the 20th century, jackeen took on the more generalised meaning of "a self-assertive worthless fellow".

== Antonyms ==
The term is sometimes contrasted with Little Irelander, a derogatory term for an Irish person who is seen as an extreme nationalist, Anglophobic and xenophobic, while sometimes also practising Traditionalist Catholicism. The term was popularised by Seán Ó Faoláin. On the RTÉ program The Live Mike between 1978 and 1982, sketch comedian Dermot Morgan satirised "Little Irelanders", by playing a bigoted Gaelic Athletic Association member who waved his hurley around while verbally attacking his pet hates.

"Little Englander" had been an equivalent term in British politics since about 1859.

An antonym of jackeen, in its modern sense of an urban (and strongly British-influenced) Dubliner, is culchie, referring to an unsophisticated Irish person who resides in the countryside.

== See also ==
- Plastic Paddy
- More Irish than the Irish themselves
- Pom or pommy
- Dic Siôn Dafydd
