= Culchie =

Person from rural Ireland (pejorative)

Culchie is a term in Hiberno-English for someone from rural Ireland. The term usually has a pejorative meaning directed by urban Irish against rural Irish, but since the late 20th century, the term has also been reclaimed by some who are proud of their rural or small-town origin. In Dublin, the term culchie is often used to describe someone from outside County Dublin. In Belfast, Northern Ireland, the term is used to refer to persons from outside of the city proper but not necessarily outside the Greater Belfast area. The etymology of the term is unclear.

== Possible derivations ==
The term is defined in the Oxford English Dictionary as "one who lives in, or comes from, a rural area; a (simple) countryman (or woman), a provincial, a rustic". It is sometimes said to be a word derived from the remote town of Kiltimagh, County Mayo. A further explanation is that the word derives from the word "agriculture", highlighting the agricultural/industrial divide between rural and urban populations.

It may be derived from an Irish-language term cúl an tí, meaning 'back of the house'. It was, and still is to a certain extent, common practice in rural areas to enter a neighbour's house through the back door, to avoid tracking dirt through the house and to visit in the kitchen, rather than the front, which was used for more formal visits. Thus the term cúl an tí or culchie referred to such rural peoples used to such practices. In the late 19th and early 20th centuries, many city dwellers from Dublin tenements worked as domestic servants in the homes of wealthier people. The servants were not permitted to enter the house through the front door but had to use the back door or servants' entrance. It became common practice in Dublin to use culchie in a derogatory manner. Over time, as the numbers of servants dwindled through the 20th century, the term was retained in everyday use.

The word culchie may instead be derived from the Irish word coillte, 'woods, forests'. It was used by townspeople, mainly in the western counties of Mayo and Galway, as a condescending or pejorative reference to people from rural areas. In the mid-1960s it was adopted as a common term in Dublin, as a counter to the country people's use of the word jackeen for a Dublin person. The culchie spelling is common in the English-language media, based on their understanding of phonetics and the word's derivation. It is also sometime spelled cultchie, indicative of its more likely derivation from cúl an tí.

Culchie is also an Irish term for a simple, impromptu bed, chiefly consisting of planks, hastily slung between the tapered end of an inglenook fireplace and the nearest wall of a farmhouse kitchen. A culchie might be offered to anyone who asked for a bed for the night, who was not known to the family (rather like letting someone sleep in the barn). So, this could have become a derogatory term for traveling rural labourers and hence just country folk. However, originally it was just an example of common hospitality as often formerly offered to travellers and those in need.

== Culchie Festival ==
The Culchie Festival started in 1989 in Clonbur, County Galway and ran until 2012. The festival took place in many towns and villages throughout Ireland in its search to find an exemplary culchie or "village character" – a local (perhaps even parochial) personality with the ability to entertain at will and excel at various stereotypically rural tasks.

The festival was held in late October each year after regional heats held throughout Ireland and overseas Irish communities to select contestants. The final consisted of various challenges, such as tractor racing, nappy changing, sandwich making, potato picking, knitting, and karaoke. The 2008 winner was Adrian McCabe from Ballyjamesduff, County Cavan, where the next Culchie Festival was hosted, 23–25 October 2009.
