= Internalized sexism =

Sexist behaviors by women towards themselves

Internalized sexism is a form of sexist behavior and attitudes enacted by women toward themselves or other women and girls. It is a form of internalized oppression, which "consists of oppressive practices that continue to make the rounds even when members of the oppressor group are not present." Internalized sexism can have negative effects on women and girls, including problems with mental health and body image. Modes of internalization of sexism include early childhood inculturation and consumption of media, especially of celebrity and entertainment news.

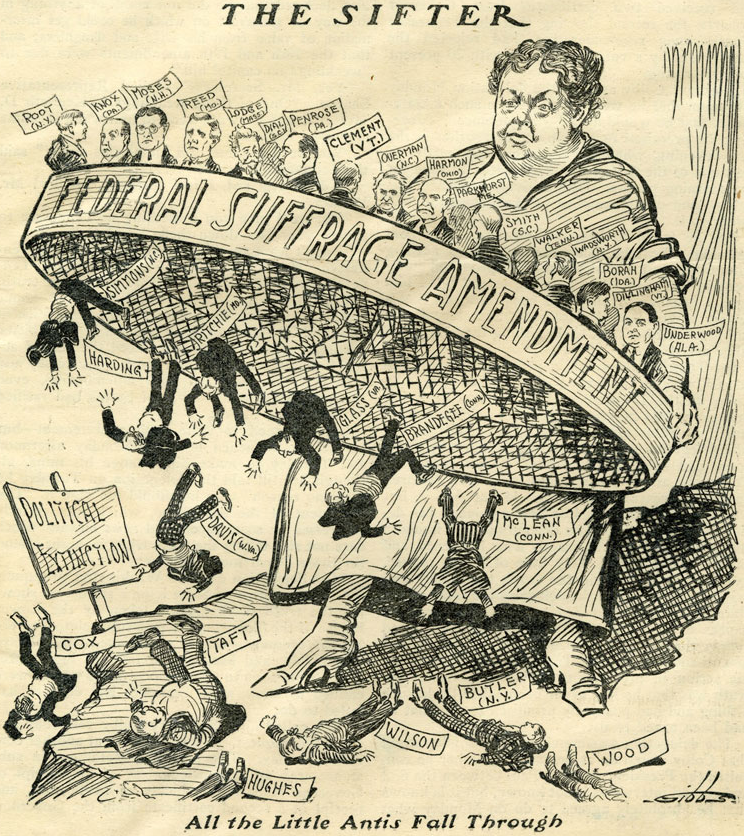
Cartoon published by Woman Patriot Corporation, an American women's organization against women's suffrage

== Effects ==
Internalized sexism has the potential to lead to body issues and a lack of self-confidence. It is a major setback in resolving issues of sexism as a whole. Ties to psychological distress such as anxious, depressive or somatic symptoms, have been identified as results of internalized sexism. Possible effects can be depression and suicidal impulses.

Additionally, studies have found connections between sexual objectification as a result of internalized sexism and body shame, sexual objectification, and disordered eating. Internalized sexism also plays a role in lowered academic goals and diminished job performance.

== Types ==
=== Internalized misogyny ===
Misogyny is hatred of, contempt for, or prejudice against women or girls. Women who experience internalized misogyny may express it through minimizing the value of women, mistrusting women, and showing gender bias in favor of men. Women, after observing societal beliefs which demean the value and skills of women repeatedly, eventually internalize those misogynistic beliefs and apply them to themselves and other women. Internalized misogyny can be enacted on others through assertions of incompetence, construction of women as competitors, construction of women as objects, and invalidation and derogation of others or oneself. The implications of internalized misogyny include psychological disorders such as depression, eating disorders, low self-esteem, and less social support among women.

The Internalized Misogyny Scale (IMS) was created to assess one's internalized misogyny. It consists of 17 items measuring three factors: devaluation of women, distrust of women, and gender bias in favor of men. Its validity has been assessed and supported through multiple studies. Internalized misogyny assessed via the IMS has been found to be related to lower self-esteem, less social support, and more psychological distress among women around the world, and to negative body image, depression, low self-esteem, and less psychosexual adjustment among lesbian and bisexual women. The distrust of women subscale includes statements such as 'It is generally safer not to trust women too much' and 'When it comes down to it a lot of women are deceitful.' The devaluation of women subscale includes statements such as 'Women seek to gain power by getting control over men' and 'women exaggerate problems they have at work.' The valuing men over women subscale includes items such as 'I prefer to work for a male boss' and 'The intellectual leadership of a community should be largely in the hands of men.'

Internalized misogyny may manifest differently depending on one's social and political identities; for instance, internalized misogynoir has been identified as a type of internalized oppression which results from the combination of internalized racism and internalized misogyny. Similarly, lesbians may face the combined effects of internalized misogyny and internalized homophobia as a result of their intersectional identities.

=== Internalized heterosexism ===
Dawn M. Szymanski and colleagues write, in 2008:

Heterosexism, a term developed within the LGB rights movement and modeled on political concepts, refers to an ideological system that operates on individual, institutional, and cultural levels to stigmatize, deny, and denigrate any nonheterosexual way of being.

Internalized heterosexism is generally defined as the internalization of assumptions, negative attitudes and stigma regarding homosexuality by individuals who do not identify within the heteronormative spectrum and/or are categorized as sexual minorities to varying degrees. Internalized heterosexism is a manifestation of internalized sexism that primarily affects sexual minority populations (composed of people who identify lesbian, gay, bisexual, transgender, questioning, or other); however, it can also affect heterosexual populations by dictating how they interact with and relate to non-heterosexual peoples. This phenomenon manifests when sexual minorities begin to adopt rigid heteronormative values into their worldviews.

Examples of these heteronormative values are fundamentalist religious doctrines that condemn non-heterosexual orientations and activities, concepts of masculinity and manhood that emphasize restricted emotionality, or restrictive affectionate behavior between men. The internalization of heteronormativity often create gender role conflicts for people whose actions fall outside the parameters of acceptable cultural norms that promote unrealistic and constricting ideas about what it means to be a man or a woman in modern society. One of the most common consequences of internalized heterosexism is intense depression fueled by self-loathing and sexual repression.

=== Toxic femininity, tradwives, and marianismo ===
Gender-studies scholar Brenda R. Weber uses the term toxic femininity for a code of conformity and social pressure to rigid feminine gender roles, reinforced through (sometimes unconscious) beliefs, such as viewing oneself as unworthy, and imperatives to be consistently pleasant, accommodating, and compliant. According to Weber, such beliefs and expectations "[suggest] there is no a priori female self" apart from the needs and desires of men and boys. Weber associates these norms with "usually white, mostly middle-class, relentlessly heterosexual, and typically politically conservative" expectations of femininity.

In her book Sisters in Hate: American Women and White Extremism, journalist Seyward Darby discusses the onset of the tradwife aesthetic (a neologism of "traditional wife" or "traditional housewife"), depicted by Darby through interviews with women who self-identify as far-right extremists. Darby discusses with three women their personal view of themselves as docile, passive, and submissive in a male-dominated household. Darby also discusses her own observations and evidence of the interviewees' advocacy of tenets of the US political far right, including white supremacy, antisemitism, and other ultraconservative beliefs. One of those interviewed declares that "her primary duty is having children and supporting her husband." Columnist Annie Kelly posits similarities between tradwife aesthetic and white supremacist beliefs, such as conspiracy theories about demographic changes in the United States in an attempt to encourage white women to increase pregnancy to offset the declining white birth rate.

While those who follow tradwife aesthetic have suggested that it is simply an anti-feminist ideal of a simpler time in the 1950s, which supports a return to traditional family values, some feminists argue that feminism allows the choice of being a housewife to begin with:

I say this knowing how lucky I am to be a housewife in 2015 as opposed to 1955. Would I be enjoying it so much without washing machines, dishwashers, supermarkets or disposable nappies? Definitely not. My love of the job has nothing to do with a nostalgia for a past in which, for a start, my lifestyle was inconceivable, and women were going silently mad in their impeccably dusted homes. I can enjoy being a homechief without a supply of Valium precisely because I know it doesn't have to be forever.

Media scholar Roopika Risam writes that charges of toxic femininity have become an Internet meme, exemplary of tensions between feminists online over the concept of intersectionality, and directed primarily towards non-white feminists who are seen as disruptive of mainstream feminist discussions. For example, the writer Michelle Goldberg has criticized online call-out culture as "toxic," likening it to feminist Jo Freeman's concept of "trashing."

Marianismo is a term developed by scholar of Latin American studies Evelyn P. Stevens in a 1973 essay as a direct response to the male word machismo. The ideas within marianismo include those of feminine passivity, sexual purity, and moral strength. Stevens defines marianismo as "the cult of female spiritual superiority, which teaches that women are semidivine, morally superior to and spiritually stronger than men." Hispanic-American feminists have criticized the concept of marianismo as it is often presented the opposite of machismo, which thus puts femininity "the realm of passivity, chastity, and self-sacrifice."

== Hostile and Benevolent Sexism ==
Social psychologists Peter Glick and Susan Fiske have posed a theory of ambivalent sexism, which presents two types of sexism: hostile and benevolent. Hostile sexism reflects misogyny and is expressed more blatantly to the observer. Benevolent sexism, on the other hand, appears much more positive and innocent to the observer, and possibly even to the receiver as well. However, benevolently sexist statements and actions end up implying sexist notions or stereotypes. Glick and Fiske elaborate on the definition of benevolent sexism in their paper:

We define benevolent sexism as a set of interrelated attitudes toward women that are sexist in terms of viewing women stereotypically and in restricted roles but that are subjectively positive in feeling tone (for the perceiver) and also tend to elicit behaviors typically categorized as prosocial (e.g., helping) or intimacy-seeking (e.g., self-disclosure) (Glick & Fiske, 1996, p. 491). [Benevolent sexism is] a subjectively positive orientation of protection, idealization, and affection directed toward women that, like hostile sexism, serves to justify women's subordinate status to men (Glick et al., 2000, p. 763).

== Modes of internalization ==
=== Early childhood inculturation ===
Just as misogyny can be acquired through multiple external sources, internalized misogyny can be learned from those same external forces, in a converse way. Internalized sexism may be promoted through the demeaning of men and women on the basis of their gender in relation to societal and behavioral standards. Internalized misogyny is learned in tandem with female socialization, the idea that young girls are taught to act and behave differently than their male counterparts. These same societal and behavioral standards are also thought to be spread through exposure in the media, which reflects the standards of the society that it serves to inform and entertain.

Internalized sexism is learned primarily during adolescence through socialization into gender related practices. The time period between ages 11–14 has been identified as the most vulnerable period for girls around the world in terms of internalization of sexism. The social cognitive theory of gender development and differentiation elaborates on this socialization process; it describes that young girls learn gender-related behaviors, attitudes, and preferences by modeling others' gender-linked behaviors, learning from the effects of one's own gender-linked behaviors, and/or learning from direct instructions how to practice gender-linked behaviors. Young children are more likely to adopt gender-linked behaviors when they are rewarded, or see someone else rewarded, for that behavior. For example, a girl might wear more stereotypically feminine clothing after learning that conforming to society's expectations of what she should wear leads to social and personal rewards. This process continues as young women face increasing amounts of pressure to conform to the norms of adult women. Thus, internalized sexism is practiced and spread through a range of social situations and influences, including through everyday interaction with peers.

=== Television and cinema ===
There is a long-lasting connection between misogyny and mass media. Sitcoms often portray characters degrading the value of women and commenting on women's weight and size. This contributes to the internalization of gender size stereotypes, sometimes negatively affecting the mental and physical health of females. One of the primary problems in mass media is the under-representation of women in widely consumed productions.

The context of children's entertainment is especially pernicious because young minds are highly impressionable and cartoons have been known to play a pedagogical role in childhood development. A vast amount of early Disney movies showcase a young girl needing to be rescued by a "Prince Charming" to have a happily ever after. A few examples are Cinderella, Snow White, Sleeping Beauty. The Little Mermaid has been criticized because it tells a story of a young woman, Ariel, who gives up her natural identity as a mermaid in order to meet the preferences of her love interest, a human male.

=== Social media ===
Social media is a significant part of modern life. It has the power to sway people's opinions and thoughts about themselves and others. Platforms such as Instagram and TikTok host a diverse population of users and utilize sophisticated algorithms to display videos that users are most likely to be interested in. However, this algorithm can backfire, for example if a user interacts with a video containing pro eating disorder content, as they will then start seeing more and more similar videos, potentially leading to the internalization of these values.

There has also been a significant trend known as "Pick Me Girls" on TikTok. "It can be defined as a social media phenomenon dominated by women who always consider that they are the best in any kind of condition. As they are feeling perfect, they easily hate, insult, and compete with other women." Women viewing other women as competition has been prevalent for a long time across various relationships, including between mothers and daughters, among girlfriends, or even between two strangers on the internet. Thanks to social media, this issue is now being openly discussed in large numbers.

=== Language and communication ===
Differences in communication across genders is influenced by internalized sexism portrayed in everyday conversation. The main target of internalized sexism are predominantly women who are regarded as inferior. In everyday conversation, women are scrutinized by objectification, called derogatory terms, or invalidated not just by men, but other women as well. Other forms of language use toward women include the use of derogatory terms, such as "bitch," "slut," and "hoe," as forms of invalidation. These terms are used as a form of gender role policing for women who defy gender norms or hold more assertive and vocal qualities. The latter two in particular is an example of slut-shaming, which, either consciously or unconsciously, is prevalent in discussions surrounding women. These conversational practices objectify, invalidate and perpetuate internalized sexism.

There are significant differences in language use between genders. Language can also act as a moderator of the maintenance of power imbalance between groups. Derogation and criticism perpetuate social stigma, which then become internalized by those affected. They become critical of themselves and members of their own gender or diminish their own voices. This is known as horizontal oppression, influenced by systematic invalidation and internal dynamics of internalized sexism.

== Origins ==
Internalized sexism develops after repeated exposure to sexist beliefs, gender stereotypes, and unequal social expectations within families, schools, workplaces and media. Being exposed to this from an early age causes individuals to learn to associate certain traits, behaviors, or roles with one gender while devaluing those associated with femininity. Proof of this can be seen with the "Baby X" experiment from Seavey; et al. (1975).

=== Baby X Experiment ===
The goal of the Baby X experiment by Carol A. Seavey and colleagues was to examine whether adults treat infants differently based solely on perceived gender. More specifically, the researchers wanted to test how gender labeling influences social interaction.

The study aimed to show that the differences in treatment come from social expectations rather than actual differences between male and female infants.

==== Procedure ====
In this study, adult participants were asked to interact with a three to four month old infant dressed in a gender neutral outfit (yellow outfit). They manipulated the participants by specifically giving a gender label to the baby. There were three groups within this study: one was told the baby was a boy, another was told it was a girl, and the last group were given no information.

Participants were left alone with the infant for three minutes. Within the room there were three toys; a doll (stereotypically female), a ball or football (stereotypically masculine), and a plastic ring/teething toy (gender neutral). The researchers observed the behaviors that adults took such as toy choice, physical interaction, and overall engagement.

==== Results ====
The study found that adults treated the same baby differently depending on the gender label:

- When the adults were informed the baby was a female, participants were more likely to offer the doll and engage in nurturing behavior.
- When labeled male, participants used more neutral or "masculine" toys like the ring or ball.
- When no gender was given, participants tried guessing the baby's gender, usually relying on stereotypical cues such as the strength or softness of them

Overall, this study showed that gender label strongly influences adult behavior, even when the infant did not change.

=== Implications ===
The Baby X experiment demonstrates internalized sexism by showing how adults unconsciously apply gender stereotypes even in the absence of differences. This study suggests that societal beliefs about gender such as associating femineity with nurturing and masculinity with strength have been internalized to the point where it shapes behavior automatically.

This study shows that sexism is not always deliberate or overt, but often operates through subtle, learned expectations in everyday life. By reinforcing different behaviors and preferences from infancy, these unconscious biases contribute to the early development of gender roles and inequalities. In other words, the experiment provides evidence that internalized sexism is maintained through socialization, as individuals reproduce the same gendered assumptions that they absorbed from their cultural environment.

== Combating internalized sexism ==
Research on interventions and techniques which effectively combat internalized sexism is scarce despite the ubiquity of this phenomenon. However, raising awareness of internalized sexism and the mechanisms behind it enables women to recognize and impede their own internalized sexism. For instance, this awareness may discourage women from participating in derogation of fellow women and encourage them to support other women rather than treat them as competitors. Learning about internalized sexism can therefore empower and support women throughout their everyday lives.

A few other ways to combat internalized sexism is:

- Critical Media Consumption
  - Analyzing media with a critical mind to question the different portrayal of gender and stereotypical representations.
  - Seeking diverse media sources is also a great to see women in different roles and challenging gender stereotypes.
- Dialogue and Communication
  - Engaging in open conversations with peers and friends to help see and challenge commonly held beliefs.
  - With open conversations, it can build a strong support systems with those around and encourage more women and girls of all the diverse roles in society.
  - Equal household chores is also a great way to promote gender equality and combat internalized sexism as women are not the only ones in charge of doing all the household chores.
  - Calling out certain jokes or a certain portrayal of comments to help discourage people from derogating fellow women.
- Education and Awareness
  - Understanding the root causes of sexism and teaching children from young ages on gender equality.
  - Teaching children, teenagers, and young adults on what sexist and derogatory language is and what are some respectful ways to talk about and to each other.

== See also ==
- Bad boy archetype
- Campaign for the Feminine Woman
- Culture of Domesticity
- Ideal womanhood
- Internalized racism
- Internalized oppression
- Kinder, Küche, Kirche
- María Clara
- Molly Mormon
- Mythopoetic Men's Movement
- Self-hatred
- The Angel in the House
- The Stepford Wives
- Toxic masculinity
- Yamato nadeshiko
