= In the Gloaming (song) =

1877 British song

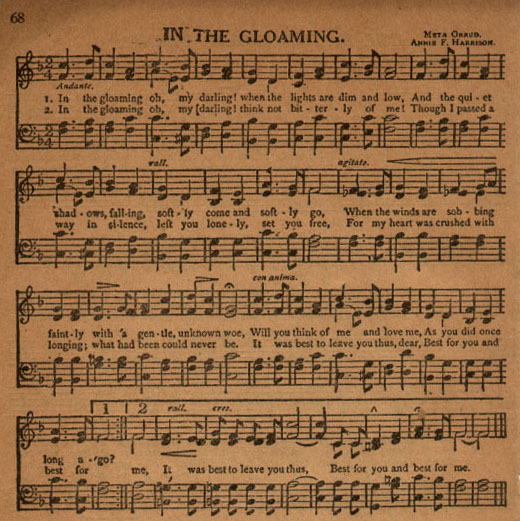

"In the Gloaming" is an 1877 British song composed by Annie Fortescue Harrison, with lyrics taken from a poem by Meta Orred. Orred's poem (of the same title as the song) appeared in her 1874 book Poems. "Gloaming" is a regional dialect term of Scots origin denoting "twilight".

The 1877 song, a lament of romantic regret, was very popular in the United States that year, and was again popularized in America in the 1910s by a recording made by The American Quartet with Will Oakland.

Harrison's husband Lord Arthur Hill was the commanding officer of the 2nd Middlesex Artillery Volunteers, which adopted the song as its regimental march.

== Versions ==
- The American Quartet with Will Oakland released a recorded version in 1910.
- John Lovering released a recorded version in 1914.
- The McKee Trio released a recording of the song in 1916.
- The song was covered by American baritone John Charles Thomas in 1920.
- Fats Waller recorded a version in 1938. The song was a staple of Waller's live act.
- Louis Armstrong and His Hot Seven recorded the song in 1941. It was released as the B side of "Everything's Been Done Before".
- Bunk Johnson (trumpet), Don Ewell (piano) and Alphonse Steele (drums) recorded a version in 1946.
- Jo Stafford and Gordon MacRae released the song on their 'Songs for Sunday Evening' album in 1950.
- Bing Crosby included the song in a medley on his album 101 Gang Songs (1961)
- Northern Irish singer Gloria Hunniford recorded a version for her 1979 studio album A Taste of Hunni.
- The song appeared on the operatic 1982 album Home Sweet Home, featuring mezzo-soprano Felicity Palmer.
- The Story recorded a version, released on their 1993 album The Angel in the House.
- American folk rock singer Jonatha Brooke covered the song a cappella on her 1999 album Jonatha Brooke: Live
- The Celtic Tenors included the song on their eponymous 2002 debut album.
- The song appeared as the 14th track on Irish singer Tommy Fleming's 2003 compilation album The Collection.

== Further reading and listening ==
- 1910 recording – Discography of American Historical Recordings, s.v. "Victor matrix B-9161. In the gloaming / American Quartet; Will Oakland."
