= Angel in the house =

Angel in the house may refer to:

- The Angel in the House, an 1854 poem by Patmore
- The Angel in the House (album), the album by The Story
- Angel in the House (film), another name for the 2011 British film Foster
