= In the Gloaming =

In the Gloaming may refer to:

- "In the Gloaming" (song), 1877 British song
- In the Gloaming (film), 1997 American TV film based on a story by Alice Elliott Dark
- In the Gloaming, 1998 album by Jolene

== See also ==
- Roamin' in the Gloamin', 1911 song
- Homer in the Gloamin', 1938 baseball play
- Gloaming (disambiguation)
