= Lady Arthur Hill =

English composer (1848–1944)

Annie Jessie Fortescue Harrison (30 December 1848 – 12 February 1944), also known as Annie, Lady Hill and Lady Arthur Hill, was an English composer of songs and piano pieces. She composed two operettas that were staged in London, but is best known as the composer of the 1877 popular ballad In the Gloaming. The song was adopted as the regimental march of the 2nd Middlesex Artillery Volunteers.

== Life ==
Harrison was born in Calcutta, British India, the daughter of James Fortescue Harrison, MP of Kilmarnock (other sources record her birthplace as Crawleywood, Sussex). She was composing solo piano pieces, such as The Elfin Waltzes, by the age of 13. In 1865, the family moved to Crawley Down, Sussex, where her father built a mansion called Down Park.

Her most popular song was "In the Gloaming" (1877), with lyrics by Meta Orred written a year earlier. Harrison composed the song while considering a marriage proposal from the widowed Lord Arthur Hill. Musicologist Derek B. Scott reports that as soon as Arthur Hill heard the song, he was desperate to marry Annie Harrison. His first wife had died shortly after the birth of their son, a year into their marriage. Harrison married Lord Arthur in 1877, and they had a daughter nine months later.

Arthur Hill was the commanding officer of the 2nd Middlesex artillery, and they adopted the song as their regimental march. Harrison also composed two operettas: the first, The Ferry Girl, was first performed in 1883 at St. George's Hall in London, and was revived and expanded into two acts at the Savoy Theatre in 1890. It also played at the Gaiety Theatre. The second operetta, The Lost Husband, was produced at the Opera Comique in London in the spring of 1886.

Harrison died on 12 February 1944 in Easthampton, Berkshire, predeceased by her husband in 1931.

== Works ==
Operettas

- The Ferry Girl (1883, rev. 1890) (text Dowager Marchioness of Downshire)
- The Lost Husband (1886)

Ballads

- At Noontide
- In the Gloaming (1877)
- In the Moonlight (sequel to above)
- I want to be a soldier
- Let Me Forget Thee
- Yesteryear

Piano

- The Elfin Waltzes
- Our Favourite Galop
