= Gloaming =

Gloaming may refer to:

- Twilight, the period after sunset and before the darkness of night
- The Gloaming, an Irish traditional music group
  - The Gloaming (album), their first album
- Gloaming (horse) (1915–1932), a Thoroughbred racehorse
- The Gloaming (TV series), a 2019 Australian web TV series
- The Gloaming, the subtitle of Radiohead's album Hail to the Thief and the title of one of its tracks

== See also ==
- In the Gloaming (disambiguation)
- "Roamin' in the Gloamin'", a song by Harry Lauder
