= 10 Cent Wings =

Studio album by Jonatha Brooke
- Released: 1997
- Genre: Pop
- Label: Refuge/MCA
- Producer: Alain Mallet

Jonatha Brooke chronology
Plumb (1995)	10 Cent Wings (1997)	Live (1999)

10 Cent Wings is an album by the American musician Jonatha Brooke, released in 1997. It was her only album for MCA Records. The title refers to an ad a venue once ran to promote a Brooke live show. "Crumbs" was the first single.

The album peaked at No. 34 on Billboard's Heatseekers Albums chart. Its singles were hits on adult album alternative radio stations.

== Production ==
The album was produced by Brooke's husband, Alain Mallet. "Glass Half Empty" is about the deceased musician Kevin Gilbert. Duke Levine contributed guitar parts to the album, and Bob Clearmountain served as mixing engineer.

== Critical reception ==
Professional ratings
Review scores
Source	Rating
AllMusic	4/5 stars
The Encyclopedia of Popular Music	3/5 stars
Entertainment Weekly	A−
The Indianapolis Star	3.5/4 stars
Los Angeles Daily News	3.5/4 stars
MusicHound Rock: The Essential Album Guide	3.5/5 stars
Windsor Star	4/5 stars

The Washington Post wrote that, "at times Brooke stretches her literary conceits too far, but her keyboardist-producer-arranger-husband Alain Mallet always wraps her appealing melodies in quirky, thickened chamber-pop arrangements." Entertainment Weekly praised Brooke's "complex, intensely melodic tunes and her uncliched, heartfelt poetry." The New York Times concluded that Brooke "ventures further into torchy folk-pop with high literary aspirations."

The Los Angeles Daily News thought that the "startlingly mature collection is eclectic and electric with Brooke supplying acoustic guitar and emotionally charged, first-rate material." The Chicago Tribune determined that, "while her strong new album ... doesn't completely sidestep the occasional cliché, the songs generally showcase a noteworthy artistry." The Indianapolis Star stated that Brooke's "conversational style is accessible and perfectly suited for her musical tone—folky and earth-toned, with strings, horns and electronics painting some of the backdrop." The Milwaukee Journal Sentinel listed the album as the sixth best of 1997.

AllMusic wrote that "Mallet pastes together various genres without meshing them, and often the verses, chorus and bridge each have a radically different style." No Depression determined that Brooke "made exactly the right record at exactly the right time—1997’s 10 Cent Wings, released the same year Lilith Fair made her brand of classy female-centric folk-pop all the rage—and found herself bounced from the major-label ranks for her trouble."

== Track listing ==
No.	Title	Length
1.	"Secrets and Lies"	4:28
2.	"Crumbs"	5:03
3.	"Because I Told You So"	3:48
4.	"Blood from a Stone"	4:20
5.	"Glass Half Empty"	4:21
6.	"The Choice"	5:20
7.	"Last Innocent Year"	4:48
8.	"Shame on Us"	4:59
9.	"Genius or a Fool"	4:45
10.	"Ten Cent Wings"	4:05
11.	"Landmine"	5:57
12.	"Annie"	3:27
