= The Works (Jonatha Brooke album) =

2008 album by Jonatha Brooke

Studio album by Jonatha Brooke
- Released: August 29, 2008
- Genre: folk-rock
- Label: Bad Dog Records
- Producer: Jonatha Brooke, Bob Clearmountain

Jonatha Brooke chronology
| Careful What You Wish For (2007) | The Works (2008) | My Mother Has 4 Noses (2014) |

The Works, Jonatha Brooke's seventh solo release, is a full-length album primarily of previously unheard lyrics by Woody Guthrie, set to original music written and performed by Brooke. Brooke was invited by Guthrie's daughter Nora to sift through the private archives and hunt through Guthrie's unreleased material for possible adaptations. Brooke said she was "smitten" with Guthrie's work and going through it was like "going to church." She liked his poetic love songs like "My Sweet and Bitter Bowl" and spiritual deeper tunes like "My Battle" and loved Guthrie's "full spectrum of craziness" as she described his writings. The album also includes two songs fully written by Brooke.

Professional ratings
Review scores
| Source | Rating |
|---|---|
| AllMusic | 3.5/5 stars |
| Robert Christgau | A- |
| PopMatters | 7/10 stars |

== Track listing ==
All songs written by Woody Guthrie (lyrics) and Jonatha Brooke (music), except where indicated.

1. "My Sweet and Bitter Bowl"
2. "You'd Oughta Be Satisfied Now"
3. "All You Gotta Do Is Touch Me"
4. "My Flowers Grow Green"
5. "Madonna on the Curb"
6. "There's More True Lovers Than One"
7. "Sweetest Angel"
8. "My Battle"
9. "Little Bird" (lyrics by Jonatha Brooke)
10. "Taste of Danger" (lyrics by Jonatha Brooke)
11. "New Star"
12. "Coney Island Intro"
13. "King of My Love"

== Album credits ==
- Jonatha Brooke – vocals, guitar
- Steve Gadd – drums
- Greg Leisz – steel guitar
- Christian McBride – bass guitar
- Joe Sample – keyboard

Additional musicians

- Davy Knowles – guitar and vocals on "Taste of Danger"
- Eric Bazilian – vocals on "There's More True Lovers Than One"
- Keb Mo – vocals on "All You Gotta Do Is Touch Me"
- Glen Phillips – vocals on "Sweetest Angel"
- Derek Trucks – slide guitar on "New Star"

== See also ==
- Woody Guthrie Foundation
- Billy Bragg & Wilco - Mermaid Avenue, (1998/2012)
- The Klezmatics - Wonder Wheel, (2006)
- Jay Farrar - New Multitudes, (2012)
