= Meta Orred =

Scottish author and poet

Meta Caroline Orred (1845 or 1846, in Edinkillie, Elginshire, Scotland – 23 May 1925, in Bournemouth) was an author and poet.

Though born in Scotland, she lived most of her life in England, where she produced her literature and poetry. She is best known for her poem In the Gloaming, which was later set to music by Lady Arthur Hill in 1877, becoming an enduring traditional folk song.

Orred also wrote two novels, A Long Time Ago (1876) and Honour's Worth (1878).

Orred never married and died in Bournemouth in 1925.

== Selected works ==
- Poems (1874)
- A Long Time Ago (1876)
- Berthold, and Other Poems (1878)
- Honor's Worth; or, The Cost of a Vow (1878)
- Ave (all' Anima mea) (1880)
- A Dream Alphabet and Other Poems
