= Grace in Gravity =

Studio album by The Story
- Released: 1991
- Genre: folk-rock
- Length: 47:10
- Label: Green Linnet, Elektra
- Producer: Ben Wittman

The Story chronology
Grace in Gravity (1991)	The Angel in the House (1993)

Alternative cover
- Elektra re-release cover

Professional ratings
Review scores
Source	Rating
AllMusic	4/5 stars

Grace in Gravity (1991) is the debut album from the folk-rock duo The Story. The album was first released by Green Linnet Records and in 1992 it was re-released by Elektra Records with the same track listing.

== Track listing ==
All tracks are written by Jonatha Brooke, except as noted.

No.	Title	Length
1.	"Grace in Gravity"	4:40
2.	"The Perfect Crime"	3:14
3.	"Always"	6:40
4.	"Damn Everything But the Circus"	4:31
5.	"The Alarm is on Love"	4:21
6.	"Easier Than Sorry"	3:53
7.	"Just One Word"	4:06
8.	"And Our Faces, My Heart, Brief as Photos"	3:56
9.	"Dog Dreams"	4:04
10.	"Over Oceans"	5:15
11.	"Love Is More Thicker Than Forget" (poem by E.E. Cummings)	2:30
Total length:		47:10

== The Story is ==
- Jonatha Brooke - Vocals, Acoustic Guitar, Piano
- Jennifer Kimball - Vocals

== Musicians ==
- Duke Levine - Guitars
- Mike Rivard - Bass
- Alain Mallet - Keyboards
- Ben Wittman - Drummer

== Production ==
- Ben Wittman - Producer
- Bill Verdier - Executive Producer
- Coleman Rogers - Recording Engineer
- Mixed by Ben Whittman, Alain Mallet and Coleman Rogers
- Recorded at Bay Farm Studios, Kingston, MA except track 11 at Blue Jay Studio, Carlisle, MA (Engineer: Mark Tanzer)
- Mastered by Suha Gur at Digital SoundWorks, New York City

Track information and credits verified from the album's liner notes.
