= Culture of Domesticity =

19th-century value system for American women

The Culture of Domesticity (often shortened to Cult of Domesticity) or Cult of True Womanhood^{[a]} is a term used by historians to describe what they consider to have been a prevailing value system among the upper and middle classes during the 19th century in the United States. This value system emphasized new ideas of femininity, the woman's role within the home and the dynamics of work and family. "True women", according to this idea, were supposed to possess four cardinal virtues: piety, purity, domesticity, and submissiveness. The idea revolved around the woman being the center of the family; she was considered "the light of the home".

The women and men who most actively promoted these standards were generally white and Protestant; the most prominent of them lived in New England and the Northeastern United States. Although all women were supposed to emulate this ideal of femininity, black, working class, and immigrant women were often excluded from the definition of "true women" because of social prejudice.

Since the idea was first advanced by Barbara Welter in 1966, many historians have argued that the subject is far more complex and nuanced than terms such as "Cult of Domesticity" or "True Womanhood" suggest, and that the roles played by and expected of women within the middle-class, 19th-century context were quite varied and often contradictory. For example, it has been argued that much of what had traditionally been considered antifeminist has instead helped lead to feminism.

== Virtues ==
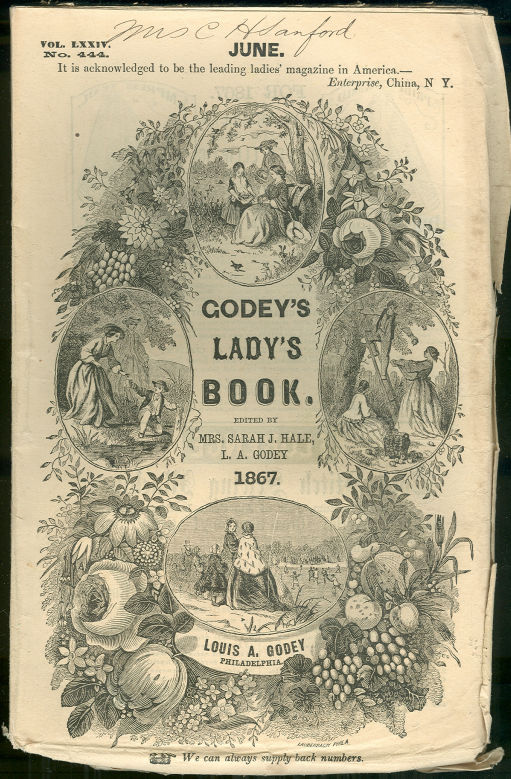
Godey's Lady's Book was a highly influential women's magazine which reinforced many of the values of the Cult of Domesticity.

Part of the separate spheres ideology, the "Cult of Domesticity" identified the home as a woman's "proper sphere". Women were supposed to inhabit the private sphere, running the household and production of food (including servants), rearing the children, and taking care of the husband. According to Barbara Welter (1966), "True Women" were to hold and practice the four cardinal virtues:

1. Piety – Religion was valued because—unlike intellectual pursuits—it did not take a woman away from her "proper sphere," the home, and because it controlled women's longings.
2. Purity – Virginity, a woman's greatest treasure, must not be lost until her marriage night, and a married woman had to remain committed only to her husband.
3. Submission – True women were required to be as submissive and obedient "as little children" because men were regarded as women's superiors "by God's appointment".
4. Domesticity – A woman's proper place was in the home and her role as a wife was to create a refuge for her husband and children. Cooking, needlework, making beds, and tending flowers were considered naturally feminine activities, whereas reading anything other than religious biographies was discouraged.

According to Welter, an ideal True Woman was "frail", too mentally and physically weak to leave her home. The care of her home made her feminine, and she depended on men to protect her within the shelter of it. Wilma Mankiller agrees, claiming that a "True Woman" was expected to be delicate, soft, and weak. She was not to engage in strenuous physical activity that would damage her “much more delicate nervous system."

Frances B. Cogan, however, described an overlapping but competing ideology that she called the ideal of "Real Womanhood," in which women were encouraged to be physically fit and active, involved in their communities, well educated, and artistically accomplished, although usually within the broader idea that women were best suited to the domestic sphere. The conflation of "Domesticity" and "True Womanhood" can be misleading in that dedication to the domestic sphere did not necessarily imply purity, submission, or weakness.

The characteristics of "True Womanhood" were described in sermons, books, and religious texts as well as women's magazines. Prescriptive literature advised women on how to transform their homes into domestic sanctuaries for their husbands and children. Fashion was also stressed because a woman had to stay up to date in order to please her husband. Instructions for seamstresses were often included in magazines. Magazines which promoted the values of the "Cult of Domesticity" fared better financially than those competing magazines which offered a more progressive view in terms of women's roles. In the United States, Peterson's Magazine and Godey's Lady's Book were the most widely circulated women's magazines and were popular among both women and men. With a circulation of 150,000 by 1860, Godey's reflected and supported some of the ideals of the "Cult of True Womanhood." The magazine's paintings and pictures illustrated the four virtues, often showing women with children or behind husbands. It also equated womanhood with motherhood and being a wife, declaring that the "perfection of womanhood (...) is the wife and mother". The magazine presented motherhood as a woman's natural and most satisfying role and encouraged women to find their fulfillment and their contributions to society mainly within the home. At the same time, the long-time editor of Godey's, Sarah Josepha Hale, encouraged women to improve themselves intellectually, to write, and to take action that would improve the moral character of their communities and their nation. Hale promoted Vassar College, advocated for female physicians, and published many of the most important female writers of the 19th century. Frances B. Cogan argued that Godey's supported "Real Womanhood" more than "True Womanhood." Reflecting the ideals of both "True Womanhood" and "Real Womanhood," Godey's considered mothers as crucial in preserving the memory of the American Revolution and in securing its legacy by raising the next generation of citizens.

== Influence on society ==
The Cult of Domesticity affected married women's labor market participation in the 19th and the beginning of the 20th century. "True Women" were supposed to devote themselves to unpaid domestic labor and refrain from paid, market-oriented work. Consequently, in 1890, 4.5% of all married women were "gainfully employed," compared with 40.5% of single women. Women's complete financial dependence upon their husbands proved disastrous, however, when wives lost their husbands through death or desertion and were forced to fend for themselves and their children. This division between the domestic and public spheres had effects on women's power and status. In the society as a whole, particularly in political and economic arenas, women's power declined. Within the home, however, they gained symbolic power.

The legal implications of this ideology included the passage of protective labor laws, which also limited women's employment opportunities outside the home. These laws, as well as subsequent Supreme Court rulings such as Muller v. Oregon, were based on the assumption that women's primary role was that of mother and wife, and that women's non-domestic work should not interfere with their primary function. As a result, women's working hours were limited and night work for women was prohibited, essentially costing many female workers their jobs and excluding them from many occupations.

The Cult of Domesticity "privatized" women's options for work, for education, for voicing opinions, or for supporting reform. Arguments of significant biological differences between the sexes (and often of female inferiority) led to pronouncements that women were incapable of effectively participating in the realms of politics, commerce, or public service. Women were seen as better suited to parenting. Also, because of the expected behaviors, women were assumed to make better teachers of younger children. Catharine Beecher, who proselytised about the importance of education and parenting, once said, "Woman's great mission is to train immature, weak, and ignorant creatures [children] to obey the laws of God ... first in the family, then in the school, then in the neighborhood, then in the nation, then in the world". One of the first public jobs for women was teaching. One estimate says that, with the growth of public education in the northern tier of states, one-quarter of all native-born Massachusetts women in the years between 1825 and 1860 were schoolteachers at some point in their lives.

== Connection to the women's movement ==
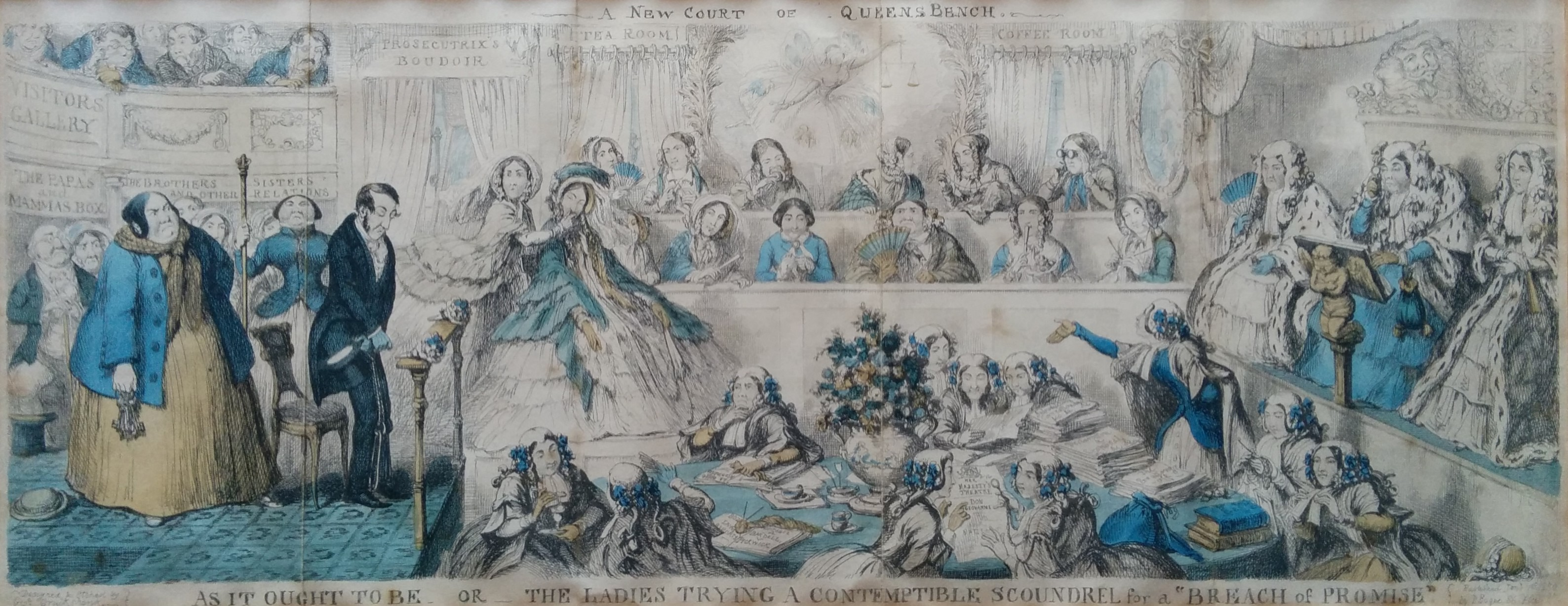
A New Court of Queen's Bench, an 1849 caricature by George Cruikshank, mocking the idea of women taking over the all-male world of the high courts of law

Women's rights advocates of the late 18th and early 19th centuries, such as Mary Wollstonecraft, Frances Wright, and Harriet Martineau, were widely accused of disrupting the natural order of things and condemned as unfeminine. "They are only semi-women, mental hermaphrodites," wrote Henry F. Harrington in the Ladies' Companion. However, after the Jacksonian era (1812 to 1850) saw the expansion of voting rights to virtually all white males in the United States, many women believed it was their opportunity for increased civil liberties. Early feminist opposition to many of the values promoted by the Cult of Domesticity (especially concerning women's suffrage, political activism, and legal independence) culminated in the Seneca Falls Convention in 1848. Author and critic John Neal wrote fiction in this period to challenge the tenets of the Cult of Domesticity. His 1859 novel True Womanhood is a defense of unmarried women; he states in the preface "that marriage is not always the best thing, nor the one thing needful for [women], whatever it may be to [men]."

Susan M. Cruea postulated that although the "Cult of True Womanhood" set many societal restrictions that took away women's working rights and freedom, it nonetheless laid the groundwork for the later development of feminism by crediting women with a moral authority which implicitly empowered them to extend their moral influence outside the home. The ideal woman was expected to act as a status symbol for men and reflect her husband's wealth and success, and was to create babies and care for them so that her husband's legacy of success would continue, but she was also seen as the "Angel in the House" whose purpose was to guide her family morally. Because of the perceived importance of the role, this ideology was imprinted on girls at a very young age; these girls were taught to value their virginity as the "'pearl of great price' which was her greatest asset" and to develop the skills to manage a household and rear children, but they were also taught to see themselves as "a pillar of strength and virtue" who was key not only in providing her husband a proper image but in raising boys who would later have a direct impact on the success of the nation.

During the Progressive Era, the ideal of the New Woman emerged as a response to the Cult of True Womanhood. The New Woman, frequently associated with the suffrage movement, represented an ideal of femininity which was strongly opposed to the values of the Cult of True Womanhood. With demands expressed in the Declaration of Sentiments, written at the Seneca Falls convention in 1848, women finally gained ratification of a constitutional amendment and the right to vote in 1920. After emancipation, these New Women could be identified by as "cigarette-smoking, lipsticked and rouged, jazz-dancing, birth-control-using types known as 'modern girls' or flappers."

The Second World War brought about a restructuring of the labor market as women stepped into the war effort on the home front. In the era after the end of the Second World War, many of the ideas of the "Cult of Domesticity" were stressed again as American society sought to integrate veterans and emphasize the revival of family life. Once the troops returned home, men were encouraged to embrace family life and enter companionship marriages. Veterans returned home to be the head of the family and women who had been involved in high-paying and high-skilled wartime jobs were pushed back into the home. The remaking of the private life was central to this era. Anti-communist sentiments structured much of the American life, emphasizing the free enterprise system which brought about a period of economic prosperity and a consumer culture.

In the 1950s, American television shows often presented series that depicted fictional families in which the mother's primary work was to raise the children and run the household. Men's and women's spheres were increasingly separated as many families lived in suburban settings, from which men commuted to other cities for work. However, this image of separate spheres disguised the reality that all groups of women continued to work for pay; many did not stop working after the men returned home from the war, they were instead forced into lower-paying jobs. Wages were low and there was little room for advancement. Women that did enter into professional fields were under intense scrutiny for going against the feminine domestic ideal. Despite neo-domestic ideals, many middle-class mothers were burdened by women's double shift of working in the home and also a job. At the same time, women had independent lives during the day and were often active in volunteer and community activities, particularly around issues of education, health, children, and welfare. The "Cult of Domesticity" paved the way for the nuclear family. Betty Friedan's The Feminine Mystique summed up the expectations of female nature of this time, with a focus on "consumerism, sexualized marriage, and civic activism." Opposition to those ideas influenced the second wave of feminism.

== Domesticity representation in media ==
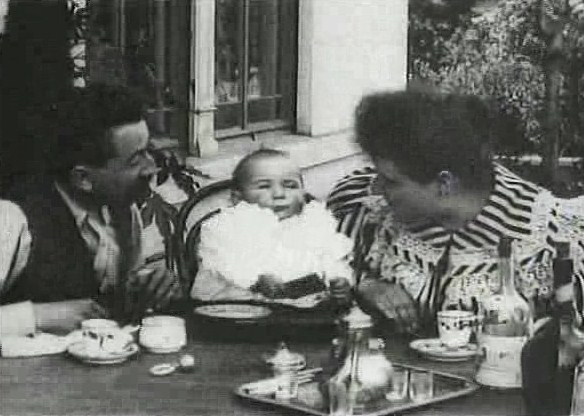
Still from the film Repas de bébé, a 1895 family-centered short

Domesticity and media have always been interconnected. One of the first films ever shown was a family-centered piece titled Repas de bébé ('Baby's Meal'). This 1895 Lumière brothers film depicted a French couple feeding their infant breakfast. Older content including domestic themes, often served to represent white, nuclear, families and female-centered tropes, the "women's weepie" being one common trope, in which mothers sacrificed their own personal identity and well being in order to provide for their children. This is a drastic difference from the "femme fatale" trope which demonstrates a rejection of domestic life and family connection in favor of romance, sexuality, danger, and drama. There are more inclusive representations of domesticity in today's media versus the more limited, heteronormative examples of the past.

Domesticity has long served as a home base for discussions on polarizing subjects. Sexuality, politics, gender, and race are all topics seen and discussed in domestic-centric content. It is also seen across many genres, being well represented in comedy, drama, talk, reality television, and horror. Family life and relationships, in addition to other domestic themes, are amongst the most popular with consumers as well. This is proven by programming such as the television sitcom Leave It to Beaver, which presented a 20th-century view of the nuclear family, and Modern Family, which showed a wider variety of family structures and was one of the highest grossing shows during its run on air.

With the entrance of women into the workforce, the increase of divorce rates, and rise of single parents, themes of typical domesticity became less widely applicable. Shows like The Fosters, which highlighted blended families, became more common.

With lowering societal expectations of the nuclear family being the common end goal of most people, Western media made way for the depiction of "chosen families", or non-biological groups who provide support in a familial way. These groups are commonly seen in, but not limited to, LGBTQ+-centered programming. Examples include the central friendship group of Friends or even the science fiction show The Mandalorian, where the main character takes in a foreign creature as his own. The genre of science fiction is far from removed from including its own domestic themes; an example would be Buffy the Vampire Slayer, where the main character of Buffy is framed as a tough, strong, action hero who also values the domestic femininity of being a young woman.

In another contrast from the nuclear family structure, there is much more representation of people of color in modern domestic media content, though this is often limited and stereotypical in presentation, particularly for women of color. Today, more powerful, successful, black families are at the core of some of the most popular modern programs such as Empire.

LGBTQ+ themes are also expanding the present media displays of domesticity. Programming such as Queer Eye demonstrate this through a blend of domestic representation such as home design, self presentation, and interracial queer representation.

The heteronormative qualities displayed in early domestic values were also challenged in the show Transparent, where one parent reveals they are transgender and decides to transition whilst managing a family life. Representation of transgender identities are becoming more frequent in media. Even family lifestyle network TLC aired a popular show, I Am Jazz, about a transgender teenager and her family. Though the introduction of a transgender lead may be a relatively new idea, the themes discussed are no different than seen in most family programming, such as dating, crushes, school, and dealing with sibling relationships.

Workplaces are another common setting in which similar themes are seen. Coworkers often behave in a familial manner and have unique interpersonal connections. This interpretation of domesticity has become permanently embedded into popular culture with cult favorites like The Office, Parks and Recreation, Grey's Anatomy, and Mad Men. With households working more combined hours than ever before, workplaces sometimes serve as social support, especially when home life is less than ideal. Classic domestic themes like relationship disputes or love do not have to be limited to the biological family.

In a large departure from the traditional domestic value of purity, modern media has shone a light upon the traditionally taboo topic of teen pregnancy. The emergence of this theme was seen in films such as Juno, or the controversial MTV series 16 and Pregnant; which, amongst the topic of teen pregnancy, also discussed safe sex and adoption. The show, whilst modern in its nature, also connects to traditional domestic themes such as purity. It promotes the importance of young women patrolling their bodies and the notion of being a good mother as most important over education or social activities.

Within the intersection of domesticity and media, traditional domestic values are not erased, but rather expanded to include modern representations. Home life, sexuality, and independence are now being reflected by the diversity in media rather than restricted to limited representation.

== See also ==
- Barbie (film)
- Domostroy
- Father Knows Best
- Gender role
- Girl next door
- Glass ceiling
- Good Wife, Wise Mother
- Home economics
- Ideal womanhood
- Incidents in the Life of a Slave Girl
- Kinder, Küche, Kirche
- María Clara
- Marianismo
- Martha Stewart
- Molly Mormon
- Motherhood
- New Woman
- Separate spheres
- The Angel in the House
- The Feminine Mystique
- The Stepford Wives
- Tradwife
- Yamato nadeshiko
