= The Angel in the House =

1854 narrative poem by Coventry Patmore

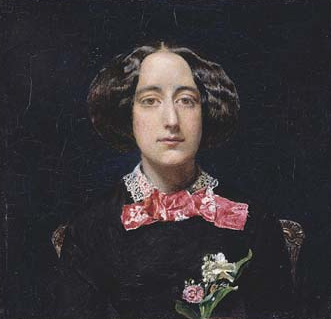
Patmore's wife Emily, the model for the Angel in the House, portrayed by John Everett Millais

The Angel in the House is a narrative poem by Coventry Patmore, first published in 1854 and expanded until 1862. Although largely ignored upon publication, it became enormously popular in the United States during the later 19th century and then in Britain, and its influence continued well into the twentieth century as it became part of many English Literature courses once adopted by W. W. Norton & Company into The Norton Anthology of English Literature. The poem was an idealised account of Patmore's courtship of his first wife, Emily Augusta Andrews (1824–1862), whom he married in 1847 and believed to be the perfect woman. According to Carol Christ, it is not a very good poem, "yet it is culturally significant, not only for its definition of the sexual ideal, but also for the clarity with which it represents the male concerns that motivate fascination with that ideal."

== The poem ==
The poem is in two main parts, but was originally published in four installments. The first was published with the main title in 1854. It was followed by "The Espousals" (1856), "Faithful for Ever" (1860), and "The Victories of Love" (1862). The latter two installments are effectively a separate poem, related to the main text.

The first two installments form a single coherent poem. It begins with a preface in which the poet, called Felix Vaughan in the book, tells his wife that he is going to write a long poem about her. The narrative then begins with an account of the poet's youth when he meets Honoria Churchill, the woman who is to become his wife. It proceeds in a series of short lyrics, representing Felix's reflections on his beloved, and on the nature of ideal femininity. There are also lyrics written from the point of view of Honoria. These reflective and lyrical sections are set into a narrative of the growing relationship between the couple, the emergence of a rival suitor, Honoria's cousin Frederick, who is rejected in favour of Felix, and the couple's eventual marriage.

The final two installments, known together by the title The Victories of Love, are written mostly from the point of view of Frederick, the rejected suitor, who marries another woman, Jane, after his rejection by Honoria. Unlike the first part, this section is in the form of an epistolary novel. Each poem is presented as a letter from one character to another. The initial letters, between Frederick and his mother, reveal that Frederick admits to feeling dissatisfied with his wife, especially whenever he meets his first love and her husband. The poem describes his struggle to overcome these feelings and to concentrate all his love on his wife, who also expresses her own doubts in letters to her mother. The other characters express their anxieties and hopes about the relationship between Frederick and Jane. Honoria helps Jane by her own example, and in the end Frederick overcomes his doubts and feels complete devotion to his wife.

== The ideal ==
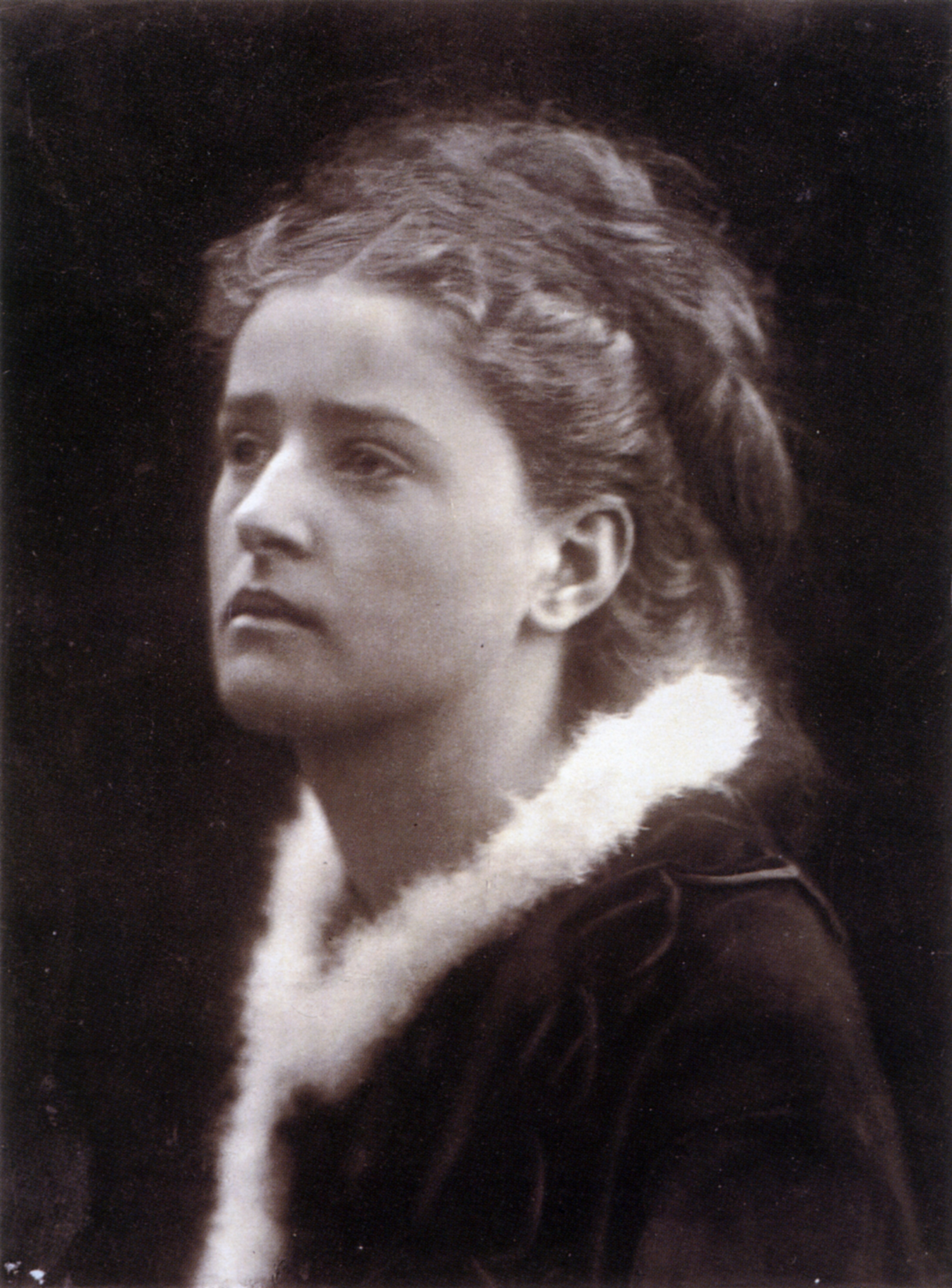
Julia Margaret Cameron's photograph The Angel in the House

A renewed interest in Patmore's poem has come about in the past half a century which stems largely from interests in the various aspects of Victorian lifestyles. The poem is often studied primarily for its unadulterated and in-depth look at the common life of middle class lifestyles in Victorian England. It is considered more valuable among scholars for its historical relevance and its detailed accounts of gendered separations than it is for its literary value.

Its detailed accounts stem from Patmore's belief that the routine machinations of everyday life are prime subject for the illuminations of the poet. Every day routines and interactions of man and woman are things to be elucidated through verse. Due to his close accounts and evaluations, the role of woman in the poem exemplifies the Victorian theory of separate spheres. This ideology asserts that women and men are naturally predisposed to excel in a specific realm of society or culture. Women were regarded as being given to aspects of the private or domestic sphere which generally entailed caring for the house and children, while men were made for the public sphere which makes it appropriate for them to leave the home for work and civic obligations.

Specifically in recent decades, the study of the poem has increased among feminine studies in opposition to the assertion of these spheres. Rather than studying the poem for its depiction of the woman's lifestyle, it is studied to examine the masculine writer's prejudices, his view of these feminine roles and why men held women to these roles. Following the publication of Patmore's poem, the term angel in the house came to be used in reference to women who embodied the Victorian feminine ideal: a wife and mother who was selflessly devoted to her children and submissive to her husband. The term then evolved into a more derogatory assessment of antiquated roles with critiques from feminist writers like Virginia Woolf.

Adèle Ratignolle, a character in Kate Chopin's novel The Awakening, is a literary example of the angel in the house.

Another example is in the What Katy Did novels of Susan Coolidge, about a pre-pubescent tomboy who becomes a paraplegic. They are based on her own life in 19th-century America. Katy eventually walks again, but not before she learns to become the "angel in the house", that is, the socially acceptable "ideal" of docile womanhood.

In Thomas Hardy's The Return of the Native, Thomasin Yeobright is also described as "the angel of the house". Thomasin is the antithesis to Hardy's main female protagonist, Eustacia Vye, who is the opposite of the Victorian female "ideal".

Images were also created with this name, including Millais' portrait of Patmore's wife Emily, and Julia Margaret Cameron's photograph of an enraptured girl.

== Critics ==
Later feminist writers ridiculed the Angel. Virginia Woolf satirised the ideal of femininity depicted in the poem, writing that "She [the perfect wife] was intensely sympathetic. She was immensely charming. She was utterly unselfish. She excelled in the difficult arts of family life. She sacrificed daily. If there was a chicken, she took the leg; if there was a draught she sat in it ... Above all, she was pure." She emphasized that she "bothered me and wasted my time and so tormented me that at last I killed her" (Woolf, 1966: 2, 285).

Nel Noddings views her as "infantile, weak and mindless" (1989: 59), arguing that she is a "prisoner in the house she graces". Similarly, Charlotte Perkins Gilman wrote a short essay entitled The Extinct Angel in which she described the angel in the house as being as dead as the dodo (Gilman, 1891: 200). The art historian Anthea Callen adapted the poem's title for her monograph on female artists, The Angel in the Studio: Women in the Arts and Crafts Movement 1870–1914, published in 1979.

More recently, the feminist folk-rock duo The Story used the title in their album The Angel in the House.

== Excerpts ==
=== The Prologue ===
"There does, beyond desert, befall
(May my great fortune make me great!)
The first of themes sung last of all.
In green and undiscover'd ground,
Yet near where many others sing,
I have the very well-head found
Whence gushes the Pierian Spring."

Then she: "What is it, Dear? The Life
Of Arthur, or Jerusalem's Fall?"
"Neither: your gentle self, my wife,
And love, that grows from one to all."

— Part I, Book I, Prologue: 3.10–4.4

=== The Paragon ===
But when I look on her and hope
To tell with joy what I admire,
My thoughts lie cramp'd in narrow scope,
Or in the feeble birth expire;
No skill'd complexity of speech,
No simple phrase of tenderest fall,
No liken’d excellence can reach
Her, the most excellent of all,
The best half of creation’s best,
Its heart to feel, its eye to see,
The crown and complex of the rest,
Its aim and its epitome.
Nay, might I utter my conceit,
'Twere after all a vulgar song,
For she's so simply, subtly sweet,
My deepest rapture does her wrong.
Yet is it now my chosen task
To sing her worth as Maid and Wife;
Nor happier post than this I ask,
To live her laureate all my life.

— Part I, Book I, Canto II: I.25–I.44

=== The Wife's Tragedy ===
Man must be pleased; but him to please
Is woman's pleasure; down the gulf
Of his condoled necessities
She casts her best, she flings herself.
How often flings for nought! and yokes
Her heart to an icicle or whim,
Whose each impatient word provokes
Another, not from her, but him;
While she, too gentle even to force
His penitence by kind replies,
Waits by, expecting his remorse,
With pardon in her pitying eyes;
And if he once, by shame oppress’d,
A comfortable word confers,
She leans and weeps against his breast,
And seems to think the sin was hers;
And whilst his love has any life,
Or any eye to see her charms,
At any time, she’s still his wife,
Dearly devoted to his arms;
She loves with the love that cannot tire,
And when, ah woe, she loves alone,
Through passionate duty love springs higher,
As a grass grows taller round the stone.

— first published in 1854 and expanded until 1862, Part I, Book I, Canto IX: I.1–I.12

=== Jane to her mother ===
Mother, it's such a weary strain
The way he has of treating me
As if 'twas something fine to be
A woman; and appearing not
To notice any faults I've got!

— Part II, Book I: XIV.22–XIV.26

== See also ==
- Angel
- Culture of Domesticity
- Femininity
- Ideal womanhood
- Separate spheres
