= Psychology of Women Quarterly =

- Discipline: Psychology, women's studies
- Language: English
- Edited by: Dawn M. Szymanski

Publication details
- History: 1976-present
- Publisher: SAGE Publications
- Frequency: Quarterly
- Impact factor: 2.973 (2017)

Standard abbreviations
- ISO 4: Psychol. Women Q.

Indexing
- CODEN: PWOQDY
- ISSN: 0361-6843 (print); 1471-6402 (web)
- LCCN: 76012952
- OCLC no.: 643627756

Links
- Journal homepage; Online access; Online archive

Psychology of Women Quarterly is a quarterly peer-reviewed academic journal that covers the fields of psychology and women's studies, focusing on the psychological health of women. The journal's editor is Dawn M. Szymanski, PhD (University of Tennessee, Knoxville, TN, United States). It was established in 1976 and is published by SAGE Publications on behalf of the Society for the Psychology of Women, a division of the American Psychological Association.

== Abstracting and indexing ==
The journal is abstracted and indexed in:

- CAB Abstracts
- CINAHL
- Current Contents/Social & Behavioral Sciences
- EBSCO databases
- InfoTrac databases
- International Bibliography of the Social Sciences
- ProQuest databases
- PsycINFO
- Scopus
- Social Sciences Citation Index

According to the Journal Citation Reports, the journal has a 2017 impact factor of 2.973, ranking it 1st out of 42 journals in the category "Women's Studies" and 23rd out of 135 journals in the category "Psychology, Multidisciplinary".
