= Back in the Circus =

Studio album by Jonatha Brooke
- Released: February 24, 2004
- Genre: Folk rock
- Label: Bad Dog/Verve
- Producer: Jonatha Brooke

Jonatha Brooke chronology
Steady Pull (2001)	Back in the Circus (2004)	Careful What You Wish For (2007)

Professional ratings
Review scores
Source	Rating
AllMusic	4/5 stars
PopMatters	(Mixed)

Back in the Circus (2004) is the fourth studio album released by Jonatha Brooke.

The track "Less Than Love Is Nothing", written with Eric Bazilian, is the first co-written song Brooke has included on a solo album. Additionally, this is her first album to feature cover version of other bands' songs: "Fire and Rain", "God Only Knows", and "Eye in the Sky".

== Track listing ==
All songs written by Jonatha Brooke unless otherwise noted.

1. "Back in the Circus" – 4:21
2. "Better After All" – 2:43
3. "It Matters Now" – 3:59
4. "Sleeping with the Light On" – 3:12
5. "Fire and Rain" (James Taylor cover) – 4:13
6. "Everything I Wanted" – 4:11
7. "God Only Knows" (The Beach Boys cover) – 3:00
8. "Less Than Love Is Nothing" (Brooke/Bazilian) – 3:47
9. "Sally" – 3:57
10. "No Net Below" – 3:05
11. "Eye in the Sky" (The Alan Parsons Project cover) – 4:53
