= Dawn M. Szymanski =

American psychologist

- Born: 1967 (age 58–59)

Academic background
- Education: BA, Psychology and Sociology, 1989, State University of New York at Fredonia; MS, Agency Counseling, 1990, Indiana State University; Ed.S., PhD, Counseling Psychology, 2001, Georgia State University
- Thesis: Lesbian internalized homophobia in relation to same-sex relationships, feminist attitudes, and coping resources (2001)

Dawn Marie Szymanski (born 1967) is an American psychologist. She is a Full professor and Editor-In-Chief of the Society for the Psychology of Women's (Division 35 of the American Psychological Association) journal, Psychology of Women Quarterly.

== Early life and education ==
Szymanski was born in 1967. She earned her Bachelor of Arts degree in 1989 with a double major in Psychology and Sociology from State University of New York at Fredonia. From there, Szymanski enrolled at Indiana State University for her Master's degree and Georgia State University for her PhD in Counseling Psychology.

== Career ==
Upon receiving her PhD, Szymanski became an Adjunct professor at Georgia School of Professional Psychology at Argosy University. She left after one year to accept an assistant professor position at the University of Missouri–St. Louis. While working in their community counseling program, Szymanski authored Relationship quality and domestic violence in women's same-sex relationships: The role of minority stress and Does Internalized Heterosexism Moderate the Link Between Heterosexist Events and Lesbians' Psychological Distress? As a result of her research, she received three Psychotherapy with Women awards from the American Psychological Association in 1999, 2002, and 2005.

At the beginning of the 2006 academic year, Szymanski left the University of Missouri–St. Louis to accept an assistant professor and Interim Co-Director position in the University of Tennessee-Knoxville's (UTK) department of psychology. During her tenure at UTK, Szymanski's research focused on developing multicultural-feminist counseling psychology theories and the impact of external and internalized oppression on psychosocial health. In 2009, she received UK's 2009 Chancellor's Honors LGBT Ally Research Award and American Psychological Association (APA) Emerging Leader for Women in Psychology Award. Szymanski was also appointed a consulting editor for the Psychology of Women Quarterly (PWQ) and eventually promoted to associate editor. Szymanski was promoted to a tenured associate professor in UTK's Department of Psychology in 2010 and earned their Angie Warren Perkins Award. She was also elected a fellow of the APA's Division 44, the Society for the Psychological Study of Lesbian, Gay, Bisexual, and Transgender Issues. Following her promotion, Szymanski received the APA's Outstanding Major Contribution Award in the Counseling Psychologist for Sexual Objectification of Women for 2012 and was elected the APA's Woman of the Year.

At the beginning of 2015, Szymanski began to focus on Breastaurants, sexually objectifying environments, and their long-term impact on women's mental and physical health. She co-wrote an article on The Conversation which detailed the link between negative aspects of waitressing at breastaurants and negative emotions such as anxiety, anger, sadness, depressed mood, confusion, and degradation. This led to the publication of a study in 2017 titled Sexually Objectifying Environments: Power, Rumination, and Waitresses’ Anxiety and Disordered Eating. Along with co-author Renee Mikorski, Szymanski found that women who work in breastaurants are at higher risk for anxiety and eating disorders. As a result of her "outstanding contributions in advancing lesbian, bisexual, and transgender women's psychology through research, teaching, practice, and/or activism," she received the APA's 2017 Laura Brown Award.

In 2019, Szymanski was appointed the Editor-In-Chief of the Society for the Psychology of Women's (Division 35 of the American Psychological Association) journal, Psychology of Women Quarterly.
