= Good Wife, Wise Mother =

Traditional ideal for womanhood in East Asia

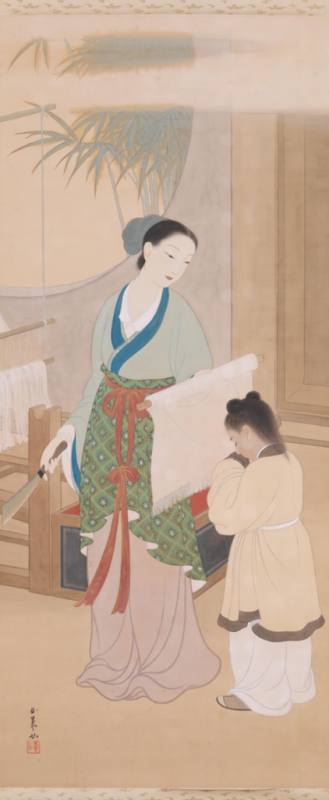
Mencius' Mother Cutting the Loom by Kurihara Gyokuyo, 1921. Such imagery was widely circulated throughout traditional East Asian societies, regarded as a paragon of "maternal instruction", emphasizing the mother's central responsibility within the household for educating children and cultivating virtue, embodying the archetype of a "Wise Mother".

"Good Wife, Wise Mother" is a phrase representing a traditional ideal for womanhood in East Asia, including Japan, China and Korea. First appearing in Japan after the Meiji Restoration, the four-character phrase "Good Wife, Wise Mother" (良妻賢母, ryōsai kenbo) was coined by Nakamura Masanao in a speech on March 16, 1875. The phrase's original meaning was centered on the spiritual belief that women, physically and mentally, had an innate connection to the household and the roles that accompanied it. Even though the Meiji government was redefining the role of women to that of one only in the home, some women were still used for manual labor outside the home. Although the phrase "Good Wife, Wise Mother" came into the picture after the Meiji Restoration, its values had persisted years before in Japan. "Good Wife, Wise Mother" accompanied the existing phrase "Wealthy Country, Strong Army" (富国強兵, fukoku kyōhei). The side by side usages of the phrases was reflected in the transformation of the Imperial family's image, where the Empress would be much more involved in a motherly/ceremonial fashion while having no actual political influence, while the Emperor would possess absolute power. Although the philosophy of "Good Wife, Wise Mother" declined in Japan after World War II, feminist historians have argued it existed as recently as the 1980s.

First appearing in Japan, the concept evolved and found its way to Korea where it was used by the Imperial Japanese Empire to impose Japanese cultural standards on occupied Korea. In Korea, the philosophy of "Good Wife, Wise Mother" was influenced by already present Confucian ideals as well as Protestant religious teachings from the West. These intersections of beliefs created Korea's own version of "Good Wife, Wise Mother" (Ryōsai Kenbo) called Hyonmo Yangcho. The impact of the concept can still be seen today in Korea as well as in the testimonies of Korean immigrants in the US.

This traditional view of women, as both "Wise Wife, Good Mother" and "Wise Mother, Good Wife" (Chinese: 賢母良妻/賢妻良母; pinyin: xián mǔ liáng qī/xián qī liáng mǔ), was similarly shared in Chinese society throughout the early 1900s. On numerous occasions, it was criticized by Chinese academics such as Lu Xun and Zhu Ziqing.

== Japan ==
The phrase Ryōsai Kenbo, which means "Good Wife, Wise Mother", appeared in the latter part Meiji period in the late 19th century as part of the Japanese government's efforts to shape women's roles in society. Throughout this period, the state framed women's domestic labor, which included managing the household, caregiving, and childrearing, as crucial for Japan's progress and social stability. From the late 1890s to the end of World War II, the phrase became increasingly prevalent in mass media. It was also incorporated into the curriculum of many higher levels of public and private girl's schools. During the 1890s, "Good Wife, Wise Mother" was taught only in the higher levels attended by elite, upper-class girls. It became a more official policy engrained in Meiji society after being extended into middle class education in 1895 by education minister Kabayama Sukenori. It was then introduced to elementary schools' curriculum when the 1911 revision of the ethics textbooks came out. Ryōsai Kenbo was taught to promote conservative, nationalistic, and militaristic state policies and to help a developing capitalist economy.

The Meiji and Taishō governments used the Ryōsai Kenbo ideology to regulate women's political activity and social participation. In 1890 and 1900, both governments passed laws prohibiting women from attending political meetings and being involved in organizations. These laws reinforced women's expected social role of attending to duties in the home, rather than in political or public roles. By the 1920s, middle-class women increasingly began to participate in the workforce. Public discourse questioned whether women who worked outside the home could also still fulfill their roles as "good wives and wise mothers".

During the 1930s and World War II, Japan further pushed the idea of Ryōsai Kenbo as part of Japanese nationalism known as "Kazoku Kokkakan" (family-state ideology). The government pushed propaganda emphasizing women's reproductive duty to produce future soldiers. Women were taught to fulfill this role due to nationalism.

Even as labor shortages pulled women into the workforce, with many joining the industrial and factory workforce, government policies still continued to promote motherhood and domestic duties for women. This pull into the workforce, along with the government continuous encouragement of homemaking and motherhood caused contradictions between the demands of industrial capitalism and the state's reliance and push for women fulfilling domestic roles. Between the late Meiji period and 1945, the phrase and ideology of Ryōsai Kenbo became an influential way of shaping the social expectations and roles for women in Japan, tying their duties in the home and motherhood to the country's values, wartime efforts, and economic growth.

== China ==
Traditionally in Chinese feudal society, a wife must consider her husband's family more important than her own. This sentiment is prevalent to this day, particularly in rural areas. The relationship between mother-in-law and daughter-in-law and the relationship between father and son is more important than the relationship between husband and wife. A wife must always be submissive to her husband, and she can neither be offensive nor jealous. The husband has duties outside of the home and the wife has duties inside, and they do not interfere with the tasks of each other. To fulfill the role of "Good Wife, Wise Mother", the woman must educate her children accordingly. Since Chinese families puts emphasis on prosperity, a wife should also not only be fertile, she needs to produce sons and educate them so that they can succeed in society.

== Korea ==
The ideology of "Good Wife, Wise Mother" was very prominent in Korea during the late 19th and early 20th century and was extremely influential in shaping the gender discourse, practices, and the expectations of Korean women. In Korea, it is understood as a transcultural concept that combines Japanese colonial practices in Korea shaped by ryōsai kenbo, the Chosŏn dynasty's Confucuian ideal of pudŏk (womanly virtues), as well as American Protestant woman domesticity that emphasized moral motherhood and femininity centered on the home. They all were centered on the expectation that women were expected to contribute to their families and society in their capacity as wives and mothers.

This ideology emerged in Korea as Joseon Dynasty believed that national strength, prosperity, and defense depended on educated mothers. There was an urgency to appear as a civilized people and because children could not become civilized without guidance, their mothers first had to be civilized. The training of women as a "Good Wife, Wise Mother" through education was key to achieving this. Liberal and socialist women who were described as "New Women" in Korea opposed and challenged this ideological training in education calling it a "slave education" such as Baek Pa who criticized the education for making "polite slaves". The tension was evident, while there were women who openly rejected this ideology, other women such as the highly educated doctor Heo Yeong-suk, embraced it as a pathway to strength and social progress.

== Influence on Korean immigrants ==
While not all Koreans or Korean immigrants deliberately follow Confucian teachings or ryōsai kenbo as a formal ideology, the effects of "Good Wife, Wise Mother" on traditional outlooks on gender and the family have been persistent. Scholars have attempted to uncover the scale of the ideology's influence on Korean immigrants in the United States. Researchers have reviewed contemporary attitudes towards gender in Korean immigrant groups in America and how these attitudes reflect the enduring cultural significance of the ideology of "Good Wife, Wise Mother".

One study, published in 2008, of first-generation immigrant women discovered that the women's emotional response to working away from their homes, upon moving to America, reflected their definition of motherhood and whether they perceived their work as contributing to, or taking them away from, fulfilling the duty of an ideal mother. In this study, the majority of first-generation Korean immigrant women (who came from middle-class backgrounds in Korea) identified 'mother' as the most important personal identity or characteristic. Many middle-class first-generation Korean immigrant women- whose husbands earned enough income to provide for the family- chose not to work but to devote themselves to child rearing and homemaking.

Another study published in 2006 examined the persistence of Korean cultural values in spite of immigration to America. The study found that when exposed to American gender conventions, Korean cultural teachings of 'social harmony' and 'duty' proved to be more rigid, unchanging, and overt. The study inferred that the strong reaction to preserve traditional values and teachings may result from the perceived danger of losing one's heritage to foreign values. Researchers reasoned that because Korean cultural teachings proved to be rigid, this may account for the perseverance of "Good Wife, Wise Mother" in immigrant groups in America. This research indicated that as a result of efforts to preserve traditional Korean values, ideas such as "Good Wife, Wise Mother" have made it more difficult for Korean immigrant women to overcome gender inequality in new immigrant social groups.

== Usage ==
Currently, the phrase has conflicting meanings. While some people use it to refer to a woman having traditional motherly and wife characteristics, many others use it to criticize prejudice against women.

== Criticism ==
For feminists, the idea of "Good Wife, Wise Mother" disguises the real intention of denial of women's equity in education, profession, and marriage.Many women in Japan rejected the idea of "Good Wife, Wise Mother" especially within the realm of education and even petitioned for a better learning system. They desired an education that included aspects outside of the household such as the education men received.After World War I, there was heavy discourse regarding women's right to obtain a secondary education. This was a topic of interest in many official assemblies where slow progress was made allowing women to gradually become more involved in higher education. Their admission process into official schools was not solidified until after World War II.

== See also ==
- Barefoot and pregnant
- Bluestocking (magazine)
- Kinder, Küche, Kirche
- Proverbs 31
- Shōjo
- Three Obediences and Four Virtues
- Women in Japan
- Women in China
- Women in Taiwan
- Women in South Korea
- Yamato nadeshiko
