= Jonatha Brooke =

American singer-songwriter and musician

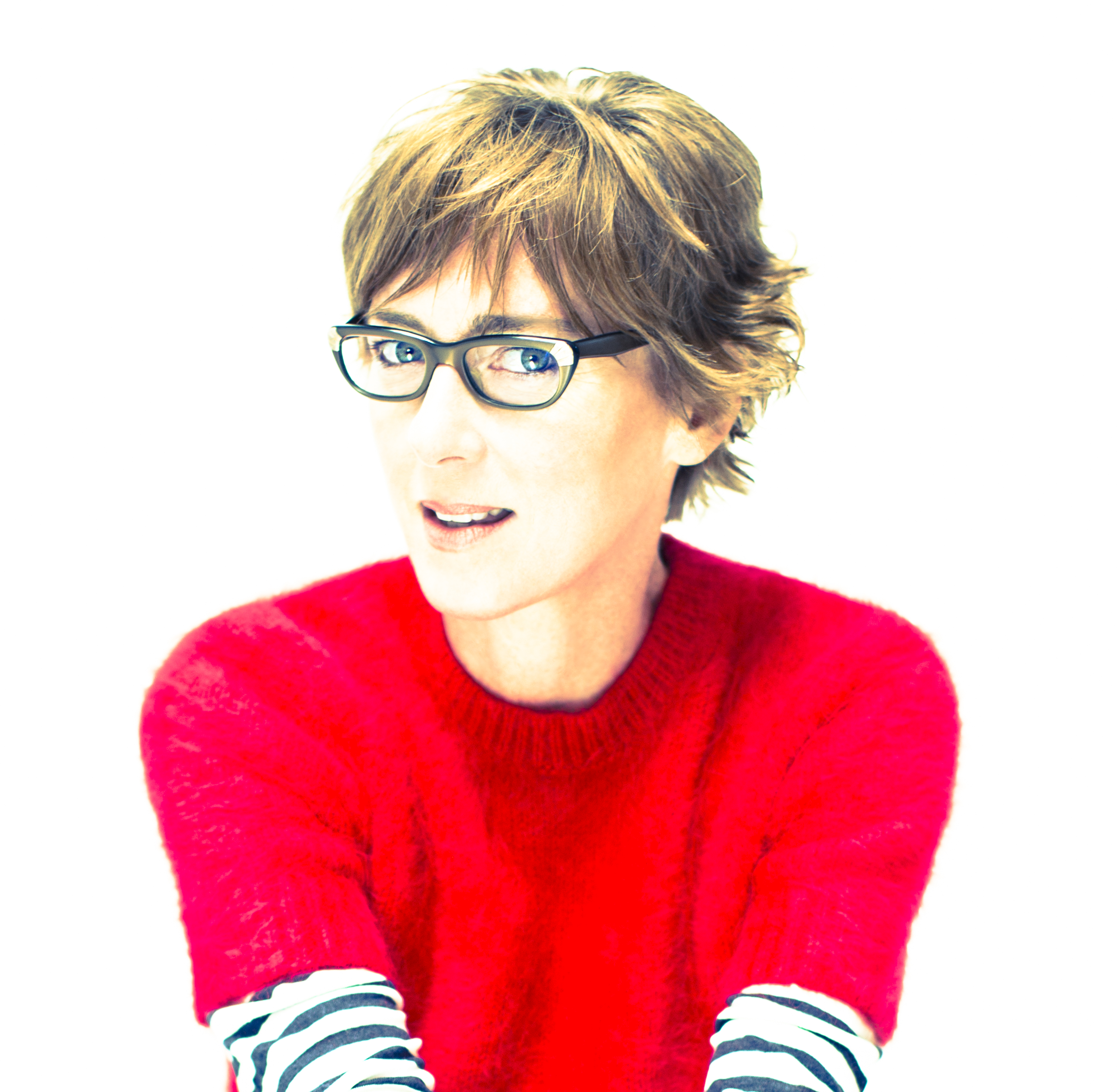
- Press shot by Sandrine Lee

Background information
- Born: Jonatha Brooke; January 23, 1964 (age 62); Illinois, United States
- Genre: Folk rock
- Occupations: Musician, songwriter
- Instruments: Vocals, guitar, piano
- Years active: 1980s–present
- Labels: Bad Dog Records, MCA Records, Elektra, Green Linnet, Rykodisc
- Website: jonathabrooke.com

Jonatha Brooke (born January 23, 1964) is an American folk rock singer-songwriter and guitarist from Massachusetts, United States. Her music merges elements of folk, rock and pop, often with poignant lyrics and complex harmonies. She has been a performer, writer, and artist since the late 1980s, and her songs have been used in television shows and movies.

== Education ==
Jonatha Brooke attended Shady Hill School in Cambridge, Massachusetts, and the Commonwealth School in Boston. She graduated from Amherst College in 1985.

== Career ==
=== Beginnings ===
Jonatha Brooke and fellow Bostonian Jennifer Kimball began playing music together in the 1980s after having met at Amherst College. They performed regularly during their college years. Their folk songs were marked by "witty wordplay and sumptuous pop harmonies," according to one music critic. Another critic suggested Brooke (the duo's principal songwriter) was the creative dynamo behind the team. Another suggested that many artists of this era were inspired by Joni Mitchell to strive for excellent musicianship, singing, and writing. Brooke was sometimes grouped with emerging 1990s talents such as the Indigo Girls, Sheryl Crow, Shawn Colvin, and Mary Chapin Carpenter.

In 1989, the duo played the coffeehouse folk circuit and radio as The Story and were described as an example of the "folk-rock singer-songwriter aesthetic," according to one account. That year they created a demo called Over Oceans. They were signed to the independent label Green Linnet which, in 1991, issued the duo's debut full-length album Grace in Gravity. Later Elektra Records signed The Story and re-issued their debut. Their second album, The Angel in the House, was released in 1993, highlighting their intricate and sometimes dissonant harmonies.

One music critic described their approach as "levity" between heavy songs about "God, church, death, female oppression, self-suppression, mothers and daughters." Their songs adroitly avoided "heavy-handedness" with a certain "winning buoyancy of tune and/or spirit" with "sophisticated harmonic changes whose intriguing hooks come at you cockeyed and sideways more often than they swoop down from the heavens." The duo were compared with artists such as Suzanne Vega and Indigo Girls.

=== Solo career ===
In 1994, Brooke pursued a solo career. One critic described Brooke as having a "lovely soprano voice" and liked the "catchy original melodies and thorny lyrics." On her first solo effort Plumb (1995) People Magazine noted that "Brooke glides through poignant, multifaceted songs with her sweet, insinuating voice. The effect, on limpid compositions such as "Nothing Sacred" and "Inconsolable," is both ravishing and heartbreakingly sad." Her followup 10 Cent Wings earned her a review in Billboard Magazine, which declared that "10 Cent Wings is essential, like taking a deep breath after witnessing something magnificent."

=== Going Independent ===
The changing dynamics of the music business in the middle 1990s had a "sell-or-perish" pattern featuring a "leaner, meaner record industry," as one critic described the industry in the 1990s. "I was in the middle of a national tour [for 10 Cent Wings] when MCA dropped me," Brooke recalled. "One second you're a princess on the throne, and the next week no one will return your phone calls," she commented to a reporter.

She recalled: "I realized nothing had changed. I didn't have a contract with MCA Records, and I didn't have tour support, and I wasn't going to get to make a video, which they had promised. The shows were still sold out, my audience was still there and they didn't care whether or not I was part of the Universal conglomerate. That was a really empowering and reassuring time."

While in her early 30s without backing from a major label, she became known as an industrious "cutting-edge world of do-it-yourself" marketer by using the Internet creatively to reach out to fans. She recorded "Jonatha Brooke Live" (1999) on her own label, Bad Dog Records. At first she sold via the Internet. She packaged and mailed about 2,500 copies and autographed each one for a personal touch. She moved to Malibu in 2000.

Critics wrote mostly positive reviews. One described her as a "down-to-earth poet" with "an apparently inexhaustible supply of anecdotes" and "flawlessly crafted lush backdrops for songs that mused wistfully about love and destiny," although "emotions were often obscured by the complex arrangements and gorgeous vocal harmonies." Another critic described her earlier songs as "introspective, sometimes bleak Joni Mitchell-esque compositions." Another described her music as "contemporary folk".

=== The 2000s ===
Brooke's next album, Steady Pull (2001) reflected "relief and optimism." She again released it on her own label, commenting that there were "still plenty of dark corners on this record, but I wanted to push boundaries." A critic said she opened up more with this album. Her song "New Dress" (with background vocals from Crowded House frontman Neil Finn) was about a newfound romantic bliss. This rock-influenced album was co-produced by Brooke and veteran producer/engineer Bob Clearmountain, best known for his work with artists such as Bryan Adams, Bruce Springsteen, The Rolling Stones, The Corrs, and Hall & Oates. Clearmountain had, at that point, retired from recording and producing artists, focusing solely on mixing music, but came out of that "retirement" specifically to work with Jonatha, who recorded the album at Clearmountain's Mix This! studio. Later, her song "Your House" was included in the ABC series entitled Once and Again. Brooke was featured as a guest vocalist with artists such as Lisa Loeb, Chris Botti and Patty Larkin, and has co-written tracks for Joe Sample's The Pecan Tree.

In 2002, she moved from California to New York and married manager Patrick Rains. She performed two songs on Disney's Return to Never Land (2002) soundtrack, a movie based on the Peter Pan story, contributing her original song "I'll Try" and a cover "The Second Star to the Right".

In 2003, Brooke revamped 1995's song "War" as a protest against the Gulf War. In 2004, she released Back in the Circus with new material plus song covers from songs by The Alan Parsons Project, The Beach Boys, and James Taylor. The album was also released in the United Kingdom in 2005 and combined tracks with several Steady Pull songs. Rolling Stone described it as "stocked with lovingly detailed songs." In August 2006, she released a combination CD and DVD titled Live in New York. In April 2007, Brooke released Careful What You Wish For via Rykodisc distribution. "The vibe of the album," she wrote in notes for reporters, was "all about busting out, being on the edge, playing with great abandon to see what we could come up with."

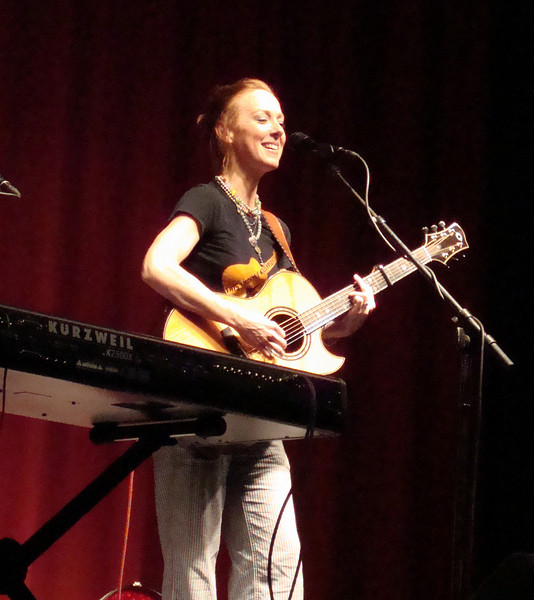
At Woody Guthrie Folk Festival

Some Brooke songs have been sung or covered by other artists. Her tune "Because I Told You So" from Ten Cent Wings was covered by Nick Lachey on his 2006 album What's Left of Me. Her song "Inconsolable" from Plumb was featured in a TV episode of Buffy the Vampire Slayer entitled "Prophecy Girl". Buffy creator Joss Whedon enlisted Brooke to create "What You Don't Know," the theme song for the TV series Dollhouse starring Eliza Dushku. In 2008, Brooke appeared on the Tinker Bell movie soundtrack with the song "Be True." The movie's soundtrack was released on October 14, 2008, a week before the DVD release and contains songs from and inspired by the film. In February 2008, Brooke recorded The Works which was her seventh solo release. This effort was inspired by the music of late folk legend Woody Guthrie. Brooke was invited by Guthrie's daughter Nora to sift through the private archives and hunt through Guthrie's unreleased material for possible adaptations. Brooke said she was "smitten" with Guthrie's work and going through it was like "going to church." She liked his poetic love songs like "My Sweet and Bitter Bowl" and spiritual deeper tunes like "My Battle" and loved Guthrie's "full spectrum of craziness" as she described his writings. Musicisns featured on Brooke's The Works include keyboard player Joe Sample, bassist Christian McBride, drummer Steve Gadd, and pedal steel guitarist Greg Leisz.

One reviewer lauded Brooke's "forceful, girlish voice" and described her tune "My Sweet and Bitter Bowl" as a "driving opener" and "standout" and described the entire suite of songs as "solid." The critic described the album as a "Brooke record" not a "Guthrie one". Another critic described the album as "Woody Guthrie's lyrics" with "an urbane new voice within Brooke's sleek, winking alt-pop ... if the Dust Bowl troubadour had matriculated at Amherst, he'd sound just like this." In 2008, she participated in the music album Songs for Tibet, an initiative to support Tibetan Dalai Lama Tenzin Gyatso. The album was issued on August 5 via iTunes and on August 19 in stores. In 2009, she shared vocal duties with Davy Knowles on the song "Taste of Danger" on the album Coming Up For Air from Davy Knowles & Back Door Slam. Brooke was a judge on the 10th and 11th annual Independent Music Awards. She was also a judge for the 5th and 9th Independent Music Awards. According to Brooke in an interview, her favorite collaboration with other artists was the song "Forgiven" with Chris Botti (in Chris' 2002 CD The Very Best of Chris Botti).

=== The 2010s ===
In 2010, Jonatha Brooke performed as the opening act of the French tour of Nolwenn Leroy, singing songs in English and in French, and joined Nolwenn Leroy for some duets.

In February 2014, Brooke opened in her one-woman play My Mother Has 4 Noses off-Broadway at the Duke Theater in New York City. The play, written by Brooke, recounts in words and music Brooke's relationship with her mother, who suffered from dementia. It earned favorable reviews, including a "NY Times Critics' pick" designation. She released a CD of the same title simultaneously which one reviewer described as "an intimate, string laden album full of warmth and sadness."

In October 2016, Jonatha released the album Midnight. Hallelujah. Recorded at Sweetwater Studios in Fort Wayne, Indiana, and mixed by Bob Clearmountain, the collection features a broader mix of instruments than her previous two albums. Brooke supported the release of the album with tour dates across the United States.

In February 2019, Jonatha Brooke won Overall Grand Prize in the 15th Annual IAMA (International Acoustic Music Awards), as well as Best Female Artist with her song "Put the Gun Down".

Brooke released an EP, Imposter, in 2019. In an interview for the EP, Brooke revealed that she now lives in Minneapolis.

== Discography ==
Jonatha Brooke
Album	Year	Label	Notes	References
Grace in Gravity	1991		part of The Story	
The Angel in the House	1993	Elektra	part of The Story	
Plumb	1995	Blue Thumb	as Jonatha Brooke & The Story; Tommy LiPuma = label owner	
10 Cent Wings	1997	MCA		
Jonatha Brooke Live	1999	Bad Dog Records		
Bleecker Street: Greenwich Village in the 60's	1999	Astor Place	Covered Paul Simon's "Bleecker Street"	
Steady Pull	2001	Bad Dog Records		
Back in the Circus	2004	Bad Dog Records		
Live in New York	2006	Bad Dog Records	CD/DVD set	
Careful What You Wish For	2007	Bad Dog Records		
The Works	2008	Bad Dog Records		
My Mother Has 4 Noses	2014	Bad Dog Records		
Midnight. Hallelujah.	2016	Bad Dog Records		
Imposter (EP)	2019	Bad Dog Records		
The Sweetwater Sessions	2020	Bad Dog / PRA Records	retrospective of Jonatha's tunes for a visceral “live, in the studio” sound	
