= Bob Clearmountain =

American music mixing engineer and producer (born 1953)

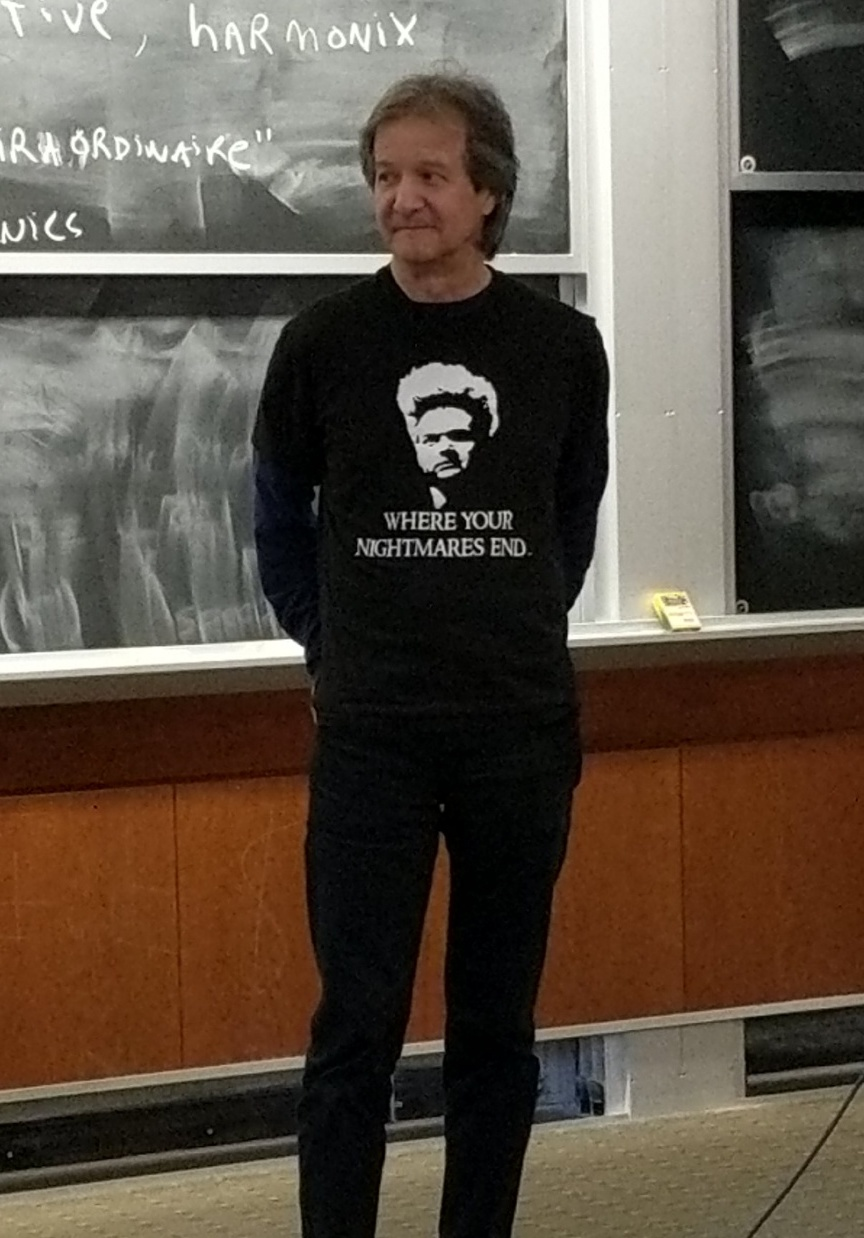
- Clearmountain in 2017
- Born: Bob Chiaramonte; January 15, 1953 (age 73); Connecticut, U.S.
- Occupations: Mixing engineer; producer
- Years active: 1977–present
- Spouse: Betty Bennett
- Awards: Grammy Award for Best Traditional Folk Album; Latin Grammy Award for Best Male Pop Vocal Album; Grammy Award for Best Latin Pop Album

Bob Clearmountain (né Chiaramonte; January 15, 1953) is an American mixing engineer and record producer, best known for his work with major acts, including Bryan Adams, David Bowie, Bon Jovi, Huey Lewis and the News, Roxy Music, the Pretenders, Paul McCartney, Bruce Springsteen, and the Rolling Stones. Described by Sound on Sound magazine as having "his name on more hit records than anyone else in the history of popular music", he is credited with establishing the role of mixing engineer.

Clearmountain has mixed some of the most famous live shows in music history, including Live Aid and The Concert for New York City. Records mixed by Clearmountain have won eight Grammy Awards. He has also won two Emmy Awards from five nominations.

== Early life and education ==
Born in Connecticut, Clearmountain later moved to New York City, where he graduated from Greenwich High School in 1971. As a teenager, Clearmountain had many friends who were musicians. He loved music, and played bass guitar in various bar bands, but felt he did not want his career to depend on other musicians. When a band he was a member of went to Mediasound Studios on 57th Street in New York to record a demo, Clearmountain felt like he could live there. Recognizing his interest in recording, Clearmountain assembled a makeshift home studio with a two-track reel-to-reel tape recorder, some microphones and a talkback. He also loved to make tape recordings of the band's concerts.

== Career ==
=== Mediasound and Power Station ===
Determined to make a career in recording, Clearmountain visited Mediasound frequently and lobbied the studio for a job. He was eventually hired as a gofer in 1972. On his first day working at the studio, after making about two deliveries, he realized that studio staff had been looking for him – they had apparently been expecting him to be working on a recording session as an assistant engineer. The star-struck new assistant engineer found that his first session was with Duke Ellington. Ellington's solo piano session remained unreleased until 2017, when Storyville Records released it as An Intimate Piano Session. At Mediasound, Clearmountain engineered albums for Kool & the Gang. He also played bass on the Dead Boys' first album, Young, Loud and Snotty (1977), before Jeff Magnum rejoined the group.

In 1977, Clearmountain was approached by his Mediasound co-worker, Tony Bongiovi, who had decided to build his own recording studio. Clearmountain became part of Bongiovi's team that designed and opened Power Station, with Clearmountain becoming the studio's Chief Engineer. Clearmountain worked exclusively at the Power Station over the next two or three years, working with artists including The Rezillos, Narada Michael Walden, and others. During this time, he recorded several hit albums for the Nile Rodgers/Bernard Edwards project Chic and Sister Sledge's hit album We Are Family, which established his reputation as a mixing engineer. Clearmountain soon found himself being sought out specifically as a mixing engineer, with the Rolling Stones requesting Clearmountain to mix their single, "Miss You", and Roxy Music having him remix their single "Dance Away". During this time, Clearmountain began mixing on Yamaha NS-10 monitors, which later became a standard studio reference worldwide. Although he is often credited with introducing them to professional use, Clearmountain has said the recommendation came from fellow Power Station engineer Bill "Bear" Scheniman, who had used the speakers on a prior session at Motown Studios in Los Angeles.

=== Independence and success ===
Around 1979, Clearmountain became independent, working at various studios in addition to Power Station. Artists he had worked with brought him back, and he mixed Roxy Music's Flesh and Blood (1980) and Avalon (1982), and the Rolling Stones' Tattoo You (1981) (including engineering vocals and overdubs for "Start Me Up"), as well as their live album, Still Life (1982).

Clearmountain also began both mixing and producing with Bryan Adams on his 1981 album You Want It You Got It, beginning a longstanding professional collaboration between the two that continued through Cuts Like a Knife and Adams' rise to mainstream popularity, and decades beyond.

In late 1982, when David Bowie chose Nile Rodgers to produce his next album, Clearmountain was chosen to engineer the sessions at Power Station. The resulting album, Let's Dance (1983) was a worldwide commercial success. The same year, Clearmountain mixed Huey Lewis and the News' album Sports. The following year, he produced and mixed Hall & Oates' Big Bam Boom and mixed Bruce Springsteen's landmark album Born in the U.S.A.. In 1985, he mixed Live Aid.

He continued to mix new albums for Springsteen and Bowie, and worked with Jimmy Iovine, co-producing Simple Minds' Once Upon a Time (1985) and the Pretenders' Get Close (1986). In 1987, having established himself as a top mixing engineer, he mixed INXS's album Kick (1987), Robbie Robertson's debut solo album, and albums for Crowded House and Divinyls.

=== 1990s ===
In the early 1990s, EastWest Sounds partnered with Clearmountain to release two commercially successful Bob Clearmountain Drum sample libraries, and Clearmountain developed SessionTools, a studio management application. In 1991, after Clearmountain had mixed 21 tracks for the Guns N' Roses albums Use Your Illusion I and Use Your Illusion II, the band decided to scrap the mixes and start over with engineer Bill Price. Clearmountain continued to work with Adams, Springsteen, Rolling Stones, and INXS, and mixed albums for Bryan Ferry, the Who, Dire Straits, Aimee Mann, the Corrs, Jonatha Brooke, Melissa Etheridge, Counting Crows and others.

== Mix This! Studio ==
In 1994, Clearmountain built Mix This!, a private recording studio located in the basement of his home in the Pacific Palisades neighborhood of Los Angeles. Clearmountain later upgraded the studio to Dolby Atmos, and used it for immersive album mixes of Roxy Music's Avalon and Simple Minds' Sparkle in the Rain.

On January 8, 2025, the studio and the residence in which it was located were both destroyed by the Palisades Fire. The rebuilt studio, named Mix This! FTA (From The Ashes), was completed in August 2025 and is now located in a residence behind Apogee Electronics’ headquarters in Santa Monica, California.

== Personal life ==
Clearmountain is married to Apogee Electronics CEO Betty Bennett.

== Production discography ==
=== Selection of work as producer ===
- Bryan Adams - You Want It You Got It (1981), Cuts Like a Knife (1983), Reckless (1984) and Into the Fire (1987)
- Jonatha Brooke - Steady Pull (2001) and Careful What You Wish For (2007)
- The Church - The Blurred Crusade (1982)
- Hall & Oates - Big Bam Boom (1984)
- Paul McCartney - Tripping the Live Fantastic (1990)
- The Pretenders - Get Close (1986)
- Simple Minds - Once Upon a Time (1985)
- The Who - Join Together (1990)
- Michael Stanley Band - You Can't Fight Fashion (1983)
- Various - Woodstock 94 (1994)
- The Silencers - Rock 'N' Roll Enforcers (1980)
- The Rolling Stones - Shine a Light (2008)

=== Selection of work as live mixer/engineer ===
| Date | Concert | Location |
|---|---|---|
| July 13, 1985 | Live Aid | John F. Kennedy Stadium, Philadelphia, Pennsylvania |
| June 11, 1988 | Nelson Mandela 70th Birthday Tribute Concert | Wembley Stadium, London, UK |
| August 24, 1989 | The Who - Tommy | Universal Amphitheatre, Los Angeles, California |
| May 5, 1990 | A Tribute to John Lennon | The Pier Head, Liverpool, UK |
| August 12-14, 1994 | Woodstock 94 | Winston Farm, Saugerties, New York |
| March 15, 1999 | Rock & Roll Hall of Fame Induction Ceremony | Waldorf-Astoria Hotel, New York, New York |
| December 12, 2012 | 12-12-12: The Concert for Sandy Relief | Madison Square Garden, New York, New York |
| September 3, 2022 | Foo Fighters Taylor Hawkins Tribute Concert | Wembley Stadium, London, UK |
| September 27, 2022 | Foo Fighters Taylor Hawkins Tribute Concert | Kia Forum, Los Angeles, California |
| November 5, 2022 | Rock & Roll Hall of Fame Induction Ceremony | Microsoft Theater, Los Angeles, California |
| November 3, 2023 | Rock & Roll Hall of Fame Induction Ceremony | Barclays Center, Brooklyn, New York |
| January 30, 2025 | FireAid Benefit Concert | Kia Forum, Los Angeles, California |

=== KCRW Apogee Sessions ===
In 2005, Clearmountain collaborated with Apogee Electronics to convert unused space in the company's Santa Monica headquarters into Apogee Studio, a recording studio and performance venue. Beginning in 2010, Santa Monica radio station KCRW began hosting live music performances in the venue, called KCRW Apogee Sessions and later KCRW Live from Apogee Studio, with Clearmountain handling the mixing and recording. Artists for these KCRW sessions have included David Gray, Ryan Adams, Chrissie Hynde, Patti Smith, Vampire Weekend, Nick Cave and the Bad Seeds, Regina Spektor, Glen Hansard, the Shins, k.d. lang, Shelby Lynne, Leon Bridges, Norah Jones, the Avett Brothers, Mayer Hawthorne, Alabama Shakes, Belle & Sebastian, John Legend, Beck, John Mayer, Common, and Queens of the Stone Age. In 2024, Cory Henry recorded his album Live at the Piano at the studio; the first recorded there to receive a Grammy Award nomination.

== Awards and recognition ==
Clearmountain has won multiple Grammy and Emmy awards.

In 1991, he was awarded the TEC Awards Les Paul Award, honoring "individuals or institutions that have set the highest standards of excellence in the creative application of audio technology." The following year, Clearmountain was awarded the TEC Lifetime Achievement Award.

In 2023, he was awarded the Music Producers Guild Icon Award for "a person seen to be an icon of the recording industry."

In 2025, he was awarded an honorary doctorate from BerkleeNYC at their class of 2025 graduation ceremony."

=== Grammy Awards & nominations ===
| Year | Work | Artist | Role | Award/Nomination |
|---|---|---|---|---|
| 1992 | Storyville | Robbie Robertson | Mixing Engineer | Nominee - Best Engineered Album - Non-Classical |
| 1994 | Rhythm, Country And Blues | Various | Mixing Engineer | Nominee - Best Engineered Album - Non-Classical |
| 1997 | Blue Moon Swamp | John Fogerty | Mixing Engineer | Nominee - Best Engineered Album - Non-Classical |
| 1998 | Firecracker | Lisa Loeb | Mixing Engineer | Nominee - Best Engineered Album - Non-Classical |
| 2005 | Avalon | Roxy Music | Mixing Engineer | Nominee - Best Surround Sound Album |
| 2006 | We Shall Overcome - The Seeger Sessions | Bruce Springsteen | Mixing Engineer | Winner - Best Traditional Folk Album |
| 2011 | Paraíso Express | Alejandro Sanz | Mixing Engineer | Winner Latin Grammy - Best Male Pop Vocal Album |
| 2011 | Paraíso Express | Alejandro Sanz | Mixing Engineer | Winner - Best Latin Pop Album |
| 2019 | The Savior | A Bad Think | Mixing Engineer | Nominee - Best Immersive Audio Album |
| 2024 | Avalon | Roxy Music | Mixing Engineer | Nominee - Best Immersive Audio Album |

=== Emmy Awards & nominations ===
| Year | Work | Role | Award/Nomination |
|---|---|---|---|
| 2023 | Taylor Hawkins Tribute Concert | Mixer | Nominee - Outstanding Sound Mixing For A Variety Series Or Special |
| 2021 | Bruce Springsteen's Letter To You - Apple TV | Mixer | Nominee - Outstanding Sound Mixing For A Variety Series Or Special |
| 2015 | The Saturday Night Live 40th Anniversary Special - NBC | Mixer | Winner - Outstanding Sound Mixing For A Variety Series Or Special |
| 2010 | The 25th Anniversary Rock And Roll Hall Of Fame Concert - HBO | Mixer | Winner - Outstanding Sound Mixing For A Variety Or Music Series Or Special |
| 2001 | Bruce Springsteen & The E Street Band - HBO | Mixer | Nominee - Outstanding Sound Mixing For A Variety Or Music Series Or Special |
| 1993 | MTV Unplugged - MTV | Mixer | Nominee - Outstanding Individual Achievement in Sound Mixing For A Variety Or Music Series Or Special |
