= Ideal womanhood =

Idealized feminine traits

Ideal womanhood is a subjective evaluation of idealised feminine traits in women.

== The concept of the "ideal woman" ==
The term is applied in the context of various times and cultures, for example:

- The "Four Women of Paradise" are considered ideal models of virtue in Islam. They are Khadijah, first wife of Muhammad; Fatima, daughter of Muhammad and Khadijah, and wife of Ali; Mary, mother of Jesus; and Asiya, wife of the Pharaoh and adoptive mother of Moses.
  - Some others often upheld as models of ideal womanhood include the matriarch Hagar, mother of Ishmael; Bilqis, the Queen of Sheba; and Eve.
  - For Sunni Muslims, Aisha is revered as a figure of particular importance. However, Aisha is generally viewed unfavourably by Shia Muslims.
- Sita as the ideal Hindu or Indian woman
- Penelope, wife of Odysseus in the Odyssey, described as the ideal woman of ancient Greek society, "the embodiment of chastity, generosity, cunning, and intelligence"
- The concept of the English rose, which refer to ideals of feminine beauty, manners, and temperament as they relate to concepts of Englishness or Britishness.
- Queen Victoria as the ideal Victorian era woman
- Proverbs 31 woman: "wife of noble character", as described in the Old Testament book of Proverbs, skilled in both household management and trade
- Mary, mother of Jesus as an ideal of both virgin and mother - a concept with some pervasiveness in Latin America (see Marianismo).
- the "ideal woman" stereotype of the 1950s, described by Betty Friedan in The Feminine Mystique as defined by "sexual passivity, male domination, and nurturing maternal love"
- The concept of the Yamato nadeshiko in pre-modern Japan.

== Examples ==
A great deal of writing has been done on the subject. The subject of the Ideal Woman has been treated humorously, theologically, and musically.

Examples of "ideal women" are portrayed in literature, for example:

- Sophie, a character in Jean-Jacques Rousseau's Emile: or, On Education (book V) who is raised to be the perfect wife.
- Lucretia as depicted by Benjamin Britten in The Rape of Lucretia.
- Sylvia, in William Shakespeare's poem Who is Sylvia?

Many books have been written on the subject of the Ideal Woman.

== See also ==
- The Angel in the House – 1854 narrative poem by Coventry Patmore
- Culture of Domesticity – 19th-century value system for American women
- Good Wife, Wise Mother – Traditional ideal for womanhood in East Asia
- Manic Pixie Dream Girl – Female stock character who acts as a love interest
- María Clara – Fictional character
- Mary Sue – Overly competent fictional character
- Role engulfment
- Yamato nadeshiko – Term for an ideal Japanese woman
