= East Hampton =

East Hampton or its variants may refer to:

== Places in the United States ==
- East Hampton, Connecticut, a New England town
  - East Hampton (CDP), Connecticut, the central village in the town
- Easthampton, Massachusetts, a city
- Eastampton Township, New Jersey
- East Hampton (town), New York
  - East Hampton (village), New York, in the town of East Hampton

== Other uses ==
- Easthampton, Herefordshire, England
- USS East Hampton (SP-573), a United States Navy patrol vessel from 1917 to 1919

== See also ==
- Hampton East, Victoria
- Hampton (disambiguation)
