= Homer in the Gloamin' =

Home run hit by Gabby Hartnett

The Homer in the Gloamin' is one of the most famous home runs in baseball folklore, hit by Gabby Hartnett of the Chicago Cubs near the end of the 1938 Major League Baseball season. A play on the popular song "Roamin' in the Gloamin'", the phrase may have first been written by Associated Press reporter Earl Hilligan in a story about the game.

== The play ==
The Pittsburgh Pirates had led the National League for much of the 1938 season, but when the final month of the season came, the Pirates began to falter. By the time they came to Chicago late in September for a three-game series, the Pirates led the Chicago Cubs by just one and a half games. The Cubs won the first game of the series 2–1, behind the pitching of Dizzy Dean, who a year after an arm injury was past his prime. Dean relied on his experience and grit to defeat the Pirates and would later call it the greatest outing of his career. The victory cut the Pirates' lead to a half game and set the stage for one of baseball's most memorable moments.

The game on September 28 started at 3:00 pm CT. It was 5:30 pm when it reached the bottom of the ninth inning with the score tied at five runs apiece and the sun setting at 5:37 pm according to that day's Chicago Daily Tribune. Darkness was descending on a Wrigley Field that would not have artificial lighting for another 50 years. At the time, the rules did not provide for suspending a game due to darkness, so the game would either be finished that night—or replayed the following day in its entirety. Player-manager Hartnett came to bat with two outs in the bottom of the ninth inning. With a count of 0 balls and 2 strikes, Hartnett connected on a Mace Brown pitch, launching the ball into the darkness. As it flew toward the left-center field bleachers for a game-winning home run, the stadium erupted into pandemonium. Players and fans stormed the field to escort Hartnett around the bases.

== Aftermath ==
The homer vaulted the Cubs into first place. They won the next day's game over the Pirates 10–1, completing a three-game sweep, and clinched the pennant in St. Louis three days later. The Cubs finished their season 89–63, with the Pirates two games behind at 86–64. They were swept in the 1938 World Series by the New York Yankees, their fourth World Series loss in ten years.

For the Pirates, 1938 marked the closest they would come to going to the World Series between 1927 and 1960. The team slipped to sixth place the following year, with average seasons in the early 1940s and a late pennant race in 1948 only to become one of baseball's worst teams from 1949 until 1956, not contending for the National League pennant again until the late 1950s.

"Roamin' in the Gloamin'" was a popular song dating to 1911, written and recorded by Harry Lauder. "Gloaming" is a regional dialect term of Scots origin denoting "twilight". Writers picked up on these facts and Hartnett's clutch hit became known in Cubs lore as the "Homer in the Gloamin'".
