= Careful What You Wish For (Jonatha Brooke album) =

Studio album by Jonatha Brooke
- Released: April 3, 2007
- Genre: Folk rock
- Label: Bad Dog Records
- Producer: Jonatha Brooke

Jonatha Brooke chronology
Back in the Circus (2004)	Careful What You Wish For (2007)	The Works (2008)

Professional ratings
Review scores
Source	Rating
AllMusic	2.5/5 stars
PopMatters	3/10 stars

Careful What You Wish For is Jonatha Brooke's fifth studio album, released in 2007.

== Track listing ==
1. "Careful What You Wish For" – 3:59
2. "Beautiful Girl" – 4:04
3. "Keep the River on your Right" – 3:49
4. "I'll Leave the Light On" – 3:51
5. "Baby Wait" – 3:43
6. "Hearsay" – 3:00
7. "Forgiven" – 5:11
8. "Je N'Peux Pas Te Plaire" – 3:40
9. "Prodigal Daughter" – 4:07
10. "After the Tears" – 4:27
11. "Never Too Late for Love" – 2:40
