= Yamato nadeshiko =

Term for an ideal Japanese woman

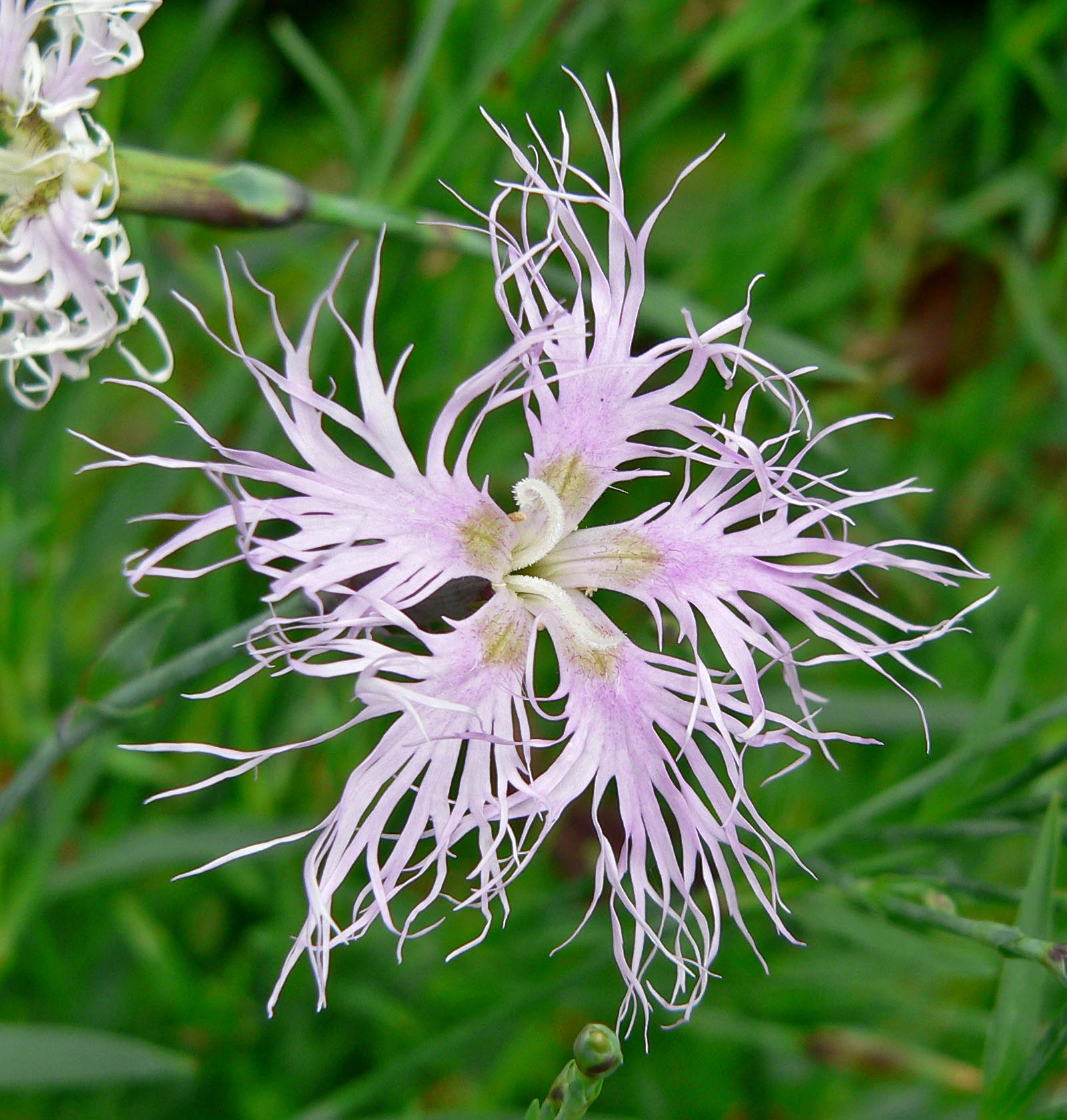
Dianthus superbus

Yamato nadeshiko (やまとなでしこ or 大和撫子) is a Japanese term meaning the "personification of an idealized Japanese woman." The term is the archetype of conservative and traditional femininity.

== Name origin and connotations ==
Yamato (大和) was an ancient name for Japan and, therefore, has nationalistic connotations. The name also contains a floral metaphor. The word nadeshiko refers to Dianthus superbus, a frilled pink carnation. The word nadeshiko (撫子) also means beloved or dear child (lit. "child being petted"). The combination of these two meanings indicates a flower of the Japanese nation, that is, a standard of female beauty that is uniquely Japanese.

While the term refers to the Japanese ideals of femininity, possessing grace and beauty, it also describes the Yamato nadeshiko's inner strength. She exhibits delicacy and deference, as well as quiet determination. Both dignified and modest, the Yamato nadeshiko is believed to embody characteristics of delicacy and fragility, as well as elegance and sturdiness. Though outwardly submissive and obedient, she is internally strong. As the Yamato nadeshiko is one of mature character, she has a nurturing yet uncompromising personality.

== Modern use of the term ==
The term Yamato nadeshiko is often used to describe a demure young woman and, in a contemporary context, nostalgically of women with good traits which are perceived as being increasingly rare.

=== Modern media ===
Though Yamato nadeshiko is no longer considered an ideal for women to reach for, it is still referenced in pop culture media such as novels, manga, anime, TV dramas, and movies. It is typically used to refer to female characters that possess traits of maturity, modesty, gentleness, grace, uncompromising determination, while also being nurturing.

The Yamato nadeshiko character type is often portrayed in anime. Attractive due to having a more mature personality than the other characters, she is often slightly older, sometimes even represented as a teacher or a mother. Her appeal lies in her sexual maturity and traditional Japanese virtues of a caring yet subservient nature.

=== Nadeshiko Japan (なでしこジャパン) ===
The official nickname of the Japan women's national football team is Nadeshiko Japan (なでしこジャパン), which was derived from Yamato nadeshiko.

Despite being more successful than their male counterparts, Samurai Blue (サムライ・ブルー), Nadeshiko Japan gets significantly less recognition; instead, the media trivializes their impressive skills and success by emphasizing the femininity of the members of Nadeshiko Japan. For example, although they emerged as champions at the 2011 FIFA World Cup, the team was bombarded with comments about their "femininity" or "lack thereof."

In order to combat the assumed incompatibility of sports and women, in 2004 the Japanese Football Association chose the nickname based on a contest of around 2,700 entries. It was chosen because it embodies femininity and athleticism, features presented in the media as contradictory, as well as a nationalistic identity. The team's decision to keep the name was to promote the "hidden image" of strength and boldness that the Yamato nadeshiko possesses.

== See also ==
- Culture of Domesticity
- English rose (epithet)
- Eternal feminine
- Gentlewomen
- Good Wife, Wise Mother
- Ideal womanhood
- María Clara
- Marianismo
- R. Mika, who has a wrestling partner named Yamato Nadeshiko
- Seven Heavenly Virtues
- Yamato-damashii

== External links and references ==
- sci.lang.japan FAQ: What is Yamato Nadeshiko
