= The Story (American band) =

American folk-rock duo

- Origin: Boston, Massachusetts, U.S.
- Genres: Folk-rock
- Years active: 1989–1994
- Labels: Green Linnet, Elektra
- Past members: Jonatha Brooke; Jennifer Kimball

The Story was an early 1990s American folk-rock duo composed of Jonatha Brooke and Jennifer Kimball.

== History ==
Jonatha Brooke and Jennifer Kimball met in 1981 while they were first-year students at Amherst College in Amherst, Massachusetts. Originally called simply "Jonatha and Jennifer", they performed regularly throughout the Boston area until graduation, at which time Brooke started working in a dance company and Kimball went to a publishing firm.

In 1989, the duo recorded a demo, Over Oceans, and were quickly signed by Green Linnet Records. They changed their name to The Story, and their debut album Grace in Gravity was released in 1991. Elektra Records then signed the band, reissuing the album a year later. The Angel in the House followed in 1993, and was called "one of the most impressive, affecting and enduring albums of the year" by The Washington Post. A year later, The Story dissolved.

Known for their ethereal and dissonant vocal harmonies, both Brooke and Kimball have gone on to critically acclaimed solo careers. Although The Story's work has been highly regarded by critics and fans alike, both Brooke and Kimball have individually downplayed the band's work.

== Discography ==
- 1991 Grace in Gravity
- 1993 The Angel in the House
