= Roamin' in the Gloamin' =

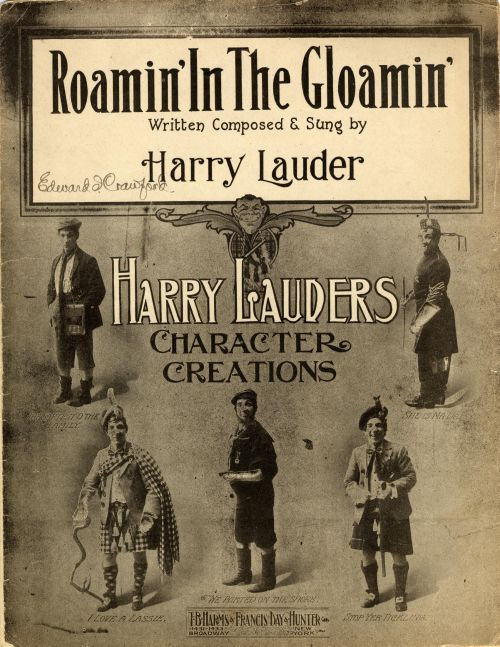
- Cover, sheet music, 1911

Song
- Language: Scots
- Published: 1911
- Songwriter: Harry Lauder

"Roamin' in the Gloamin'" is a popular song written by Harry Lauder in 1911. The song tells of a man and his sweetheart courting in the evening (gloaming). The title comes from the chorus:

Roamin' in the gloamin' on the bonnie banks o' Clyde.
Roamin' in the gloamin' wi' my lassie by my side.
When the sun has gone to rest,
That's the time that we love best.
O it's lovely roamin' in the gloamin'.

The song was a hit for Lauder in both his music hall shows and his 1912 recording. It has been recorded numerous times since, including an updated version by Bing Crosby and Rosemary Clooney in their 1965 album That Travelin' Two-Beat.

== In popular culture ==
Gabby Hartnett's clutch home run for Chicago Cubs late in the 1938 baseball season, when the game was at risk of being called on account of darkness, was dubbed the "Homer in the Gloamin'".

The song was sung by Harry Coombes (played by Art Carney) to his beloved cat Tonto as Tonto passes away near the end of Harry and Tonto (1974)

The song is referenced in the Ray Bradbury short story, "There Was An Old Lady" from the collection of short stories entitled "The October Country."

Parodied in the English-language translations of the Asterix books, as "Roman in the Gloamin".

== Bibliography ==
- Lauder, Harry. "Roamin' In The Gloamin'" (sheet music). New York: T.B. Harms & Francis Day & Hunter (1911).
- Szasz, Ferenc Morton. Scots in the North American West, 1790-1917. Norman, OK: University of Oklahoma Press (2000).
