= The Angel in the House (album) =

Studio album by The Story
- Released: 1993
- Genre: Folk-pop
- Label: Elektra
- Producer: Alain Mallet, Ben Wittman

The Story chronology
Grace in Gravity (1991)	The Angel in the House (1993)

The Angel in the House is the second album by the folk-pop duo the Story, released in 1993.

== Critical reception ==
Professional ratings
Review scores
Source	Rating
AllMusic	4/5 stars

The Boston Globe noted that "the album's 12 songs cover ground quickly, tripping through Latin-flavored upbeat pop, then reversing to dwell upon the inner questions that torment sufferers of eating disorders." The Washington Post wrote that "once again we find the duo's Jonatha Brooke and Jennifer Kimball mining a mostly dark vein of ballads, but the lyrics are more complex, the arrangements more sophisticated." The New York Times concluded that "both Ms. Brooke's lyrics and the album's moody jazz and Brazilian-flavored arrangements owe a debt to [Joni] Mitchell's late 1970's albums, especially Hejira."

AllMusic called the songs "beautifully arranged and well-orchestrated tale[s] of longing, love, and/or loss."

== Track listing ==
All songs written by Jonatha Brooke except where mentioned.

1. So Much Mine - 4:18
2. Missing Person Afternoon - 3:34
3. The Gilded Cage - 6:04
4. When Two and Two are Five - 4:32
5. At the Still Point - 4:48
6. The Angel in the House (Duke Levine, Jonatha Brooke) - 5:02
7. Mermaid - 4:21
8. The Barefoot Ballroom - 5:35
9. In the Gloaming - 3:18 (Meta Orred, Annie Fortescue Harrison) - 3:18
10. Fatso - 4:10
11. Love Song - 5:26
12. Amelia - 5:15
13. Fatso, Part 2: Yo Estoy Bien Asi (Alex Alvear) - 1:58
