= Masashi Daidōji =

Japanese far-left militant

- Born: 5 June 1948; Kushiro, Hokkaidō
- Died: 24 May 2017 (aged 68)
- Education: Hosei University
- Organization: East Asia Anti-Japan Armed Front
- Notable work: Hara Hara Tokei
- Spouse: Ayako Daidōji
- Penalty: Death

Masashi Daidōji (大道寺将司, Daidōji Masashi) (5 June 1948 – 24 May 2017) was a Japanese far-left militant who founded the East Asia Anti-Japan Armed Front and formulated the group's ideology, anti-Japaneseism. Following the group's bombing of the Mitsubishi Heavy Industries headquarters in 1974, Daidōji was arrested, and sentenced to death for his role in the bombing. Daidōji remained on death row until he died of natural causes in 2017.

== Early life ==
Daidōji was born in the city of Kushiro on 5 June 1948. His father was a civil servant who worked in occupied Manchuria.

While Daidōji was a high school student, he witnessed discrimination against his Ainu classmates, an experience which would shape his worldview.

While he was a student at Hosei University, Daidōji had experience working alongside day labourers in the Sanya district of Tokyo.

== East Asia Anti-Japan Armed Front ==
=== Study group ===
At Hosei University, Daidōji organised study sessions on the history of Japanese imperialism with several other students, with whom Daidōji would form the East Asia Anti-Japan Armed Front (EAAJAF). During these study sessions, the group members investigated how Japanese companies such as Mitsubishi benefited from the use of forced labour in Japanese-occupied Korea.

=== Anti-Japaneseism ===
Daidōji had a key role in developing the ideology of the EAAJAF, anti-Japaneseism, which asserts that all Japanese people are complicit in Japanese imperialism, as outlined by Daidōji:

Japanese people are all people of the main country of Japanese imperialism. We recognize that even those who are exploited by capitalists and oppressed by authority have a structural relationship of being aggressors toward the oppressed peoples of Asia, Africa, and Latin America. Recognizing that Japanese people who thought of themselves as victims are actually aggressors: that is the basis of 'anti-Japan'.

=== Mitsubishi Heavy Industries bombing ===
At 12:10 p.m. of 30 August 1974, Daidōji and fellow EAAJAF member Toshiaki Kataoka caught a taxi to Marunouchi, where the Mitsubishi Heavy Industries headquarters was located. Upon arriving, Daidōji took two containers containing a total of 40 kilograms of explosives, and placed these containers in front of the building. Despite a telephoned warning to the staff at the Mitsubishi headquarters by EAAJAF member Norio Sasaki, the area was not evacuated in time, and the bombs exploded at 12:45 p.m., killing 8 people and wounding almost 400.

== Arrest and conviction ==
Daidōji, along with several other EAAJAF members were arrested on 19 May 1975 for their bombing campaign.

In 1987, Daidōji, along with Toshiaki Masunaga, were sentenced to death by the Supreme Court for the 1974 Mitsubishi Heavy Industries bombing. In response to receiving the death penalty, Daidōji appealed multiple times for a retrial.

Daidōji died on 24 May 2017, at the age of 68, from multiple myeloma.
