= Ayako Daidōji =

Japanese far-left militant and fugitive

- 大道寺 あや子
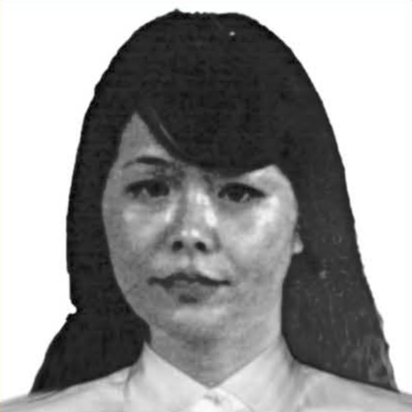
- Born: 20 October 1948 (age 77); Kushiro, Hokkaido, Japan
- Education: Hoshi University
- Organization(s): East Asia Anti-Japan Armed Front (1972–1975); Japanese Red Army (1979 onwards)
- Spouse: Masashi Daidōji

Ayako Daidōji (Japanese: 大道寺 あや子, romanized: Daidōji Ayako, born 20 October 1948) is a Japanese far-left militant and fugitive.

She was initially a member of the East Asia Anti-Japan Armed Front (EAAJAF), and was married to the group's leader Masashi Daidōji. Following the 1974 Mitsubishi Heavy Industries bombing, Daidoji was arrested for her involvement, but was subsequently released as part of a hostage exchange following the hijacking of JAL Flight 472 by the Japanese Red Army.

Following her release, Daidoji joined the Japanese Red Army and still remains at large. Her whereabouts are unknown.

== Early life and education ==
Ayako Daidoji (maiden name Komazawa) was born Kushiro, Hokkaido on 20 October 1948. She attended Kushiro Koryo High School, where she was the valedictorian.

Following her high school graduation, she was admitted to Hoshi University, where she studied pharmacy.

== East Asia Anti-Japan Armed Front ==
=== Founding of the EAAJAF ===
In the early 1970s, Ayako met Masashi Daidoji, who was a student at Hosei University. Masashi Daidoji and several other students from Hosei University had formed a study group dedicated to the study of Japanese imperialism. The study group would evolve into the militant group East Asia Anti-Japan Armed Front (EAAJAF), adhering to the ideology of Anti-Japaneseism.

Anti-Japaneseism was a radical ideology which asserted that all Japanese people were complicit in Japanese imperialism, and that the Japanese working class were the "limbs of Japanese imperialism". This anti-working class position put the EAAJAF at odds with the majority of the Japanese New Left.

Ayoko married Masashi and moved into an apartment with him in Tokyo, adopting his last name Daidoji.

As a member of the EAAJAF, Daidoji obtained chemicals from her workplace, which the group used to make explosives.

=== 1974 Mitsubishi Heavy Industries Bombing ===
On 30 August 1974, members of the Wolf Cell of the EAAJAF placed two homemade bombs at the entrance of Mitsubishi Heavy Industries' head office in Marunouchi, Tokyo. During the operation, Ayako was given the role of being a lookout. The subsequent explosion left 8 people dead and almost 400 wounded.

One month after the bombing, the EAAJAF released a statement claiming responsibility for the bombing, in which the casualties of the bombing were denounced as "colonial parasites".

=== Arrest ===
On 19 May 1975, several members of the EAAJAF were arrested, including Daidoji. She attempted to ingest poison before being arrested, but failed.

== Release from imprisonment and later life ==
=== Release ===
On 28 September 1977, five members of the Japanese Red Army (JRA) hijacked JAL Flight 472, shortly after the plane took off from Mumbai, en route from Paris to Tokyo. The JRA members forced the plane to land at Dhaka International Airport, where the hijackers began negotiations with a team of government representatives led by Air Vice Marshal A.G. Mahmud.

The JRA hijackers managed to secure the release of six prisoners held in Japan, including Daidoji, who were transported to Dhaka International Airport on 2 October 1977 by a chartered flight. Subsequently, the JRA released 118 hostages and flew to Algeria, where the remaining hostages were freed, and the plane was impounded by the authorities.

=== Later life ===
Following her release, Daidoji joined the Japanese Red Army in 1979.

In 2019, the Japanese police released a new wanted poster for Daidoji, declaring that she is still at large. Her whereabouts are unknown.
