= Ainu Revolution Theory =

Theory in Japanese left-wing thought

Map showing the distribution of the Ainu people in Hokkaido

The Ainu Revolution Theory (Japanese: アイヌ革命論, Hepburn: Ainu kakumeiron) was a left-wing political concept in Japan that was prominent in the 1970s. It was a variant of the Proletarian Revolution Theory focusing on the Ainu people that came to light shortly after the revision of the Treaty of Mutual Cooperation and Security Between the United States and Japan. The actions and writings of Japanese left-wing thinker Ryu Ota in particular made Ainu Revolution Theory well known.

== History ==
In the early 1970s, a certain tendency of Zenkyoto groups and the Zengakuren began to emerge among other New Left activists in reaction to the stalemate of the All-Campus Joint Struggle League Movement (Zenkyoto). They believed that the lumpenproletariat could be the main body of the revolution, and that the Ainu people of Japan were also included inside this group. They believed that the Ainu people lived in a primitive communist system and were deemed worthy of being the "leaders of the Communist revolution".

In the mid-1970s, a number of violent incidents that appeared to have been influenced by the Ainu Revolution Theory occurred in various parts of the country (mainly in Hokkaido), such as the Shakushain Statue Incident, the Bombing of the Fusetsu no Gunzo and Institute of Northern Cultures, the Attack on the Mayor of Shiraoi, the Hokkaido Shrine Arson Incident, the Bombing of Hokkaido Police Headquarters, the Hokkaido government bombings, and the Bombing of Higashi Honganji. However, many of these incidents were carried out by the wider Japanese New Left.

The Ainu people's own ethnic movements, such as the Removal of the Old Earth Protection Law of Hokkaido movement, became active in the 1970s, but the development of Ainu Revolution Theory was not related to these movements. Ota Ryu was criticized for appropriating these movements. The Ainu Revolution discourse within leftist circles in Japan criticized Ota, saying that "by making the Ainu into the stock of the revolutionary movement, you are bothering them."

Ainu political activists Shoji Yuki and Kazuaki Yamamoto, along with others, formed the Ainu Liberation Alliance in 1972, challenging Japanese policy on the Ainu and public perception of the Ainu people. The Sapporo Olympics held in 1972 helped inspire militants to become more active in Hokkaido. Yuki became acquainted with Ota around 1972, accompanying him when he read out a public questionnaire at the Japanese Anthropological and Ethnic Association Congress at Sapporo Medical University. Yuki later criticized that Ota's Ainu Revolution Theory was inconsistent with Ainu beliefs and circumstances. After both were arrested in 1974 for inciting riots (Nolle prosequi), Ota and Yuki mutually criticized each other, with Ota being insulted and isolated.

Eventually, Ota's decline, conversion to becoming an ecologist, and subscription to conspiracy theories led to a rapid decline in the popularity of Ainu Revolution Theory.

== See also ==
- Anti-Japaneseism
