= Hara Hara Tokei =

1974 guerrilla manual

Hara Hara Tokei (腹腹時計) is a manual released in March 1974 describing tactics for guerrillas and methods of bomb-making which was an underground publication of the "wolf cell" of the East Asia Anti-Japan Armed Front, a far-left terrorist organization responsible for serial bombings of Japanese corporations in the 1970s including the offices of Mitsubishi Heavy Industries in 1974.

== History ==
The East Asia Anti-Japan Armed Front was planning the publication of a book to make their ideas widely known in Japanese society. In the autumn of 1973 they bought a Japanese typewriter and made use of it heavily in implementing this plan. The leader of their "wolf cell" Masashi Daidoji wrote the text and collaborators who were not members typed it with the typewriter. It was printed at a printing company in Kushiro, Hokkaido where Daidoji's high school senpai was working.

At first members of the EAAJAF were about to settle on the title of "Guidebook for the Urban Guerrilla Soldier Volume 1", but some suggested that a different name that left more to the imagination would be better, just like How to Raise Flower Bulbs, the publication used by the old Mountain Village Operation Unit. Because of this "A Soldier's Handbook Volume 1" was relegated to the subtitle and they decided to go with a different motif. Because there was a description of timing devices in the book, they went with a name related to clocks, or tokei in Japanese. In the end, they decided on "Hara Hara Tokei". "Hara Hara" carries a double meaning of heart-pounding suspense (hara hara) from an explosive device, and the hara command form used in the Korean language for written instructions.

The suggested retail price of the manual was said to be 100 yen, and on the back cover of the original print edition they put as an inset image the cover of a South Korean magazine which was banned by the regime of Park Chung-hee because the printing company published the anti-war poems of Kim Chi-ha. Thanks to this book, the EAAJAP's "wolf cell", led by Daidoji, attained members for the "scorpion cell" and "fangs of the Earth cell".

Because restrictions on publishing itself were impossible due to constitutional guarantees on freedom of speech, the investigating authorities issued arrests for instigating and abetting the creation of explosive devices under Section 4 of the Explosives Control Act. It became clear to the police that the text and contents of their statements at the start of the book were tantamount to written confessions of the crimes and thus, through use of them to deduce the identities of the members, the organization was annihilated.

== Contents of the book ==
Within Hara Hara Tokei is an overview of the anti-Japanese ideology in which the EAAJAP believed and also detailed explanations of methods of waging guerrilla war and of making and setting up bombs.

Concerning bomb-making, the manual explains with illustrations that "Anyone with a middle-school level knowledge of chemistry can do it". As ingredients, the manual recommends a mixed explosive making use of sodium chlorite-based herbicides which, if one goes to rural communities where weeds are a problem in summer, can be bought in great quantity without being noted as anything suspicious.

Furthermore, Hara Hara Tokei also includes guidelines for blending in with ordinary citizens and not arousing suspicion which were published as a way to circumvent "How to Spot an Extremist", which was Chapter 5 of an appeal for cooperation made around the year 1971 by the investigating authorities to the Japanese people to expose members of extremist groups like the Japanese Red Army. Media reports describe the following guidelines that members of the EAAJAP put into practice.

- Extreme obsession with secrecy at your home and not associating with others are, on the contrary, just digging your own grave. Exchange a minimal number of greetings and show that you have regular daily habits.
- There is no particular need to cut ties with family members.
- Don't at all flaunt your left-wing political views.
- Don't associate with the "legal left". Because they are fickle and can't keep secrets they cannot be trusted.

Incidentally, the investigative authorities thought that Hara Hara Tokei's sole flaw was that it didn't give lessons on destruction of evidence. The Public Security Bureau were keeping their suspects under surveillance and they said that what led to the mass arrest of the entire group was the discovery of envelopes with rough drafts of their claims to responsibility in the trash outside their hideout immediately after the simultaneous bombing of Oriental Metal and the Korean Industry Economic Research Institute on 19 April 1975.

== Influence of the book ==
There were also many among other factions of the Japanese New Left who were critical of the anti-Japanese ideology of the EAAJAF itself, but even their militant members made the parts of Hara Hara Tokei dealing with techniques of bomb construction into their textbook. Hara Hara Tokei even transcended ideology and spread among the far-right and ultranationalist militants.

There was an incident in May 1985 where letter bombs were sent to the headquarters of the left-wing Japan Teachers' Union and its affiliate in Mie Prefecture and at the latter a female staff member's hair was burned. A copy of Hara Hara Tokei was confiscated from the arrested perpetrator who belonged to an ultranationalist group in Shimane Prefecture.

== References in popular culture ==
- In chapter two of Rumiko Takahashi's Dust Spurt, the title of "Physics, Hara Hara Tokei, and Time Bombs Even You Can Make" appears in one of the blacklisted high school textbooks the protagonist is smuggling.
- In the bomb-making scene of the movie Battle Royale, based on a novel by Koushun Takami, Hara Hara Tokei is used as a textbook.
- In the TV drama AIBOU: Tokyo Detective Duo there was a poster reading "Hara Hara Tokei" at the home of the bomber.
- In chapter 18 of the manga Susume! Ikaryaku by Kouta Hirano a group of otaku who are plotting the "terrorist act" of forcing a unilateral meeting of Comiket in opposition to laws and regulations on manga, anime, and gaming, are helped by an old soldier and veteran of the 1960 Anpo protests against the US-Japan Security Treaty who remarks that Hara Hara Tokei, "is a dōjinshi we used to read".
- In volume 3, chapter 10, of the manga adaptation of the TV anime Puella Magi Madoka Magica, by manga artist Hanokage, there is a scene in which Homura Akemi, one of the protagonists, is making a bomb while looking at a website on the Internet titled "Hara Hara Tokei". When episode 10 of the TV anime was in the script stage, it as well, from the initial draft right up to the final manuscript, set the name of the website as "Hara Hara Tokei Online", but in the actual broadcast it was altered to "How To Make Bombs".

== See also ==
- East Asia Anti-Japan Armed Front
- Minimanual of the Urban Guerrilla

== Bibliography ==
- Ryuuichi Matsushita『狼煙を見よ 東アジア反日武装戦線"狼"部隊』(2017)

（読売新聞社・戦後ニッポンを読む、1997） ISBN 4-643-97116-9
（河出書房新社・松下竜一その仕事22、2000） ISBN 4-309-62072-8
