= Toshinao =

- Pronunciation: toɕinao (Kunrei-shiki)
- Gender: Male

Origin
- Origin: Japanese
- Meaning: Different meanings depending on the kanji used

Other names
- Alternative spelling: Tosinao (Kunrei-shiki) Tosinao (Nihon-shiki) Toshinao (Hepburn)

Toshinao is a masculine Japanese given name.

== Written forms ==
Toshinao can be written using different combinations of kanji characters. Some examples:

- 敏直, "agile, frankness"
- 敏尚, "agile, still"
- 敏猶, "agile, furthermore"
- 俊直, "talented, frankness"
- 俊尚, "talented, still"
- 俊猶, "talented, furthermore"
- 利直, "benefit, frankness"
- 利尚, "benefit, still"
- 利猶, "benefit, furthermore"
- 年直, "year, frankness"
- 年尚, "year, still"
- 寿直, "long life, frankness"
- 寿尚, "long life, still"

The name can also be written in hiragana としなお or katakana トシナオ.

== Notable people with the name ==
- Toshinao Nakagawa (中川 俊直, born 1970), Japanese politician.
- Toshinao Nanbu (南部 利直, 1576–1632), Japanese samurai and daimyō.
- Toshinao Sasaki (佐々木 俊尚, born 1961), Japanese journalist.
- Toshinao Tomie (富江 利直, born 1910), Japanese middle-distance runner.
- Toshinao Urabe (卜部 敏直, born 1950), Japanese diplomat.
