= 1974 Mitsubishi Heavy Industries bombing =

Far-left terrorist attack in Tokyo, Japan

1974 Mitsubishi Heavy Industries bombing 三菱重工爆破事件
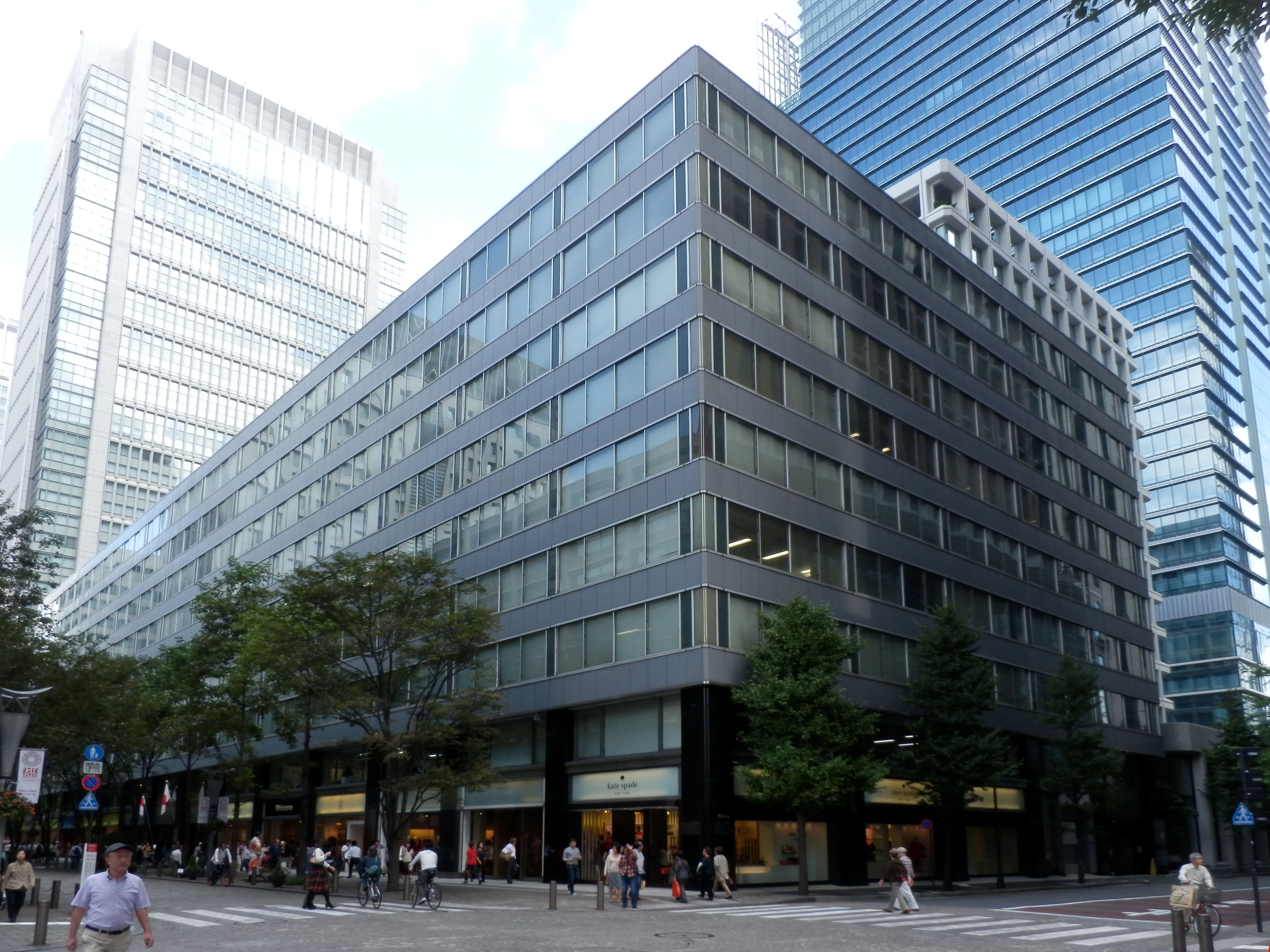
- The building where the bombing took place, pictured 2012
- Location: 35°40′47″N 139°45′46″E; Marunouchi, Chiyoda, Tokyo, Japan
- Date: 30 August 1974; 12:45 pm (UTC+9)
- Weapon: Time bomb
- Deaths: 8
- Injuries: 376+
- Perpetrator: East Asia Anti-Japan Armed Front

On 30 August 1974, the Mitsubishi Heavy Industries headquarters in Tokyo, Japan, was bombed, killing eight people and injuring at least 376 others. The bombing was committed by the East Asia Anti-Japan Armed Front, a far-left, anti-Japanese militant organization, against Mitsubishi Heavy Industries for supplying the United States Armed Forces during the Vietnam War.

It was the deadliest terrorist attack in Japan until the Tokyo subway sarin attack in 1995.

== Background ==
The East Asia Anti-Japan Armed Front (Higashi Ajia Hannichi Busō Sensen; EAAJAF) was a Japanese far-left organization, influenced by the New Left movement. Founded in 1972, it espoused a communist anti-Japaneseism ideology, with anarchist leanings. The EAAJAF viewed the Empire of Japan as the "perfect evil" and condemned the Pacific War as an "aggressive war" committed by Japan. In 1971, the EAAJAF's predecessor organization had launched a campaign of non-fatal bombings against the Japanese state, especially targeting symbols associated with Japanese imperialism, but in 1974 escalated its campaign to include the use of violence.

On 14 August 1974, the EAAJAF tried to blow up the bridge over which Emperor Hirohito's royal train was travelling, which they code-named the "Rainbow Operation", but this was aborted because a member was spotted shortly before it was to be put into action. The following day Mun Se-gwang, a Korean-Japanese member of Chongryon and a far-left militant organization tied to the EAAJAF, attempted to assassinate President Park Chung-hee of South Korea. Despite Mun's failure to kill Park, the attack soured the already fragile Japan–South Korea relations and encouraged the EAAJAF's Wolf cell to commit new terrorist bombings in sympathy with Mun. The EAAJAF targeted Mitsubishi Heavy Industries, a large Japanese corporation which manufactured weapons for use by the United States against North Vietnam in the Vietnam War in the early 1970s.

== Bombing ==
Members of the 'Wolf' (狼 Ōkami) cell of EAAJAF planted two home-made time bombs containing 45 kilograms of explosives in a flower pot at the entrance of Mitsubishi Heavy Industries' head office block in the busy Marunouchi district of Tokyo. The EAAJAF gave a telephone warning to the people inside the building eight minutes before the explosion, but it was dismissed as a hoax. Another warning was made four minutes later after the first warning was ignored, but the building was not evacuated. One of the bombs exploded at 12:45 p.m. (UTC+9), lunchtime; the other failed to explode.

Five people, two of them Mitsubishi employees, were killed immediately, and three more died in hospital shortly afterwards. An estimated 376 people were injured in the blast, with about 330 people taken to hospital, of whom 116 were Mitsubishi employees. The explosion shattered the glass of the office block up to the eleventh storey, and that of buildings opposite including the headquarters of Mitsubishi Electric. It was loud enough to be heard from Shinjuku, over 5 kilometres (3.1 mi) away. Vehicles and some trees in the streets were also destroyed.

== Aftermath ==
The bombing, which caused many more casualties than the EAAJAF expected due to the lack of evacuation, caused an outrage among the media. One editor said "This incident is a most atrocious challenge to our society. Society itself was the target and the victim." The Japan Times called for a "show of public wrath" against the terrorists. However, rightist Prime Minister Kakuei Tanaka and leaders of leftist parties remained silent about the incident. Nervousness among the Tokyo population increased following two other bombings carried out by the group in the city in 1974, with the police still not having made arrests.

Seven members of EAAJAF were arrested on 19 May 1975. In 1987, Masashi Daidoji and Toshiaki Masunaga were convicted and sentenced to death. Daidoji, leader of the former group's Wolf cell, said during court hearings that the bombing was "a mistake". In May 1999 while on death row, he apologized to the victims for the first time, saying "Our causing casualties is not something I can justify. I would like to apologize from the bottom of my heart." Daidoji died of multiple myeloma on 24 May 2017 at the Tokyo Detention Center. Masunaga died of yet unknown causes on 22 November 2026 at the Tokyo Detention Center.

EAAJAF member and bombing participant Satoshi Kirishima, who had been hiding from the Japanese police since 1975, revealed his identity in January 2024 in a hospital in Kanagawa, stating he wanted to die by his real name. It was revealed he had been living under the pseudonym of "Hiroshi Uchida" in Fujisawa. He died three days later in Kamakura.

The 1974 Mitsubishi Heavy Industries bombing was the deadliest terrorist attack as defined by modern standards that had occurred in Japan at the time, and remained the deadliest for over two decades until the Tokyo subway sarin attack on 20 March 1995 which killed 12 people.

== See also ==
- Bombing of the Fusetsu no Gunzo and Institute of Northern Cultures
- Bombing of the Soji-ji Ossuary
