= Attempted assassination of Asari Giichi =

1974 stabbing of Asari Giichi

On 8 March 1974, a 22-year-old ethnically Japanese man from Hiroshima named Yagi Tatsumi entered the office of Asari Giichi (浅利義市), the also-Japanese mayor of Shiraoi, Hokkaido, and stabbed him in the neck. The attempted assassination was performed, according to the statement Tatsumi read before the stabbing, to protest the exploitation and commodification of the Ainu people of Hokkaido. The incident was a part of a string of anti-Japanese violent actions performed by pro-Ainu groups such as the East Asia Anti-Japan Armed Front.

== Background ==
The rise of 1960s counterculture around the world kicked off an increasing movement for Ainu rights within both Ainu and non-Ainu communities. The Ainu rights movement mostly involved organized protest and the defacement of monuments. However, the movement also involved multiple instances of serious violence, such as the Bombing of the Fusetsu no Gunzo and Institute of Northern Cultures in 1972. Although most of these incidents, while connected to the Ainu, were not perpetrated by Ainu, they brought increasing tension and attention to the "Ainu problem".

The town of Shiraoi, Hokkaido had been a popular destination for cultural tourism throughout the 20th century. Multiple locals had complained about the commodification of Ainu for tourism purposes – one described it as "heartbreaking to see these 'tourist Ainu' who had been robbed of their own subjectivity". Tatsumi, the perpetrator of the stabbing, claimed that these "tourist Ainu" were being exploited – they made and sold cultural artifacts, but were paid low wages, the money made instead going to ethnic Japanese.

== Aftermath ==
The attempted assassination failed, and Giichi survived. However, acts of violence continued, with a similarly-intentioned arson attack in September 1974 in Shiraoi. In more reformist politics, the Hokkaido Utari Association was formed in the mid-1970s to address the problem of the commodification of Ainu culture that Giichi was attacked for. The Ainu were turned against the continuing violence by ethnic Japanese, leading to a paradigm shift among Ainu towards Ainu tourist centers. The string of violence kicked off Ainu studies of Ainu culture and the transformation of Ainu tourist centers into places where Ainu culture and identity is protected and a forum is created for Ainu from around Hokkaido.
