= Deathbed confession =

Confession made by someone nearing death

A deathbed confession is confession made by a person when they are nearing death.

Such confessions may help alleviate any guilt or regrets the dying person has, by allowing them to spend their last moments free from any secrets or sins they have been hiding for a long part of their life. If religious, the confessor may believe that confessing will earn them forgiveness from a higher power, granting them entrance to a better place after death. Further rationale may be that a person nearing death will not be able to face any significant punishments for the confession, such as shame or imprisonment. Deathbed confessions can be given to anyone, with family members and medical staff particularly likely to hear them, as they are often present in a person's last moments. In some cases, a deathbed confession may be legally admissible in a court of law despite rules on hearsay. Like other types of confessions, some deathbed confessions are false confessions.

== Types ==
Deathbed confessions can range from a confession of sins that have been committed to crimes that have been committed or witnessed. Often, these confessions are made to clear the dying's conscience, which may implicate or clear themselves or another. A common type of confession is either religious or spiritually based. On the deathbed, the dying will confess sins or mistakes they have made in their lifetime, and ask for forgiveness, so that they may move on to the afterlife according to their religion. Different religions have different protocols for the deathbed confession, but religions commonly seek to provide relief for the dying. People may also confess their feelings for another person while dying. This can relieve the dying of the internal struggle with hiding how they actually feel for someone. These emotions can range from hatred to love.

Many confessions have involved the admittance of a crime that the dying has committed, which obviously cannot be prosecuted once the perpetrator has died. On the other hand, someone can confess that they have knowledge of or witnessed a crime that has been committed. This kind of confession, known as a "dying declaration", can sometimes be admissible in court to get a conviction, depending on the circumstances of the statement. Another use for a deathbed confession in the criminal justice system is to re-open a case that may have gone cold to get closure for the victim's family or friends, even if prosecution is not an option.

Deathbed confessions can also include other types of confessions; for example, the acceptance or denial of religious beliefs, financial crimes, or matters of paternity. Deathbed confessions can also be trivial and need not have legal ramifications. Historically, it has been common for religious proponents to allege that non-believers or deists have converted to an orthodox religion upon death. While some deathbed conversions are a matter of public record, there are numerous examples of famous public figures—including Charles Darwin, George Washington, and Voltaire—allegedly converting upon their deathbed. In these particular cases, such allegations have variously been contested or outright disproven.

== Religion ==
=== Christianity ===
==== Catholicism ====
Catholic Christians believe that sins must be confessed to a priest before death. The priest, acting In persona Christi, can then absolve the dying of their sins, so that they can be properly prepared for the afterlife. The admittance of sin is important to the dying individual, because this frees them from sin, purifying the soul for a happy afterlife with God in Heaven. These final confessions, sometimes along with the Last Rites, are often performed by a hospital priest or chaplain when a patient's quality of life suddenly declines.

Although confessing near death is encouraged, postponing one's repentance until the end of the life is not. According to Franz Hunolt, this is because: "Firstly: the grace of true repentance and a happy death is far too great for the sinner to expect it in his last moments. Secondly: the sick man is then far too weak to correspond with divine grace, so as to repent sincerely. " In another of his sermons he states, "The sinner who puts off repentance until the hour of death can have no hope of being then converted; because that hope is denied him: 1. by God Himself, 2. by experience." Such a view is also put forward by St. Alphonsus Liguori who writes, "Miserable the sick man who takes to his bed in the state of mortal sin! He that lives in sin till death shall die in sin. "You shall die in your sin." (John viii. 21.) It is true that, in whatsoever hour the sinner is converted, God promises to pardon him; but to no sinner has God promised the grace of conversion at the hour of death. "Seek the Lord while he may be found." (Isa. iv. 6.) Then, there is for some sinners a time when they shall seek God and shall not find him. "You shall seek me, and shall not find me." (John vii. 34.)"

==== Lutheranism ====
The Lutheran Church teaches that a sincere deathbed confession can result in the salvation of the penitent.

=== Hinduism ===
Hinduism is largely centered around the idea of karma and reincarnation. Good karma allows the soul to move up on the incarnation hierarchy to a better life. Bad karma does the opposite; it causes the soul to have to pay for its actions in this life or the previous one. The next incarnation is less fortunate until the bad karma is cancelled out by good deeds or suffering. This heavy emphasis on karma leads many Hindus to carry out many final acts to improve their chances in the next life and reduce end of life suffering. The main ways Hindus try to increase their karma before moving onto the next life is by apologizing to people, resolving any issues with family or friends, confessions with a guru or other religious figure, religious ceremonies, sacrifices or repentance. Performing all, or some, of these actions allows the patient to think about God, while they pass and prepare for the next life.

=== Judaism ===
The Talmud teaches that "if one falls sick and his life is in danger, he is told: 'Make confession, for all who are sentenced to death make confession.'" Masechet Semachot adds,

"When someone is approaching death, we tell him to confess before he dies, adding that on the one hand, many people confessed and did not die, whilst on the other, there are many who did not confess and died, and there are many who walk in the street and confess; because on the merit of confession you will live."

== Law ==
=== England and Wales ===
Deathbed confessions are known as 'dying declarations' and constitute an exception to hearsay. Such declarations are only valid if made by a victim of an unlawful killing who is aware of their impending death. The declaration must also be complete (so it cannot be interrupted by the victim falling unconscious, for example) and relate to the circumstances of the victim's death. If admitted in a jury trial, the jurors must be warned that the declaration was not subject to cross-examination.

=== United States ===
A deathbed confession can be admissible evidence in court under certain circumstances. If someone confesses knowledge of a crime and then dies or their condition worsens, the law does not consider the statement to be hearsay and it can be used in a criminal trial.

=== Examples ===
An example of a deathbed confession accepted by the court:

- James Washington—In 2012, James Washington admitted to the murder of Joyce Goodener, a 35-year-old Nashville, Tennessee, woman who was found dead by firefighters inside an abandoned home 17 years prior. He ended up recovering and was convicted of murder despite trying to recant his confession.

Examples of deathbed confessions of crimes taken seriously by law-enforcement include:

- Emma Alice Smith—Many decades after the 1926 disappearance of a 16-year-old girl named Emma Alice Smith in Sussex, England, a man named David Wright claimed in 2009 that his deceased great-aunt Lillian Smith, a sister of Emma Alice Smith, had told her niece that in the 1950s she had taken a deathbed confession from a man claiming that he had murdered Emma Alice on her way to the train station in Horam. The case was reopened, not to find a killer but to find the body of the young girl to give her a proper burial and give her relatives some closure. In 2011, Sussex Police concluded that despite the alleged deathbed confession, Emma Alice Smith had not been murdered but had in fact eloped with a married man named Thomas Wills. Police concluded the pair had probably ended up in the Republic of Ireland.
- Margaret Gibson—On October 21, 1964, 70-year-old American retired actress Margaret Gibson suffered a heart attack, and then confessed to the February 1, 1922, murder of film director William Desmond Taylor. Gibson was never mentioned during the investigation, and no surviving documentation refers to any association between Taylor and her after 1914. All of the police files and physical evidence relating to Taylor's murder disappeared by 1940, and, aside from circumstantial evidence, no confirmation of Gibson's involvement in it has since emerged. However, Gibson's reported confession does not conflict with the known historical record.
- Satoshi Kirishima—In January 2024, a Japanese man died of terminal cancer at a hospital in Kamakura, Kanagawa Prefecture. A few days prior to his death, the man claimed to the nurses to be Satoshi Kirishima, a wanted terrorist associated with the East Asia Anti-Japan Armed Front who had evaded capture for 49 years. At the time of the man's death, Kirishima was one of the most wanted men in Japan with his wanted poster found ubiquitously throughout the country. It was confirmed that he was Kirishima through DNA tests on 2 February.

== See also ==
- List of last words
- Suicide note
