= Satoshi Kirishima =

Japanese terrorist (1954–2024)

- 桐島 聡
- Born: January 9, 1954; Kannabe, Japan
- Died: January 29, 2024 (aged 70); Kamakura, Japan
- Other name: Hiroshi Uchida
- Occupation: Construction worker (incognito)

Satoshi Kirishima (Japanese: 桐島聡, romanized: Kirishima Satoshi, January 9, 1954 – January 29, 2024) was a Japanese anarchist, terrorist, and member of the East Asia Anti-Japan Armed Front.

Kirishima had been hiding from the Japanese police since 1975. He revealed his identity in January 2024 in a hospital in Kanagawa, stating he wanted to spend the final days of his life using his real name. It was revealed he had been living under the pseudonym of 'Hiroshi Uchida' (Japanese: 内田洋, romanized: Uchida Hiroshi) in Fujisawa. He died three days later in Kamakura.

Kirishima was considered one of Japan's most wanted criminals for a long time. His mugshot, which could be found at police stations across Japan, was well known for his grin and was often parodied.

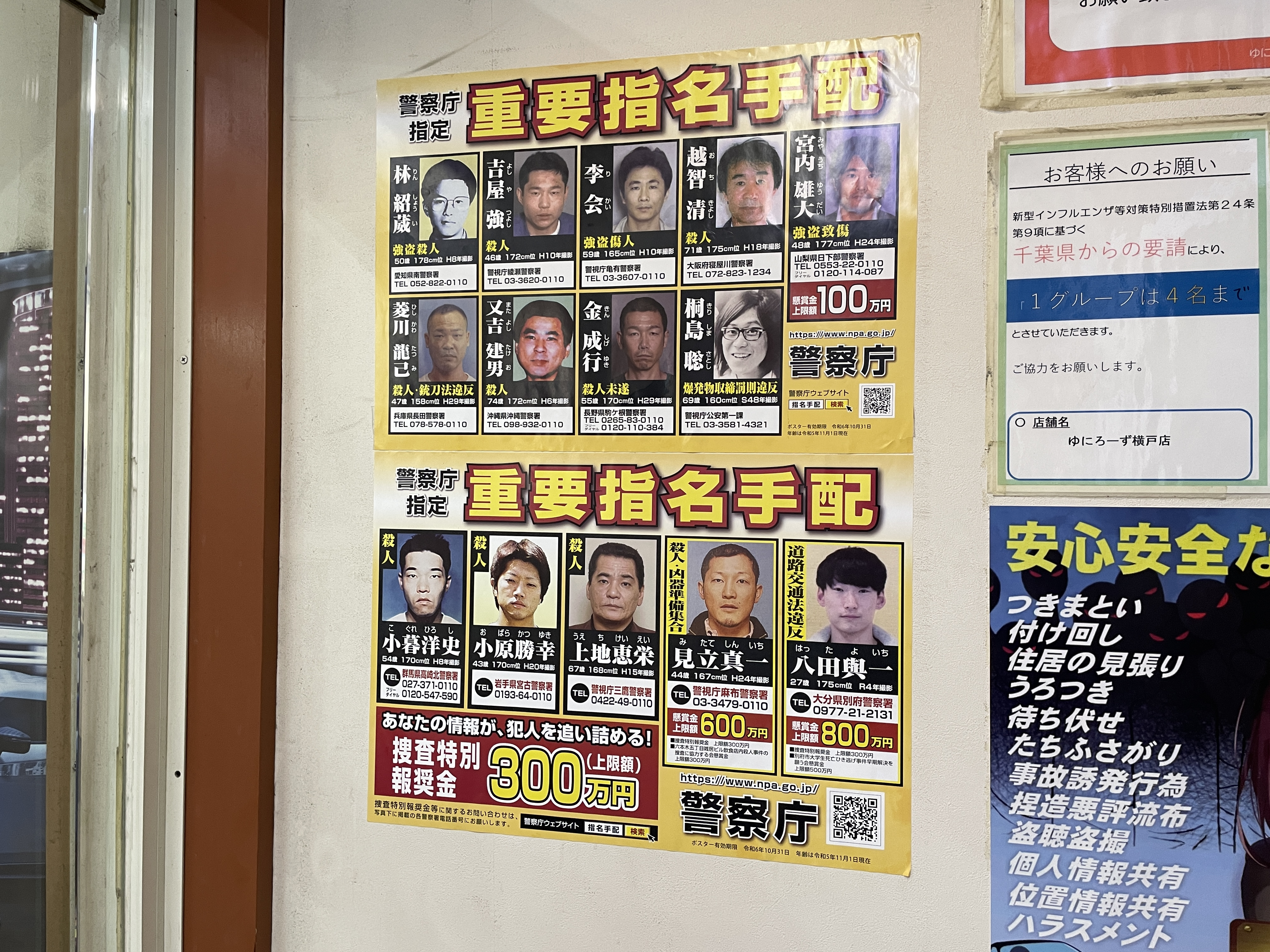
Satoshi's mugshot is at the bottom right of the top poster.

== Early life ==
Kirishima was born in Kannabe-cho, Fukuyasu District (today part of Fukuyama city), Hiroshima Prefecture, on January 9, 1954. In April 1974 he began studies at the Faculty of Law of Meiji Gakuin University in Tokyo, where he met Yoshimasa Kurokawa, and Hisauchi Ugajin, members of the Scorpion (さそり, sasori) cell of the East Asia Anti-Japan Armed Front (EAAJAF). As a member of the Scorpion Cell, he participated in a series of bombings against Japanese corporations.

== Fugitive life ==
In April 1975, Kirishima was put on a nationwide wanted list and went on the run after he allegedly helped set up a bomb that blew up part of Economic Research Institute of Korea building in Tokyo's Ginza district. No one was killed in the bombing. On May 19, 1975, Masashi Daidōji of the Wolf Cell, Kurokawa, and five other key members of the EAAJAF were arrested. Kirishima's house key was in the possession of Kurokawa, which brought Kirishima to the attention of the police. The Public Security Bureau charged Kirishima with violation of the Criminal Regulations to Control Explosives Law, and issued wanted posters of Kirishima throughout Japan. Altogether, Kirishima was suspected to be involved in seven bombing cases, including four against Hazama Corporation. Upon his arrest, he denied responsibility for the Ginza bombing but admitted his involvement with at least one Hazama bombing.

On May 20 Kirishima withdrew cash at a bank in Shibuya. On May 31, Kirishima telephoned his family in Hiroshima, revealing to his father that, "I'm in Okayama with two women ... prepare some money ... thinking about escaping overseas ...". This was the last time Kirishima contacted friends, family, or acquaintances.

When Kirishima revealed his identity before his death, it was discovered that he had gone into hiding, that he had been living under the pseudonym "Hiroshi Uchida" for decades, that he had been working as a live-in worker at a construction company in Fujisawa City, Kanagawa Prefecture, and was living alone in an old wooden two-story dormitory near his workplace. Kirishima was paid in cash and did not possess a mobile phone to avoid detection. He also did not own a driver's license or health insurance. His nickname was 'Uchii', and was known to be a big music fan, with James Brown being among his favorites. Once a month he would turn up at a music event at a bar in Fujisawa, where he would dance. Neighbors were unaware of his true identity, with one describing him as a "calm and serious" man, who would occasionally play guitar in his room.

== Discovery and death ==
On January 25, 2024, Japanese police said it had taken into its custody a man who it said claimed to be Kirishima from a hospital in Kanagawa Prefecture. At the time of his arrest, Kirishima was one of the most wanted men in Japan, having evaded capture for 49 years with his wanted poster found ubiquitously throughout the country. The man who claimed to be Kirishima had checked himself under his pseudonym into the hospital for terminal cancer and while undergoing treatment, told hospital staff that he was the fugitive Satoshi Kirishima and that he made this confession as he felt he would die soon and wanted to live what was left of his life under his real name.

After the man made that statement, the police were called and he was arrested, with a DNA test taken on the man to try and confirm if he really was Kirishima or if the confession was false. The self-proclaimed Kirishima was taken in custody by the Tokyo Metropolitan Police. He told investigators some details about the attack. On January 29, 2024, the man who claimed to be Kirishima died of the cancer that had led him to seek hospital treatment. The results of the confirmatory DNA test were not yet finished at the time of his death but later indicated that the deceased was likely Kirishima, which was confirmed following comparative tests with Kirishima's relatives.

== Legacy ==
Satoshi's mugshot featured across police stations in Japan is widely viewed as iconic and famous.

A few days after he died, Shigeyuki Kin, a fugitive who was wanted for a shooting a man in an attempted murder case in 2020, was caught and arrested. It is thought that he was caught as a result of the recent attention surrounding Satoshi, as Shigeyuki's mugshot was placed to the left of Satoshi’s on the wanted posters.

On Boxing Day 2024, the trailer for The Escape (Tōsō), directed by Masao Adachi was uploaded to YouTube. The film, which dramatised Satoshi Kirishima's life, was released in July 2025, and stars Furutachi Kanji and Rairu Sugita.

On May 12, 2025, another film about Kirishima was released in theatres, titled I am Kirishima (Kirishima Desu), directed by Banmei Takahashi, starring Katsuya Maiguma.
