= Ryu Ota =

Japanese political activist (1930–2009)

Ryu Ota (Japanese: 太田 龍 / 太田 竜, Hepburn: Ōta Ryū; also Ryu Ohta; 16 August 1930 – 19 May 2009) was a Japanese political activist and writer. Initially a supporter of the Japanese New Left, he later turned to green politics before becoming an antisemitic conspiracy theorist.

== Biography ==
He was born Tōichi Kurihara (栗原 登一) in Toyohara, Karafuto Prefecture. In October 1945, he joined the Democratic Youth League of Japan. In 1947, he joined the Japanese Communist Party. In 1953, he left the Japanese Communist Party. In 1955, he and Kanichi Kuroda established the Japan Revolutionary Communist League, thus becoming leader of the Fourth International in Japan. In 1957, he established the Japanese Trotskyist League (日本トロツキスト連盟, Nihon Trotskyist Renmei).

In 1970, he was sentenced to death by his former fellow members for leaving the Japanese Trotskyist League. He spearheaded Ainu Revolution Theory, grouping the Ainu within the lumpenproletariat. In 1971 he attempted to start an Ainu revolution but failed. He and the leader of the Ainu Liberation League, Shoji Yuki, were both arrested for inciting a riot and they continuously blamed each other.

In 1986, he established the Japanese Green Party, but it immediately split into two separate parties and both failed. In 1986, he authored a book called Japan Ecologist Proclamation, in which he proclaimed that "we must overthrow all human dictatorship! Free the cockroaches, free the rats, free the earthworms!" Since 1986, he was a candidate in three elections. In the 1990s he became known as one of the principal publishers of antisemitic materials and Jewish conspiracy theories in Japan including Rothschild and International Jewish conspiracy theories and those by Eustace Mullins and Michael Collins Piper, as well as other conspiracy theories such as Masonic, Illuminati, NWO, Vatican, Committee of 300, UFO, Princess Diana, David Icke and Reptilians, William Guy Carr, Pearl Harbor, JFK, 9/11 and other anti-American conspiracy theories. He was also a self-styled Buddhist philosopher.

== Affiliations ==
He was the leader of the following associations:

- The Natural Life Academy (天寿学会, Tenju Gakkai)
- The Civilization Critic Academy (文明批判学会, Bunmei Hihan Gakkai)
- The Institute for Historical Revisionism (歴史修正研究所, Rekishi Shūsei Kenkyūjo)
- The Institute for Universal Strategy (宇宙戦略研究所, Uchū Senryaku Kenkyūjo)
- The Earth Restoration League (地球維新連盟, Chukyū Ishin Renmei)

He was also the author of UFO Theory and Space Civilization: Prospects for 21st Century Science.
