= Bombing of the Soji-ji Ossuary =

Terrorist bombing in Yokohama, Japan

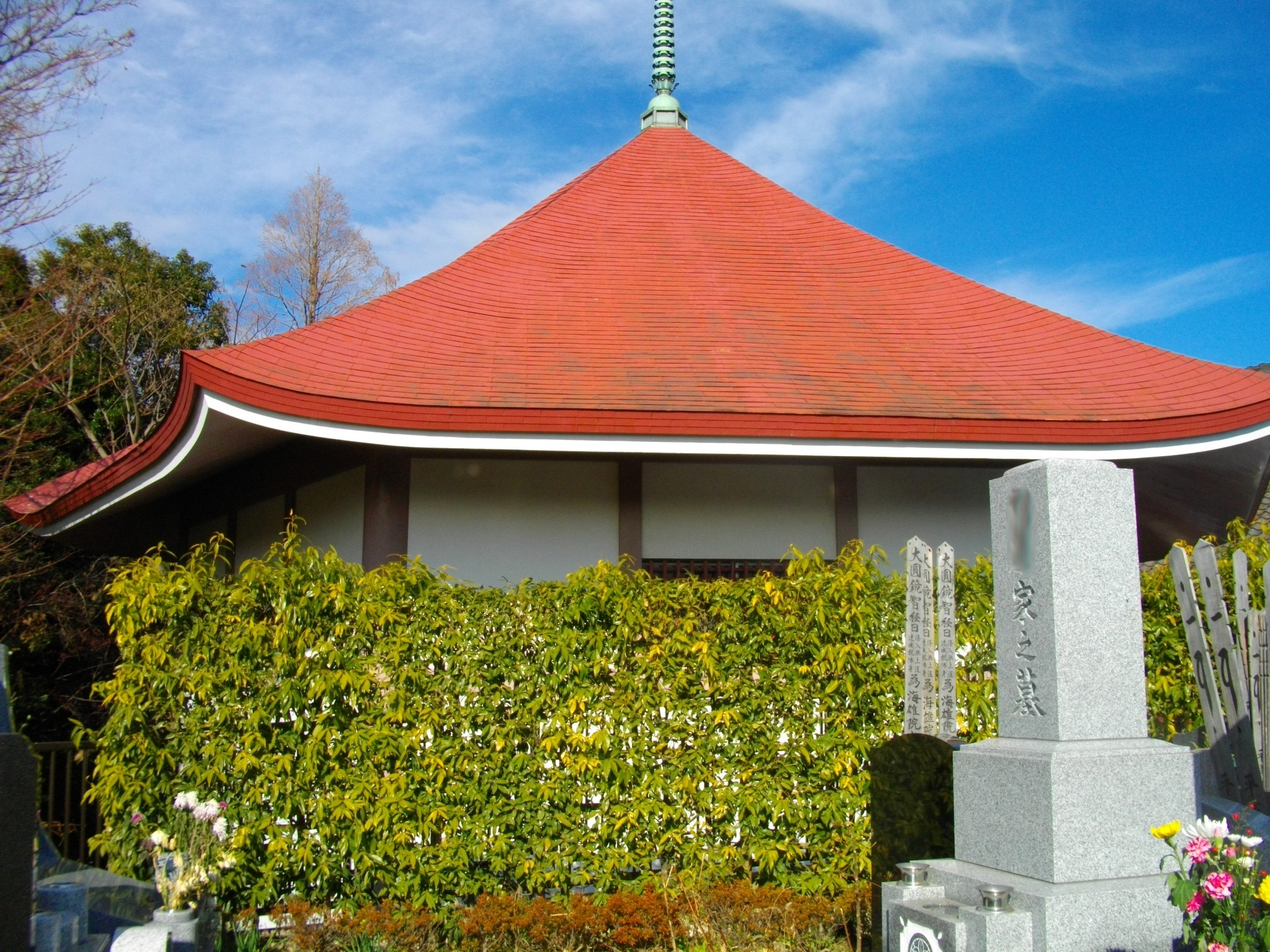
Soji-ji's ossuary

The Bombing of the Soji-ji Ossuary (総持寺納骨堂爆破事件, Sōjiji Nōkotsudō Bakuha Jiken) was a terrorist bomb attack in Yokohama, Japan that occurred on 6 April 1972. It was undertaken by a group which would later be known as the East Asia Anti-Japan Armed Front.

== Origin and history of the target ==
The remains that were laid in Joshoden, the ossuary of Soji-ji in Yokohama, are those of about 5,000 Japanese who lived in Korea under Japanese rule originally buried in the cemeteries of Keijo, the then capital of Korea which is now Seoul. After the end of colonialism these remains were left unattended so at the behest of Mayor Kim Hyonok an ossuary was built in 1970 at a civilian cemetery in Seoul. However, a series of anti-Japanese attacks damaged this ossuary, and finally on 15 August 1971, it was destroyed. The remains, which were out of necessity incinerated, were returned to Japan and it was decided that they would be entrusted to Soji-ji, the main temple of the Soto school.

== Attack ==
The East Asia Anti-Japan Armed Front decided to blow up the ossuary where "the bones of the invaders" laid in the name of "a resistance campaign for the Korean people". The date 1 March 1972 was chosen as the day to act due to its association with the March 1st Movement. However, because the staff at the temple saw the face of one of the members while doing advance inspection of the target, the plotters split into a group that sought to go ahead as planned and a group that wanted to play it safe and postpone the attack. The former group suffered its own internal split and disbanded.

The remaining faction moved forward with their preparations and on 6 April detonated a bomb disguised as a fire extinguisher on the headstone. Although it made a deafening noise and opened a large hole in the ground, it did not cause serious damage to the ossuary.

== Bibliography ==
- Futaranosuke Nagoshi, Ed.『日韓2000年の真実 写真400枚が語る両国民へのメッセージ』（国際企画、1997） ISBN 4-916029-12-7
- Ryuichi Matsushita『狼煙を見よ 東アジア反日武装戦線"狼"部隊』

（読売新聞社・戦後ニッポンを読む、1997） ISBN 4-643-97116-9
（河出書房新社・松下竜一その仕事22、2000） ISBN 4-309-62072-8

== See also ==
- East Asia Anti-Japan Armed Front
- Soji-ji
- Korea under Japanese rule
