= 2026 intrusion at the Embassy of China, Tokyo =

Chinese Embassy in Tokyo intrusion
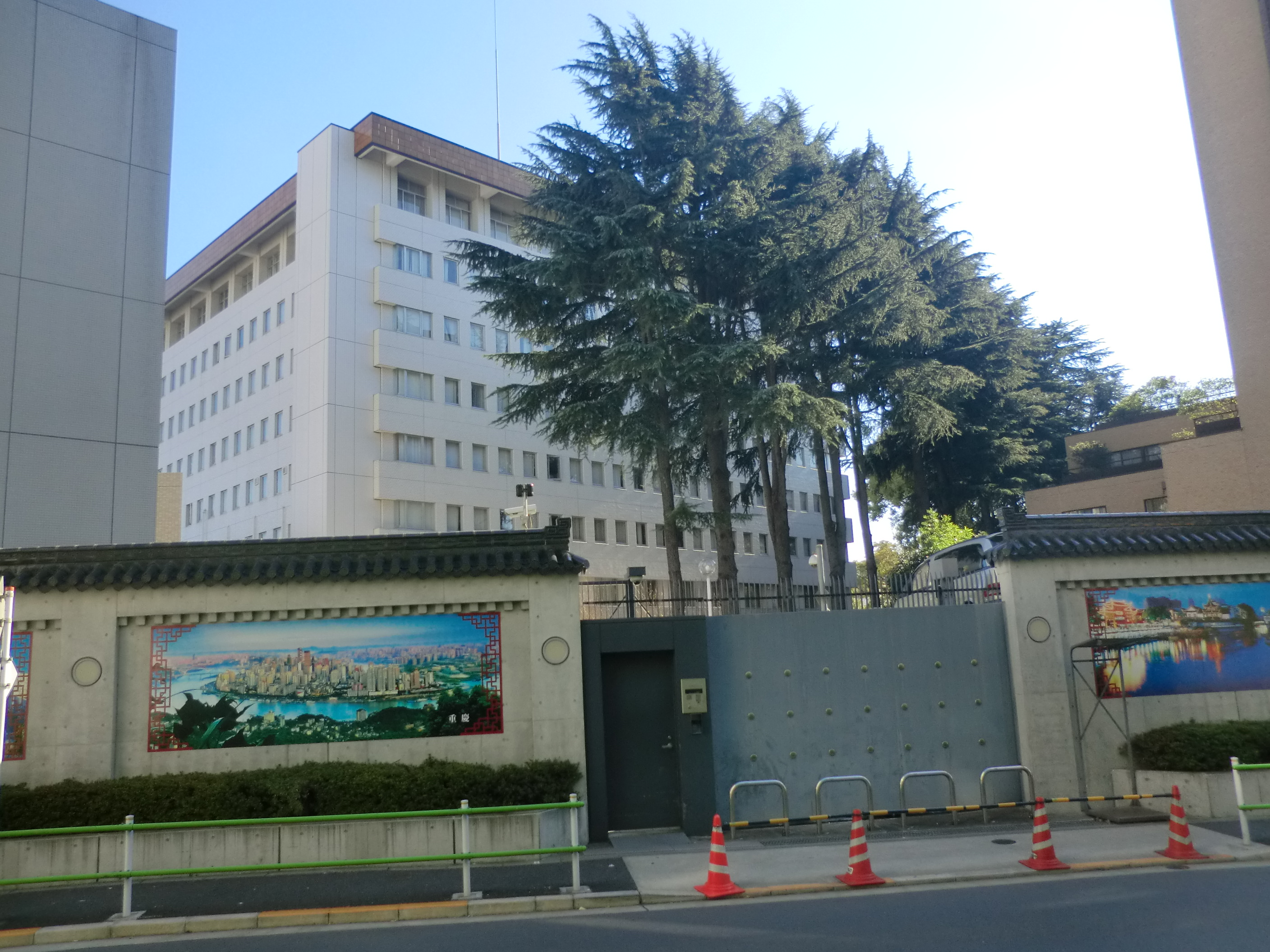
- Embassy of China, Tokyo
- Location: Tokyo, Japan
- Date: 24 March 2026; 8:55 a.m.
- Target: Embassy of China, Tokyo

On 24 March 2026, a member of the Japan Ground Self-Defense Force armed with a knife broke into the Embassy of China in Japan, located in Minato, Tokyo. Although no one was injured, the incident attracted attention from media outlets in both China and Japan.

== Intrusion ==
At around 8:00 a.m. on 24 March 2026, Kodai Murata (村田晃大), a second lieutenant of the Japan Ground Self-Defense Force, arrived at the Chinese Embassy in Japan, carrying his Self-Defense Force identification and a knife with an 18-centimeter blade in his backpack. He wandered around for an hour looking for a way to enter. At 8:55 a.m., Murata climbed over the wall through the fourth floor of a nearby building, but still got two or three cuts on his hands from barbed wire. Murata then hid in the green belt. When staff passed by, he called out to them and said he wanted to see the ambassador. At this time, he was not holding a knife. Embassy staff subdued him. Murata admitted that his actions were illegal and threatened to kill Chinese diplomats "in the name of God".

At 12:40 p.m., the Chinese Embassy in Japan contacted the Azabu Police Station of the Tokyo Metropolitan Police Department, and around the same time contacted the Japanese Ministry of Foreign Affairs. The police arrived at the embassy at around 1 p.m. and found the knife in the embassy's green belt. At around 4 p.m., the police took Kodai Murata to the Azabu Police Station. At the same time, Lin Jian, spokesperson for the Ministry of Foreign Affairs of China, disclosed the incident at the regular press conference of the Ministry of Foreign Affairs At 9:09 p.m., the police arrested Kodai Murata on suspicion of breaking into the building and informed reporters of the incident at 10 p.m.

== Suspect ==
The suspect is 23-year-old Kodai Murata, a second lieutenant in the Ground Self-Defense Force. He was born in Kurashiki, Okayama Prefecture in 2002. He graduated from Philosophy, Faculty of Letters, Sophia University in March 2025. He then entered the Ground Self-Defense Force Officer Candidate School for further studies and graduated in January 2026. In January, he was assigned to the Ebino Garrison in Ebino, Miyazaki Prefecture. He joined the Field Special Forces and was responsible for operations related to howitzer operations. He had not yet received specialized training. He was promoted to second lieutenant on 15 March and became an officer. the Ground Self-Defense Force Fuji School in April to receive a junior officer course.

The day before the incident, Kodai Murata was absent from work without cause. He took a highway bus from Ebino City to Hakata Station, and then took the Shinkansen to Tokyo. He bought knives around Tokyo Station and spent the night at a nearby internet cafe.

At the regular press conference of the Ministry of Foreign Affairs of China on 24 March, Lin Jian replied to a question from a reporter of the Global Times, saying that Murata Akio forcibly broke into the Chinese Embassy in Japan by climbing over the wall. When he was arrested, he admitted that his behavior was illegal and threatened to kill Chinese diplomats in the name of God, which seriously violated the Vienna Convention on Diplomatic Relations. The Metropolitan Police Department said that the suspect confessed that he heard God say in his dream that China's "tough talk" should be stopped. Therefore, he wanted to meet with the Chinese ambassador and hoped that the ambassador would restrain his tough talk. He also said that if the ambassador did not accept his opinion, he would commit suicide with a knife, which shocked the ambassador.

On 27 August, the Ground Self-Defense Force imposed a disciplinary sanction of dismissal on Kodai Murata. The Ground Self-Defense Force stated that "it is very regrettable that a Self-Defense Force officer has caused such a case." Murata reportedly said that he "deeply apologized for causing trouble to everyone in the workplace."

== Judicial proceedings ==
On 26 March, Kodai Murata was transferred from the Azabu Police Station to the Tokyo District Public Prosecutors Office. In the transport vehicle, Murata smiled at the reporters' cameras. On 29 March, the Tokyo Metropolitan Police Department Public Security Bureau investigated JGSDF Camp Ebino. On 14 April, the Metropolitan Police Department arrested Kodai Murata again on suspicion of violating the Firearm and Sword Possession Control Law by possessing a knife in the embassy compound.

On June 16, the Tokyo District Public Prosecutors Office announced that it had extended the detention period for the identification of Kodai Murata to 21 July. On 27 July, the Tokyo District Public Prosecutors Office formally indicted Kodai Murata on charges of trespassing, coercion, and violation of the Law on the Control of Possession of Firearms, Swords and Other Weapons. Kodai Murata's lawyer requested bail, but the Tokyo District Court refused: Judge Junichi Yoshiki stated that there were sufficient reasons to suspect that Murata might destroy evidence and abscond.

On 5 August, the Tokyo District Court held a hearing to reveal the reasons for the detention. Kodai Murata said that his motive was to urge the Ministry of Foreign Affairs of China to change its hardline diplomatic policy. He also said, "I am reflecting on my actions and feel regret."

On 10 November, an 18-month sentence was sought by prosecutors.

== Reactions ==
On 24 March, the Chinese Ministry of Foreign Affairs lodged a strong protest with Japan on the matter, criticizing the rampant spread of far-right ideology, security negligence, and mismanagement of the expansion of the Japan Self-Defense Forces. The Chinese Embassy also lodged a protest with the Japanese Ministry of Foreign Affairs. On the same day, the Ground Self-Defense Force acknowledged the incident and said it would cooperate with the Metropolitan Police Department's investigation. The Metropolitan Police Department expressed regret over the incident and said it would increase security personnel and take security measures.

On the morning of 25 March, Japanese Chief Cabinet Secretary Minoru Kihara stated that it was regrettable that a Self-Defense Force officer who should have abided by the law had been arrested, and that he would prevent similar incidents from happening again, and strengthen security measures at the Chinese Embassy. On 27 March, Japanese Defense Minister Shinjirō Koizumi also made a similar statement when meeting with reporters. The Chinese Ministry of Foreign Affairs stated that the Japanese side's expression of regret was far from sufficient, and that the Japanese side should thoroughly investigate the matter as soon as possible. On 26 March, the Ministry of Defense held a press conference to explain the incident and expressed regret over it. The Self-Defense Forces stated that they did not find any obvious problems with Murata Kota's work attitude. On the same day, the Chinese Ministry of Foreign Affairs and the Chinese Embassy in Japan once again reminded Chinese citizens to avoid traveling to Japan recently.

== Related events ==
On 16 April, Shi Yong, Chargé d'Affaires ad interim of the Chinese Embassy in Japan, held a press conference to introduce the situation of the embassy being threatened by terrorists in March. He first showed a threatening letter received on 5 March. It was handwritten in Japanese and the text was messy.

The letter claimed to be "a military elite force composed of former police officers and self-defense officers from special forces" and announced that "we will eliminate all Shina people in Japan without leaving any survivors." "This is a declaration of war against you Shina people." The embassy said that it immediately called the police after receiving the threatening letter, but the Japanese side did not take it seriously and has not yet found out the truth. On 31 March, another person claiming to be an emergency prepared self-defense officer said on social media that he had installed a remote-controlled bomb in the embassy. The embassy immediately called the police, and the Japanese police carried out a bomb disposal operation at the embassy for nearly two hours that day.

The embassy also displayed a photo of the 18-centimeter-long knife carried by Kodai Murata. The embassy has negotiated with the Japanese police nearly 30 times regarding the recent series of terrorist threats, but the investigation into the relevant cases has made no progress. China once again strongly urges Japan to expedite the investigation, severely punish those involved in accordance with the law, and give a responsible explanation to China.
