= Toshinao Sasaki =

Japanese journalist

Toshinao Sasaki (佐々木 俊尚, Sasaki Toshinao)
- Born: December 5, 1961 (age 64); Hyōgo Prefecture, Japan
- Education: Waseda University
- Occupation: Journalist

Toshinao Sasaki (佐々木 俊尚, Sasaki Toshinao; born December 5, 1961) is a Japanese freelance journalist and critic, a regular writer for CNET Japan, and a one-time reporter for Mainichi Shimbun. He was born in Hyōgo Prefecture.

== Background ==
After graduating from Okazaki high-school in Aichi Prefecture, Sasaki entered the Faculty of Political Science and Economics at Waseda University, but dropped out and in 1988 joined Mainichi Shimbun, where he was in charge of the criminal investigations division and reserve reporters, covering issues such as murder cases, international terror and computer crime.

In October 1999, he transferred to work for the magazine Ascii (アスキー, Asukii). He quit in February 2003 after serving in the editorial department of Gekkan Ascii (月刊アスキー, Gekkan Asukii), and is currently a freelance journalist.

== Activity ==
Sasaki has a great interest in Internet media that emerged at the beginning of the 21st century, and since he became a freelancer this has been at the center of his work. He has studied the so-called "Net Right-wing" in Japan a great deal, and has contributed many articles to publications such as Sankei Shimbun, Shokun (諸君, Shokun) and Ronza (論座, Ronza). He has also written many books, most recently The Birth of Blog Discourse (ブログ論壇の誕生, Burogu Rondan no Tanjō) (2008) and The Flat Revolution (フラット革命, Furatto Kakumei) (2007). He has also written extensively about the WaiWai scandal at the Mainichi Shimbun. He also covered Anti-Japaneseism which Sasaki called a "violent ideology" and self-contradictory.
