= Tokyo Metropolitan Police Department Public Security Bureau =

Bureau of the Tokyo Metropolitan Police Department

Public Security Bureau
- 警視庁公安部; Keishichō-kōanbu
- Active: 1945 - present
- Country: Japan
- Agency: Tokyo Metropolitan Police Department
- Headquarters: Tokyo
- Abbreviation: PSB

Structure
- Officers: 2,000

The Public Security Bureau (警視庁公安部, Keishichō-kōanbu) is a bureau of the Tokyo Metropolitan Police Department (TMPD) in charge of public security with jurisdiction over the Tokyo metropolis. It has a force of more than 2,000 officers. The bureau reports to the Deputy Superintendent General.

In the Japanese police organization, only the Metropolitan Police Department becomes "the bureau" where the security police branch becomes independent. In other prefectural police forces, the Public Security Section and Foreign Affairs Division are installed in a Security Department. Tokyo is seen as an exception since it had been working with the Japanese National Police Agency for the longest time since they share the same location.

The PSB is not the Japanese equivalent of the U.S. Federal Bureau of Investigation, despite some claims that it is. It does not concern with ordinary criminal activities. The main focus of the PSB are activities which threaten national security and therefore, their work is similar to Special Branches of British and Commonwealth police forces.

== History ==
The establishment of the PSB started on December 19, 1945 when the Security Division was established in the Tokyo Metropolitan Police. In February 1946, the SD was changed to the Public Security Division. In April 1952, the PSD's first and second security departments were established with the former taking charge of the TMPD's riot police units while the latter carried out security information operations. In April 1957, the TMPD's Security Department 1, Security Department 2, and Metropolitan Police Department Reserve were renamed as the Security Department, the Public Security Department and the Riot Police. After the September 11 attacks in the US, the PSB revamped its structure to include three intelligence sections in 2002.

The PSB had been mobilized to investigate all Aum Shinrikyo facilities after the deadly sarin gas attack on the Tokyo subway. Following the discovery of an Aum cultist who had been employed by the Japan Maritime Self-Defense Force after sensitive military information had been leaked out, the PSB had investigated the matter. The PSB had been the leading agency to investigate reports that Aum Shinrikyo had acquired names of 3,000 Honda executives and sensitive data from government ministries and other important facilities via Aum-created software.

The TMPD announced on November 2, 2020 that the foreign affairs division will be revamped to have two separate units to deal with intelligence matters concerning China and North Korea, giving it a total of four separate units. On March 19, 2021, the PSB completed reorganizing its units and their work would start by April 1, 2021 with 30 more officers assigned to the new units.

On December 25, 2022, the PSB produced a promotional video and starred Rena Nōnen aka Non on the dangers of foreign-backed corporate espionage.

In April 2025, the PSB reorganized to strengthen its response to lone wolf terrorism. A new Third Public Security Division, dedicated to countering lone wolf terrorism, was established. The intelligence-gathering functions related to lone wolves were transferred from the Public Security General Affairs Division, and those related to individuals purchasing raw materials for explosives were transferred from the Fourth Foreign Affairs Division. The former First and Second Public Security Divisions were merged to form the First Public Security Division. The former Third Public Security Division was renamed the Second Public Security Division.

In response to concerns raised in the Okawahara Kakoki Incident, the PSB created the Public Security Investigation and Guidance Office through the Public Security and General Affairs Division.

=== Cases ===
The PSB had failed in securing a Russian man wanted for spying in Japanese territory as a suspected agent of the SVR since the 1960s when he left Japan in 1995 and reentered the country several times before being unaccounted for when the spy used a Japanese name to obtain a Japanese passport in Vienna.

An ex-Japanese Air Self-Defense Forces warrant officer had been investigated by the PSB in 2002 for divulging military secrets under the Mutual Defense Assistance Agreement to a Russian GRU operative, who was identified as Aleksei Shchelkonogov. Three activists of the Tachikawa Jieitai Kanshi Tentomura had been said to be prisoners of conscience by Amnesty International when they had arrested by police with the PSB investigating them for conducting anti-war activities after illegally entering an SDF housing complex in Tachikawa in 2004.

PSB officers had been involved in the arrest of former Cabinet Intelligence and Research Office (CIRO) official Toshihiko Shimizu, accused of providing classified data to a Russian embassy official, supposedly posing as a diplomat in 2008. under the National Public Service Law.

On December 15, 2020, PSB officers investigated the activities of a South Korean man living in Tokyo accused of hacking into the Chongryon website and the Korea News Service.

On January 21, 2026, a Russian official posted at the Russian trade representative office was investigated for trying to obtain trade secrets under the unfair competition prevention law while posing as a Ukrainian national.

On March 29, 2026, the PSB began investigating a JGSDF officer with rank of Second Lt. after he allegedly broke into the Chinese Embassy in Tokyo.

=== Scandals ===
After a discovery of sophisticated radios by police during a raid on a JRCL Revolutionary Marxist Faction safehouse on April 10, 1998, PSB officials had reorganized their communications network to better safeguard it against unwanted intrusions.

In 2014, a report was made thanks to a leak that PSB officers were conducting covert surveillance activities on Muslims residents living in the Greater Tokyo Area.

In March 2020, the PSB arrested Masaaki Okawara, Junji Shimada and Shizuo Aishima of the Ohkawara Kakohki for exporting spray drying equipment due to concerns that it can be used for making biological weapons, violating the Foreign Exchange and Foreign Trade Act. Tokyo District Public Prosecutor's Office dropped the charges against them in July 2021. In July 2023, an anonymous PSB officer testified that the case against the company was faked; he mentioned that most of the investigators were motivated to have good job evaluations and have good retirement benefits after the case is "solved". In December 2023, the Tokyo District Court ruled the investigation to be illegal because an experiment conducted by the PSB if the exported equipment is able to disinfect. It was reported that information related to the case that are not in favor of prosecutors was not shared. The TMPD and the TDPPO apologized for their conduct in the case in June 2025. In December 2025, the TDPPO decided not to prosecute three PSB officers involved in the case.

== Organization ==
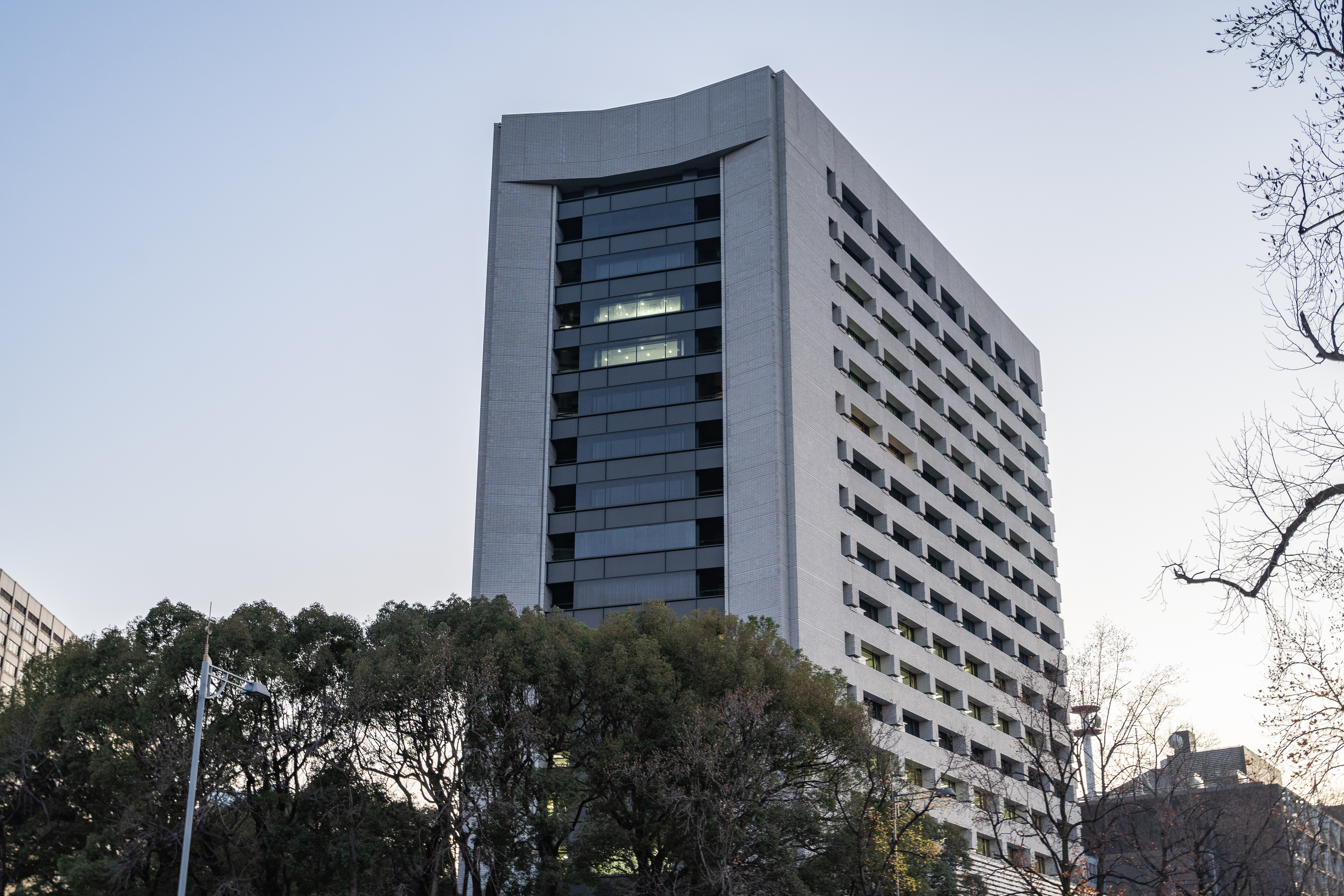
The PSB is located inside the TMPD.

The PSB is structured according to the following:

General Administration Division (公安総務課)
In addition to four deputy managers mandated for indoor service (General Affairs (庶務), Accounts (会計), Public Security Planning (公安企画) and Public Security Ordinance (公安法令)), there are eight deputy managers mandated for public security investigation. The Fifth and Sixth Deputy Manager of Public Security Investigation are mandated for counter-terrorism investigations, and from the First to Fourth are mandated for others.
First Public Security Division (公安第一課)
There are four deputy managers and ten units, mainly mandated for public security investigation against left-wing groups, labor unrest and left-wing rebel groups.
Second Public Security Division (公安第二課)
There are four deputy managers and nine units, all are mandated for public security investigation against right-wing groups.
Third Public Security Division (公安第三課)
There are three deputy managers and five units, all are mandated for public security investigation against lone wolf terrorism.
Fourth Public Security Division (公安第四課)
There are two deputy managers and units, mandated for Collection and storage of materials, and specially assigned public security investigative.
First Foreign Affairs Division (外事第一課)
There are three deputy managers and five units, mainly mandated for public security investigation and counterintelligence affairs related to Europe.
Second Foreign Affairs Division (外事第二課)
There are two deputy managers and five units, mandated for public security investigation and counterintelligence affairs related to Asia and China.
Third Foreign Affairs Division (外事第三課)
There are two deputy managers and four units, mandated for public security investigation and counterintelligence affairs related to North Korea. It was formerly in charge of matters concerning counterterrorism prior to revamping from 2019.
Fourth Foreign Affairs Division (外事第四課)
There are four deputy managers and six units, mandated for public security investigation and counterintelligence affairs related to international terrorism.
Public Security Special Task Force / Public Security Mobile Investigation Unit (公安機動捜査隊)
Mandated for initial investigation under PSB's jurisdiction including criminal/espionage/terrorist cases. Also has an NBC Terrorist Investigation Unit.

=== Training ===
Prospective PSB officers are trained at the National Police Academy in intelligence gathering techniques.

== Known heads of PSB ==
- Shigeo Ito
- Masuo Okamura
- Norikiyo Hayashi
