= Bombing of the Fusetsu no Gunzo and Institute of Northern Cultures =

1972 terrorist incident in Japan

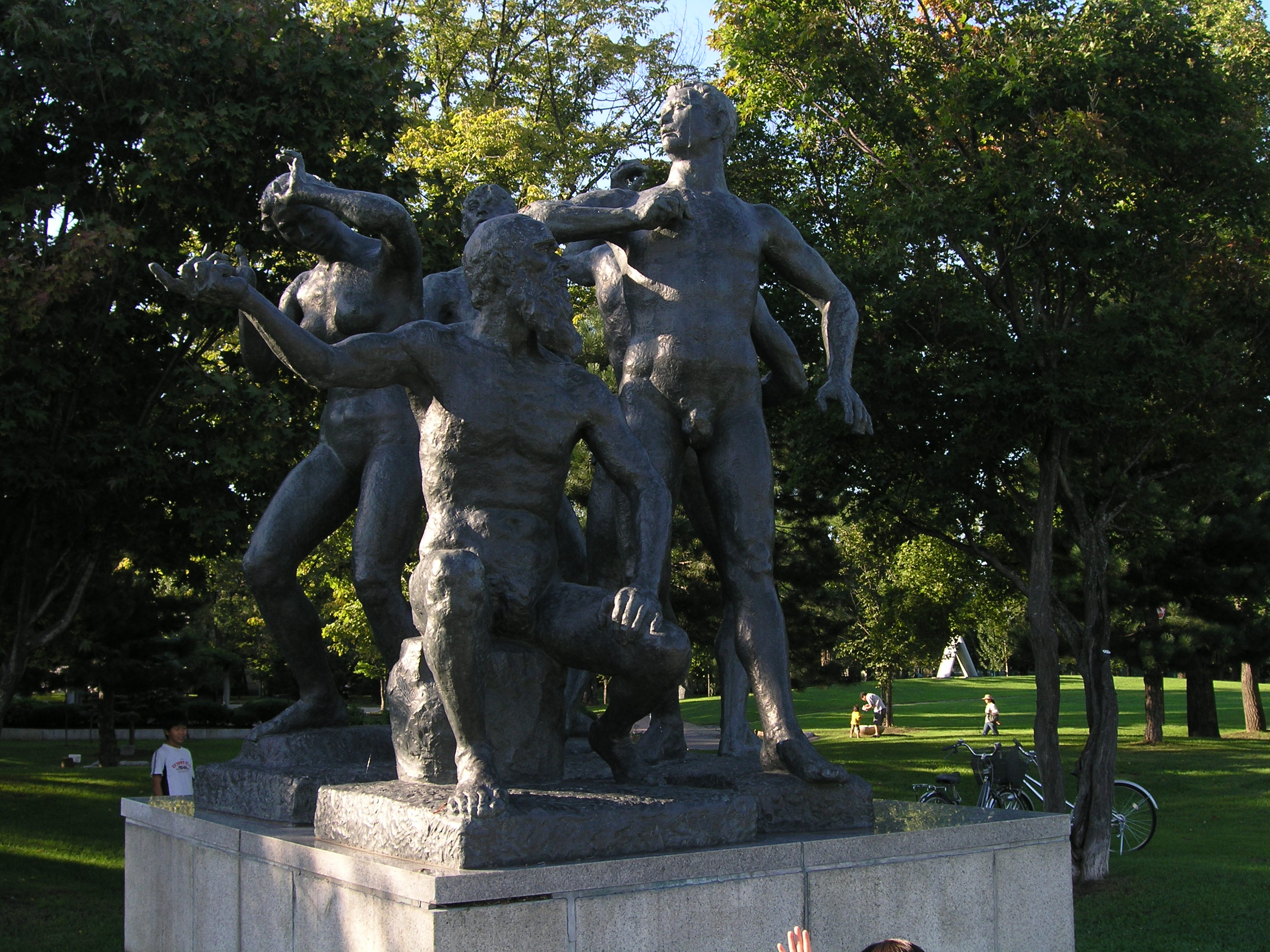
- The bombed monument in 2007.
- Location: Monument: 43.774536°N 142.356302°E; Institute: Monument: Tokiwa Park, Asahikawa, Japan; Institute: Hokkaido University, Kita-ku, Sapporo, Hokkaido, Japan
- Date: October 23, 1972 (UTC−09:00)
- Target: The Fusetsu no Gunzo monument and Institute of Northern Cultures building
- Attack type: Bombing
- Perpetrator: East Asia Anti-Japan Armed Front
- Motive: To eliminate symbols of historical Japanese imperialism

The Bombing of the Fusetsu no Gunzo and Institute of Northern Cultures (風雪の群像・北方文化研究施設爆破事件, Fūsetsu no Gunzō Hoppō Bunka Kenkyū Shisetsu Bakuha Jiken) was a terrorist bombing that occurred on 23 October 1972. It was undertaken by a group which would soon be known as the East Asia Anti-Japan Armed Front, though this name was not decided on until later in the same year.

== Targets ==
The Fusetsu no Gunzo, literally the Wind and Snow Group, is a bronze monument produced by the Japanese sculptors Shin Hongo and Meiji Honda located in Tokiwa Park in Asahikawa, Hokkaido. It depicts four Japanese colonists surrounding an elderly Ainu and was a project marking the 80th anniversary of the city and the 100th anniversary of Hokkaido's formation. The Institute of Northern Cultures is the Ainu cultural research center of Hokkaido University.

The Institute of Northern Cultures is an institute of Hokkaido University concerned with the research of Ainu culture.

The East Asia Anti-Japan Armed Front considered these two targets symbols of Japan's imperialistic aggression against the "Ainu Moshiri" or Ainu homeland and decided to blow them up. Masashi Daidoji in particular, the Hokkaido-born leading member of the plotters, had a special interest in the Japanese-Ainu conflict.

They set 23 October as the date of the bombing. This was the date on which Ainu chief Shakushain, who started Shakushain's Revolt, was murdered by the Matsumae Clan.

== Bombing ==
They split into two groups and arrived in Hokkaido on 23 October 1972. They each proceeded directly to their site and set the explosion for 11:30 PM. Both bombs exploded on time, and the Fusetsu no Gunzo was destroyed but the Institute of Northern Cultures escaped with relatively minor damage.

In 1977, the Fusetsu no Gunzo was restored, and it remains in place to the present day.

== Bibliography ==
- Ryuichi Matsushita『狼煙を見よ 東アジア反日武装戦線"狼"部隊』

（読売新聞社・戦後ニッポンを読む、1997） ISBN 4-643-97116-9
（河出書房新社・松下竜一その仕事22、2000） ISBN 4-309-62072-8
