= Anti-Japaneseism =

Theory from the New Left of Japan

Anti-Japaneseism (反日亡国論, han'nichi-bōkoku-ron) was a radical ideology promoted by a faction of the Japanese New Left that advocated for the destruction of the nation of Japan. The ideology was first conceived by Katsuhisa Ōmori, a member of the New Left, in the 1970s. Extending from anti-Japanese sentiments and viewpoints such as the Ainu Revolution Theory, Anti-Japaneseism makes claims that go far back in history, denying the founding of Japan and the history of the Japanese people. It advocated for the extermination of the Japanese ethnicity.

== Differences from anti-Japanism ==
The anti-Japanism theory posed that Japan's actions since the Meiji period have been tainted by imperialism, and that a new regime is needed. According to anti-Japanism, Japan's moral failure can be redeemed if the Imperial family is purged and the country forcibly transitions into a communist "people's republic". Anti-Japaneseism radicalized this argument by claiming that even the communist revolution could not redeem Japan because the Japanese themselves possess an inherent "aggressive nature". Proponents of this theory believe that the only way to redeem oneself from the "oppressive and criminal Japanese race" is to fight against all Japanese interests until the "Japanese" archipelago has been purged of anything Japanese.

From this standpoint, the so-called "Japanese" must be fully aware of themselves as an "oppressive/criminal people" and should deny themselves.

In this theory, since Japan is a counter-revolutionary nation that has accumulated crimes that cannot be amortized, and is an ugly shameful nation and ethnicity, thinking that Japan is the "homeland" is itself the greatest anti-revolutionary ideology. This theory preaches "Abandon Japanese consciousness of nation and ethnicity awareness thoroughly and be a traitor".

Only those who accept this theory of extinction against Japan, and who becomes a warrior for the anti-Japanese struggle, will be freed from the "original sin" of the "suppressive/criminal people" for the first time.

== Historical thesis ==
According to anti-Japaneseism, the original inhabitants of the Japanese archipelago were lawless agriculturalists but were invaded by an equestrian tribe from whom the current imperial family descends. Those who resisted the conquest became burakumin. The suppression continued through the 19th century as the imperial regime conquered the Ryukyuans and Ainu. Thus, the history of Japan is defined as "a history of invasion and exploitation".

== Final solution ==
The so-called "final solution" of anti-Japaneseism is to wipe the nation called "Japan" from the face of the earth and exterminate the Japanese race. Because, as described in the above historical theory, Japan is inherently evil, the continued existence of Japanese people is incompatible with peace. East Asia Anti-Japan Armed Front member Yoshimasa Kurosawa affirms that he is not opposed to any particular Japanese political regime, but to the existence of Japan itself.

== Strategy to extinguish Japanese ethnicity ==
The East Asia Anti-Japan Armed Front has suggested a scenario that could lead to the ruin of Japan. In this scenario, they would incite anti-government South Korean soldiers and topple the then-current South Korean "Chinilpa" (Park Chung Hee) military regime, replacing it with a military regime that is openly anti-Japanese. Japan, owing to its naturally aggressive nature, would invade South Korea in response, then the anti-Japaneseists could employ their terrorist networks to wreak havoc in South Korea similar to the Vietnam War, draining Japan's financial and political strength, which would allow its swift downfall.

The detailed scenario is as follows:

The main country of importance in this scenario is South Korea. By fostering South Korean's ethnic nationalism, it would fuel anti-Japanese sentiment, induce a coup d'état in the South Korean military, overthrow the "Chinilpa government", and eliminate the "Chinilpa" sentiments that are rooted in South Korea. Then, the South Korean "Anti-Chinilpa military government" would declare war on Japan, killing at least 100,000 Japan Self-Defense Forces personnel.

In Okinawa, the "Ryukyu Republic" would declare independence. This 'independent nation' would declare war on Japan and the United States, and then ally with South Korea to invade Japan.

In Hokkaido, the "Ainu-Soviet Republic" would also declare independence. They would claim that Japan ignored the Ainu, in incidences such as "Returning the Northern Territories", and the slaughter of 5 million Japanese people in Hokkaido who are "proud". This would also fuel anti-Japanese sentiment in Southeast Asia.

Using the network of the Japanese Red Army would prevent the export of crude oil to Japan by the Arab countries, the "Anti-Japan siege network" would surround Japan like the former ABCD line which was an economic sanction imposed on Japan taking the initials of national names, America (i.e. the United States), Britain, China, Dutch (i.e. the Netherlands) in 1940.

After "the destruction of Japan", most of the Japanese people would be sentenced to death regardless of age or sex, as the majority of them are "Japanese Empire nationals".

It is a scenario in which only comrades (World Revolution Ronin) who have abandoned ethnic and national consciousness and fought the anti-Japanese struggle are freed from their "original sin", and the Japanese ethnicity is extinguished from the earth.

== Influence on Japanese society ==
Since the eclipse of New Left influence, this group has been thought of as a bizarre cult. The activist who came up with the name "Anti-Japaneseism" has since left the group and describes it as "Satanic". The journalist Toshinao Sasaki describes life within the group as "insane". The education scholar Akira Moriguchi calls it a "violent ideology" and self-contradictory.

It has been suggested, however, that this ideology has provided the basis for other terrorist incidents such as the Tokyo subway sarin attack by Aum Shinrikyo on three lines of the Tokyo Metro (then part of the Tokyo subway) during rush hour, killing 12 people, severely injuring 50, and causing temporary vision problems for nearly 1,000 others.

== See also ==
- Ainu Revolution Theory
- Anti-Germans (political current)
- Autochauvinists
- East Asia Anti-Japan Armed Front
- Japan Revolutionary Communist League (Revolutionary Marxist Faction)
- Japanese Red Army
- Juche ideology
- New Left in Japan
- People's Democracy Party (South Korea)
- Revolutionary Communist League, National Committee
- Revolutionary Communist Party of China
- United Red Army
