= East Asia Anti-Japan Armed Front =

1972–1975 terrorist organization

East Asia Anti-Japan Armed Front 東アジア反日武装戦線
- Leader: Masashi Daidōji
- Dates active: 1972–1975
- Active regions: Japan
- Ideology: New Left; Anarchism; Anti-imperialism; Anti-Japaneseism

The East Asia Anti-Japan Armed Front (東アジア反日武装戦線, Higashi Ajia Hannichi Busō Sensen; EAAJAF) was a Japanese New Left terrorist organization that existed from 1972 to 1975.

The EAAJAF self-identified as a leftist group that espoused anti-Japaneseism ideology of revolution against the Japanese state, corporations, and symbols of Japanese imperialism, and was classified as a far-left illegal group inspired by anti-Japanese anarchism. The EAAJAF committed a series of bombings as three cells during the early 1970s, including the 1974 Mitsubishi Heavy Industries bombing, until it was disbanded when most of its membership were arrested by Japanese authorities.

== History ==
In 1973, the EAAJAF were preparing for their attacks, developing bombs and saving up a war chest to fund their operations. They constructed the bombs with the tools and basic necessities that they had on hand, but there were also members who dug under the floor of their own apartments and created underground bomb-making cellars. In addition, to bring their messages to the public they set about writing their own tract, the Hara Hara Tokei, which they published in March 1974. On 14 August 1974, they tried to blow up the iron bridge over which the Emperor Hirohito's royal train was travelling, which they code named the "Rainbow Operation". The plot was aborted because a member was spotted shortly before it was to be put into action.

=== Developments since the EAAJAF's demise ===
In January 2024, Japanese police said it had taken into its custody a man who it said claimed to be Satoshi Kirishima from a hospital in Kanagawa Prefecture. Kirishima was a member of the EAAJAF, who were suspected for bombings in Japan in the 1970s. At the time of his arrest, Kirishima was one of the most wanted men in Japan, having evaded capture for 49 years with his wanted poster found ubiquitously throughout the country. The man who claimed to be Kirishima had checked himself under another name into the hospital for terminal cancer and while undergoing treatment, told hospital staff that he was the fugitive Satoshi Kirishima and that he made this confession as he felt he would die soon and wanted to live what was left of his life under his real name. After the man made that statement, the police were called and he was arrested, with a DNA test taken on the man to try and confirm if he really was Kirishima or if the confession was false. The self-proclaimed Kirishima was taken in custody by the Tokyo Metropolitan Police. He told investigators some details about the attack.

On January 29, 2024, the man who claimed to be Kirishima died of the cancer that had led him to seek hospital treatment. The results of the confirmatory DNA test were not yet finished at the time of his death but later indicated that the deceased was likely Kirishima.

== Distinguishing characteristics ==
Perhaps because they were originally classmates, the EAAJAF was known for rejecting the "internal struggle" (内ゲバ, uchigeba), which manifested as sometimes violent self-criticism sessions popular within Japanese New Left groups, in order to expose those among their members who were not ideologically pure. The United Red Army, for example, murdered 14 of its 29 members in less than a year through such sessions. By contrast, there were no bloody purges in the EAAJAF and those members who had family commitments or were unable to mentally endure the struggle were permitted to leave without penalty. Nahoko Arai, who helped write Hara Hara Tokei, and Yoshimi Fujisawa, who was part of the group's early trainings with explosives, both left the group without incident after raising personal issues.

=== Ideology ===
As they studied the history of aggression by Japan against Korea and the Ainu, the EAAJAF acquired its personal "anti-Japanese ideology". They considered not only those in power, but also Japanese corporations and laborers as "perpetrators of imperialist aggression" and believed that they were acceptable targets for attack. Hara Hara Tokei refers to the Japanese people with a name of their own creation, as nittei hongokujin (Japanese: 日帝本国人), meaning "people born of Japanese imperialism", and condemns all ordinary citizens who did not support the "anti-Japanese struggle" as active members of the empire. In their claim of responsibility released after the 1974 bombing of Mitsubishi Heavy Industries they justified the indiscriminate terrorist attack by saying "People who were wounded or who died in the bombing are not uninvolved normal citizens. They are colonialists". Because of these dangerous and overly self-righteous ideas, even with the influence of the then New Left the number of people who supported the EAAJAF was few. Even the Front's leader, Masashi Daidōji, eventually apologized for his tactics.

== See also ==
- Anarchism in Japan
- Red Army Faction (Japan)
- Japanese Red Army
- Tori Kudo
- Revolutionary Communist League, National Committee
- Japan Revolutionary Communist League (Revolutionary Marxist Faction)
- Anti-Germans (political current)
