= Anti-White racism =

Discrimination against White people and culture

Anti-White racism is discrimination, prejudice and acts of hostility of a racist nature toward people racialized as White (especially those from Europe and its diasporas). It can manifest in various forms, including but not limited to ethnic hatred, stereotyping, exclusion, or violence, and can occur in both overt and subtle ways.

The term "anti-White racism" originated in the 1960s, describing racist acts against White people recognized historically and politically (notably in France and by figures like Pierre Paraf). The concept of reverse racism in the U.S. context is often used by opponents of affirmative action. Claims of anti-White racism have been made since the 1980s and have become more common since the 2010s. Examples of anti-White racism include attacks targeting White individuals and anti-White sentiments in post-apartheid South Africa and Zimbabwe, as well as in some parts of Europe and North America.

Some deny the existence of anti-White racism in majority-White countries, arguing that minority groups are incapable of racism due to systemic racism and prejudice plus power definitions. The subject is contentious, with differing perspectives on its prevalence, impact, and comparison to other forms of racial discrimination. Most legal systems do not formally distinguish racism by race or ethnicity of the victims, and courts have occasionally ruled on cases involving racist insults or violence against White individuals.

== Concepts and study ==
=== In philosophy ===
According to Magali Bessone, professor of political philosophy at the Panthéon-Sorbonne University in Paris, if the phenomenon of racism is considered in a structural manner, then the notion of anti-White racism is not relevant "in societies where Whites are in a position of domination. [Which] does not prevent the existence of individual behaviors that can be designated in this case as falling within the scope of racial hatred. And the definition of racism must probably be both individual and institutional."

According to Jorge L. A. Garcia, philosophy professor at Boston College, "the claim that Black racism is more dangerous than White in urban areas 'where blacks control power' may have little application in our nation", yet Black racism is an "ugly phenomenon" and "damaging to the cause of racial justice."

=== In social sciences ===
Sociology studies racism by taking into account specific socio-historical contexts and the prior existence, in Western societies, of ideologies and policies that have historically given Whites the role of the dominant race. Researchers distinguish between what is racist behavior—rejection, anger, insults, aggression, etc.—of an individual nature, and the existence of systemic racism, i.e. racism that is embedded in the social organization.

Pooja Sawrikar, a psychologist, and Ilan Katz, a social work researcher at the University of New South Wales, challenge the definition of racism which they summarize as "Racism = Prejudice + Power". Describing this approach as reductionist, they refute definitions of racism based on social power, which they believe reduce racism to White supremacy in White-majority societies. Thus, the idea that only White people can be racist would be flawed and itself racist. Furthermore, they write that this approach, which places White people at the center of any discourse on race, leads to impotence in the fight against racism. This helplessness would manifest itself in a feeling of guilt among White people, due to the fact that they cannot do anything individually against racism since they are oppressors by virtue of their skin color, and a feeling of helplessness among ethnic minorities, who would be forced to admit that racism is a condition that they cannot change. This approach would also encourage passivity, both among White people not participating in the anti-racist struggle, who would be content with their assigned role as the dominant group, and among racial minorities, who would reject any responsibility because of their minority status.

French political scientist, sociologist and historian Pierre-André Taguieff considers that the notions of institutional racism, structural racism or systemic racism derive from the anti-racist definition of racism produced by revolutionary African-American activists at the end of the 1960s. According to him, these terms are not the expression of a conceptualization of racism, but "a symbolic weapon which consists of reducing racism to White racism supposed to be inherent to 'White society' or to 'White domination', the latter being the only form of racial domination recognized and denounced by neo-antiracists." With White society being conceptualized as intrinsically racist, "it follows that anti-White racism cannot exist. This is a fundamental article of faith of the new 'anti-racist' catechism."

French political scientist Laurent Bouvet argues that "so-called anti-racist activists who claim that 'anti-White' racism does not exist do so from a purely political perspective", writing that "racism is an anthropological phenomenon, both cultural and social, which affects all human societies." "Racism exists everywhere, in all social groups, and is expressed, practically or theoretically, against the 'Other' on the basis of an identity linked to skin color or ethno-cultural origin."

For Daniel Sabbagh, research director at the Center for International Research (CERI) in Paris, racism can be understood from three points of view. The first is ideological racism, based on the hierarchy of races defined by a racialization of humanity. The second is attitudinal racism, the subject of studies in social psychology in particular, which conceives racism as a set of negative attitudes towards the racialized other. The third is systemic racism. The researcher believes that the use of the expression "anti-White racism" is not abusive to characterize, for example, the ideological or attitudinal racism inevitably produced in reaction to the racism suffered, without common measure, by non-Whites. He cites as examples the ideological speech of Elijah Muhammad, leader of the Nation of Islam (NOI), likening Whites to demons, and the video of the French rapper Nick Conrad, entitled "Pendez les Blancs" (Hang the Whites). Daniel Sabbagh agrees that if we only consider systemic racism, as a conception of racism, then the expression "anti-White racism" is irrelevant. He believes, however, that racism must be studied in all its dimensions.

=== In the media ===
BBC News editor Mark Easton cites the Ross Parker murder case to argue that society has been forced to redefine racism and discard the definition of "prejudice plus power"—a definition which, in Easton's view, tends to only allow ethnic minorities to be victims and Whites to be perpetrators. He states, "Describing an incident as racist may say as much about a victim's mindset as the offender. How else can one explain the British Crime Survey finding that 3,100 car thefts from Asians were deemed to be racially motivated?" Journalist Yasmin Alibhai-Brown argues that the case highlights double standards of racial equality campaigners, suggesting Black activists should "march and remember victims like Ross Parker ... our values are worthless unless all victims of these senseless deaths matter equally". She writes, "to treat some victims as more worthy of condemnation than others is unforgivable and a betrayal of anti-racism itself".

The Sunday Times in a 2006 investigation by Brendan Montague examined British newspaper archives for coverage of racist crimes, reporting "an almost total boycott of stories involving the white victims of attacks" whereas "cases involving black and minority ethnic victims are widely reported". The BBC Editorial Standards Committee in 2007 found that "there was no evidence to suggest that the BBC had shown a specific and systemic bias in favour of cases where the victim had been black or Asian", but accepted it had "underplayed its coverage of the Ross Parker case" and repeated the failings in its coverage of the murder of Kriss Donald.

Following violent acts during French high school demonstrations on March 8, 2005, and their media coverage, journalist Luc Bronner's article in the newspaper Le Monde, entitled "High school student demonstrations: the specter of anti-White violence" caused a media-political controversy in France over the labeling of this violence as "anti-White". (Note: This article mentioned the comments of young people from housing estates who claimed to have participated in the violence: "In the discourse of these young people, there were economic explanations ("making easy money"), playful explanations ("the pleasure of hitting") and a mixture of racism and social jealousy ("taking revenge on Whites").") Following Luc Bronner's article, a number of personalities including Ghaleb Bencheikh, Alain Finkielkraut, Bernard Kouchner and Jacques Julliard, launched on March 25, 2005, an "Appeal against 'anti-White racial attacks'", initiated by the left-wing Zionist movement Hashomer Hatzair and the Jewish community radio station Radio Shalom. A signatory of the appeal, Pierre-André Taguieff believes that the violence reveals the existence of anti-White racism in France, a reflection of a "racialization of social conflict" and that racism is not solely the work of Whites. Despite the International League Against Racism and Anti-Semitism (LICRA) considering the racist nature of the attacks to be proven, several anti-racist organizations, such as SOS Racisme, the MRAP and the Human Rights League (LDH), denounced the appeal as "irresponsible".

=== In law enforcement ===
Peter Fahy, the former spokesman on race issues for the British Association of Chief Police Officers said: "A lot of police officers and other professionals feel almost the best thing to do is to try and avoid [discussing such attacks] for fear of being criticised. This is not healthy". He added that "it was a fact that it was harder to get the media interested where murder victims were young white men". Montague suggests the lack of police appeals in cases involving White victims may be a cause of the lack of media coverage. Evidence of this was seen in the Parker case, with the police initially appearing keen to dismiss the possible racist aspect of the murder, stating "there was no reason to believe that the attack was racially motivated".

== Terminology ==
According to Emmanuel Debono, doctor of contemporary history at the Paris Institute of Political Studies, the first major controversies surrounding "anti-White racism" around the world took place in the 1960s in response to the Congo Crisis, particularly in France.

Pierre-André Taguieff says that the expression "anti-White racism" appears in the book Racism in the World (1964) by Pierre Paraf, president of the MRAP, at the time a "Third World organization of communist obedience", according to the political scientist. In his book, Paraf wrote, with regard to certain behaviors among African and Asian peoples formerly colonized by Europeans, that "the very nature of racism implies that it is no more foreign to 'men of color' than to whites." The president of the MRAP then emphasized his point: "Anti-Jewish racism, anti-Black racism, anti-White racism... whether collective or individual, racism remains one of the great evils from which mankind suffers today." Taguieff says that the National Front has effectively instrumentalized the denunciation of "anti-White racism" in France by making it "one of its propaganda themes, and some far-right publicists have seized on the theme in order to criminalize immigration of non-European origin." However, the political scientist stresses that the expression should not be considered "contaminated by its Le Penist use" in order to deny or minimize "the reality of the phenomenon", or to intimidate those who evoke anti-White racism.

== By country ==
=== France ===
Claims of racism against White people in France have been brought forward by various far-right parties, and other groups beginning in the 1980s, including from the right and left. In September 2012, Jean-François Copé, the leader of the Union for a Popular Movement (UMP), and then incumbent for his reelection, denounced the development of an anti-White prejudice by people living in France, some of them French citizens, against the "Gauls", a name among immigrants for the native French, according to him, on the basis of these having a different religion, color skin, and ethnic background. The former Minister of the Interior, Claude Guéant, went on record stating that this kind of racism is a reality in France and that there is nothing worse than the political elite hiding from the truth. When questioned on the subject, Prime Minister Jean-Marc Ayrault, a Socialist, acknowledged that such racism "can exist"; however, he indicated that one must be "very careful when using words of this nature", warning against "a kind of chase behind the ideas of the National Front". His government's Minister of Women's Rights, Najat Vallaud-Belkacem, echoed this view when, in her book Raison de plus! (2012), she called on everyone to recognize the reality of such racism and to condemn it like all others. In December 2023, when questioned about the Crépol attack that led to the death of Thomas Perotto, former Prime Minister Édouard Philippe considered that it is "quite possible that there is a new form of anti-White racism" in France. This opinion was shared by Minister of the Interior Gérald Darmanin, who added that "Not saying [that this racism] exists is not telling the truth." In March 2025, Government spokesperson Sophie Primas said she has "no shame" in evoking the existence of "anti-White racism". Later that month, Fabien Roussel, national secretary of the French Communist Party (PCF), declared: "Of course [anti-White racism] exists", for which he was criticized.

==== Legal cases ====
French law does not categorize racist offenses according to the victim's ethnic origin; the judicial treatment of such offenses never includes the term "anti-White" in the qualification of the incriminating facts. However, the press sometimes uses the term when reporting on court cases involving racism against a White victim. For example, in December 2012, the Criminal Court of Versailles sentenced an individual who had called his neighbor a "dirty White woman". Found guilty of "public insults of a racist nature", he was sentenced to a two-month suspended prison sentence with a two-year probation period. In January 2014, a case of assault on a public road, during which insults such as "dirty White" or "dirty French" were uttered, went on trial. At the end of the trial, the Court of Appeal of Paris upheld the aggravating circumstance of "racism". In March 2016, the Court of Appeal of Lyon increased the first instance sentence of an individual convicted of racial insults by three months in prison. The defendant had called a train passenger a "dirty White man, dirty Frenchman". Following the appeal judgment, Alain Jakubowicz, the president of the anti-racist association LICRA, declared that "all forms of racism are condemnable, wherever they come from and regardless of the victim's skin color, origin or religion. While anti-White racism is a relatively marginal phenomenon compared to other forms of racism or antisemitism, it must be subject to the same rigor and reprobation."

In September 2018, French rapper Nick Conrad broadcast on the web a song and video called "Pendez les Blancs" (Hang the Whites), for which he was later prosecuted. In particular, the judges found that "the terms of the song, accompanied by violent and brutal images, directly incite the Internet user to commit attacks on the lives of White people".

==== Public opinion ====
In a sociological survey conducted in 2008 by the French Institute for Demographic Studies (INED), which never uses the expression "anti-White racism", it appears that 16% of the majority population of France, i.e. the White population, say they have been the victim of a "racist situation", compared to 32% for immigrants and 36% for descendants of immigrants. 23% of the majority population say they "have not experienced a racist situation but feel exposed to it", compared to 29% for immigrants and 25% for descendants of immigrants. In addition, 10% of people of European origin say they have suffered racist discrimination in the last five years, compared to 26% for immigrants, 31% for descendants of two immigrant parents and 17% for descendants of one immigrant parent. The most reported grounds for discrimination by the majority population are 18% related to origin, compared to 70% for immigrants and 65% for descendants of immigrants.

In 2012, INED published a new survey conducted between September 2008 and February 2009 on people born between 1948 and 1990, which showed that 18% of people belonging to the "majority population" said they had been "the target of racist insults, remarks or attitudes" compared to 30% for immigrants and 37% for descendants of immigrants. However, a study by the same institute concluded in 2016 that the phenomenon was "not a mass experience": "Racism by minorities against majorities can be verbally offensive, or even physically aggressive, but it is not systematic and does not produce social inequalities." The same year, Jean-Luc Primon, a sociologist at the University of Nice and researcher at the Migrations and Society Research Unit (URMIS), participating in the TEO survey, the first INED database on origins, declared that a little more than one person in ten of those classified in the so-called "majority" population (neither immigrants, nor from immigration, nor from overseas) declared having experienced racism.

A 2022 survey found that 80% of French people believe that anti-White racism is present in some French communities.

=== Haiti ===
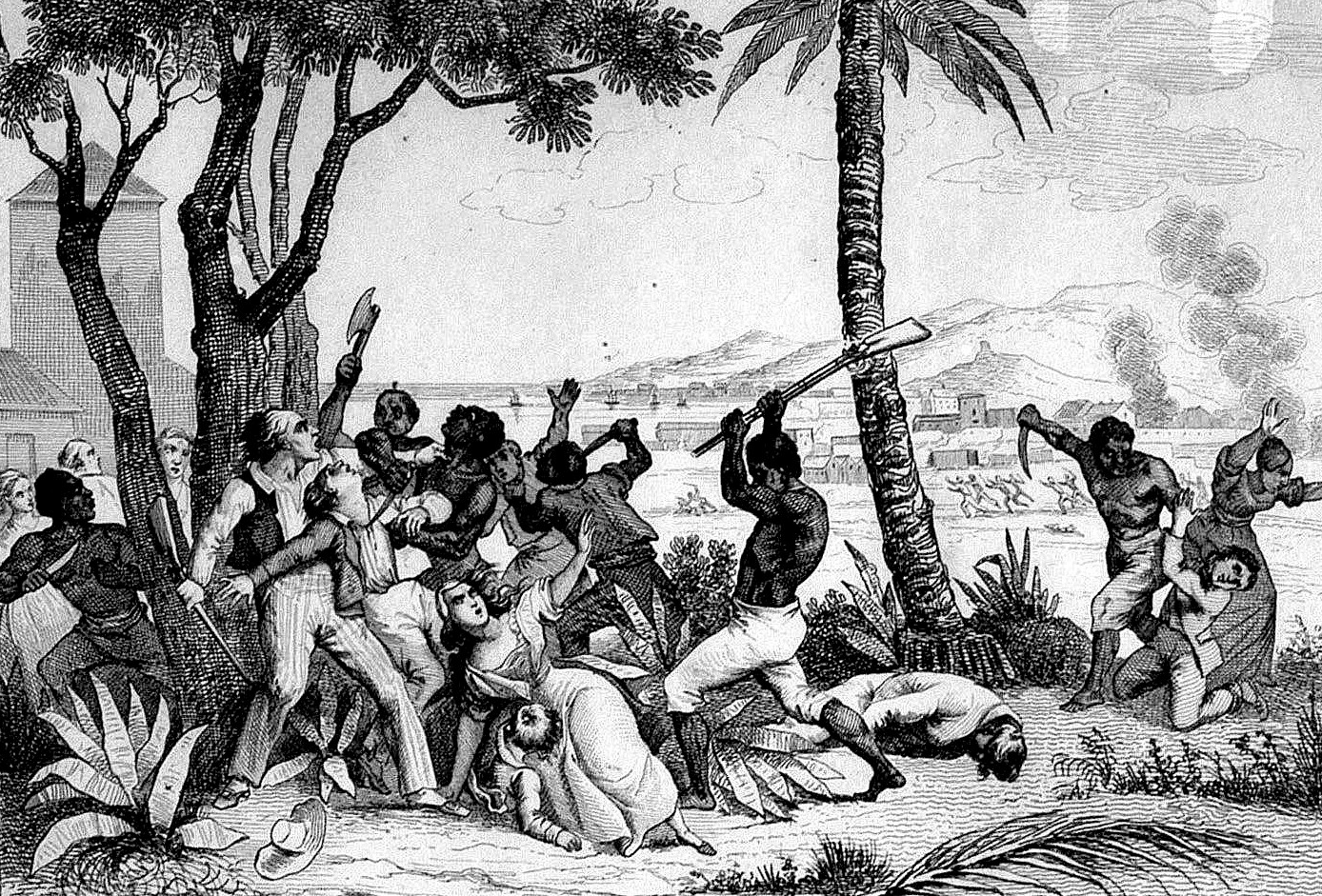
"Burning of the Plaine du Cap – Massacre of Whites by the Blacks." On August 22, 1791, slaves set fire to plantations, torched cities and massacred the White population.

The massacres of almost the entire White population in Haiti in 1804, also referred to as the Haitian genocide, which marked the end of the Haitian Revolution, have been partially explained in the context of anti-White racism. On February 22, 1804, revolutionary leader Jean-Jacques Dessalines signed a decree ordering that all French people still residing in the country should be put to death. Dessalines' secretary Louis Boisrond-Tonnerre complained that the declaration of independence was not aggressive enough, saying that "...we should have the skin of a white man for parchment, his skull for an inkwell, his blood for ink, and a bayonet for a pen!".

The people chosen to be killed were targeted primarily based on three criteria: "skin color, citizenship and vocation." While some Whites, such as Poles and Germans who were granted citizenship and "a few non-French veterans and American merchants, along with some useful professionals such as priests and doctors" were spared, political affiliation was not considered. The White victims were almost entirely French, commensurate with their share in the White population of Haiti. About his targets of the massacre, Dessalines' slogan exemplified his mission to eradicate the White population with the saying "Break the eggs, take out the [sic] yoke [a pun on the word 'yellow' which means both yoke and mulatto] and eat the white." Upper class Whites were not the only target; any white of any socioeconomic status was also to be killed, including the urban poor known as petits blancs (little whites). During the massacre, stabbing, beheading, and disemboweling were common.

Historian Philippe R. Girard also states that if, after 1804 and throughout the 19th century, the presence of Whites in the country was negligible, they were perceived, in particular by Haitian nationalists, with an antipathy that amounted to racism, excluding alliances with countries with generally White populations such as the United States and European countries, or considered too light-skinned, such as the Dominican Republic. The Black population, a large majority (90% at the beginning of the 19th century), tended to consider themselves the only true Haitian population, calling themselves "authentic", with the exception of the mulattos, who were viewed with great suspicion because of their French fathers as well as their frequent possession of slaves before independence. The word blan, meaning "white man", came to designate the foreigner, and carried a negative connotation that that of neg, literally "negro", did not have.

=== South Africa ===
Milton Shain, professor emeritus of the Department of Historical Studies at the University of Cape Town, said that Indian, Coloureds, and White minorities are increasingly being scapegoated by South Africa's ruling African National Congress (ANC). In 2001, former South African president Nelson Mandela criticized the growing racial intolerance of Black South Africans in their attitudes toward South Africans of other racial groups.

According to Sharlene Swartz, a research specialist of the Human Sciences Research Council (HSRC), discourses expressing violent resentment towards White populations in South Africa are widespread, citing as an example student protests during which the inscription "Fuck White People" appeared on t-shirts and walls.

Many consider the Economic Freedom Fighters (EFF) to be black nationalist and anti-white, citing incidents such as leader Julius Malema's performances of the song "Dubul' ibhunu" (meaning "Kill the Boer" in Xhosa and Zulu) as evidence. Malema himself is also frequently accused of racism against White South Africans.

=== United Kingdom ===
==== Public opinion ====
In 2019, a British government inquiry by the Equality and Human Rights Commission (EHRC) into racism in universities found that 9% of White British students reported experiencing racial harassment, including anti-English, anti-Welsh and anti-Scottish sentiments (compared to 29% of Black students, 27% of Asian students and 22% of other non-White or mixed race students). Academics of color have criticized the Commission for including harassment against White students in the statistics, which they say shows a worrying misunderstanding of racism as it "minimises the racism by including groups who do not experience racial prejudice". Prominent academics and student leaders have criticized the Commission for "drawing a false equivalence between what it described as racial harassment against White British students and staff and the racism suffered by their Black and minority ethnic peers". The EHRC did not respond to requests to remove anti-White harassment from the report, explaining that "its report made clear that racial harassment predominantly affects Black and Asian students".

=== United States ===
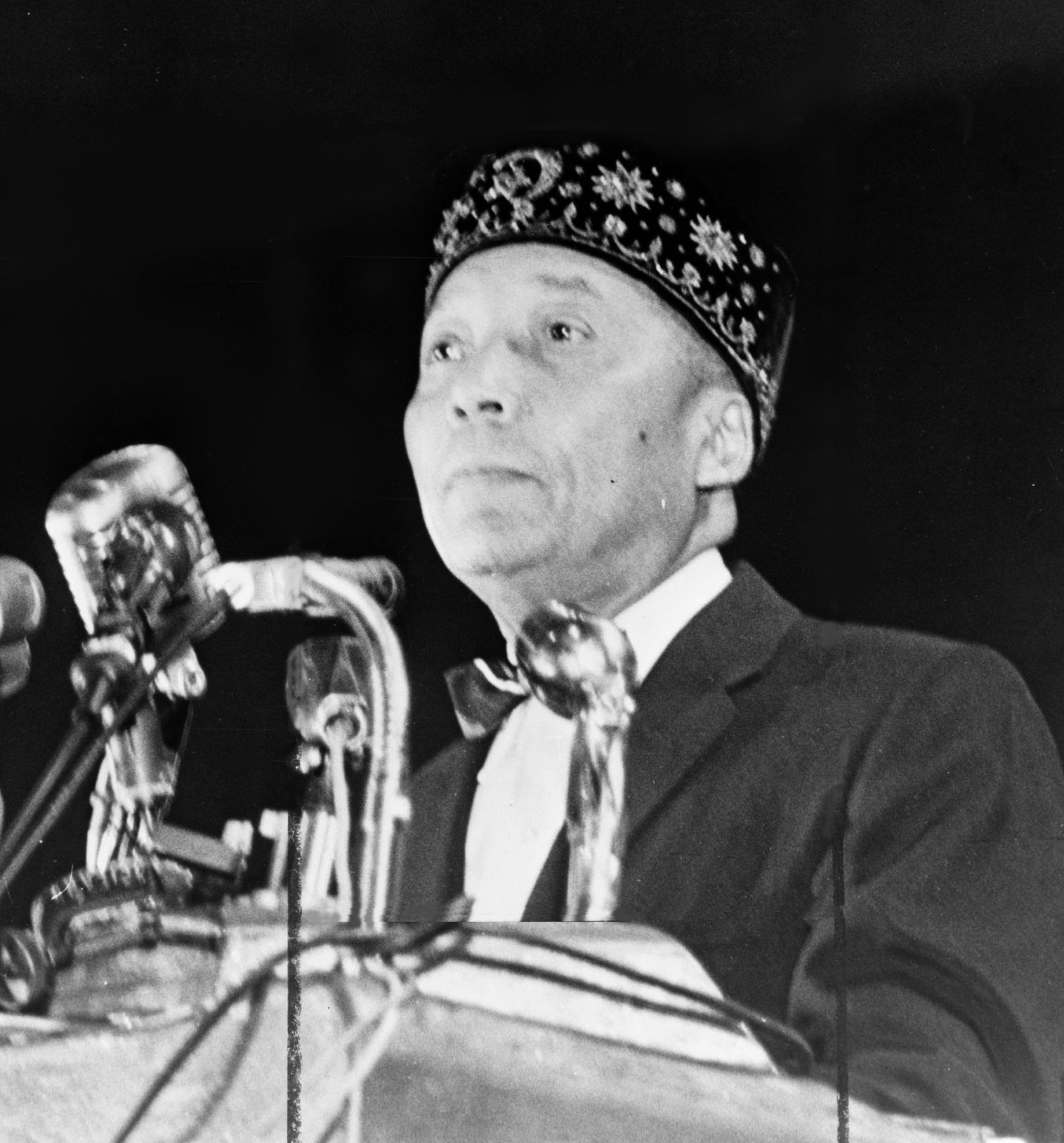
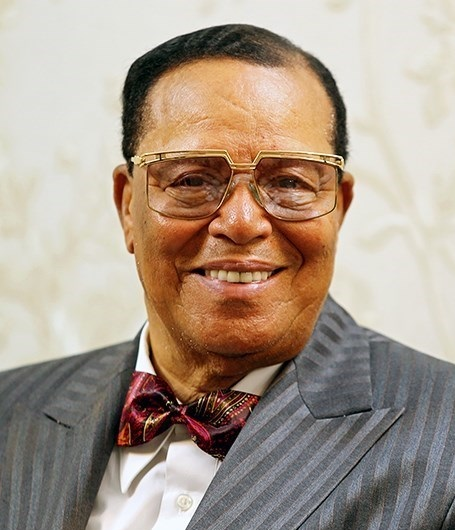
The speeches of Elijah Muhammad (pictured left) and Louis Farrakhan (right), both leaders of the Nation of Islam (NOI), often emphasized hatred of Whites.

There are Black supremacists in the United States who advocate the superiority of the "Black race", including organized groups such as the Nation of Islam (NOI) and the New Black Panther Party (NBPP). These groups have repeatedly been accused of stirring up racial hatred against Whites. The Southern Poverty Law Center (SPLC) classifies the NBPP as a Black separatist hate group and says that its leaders "have advocated the killing of Jews and white people", while it describes the NOI as having a "theology of innate black superiority over whites". The NOI was notably represented by Malcolm X and Khalid Abdul Muhammad, who made anti-White speeches and called for the murder of White Americans and White South Africans. According to the NOI, Whites were created 6,600 years ago as a "race of devils" by an evil scientist named Yakub, a story which originated with the founder of the NOI, Wallace D. Fard. The speeches of Elijah Muhammad and Louis Farrakhan, both leaders of the NOI, also often emphasized hatred of Whites. For example, at an event in Milwaukee in August 2015, Farrakhan said: "White people deserve to die, and they know, so they think it's us coming to do it".

The United Nuwaubian Nation of Moors, a Black supremacist group, founded and led by Dwight York, has been described by the SPLC as advocating the belief that Black people are superior to White people. The SPLC reported that York's teachings included the belief that "whites are 'devils', devoid of both heart and soul, their color the result of leprosy and genetic inferiority". Another Black supremacist group, the Nation of Yahweh, founded by Hulon Mitchell Jr., also known as Yahweh ben Yahweh, has been described by the SPLC as racist, stating that the group believes that Black people are the true Israelites and Whites hold "wicked powers". The SPLC also claims that the group believes that Yahweh ben Yahweh had a Messianic mission to vanquish Whites and that it held views similar to those of the Christian Identity movement, which believes that "Aryans" are the true Israelites and non-Whites are devils. The Nation of Yahweh had eliminated calls for violence and toned down its anti-White rhetoric by 2007, but remained Black supremacist and antisemitic in its ideology.

Proponents of the pseudoscientific "melanin theory" argue that Whites suffer from a melanin deficiency that makes them inferior to Blacks in athletic, intellectual and spiritual terms. According to Bernard Ortiz de Montellano, anthropology professor at Wayne State University in Detroit, this theory, which has been popular with some proponents of Afrocentrism and Black supremacists, including professor of Black studies Leonard Jeffries and psychologist Frances Cress Welsing, "reactivates biological racism."

==== Public opinion ====
A 2017 poll found that 55% of White Americans believe that White people face discrimination. A 2022 poll found that 64% of Republicans polled said White people experience a fair amount of hate or discrimination in society. A 2023 YouGov poll found that of Trump 2020 voters, 73% say that racism against White Americans is a problem.

=== Zimbabwe ===
As president of Zimbabwe from 1980 until 2017, Robert Mugabe made statements deemed racist towards Whites, referring to White Rhodesians as "blood-sucking exploiters", "sadistic killers", and "hard-core racists". He called on supporters "to strike fear in the hearts of the white man, our real enemy", and accused his Black opponents of being dupes of the Whites. In one typical example, taken from a 1978 radio address, Mugabe declared: "Let us hammer [the White man] to defeat. Let us blow up his citadel. Let us give him no time to rest. Let us chase him in every corner. Let us rid our home of this settler vermin".

In December 2008, the Southern African Development Community (SADC) Tribunal, in the case of Mike Campbell (Pvt) Ltd v Zimbabwe, accused Mugabe and his government of waging a racist political campaign in which land confiscations were carried out in a discriminatory manner. The government and the Supreme Court of Zimbabwe contested the tribunal's decision. However, in 2016, noting the harmful impact of his measures on agricultural production, Mugabe called for the return to the country of White farmers forced into exile.

In 2017, new President Emmerson Mnangagwa's inaugural speech promised to pay compensation to the White farmers whose land was seized during the land reform program. Rob Smart became the first White farmer whose land was returned after President Mnangagwa was sworn in to office; he returned to his farm in Manicaland province by military escort. During the World Economic Forum 2018 in Davos, Mnangagwa also stated that his new government believes thinking about racial lines in farming and land ownership is "outdated", and should be a "philosophy of the past."

== See also ==
- 2017 Fresno shootings
- Anti-Black racism
- Anti-Europeanism
- Anti-Western sentiment
- AfriForum
- Discrimination based on skin tone
- Equal opportunity
- HC 929002 – anti-White racism case in Brazil (2024)
- In-group favoritism
- Jeremy Carl
- Murder of Richard Everitt
- Outgroup favoritism
- Racial color blindness
- Substantive equality
- Xenophobia

== Bibliography ==
- Ansell, Amy Elizabeth (2013). ""Hierarchy", "Racialisation", "racism" "Reverse Racism"". Race and Ethnicity: The Key Concepts. Routledge. ISBN 978-0-415-33794-6.
- Barrett, David V. (2001). The New Believers: A Survey of Sects, Cults and Alternative Religions. London: Cassell and Co. ISBN 978-0-304-35592-1.
- Blair, David (2002). Degrees in Violence: Robert Mugabe and the Struggle for Power in Zimbabwe. London and New York: Continuum. ISBN 978-0-8264-5974-9.
- Blancpain, François (2003). Un siècle de relations financières entre Haïti et le France : 1825-1922 (in French). L'Harmattan. ISBN 978-2-7475-0852-0.
- Cashmore, Ernest; Cashmore, Ellis; Van Den Berghe, Pierre L.; Banton, Michael; Jennings, James; Troyna, Barry (1996). Dictionary of Race and Ethnic Relations. USA: Routledge. ISBN 978-0-415-15167-2.
- Debono, Emmanuel (2020). "Premières polémiques autour du racisme anti-blanc en France (1960)". La modernité disputée: textes offerts à Pierre-André Taguieff (in French). CNRS éditions. ISBN 978-2-271-12952-9.
- De Montellano, Bernard R. Ortiz (1993). "Melanin, afrocentricity, and pseudoscience". American Journal of Physical Anthropology. 36 (S17): 33–58. Bibcode:1993AJPA...36S..33D. doi:10.1002/ajpa.1330360604. ISSN 1096-8644.
- Desmond, M.; Emirbayer, M. (2009). "What is Racial Domination?". Du Bois Review: Social Science Research on Race. 6 (2): 335–355. doi:10.1017/S1742058X09990166.
- Feagin, Joe R. (2006). Systemic Racism: A Theory of Oppression. Taylor & Francis. ISBN 0-415-95278-6.
- Ferguson, Stephen C. (2015). Philosophy of African American Studies: Nothing Left of Blackness. Palgrave Macmillan. pp. 56, 66–68. ISBN 9781137549976.
- Forde, James (2020). The Early Haitian State and the Question of Political Legitimacy: American and British Representations of Haiti, 1804—1824. Springer Nature. ISBN 978-3-030-52608-5.
- Garcia, J. L. A. (September 1, 1999). "Philosophical analysis and the moral concept of racism". Philosophy & Social Criticism. 25 (5): 1–32. doi:10.1177/0191453799025005001.
- Gardell, Mattias (1996). In the Name of Elijah Muhammad: Louis Farrakhan and The Nation of Islam. Durham: Duke University Press. ISBN 978-0-8223-1845-3.
- Girard, Philippe (2005a). "Caribbean genocide: racial war in Haiti, 1802–4". Patterns of Prejudice. 39 (2: Colonial Genocide): 138–161. doi:10.1080/00313220500106196. ISSN 0031-322X. S2CID 145204936.
- Girard, Philippe R. (2005b). "Missed Opportunities: Haiti after Independence (1804–1915)". Paradise Lost: Haiti's Tumultuous Journey from Pearl of the Caribbean to Third World Hot Spot. Palgrave Macmillan. pp. 55–75. doi:10.1057/9781403980311_4. ISBN 978-1-4039-8031-1.
- Howard-Hassmann, Rhoda E. (2010). "Mugabe's Zimbabwe, 2000–2009: Massive Human Rights Violations and the Failure to Protect". Human Rights Quarterly. 32 (4): 898–920. doi:10.1353/hrq.2010.0030. S2CID 143046672.
- Lentin, Alana (July 4, 2018). "Beyond denial: 'not racism' as racist violence". Continuum. 32 (4): 400–414. doi:10.1080/10304312.2018.1480309.
- Meredith, Martin (September 2007) [2002a]. Mugabe: Power, Plunder and the Struggle for Zimbabwe. New York: PublicAffairs. pp. 171–175. ISBN 978-1-58648-558-0.
- Meredith, Martin (2002b). Our Votes, Our Guns: Robert Mugabe and the Tragedy of Zimbabwe. New York: PublicAffairs. ISBN 978-1-58648-186-5.
- Mlambo, Alois S. (2014). A History of Zimbabwe. Cambridge University Press. pp. 222–224, 254–256. ISBN 978-1-139-86752-8.
- Morrow, Lance (June 24, 2001). "Controversies: The Provocative Professor". Time. Vol. 138, no. 8.
- Möschel, Mathias (2014). Law, Lawyers and Race: Critical Race Theory from the US to Europe. Abingdon, UK: Routledge. p. 119. ISBN 978-0-41-573930-6.
- Moses, Dirk A.; Stone, Dan (2013). Colonialism and Genocide. Routledge. ISBN 978-1-317-99753-5.
- Ndlovu-Gatsheni, Sabelo J. (2009a). "Africa for Africans or Africa for "Natives" Only? "New Nationalism" and Nativism in Zimbabwe and South Africa". Africa Spectrum. 44 (1): 61–78. doi:10.1177/000203970904400105. ISSN 0002-0397.
- Ndlovu-Gatsheni, Sabelo J. (2009b). "Making Sense of Mugabeism in Local and Global Politics: 'So Blair, keep your England and let me keep my Zimbabwe'". Third World Quarterly. 30 (6): 1139–1158. doi:10.1080/01436590903037424. S2CID 143775424.
- Newkirk, Pamela (2002). Within the Veil: Black Journalists, White Media. New York University Press. ISBN 978-0-8147-5800-7.
- Orizio, Riccardo (2001). Lost White Tribes: The End of Privilege and the Last Colonials in Sri Lanka, Jamaica, Brazil, Haiti, Namibia, and Guadeloupe. Simon & Schuster. ISBN 978-0-7432-1197-0.
- Palmer, Susan J. (2021a). "The United Nuwaubian Nation". In Zeller, Ben (ed.). Handbook of UFO Religions. Brill Handbooks on Contemporary Religion. Vol. 20. Leiden and Boston: Brill Publishers. pp. 343–353. doi:10.1163/9789004435537_017. ISBN 978-90-04-43437-0. ISSN 1874-6691. S2CID 236767801.
- Palmer, Susan J. (2021b). "The Ansaaru Allah Community". In Cusack, Carole M.; Upal, M. Afzal (eds.). Handbook of Islamic Sects and Movements. Brill Handbooks on Contemporary Religion. Vol. 21. Leiden and Boston: Brill Publishers. pp. 694–723. doi:10.1163/9789004435544_037. ISBN 978-90-04-43554-4. ISSN 1874-6691.
- Sawrikar, Pooja; Katz, Ilan (2010). "Only White People can be Racist: What does Power have to do with Prejudice ?" (PDF). Cosmopolitan Civil Societies Journal. 2 (1).
- Pezzullo, Ralph (2006). Plunging Into Haiti: Clinton, Aristide, and the Defeat of Diplomacy. Univ. Press of Mississippi. ISBN 978-1-60473-534-5.
- Rogers, J. A. (July 6, 2010). World's Great Men of Color. Vol. II. Simon & Schuster. ISBN 978-1-4516-0307-1.
- Taguieff, Pierre-André (2015). Une France antijuive ? Regards sur la nouvelle configuration judéophobe : antisionisme, propalestinisme, islamisme (in French). Paris: CNRS Éditions. ISBN 978-2-271-08700-3.
- Walker, Clarence E. (June 14, 2001). We Can't Go Home Again: An Argument About Afrocentrism. Oxford University Press. ISBN 978-0-19-535730-1.
