= Prejudice plus power =

Stipulative definition of racism used in the United States

Prejudice plus power, also known as R = P + P or R = P + W, is a stipulative definition of racism used in the United States. Patricia Bidol-Padva first proposed this definition in a 1970 book, where she defined racism as "prejudice plus institutional power". According to this definition, two elements are required in order for racism to exist: racial prejudice, and social power to codify and enforce this prejudice into an entire society. Adherents write that while all people can be racially prejudiced, minorities are powerless and therefore only the majority group has the power to be racist. This definition is supported by the argument that power is responsible for the process of racialization and that social power is distributed in a zero-sum game.

The People's Institute for Survival and Beyond (The People's Institute) has used this definition and affirmed that racism stemmed not just from individual prejudices but from institutional systems of power, such as wealth and privilege. In the context of this definition, The People's Institute maintained that the effects of systematic oppression have negatively impacted various communities, with impoverishment being a concern. It affirmed that prejudice is not the sole cause of racism and that since it is based institutionally and not individually, changing or removing these structures could then offset the effects of racism. The use of this definition intended to place emphasis on looking at racism in terms of community and not the individual.

== Criticism ==
Prejudice plus power has been criticized for taking a reductionist approach to racism, and for downplaying racial discrimination committed by non-white people by replacing the word racism with a less negatively perceived word, prejudice.

Some anti-racists argue that the stipulative definition will make dismantling anti-blackness more challenging due to claiming that only white people can commit racism and ignoring interminority racism. The definition also conflicts with critical race theory, through which racial prejudice describes two of the four levels of racism; internalized racism, and interpersonal racism. Internalized racism refers to racial prejudice that is internalized through socialization, while interpersonal racism refers to expressions of racial prejudice between individuals. Prejudice plus power attempts to separate forms of racial prejudice from the word racism, which is to be reserved for institutional racism. Critics point out that an individual can not be institutionally racist, because institutional racism (sometimes referred to as systemic racism) only refers to institutions and systems, hence the name. The definition has been criticized for relying on the assumption that race operates within a black–white binary and that power is a zero-sum game, and for not accounting for the lack of uniformity in prejudicial attitudes.

The reaction of students to this definition tends to be mixed, with some thinking that it makes sense, and others perceiving it as a form of cognitive dissonance. In 2004, Beverly Tatum wrote that many of her white students find it difficult to relate to this definition on a personal level, because they do not perceive themselves either as prejudiced or as having power.

== See also ==
- Double standard
- Global majority
- Reverse racism
- Substantive equality
- Tyranny of the majority
