= HC 929002 =

Anti-white racism case of Brazil's Superior Court of Justice

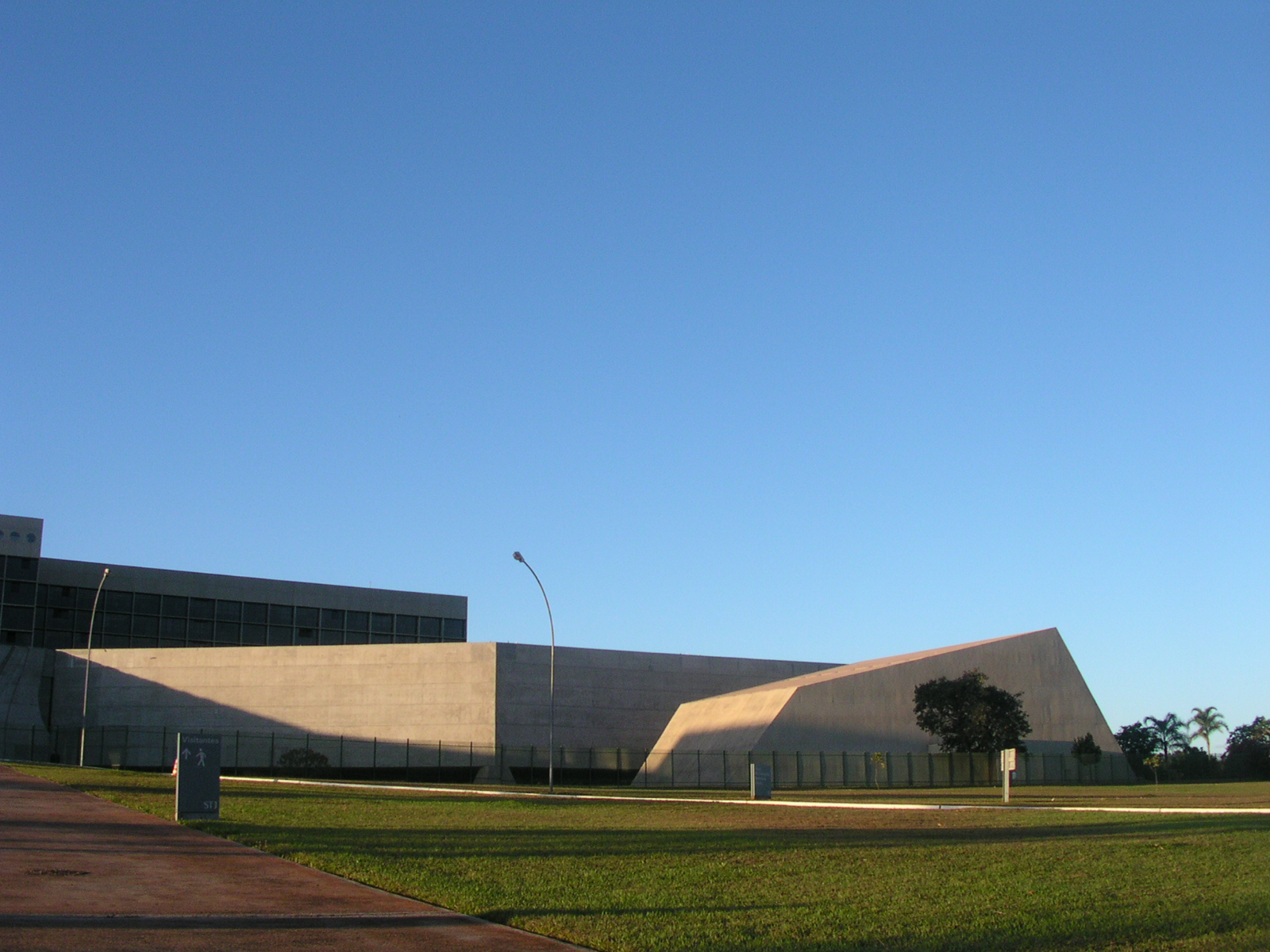
- Court: Superior Court of Justice
- Full case name: Habeas Corpus 929002
- Started: 14 August 2024 (23 months ago)
- Decided: 4 February 2025

Court membership
- Judges sitting: President Sebastião Reis Júnior Justices: Rogerio Schietti Cruz; Og Fernandes; Antonio Saldanha Palheiro; Otávio de Almeida Toledo

Case opinions
- Decision by: Fernandes
- Concurrence: Cruz, Júnior, Palheiro, Toledo

Keywords
- White privilege; Racism in Brazil; Anti-discrimination laws in Brazil

HC 929002 was a case of the Superior Court of Justice of Brazil concerning anti-White racism, sometimes referred to in Brazil as "reverse racism". (Note: The meaning of the expression "reverse racism" in Brazil differs from its international understanding, which usually refers to affirmative actions and other racial justice initiatives that some see as prejudicial to white people. In Brazil, the term describes actions of alleged anti-white discrimination or prejudice, usually when perpetrated by people of color, and is mostly considered a fallacy by specialists.) The question arose as to whether the Race Crimes Law (Law 7,716 of 1989), which prescribes harsher punishment for race-related hate crimes, also applied to white victims.

The case's rapporteur, minister Og Fernandes, cast the initial vote arguing that racism is a structural phenomenon that historically affects minority groups and, as such, the term does not apply to majority groups in positions of power; the Court unanimously agreed. With this decision, for cases with white victims, the crime should instead be considered that of regular injury, which has a more lenient punishment.

== Background ==
Due to Brazil's recent history with slavery, measures have been taken to prevent racial animosity in the country. Among them, legislation was written to consider what is called "racial injury" as a hate crime. After a 2023 amendment, article 2-A of Law 7,716 of 1989 (dubbed the "Race Crimes Law") reads:

Art. 2º-A Injuriar alguém, ofendendo-lhe a dignidade ou o decoro, em razão de raça, cor, etnia ou procedência nacional. Pena: reclusão, de 2 (dois) a 5 (cinco) anos, e multa.
Art. 2nd-A Injuring someone, damaging their dignity or the decorum, due to race, color, ethnicity or national origin. Punishment: prison, from 2 (two) to 5 (five) years, and fine.

In the case presented to the Superior Court, a black man was being sued by an Italian man for disparaging him after being hired for work but not getting paid. The black man was alleged to have called the Italian man, in a text message, a "white headed European slave-owner".

In July 2023, the Public Prosecutor's Office of Alagoas submitted a criminal complaint to have the perpetrator charged with racial injury, and the state's judiciary accepted the case in January 2024. The accused subsequently requested a habeas corpus, arguing that there exists no "reverse racism" (anti-white racism) and, as such, racial injury was not applicable to the case. This request became case HC 929002 of the Superior Court of Justice.

== Decision ==
The case's rapporteur, minister Og Fernandes, accepted the habeas corpus, arguing that the crime of racial injury aims to protect minority groups that are historically discriminated against, and that it can only happen when there exists a relationship of historical oppression. The minister continues:

The expression 'minority groups' undoubtedly [...] refers to those that, even if a numerical majority, are not equally represented in spaces of power, public and private; that are frequently discriminated against, including by the State; and that, in practice, have less access to the full exercise of citizenship. [...] It is not possible to believe that the white population in Brazil may be considered a minority. Thus, there is no way for the situation described in the records to correspond to the crime of racial injury.

While the Court does not view racial injury as an adequate description of the offense, it clarified that the ruling was not a decision on whether another crime may have occurred.

=== Judiciary representation ===
Third section (criminal law), sixth class
Supreme Court members	Ministers	Yes	No
Og Fernandes	1	1	
Rogerio Schietti Cruz	1	1	
Sebastião Reis Júnior	1	1	
Antonio Saldanha Palheiro	1	1	
Otávio de Almeida Toledo	1	1	
Total	05	05	00
