= Nick Conrad =

French rapper (born 1983)

Conrad Moukouri Manga Moussole (born 4 November 1983), known as Nick Conrad, is a French rapper. He was barely known before coming to national attention in 2018 for his song and video "Pendez les Blancs" (Hang the Whites), for which he was prosecuted. Conrad has defended the violent, anti-French and anti-white nature of his songs and videos as works of fiction and art.

== Early life ==
Conrad, of Noisy-le-Grand, Île-de-France, was born to a Cameroonian diplomat who came to France in the late 1970s and then lost his job. Through his father's interest in music, he was introduced to jazz, soul and African music, and from the age of six began to play saxophone and tuba. In the early 1990s, he discovered hip hop by listening to MC Solaar and Pete Rock & CL Smooth. His childhood was also marked by severe sickle cell disease, and he began writing in the hospital.

Conrad was barely known before his 2018 controversy, with his most high-profile appearance being on a 2011 telethon on France Ô.

== "Pendez les Blancs" ==
In September 2018, Conrad became the centre of national attention for his song and video "Pendez les Blancs" (Hang the Whites), released when he had 186 YouTube followers, 237 on Twitter, 40 on Spotify and around a thousand on Facebook. Despite being shared online by the French comedian Dieudonné M'bala M'bala, the video did not come to attention until it was shared further by members of the Identitarian movement. On 26 September, the video was then shared by larger accounts including Republican deputy Éric Ciotti, mayor of Nice Christian Estrosi, National Rally leader Marine Le Pen, RTL Group, RT and Valeurs actuelles. By the end of the day, a Paris court had begun an investigation.

Lyrics of the song include (in original and then translated):

Je rentre dans des crèches, je tue des bébés blancs, attrapez-les vite et pendez leurs parents, écartelez-les pour passer le temps divertir les enfants noirs de tout âge petits et grands. Fouettez-les fort faites-le franchement, que ça pue la mort que ça pisse le sang

I go into nurseries, I kill white babies, grab them quickly and hang their parents, pull them apart to pass the time to entertain black children of all ages, big and small. Whip them hard, whip them well, so they stink of death and piss blood

In March 2019, Conrad went on trial, was convicted and fined €5,000 and made to pay €1,000 damages to the anti-racist group LICRA and the Catholic group AGRIF. He announced an appeal and defended his work as art that was made to shock. In September 2021, his sentence was quashed on appeal, without a ruling on the merits of the case.

== "Doux pays" ==
In May 2019, after his initial conviction, Conrad released another song and video "Doux pays" (Sweet Country). The lyrics include "Je baise la France jusqu'à l'agonie" ("I fuck France to the point of agony"), while the video portrays him strangling a white woman to death. The minister of the interior, Christophe Castaner, called for prosecution and for the removal of the video. According to Conrad, the video is a work of fiction about "strangling the French mentality".

AGRIF called for Conrad to be prosecuted for this second video. He was acquitted in June 2021, with an appeal set for the following February.
