= Ronald Chisom =

Author, civil rights activist, community organizer, medical researcher, and co-founder

- Born: 1941 (age 84–85); New Orleans, Louisiana, United States
- Known for: Chisom V. Roemer case Co-founding People's Institute for Survival and Beyond
- Scientific career
- Fields: Medical researcher
- Workplaces: Louisiana State University Medical School

Ronald Chisom is an African American author, civil rights activist and community organizer who was involved in fighting for justice and equality for marginalized communities in the United States. He is a co-founder of People's Institute for Survival and Beyond. and a former medical researcher at Louisiana State University Medical School.

== Early and personal life ==
Born in 1941 in New Orleans, Louisiana, Chisom grew up in a segregated society that was affected by racism and discrimination.

Chisom is married to Jerolie Encalade Chisom, with whom he has one daughter, Tiphanie Chisom-Eugene.

== The People's Institute for Survival and Beyond ==
Chisom was involved in the civil rights movement in the 1960s, working alongside leaders such as Saul Alinsky to advance the cause of racial justice. In 1980, Chisom and Dr. Jim Dunn co-founded the People's Institute for Survival and Beyond (PISAB), an organization that pursued anti-racism education and community organizing. The organization held trainings and workshops in communities, churches and schools.

== Chisom v. Roemer ==
In 1986, Chisom filed a case to challenge the at-large voting system used in Louisiana's 4th congressional district against Louisiana Governor Buddy Roemer, the Louisiana secretary of state, and other state officials. In the case, Chisom argued that the at-large voting system violated the Voting Rights Act of 1965, which prohibited voting practices that discriminate based on race.

The US District Court for the Western District of Louisiana ruled in favor of Chisom, finding that the at-large voting system had a discriminatory effect on African American voters and violated the Voting Rights Act. The court ordered that the 4th congressional district be redrawn with single-member districts to provide better representation for African American voters.

In 1991, the case was appealed to the U.S. Supreme Court, which reversed the district court's ruling. The Supreme Court held that the plaintiffs had not met their burden of proof in showing that the at-large voting system was intentionally discriminatory.

Following the ruling, the federal court adopted the Chisom Consent Decree of 1992 to allow Black voters in the state to have an equal opportunity to elect candidates of their choice to the Louisiana Supreme Court. In 2022, Louisiana's attorney general moved a motion to dissolve the Chisom Consent Decree.

== Awards and honors ==
- The 2013 Human Services Anti-Racism Award
- Senior fellow at Ashoka's Global Academy
- The Bannerman Fellowship
- The Petra Foundation Award
- The Pax Christi Bread & Roses award
- The Tenant Resource Center Achievement Award
- Thomas Merton Award in 1997
- 2025 honorary doctorate of Public Service from the University of Maryland, Baltimore School of Social Work

== Publications ==
- Undoing Racism: A Philosophy of International Social Change · Volume 1 (1997)
- Undoing Racism: An International Philosophy of Social Change by the People's Institute for Survival and Beyond (1996)
