= Injury (law) =

Legal term

As a legal term, injury is a harm done to a person due to acts or omissions of other persons. Harm may be of various kinds: bodily injury, psychological trauma, loss of property or reputation, breach of contract, etc. Injury may give rise to civil tort or criminal prosecution. Law recognizes certain categories of injury, such as personal injury vs. injury to property, permanent injury, irreparable injury, potential injury, continuing injury, etc.

== See also ==
- Malice
- Wrongdoing
