= People's Institute for Survival and Beyond =

Non-profit organization

People's Institute for Survival and Beyond (PISAB)
- Abbreviation: PISAB
- Formation: 1980
- Founder: Ronald Chisom and James Norman Dunn
- Purpose: Addressing racism, poverty and social injustices
- Headquarters: New Orleans, Louisiana
- Location: United States
- Website: pisab.org

The People's Institute for Survival and Beyond (PISAB) is an American non-profit organization that provides education and training to individuals, communities and organizations on issues related to systemic racism and social and human justice. It was founded in 1980 by civil and human rights activists and scholars Ronald Chisom and James Norman Dunn. It is based in New Orleans, Louisiana with several regional organizing hubs across the country. More than two million people completed PISAB's Undoing Racism and Community Organizing workshops.

== Programs and initiatives ==
=== Undoing Racism ===
The People's Institute for Survival and Beyond offers an Undoing Racism workshop that seeks to increase people's understanding of systemic and institutionalized racism in our society. The program uses a multi-dimensional approach that incorporates historical analysis, group participation, and community organizing strategies. Participants in the workshops engage in dialogue and discussions that are designed to support critical thinking, challenge their assumptions about race, privilege, and power. The workshop is designed to be accessible to a broad range of individuals, organizers and organizations, including community groups, non-profits, government agencies, and businesses. It has been implemented in a variety of settings, including schools, neighborhood associations, hospitals, and social and service agencies.

The workshops have been in different research studies that in some cases, required the participants to attend PISAB's Undoing Racism workshops;

| Article published | Publishing Journal | Year of publishing | Relationship with PISAB |
|---|---|---|---|
| Antiracism Expanding Social Work Education: A Qualitative Analysis of the Undoing Racism Workshop Experience | Journal of Social Work Education | 2018 | The study evaluated how student participants felt after attending the Undoing racism workshop. |
| Participatory and Action Research Within and Beyond the academy: Contesting Racism through Decolonial Praxis and Teaching "Against the Grain" | American Journal of Community Psychology | 2018 | The participants attended a two and half days Undoing racism work that was organized by PISAB prior to taking the survey. |
| The Art and Science of Integrating Undoing Racism with CBPR: Challenges of Pursuing NIH Funding to Investigate Cancer Care and Racial Equity | Journal of Urban Health | 2006 | The study explored how the principles of community participatory studies can be integrated with the processes of undoing racism program. |

=== People's Institute Youth Agenda ===
An initiative of PISAB through which young people and community organizers committed to understanding the current issues that face society come together to positively contribute to their communities and are educated and recruited to reach other young people who organize was started in 1996 by an intergenerational group of veteran organizers and young activists, tailored to those aged 12 to 18.

=== European Dissent ===
This is an initiative that is specifically designed for individuals of European descent who are interested in working towards racial justice and equity. This anti-racism organizing collective seeks to address the ways in which white privilege and racism operate in our society, to strengthen the number of white people organizing for racial justice, and to empower participants to take action to dismantle racism.
