= List of members of the National Assembly (South Korea), 1985–1988 =

The members of the twelfth National Assembly of South Korea were elected on 12 February 1985. The Assembly sat from 11 April 1985 until 29 May 1988. Their four-year term was officially supposed to be over on 10 April 1989, but the Constitution of the Sixth Republic of South Korea shortened their terms.

== Members ==
Province/City	Constituency	Member	Party	
Province/City	Constituency	Member	At election	At term's end
Seoul	Jongno–Jung	Lee Jong-chan	DJP	DJP
Seoul	Jongno–Jung	Lee Min-woo (Note: Lee Min-woo resigned on 20 November 1987.)	NKDP	NKDP
Seoul	Mapo–Yongsan	Noh Sung-hwan	NKDP	PDP
Seoul	Mapo–Yongsan	Pong Du-wan	DJP	DJP
Seoul	Seongdong	Lee Sei-kee	DJP	DJP
Seoul	Seongdong	Park Yong-man	NKDP	RDP
Seoul	Dongdaemun	Song Won-yong	NKDP	RDP
Seoul	Dongdaemun	Kwon Young-woo	DJP	DJP
Seoul	Seongbuk	Lee Chul	NKDP	Independent
Seoul	Seongbuk	Kim Chung-rye	DJP	DJP
Seoul	Dobong	Chough Soon-hyung	NKDP	HDP
Seoul	Dobong	Hong Sung-woo	DJP	DJP
Seoul	Seodaemun–Eunpyeong	Kim Jae-kwang	NKDP	RDP
Seoul	Seodaemun–Eunpyeong	Yoon Giel-joong	DJP	DJP
Seoul	Gangseo	Kim Yung-bae	NKDP	PDP
Seoul	Gangseo	Nam Jae-hee	DJP	DJP
Seoul	Guro	Cho Youn-ha	NKDP	RDP
Seoul	Guro	Kim Ki-bae	DJP	DJP
Seoul	Yeongdeungpo	Park Han-sang	NKDP	Independent
Seoul	Yeongdeungpo	Lee Chan-hyuk	DJP	DJP
Seoul	Dongjak	Park Sil	NKDP	PDP
Seoul	Dongjak	Huh Chung-ill	DJP	DJP
Seoul	Gwanak	Kim Soo-han	NKDP	RDP
Seoul	Gwanak	Yim Churl-soon (Note: Yim Churl-soon died on 24 August 1987.)	DJP	DJP
Seoul	Gangnam	Kim Hyung-rhae	NKDP	RDP
Seoul	Gangnam	Lee Choong-jae	DKP	PDP
Seoul	Gangdong	Kim Dong-kyu	NKDP	RDP
Seoul	Gangdong	Chung Nam	DJP	DJP
Busan	Jung–Dong–Yeongdo	Kim Jung-kil	DKP	RDP
Busan	Jung–Dong–Yeongdo	Park Chan-jong	NKDP	Independent
Busan	Seo–Saha	Seo Seok-jai	NKDP	RDP
Busan	Seo–Saha	Kwak Jung-chul	DJP	DJP
Busan	Busanjin	Kang Kyung-sik	KNP	NDRP
Busan	Busanjin	Kim Jeung-soo	NKDP	RDP
Busan	Dongnae	Lee Geon-il	DKP	NDRP
Busan	Dongnae	Park Kwan-yong	NKDP	RDP
Busan	Nam–Haeundae	Lee Ki-taek	NKDP	RDP
Busan	Nam–Haeundae	Yoo Heung-soo	DJP	DJP
Busan	Buk	Chang Sung-man	DJP	DJP
Busan	Buk	Moon Jung-soo	NKDP	RDP
Daegu	Jung–Seo	Yoo Sung-hwan	NKDP	RDP
Daegu	Jung–Seo	Lee Man-sup	KNP	Independent
Daegu	Dong–Buk	Kim Yong-tae	DJP	DJP
Daegu	Dong–Buk	Mok Yo-sang	DKP	RDP
Daegu	Nam–Suseong	Rhee Chi-ho	DJP	DJP
Daegu	Nam–Suseong	Shin Do-hwan	NKDP	Independent
Incheon	Jung–Nam	Shim Chung-ku	DJP	DJP
Incheon	Jung–Nam	Myeong Hwa-sub	NKDP	RDP
Incheon	Dong–Buk	Yoo Jei-yeun	NKDP	RDP
Incheon	Dong–Buk	Kim Sook-hyun	DJP	DJP
Gyeonggi Province	Suwon–Hwaseong	Lee Byung-jick	DJP	DJP
Gyeonggi Province	Suwon–Hwaseong	Park Wang-sik	NKDP	RDP
Gyeonggi Province	Seongnam–Gwangju	Lee Dae-yub	KNP	NDRP
Gyeonggi Province	Seongnam–Gwangju	Oh Se-eung	DJP	DJP
Gyeonggi Province	Uijeongbu–Dongducheon–Yangju	Kim Heung-kwang	NKDP	RDP
Gyeonggi Province	Uijeongbu–Dongducheon–Yangju	Hong Woo-joon	DJP	DJP
Gyeonggi Province	Anyang–Gwangmyeong–Siheung–Ongjin	Lee Taek-don	NKDP	Independent
Gyeonggi Province	Anyang–Gwangmyeong–Siheung–Ongjin	Yoon Kook-ro (Note: Yoon Kook-ro died on 9 December 1986.)	DJP	DJP
Gyeonggi Province	Bucheon–Gimpo–Ganghwa	An Dong-seon	NKDP	PDP
Gyeonggi Province	Bucheon–Gimpo–Ganghwa	Park Kyu-sik	DJP	Independent
Gyeonggi Province	Namyangju–Yangpyeong	Kim Young-sun	DJP	DJP
Gyeonggi Province	Namyangju–Yangpyeong	Jo Byeong-bong	KNP	RDP
Gyeonggi Province	Yeoju–Icheon–Yongin	Jong Dong-song	DJP	DJP
Gyeonggi Province	Yeoju–Icheon–Yongin	Cho Jong-ik	DKP	RDP
Gyeonggi Province	Songtan–Pyeongtaek–Anseong	Lee Ja-hon	DJP	DJP
Gyeonggi Province	Songtan–Pyeongtaek–Anseong	Yoo Chi-song	DKP	Independent
Gyeonggi Province	Paju–Goyang	Lee Yong-ho	DJP	DJP
Gyeonggi Province	Paju–Goyang	Lee Young-joon	DKP	RDP
Gyeonggi Province	Yeoncheon–Pocheon–Gapyeong	Lee Han-dong	DJP	DJP
Gyeonggi Province	Yeoncheon–Pocheon–Gapyeong	Kim Yong-chae	KNP	NDRP
Gangwon Province	Chuncheon–Chunseong–Cheolwon–Hwacheon	Lee Min-sup	DJP	DJP
Gangwon Province	Chuncheon–Chunseong–Cheolwon–Hwacheon	Sin Chul-gyn	KNP	NDRP
Gangwon Province	Wonju–Wonseong–Hongcheon–Hoengseong	Kim Yong-dai	DJP	DJP
Gangwon Province	Wonju–Wonseong–Hongcheon–Hoengseong	Hahm Jong-han	KNP	DJP
Gangwon Province	Donghae–Taebaek–Samcheok	Kim Jung-nam	DJP	DJP
Gangwon Province	Donghae–Taebaek–Samcheok	Kim Hyo-yung	Independent	NDRP
Gangwon Province	Gangneung–Myeongju–Yangyang	Rhee Bomb-June	DJP	DJP
Gangwon Province	Gangneung–Myeongju–Yangyang	Lee Bong-mo	KNP	DJP
Gangwon Province	Sokcho–Yanggu–Inje–Goseong	Chung Jae-chull	DJP	DJP
Gangwon Province	Sokcho–Yanggu–Inje–Goseong	Heo Gyeong-gu	DKP	Independent
Gangwon Province	Yeongwol–Pyeongchang–Jeongseon	Shim Myung-boo	DJP	DJP
Gangwon Province	Yeongwol–Pyeongchang–Jeongseon	Shin Min-sun	KNP	DJP
North Chungcheong Province	Cheongju–Cheongwon	Chung Chong-teck	DJP	DJP
North Chungcheong Province	Cheongju–Cheongwon	Kim Hyun-soo	NKDP	RDP
North Chungcheong Province	Chungju–Jecheon–Jungwon–Jewon–Danyang	Lee Choon-koo	DJP	DJP
North Chungcheong Province	Chungju–Jecheon–Jungwon–Jewon–Danyang	Lee Taeck-hy	NKDP	Independent
North Chungcheong Province	Boeun–Okcheon–Yeongdong	Park Jun-byung	DJP	DJP
North Chungcheong Province	Boeun–Okcheon–Yeongdong	Lee Yong-hee	DKP	PDP
North Chungcheong Province	Jincheon–Gwisan–Eumseong	Kim Chong-hoh	DJP	DJP
North Chungcheong Province	Jincheon–Gwisan–Eumseong	Kim Wan-tae	KNP	DJP
South Chungcheong Province	Dong, Daejeon	Song Chun-young	NKDP	RDP
South Chungcheong Province	Dong, Daejeon	Nam Jae-du	DJP	DJP
South Chungcheong Province	Jung, Daejeon	Kang Chang-hee	DJP	DJP
South Chungcheong Province	Jung, Daejeon	Kim Tae-ryong	NKDP	RDP
South Chungcheong Province	Cheonan–Cheonwon–Asan	Chung Sun-ho	DJP	DJP
South Chungcheong Province	Cheonan–Cheonwon–Asan	Chung Jae-won	DKP	Independent
South Chungcheong Province	Geumsan–Daedeok–Yeongi	Cheon Yeong-seong	DJP	DJP
South Chungcheong Province	Geumsan–Daedeok–Yeongi	Yoo Han-yul	DKP	Independent
South Chungcheong Province	Nonsan–Gongju	Chung Suk-mo	DJP	DJP
South Chungcheong Province	Nonsan–Gongju	Kim Han-soo	NKDP	RDP
South Chungcheong Province	Buyeo–Seocheon–Boryeong	Lee Sang-ik	DJP	DJP
South Chungcheong Province	Buyeo–Seocheon–Boryeong	Kim Ok-sun	NKDP	Independent
South Chungcheong Province	Cheongyang–Hongseong–Yesan	Choi Chang-kyu	DJP	DJP
South Chungcheong Province	Cheongyang–Hongseong–Yesan	Kim Sung-sik	DKP	RDP
South Chungcheong Province	Seosan–Dangjin	Kim Hyun-uk	DJP	DJP
South Chungcheong Province	Seosan–Dangjin	Jang Ki-uk	DKP	Independent
North Jeolla Province	Jeonju–Wanju	Yi Cheol-seung	NKDP	Independent
North Jeolla Province	Jeonju–Wanju	Lim Bang-hyun	DJP	DJP
North Jeolla Province	Gunsan–Okgu	Goh Kun	DJP	DJP
North Jeolla Province	Gunsan–Okgu	Kim Bong-wook	DKP	PDP
North Jeolla Province	Iri–Iksan	Kim Deuk-soo	KNP	PDP
North Jeolla Province	Iri–Iksan	Cho Nam-jo	DJP	DJP
North Jeolla Province	Jinan–Muju–Jangsu	Jeon Byeong-woo	DJP	DJP
North Jeolla Province	Jinan–Muju–Jangsu	Kim Kwang-soo	KNP	DJP
North Jeolla Province	Namwon City–Imsil–Namwon County–Sunchang	Yang Chang-sik	DJP	DJP
North Jeolla Province	Namwon City–Imsil–Namwon County–Sunchang	Choi Yong-an	KNP	Independent
North Jeolla Province	Jeongju–Jeongeup–Gochang	Jun Jong-chun	DJP	DJP
North Jeolla Province	Jeongju–Jeongeup–Gochang	Yoo Kab-chong	NDP	Independent
North Jeolla Province	Buan–Gimje	Choi Rak-do	NKDP	PDP
North Jeolla Province	Buan–Gimje	Cho Sang-rae	DJP	DJP
South Jeolla Province	Dong–Buk, Gwangju	Shin Ki-ha	NKDP	PDP
South Jeolla Province	Dong–Buk, Gwangju	Koh Kwi-nam	DJP	DJP
South Jeolla Province	Seo, Gwangju	Kim Nok-yeong (Note: Kim Nok-yeong died on 10 July 1985.)	NKDP	NKDP
South Jeolla Province	Seo, Gwangju	Lee Young-il	DJP	DJP
South Jeolla Province	Mokpo–Muan–Sinan	Choi Young-choul	DJP	DJP
South Jeolla Province	Mokpo–Muan–Sinan	Im Jong-ki	DKP	Independent
South Jeolla Province	Yeosu–Yeocheon–Gwangyang	Kim Chai-ho	DJP	DJP
South Jeolla Province	Yeosu–Yeocheon–Gwangyang	Shin Soon-beom	NKDP	PDP
South Jeolla Province	Suncheon–Gurye–Seungju	You Kyung-hyun	DJP	DJP
South Jeolla Province	Suncheon–Gurye–Seungju	Huh Kyung-man	NKDP	PDP
South Jeolla Province	Geumseong–Gwangsan–Naju	Na Sok-ho	DJP	DJP
South Jeolla Province	Geumseong–Gwangsan–Naju	Lee Jai-keun	DKP	PDP
South Jeolla Province	Damyang–Gokseong–Hwasun	Koo Yong-sang	DJP	DJP
South Jeolla Province	Damyang–Gokseong–Hwasun	Koh Jae-chung	DKP	Independent
South Jeolla Province	Goheung–Boseong	Lee Dai-soon	DJP	DJP
South Jeolla Province	Goheung–Boseong	Yoo Joon-sang	DKP	PDP
South Jeolla Province	Jangheung–Gangjin–Yeongam–Wando	Kim Sik	DJP	DJP
South Jeolla Province	Jangheung–Gangjin–Yeongam–Wando	Lee Young-kwon	NKDP	PDP
South Jeolla Province	Haenam–Jindo	Jeong Si-chae	DJP	DJP
South Jeolla Province	Haenam–Jindo	Kim Bong-ho	NPSP	PDP
South Jeolla Province	Yeonggwang–Hampyeong–Jangseong	Cho Ki-sang	DJP	DJP
South Jeolla Province	Yeonggwang–Hampyeong–Jangseong	Lee Jin-yon	DKP	PDP
North Gyeongsang Province	Pohang–Yeongil–Ulleung	Park Kyung-suk	DJP	DJP
North Gyeongsang Province	Pohang–Yeongil–Ulleung	Seu Jong-yeul	DKP	Independent
North Gyeongsang Province	Gyeongju–Wolseong–Cheongdo	Park Kwon-hoem	DJP	DJP
North Gyeongsang Province	Gyeongju–Wolseong–Cheongdo	Kim Il-yun	DKP	DJP
North Gyeongsang Province	Gimcheon–Geumneung–Sangju	Kim Sang-koo	DJP	DJP
North Gyeongsang Province	Gimcheon–Geumneung–Sangju	Lee Jae-ok	NKDP	RDP
North Gyeongsang Province	Andong City–Andong County–Uiseong	Kwon Jong-dal	DJP	DJP
North Gyeongsang Province	Andong City–Andong County–Uiseong	Kim Young-saeng	KNP	DJP
North Gyeongsang Province	Gumi–Gunwi–Seonsan–Chilgok	Park Jae-hong	DJP	DJP
North Gyeongsang Province	Gumi–Gunwi–Seonsan–Chilgok	Kim Hyun-kyiu	Independent	RDP
North Gyeongsang Province	Yeongju–Yeongpung–Yeongyang–Bonghwa	Oh Han-koo	DJP	DJP
North Gyeongsang Province	Yeongju–Yeongpung–Yeongyang–Bonghwa	Hong Sa-duk	NKDP	Independent
North Gyeongsang Province	Dalseong–Goryeong–Seongju	Kim Jong-ki	DJP	DJP
North Gyeongsang Province	Dalseong–Goryeong–Seongju	Lee Yong-taek	Independent	DJP
North Gyeongsang Province	Yeongdeok–Cheongsong–Uljin	Kim Joong-kwon	DJP	DJP
North Gyeongsang Province	Yeongdeok–Cheongsong–Uljin	Hwang Byung-woo	DKP	DJP
North Gyeongsang Province	Yeongcheon City–Yeongcheon County–Gyeongsan	Yum Kil-jung	DJP	DJP
North Gyeongsang Province	Yeongcheon City–Yeongcheon County–Gyeongsan	Kwon Oh-tae	NKDP	RDP
North Gyeongsang Province	Mungyeong–Yecheon	Chae Mun-shick	DJP	DJP
North Gyeongsang Province	Mungyeong–Yecheon	Ban Hyung-sik	NKDP	RDP
South Gyeongsang Province	Masan	Kang Sam-jae	NKDP	RDP
South Gyeongsang Province	Masan	Woo Byung-kyu	DJP	DJP
South Gyeongsang Province	Ulsan–Ulju	Kim Tae-ho	DJP	DJP
South Gyeongsang Province	Ulsan–Ulju	Shim Wan-gu	DKP	RDP
South Gyeongsang Province	Jinju–Samcheonpo–Jinyang–Sacheon	Ann Byung-kyu	DJP	DJP
South Gyeongsang Province	Jinju–Samcheonpo–Jinyang–Sacheon	Lee Sang-min	DKP	RDP
South Gyeongsang Province	Cheongwon–Jinhae–Uichang	Bae Myung-gook	DJP	DJP
South Gyeongsang Province	Cheongwon–Jinhae–Uichang	Hwang Nak-joo	DKP	RDP
South Gyeongsang Province	Chungmu–Tongyeong–Geoje–Goseong	Chung Soon-duk	DJP	DJP
South Gyeongsang Province	Chungmu–Tongyeong–Geoje–Goseong	Kim Bong-jo	NKDP	RDP
South Gyeongsang Province	Uiryeong–Haman–Hapcheon	Yu Sang-ho	DJP	DJP
South Gyeongsang Province	Uiryeong–Haman–Hapcheon	Cho Hong-rae	NKDP	RDP
South Gyeongsang Province	Milyang–Changnyeong	Shin Sang-sik	DJP	DJP
South Gyeongsang Province	Milyang–Changnyeong	Park Il	DKP	RDP
South Gyeongsang Province	Gimhae City–Gimhae County–Yangsan	Lee Jae-woo	DJP	DJP
South Gyeongsang Province	Gimhae City–Gimhae County–Yangsan	Kim Dong-joo	NKDP	RDP
South Gyeongsang Province	Namhae–Hadong	Park Ik-joo	DJP	DJP
South Gyeongsang Province	Namhae–Hadong	Choi Chi-whan (Note: Choi Chi-whan died on 27 May 1987.)	KNP	KNP
South Gyeongsang Province	Sancheong–Hamyang–Geochang	Kwon Ik-hyun	DJP	DJP
South Gyeongsang Province	Sancheong–Hamyang–Geochang	Kim Dong-yong	NKDP	RDP
Jeju Province	Jeju–Bukjeju–Namjeju	Hyun Kyung-dae	DJP	DJP
Jeju Province	Jeju–Bukjeju–Namjeju	Yang Jung-kyu	Independent	DJP
National	Proportional representation	Lee Chai-hyung	DJP	DJP
National	Proportional representation	Chin Iee-chong	DJP	DJP
National	Proportional representation	Roh Tae-woo (Note: Roh Tae-woo resigned on 20 December 1987, upon being elected as President of South Korea.)	DJP	DJP
National	Proportional representation	Wang Sang-eun	DJP	DJP
National	Proportional representation	Yoo Hak-seong	DJP	DJP
National	Proportional representation	Lee Sang-jae	DJP	DJP
National	Proportional representation	Suh Chung-hwa	DJP	DJP
National	Proportional representation	Park Johng-moon	DJP	DJP
National	Proportional representation	Kang Kyong-shik	DJP	DJP
National	Proportional representation	Hwang In-sung (Note: Hwang In-sung resigned on 1 August 1985, upon being appointed as Minister of Agriculture.)	DJP	DJP
National	Proportional representation	Park Dong-jin (Note: Park Dong-jin resigned on 11 May 1988, upon being appointed as ambassador of South Korea to the United States.)	DJP	DJP
National	Proportional representation	Lee Yong-hoon	DJP	DJP
National	Proportional representation	Rha Woong-bae (Note: Rha Woong-bae resigned on 13 July 1987, upon being appointed as Minister of Commerce and Industry.)	DJP	DJP
National	Proportional representation	Cho Il-mun	DJP	DJP
National	Proportional representation	Kwon Joong-dong	DJP	DJP
National	Proportional representation	Lee Seong-ryul	DJP	DJP
National	Proportional representation	Kim Hyun-ja	DJP	DJP
National	Proportional representation	Bae Seong-tong	DJP	DJP
National	Proportional representation	Hyun Hong-choo	DJP	DJP
National	Proportional representation	Lee Young-wook	DJP	DJP
National	Proportional representation	Kim Young-jak (Note: Kim Young-jak resigned on 17 September 1985.)	DJP	Independent
National	Proportional representation	Cho Sang-hyun	DJP	DJP
National	Proportional representation	Kim Yung-chung	DJP	DJP
National	Proportional representation	Ahn Kap-jun	DJP	DJP
National	Proportional representation	Kim Sung-ky (Note: Kim Sung-ky resigned on 1 August 1985, upon being appointed as Minister of Justice.)	DJP	DJP
National	Proportional representation	Cho Chong-ho	DJP	DJP
National	Proportional representation	Rhee Shang-hi	DJP	DJP
National	Proportional representation	Ryu Geun-hwan	DJP	DJP
National	Proportional representation	Han Yang-soon	DJP	DJP
National	Proportional representation	Hong Jong-wook	DJP	DJP
National	Proportional representation	Chung Chang-wha	DJP	DJP
National	Proportional representation	Kim Chong-in	DJP	DJP
National	Proportional representation	Kim Yung-koo	DJP	DJP
National	Proportional representation	Choe Byung-yul	DJP	DJP
National	Proportional representation	Kang Yong-sik	DJP	DJP
National	Proportional representation	Song Yong-sik	DJP	DJP
National	Proportional representation	Chi Youn-tai	DJP	DJP
National	Proportional representation	Im Du-bin	DJP	DJP
National	Proportional representation	Chung Hyun-kyung	DJP	DJP
National	Proportional representation	Chin Chi-pom	DJP	DJP
National	Proportional representation	Choi Young-duk	DJP	DJP
National	Proportional representation	Im Yeong-deuk	DJP	Independent
National	Proportional representation	Kim Jip	DJP	DJP
National	Proportional representation	Chi Kap-chong	DJP	DJP
National	Proportional representation	Choi Myun-hun	DJP	DJP
National	Proportional representation	Lee Jong-ryool (Note: Lee Jong-ryool resigned on 3 September 1986, upon being appointed as Chief Presidential Secretary for Public Affairs.)	DJP	DJP
National	Proportional representation	Cho Kyung-mok	DJP	DJP
National	Proportional representation	Kim Hyung-hio	DJP	DJP
National	Proportional representation	Kim Hak-joon (Note: Kim Hak-joon resigned on 29 March 1988.)	DJP	DJP
National	Proportional representation	Suh Jung-hwa	DJP	DJP
National	Proportional representation	Kim Duoo-jong	DJP	DJP
National	Proportional representation	Yang Kyung-ja	DJP	DJP
National	Proportional representation	Moon Hi-gab (Note: Moon Hi-gab resigned on 1 August 1985, upon being appointed as director of the Economic Planning Board.)	DJP	DJP
National	Proportional representation	Kim Yang-bae (Note: Kim Yang-bae resigned on 13 October 1986, upon being appointed as Mayor of Gwangju.)	DJP	DJP
National	Proportional representation	Chung Hui-dong	DJP	Independent
National	Proportional representation	Kim Jang-sook	DJP	DJP
National	Proportional representation	Park He-kyong (Note: Park He-kyong resigned on 19 September 1985.)	DJP	DJP
National	Proportional representation	Lee Choul-woo	DJP	DJP
National	Proportional representation	Ahn Young-wha	DJP	DJP
National	Proportional representation	Choi Sang-jin	DJP	DJP
National	Proportional representation	Lee Sung-ho	DJP	DJP
National	Proportional representation	Lee Jin (Note: Lee Jin took office on 1 August 1985, to succeed Hwang In-sung.)	DJP	DJP
National	Proportional representation	Chung Ho-keun (Note: Chung Ho-keun took office on 1 August 1985, to succeed Kim Sung-ky.)	DJP	DJP
National	Proportional representation	Kim Zoong-wie (Note: Kim Zoong-wie took office on 1 August 1985, to succeed Moon Hi-gab.)	DJP	DJP
National	Proportional representation	Park Sung-tae (Note: Park Sung-tae took office on 17 September 1985, to succeed Kim Young-jak.)	DJP	DJP
National	Proportional representation	Kim Chung-giun (Note: Kim Chung-giun took office on 19 September 1985, to succeed Park He-kyong.)	DJP	DJP
National	Proportional representation	Kim Tae-soo (Note: Kim Tae-soo took office on 3 September 1986, to succeed Lee Jong-ryool.)	DJP	DJP
National	Proportional representation	Hong Hee-pyo (Note: Hong Hee-pyo took office on 13 October 1986, to succeed Kim Yang-bae.)	DJP	Independent
National	Proportional representation	Kim Moon-kee (Note: Kim Moon-kee took office on 13 July 1987, to succeed Rha Woong-bae.)	DJP	DJP
National	Proportional representation	Chung Dong-yun (Note: Chung Dong-yun took office on 20 December 1987, to succeed Roh Tae-woo.)	DJP	DJP
National	Proportional representation	Sim Guk-mu (Note: Sim Guk-mu took office on 29 March 1988, to succeed Kim Hak-joon.)	DJP	DJP
National	Proportional representation	Kim Jong-yeul (Note: Kim Jong-yeul took office on 11 May 1988, to succeed Park Dong-jin.)	DJP	DJP
National	Proportional representation	Shin Dal-soo	NKDP	DJP
National	Proportional representation	Lim Choon-won	NKDP	PDP
National	Proportional representation	Ko Han-joon	NKDP	PDP
National	Proportional representation	Kim Hyung-kyung	NKDP	RDP
National	Proportional representation	Chung Jey-moon	NKDP	RDP
National	Proportional representation	Han Seok-bong	NKDP	RDP
National	Proportional representation	Yun Young-tak	NKDP	RDP
National	Proportional representation	Shin Byung-lyul	NKDP	RDP
National	Proportional representation	Park Jong-yull	NKDP	RDP
National	Proportional representation	Cho Young-soo	NKDP	RDP
National	Proportional representation	Kim Byung-soo	NKDP	Independent
National	Proportional representation	Kim Dong-wook	NKDP	RDP
National	Proportional representation	Lee Kil-bum	NKDP	PDP
National	Proportional representation	Kim Yong-oh	NKDP	PDP
National	Proportional representation	Jang Chung-jun	NKDP	PDP
National	Proportional representation	Choi Fun	NKDP	PDP
National	Proportional representation	Shin Kyung-sul	NKDP	DJP
National	Proportional representation	Lee Tae-gu	DKP	Independent
National	Proportional representation	Park Hae-chung	DKP	Independent
National	Proportional representation	Sin Jae-hyu	DKP	Independent
National	Proportional representation	Son Tai-gon	DKP	DJP
National	Proportional representation	Chung Sang-koo	DKP	RDP
National	Proportional representation	Choi Woon-ji	DKP	DJP
National	Proportional representation	Shin Dong-jun	DKP	Independent
National	Proportional representation	Hwang Dae-bong	DKP	RDP
National	Proportional representation	Song Hyun-sup	DKP	PDP
National	Proportional representation	Kim Chong-chul (Note: Kim Chong-chul died on 14 November 1986.)	KNP	KNP
National	Proportional representation	Chung Si-bong	KNP	NDRP
National	Proportional representation	Moon Byung-ha	KNP	Independent
National	Proportional representation	Kim Kyu-won	KNP	NDRP
National	Proportional representation	Choi Jae-ku	KNP	NDRP
National	Proportional representation	Cho Yong-jik (Note: Cho Yong-jik took office on 14 November 1986, to succeed Kim Chong-chul.)	KNP	NDRP
