= List of members of the National Assembly (South Korea), 1981–1985 =

The members of the eleventh National Assembly of South Korea were elected on 25 March 1981. The Assembly sat from 11 April 1981 until 10 April 1985.

== Members ==
Province/City	Constituency	Member	Party	
Province/City	Constituency	Member	At election	At term's end
Seoul	Jongno–Jung	Lee Jong-chan	DJP	DJP
Seoul	Jongno–Jung	Kim Pan-sul	DKP	DKP
Seoul	Mapo–Yongsan	Pong Du-wan	DJP	DJP
Seoul	Mapo–Yongsan	Kim Jae-yeong	DKP	DKP
Seoul	Seongdong	Lee Sei-kee	DJP	DJP
Seoul	Seongdong	Cho Duk-hyun	KNP	KNP
Seoul	Dongdaemun	Kwon Young-woo	DJP	DJP
Seoul	Dongdaemun	Sim Heon-seop	DKP	DKP
Seoul	Seongbuk	Kim Chung-rye	DJP	DJP
Seoul	Seongbuk	Chough Soon-hyung	Independent	NKDP
Seoul	Dobong	Hong Sung-woo	DJP	DJP
Seoul	Dobong	Kim Tae-su	DKP	DKP
Seoul	Seodaemun–Eunpyeong	Sonn Se-il	DKP	DKP
Seoul	Seodaemun–Eunpyeong	Yoon Giel-joong	DJP	DJP
Seoul	Gangseo	Nam Jae-hee	DJP	DJP
Seoul	Gangseo	Go Byeong-hyeon	DKP	DKP
Seoul	Guro	Chou Myun-hun	DJP	DJP
Seoul	Guro	Kim Byung-o	DKP	DKP
Seoul	Yeongdeungpo	Lee Chan-hyuk	DJP	DJP
Seoul	Yeongdeungpo	Lee Won-bum	DKP	DKP
Seoul	Dongjak	Suh Chung-won	DKP	DKP
Seoul	Dongjak	Cho Chong-ho	DJP	DJP
Seoul	Gwanak	Yim Churl-soon	DJP	DJP
Seoul	Gwanak	Han Gwang-ok	DKP	DKP
Seoul	Gangnam	Lee Tae-sup	DJP	DJP
Seoul	Gangnam	Go Jeong-hun	DSP	NPSP
Seoul	Gangdong	Chung Nam	DJP	DJP
Seoul	Gangdong	Jeong Jil-gil	DKP	DKP
Busan	Jung–Dong–Yeongdo	Wang Sang-eun	DJP	DJP
Busan	Jung–Dong–Yeongdo	An Geon-il	DKP	DKP
Busan	Seo	Seo Seok-jai	DKP	NKDP
Busan	Seo	Kwak Jung-chul	DJP	DJP
Busan	Busanjin	Gu Yong-hyeon	DJP	DJP
Busan	Busanjin	Kim Jeung-soo	CRP	NKDP
Busan	Dongnae	Kim Jin-jae	DJP	DJP
Busan	Dongnae	Park Kwan-yong	DKP	NKDP
Busan	Nam–Haeundae	Lee Heung-su	DJP	DJP
Busan	Nam–Haeundae	Kim Seung-mok	DKP	DKP
Busan	Buk	Chang Sung-man	DJP	DJP
Busan	Buk	Shin Sang-woo	DKP	DKP
Gyeonggi Province	Jung–Nam, Incheon	Maeng Eun-jae	DJP	DJP
Gyeonggi Province	Jung–Nam, Incheon	Kim Eun-ha	DKP	DKP
Gyeonggi Province	Dong–Buk, Incheon	Kim Sook-hyun	DJP	DJP
Gyeonggi Province	Dong–Buk, Incheon	Chung Jung-hoon	DKP	DKP
Gyeonggi Province	Suwon–Hwaseong	Lee Byung-jick	DJP	DJP
Gyeonggi Province	Suwon–Hwaseong	Yu Yong-geun	DKP	DKP
Gyeonggi Province	Seongnam–Gwangju	Oh Se-eung	DJP	DJP
Gyeonggi Province	Seongnam–Gwangju	Lee Dae-yub	NPP	KNP
Gyeonggi Province	Uijeongbu–Yangju	Hong Woo-joon	DJP	DJP
Gyeonggi Province	Uijeongbu–Yangju	Kim Moon-won	DKP	DKP
Gyeonggi Province	Anyang–Siheung–Ongjin	Yoon Kook-ro	DJP	DJP
Gyeonggi Province	Anyang–Siheung–Ongjin	Lee Seok-yong	DKP	DKP
Gyeonggi Province	Bucheon–Gimpo–Ganghwa	Sin Neung-sun	DJP	DJP
Gyeonggi Province	Bucheon–Gimpo–Ganghwa	O Hong-seok	DKP	DKP
Gyeonggi Province	Namyangju–Yangpyeong	Kim Young-sun	DJP	DJP
Gyeonggi Province	Namyangju–Yangpyeong	Jo Byeong-bong	KNP	KNP
Gyeonggi Province	Yeoju–Icheon–Yongin	Jong Dong-song	DJP	DJP
Gyeonggi Province	Yeoju–Icheon–Yongin	Cho Jong-ik	DKP	DKP
Gyeonggi Province	Pyeongtaek–Anseong	Lee Ja-hon	DJP	DJP
Gyeonggi Province	Pyeongtaek–Anseong	Yoo Chi-song	DKP	DKP
Gyeonggi Province	Paju–Goyang	Lee Yong-ho	DJP	DJP
Gyeonggi Province	Paju–Goyang	Lee Young-joon	DKP	DKP
Gyeonggi Province	Yeoncheon–Pocheon–Gapyeong	Lee Han-dong	DJP	DJP
Gyeonggi Province	Yeoncheon–Pocheon–Gapyeong	Hong Seong-pyo	DKP	DKP
Gangwon Province	Chuncheon–Chunseong–Cheolwon–Hwacheon	Hong Jong-wook	DJP	DJP
Gangwon Province	Chuncheon–Chunseong–Cheolwon–Hwacheon	Shin Chul-gyn	KNP	KNP
Gangwon Province	Wonju–Wonseong–Hongcheon–Hoengseong	Kim Yong-dai	DJP	DJP
Gangwon Province	Wonju–Wonseong–Hongcheon–Hoengseong	Kim Byeong-yeol	DKP	DKP
Gangwon Province	Donghae–Samcheok	Kim Jung-nam	DJP	DJP
Gangwon Province	Donghae–Samcheok	Lee Gwan-hyeong	DKP	DKP
Gangwon Province	Gangneung–Myeongju–Yangyang	Rhee Bomb-june	DJP	DJP
Gangwon Province	Gangneung–Myeongju–Yangyang	Lee Bong-mo	KNP	KNP
Gangwon Province	Sokcho–Yanggu–Inje–Goseong	Chung Jae-chull	DJP	DJP
Gangwon Province	Sokcho–Yanggu–Inje–Goseong	Heo Gyeong-gu	DKP	DKP
Gangwon Province	Yeongwol–Pyeongchang–Jeongseon	Shin Myung-boo	DJP	DJP
Gangwon Province	Yeongwol–Pyeongchang–Jeongseon	Go Yeong-gu	DKP	DKP
North Chungcheong Province	Cheongju–Cheongwon	Chung Chong-teck	DJP	DJP
North Chungcheong Province	Cheongju–Cheongwon	Yun Seok-min (Note: Yun Seok-min resigned on 29 December 1984.)	KNP	KNP
North Chungcheong Province	Chungju–Jecheon–Jungwon–Jewon–Danyang	Lee Hae-won	DJP	DJP
North Chungcheong Province	Chungju–Jecheon–Jungwon–Jewon–Danyang	Kim Young-jun	DKP	DKP
North Chungcheong Province	Boeun–Okcheon–Yeongdong	Park Yu-jae	DJP	DJP
North Chungcheong Province	Boeun–Okcheon–Yeongdong	Lee Dong-jin	KNP	KNP
North Chungcheong Province	Jincheon–Gwisan–Eumseong	Ahn Kap-jun	DJP	DJP
North Chungcheong Province	Jincheon–Gwisan–Eumseong	Kim Wan-tae	KNP	KNP
South Chungcheong Province	Dong, Daejeon	Nam Jae-du	DJP	DJP
South Chungcheong Province	Dong, Daejeon	Park Wan-gyu	DKP	DKP
South Chungcheong Province	Jung, Daejeon	Lee Jae-hwan	DJP	DJP
South Chungcheong Province	Jung, Daejeon	Ryu In-beom	DKP	DKP
South Chungcheong Province	Cheonan–Cheonwon–Asan	Chung Sun-ho	DJP	DJP
South Chungcheong Province	Cheonan–Cheonwon–Asan	Hwang Myung-soo	Independent	NKDP
South Chungcheong Province	Geumsan–Daedeok–Yeongi	Cheon Yeong-seong	DJP	DJP
South Chungcheong Province	Geumsan–Daedeok–Yeongi	Yoo Han-yul	DKP	DKP
South Chungcheong Province	Nonsan–Gongju	Chung Suk-mo	DJP	DJP
South Chungcheong Province	Nonsan–Gongju	Im Deok-gyu	KNP	KNP
South Chungcheong Province	Buyeo–Seocheon–Boryeong	Lee Sang-ik	DJP	DJP
South Chungcheong Province	Buyeo–Seocheon–Boryeong	Cho Chung-youn	DKP	DKP
South Chungcheong Province	Cheongyang–Hongseong–Yesan	Lee Jong-seong	KNP	KNP
South Chungcheong Province	Cheongyang–Hongseong–Yesan	Choi Chang-kyu	DJP	DJP
South Chungcheong Province	Seosan–Dangjin	Kim Hyun-uk	DJP	DJP
South Chungcheong Province	Seosan–Dangjin	Han Young-soo (Note: Han Young-soo resigned on 30 July 1982.)	DKP	DKP
North Jeolla Province	Jeonju–Wanju	Lim Bang-hyun	DJP	DJP
North Jeolla Province	Jeonju–Wanju	Kim Tai-shik	DKP	DKP
North Jeolla Province	Gunsan–Okgu	Go Pan-nam	DJP	DJP
North Jeolla Province	Gunsan–Okgu	Kim Gil-jun	Independent	NKDP
North Jeolla Province	Iri–Iksan	Mun Byeong-yang	DJP	DJP
North Jeolla Province	Iri–Iksan	Park Byeong-il	DKP	DKP
North Jeolla Province	Jinan–Muju–Jangsu	Hwang In-sung	DJP	DJP
North Jeolla Province	Jinan–Muju–Jangsu	O Sang-hyeon	DKP	DKP
North Jeolla Province	Imsil–Namwon–Sunchang	Yang Chang-sik	DJP	DJP
North Jeolla Province	Imsil–Namwon–Sunchang	Lee Hyoung-bae	DKP	DKP
North Jeolla Province	Jeongeup–Gochang	Chin Iee-chong	DJP	DJP
North Jeolla Province	Jeongeup–Gochang	Kim Won-ki	DKP	DKP
North Jeolla Province	Buan–Gimje	Cho Sang-rae	DJP	DJP
North Jeolla Province	Buan–Gimje	Kim Jin-bae	DKP	DKP
South Jeolla Province	Dong–Buk, Gwangju	Sim Sang-u (Note: Sim Sang-u died in the Rangoon bombing on 9 October 1983.)	DJP	DJP
South Jeolla Province	Dong–Buk, Gwangju	Im Jae-jeong	DKP	Independent
South Jeolla Province	Seo, Gwangju	Ji Jeong-do	DKP	DKP
South Jeolla Province	Seo, Gwangju	Park Yun-jong	DJP	DJP
South Jeolla Province	Mokpo–Muan–Sinan	Choi Young-choul	DJP	DJP
South Jeolla Province	Mokpo–Muan–Sinan	Im Jong-ki	DKP	DKP
South Jeolla Province	Yeosu–Yeocheon–Gwangyang	Shin Soon-beon	PPP	NKDP
South Jeolla Province	Yeosu–Yeocheon–Gwangyang	Kim Chai-ho	DJP	DJP
South Jeolla Province	Suncheon–Gurye–Seungju	Huh Kyung-man	DKP	NKDP
South Jeolla Province	Suncheon–Gurye–Seungju	You Kyung-hyun	DJP	DJP
South Jeolla Province	Naju–Gwangsan	Na Sok-ho	DJP	DJP
South Jeolla Province	Naju–Gwangsan	Lee Jai-keun	DKP	DKP
South Jeolla Province	Damyang–Gokseong–Hwasun	Jeong Rae-hyeok (Note: Jeong Rae-hyeok resigned on 29 June 1984.)	DJP	DJP
South Jeolla Province	Damyang–Gokseong–Hwasun	Koh Jae-chung	DKP	DKP
South Jeolla Province	Goheung–Boseong	Lee Dai-soon	DJP	DJP
South Jeolla Province	Goheung–Boseong	Yoo Joon-sang	DKP	DKP
South Jeolla Province	Jangheung–Gangjin–Yeongam–Wando	Kim Sik	DJP	DJP
South Jeolla Province	Jangheung–Gangjin–Yeongam–Wando	Ryu Jae-hui	DKP	DKP
South Jeolla Province	Haenam–Jindo	Lee Seong-il	KNP	KNP
South Jeolla Province	Haenam–Jindo	Min Byeong-cho	DKP	DKP
South Jeolla Province	Yeonggwang–Hampyeong–Jangseong	Cho Ki-sang	DJP	DJP
South Jeolla Province	Yeonggwang–Hampyeong–Jangseong	Lee Won-hyoung	NPP	NPSP
North Gyeongsang Province	Jung–Seo, Daegu	Lee Man-sup	KNP	KNP
North Gyeongsang Province	Jung–Seo, Daegu	Han Byeong-chae	DJP	DJP
North Gyeongsang Province	Dong–Buk, Daegu	Kim Yong-tae	DJP	DJP
North Gyeongsang Province	Dong–Buk, Daegu	Mok Yo-sang	DKP	DKP
North Gyeongsang Province	Nam–Suseong, Daegu	Rhee Chi-ho	DJP	DJP
North Gyeongsang Province	Nam–Suseong, Daegu	Shin Jin-soo	DKP	DKP
North Gyeongsang Province	Pohang–Yeongil–Ulleung	Lee Jeen-woo	DJP	DJP
North Gyeongsang Province	Pohang–Yeongil–Ulleung	Lee Seong-su	KNP	KNP
North Gyeongsang Province	Gyeongju–Wolseong–Cheongdo	Park Kwon-hoem	DJP	DJP
North Gyeongsang Province	Gyeongju–Wolseong–Cheongdo	Kim Sun-gyu	Independent	NKDP
North Gyeongsang Province	Gimcheon–Geumneung–Sangju	Park Chung-soo	Independent	Independent
North Gyeongsang Province	Gimcheon–Geumneung–Sangju	Chung Hui-dong	DJP	DJP
North Gyeongsang Province	Andong City–Andong County–Uiseong	Kwon Jong-dal	DJP	DJP
North Gyeongsang Province	Andong City–Andong County–Uiseong	Kim Young-seang	KNP	KNP
North Gyeongsang Province	Gumi–Gunwi–Seonsan–Chilgok	Park Jae-hong	DJP	DJP
North Gyeongsang Province	Gumi–Gunwi–Seonsan–Chilgok	Kim Hyun-kyiu	DKP	NKDP
North Gyeongsang Province	Yeongju–Yeongpung–Yeongyang–Bonghwa	Oh Han-koo	DJP	DJP
North Gyeongsang Province	Yeongju–Yeongpung–Yeongyang–Bonghwa	Hong Sa-duk	DKP	NKDP
North Gyeongsang Province	Dalseong–Goryeong–Seongju	Lee Yong-taek	Independent	Independent
North Gyeongsang Province	Dalseong–Goryeong–Seongju	Kim Jong-ki	DJP	DJP
North Gyeongsang Province	Yeongdeok–Cheongsong–Uljin	Kim Joong-kwon	DJP	DJP
North Gyeongsang Province	Yeongdeok–Cheongsong–Uljin	Kim Chan-woo	DKP	NKDP
North Gyeongsang Province	Yeongcheon–Gyeongsan	Yum Kil-jung	DJP	DJP
North Gyeongsang Province	Yeongcheon–Gyeongsan	Park Jae-wook	KNP	KNP
North Gyeongsang Province	Mungyeong–Yecheon	Chae Mun-shick	DJP	DJP
North Gyeongsang Province	Mungyeong–Yecheon	Kim Gi-su	KNP	KNP
South Gyeongsang Province	Masan	Jo Jeong-je	DJP	DJP
South Gyeongsang Province	Masan	Baek Chan-ky	DSP	NKDP
South Gyeongsang Province	Ulsan–Ulju	Lee Kyu-jeong	DFP	Independent
South Gyeongsang Province	Ulsan–Ulju	Go Won-jun	DJP	DJP
South Gyeongsang Province	Jinju–Samcheonpo–Jinyang–Sacheon	Ann Byung-kyu	DJP	DJP
South Gyeongsang Province	Jinju–Samcheonpo–Jinyang–Sacheon	Jo Byeong-gyu	KNP	KNP
South Gyeongsang Province	Cheongwon–Jinhae–Uichang	Bae Myung-gook	DJP	DJP
South Gyeongsang Province	Cheongwon–Jinhae–Uichang	Kim Jong-ha	KNP	KNP
South Gyeongsang Province	Chungmu–Tongyeong–Geoje–Goseong	Lee Hyo-ik	DJP	DJP
South Gyeongsang Province	Chungmu–Tongyeong–Geoje–Goseong	Jo Hyeong-bu	Independent	KNP
South Gyeongsang Province	Uiryeong–Haman–Hapcheon	Yu Sang-ho	DJP	DJP
South Gyeongsang Province	Uiryeong–Haman–Hapcheon	Jo Il-je	KNP	KNP
South Gyeongsang Province	Milyang–Changnyeong	Shin Sang-sik	DJP	DJP
South Gyeongsang Province	Milyang–Changnyeong	No Tae-geuk	Independent	KNP
South Gyeongsang Province	Yangsan–Gimhae	Lee Jae-woo	DJP	DJP
South Gyeongsang Province	Yangsan–Gimhae	Sin Won-sik	DKP	DKP
South Gyeongsang Province	Namhae–Hadong	Park Ik-joo	DJP	DJP
South Gyeongsang Province	Namhae–Hadong	Lee Su-jong	Independent	DKP
South Gyeongsang Province	Sancheong–Hamyang–Geochang	Kwon Ik-hyun	DJP	DJP
South Gyeongsang Province	Sancheong–Hamyang–Geochang	Im Chae-hong	CRP	Independent
Jeju Province	Jeju–Bukjeju–Namjeju	Kang Bo-sung	Independent	DKP
Jeju Province	Jeju–Bukjeju–Namjeju	Hyun Kyung-dae	Independent	DJP
National	Proportional representation	Lee Chai-hyung	DJP	DJP
National	Proportional representation	Na Gil-jo	DJP	DJP
National	Proportional representation	Kim Jong-gyeong (Note: Kim Jong-gyeong died on 12 December 1981.)	DJP	DJP
National	Proportional representation	Lee Yong-hoon	DJP	DJP
National	Proportional representation	Kim Ki-chul	DJP	DJP
National	Proportional representation	Song Ji-yeong (Note: Song Ji-yeong resigned on 30 April 1984, upon being appointed as president of the Korean Broadcasting System.)	DJP	DJP
National	Proportional representation	Jeong Hui-taek (Note: Jeong Hui-taek resigned on 4 September 1982, upon being appointed as director of the Board of Audit and Inspection.)	DJP	DJP
National	Proportional representation	Park Dong-jin	DJP	DJP
National	Proportional representation	Jeong Won-min	DJP	DJP
National	Proportional representation	Kim Jeong-ho	DJP	DJP
National	Proportional representation	Yun Seok-sun	DJP	DJP
National	Proportional representation	Kim Chong-hoh	DJP	DJP
National	Proportional representation	Choi Sang-eop	DJP	DJP
National	Proportional representation	Hwang Byeong-jun	DJP	DJP
National	Proportional representation	Ryu Geun-hwan	DJP	DJP
National	Proportional representation	Kim Yong-su	DJP	DJP
National	Proportional representation	Park Tae-joon	DJP	DJP
National	Proportional representation	Park Kyung-suk	DJP	DJP
National	Proportional representation	Lee Woo-jae (Note: Lee Woo-jae resigned on 4 November 1981, upon being appointed as president of the Korea Telecommunications Corporation.)	DJP	DJP
National	Proportional representation	Lee Choon-koo	DJP	DJP
National	Proportional representation	Kim Hyun-ja	DJP	DJP
National	Proportional representation	Chung Soon-duk (Note: Chung Soon-duk resigned on 20 December 1982, upon being appointed as Senior Presidential Secretary for Political Affairs.)	DJP	DJP
National	Proportional representation	Bae Seong-tong	DJP	DJP
National	Proportional representation	Kim Sa-yong	DJP	DJP
National	Proportional representation	Lee Geon-ho	DJP	DJP
National	Proportional representation	Sin Sang-cho	DJP	DJP
National	Proportional representation	O Je-do (Note: O Je-do resigned on 26 December 1984.)	DJP	DJP
National	Proportional representation	Kim Yoon-whan	DJP	DJP
National	Proportional representation	Jeong Hui-chae	DJP	DJP
National	Proportional representation	Kim Chun-su	DJP	DJP
National	Proportional representation	Park Hyeon-tae	DJP	DJP
National	Proportional representation	Lee Yang-u	DJP	DJP
National	Proportional representation	Park Jong-gwan	DJP	DJP
National	Proportional representation	Koh Kwi-nam	DJP	DJP
National	Proportional representation	Rha Woong-bae (Note: Rha Woong-bae resigned on 6 January 1982, upon being appointed as Minister of Finance.)	DJP	DJP
National	Proportional representation	Kim Jip	DJP	DJP
National	Proportional representation	Chi Kap-chong	DJP	DJP
National	Proportional representation	Huh Chung-ill	DJP	DJP
National	Proportional representation	Lee Sang-seon	DJP	DJP
National	Proportional representation	Son Chun-ho	DJP	DJP
National	Proportional representation	Jeong Si-chae	DJP	DJP
National	Proportional representation	An Gyo-deok	DJP	DJP
National	Proportional representation	Choi Rak-cheol	DJP	DJP
National	Proportional representation	Kim Mo-im	DJP	DJP
National	Proportional representation	Lee Heon-gi (Note: Lee Heon-gi resigned on 14 July 1983, upon being appointed as Vice Minister of Health and Social Affairs.)	DJP	DJP
National	Proportional representation	Lee Yoon-ja	DJP	DJP
National	Proportional representation	Lee Min-sup	DJP	DJP
National	Proportional representation	Lee Yeong-hui	DJP	DJP
National	Proportional representation	Kim Chong-in	DJP	DJP
National	Proportional representation	Park Won-tak	DJP	DJP
National	Proportional representation	Rhee Shang-hi	DJP	DJP
National	Proportional representation	Lee Young-il	DJP	DJP
National	Proportional representation	Lee Gyeong-suk	DJP	DJP
National	Proportional representation	Cho Nam-jo	DJP	DJP
National	Proportional representation	Kim Haeng-ja (Note: Kim Haeng-ja died on 12 November 1982.)	DJP	DJP
National	Proportional representation	Lee Nak-hun	DJP	DJP
National	Proportional representation	Kim Yung-koo	DJP	DJP
National	Proportional representation	Hwang Seol	DJP	DJP
National	Proportional representation	Ha Soon-bong	DJP	DJP
National	Proportional representation	Gwak Jeong-hyeon	DJP	DJP
National	Proportional representation	Jeon Byung-woo	DJP	DJP
National	Proportional representation	Chung Chang-wha (Note: Chung Chang-wha took office on 4 November 1981, to succeed Lee Woo-jae.)	DJP	DJP
National	Proportional representation	Mun Yong-ju (Note: Mun Yong-ju took office on 12 December 1981, to succeed Kim Jong-gyeong.)	DJP	DJP
National	Proportional representation	Kim Yu-sang (Note: Kim Yu-sang took office on 6 January 1982, to succeed Rha Woong-bae.)	DJP	DJP
National	Proportional representation	Chang Kyung-woo (Note: Chang Kyung-woo took office on 4 September 1982, to succeed Jeong Hui-taek.)	DJP	DJP
National	Proportional representation	Ryu Su-hwan (Note: Ryu Su-hwan took office on 12 November 1982, to succeed Kim Haeng-ja.)	DJP	DJP
National	Proportional representation	Kim Ji-ho (Note: Kim Ji-ho took office on 20 December 1982, to succeed Chung Soon-duk.)	DJP	DJP
National	Proportional representation	Kang Chang-hee (Note: Kang Chang-hee took office on 14 July 1983, to succeed Lee Heon-gi.)	DJP	DJP
National	Proportional representation	Lee Seong-bae (Note: Lee Seong-bae took office on 30 April 1984, to succeed Song Ji-yeong.)	DJP	DJP
National	Proportional representation	Yu Ok-u (Note: Yu Ok-u died on 15 March 1984.)	DKP	DKP
National	Proportional representation	Lee Tae-gu	DKP	DKP
National	Proportional representation	Kim Mun-seok	DKP	DKP
National	Proportional representation	Hwang San-seong	DKP	DKP
National	Proportional representation	Yang Jae-gwon	DKP	DKP
National	Proportional representation	Jeong Gyu-heon	DKP	DKP
National	Proportional representation	Son Tai-gon	DKP	DKP
National	Proportional representation	Sin Jae-hyu	DKP	DKP
National	Proportional representation	Lee Jeong-bin	DKP	DKP
National	Proportional representation	Kim Jin-gi	DKP	DKP
National	Proportional representation	Lee Jung-hui	DKP	DKP
National	Proportional representation	Yon Je-won	DKP	DKP
National	Proportional representation	Choi Su-hwan	DKP	NKDP
National	Proportional representation	Seu Jong-yeul	DKP	DKP
National	Proportional representation	Son Jeong-hyeok	DKP	NKDP
National	Proportional representation	Kim No-sik	DKP	DKP
National	Proportional representation	Lee Ui-yeong	DKP	DKP
National	Proportional representation	Jo Ju-hyeong	DKP	DKP
National	Proportional representation	Gang Won-chae	DKP	DKP
National	Proportional representation	Lee Yun-gi	DKP	DKP
National	Proportional representation	Yun Gi-dae	DKP	DKP
National	Proportional representation	Lee Hong-bae	DKP	DKP
National	Proportional representation	Kim Hyung-rhae	DKP	NKDP
National	Proportional representation	Kim Duk-kyu	DKP	DKP
National	Proportional representation	Lee Yong-gon (Note: Lee Yong-gon took office on 15 March 1984, to succeed Yu Ok-u.)	DKP	DKP
National	Proportional representation	Kim Young-kwang	KNP	KNP
National	Proportional representation	Lee Pil-u	KNP	KNP
National	Proportional representation	No Cha-tae	KNP	KNP
National	Proportional representation	Jo Jeong-gu	KNP	KNP
National	Proportional representation	Kim Han-seon	KNP	KNP
National	Proportional representation	Kim Yu-bok	KNP	KNP
National	Proportional representation	Kang Ki-pil	KNP	KNP
