= Lists of members of the National Assembly (South Korea) =

This article lists South Korean legislative elections and its members by term of office.

== Lists ==
Term	Election	Elect	
Term	Election	Start	End
List of members of the South Korean Constituent Assembly	1948 South Korean Constitutional Assembly election	31 May 1948	30 May 1950
List of members of the National Assembly (South Korea), 1950–1954	1950 South Korean legislative election	31 May 1950	30 May 1954
List of members of the National Assembly (South Korea), 1954–1958	1954 South Korean legislative election	31 May 1954	30 May 1958
	1958 South Korean legislative election		
1963 South Korean legislative election
1967 South Korean legislative election
1971 South Korean legislative election
1973 South Korean legislative election
1976 South Korean legislative election
1978 South Korean legislative election
List of members of the National Assembly (South Korea), 1981–1985	1981 South Korean legislative election	11 April 1981	10 April 1985
List of members of the National Assembly (South Korea), 1985–1988	1985 South Korean legislative election	11 April 1985	29 May 1988
List of members of the National Assembly (South Korea), 1988–1992	1988 South Korean legislative election	30 May 1988	29 May 1992
List of members of the National Assembly (South Korea), 1992–1996	1992 South Korean legislative election	30 May 1992	29 May 1996
List of members of the National Assembly (South Korea), 1996–2000	1996 South Korean legislative election	30 May 1996	29 May 2000
List of members of the National Assembly (South Korea), 2000–2004	2000 South Korean legislative election	30 May 2000	29 May 2004
List of members of the National Assembly (South Korea), 2004–2008	2004 South Korean legislative election	30 May 2004	29 May 2008
List of members of the National Assembly (South Korea), 2008–2012	2008 South Korean legislative election	30 May 2008	29 May 2012
List of members of the National Assembly (South Korea), 2012–2016	2012 South Korean legislative election	30 May 2012	29 May 2016
List of members of the National Assembly (South Korea), 2016–2020	2016 South Korean legislative election	30 May 2016	29 May 2020
List of members of the National Assembly (South Korea), 2020–2024	2020 South Korean legislative election	30 May 2020	29 May 2024
List of members of the National Assembly (South Korea), 2024–2028	2024 South Korean legislative election	30 May 2024	-

== See also ==
- Government of South Korea
- National Assembly (South Korea)
