= Cho Soon-seung =

South Korean politician (1929–2022)

Member of the National Assembly of South Korea
- In office 30 May 1988 – 29 May 2000

Personal details
- Born: 22 March 1929 Zenranan Province, Korea, Empire of Japan
- Died: 5 February 2022 (aged 92)
- Party: Peace Democratic Party; Democratic Party; National Congress for New Politics
- Education: Seoul National University; University of Michigan

Cho Soon-seung (Korean: 조순승; 22 March 1929 – 5 February 2022) was a South Korean politician.

A member of the Peace Democratic Party, the Democratic Party, and the National Congress for New Politics, he served in the National Assembly from 1988 to 2000. He died on 5 February 2022, at the age of 92.
