= 1981 South Korean presidential election =

- Presidential election
- 25 February 1981

5,277 (Note: 5,278 electors had been elected, but DJP elector Kim Chang-sik of Busan was removed due to eligibility problems.) members of the Electoral College 2,639 electoral votes needed to win
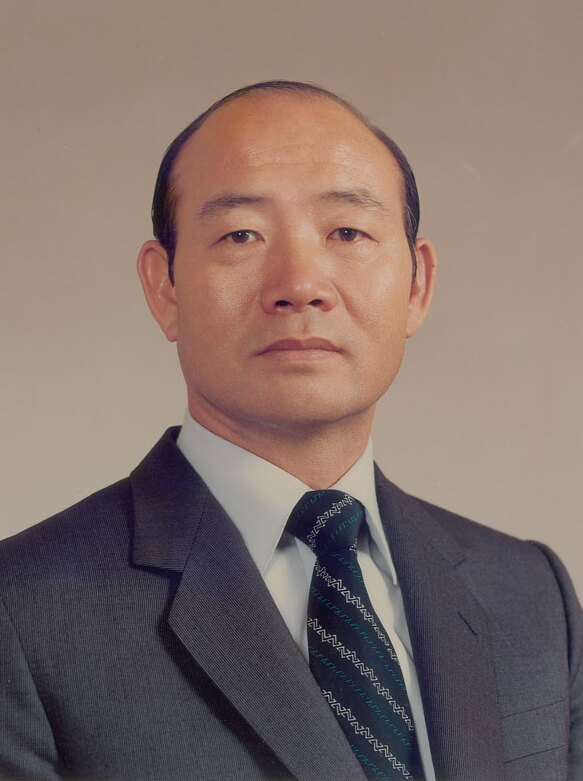
		DKP
Nominee	Chun Doo-hwan	Yu Chi-song
Party	Democratic; Justice	Democratic Korea
Electoral vote	4,755	404
Percentage	90.23%	7.67%
- Electoral College election
- 11 February 1981
- Turnout: 78.12%
Party	Leader	Vote %	Seats
Democratic Justice	Chun Doo-hwan	60.71	3,667
Democratic Korea	Yu Chi-song	11.67	411
National	Kim Chong-cheol	1.15	49
Civil Rights	Kim Eui-taek	0.82	19
Independents	–	25.66	1,132
This lists parties that won seats. See the complete results below.
- Electoral College vote
President before election
Chun Doo-hwan
Democratic Justice
Elected President
Chun Doo-hwan
Democratic Justice

Two-stage presidential elections were held in South Korea in February 1981. An electoral college was elected on 11 February, which in turn elected the president on 25 February. They were the last indirect presidential elections controlled by the government of Chun Doo-hwan under the new 1980 constitution. Chun was re-elected with 90% of the electoral college vote.

== Background ==
Rising to prominence as the leader of the military after the assassination of former military dictator of South Korea Park Chung-hee, Security Commander Chun Doo-hwan successfully forced Park's successor Choi Kyu-hah to step down from the presidency and became president himself through the indirect elections of 1980.

He then revised the Constitution on 27 October 1980. The revised constitution was slightly less authoritarian than its predecessor. Among other things, it changed the presidential election system. Although it was still an indirect election by the electoral college, opposition candidates were now allowed to enter. The president was limited to a single seven-year term without the possibility of re-election, and any change allowing re-election was blocked from taking effect for the president in office at the time of amendment. However, this had no effect on the political landscape. Chun had jailed most prominent opposition politicians, including former NDP chairman Kim Young-sam, 1971 NDP presidential nominee Kim Dae-jung, and former prime minister Kim Jong-pil, all three of whom would later face Chun's handpicked successor, Roh Tae-Woo, in the 1987 presidential election.

== Presidential nominations ==
The Democratic Justice Party (DJP) National Convention was held on 15 January at Jamsil Gymnasium in Seoul. At the convention, 3,162 delegates from around the nation nominated the sitting President Chun Doo-hwan without a vote.

The Democratic Korea Party (DKP) National Convention was held on 17 January at the Sejong Center for Performing Arts in Seoul. Yu Chi-song, a former 3-term lawmaker from Gyeonggi, was nominated as the party's candidate for president.

The Korea Nationalist Party (KNP) National Convention was held on 23 January at the Sejong Center for Performing Arts, and saw Kim Chong-cheol, a former five-term lawmaker from South Chungcheong, nominated.

The Civil Rights Party National Convention was held on 23 January at the Cheondo Hall; Kim Eui-taek, a former four-term lawmaker from South Jeolla was chosen as the party's candidate.

Other political parties including the Democratic Socialist Party, the Socialist Party and the New Politics Party announced they would not be participating in the elections as they were not capable of finding viable candidates for president or the electoral college.

== Electoral College nominations ==
Province/City	Seats	Candidates nominated					
Province/City	Seats	DJP	DKP	KNP	CRP	DSP	Ind.
Seoul	856	753	199	18	29	0	482
Busan	324	277	66	3	5	0	153
Gyeonggi	670	713	221	8	16	0	252
Gangwon	299	293	82	12	3	0	206
North Chungcheong	256	270	74	18	5	1	105
South Chungcheong	465	428	121	34	9	0	173
North Jeolla	407	387	95	5	19	0	220
South Jeolla	606	516	118	29	6	0	386
North Gyeongsang	755	664	88	1	0	0	626
South Gyeongsang	587	578	97	9	9	0	322
Jeju	53	49	4	0	0	0	26
Total	5,278	4,928	1,165	137	101	1	2,951
Source: Central Administration Committee

== Electoral College election ==
According to official figures, 78.1% of registered voters voted, and gave Chun's DJP a supermajority of 3,667 seats in the electoral college, 69.5 percent of the total. The DJP won three times as many seats as independent candidates, and nine times as many seats as the largest opposition party, the Democratic Korea Party.

Party	Votes	%	Seats
Democratic Justice Party	9,250,262	60.71	3,667
Democratic Korea Party	1,778,007	11.67	411
Korean National Party	174,708	1.15	49
Civil Rights Party	124,215	0.82	19
Democratic Socialist Party	825	0.01	0
Independents	3,909,826	25.66	1,132
Total	15,237,843	100.00	5,278
Valid votes	15,237,843	97.68	
Invalid/blank votes	361,409	2.32	
Total votes	15,599,252	100.00	
Registered voters/turnout	19,967,287	78.12	
Source: Central Administration Committee

=== By province and city ===
Province/City	DJP			DKP			KNP			CRP			DSP			Independent			Total	
Province/City	Votes	%	Seats	Votes	%	Seats	Votes	%	Seats	Votes	%	Seats	Votes	%	Seats	Votes	%	Seats	Votes	Seats
Seoul	1,918,215	56.51	551	540,552	15.92	137	29,647	0.87	4	48,868	1.44	7	0	0.00	0	857,442	25.26	157	3,394,724	856
Busan	799,981	63.79	234	148,403	11.83	33	9,397	0.75	2	4,491	0.36	0	0	0.00	0	291,745	23.26	55	1,254,017	324
Gyeonggi	1,361,727	69.03	545	283,184	14.35	44	12,297	0.62	3	17,937	0.91	3	0	0.00	0	297,622	15.09	75	1,972,767	670
Gangwon	523,467	64.15	240	75,430	9.24	4	15,716	1.93	3	1,932	0.24	0	0	0.00	0	199,444	24.44	52	815,989	299
North Chungcheong	423,375	65.81	207	77,118	11.99	13	20,920	3.25	3	3,993	0.62	0	825	0.13	0	117,071	18.20	33	643,302	256
South Chungcheong	669,381	62.96	338	133,964	12.60	42	35,604	3.35	10	8,121	0.76	0	0	0.00	0	216,173	20.33	75	1,063,248	465
North Jeolla	607,747	62.62	291	106,700	10.99	26	4,552	0.47	0	24,520	2.53	6	0	0.00	0	227,064	23.39	84	970,583	407
South Jeolla	763,293	52.18	351	160,666	10.98	51	34,406	2.35	20	6,120	0.42	1	0	0.00	0	498,328	34.07	183	1,462,813	606
North Gyeongsang	1,249,107	57.48	449	125,530	5.78	26	803	0.04	0	0	0.00	0	0	0.00	0	797,702	36.71	280	2,173,142	755
South Gyeongsang	815,478	62.10	420	116,802	8.89	34	11,366	0.87	4	8,233	0.63	2	0	0.00	0	361,358	27.52	127	1,313,237	587
Jeju	118,491	68.09	41	9,658	5.55	1	0	0.00	0	0	0.00	0	0	0.00	0	45,872	26.36	11	174,021	53
Total	9,250,262	60.71	3,667	1,778,007	11.67	411	174,708	1.15	49	124,215	0.82	19	825	0.1	0	3,909,821	25.66	1,132	15,237,838	5,278
Source: Central Administration Committee

== Electoral College vote ==
In order to be elected, a candidate had to receive the vote of over 50% of the incumbent members of the Electoral College. Of the 5,277 electors who were elected on 11 February and had not been removed from office (one member was removed in Busan), this meant 2,639 votes were needed to win. Sitting president Chun Doo-hwan was re-elected by a landslide on 25 February with 4,755 votes, 90.11% of the total possible. However, the DJP's supermajority in the electoral college meant Chun's election was all but assured.

Candidate	Party	Votes	%
Chun Doo-hwan	Democratic Justice Party	4,755	90.23
Yu Chi-song	Democratic Korea Party	404	7.67
Kim Chong-cheol	Korean National Party	85	1.61
Kim Eui-taek	Civil Rights Party	26	0.49
Total		5,270	100.00
Valid votes		5,270	99.98
Invalid/blank votes		1	0.02
Total votes		5,271	100.00
Registered voters/turnout		5,277	99.89
Source: Central Administration Committee

=== By province and city ===
Province/City	Chun Doo-hwan		Yu Chi-song		Kim Chong-cheol		Kim Eui-taek	
Province/City	Votes	%	Votes	%	Votes	%	Votes	%
Seoul	703	82.22	133	15.56	11	1.29	8	0.94
Busan	285	88.79	33	10.28	3	0.93	0	0.00
Gyeonggi	620	92.54	43	6.42	4	0.60	3	0.45
Gangwon	292	97.66	4	1.34	3	1.00	0	0.00
North Chungcheong	238	92.97	14	5.47	4	1.56	0	0.00
South Chungcheong	406	87.31	41	8.82	18	3.87	0	0.00
North Jeolla	369	91.34	25	6.19	3	0.74	7	1.73
South Jeolla	521	85.97	51	8.42	28	4.62	6	0.99
North Gyeongsang	723	95.89	29	3.85	2	0.27	0	0.00
South Gyeongsang	546	93.02	30	5.11	9	1.53	2	0.34
Jeju	52	98.11	1	1.89	0	0.00	0	0.00
Total	4,755	90.23	404	7.67	85	1.61	26	0.49
Source: Central Administration Committee

== Aftermath ==
The term of the newly elected president officially began on the day the electoral votes were cast and counted, 25 February. The inauguration ceremony took place on 3 March. This marked the official beginning of the Fifth Republic of Korea, a dictatorial regime that lasted until democratization in 1988.
