= New Korean Democratic Party =

1984–1988 political party in South Korea

New Korean Democratic Party 신한민주당 新韓民主黨
- Abbreviation: NKDP
- Founded: 17 December 1984
- Legalised: 18 January 1985
- Dissolved: 28 April 1988
- Merger of: People's Democratic (Note: 4 April 1987)
- Merged into: Reunification Democratic
- Ideology: Liberalism (South Korean)
- Political position: Centre to centre-right
- Colours: Scarlet

Party flag

The New Korean Democratic Party (Korean: 신한민주당; Hanja: 新韓民主黨; RR: Sinhanminjudang, NKDP) was an opposition political party of South Korea from 1984 to 1988. It was the largest opposition party in South Korea until Kim Dae-jung and Kim Young-sam left to form the Reunification Democratic Party.

== History ==
=== Formation ===
The party was formed by the notable figures of New Democratic Party (NDP) and Council for the Promotion of Democracy (CPD).

Most of NDP politicians including Kim Young-sam and Kim Dae-jung were banned by Hanahoe (Group of One) of Chun Doo-hwan in 1980. There were 2 opposition parties formed at this time ― Democratic Korea Party (DKP) and National Party of Korea (Nat'l). Nevertheless, both were often regarded as satellite parties of the ruling Democratic Justice Party.

Many of the former NDP and CPD members formed New Korean Democratic Party, in a purpose of the "real opposition", after their political bans were lifted in December 1984. Originally, they intended to re-establish the NDP, but impossible because the name "NDP" was prohibited. Instead, they opted "New Korean Democratic Party" that can be abbreviated as "New Democratic Party (NDP)".

The party was officially founded on 18 January 1985, and elected Lee Min-woo as the Chairman.

=== 1985 election and aftermath ===
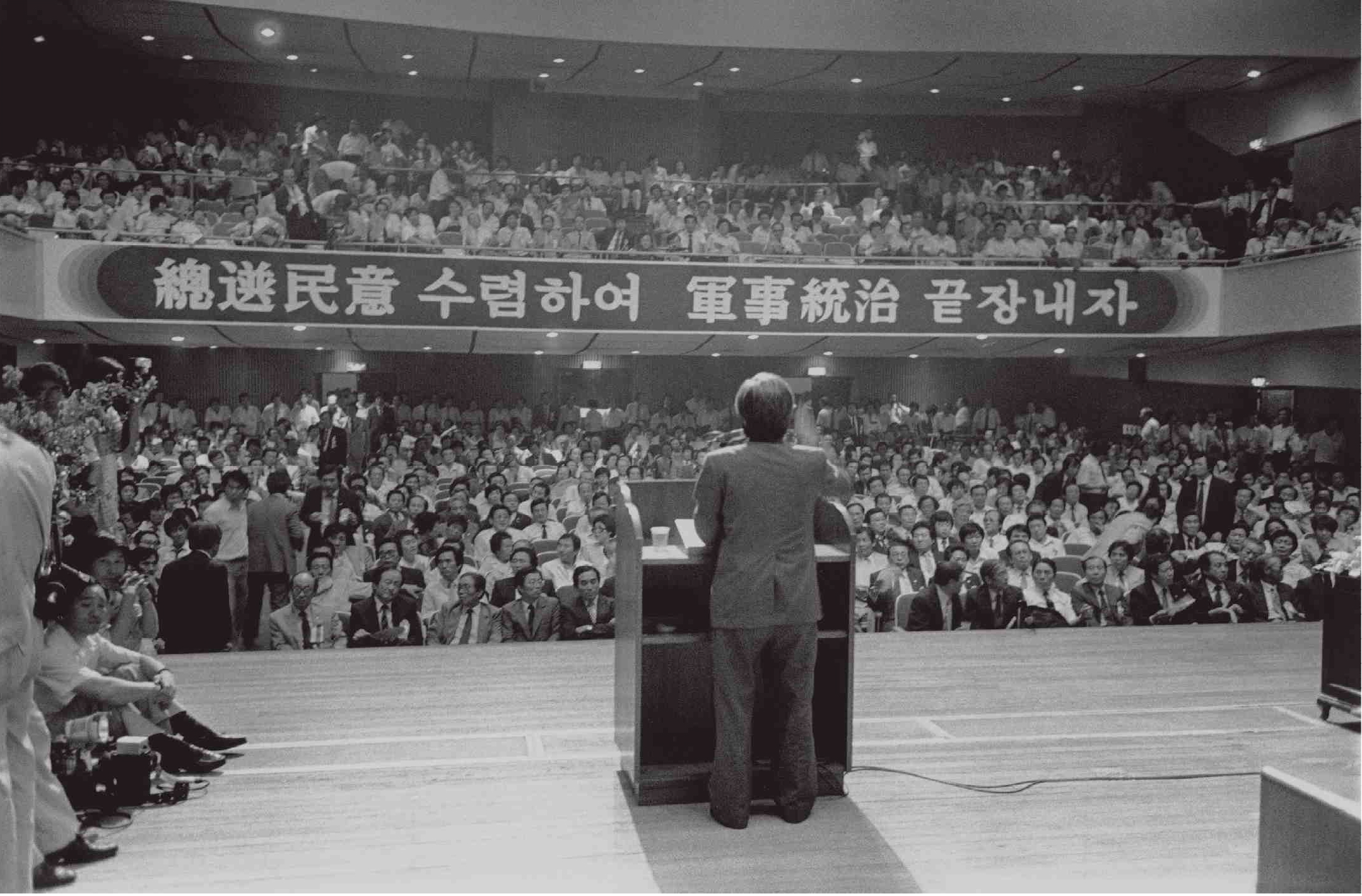
The New Korean Democratic Party convention in August 1985

The party, however, faced the general election on 12 February, shortly after the formation. Due to the short preparation time along with the government's election fraud, the party was expected to be defeated. The Agency for National Security Planning analysed that NKDP would barely win around 20 seats, and in addition, Chairman Lee running for Jongro & Central District of Seoul, would be lost in the constituency.

Nevertheless, the party shockingly won in the election, receiving 29.3% and won 67 out of 276 seats, made it as the main opposition in the National Assembly. Furthermore, Lee, who received 31.63%, also won in his constituency.

Their seats were later increased up to 103, after some MPs from DKP and Nat'l defected to NKDP, which occurred serious conflicts between the government and the opposition. This, however, also boosted the government's repression that reached its zenith when the party's MP Yoo Sung-hwan was arrested after his parliamentary speech on 14 October 1986.

=== Decline and dissolution ===
The party faced an internal conflict after Lee announced his own plan, named "Lee Min-woo Plan", which supported parliamentary system. This was strongly objected by Kim Young-sam (YS) and Kim Dae-jung (DJ), who advocated to maintain the incumbent presidential system but sought for direct election of the President. Finally, both pro-YS and pro-DJ factions broke the party out and founded United Democratic Party (UDP) on 21 April 1987.

Since 74 MPs defected to UDP, the seats were plummeted up to 26. Although the minor People's Democratic Party merged itself with NKDP in April 1987, the party never revived, and didn't even put a candidate for upcoming presidential election. Lee also resigned his chairmanship and retired from the politics on 6 November.

On 15 January 1988, the acting Shin Do-hwan was officially elected as the new Chairman. However, the party lost all seats in 1988 election, and was subsequently deregistered on 28 April.

== Leadership ==
=== Chairmen ===
No.	President(s)	Period
1	Lee Min-woo	18 January 1985 – 6 November 1987
	Lee Taek-hui (interim)	27 November 1987 – 5 January 1988
2	Shin Do-hwan	15 January 1988 (Note: acting from 5 to 15 January) – 26 April 1988

== Election results ==
Election	Leader	Votes	%	Seats				Position	Status
Election	Leader	Votes	%	Constituency	Party list	Total	+/–	Position	Status
1985	Lee Min-woo	5,843,827	29.26	50 / 184	17 / 92	67 / 276	new	2nd	Opposition
1988	Shin Do-hwan	46,877	0.24	0 / 224	0 / 75	0 / 299	▼67	8th	Extra-parliamentary
