= Reunification Democratic Party =

1987–1990 political party in South Korea

- Leader: Kim Young-sam
- Founded: 1 May 1987
- Dissolved: 1 January 1990
- Split from: New Korean Democratic
- Merged into: Democratic Liberal (Kim Young-sam faction)
- Succeeded by: Peace Democratic (Kim Dae-jung faction)
- Ideology: Liberalism (South Korean); Centrist reformism
- Political position: Centre to centre-right
- Colours: Red (customary); Blue

Party flag

- Reunification Democratic Party
- Hangul: 통일민주당
- Hanja: 統一民主黨
- RR: Tongil minjudang
- MR: T'ongil minjudang

The Reunification Democratic Party (RDP; Korean: 통일민주당; lit. 'United Democratic Party') was a political party of South Korea from 1987 to 1990. The party was established in April 1987 by Kim Dae-jung and Kim Young-sam, splitting from the New Korean Democratic Party. The party faced another split later that year with Kim Dae-jung and his followers organizing Peace Democratic Party. The party later merged with conservative Democratic Justice Party and New Democratic Republican Party in January 1990. The party members who opposed the merger formed the Democratic Party. The party had strong support in the Southeastern region of the country, including the South Gyeongsang Province and the city of Busan.

== History ==
The party was formed on 21 April 1987 as a split from the New Korean Democratic Party by Kim Young-sam and Kim Dae-jung. Despite the strong gains the party achieved in the 1985 legislative election, internal conflicts grew within the party, especially on the intensity of the struggle against the dictatorship and demand for a direct, democratic election of the president. Kim Young-sam and Kim Dae-jung took hard-line against the Chun regime, while the erstwhile party leader, Lee Min-woo took the more conciliatory tone. The issue came to fore with the revelation of "Lee Min-woo Plan" (이민우 구상) on December 24, 1986. Lee Min-woo declared his willingness to accept the constitutional revision to the parliamentary system. The plan was criticized by both Kim Young-sam and Kim Dae-jung as a capitulation to the dictatorship, and were personally humiliated that Lee Min-woo hasn't discussed the plan with them prior. Growing discord culminated with the split of Kim Dae-jung and Kim Young-sam's followers from the New Korea Democratic Party, and formation of Reunification Democratic Party in April 1987.

Following the June Struggle of 1987, and the June 29 Declaration, which Roh Tae-woo promised direct, democratic election of the president in the upcoming presidential election in December of that year, speculation for the potential candidacy of Kim Dae-jung for the presidency grew. The Declaration also promised amnesty to Kim Dae-jung, who was under the house-arrest and was barred from engaging in any political activity under the fabricated charge of "inciting rebellion" since 1971. While Kim Dae-jung was barred from engaging in any political activities, Kim Young-sam emerged as the main opposition leader. Despite the effort to present the single opposition candidate for the 1987 presidential election, the negotiation between two politicians broke down. Kim Dae-jung and his followers split from the Reunification Democratic Party and created the Peace Democratic Party in October 29, less than 2 months before the election. Kim Dae-jung and Kim Young-sam's candidacy resulted in vote-splitting of the opposition candidates, resulting in the election of Roh Tae-woo, protégé of dictator Chun Doo-hwan to take the office with 36.6% of votes.

In the following 1988 legislative election, Reunification Democratic Party received a disappointing result. While the party retained electorate in the Gyeongsong South Province, winning 14 out of 15 seats in the city of Busan, the first-past-the-post electoral system resulted in the party coming third in terms of the seat number, despite winning more than 900,000 votes than the Peace Democratic Party.

=== Merged with the ruling party ===
Faced with the disappointing election results and the rising of Kim Dae-jung's Peace Democratic Party, Kim Young-sam and his followers in the party decided to accept the proposal to merge the party with the ruling Democratic Justice Party and conservative New Democratic Republican Party. The decision was heavily criticized from both inside and outside of the party, perceived as being tantamount to "treason", joining forces with the remnants of the military dictatorships of Park Chung-hee (represented by the New Democratic Republican Party) and Chun Doo-hwan (represented by the Democratic Justice Party). Kim replied to the criticism that one "has to enter the tiger's cave to catch the tiger". The party members who opposed the merger, including Roh Moo-hyun and Lee Ki-taek, formed the new Democratic Party in 1990 and later merged with Kim Dae-jung's Peace Democratic Party to form a new Democratic Party. Reunification Democratic Party was dissolved on 22 January 1990, joining the newly formed Democratic Liberal Party. Kim Young-sam later succeeded Roh's leadership in 1992 and became the next President.

== Election results ==
=== President ===
Election	Candidate	Votes	%	Result
1987	Kim Young-sam	6,337,581	28.04	Not elected

=== Legislature ===
Election	Leader	Votes	%	Seats			Position	Status
Election	Leader	Votes	%	Constituency	Party list	Total	Position	Status
1988	Kim Myeong-yun	4,680,175	23.83	46 / 224	13 / 75	59 / 299	3rd	Opposition

== See also ==
- List of political parties in South Korea
- Politics of South Korea
- Elections in South Korea
- Liberalism in South Korea
