= Kim Jong-in =

Kim Jong-in (Korean: 김종인) may refer to:

- Kai, a member of South Korean–Chinese boy band EXO, whose real name is Kim Jong-in.
- Kim Chong-in, a South Korean politician and economist.
