= Kim Chong-in =

South Korean economist and politician (born 1940)

- 김종인
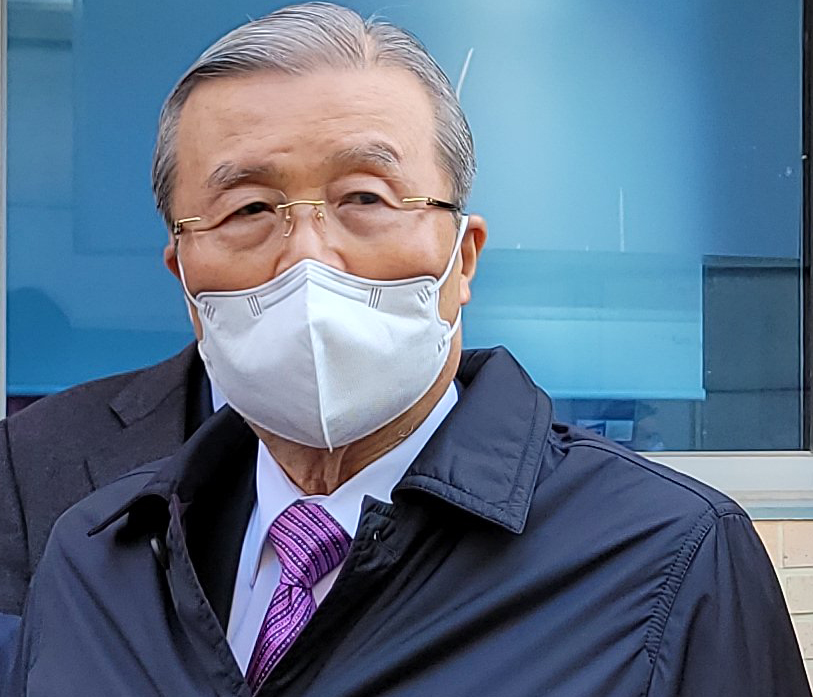

Leader of the People Power Party
- Interim
- In office 27 May 2020 – 8 April 2021
- Preceded by: Joo Ho-young (acting)
- Succeeded by: Joo Ho-young (acting)

Leader of the Democratic Party
- Interim
- In office 27 January 2016 – 27 August 2016
- Preceded by: Moon Jae-in
- Succeeded by: Choo Mi-ae

Member of the National Assembly
- In office 30 May 2016 – 8 March 2017
- Constituency: Proportional representation
- In office 30 May 2004 – 29 May 2008
- In office 30 May 1992 – 10 September 1994
- In office 11 April 1981 – 29 May 1988
- Constituency: Proportional representation

Minister of Health and Social Affairs
- In office 19 July 1989 – 13 March 1990
- President: Roh Tae-woo
- Preceded by: Moon Tae-joon
- Succeeded by: Kim Jung-soo

Personal details
- Born: 7 July 1940 (age 86) Shikō, Korea, Empire of Japan
- Party: Independent
- Other political affiliations: Democratic Justice Party (1981–1990); Democratic Liberal Party (1990–1994); Democratic Party (2004–2007); United Democratic Party (2008); Democratic Party (2008); Grand National Party (2011–2012); Saenuri (2012–2013); Democratic Party of Korea (2016–2017); United Future Party (2020); People Power Party (2020–2021)
- Education: Hankuk University of Foreign Studies; University of Münster
- Occupation: Politician, economist

Korean name
- Hangul: 김종인
- Hanja: 金鍾仁
- RR: Gim Jongin
- MR: Kim Chongin

Kim Chong-in (Korean: 김종인; born 7 July 1940) is a South Korean economist and politician who served as the acting leader of the Democratic Party of Korea (DPK) from January to August 2016 and as the acting leader of the People Power Party from May 2020 to April 2021.

Kim was previously a member of the National Assembly from 1981 to 1988, 1992 to 1994, 2004 to 2008, and 2016 to 2017. He previously served as the minister of health and social affairs under President Roh Tae-woo from 1989 to 1990.

== Early life ==
Before entering politics, Kim studied German language at the Hankuk University of Foreign Studies as an undergraduate, and obtained a doctorate in economics at the University of Münster in Germany in 1972. His dissertation at Münster was titled "Possibilities and Limits of Social Policy in the Present Social–Economic Situation in the Republic of Korea". He was professor at Sogang University, and board chairman of KB Kookmin Bank, the largest private bank of Korea.

== Political career ==
=== Conservative parties until 2015 ===
Kim spent his early political career in the Democratic Justice Party of Presidents Chun Doo-hwan and Roh Tae-woo, and followed the party when it merged with two other conservative parties to form the Democratic Liberal Party in 1990.

He remained in the party's successors, becoming an assemblyman for the Grand National Party in 2004 and subsequently a campaign and economic advisor to President Park Geun-hye. He served as chairman of the Saenuri Party's Special Committee to Promote People's Happiness during Park's campaign, promoting economic democratization and the party's business-friendly image.

He was later marginalized by Park, and separated from the president and her economic cabinet, for reasons which are in dispute. In January 2015, he criticized Park for "not being able to recognize a problem", and commented on his own plans that he had "lost trust in people": "I do not have much desire to talk".

=== Democratic Party (2016–2017) ===
After stepping down as Park's advisor, Kim subsequently joined the liberal opposition Democratic Party as chairman of the Emergency Planning Commission. This followed the resignation of Moon Jae-in as party leader in January 2016.

As party leader, Kim's role was to prepare for the upcoming legislative election and aimed to unify the party by diminishing the influence of entrenched factions. He targeted leading members of the pro–Roh Moo-hyun faction of the party, including Lee Hae-chan, whom he deselected from the party nomination process. Kim faced calls to resign over the process, but decided to stay on as leader, pledging to continue reforming the party. Despite losing most of the seats in its traditional stronghold of Honam to the new People's Party, the party gained a favorable result in the elections under his leadership, defeating the ruling Saenuri Party and winning a plurality of seats in the Assembly.

Kim consolidated his control over the Democratic Party with the favorable 2016 election result. A week after the election, he announced that the party would reorient from welfare advocacy to support for economic growth and corporate reform, and dropped the party's prior policy of opposition to for-profit hospitals.

Kim left the Democratic Party following greater disagreement with Moon Jae-in in March 2017. In leaving the party, he also gave up his proportional representative seat in the National Assembly.

=== 2017 South Korean presidential election ===
Kim announced his independent candidacy in the 2017 South Korean presidential election to oppose Moon Jae-in in April 2017 after leaving the Democratic Party. Kim dropped out a week later calling for a need of a coalition government.

He then supported the minor centrist People's Party presidential candidate Ahn Cheol-soo in the presidential election, agreeing to lead Ahn's campaign panel that supports a "reformist" government.

== Election results ==
Year	Elections	Constituency	Political party	Votes (%)	Results
1981	11th National Assembly General Election	National (49th)	DJP	5,776,624 (35.64%)	Elected
1985	12th National Assembly General Election	National (32nd)	DJP	7,040,477 (35.25%)	Elected
1988	13th National Assembly General Election	Gwanak B (Seoul)	DJP	34,752 (27.13%)	Defeated
1992	14th National Assembly General Election	National (11st)	DLP	7,923,718 (38.49%)	Elected
2004	17th National Assembly General Election	Proportional representation (2nd)	MDP	1,510,178 (7.09%)	Elected
2016	20th National Assembly General Election	Proportional representation (2nd)	Democratic	6,069,744 (25.54%)	Elected
