= Lee Woo-jae =

South Korean politician (1934–2024)

- 이우재

Member of the National Assembly of South Korea
- In office 1981

Ministry of Postal Service
- In office 19 July 1989 – 26 December 1990
- President: Roh Tae-woo
- Prime Minister: Kang Young-hoon
- Preceded by: Choi Young-chul
- Succeeded by: Song Eun-jong

Personal details
- Born: 5 May 1934
- Died: 12 July 2024 (aged 90)
- Party: Democratic Justice Party

Lee Woo-jae (Korean: 이우재; Hanja: 李祐在; 5 May 1934 – 12 July 2024) was a South Korean politician. He served as minister of Postal Service from 1989 to 1990. He was a member of the Hanahoe, a private organization within the South Korean army. He participated in the founding of the Fifth Republic from its inception in 1980, when he was included as a permanent member of the Hanahoe-led National Security Emergency Committee. After serving as a proportional representative of the Democratic Justice Party in the 11th National Assembly, he was appointed the first president of the Korea Telecommunications Corporation in 1981.

Lee died on 12 July 2024, at the age of 90.
