= Peace Democratic Party =

1987–1991 political party in South Korea

- Leader: Kim Dae-jung
- Founded: 29 October 1987 (Note: as Peace Democratic Party); 15 April 1991 (Note: as New United Democratic Party)
- Dissolved: 16 September 1991
- Split from: Reunification Democratic (Note: Dae-jung faction)
- Merged into: Democratic
- Ideology: Liberalism (South Korean); Centrist reformism; Moderate conservatism
- Political position: Centre
- Colours: Yellow; Green

Party flag
- Politics of South Korea; Political parties; Elections; A: The party promoted a number of policies that were economically liberal and socially conservative. As leftist/progressive ideologies had been illegal in Korea for a long time by that point, their policies were considered moderate reformist and even moderately progressive.

- New United Democratic Party
- Hangul: 신민주연합당
- Hanja: 新民主聯合黨
- RR: Sinminju yeonhapdang
- MR: Sinminju yŏnhaptang

Peace Democratic Party
- Hangul: 평화민주당
- Hanja: 平和民主黨
- RR: Pyeonghwa minjudang
- MR: P'yŏnghwa minjudang

The New United Democratic Party (NUDP; Korean: 신민주연합당) was a political party of South Korea from 1987 to 1991. The party was established as the Peace Democratic Party (PDP; 평화민주당) in October 1987 by Kim Dae-jung and his followers to contest the presidential election that year. The party later merged with Democratic Party to form the Democratic Party.

== History ==
Following the June Struggle of 1987, and the June 29 Declaration, which promised direct, democratic election of the president in the upcoming presidential election in December of that year, speculation for the potential candidacy of Kim Dae-jung for the presidency grew. The Declaration also promised amnesty to Kim Dae-jung, who was under the house-arrest and was barred from engaging in any political activity under the fabricated charge of "inciting rebellion" since 1981. While Kim Dae-jung was barred from engaging in any political activities, Kim Young-sam emerged as the main opposition leader. Despite the effort to present the single "democratic" candidate for the 1987 presidential election, the negotiation between two politicians broke down. Kim Dae-jung and his followers split from the Reunification Democratic Party and created the Peace Democratic Party in October 29, less than 2 months before the election. Kim Dae-jung and Kim Young-sam's candidacy resulted in vote-splitting of the "Democratic" candidates, resulting in the election of Roh Tae-woo, protégé of dictator Chun Doo-hwan to take the office with 36.6% of votes.

Despite the defeat in the presidential election, the party fared well in the 1988 legislative election, coming first in the city of Seoul and dominating South-western Jeolla region, Peace Democratic Party beat Kim Young-sam's Reunification Democratic Party and emerged as the main opposition to the ruling Democratic Justice Party. However, the merger of Democratic Justice Party, Reunification Democratic Party, and New Democratic Republican Party in January 1990, forming the Democratic Liberal Party, effectively isolated Kim Dae-jung and his party in the National Assembly.

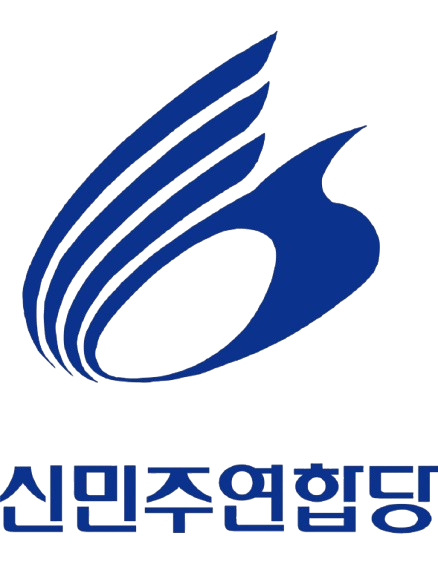
Logo of the New United Democratic Party (1991)

The party changed its name to New United Democratic Party on 14 April 1991 to contest the 1991 local election but the disappointing election result and upcoming presidential election spurred Kim Dae-jung to create a new party. Kim allied himself with the Democratic Party, who split from the Reunification Democratic Party in 1990, opposing the merger with conservative ruling Democratic Liberal Party. The merger resulted in the establishment of the Democratic Party.

== Election results ==
=== President ===
Election	Candidate	Votes	%	Result
1987	Kim Dae-jung	6,113,375	27.05	Not elected

=== Legislature ===
Election	Leader	Votes	%	Seats			Position	Status
Election	Leader	Votes	%	Constituency	Party list	Total	Position	Status
1988	Park Young-sook	3,783,279	19.26	54 / 224	16 / 75	70 / 299	2nd	Opposition

=== Local ===
Election	Metropolitan mayor/Governor	Provincial legislature	Municipal mayor	Municipal legislature
1991		165 / 868		

== See also ==
- List of political parties in South Korea
- Politics of South Korea
- Elections in South Korea
- Liberalism in South Korea
