= 1988 South Korean legislative election =

- 26 April 1988

All 299 seats to the National Assembly 150 seats needed for a majority
- Turnout: 75.77% (▼8.80pp)
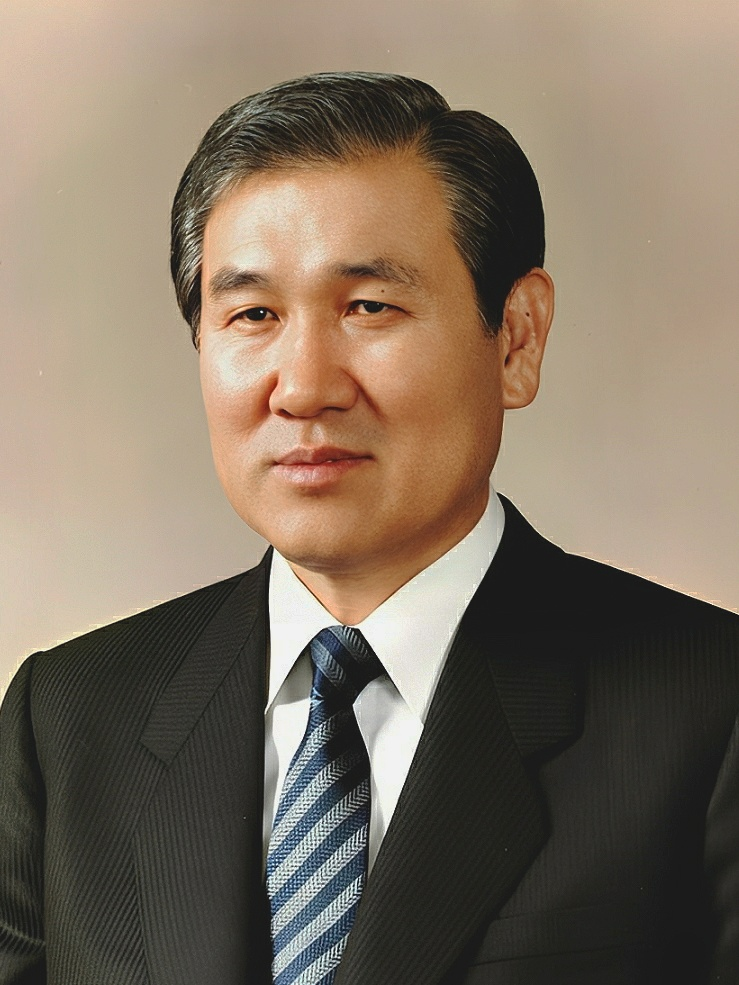

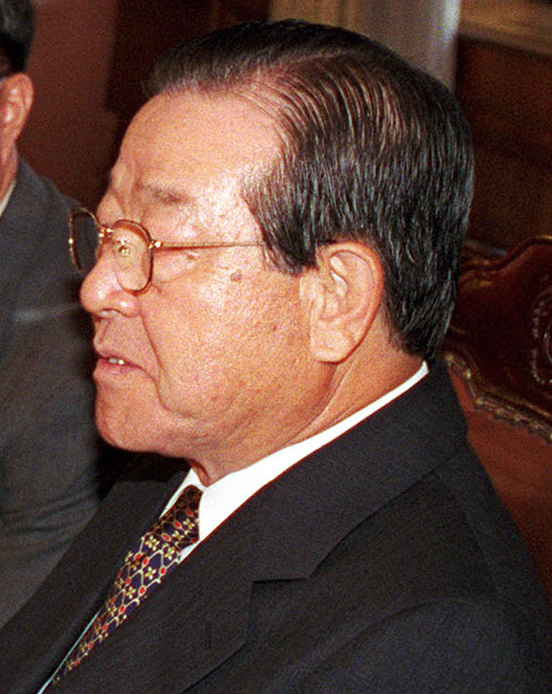
	Majority party	Minority party
Leader	Roh Tae-woo	Park Yeong-suk
Party	Democratic Justice	Peace Democratic
Last election	148 seats	Did not exist
Seats won	125	70
Seat change	▼23	New
Popular vote	6,670,494	3,783,279
Percentage	33.96%	19.26%
Swing	▼1.29pp	New
	Third party	Fourth party
Leader	Kim Myeong-yun	Kim Jong-pil
Party	Reunification Democratic	New Democratic Republican
Last election	Did not exist	Did not exist
Seats won	59	35
Seat change	New	New
Popular vote	4,680,175	3,062,506
Percentage	23.83%	15.59%
Swing	New	New
- Results of the election.
Speaker before election
Lee Jae-hyung
Democratic Justice
Elected Speaker
Kim Jae-soon
Democratic Justice

Legislative elections were held in South Korea on 26 April 1988. The result was a victory for the ruling Democratic Justice Party (DJP), which won 125 of the 299 seats in the National Assembly. Voter turnout was 75.8%. This was the first time the ruling party did not win a majority in the National Assembly since 1960, the first free and fair elections in Korean history. In January 1990, the DJP merged with other two opposition parties, leaving the Kim Dae-jung-led Peace Democratic Party to be the sole opposition party.

== Electoral system ==
Of the 299 seats, 224 were elected in single-member districts via first-past-the-post voting, while the remainder were allocated via a modified proportional representation at the national level among parties that won five or more seats in constituencies. One-half of those seats would be awarded to the top party (which was then eliminated from further consideration for national seats), with the remainder allocated based on the number of constituency seats won.

== Political parties ==
Parties	Leader	Ideology	Seats		Status
Parties	Leader	Ideology	Last election	Before election	Status
Democratic Justice Party	Roh Tae-woo	Conservatism	149 / 276	160 / 276	Government
Reunification Democratic Party	Kim Myeong-yun	Liberalism	Did not exist	50 / 276	Opposition
Peace Democratic Party	Park Yeong-suk	Liberalism	Did not exist	22 / 276	Opposition
New Democratic Republican Party	Kim Jong-pil	Conservatism	Did not exist	9 / 276	Opposition
Democratic Korea Party	Yu Chi-song	Liberalism	59 / 276	0 / 276	Opposition
New Korean Democratic Party	Shin Do-hwan	Liberalism	32 / 276	0 / 276	Opposition
Korean National Party	Lee Man-sup	Conservatism	25 / 276	0 / 276	Opposition
New Socialist Party		Socialism	1 / 276	Dissolved	Opposition
New Democratic Party	Ryu Gap-jong	Liberalism	1 / 276	Dissolved	Opposition

The governing Democratic Justice Party (DJP) had recently elected President Roh Tae-woo. While remaining the largest party, the DJP lost an absolute congressional majority. The party was hindered by a stronger opposition and the unpopularity of former party leader and President Chun Doo-hwan.

The opposition Peace Democratic Party led by veteran opposition leader Kim Dae-jung became the second largest party, winning more seats than another opposition Reunification Democratic Party (RDP). This was vindication for Kim Dae-jung, who came had come third in the 1987 South Korean presidential election. However, the election also showed the party's limitations, coming in as third place after DJP and RDP in popular vote and only winning seats in the Honam and Sudogwon, and nowhere outside of them.

For Kim Young-sam's Reunification Democratic Party the election was a major setback, winning third most seats in congress. This was after Kim had placed second in the first democratic presidential election, just ahead of Kim Dae-jung.

The New Democratic Republican Party (NDRP) led by former prime Minister Kim Jong-pil came a distant fourth. However, thanks to the failure of the DJP to win an absolute majority, the oppositions emerged as the major powerbrokers in the new National Assembly.

In January 1990, the DJP merged with the parties of Kim Young-sam and Kim Jong-pil to form the Democratic Liberal Party, with the former becoming its nominee in the 1992 presidential elections.

There were 224 constituency seats and 75 at large seats elected from lists in proportion to parties' share of constituency seats.

== Results ==
Graph of the party split among 299 seats.
Party	Votes	%	Seats			
Party	Votes	%	FPTP	List	Total	+/–
Democratic Justice Party	6,670,494	33.96	87	38	125	–23
Reunification Democratic Party	4,680,175	23.83	46	13	59	New
Peace Democratic Party	3,783,279	19.26	54	16	70	New
New Democratic Republican Party	3,062,506	15.59	27	8	35	New
Hankyoreh Democratic Party	251,236	1.28	1	0	1	New
People's Party	65,650	0.33	0	0	0	New
Korean National Party	65,032	0.33	0	0	0	–20
New Korean Democratic Party	46,877	0.24	0	0	0	–67
Democratic Korea Party	32,799	0.17	0	0	0	–35
Korean Justice Party	25,433	0.13	0	0	0	New
The Third Generation Party	16,148	0.08	0	0	0	New
Hanist Reunification Korean Party	3,736	0.02	0	0	0	New
Unificational Socialist Party	3,267	0.02	0	0	0	New
Christian Holy People's Party	2,247	0.01	0	0	0	New
Independents	933,161	4.75	9	0	9	+5
Total	19,642,040	100.00	224	75	299	+23
Valid votes	19,642,040	98.95				
Invalid/blank votes	208,775	1.05				
Total votes	19,850,815	100.00				
Registered voters/turnout	26,198,205	75.77				
Source: IPU, Nohlen et al.

=== By city/province ===
Results by city/provinces
Region	DJP		RDP		PDP		NDRP		HDP		Ind.		Total seats
Region	Seats	%	Seats	%	Seats	%	Seats	%	Seats	%	Seats	%	Total seats
Seoul	10	26.2	10	23.4	17	27.0	3	16.1	0	2.1	2	4.0	42
Busan	1	32.1	14	54.3	0	1.9	0	6.8	0	1.8	0	2.4	15
Daegu	8	48.2	0	28.4	0	0.7	0	13.2	0	1.6	0	2.5	8
Incheon	6	37.5	1	28.3	0	14.1	0	15.5	0	1.4	0	0.9	7
Gwangju	0	0.7	0	0.4	5	88.6	0	0.6	–		0	0.6	5
Gyeonggi	16	36.1	4	22.9	1	15.9	6	18.2	0	0.6	1	4.2	28
Gangwon	8	43.6	3	21.6	0	4.0	1	20.2	0	0.2	2	9.4	14
North Chungcheong	7	43.7	0	16.0	0	1.4	2	33.3	–		0	4.9	9
South Chungcheong	2	30.2	2	15.0	0	3.8	13	46.5	0	0.7	1	3.0	18
North Jeolla	0	28.8	0	1.3	14	61.5	0	2.5	0	0.3	0	4.3	14
South Jeolla	0	22.9	0	0.8	17	67.9	0	1.3	1	3.0	0	4.0	18
North Gyeongsang	17	51.0	2	24.6	0	0.9	2	16.0	0	0.8	0	6.6	21
South Gyeongsang	12	40.2	9	36.9	0	1.0	0	10.3	0	0.9	1	8.8	22
Jeju	0	36.0	1	27.1	0	6.0	0	3.4	–		2	27.4	21
Constituency total	87	34.0	46	23.8	54	19.3	27	15.6	1	1.3	9	4.8	224
PR seats	38		13		16		8		0		–		75
Total seats	125		59		70		35		1		9		299
