= Hong Sung-woo =

South Korean politician (1940–2021)

Member of the National Assembly of South Korea
- In office 12 March 1979 – 29 May 1988
- Preceded by: Goheungmun; Jeong Rae-hyuk
- Succeeded by: Shin Oh-cheol; Lee Cheol-yong
- Constituency: Dobong-gu (constituency)

Personal details
- Born: 20 February 1940 Anseong, Korea, Empire of Japan
- Died: 2 December 2021 (aged 81) Jeju City, South Korea
- Party: DRP; DJP

Hong Sung-woo (Korean: 홍성우; 20 February 1940 – 2 December 2021) was a South Korean politician. A member of the Democratic Justice Party, he served in the National Assembly from 1979 to 1988.
