= Kim Chung-rye =

South Korean politician

Kim Chung-rye was a South Korean politician.

She was appointed as Minister of Social Affairs and Health from 1982 to 1985.
