= Democratic Socialist Party (South Korea) =

1981–1982 political party in South Korea

Democratic Socialist Party 민주사회당
- Abbreviation: DSP
- Founded: 20 January 1981
- Dissolved: 28 March 1982
- Merged into: New Socialist Party

The Democratic Socialist Party (Korean: 민주사회당) was a political party in South Korea. The party was founded in 1981 and contested both the presidential and parliamentary elections that year, winning two seats in the National Assembly. It was dissolved in 1982 after merging with the New Party to found the New Socialist Party.

== Election results ==
=== Legislative elections ===
Election	Votes	%	Seats
1981	524,361	3.24%	2 / 276

=== Presidential elections ===
Election	Votes	%	Outcome
1981	825	0.01%	Eliminated in first round
