= Democratic Korea Party =

1981–1988 political party in South Korea

Democratic Korea Party 민주한국당
- Founded: 17 January 1981
- Dissolved: 29 April 1988

Party flag

The Democratic Korea Party (Korean: 민주한국당; Hanja: 民主韓國黨; RR: Minjuhangukdang, DKP) was a political party in South Korea.

== History ==
The DKP was established on 17 January 1981 following a meeting of fourteen former members of the New Democratic Party on 22 November 1980. Yu Chi-song was elected party president, and its candidate for the February 1981 presidential elections, in which he finished second to the incumbent president Chun Doo-hwan.

In the March 1981 parliamentary elections the DKP received 21.6% of the vote, winning 81 seats and emerging as the second-largest party to Chun's Democratic Justice Party. The party was widely perceived as being under the control of the Chun Doo-hwan's government to preserve the pretense of democratic competition between parties. The party was not recognised by Kim Dae-jung and Kim Young-sam as they both were barred from running elections.

In the 1985 elections the party was reduced to 35 seats. The party received just 0.2% of the vote in the 1988 elections, failing to win a seat. It was subsequently deregistered on 29 April 1988.

== Election results ==
=== National Assembly ===
Election	Leader	Votes	%	Seats				Position	Status
Election	Leader	Votes	%	Constituency	Party list	Total	+/–	Position	Status
1981	Yu Chi-song	3,495,829	21.57	57 / 184	24 / 92	81 / 276	new	2nd	Opposition
1985	Yu Chi-song	3,930,966	19.68	26 / 184	9 / 92	35 / 276	▼46	3rd	Opposition
1988	Yu Chi-song	32,799	0.17	0 / 224	0 / 75	0 / 299	▼35	9th	Extra-parliamentary
