= Korean National Party =

1981–1988 political party in South Korea

Korean National Party 한국국민당
- Founded: 23 January 1981
- Dissolved: 29 April 1988
- Succeeded by: New Democratic Republican Party (de facto; faction)
- Headquarters: Seoul

Party flag

The Korean National Party (Korean: 한국국민당; RR: Hanguk gungmindang; lit. 'Korea National Citizen's Party') was a political party in South Korea.

== History ==
The party was established on 23 January 1981 following a meeting of fifteen former MPs from the Democratic Republican Party and Yushin Political Alliance on 18 December 1980. Kim Jong-cheol was elected party president, and was selected as the party's presidential candidate for the February 1981 presidential elections; he finished third out of the four candidates with 2% of the vote.

In the March 1981 parliamentary elections the party received 13.25% of the vote, winning 25 seats and emerging as the third-largest party in parliament. The 1985 parliamentary elections saw the party's vote share reduced to 9% as it won twenty seats. When Kim Jong-pil staged a political comeback in October 1987, he founded the New Democratic Republican Party, with sixteen members defecting, eight to the New Democratic Republican Party and another eight joined the Democratic Justice Party.

The party lost all its seats in the 1988 elections, in which it received only 0.33% of the vote. As it was by law that a party failing to win a seat and receiving less than 2% of the vote in parliamentary elections would be disbanded, the party was officially dissolved on 29 April 1988.

== Election results ==
=== National Assembly ===
Election	Leader	Votes	%	Seats				Position	Status
Election	Leader	Votes	%	Constituency	Party list	Total	+/–	Position	Status
1981	Kim Jong-cheol	2,147,293	13.25	18 / 184	7 / 92	25 / 276	new	3rd	Opposition
1985	Kim Jong-cheol	1,828,744	9.16	15 / 184	5 / 92	20 / 276	▼5	4th	Opposition
1988	Lee Man-sup	65,032	0.33	0 / 224	0 / 75	0 / 299	▼20	7th	Extra-parliamentary
