= 1981 South Korean legislative election =

- 25 March 1981

All 276 seats in the National Assembly 139 seats needed for a majority
- Turnout: 77.74% (▲0.66pp)
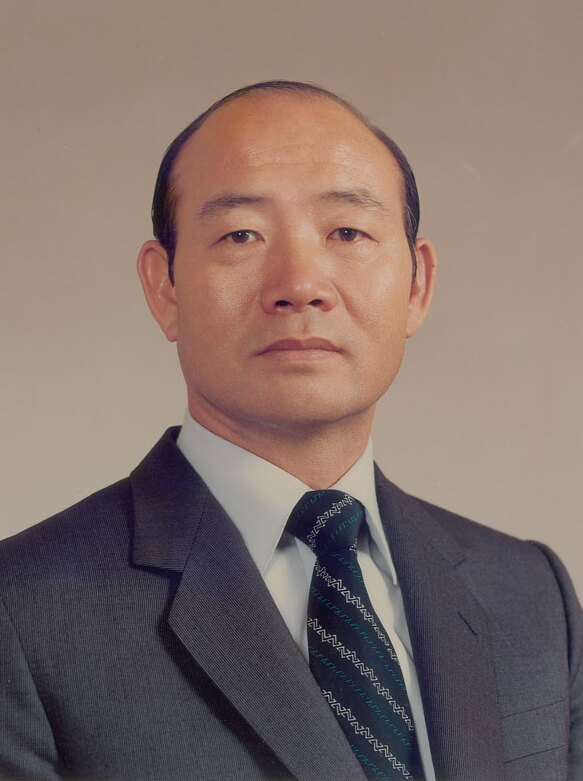

	Majority party	Minority party
Leader	Chun Doo-hwan	Yu Chi-song
Party	Democratic Justice	Democratic Korea
Seats won	151	81
Popular vote	5,776,624	3,495,829
Percentage	35.64%	21.57%
	Third party	Fourth party
Leader	Kim Jong-cheol	Kim Ui-Taek
Party	National	Civil Rights
Seats won	25	2
Popular vote	2,147,293	1,088,847
Percentage	13.25%	6.72%
Speaker before election
Dissolution of parliament
Elected Speaker
Chung Rae-hyuk
Democratic Justice

Legislative elections were held in South Korea on 25 March 1981. The elections were held following coups in 1979 and 1980, with major opposition political figures including Kim Young-sam and Kim Jong-pil barred from running and the Democratic Republican Party of late president Park Chung-hee forcibly dissolved. Kim Dae-jung was arrested on 17 May 1980, and was sentenced to death on a charge of "inciting rebellion". While ostensibly multi-party, the elections are widely considered to have been fraudulent, with opposition politicians being heavily vetted by the Agency for National Security Planning and the South Korean Army Security Command.

The result was a victory for the Democratic Justice Party, which won 151 of the 276 seats in the National Assembly. Voter turnout was 78%.

== Electoral system ==
The new electoral system for the National Assembly abolished the president's power to appoint one-third of the chamber's members. Of the 276 seats, 184 were elected in two-member constituencies via single non-transferable vote, while the remainder were allocated via modified proportional representation at the national level among parties that won five or more seats in constituencies. Two-thirds of those seats would be awarded to the top party (which was then eliminated from further consideration for national seats), with the remainder allocated based on the number of constituency seats won.

== Results ==
Graph of the party split among 276 seats.
Party	Votes	%	Seats			
Party	Votes	%	FPTP	PR	Total	+/–
Democratic Justice Party	5,776,624	35.64	90	61	151	New
Democratic Korea Party	3,495,829	21.57	57	24	81	New
Korean National Party	2,147,293	13.25	18	7	25	New
Civil Rights Party	1,088,847	6.72	2	0	2	New
New Politics Party	676,921	4.18	2	0	2	New
Democratic Socialist Party	524,361	3.24	2	0	2	New
Democratic Farmer's Party	227,715	1.41	1	0	1	New
Peaceful People Party	144,000	0.89	1	0	1	New
Socialist Party	122,778	0.76	0	0	0	New
Korea Christian Democratic Party	103,893	0.64	0	0	0	New
Unification National Group Party	87,977	0.54	0	0	0	New
Won-il Democratic Founding Party	76,863	0.47	0	0	0	New
Independents	1,734,224	10.70	11	0	11	–11
Total	16,207,325	100.00	184	92	276	+45
Valid votes	16,207,325	98.84				
Invalid/blank votes	190,520	1.16				
Total votes	16,397,845	100.00				
Registered voters/turnout	21,094,468	77.74				
Source: Nohlen et al.

=== By city/province ===
Region	Total seats	Seats won								
Region	Total seats	DJP	DKP	KNP	CRP	NPP	DSP	DFP	PPP	Ind.
Seoul	28	14	11	1	0	0	1	0	0	1
Busan	12	6	5	0	1	0	0	0	0	0
Gyeonggi	24	12	10	1	0	1	0	0	0	0
Gangwon	12	6	4	2	0	0	0	0	0	0
North Chungcheong	8	4	1	3	0	0	0	0	0	1
South Chungcheong	16	8	5	2	0	0	0	0	0	1
North Jeolla	14	7	6	0	0	0	0	0	0	0
South Jeolla	22	10	9	1	0	1	0	0	1	0
North Gyeongsang	26	13	1	5	0	0	0	0	0	3
South Gyeongsang	20	10	5	3	1	0	1	1	0	3
Jeju	2	0	0	0	0	0	0	0	0	2
Constituency total	184	90	57	18	2	2	2	1	1	11
PR list	92	61	24	7	0	0	0	0	0	0
Total	276	151	81	25	2	2	2	1	1	11
