= 1985 South Korean legislative election =

- 12 February 1985

All 276 seats to the National Assembly 139 seats needed for a majority
- Turnout: 84.57% (▲6.83pp)
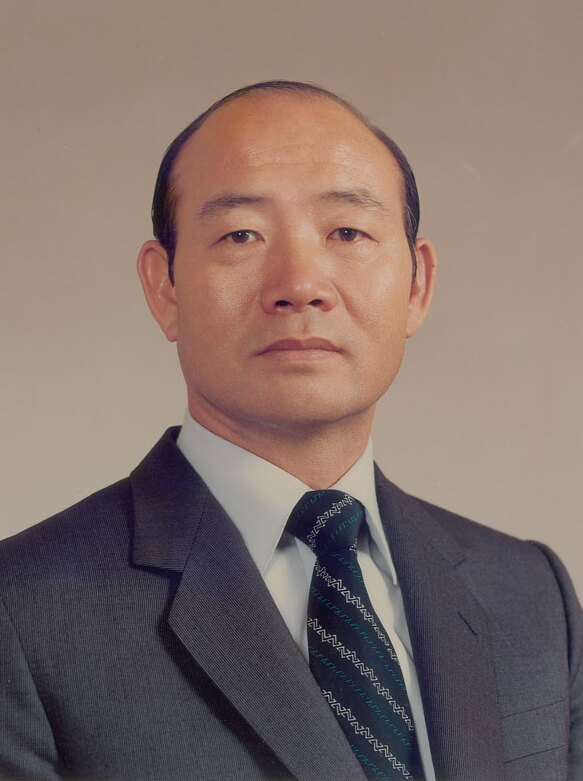

	Majority party	Minority party
Leader	Chun Doo-hwan	Lee Min-woo
Party	Democratic Justice	New Korean Democratic
Last election	151 seats	Did not exist
Seats won	148	67
Seat change	▼3	New
Popular vote	7,040,811	5,843,827
Percentage	35.25%	29.26%
Swing	▼0.39pp	New
	Third party	Fourth party
Leader	Yu Chi-song	Kim Jong-cheol
Party	Democratic Korea	National
Last election	81	25
Seats won	35	20
Seat change	▼46	▼5
Popular vote	3,930,966	1,828,744
Percentage	19.68%	9.16%
Swing	▼1.87pp	▼4.09pp
- Results by constituency
Speaker before election
Chae Mun-shik
Democratic Justice
Elected Speaker
Lee Jae-hyung
Democratic Justice

Legislative elections were held in South Korea on 12 February 1985. The result was a victory for the Democratic Justice Party, which won 148 of the 276 seats in the National Assembly. Voter turnout was 84.6%.

== Electoral system ==
Of the 276 seats, 184 were elected in two-member constituencies via single non-transferable vote, while the remainder were allocated via a modified proportional representation at the national level among parties that won five or more seats in constituencies. Two-thirds of those seats would be awarded to the top party (which was then eliminated from further consideration for national seats; see majority jackpot system), with the remainder allocated based on the number of constituency seats won.

== Political parties ==
Parties	Leader	Ideology	Seats		Status
Parties	Leader	Ideology	Last election	Before election	Status
Democratic Justice Party	Chun Doo-hwan	Conservatism	151 / 276	149 / 276	Government
Democratic Korea Party	Yu Chi-song	Liberalism	81 / 276	59 / 276	Opposition
New Korean Democratic Party	Lee Min-woo	Liberalism	Did not exist	32 / 276	Opposition
Korean National Party	Kim Jong-cheol	Conservatism	25 / 276	24 / 276	Opposition
New Socialist Party			2 / 276 (Note: New Politics Party)	1 / 276	Opposition
New Socialist Party			2 / 276 (Note: Democratic Socialist Party)	1 / 276	Opposition
Civil Rights Party			2 / 276	0 / 276	Opposition
Democratic Farmer's Party			1 / 276	Dissolved	Opposition
Liberal National Party			1 / 276 (Note: as Peaceful People Party)	0 / 276	Opposition

The ruling Democratic Justice Party (DJP) of President Chun Doo-hwan managed to remain the largest party in the National Assembly but faced a tougher challenge from the united opposition.

The New Korean Democratic Party (NKDP) was formed by former members of the New Democratic Party, notably opposition leaders Kim Dae-jung and Kim Young-sam despite being still barred from running. The party made strong gains across the country, largely thanks to its focus on greater democratic rights.

The Korean National Party had been formed by former members of the Democratic Republican Party in the run-up to the 1981 elections. After making some key gains, the party lost ground in these elections, largely thanks to the gains of the NKDP.

The opposition Democratic Korea Party had been the premier opposition party following the 1981 elections, but it suffered major defections to the NKDP.

== Results ==
Graph of the party split among 276 seats.
Party	Votes	%	Seats			
Party	Votes	%	FPTP	PR	Total	+/–
Democratic Justice Party	7,040,811	35.25	87	61	148	–3
New Korean Democratic Party	5,843,827	29.26	50	17	67	New
Democratic Korea Party	3,930,966	19.68	26	9	35	–46
Korean National Party	1,828,744	9.16	15	5	20	–5
New Socialist Party	288,863	1.45	1	0	1	New
Workers and Farmers Party	185,859	0.93	0	0	0	New
New Democratic Party	112,654	0.56	1	0	1	New
Civil Rights Party	75,634	0.38	0	0	0	–2
National Group Party	17,257	0.09	0	0	0	New
Independents	650,028	3.25	4	0	4	–7
Total	19,974,643	100.00	184	92	276	0
Valid votes	19,974,643	98.46				
Invalid/blank votes	312,029	1.54				
Total votes	20,286,672	100.00				
Registered voters/turnout	23,987,830	84.57				
Source: Nohlen et al.

=== By city/province ===
Region	Total seats	Seats won						
Region	Total seats	DJP	NKDP	DKP	KNP	NSP	NDP	Ind.
Seoul	28	13	14	1	0	0	0	0
Busan	12	3	6	2	1	0	0	0
Daegu	6	2	2	1	1	0	0	0
Incheon	4	2	2	0	0	0	0	0
Gyeonggi	20	10	4	3	3	0	0	0
Gangwon	12	6	0	1	4	0	0	1
North Chungcheong	8	4	2	1	1	0	0	0
South Chungcheong	16	8	4	4	0	0	0	0
North Jeolla	14	7	2	1	3	0	1	0
South Jeolla	22	11	5	5	0	1	0	0
North Gyeongsang	20	10	4	3	1	0	0	2
South Gyeongsang	20	10	5	4	1	0	0	0
Jeju	2	1	0	0	0	0	0	1
Constituency total	184	87	50	26	15	1	1	4
PR list	92	61	17	9	5	0	0	0
Total	276	148	67	35	20	1	1	4
