= Democratic Justice Party =

1981–1990 political party in South Korea

Democratic Justice Party 민주정의당 民主正義黨
- Leader: Chun Doo-hwan (1981–1985); Roh Tae-woo (1985–1990)
- Founder: Chun Doo-hwan
- Founded: 15 January 1981
- Dissolved: 22 January 1990
- Preceded by: Democratic Republican Party (de facto) (factions)
- Merged into: Democratic Liberal Party
- Headquarters: Seoul
- Ideology: Conservatism (South Korean); Militarism; Neoliberalism; Nationalism (South Korean); Anti-communism; 1981–1987: Authoritarianism; State-led development
- Political position: Right-wing; 1981–1987: Far-right
- National affiliation: Hanahoe
- Colours: Sky blue; Before 1987: Dark blue

Party flag
- Until 1987 From 1987

- Democratic Justice Party
- Hangul: 민주정의당
- Hanja: 民主正義黨
- Revised Romanization: Minjujeonguidang
- McCune–Reischauer: Minjuchŏngŭidang

The Democratic Justice Party (DJP; Korean: 민주정의당; RR: Minjujeonguidang) was the ruling party of South Korea from 1981 to 1990.

== History ==
Chun Doo-hwan had become the country's de facto leader after leading a military coup in December 1979, and was elected president in his own right in August 1980. Two months after taking office, he abolished all political parties, including Park Chung Hee's Democratic Republican Party, which had ruled the country since 1963, and with few viable constraints on its power since Park's self-coup of 1971. A new Constitution, which inaugurated the Fifth Republic, was enacted later in October.

The following January, Chun created the Democratic Justice Party, which garnered the support of most DRP lawmakers and politicians; for all intents and purposes it was the DRP under a new name. He was elected as the first president of the Fifth Republic in 1981. Although the DJP won large majorities at legislative elections in 1981 and 1985 and the system was heavily rigged in its favor, it had far less power than the DRP.

The 1980 Constitution limited the president to a single seven-year term, with no possibility of reelection. Chun announced his retirement in 1987, but resisted all calls to further open up the regime. The situation changed later in 1987, when DJP presidential candidate Roh Tae-woo promised that year's presidential election would be free and democratic. Roh became the first direct elected president under a free and fair election in December 1987. In 1990, the DJP merged with Kim Young-Sam's Reunification Democratic Party and Kim Jong-pil's New Democratic Republican Party to form the Democratic Liberal Party.

== Ideologies ==
At its founding convention held on 15 January 1981, the Democratic Justice Party presented five principles as its official founding ideology: nation, democracy, justice, welfare, and peaceful unification. The party embraced various ideologies like National conservatism, State-led developmentalism, Market liberalism, Neoliberalism, Economic liberalization, Anti-communism, Social justice and Authoritarianism (until 1987).

== Election results ==
=== President ===
| Election | Candidate | Votes | % | Result |
|---|---|---|---|---|
| 1981 | Chun Doo-hwan | 4,755 | 90.23 | Elected |
| 1987 | Roh Tae-woo | 8,282,738 | 36.64 | Elected |

=== Legislature ===
| Election | Leader | Votes | % | Seats | | | | Position | Status |
| Election | Leader | Votes | % | Constituency | Party list | Total | +/– | Position | Status |
|---|---|---|---|---|---|---|---|---|---|
| 1981 | Chun Doo-hwan | 5,776,624 | 35.64 | 90 / 184 | 61 / 92 | 151 / 276 | new | 1st | Government |
| 1985 | Chun Doo-hwan | 7,040,811 | 35.25 | 87 / 184 | 61 / 92 | 148 / 276 | ▼3 | 1st | Government |
| 1988 | Roh Tae-woo | 6,675,494 | 33.96 | 87 / 224 | 38 / 75 | 125 / 299 | ▼23 | 1st | Government |
