= Liberalism in South Korea =

This article gives an overview of liberalism in South Korea and its related history. It is limited to liberal parties with substantial support and representation in the National Assembly.

Historically, liberalism in South Korea emerged as an anti-military dictatorship movement. In contemporary South Korean politics, it represents a movement positioned opposite the conservatives. Liberal political parties include the Democratic Party of Korea and the Justice Party.

The Democratic Party of Korea is a reformist party and internationally considered centrist to center-left. Although it is usually classified as a center-left party within South Korea, some studies consider its social policies more conservative than center-right parties in Western Europe such as Christian Democratic Union of Germany. The Justice Party is to the left of the DPK but takes a more moderate stance than the far-left parties of Western Europe.

South Korean liberals tend to unite around several key issues: a conciliatory approach to North Korea, reparations for Japanese colonial rule, and, wherever possible, autonomy from interference by major powers, including the United States. South Korean liberalism is also based on a national liberalist independence movement against Japan. South Korean liberals support the Sunshine Policy toward North Korea.

== Introduction ==
In South Korea, the term "liberalism" generally refers to classical liberalism. (Note: In South Korea, the term "liberal" (자유 or 자유주의) used in the media and the term "liberal" used by politicians and the public are very different in context. "Liberal" in South Korean media usually means "liberal" in the sense of the United States or Europe, but "liberal" in South Korean politicians and the public usually means a form of politics close to the right, such as economic liberal and anti-communist.) In South Korea, the labels "liberal" (자유주의자; Jayujuuija; chayujuŭija) and "liberal democracy" (자유민주주의; 自由民主主義; Jayuminjujuui) are often claimed by conservatives to denote economic liberalism and anti-communism. (Note: Conservative parties in South Korea often put "liberal" (자유) in their party names. (Example: Liberal Party, Democratic Liberal Party, United Liberal Democrats, Liberty Korea Party, etc.)) Liberals, particularly those with left-leaning views, often use terms like "democrats", "ribuhruhl" (리버럴, the Korean pronunciation of "liberal") or "democratic camp" (민주진영) to set themselves apart from conservatives.

In South Korea, liberals and progressives are political forces with individual traditions, but American liberalism is often translated as progressivism in the Korean language. The Justice Party officially supports social democracy, but since it is a party that inherited the political stake of the Uri Party, it is regarded as part of the South Korean progressive political party tradition and at the same time as part of the liberal political party tradition.

In South Korea, the terms "liberal," "liberty," "libertarian," and "freedom" all tend to be translated into Jayu (자유; 自由). For example, in South Korea, both Canada's "Liberal Party", Netherlands' "Party for Freedom" and the United States' "Libertarian Party" are read as Jayudang (자유당; 自由黨) in Korean. Also, right-wing socially conservative media in South Korea regard the American tradition of right-libertarianism as progressive because it is culturally liberal.

The main diplomatic point that defines liberalism in South Korea is "independence" (독립). South Korean liberals have a more nationalistic nature based on anti-imperialism in matters related to international affairs. The anti-China Gaehwa Party / Independence Club at the end of the 19th century, and the anti-Japan Korean independence movement during the Japanese colonial era, formed Korea's early liberalism. On the other hand, Korea's conservative elites cooperated with neighboring powers such as Qing China and Japan for practical reasons. South Korean leftists saw North Korea's Juche policy, grounded in Korean Confucianism, as a more genuinely Korean alternative to a socialist state defined only by that binary, believing it would preserve independence and avoid becoming a subordinate state to great powers. In modern South Korean politics, socialism and anti-Americanism, which were by-products alongside the rise of democratic movements were thoroughly suppressed with force by conservatives with the support of the United States, which made liberals resent domestic interference by foreign powers. Thus, while they maintain cordial relations with the United States, they also seek to exercise strategic autonomy in its foreign policy.

South Korean liberals tends to take a nuanced and pragmatic stance towards China and Russia, preferring cooperation to promote peace on the peninsula. Thus, they tend to be more reluctant to take a strong stance on controversial issues such as the issue of Taiwan and disputes in the South China Sea. On the campaign trail, Lee Jae-myung questioned South Korean relevance in the Taiwan Strait issue. President Moon Jae-in stated that South Korea will not take sides in the US-China rivalry.

South Korean liberals have represented Korean victims of Japanese war crimes since the 1990s. They oppose any agreement or cooperation with Japan until the Japanese government issues formal apologies to Korean victims and demonstrate sincere reflections on the horrors of the Japanese occupation of Korea. President Moon Jae-in stated the human rights of victims are more important than relations between countries.

South Korean major liberals mainly criticize mainstream conservatives, distancing themselves from any heritage and relationship with the military dictatorship, insist on political reform and the rule of law, supporting the foreign policy of reconciliation with North Korea. Domestically, they advocated the reform of the monopoly of the large industrial conglomerates known as chaebols. They also proposed the curtailing of investigative powers of the prosecutor's office, with such powers transferred to the police, as they viewed them as powerful political tools.

== History ==
During the colonial period, Marxist historian Paek Nam-un evaluated Silhak as "pioneer of early modern period liberalism," while Ahn Jae-hong, a liberal nationalist, evaluated Silhak and Silhak scholar Chŏng Yagyong as "the origin of late modern period liberalism by presenting elimination of (feudal) class and support for equality". Silhak criticized the existing Confucian conservatism and Sadaejuui, aiming for political reform and pragmatism, and also argued for the superiority of Western science and technology as well as Westernization. Some Silhak scholars believed in Christianity while other liberal nationalists turned towards neo-Confucian Donghak ideology, which provided these nationalists with a powerful blueprint for mass mobilization, popular sovereignty, and self-reliance.

Korea's first classical liberal and Enlightenmentists party was the Gaehwa Party, which appeared in 1874. They aimed for radical political and social reform, cut off unequal relations with the powerful Qing Dynasty and tried to create a completely independent Joseon Dynasty, and led by Seo Jae-pil in 1896 was a practical successor to the Gaehwa Party. Influenced by Japanese liberalism, they showed pro-Japanese tendencies, but at the same time insisted on independent Korea. In the 1900s, classical liberals and Enlightenmentists in Korea were largely divided into two groups. Some became Chinilpa who cooperated with Japan, and others who devoted themselves to the Korean independence movement.

During the colonial era, Korean liberalism is closely related to the Korean independence movement. South Korean historians say that the March 1st Movement, which took place in 1919, affected democracy and liberalism in South Korea as a movement involving many Koreans regardless of gender, religion, or occupation. The Republic of Korean Provisional Government, formed after the March 1st Movement, built a modern national system by separating the powers of government, parliament, and judiciary and introducing universal elections that included women. (However, since it was located in Shanghai, China, it was more of a Korean independence movement organization than a korean government.)

After the end of Japanese colonial rule, with the inauguration of the Republic of Korea government, the word "liberal" has been used in South Korea for a while in a similar sense to anti-communism and anti-socialism. That is why not only ideological liberals but also hard-line conservatives and far-right anti-communists called themselves "liberal." A case in point was the "Liberal Party", a South Korean far-right national-conservative party influenced by Shōwa Statism, German and Italian fascism. In particular, Syngman Rhee, the first president of the Liberal Party, committed authoritarian rule and election fraud based on Ilminism, an anti-liberal individual worship ideology from 1948 to 1960, and liberals and students who opposed it caused April Revolution. This was the first successful liberal revolution in South Korea.

The 1997 presidential election saw the election of South Korea's first liberal president in modern history, with Kim Dae-jung serving as the country's leader from 1998 to 2003. Later liberal presidents would include Roh Moo-hyun from 2003 to 2008, Moon Jae-in from 2017 to 2022, and Lee Jae Myung since 2025.

== Liberal parties ==
The political party that once were ruling party are in bold.

=== Before 1945 ===
- Gaehwa Party
- Independence Club
- New People's Association
- Korean Provisional Government

=== Minjudangkye tradition ===
In South Korea, South Korean's unique liberal and korean nationalist parties are often referred to as Minjudangkye parties (Korean: 민주당계 정당; Hanja: 民主黨系政黨; lit. 'Democratic-line political parties'). In South Korea, usually "liberal" political parties mean "Minjudangkye" parties.

==== Mainstream parties ====
- Christian Social Democratic Party → Korea Democratic Party (1945–1949)
- Democratic Nationalist Party (1949–1955)
- **Democratic Party** (1955–1961; Governing period: 1960–1961)
- **New Democratic Party → Civil Rights Party → Civilian's Party** (1960–1967; Governing period: 1961–1962)
- New Democratic Party (1967–1980)
- Democratic Korea Party (1981–1988)
  - New Korean Democratic Party → Reunification Democratic Party (1985–1990)
- New Korean Democratic Party (1984–1988)
- Peace Democratic Party → New Democratic Unionist Party (1987–1991)
- Reunification Democratic Party (1987–1990)
- Democratic Party (1991–1995)
- **Democratic Party → National Congress for New Politics** (1995–2000; Governing period: 1998–2000)
- **Millennium Democratic Party → Democratic Party** (2000–2008; Governing period: 2000–2003)
- **Uri Party** (2002–2007; Governing period: 2004–2007)
- **Grand Unified Democratic New Party** (2007–2008; Governing period: 2007-2008)
- United Democratic Party → Democratic Party (2008–2011)
- Democratic United Party → Democratic Party (2011–2014)
- **New Politics Alliance for Democracy → Minjoo Party → Democratic Party** (since 2014; Governing period: 2017–2022; since 2025)
  - Platform Party (satellite party for the 2020 election)
  - People's Party (2016–2018, splinter party)
  - Bareunmirae Party (2018–2020, splinter party)
  - Minsaeng Party (since 2020, splinter party)
  - Democratic Alliance of Korea (satellite party for the 2024 election)
  - Korea Innovation Party (since 2024. splinter party)
  - New Future Party (since 2024. splinter party)
  - Pine Tree Party (since 2024. splinter party)

==== Minor parties ====
- Democratic Party (1963–1965)
- Liberal Democratic Party (1963–1965)
- National Party (1971)
- Democratic Unification Party (1973–1980)
- Civil Rights Party (1981–1985)
- New Democratic Party (1985)
- Hankyoreh Democratic Party (1988–1991)
- Democratic Party (1990–1991)
- Democratic Party (1995–1997)
- Democratic Party (2007–2008)
- The Participation Party (2010–2011)
- Peace Democratic Party → People's Happiness Party (2010–2012)
- Real Democratic Party (2012)
- New Political Vision Party (2014)
- Minjoo Party (2014–2016)
- Party for Democracy and Peace (2018–2020)

- New Alternatives (2020)

- Open Democratic Party (2020–2022)
- Future Democratic Party (2020)
- Platform Party (2020)
  - Transition Korea (since 2020)
  - Basic Income Party (since 2020)
- New Wave (2021–2022)
- Popular Democratic Party (2024–2026)

=== Non-Minjudangkye ===
In South Korea, these political parties are not often referred to as general "liberal" in Korean language, but in an international context, they are referred to as "liberal" political parties.

- Progressive Party (1956–1958)
- Creative Korea Party (2007–2012)
- Unified Progressive Party (2011-2012) (Note: Since 2012, American-style left-liberals (social liberals and some social democrats) within the UPP have fled in large quantities, and far-left (anti-Americanists or left-wing nationalists) have since become the main players.)
- People Party (2016–2018)
- Korean Welfare Party (since 2016)
- Grand National Unity Party (2017–2018)
- Bareunmirae Party (2018–2020)
- Justice Party (since 2012)
- Dawn of Liberty Party (since 2019) (Note: Dawn of Liberty Party is a far-right party aimed at 'alt-right', but it is often described as a "liberal" or "right-liberal" party in the South Korean media because it rejects Confucian conservatism and advocates Western-style classical liberalism.)
- Transition Korea (since 2020)
- Basic Income Party (since 2020)
- People Party (2020–2022)
- Minsaeng Party (since 2020)

== Liberal media in South Korea ==
- Hankook Ilbo - centrist, classically liberal
  - The Korea Times (English-language newspapers)
- Kyunghyang Shinmun - centre to centre-left, liberal
- The Hankyoreh - centre-left, socially liberal
  - Cine21 (film magazine)
- OhmyNews - liberal-leaning, progressive liberal

== Liberal organizations ==
In South Korea, 'political liberalism' and 'non-political liberalism' are distinguished. Therefore, the groups listed below may not be directly related to a particular political party or political power.

=== Civil rights organizations ===
- ASUNARO: Action for Youth Rights of Korea - Student rights
- Chingusai - LGBT rights
- Solidarity Against Disability Discrimination - Disability rights
- Solidarity for LGBT Human Rights of Korea - LGBT rights

=== Labour organizations ===
- Federation of Korean Trade Unions
- Korean Confederation of Trade Unions (factions) - There are also non-liberal/socialists within the KCTU.
  - Korean Teachers and Education Workers Union (factions)

=== Nationalist (liberal-nationalist) organizations ===
- Voluntary Agency Network of Korea

=== Libertarian organizations ===
South Korean libertarians define themselves as Jayujuuija (자유주의자). But South Korean center-left liberals also define themselves as Jayujuuija, so it is important in what context the South Korean political term is used

- Center for Free Enterprise - libertarian/conservative

=== Other ===
- Korea Democracy Foundation
- Minbyun

== Liberal presidents in South Korea ==
- Yun Bo-seon (Democratic) (1960–1962)
- Kim Dae-jung (National Congress for New Politics→Millennium Democratic Party) (1998–2003)
- Roh Moo-hyun (Millennium Democratic Party→Uri Party→United New Democratic Party) (2003–2008)
- Moon Jae-in (Democratic) (2017–2022)
- Lee Jae-myung (Democratic) (2025–present)

== Major liberal parties election results of South Korea ==
=== Presidential elections ===
Election	Candidate	Total votes	Share of votes	Outcome	Party name
1952	Yi Si-yeong	764,715	10.9%	Defeated ✗	Democratic National Party
1956	Shin Ik-hee	0	0.0%	died before election	Democratic Party (1955)
March 1960	Chough Pyung-ok	0 (electoral vote)	0.0%	died before election	Democratic Party (1955)
August 1960	Yun Bo-seon	208 (electoral vote)	82.2%	Elected ✓	Democratic Party (1955)
1963	Yun Bo-seon	4,546,614	45.1%	Defeated ✗	Civil Rule Party
1967	Yun Bo-seon	4,526,541	40.9%	Defeated ✗	New Democratic Party
1971	Kim Dae-jung	5,395,900	45.3%	Defeated ✗	New Democratic Party
1981	Yu Chi-song	1,778,007 (College election); 404 (electoral vote)	11.7% 7.7%	Defeated ✗	Democratic Korea Party
1987	Kim Dae-jung	6,113,375	27.0%	Defeated ✗	Peace Democratic Party
1987	Kim Young-sam	6,337,581	28.0%	Defeated ✗	Reunification Democratic Party
1992	Kim Dae-jung	8,041,284	33.8%	Defeated ✗	Democratic Party (1991)
1997	Kim Dae-jung	10,326,275	40.3%	Elected ✓	National Congress for New Politics
2002	Roh Moo-hyun	12,014,277	48.9%	Elected ✓	Millennium Democratic Party
2007	Chung Dong-young	6,174,681	26.1%	Defeated ✗	United New Democratic Party
2012	Moon Jae-in	14,692,632	48.0%	Defeated ✗	Democratic United Party
2017	Moon Jae-in	13,423,800	41.1%	Elected ✓	Democratic Party of Korea
2022	Lee Jae-myung	16,147,738	47.8%	Defeated ✗	Democratic Party of Korea
2025	Lee Jae-myung	17,287,513	49.4%	Elected ✓	Democratic Party of Korea

=== Legislative elections ===
View source data.

Election	Total seats won	Total votes	Share of votes	Outcome of election	Status	Election leader	Party name
1948	29 / 200	916,322	13.5%	new 29 seats; Minority	in opposition	Kim Seong-su	Korea Democratic Party
1950	24 / 210	683,910	9.8%	new 24 seats; Minority	in opposition	Shin Ik-hee	Democratic National Party
1954	15 / 203	593,499	7.9%	▼9 seats; Minority	in opposition	Shin Ik-hee	Democratic National Party
1958	79 / 233	2,914,049	34.0%	new 79 seats; Minority	in opposition	Chough Pyung-ok	Democratic Party (1955)
1960	175 / 233	3,786,401	41.7%	▲96 seats; Majority	in government	Chough Pyung-ok	Democratic Party (1955)
1963	41 / 175	1,870,976	20.1%	new 41 seats; Minority	in opposition	Yun Bo-seon	Civil Rule Party
1963	13 / 175	1,264,285	13.6%	new 14 seats; Minority	in opposition	Park Soon-cheon	Democratic Party (1963)
1963	2 / 175	822,000	8.8%	new 2 seats; Minority	in opposition	Ho Chong	People's Party
1967	45 / 175	3,554,224	32.7%	new 45 seats; Minority	in opposition	Yu Jin-o	New Democratic Party
1967	0 / 175	323,203	3.0%	▼13 seats; extra-parliamentary	in opposition		Democratic Party (1963)
1971	89 / 204	4,969,050	44.4%	▲44 seats; Minority	in opposition	Kim Hong-il	New Democratic Party
1971	1 / 175	454,257	4.1%	new 1 seats; Minority	in opposition	Yun Po-sun	National Party
1973	52 / 219	3,577,300	32.5%	▼37 seats; Minority	in opposition	Yu Chin-san	New Democratic Party
1973	2 / 219	3,577,300	10.4%	new seats; Minority	in opposition	Yang Il-dong	Democratic Unification Party
1978	61 / 231	4,861,204	32.8%	▲9 seats; Minority	in opposition	Yi Cheol-seung	New Democratic Party
1978	3 / 231	1,095,057	7.4%	new1 seats; Minority	in opposition	Yang Il-dong	Democratic Unification Party
1981	81 / 276	3,495,829	21.6%	new 81 seats; Minority	in opposition	Yu Chi-song	Democratic Korea Party
1981	2 / 276	1,088,847	6.7%	new 2 seats; Minority	in opposition		Civil Rights Party
1985	67 / 276	5,843,827	29.3%	new 67 seats; Minority	in opposition	Lee Min-woo	New Korean Democratic Party
1985	35 / 276	3,930,966	19.7%	▼46 seats; Minority	in opposition	Yu Chi-song	Democratic Korea Party
1985	1 / 276	3,930,966	19.7%	new 1 seats; Minority	in opposition	Gap-jong Yu	New Democratic Party
1985	0 / 276	112,654	0.6%	▼2 seats; extra-parliamentary	in opposition		Civil Rights Party
1988	59 / 299	4,680,175	23.8%	new 59 seats; in Coalition (PPD-DRP-NDRP)	in opposition	Kim Myeong-yun	Reunification Democratic Party
1988	70 / 276	3,783,279	19.3%	new 70 seats; in Coalition (PPD-DRP-NDRP)	in opposition	Park Yeong-suk	Peace Democratic Party
1988	1 / 175	251,236	1.3%	new 1 seats; Minority	in opposition	Ye Chun-ho	Hankyoreh Democratic Party
1988	0 / 175	79,676: NKDP: 46,877; DKP: 32,799	0.4%	extra-parliamentary	in opposition	–	Others
1992	97 / 299	6,004,577	29.2%	new 97 seats; Minority	in opposition	Kim Dae-jung	Democratic Party (1991)
1996	79 / 299	4,971,961	25.3%	new 79 seats; in Coalition (NCNP-ULD-Democrats)	in opposition (1996-1998)	Kim Dae-jung	National Congress for New Politics
1996	79 / 299	4,971,961	25.3%	new 79 seats; in Coalition (NCNP-ULD-Democrats)	in government (1998-2000)	Kim Dae-jung	National Congress for New Politics
1996	15 / 276	2,207,695	11.2%	new 15 seats; Minority	in opposition	Chang Eul-byung	United Democratic Party
2000	115 / 299	6,780,625	35.9%	new 115 seats; in Coalition (MDP-ULD-DPP)	in government	Kim Dae-jung	Millennium Democratic Party
2004	152 / 299	8,145,824	38.3%	new 152 seats; Majority	in government	Chung Dong-young	Uri Party
2004	9 / 299	1,510,178	7.1%	▼53 seats; Minority	in government	Choug Soon-hyung	Millennium Democratic Party
2008	81 / 299	4,313,111	25.1%	new 81 seats; Minority	in opposition	Son Hak-gyu	United Democratic Party
2008	3 / 299	651,993	3.8%	new 3 seats; Minority	in opposition	Moon Kook-hyun	Creative Korea Party
2012	127 / 300	7,777,123	36.5%	new 127 seats; Minority	in opposition	Han Myeong-sook	Democratic United Party
2012	0 / 299	91,935	0.4%	▼3 seats; extra-parliamentary	in opposition	Moon Kook-hyun	Creative Korea Party
2012	0 / 299	48,648	0.2%	new 0 seats; extra-parliamentary	in opposition	Han Kwang-ok	Real Democratic Party
2016	123 / 300	6,069,744	25.5%	new 123 seats; Plurality	in opposition (2016-2017)	Kim Chong-in	Democratic Party
2016	123 / 300	6,069,744	25.5%	new 123 seats; Plurality	in government (2017-2020)	Kim Chong-in	Democratic Party
2016	38 / 300	6,355,572	26.7%	new 38 seats; Minority	in opposition	Ahn Cheol-soo	People's Party
2016	6 / 300	1,719,891 (Party-list PR)	7.23% (Party-list PR)	new 6 seats; Minority	in opposition	Sim Sang-jung	Justice Party
2016	0 / 300	209,872 (Party-list PR)	0.88% (Party-list PR)	extra-parliamentary	in opposition	Shin Ki-nam	Democratic Party
2020	180 / 300	14,345,425 (Constituency); 9,307,112 (Party-list PR)	49.9% (Constituency); 33.4% (Party-list PR)	▲52 seats; Majority	in government	Lee Hae-chan	Democratic Party (Constituency); Platform Party (Party-list PR)
2020	6 / 300	2,697,956 (Party-list PR)	9.7% (Party-list PR)	6 seats; Minority	in opposition	Sim Sang-jung	Justice Party
2020	3 / 300	1,896,719 (Party-list PR)	6.8% (Party-list PR)	new 3 seats; Minority	in opposition	Ahn Cheol-soo	People Party
2020	3 / 300	1,512,763 (Party-list PR)	5.4% (Party-list PR)	new 3 seats; Minority	in opposition	Lee Keun-shik	Open Democratic Party
2020	0 / 175	415,473 (FPTP); 830,075 (PR): Minsaeng: 758,778 (PR)/415,473 (FPTP); FDP: 71,297 (PR)	1.45% (Constituency); 2.98% (Party-list PR)	extra-parliamentary	in opposition	–	Others
2024	175 / 300	14,758,083 (Constituency); 7,567,459 (Party-list PR)	51.2% (Constituency); 26.7% (Party-list PR)	▼5 seats; Majority	in opposition	Lee Jae-myung	Democratic Party (Constituency); Democratic Alliance (Party-list PR) (Note: Including candidates from Progressive Party, Basic Income Party, Open Democratic Party and Social Democratic Party)
2024	12 / 300	6,874,278 (Party-list PR)	24.3% (Party-list PR)	new 12 seats; Minority	in opposition	Cho Kuk	Rebuilding Korea Party
2024	0 / 300	609,313 (Party-list PR)	2.1% (Party-list PR)	▼6 seats; extra-parliamentary	in opposition	Sim Sang-jung	Green–Justice Party
2024	3 / 300	483,827 (Party-list PR)	1.7% (Party-list PR)	new 1 seats; Minority	in opposition	Lee Nak-yon	New Future Party
2024	0 / 175	19,714 (FPTP); 130,984 (PR): PTP: 124,369 (PR)/18,939 (FPTP); CPLP: 6,615 (PR)/778 (FPTP)	0.07% (Constituency); 0.46% (Party-list PR)	extra-parliamentary	in opposition	–	Others

=== Local elections ===
Election	Metropolitan mayor/Governor	Provincial legislature	Municipal mayor	Municipal legislature	Party name
1995	4 / 15	353 / 875	84 / 230		Democratic Party (1991)
1998	6 / 16	271 / 616	84 / 232		National Congress for New Politics
1998	0 / 16	0 / 616	1 / 232		New People Party
2002	4 / 16	33 / 682	16 / 227		Millennium Democratic Party
2006	1 / 16	52 / 733	19 / 230	630 / 2,888	Uri Party
2006	2 / 16	80 / 733	20 / 230	276 / 2,888	Democratic Party (2005)
2010	8 / 16	360 / 761	92 / 228	1,025 / 2,888	Democratic Party (2008)
2014	9 / 17	349 / 789	80 / 226	1,157 / 2,898	New Politics Alliance for Democracy
2018	14 / 17	647 / 824	151 / 226	1,638 / 2,927	Democratic Party of Korea
2022	5 / 17	322 / 872	63 / 226	1,384 / 2,987	Democratic Party of Korea
2022	12 / 16	589 / 933	119 / 227	1,574 / 3,035	Democratic Party of Korea

== See also ==
- 386 Generation
- Anti-sadaejuui
- Classical liberalism
- Conservatism in South Korea
- Conservative liberalism (centre to centre-right)
- Economic liberalism
- Economic progressivism
- History of South Korea
- Liberalism in Japan - This influenced the formation of early Korean liberalism.
- List of political parties in South Korea
- Minjudang
- Politics of South Korea
- Progressivism in South Korea
- Social conservatism
- Social liberalism (centre-left)
- Social democracy (centre-left to left-wing)
- Student movements in Korea
- Sunshine policy
- Undongkwon
