= Yu Chi-song =

South Korean politician (1924–2006)

Member of the National Assembly
- In office 17 December 1963 – 30 June 1967
- In office 12 March 1973 – 29 May 1988

Leader of the Democratic Korea Party
- In office 17 January 1981 – 29 March 1985
- Preceded by: Position Established
- Succeeded by: Jo Yunh-yeong
- In office 12 September 1985 – 29 April 1988
- Preceded by: Kim Jun-seob (Acting)
- Succeeded by: Position Abolished

12th President of the Korean Constitutional Association
- In office April 2001 – March 2003
- Preceded by: Chae Mun-sik
- Succeeded by: Jang Gyeong-sun

Personal details
- Born: 7 October 1924 Pyeongtaek, Empire of Japan
- Died: 2 June 2006 (age 81) Seoul, South Korea
- Party: Democratic Party of Korea (1955–1963); Civil Rule Party (1963–1981); Democratic Korea Party (1981–1988)
- Education: Seoul National University

Yu Chi-song (Korean: 유치송; Hanja: 柳致松; 7 October 1924 – 2 June 2006) was a South Korean politician who served in the National Assembly and was the Democratic Korea Party candidate for President in the 1981 election.

== Early life ==
Yu was born in Pyeongtaek, Korea, Empire of Japan, on 7 October 1924. He worked as the secretary to National Assembly Speaker Sin Ik-hui in 1948 and graduated from Seoul National University in 1952, earning a Bachelor of Economics.

== Career ==
Yu participated in the founding of the Democratic Party of Korea in 1955 and held several positions within the party. Yu ran for political office during the 1963 legislative election, winning a seat in the National Assembly for the Civil Rule Party. Yu sought re-election in 1967, this time running on the New Democratic Party ticket, but lost his seat. He ran for his old seat again in the 1971 election, but lost again. Yu returned yet again for his National Assembly seat in the 1973 election on the New Democratic ticket, this time succeeding in his effort. The following year, Yu became the party's Secretary-General and he went on to win re-election in 1978.

1981 South Korean presidential election results.

In 1981, Yu was among the founders of the Democratic Korea Party and was elected Party President. Yu thus became the party's nominee for president during the 1981 presidential election. Yu finished second behind incumbent President Chun Doo-hwan, receiving 404 electoral votes (7.67%). Despite his loss, Yu's party managed to become the 2nd largest party in the National Assembly following the 1981 legislative election. Yu served as the main opposition party leader until the newly founded New Korean Democratic Party outperformed Yu's party in the 1985 legislative election, relegating the Democratic Korea Party to a minor party. The party was eventually dissolved following the 1988 legislative election, in which every single Democratic Korea Party candidate was defeated and the party only massed 0.2% of the total vote.

== Later life ==
Following the dissolvement of his party, Yu retired from politics. He went on to briefly serve as the Chairman of the Constitutional Council of the Republic of Korea from 2001 to 2003.

His wife preceded him in death in May 2006. This event had a profound impact on Yu, whose health worsened as a result. Yu died on 2 June 2006 at Seoul National University Hospital, aged 81, being survived by his two daughters and his son Yoo Il-ho (who would serve as Acting Prime Minister of South Korea in 2017). He was buried at park cemetery in Cheonan, South Korea.
