= Democratic Party (South Korea, 1963) =

1963–1965 political party in South Korea

- Founded: July 18, 1963
- Dissolved: May 3, 1965
- Preceded by: Democratic Party (South Korea, 1955)
- Merged into: People's Party (South Korea, 1965–67)
- Ideology: Liberalism; Conservatism; Liberal democracy Democratization; Nationalism
- Political position: Centrism to Far-right
- Colors: Black
- National Assembly: 15 / 175

Election symbol

Korean name
- Hangul: 민주당
- Hanja: 民主黨
- RR: Minjudang
- MR: Minjudang

The Democratic Party (Korean: 민주당) was founded in 1963.

== History ==
- The Democratic Party was re-established on 18 July 1963, led by figures such as Park Sun-cheon.
- It was officially registered on 17 August 1963.
- It secured 13 seats in the 1963 South Korean legislative election, becoming the second-largest opposition party.
- 10 June 1964, it absorbed the People Party (led by Kim Byeong-ro)
- 3 May 1965, it ceased to exist after merging with the Civil Rule Party, the largest opposition party in the National Assembly, to form the People's Party (1965).

== Leadership history ==
No.	Leader	Position	Term	Notes
1	Park Sun-cheon	President	18 July 1963 – 12 December 1964	
2	Park Sun-cheon	Representative Supreme Committee Member	12 December 1964 – 3 May 1965	Newly merged into the People's Party

== Major election results ==
=== National Assembly elections ===
Year	Election	Constituency		Proportional representation		Total	
Year	Election	Seats won	Vote share	Seats won	Vote share	Seats won	Vote share
1963	6th	9/131	6.87%	5/44	13.5%	14/175	8%

== Past national conventions ==
Democratic Party Founding Convention, 18 July 1963.

- Adoption of the party constitution and platform and policies
- Appointment of Park Sun-chun as party president
- Agreement not to field a candidate in the 5th South Korean Presidential Election to facilitate the unification of opposition forces against Park Chung-hee.
- Resolution urging the lifting of the Political Activities Purification Act.

Democratic Party, People's Party merger Convention, 12 December 1964.

- Resolution by the People's Party to merge
- Introduction of group leadership system
- Representative Park Sun-cheon was elected as President of the Democratic Party of Korea

Inaugural Convention of the People's Party on 3 May 1965.

The 30-member delegation with full authority to negotiate a merger between the Democratic Party and the Civil Rule Party unanimously resolved to merge the two parties and adopted a merger declaration; following the signing of this declaration by Civil Rule Party President Yun Po-sun and Democratic representative Park Sun-cheon, the two parties were merged to form a new party, the People's Party.
