= 1967 South Korean legislative election =

- 8 June 1967

All 175 seats in the National Assembly 88 seats needed for a majority
- Turnout: 76.12% (▲4.01pp)
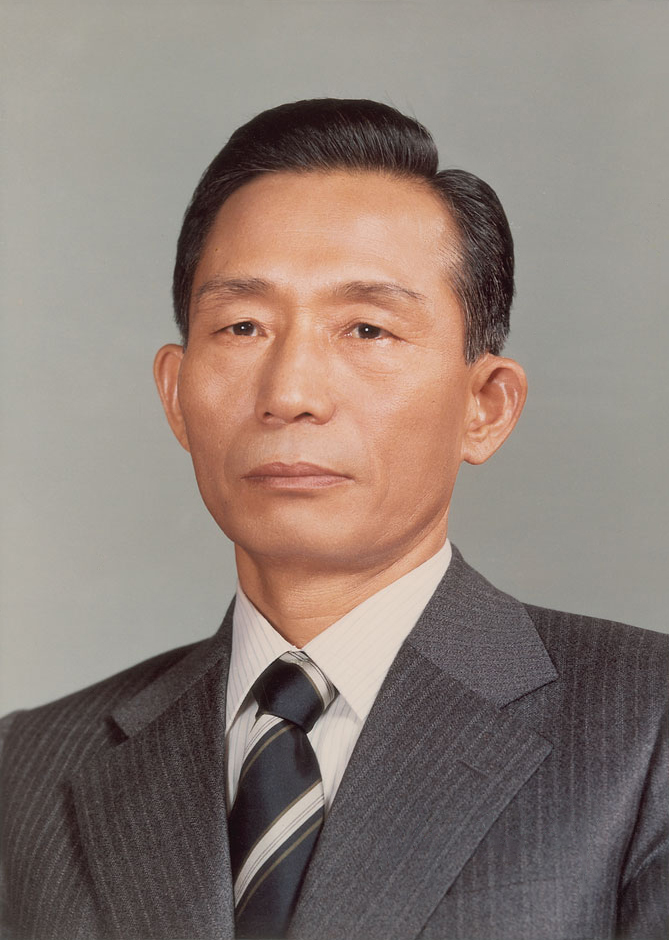

	Majority party	Minority party
Leader	Park Chung Hee	Yu Jin-oh
Party	Democratic Republican	New Democratic
Last election	110 seats	65 (Note: Civil Rule Party, Democratic Party, Liberal Democratic Party and People's Party)
Seats won	129	45
Seat change	▲19	▼20
Popular vote	5,494,922	3,554,224
Percentage	50.62%	32.74%
Swing	▲17.14pp	▼17.91
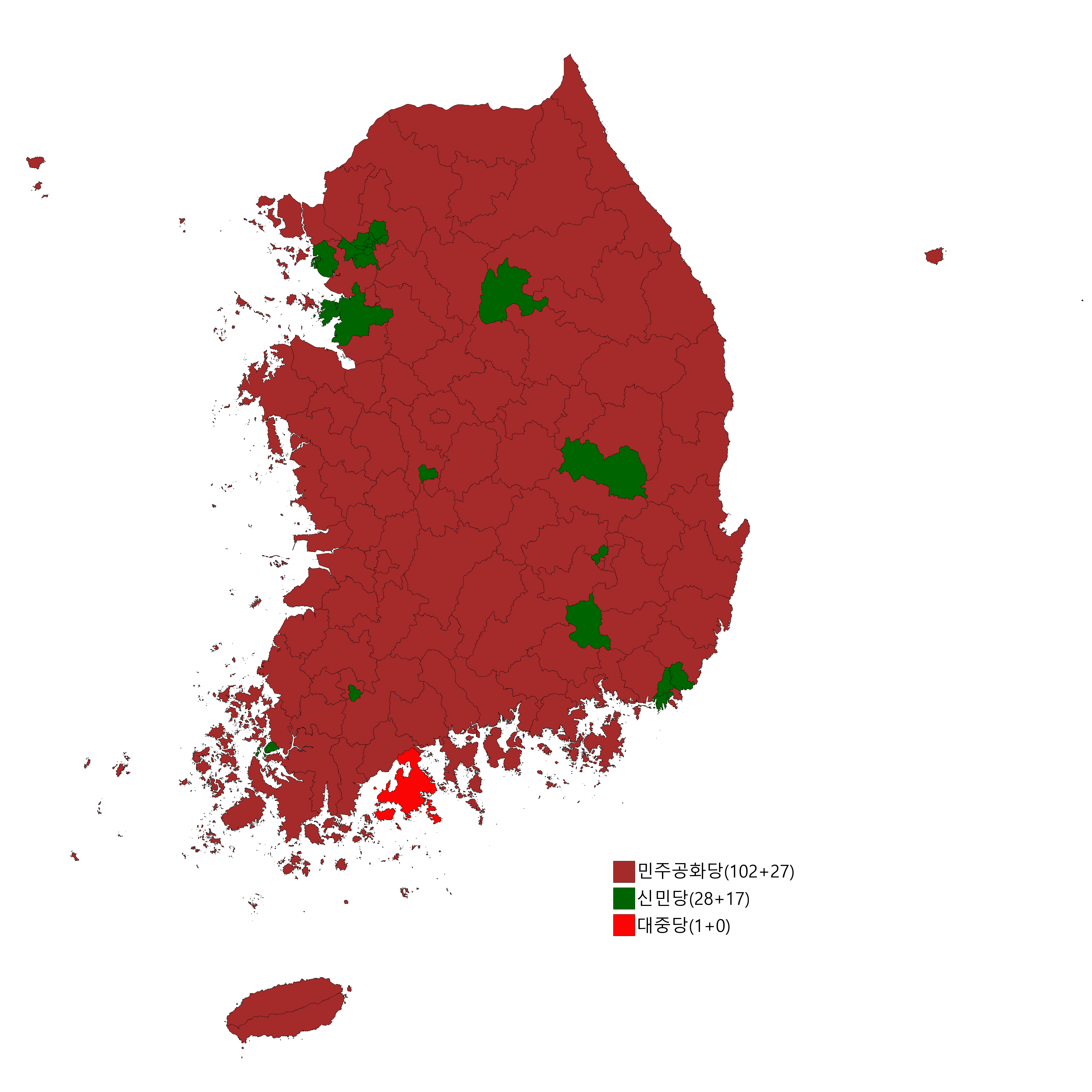
- Results by constituency
Speaker before election
Rhee Hyo-sang
Democratic Republican
Elected Speaker
Rhee Hyo-sang
Democratic Republican

Legislative elections were held in South Korea on 8 June 1967. The result was a victory for the Democratic Republican Party, which won 129 of the 175 seats in the National Assembly. Voter turnout was 76.1%.

== Electoral system ==
The unicameral National Assembly was elected by parallel voting, with 131 legislators elected in single-member constituencies and 44 allocated via a modified formula on the national level, excluding parties that did not win more than three seats or more than 5% of the valid vote. If the percentage of votes for the first-placed party was over 50%, the national seats would be allocated in proportion to vote share, with the first-placed party being limited to two-thirds of the available national seats (it would then be eliminated from further consideration for national seats).

When the number of votes of the top party was less than 50%, half of the seats in the national constituency were automatically allocated to the first-placed party (which was then eliminated from further consideration for national seats), and the process repeated for the remaining parties (meaning the second place party would now be considered the "top party" for purposes of the next allocation) until all remaining seats were allocated.

== Results ==
Graph of the party split among 175 seats.
Party	Votes	%	Seats			
Party	Votes	%	FPTP	PR	Total	+/–
Democratic Republican Party	5,494,922	50.62	102	27	129	+19
New Democratic Party	3,554,224	32.74	28	17	45	–20
Liberal Party	393,448	3.62	0	0	0	0
Democratic Party	323,203	2.98	0	0	0	New
Mass Party	249,561	2.30	1	0	1	New
Korea Independence Party	240,936	2.22	0	0	0	0
People's Party	180,324	1.66	0	0	0	–2
Justice Party	142,670	1.31	0	0	0	New
Democratic Socialist Party	104,975	0.97	0	0	0	New
Free People's Party	88,474	0.81	0	0	0	New
New Korea Party	83,271	0.77	0	0	0	New
Total	10,856,008	100.00	131	44	175	0
Valid votes	10,856,008	96.91				
Invalid/blank votes	346,309	3.09				
Total votes	11,202,317	100.00				
Registered voters/turnout	14,717,354	76.12				
Source: Nohlen et al.

=== Results by city/province ===
Region	Total seats	Seats won		
Region	Total seats	DRP	NDP	MP
Seoul	14	1	13	0
Busan	7	2	5	0
Gyeonggi	13	10	3	0
Gangwon	9	8	1	0
North Chungcheong	8	8	0	0
South Chungcheong	13	12	1	0
North Jeolla	11	11	0	0
South Jeolla	19	16	2	1
North Gyeongsang	20	18	2	0
South Gyeongsang	15	14	1	0
Jeju	2	2	0	0
Constituency total	131	102	28	1
PR list	44	27	17	0
Total	175	129	45	1
