= List of members of the National Assembly (South Korea), 1954–1958 =

The members of the 3rd National Assembly of South Korea were elected on 20 May 1954. The assembly sat from 31 May 1954 until 30 May 1958.

== Members ==
Province/City	Constituency	Member	Party	
Province/City	Constituency	Member	At election	At term's end
Seoul	Jung A	Yun Chi-young	KNP	KNP
Seoul	Jung B	Jeong Il-hyeong	Independent	Democratic
Seoul	Jongno A	Yun Po-sun	DNP	Democratic
Seoul	Jongno B	Kim Du-han	Independent	WFP
Seoul	Dongdaemun	Min Gwan-sik	Independent	Independent
Seoul	Seongbuk	Kim Il	Liberal	Independent
Seoul	Seongdong A	Im Heung-sun	Independent	Liberal
Seoul	Seongdong B	Kim Jae-hwang	Independent	Liberal
Seoul	Seodaemun A	Kim Do-yeon	DNP	Democratic
Seoul	Seodaemun B	Lee Ki-poong	Liberal	Liberal
Seoul	Mapo A	Kim Sang-don	DNP	Democratic
Seoul	Mapo B	Ham Du-yeong	Liberal	Liberal
Seoul	Yongsan A	Nam Song-hak	Liberal	Liberal
Seoul	Yongsan B	Hwang Seong-su	Liberal	Liberal
Seoul	Yeongdeungpo A	Yun Jae-uk	Independent	Liberal
Seoul	Yeongdeungpo B	Lee In	KNP	Independent
Gyeonggi Province	Incheon A	Kim Jae-gon	Independent	Democratic
Gyeonggi Province	Incheon B	Kwak Sang-hun	Independent	Democratic
Gyeonggi Province	Incheon C	Pyo Yang-mun	Liberal	Liberal
Gyeonggi Province	Suwon	Jeong Jon-su	Liberal	Liberal
Gyeonggi Province	Goyang	Han Dong-seok (Note: Han Dong-seok died on 3 August 1956.)	Liberal	Democratic
Gyeonggi Province	Goyang	Lee Seong-ju (Note: Lee Seong-ju was by-elected on 5 November 1956, to succeed Han Dong-seok.)	Liberal	Liberal
Gyeonggi Province	Gwangju	Sin Ik-hui (Note: Sin Ik-hui died on 5 May 1956.)	DNP	Democratic
Gyeonggi Province	Gwangju	Sin Ha-gyun (Note: Sin Ha-gyun was by-elected on 23 August 1956, to succeed Sin Ik-hui.)	Democratic	Democratic
Gyeonggi Province	Yangju A	Kim Jong-gyu	Liberal	Liberal
Gyeonggi Province	Yangju B	Kang Seung-gu	Independent	Democratic
Gyeonggi Province	Pocheon	Yun Seong-sun	Liberal	Liberal
Gyeonggi Province	Gapyeong	Oh Hyeong-geun	Liberal	Independent
Gyeonggi Province	Yangpyeong	Cheon Se-gi	Independent	Democratic
Gyeonggi Province	Yeoju	Kim Ui-jun	Independent	Liberal
Gyeonggi Province	Icheon	Kim Byeong-cheol	Liberal	Liberal
Gyeonggi Province	Yongin	Sin Ui-sik	Liberal	Liberal
Gyeonggi Province	Anseong	Oh Jae-yeong	Independent	Independent
Gyeonggi Province	Pyeongtaek	Hwang Gyeong-su	Liberal	Independent
Gyeonggi Province	Hwaseong A	Son Do-sim	Liberal	Liberal
Gyeonggi Province	Hwaseong B	Choi Byeong-guk	Liberal	Liberal
Gyeonggi Province	Siheung	Lee Yeong-seop	Liberal	Independent
Gyeonggi Province	Bucheon	Jang Gyeong-geun	Liberal	Liberal
Gyeonggi Province	Gimpo	Jeong Jun	Independent	Independent
Gyeonggi Province	Ganghwa	Yun Il-sang	Liberal	Liberal
Gyeonggi Province	Paju	Jeong-Dae-cheon	Liberal	Liberal
Gangwon Province	Chuncheon	Hong Chang-seop	Liberal	Liberal
Gangwon Province	Chunseong	Lim U-yeong	NA	Liberal
Gangwon Province	Hongcheon	Lee Jae-hak	Liberal	Liberal
Gangwon Province	Hoengseong	Jang Seok-yun	Independent	Liberal
Gangwon Province	Wonju	Ham Jae-hun	Liberal	Liberal
Gangwon Province	Yeongwol	Jeong Gyu-sang	Liberal	Liberal
Gangwon Province	Pyeongchang	Lee Hyeong-jin	Liberal	Liberal
Gangwon Province	Jeongseon	Jeon Sang-yo	Independent	Liberal
Gangwon Province	Gangneung A	Choi Yong-geun	Liberal	Liberal
Gangwon Province	Gangneung B	Park Yong-ik	Independent	Liberal
Gangwon Province	Samcheok	Kim Jin-man	Liberal	Liberal
Gangwon Province	Uljin	Jeon Man-jung	Liberal	Liberal
North Chungcheong Province	Cheongju	Park Gi-un	CAMA	Independent
North Chungcheong Province	Cheongwon A	Sin Jeong-ho	Independent	Democratic
North Chungcheong Province	Cheongwon B	Kwak Ui-yeong	Liberal	Liberal
North Chungcheong Province	Boeun	Kim Seon-u	Liberal	Liberal
North Chungcheong Province	Okcheon	Sin Gak-hyu	DNP	Democratic
North Chungcheong Province	Yeongdong	Choi Sun-ju (Note: Choi Sun-ju died on 11 June 1956.)	Liberal	Liberal
North Chungcheong Province	Yeongdong	Son Jun-hyeon (Note: Son Jun-hyeon was by-elected on 1 October 1956, to succeed Choi Sun-ju.)	Liberal	Liberal
North Chungcheong Province	Jincheon	Lee Chung-hwan	Liberal	Democratic
North Chungcheong Province	Gwisan	An Dong-jun	Liberal	Liberal
North Chungcheong Province	Eumseong	Lee Hak-rim	Liberal	Liberal
North Chungcheong Province	Chungju	Kim Gi-cheol	Liberal	Democratic
North Chungcheong Province	Jecheon	Lee Tae-yong	Liberal	Democratic
North Chungcheong Province	Danyang	Jang-yeong-geun	Independent	Independent
South Chungcheong Province	Daejeon	Jeong Sang-ryeol	Liberal	Liberal
South Chungcheong Province	Daedeok	Song U-beom	Liberal	Liberal
South Chungcheong Province	Yeongi	Yu Ji-won	Liberal	Liberal
South Chungcheong Province	Gongju A	Yeom U-yang	Liberal	Liberal
South Chungcheong Province	Gongju B	Kim Dal-su	Liberal	Liberal
South Chungcheong Province	Nonsan A	Sin Tae-gwon	Liberal	Liberal
South Chungcheong Province	Nonsan B	Yuk Wan-guk	Independent	Democratic
South Chungcheong Province	Buyeo A	Lee Seok-gi	Independent	Democratic
South Chungcheong Province	Buyeo B	Jo Nam-su	Liberal	Liberal
South Chungcheong Province	Seocheon	Ra Hui-jip	Liberal	Liberal
South Chungcheong Province	Boryeong	Kim Yeong-seon	Liberal	Democratic
South Chungcheong Province	Cheongyang	Jeong Myeong-seon	Liberal	Liberal
South Chungcheong Province	Hongseong	Kim Ji-jun	Liberal	Liberal
South Chungcheong Province	Yesan	Seong Won-gyeong	Liberal	Democratic
South Chungcheong Province	Seosan A	Ra Chang-heon	Liberal	Independent
South Chungcheong Province	Seosan B	Ryu Sun-sik	Liberal	Liberal
South Chungcheong Province	Dangjin	In Tae-sik	Liberal	Liberal
South Chungcheong Province	Asan	Hong Sun-cheol	Liberal	Liberal
South Chungcheong Province	Cheonan	Han Hui-seok	Liberal	Liberal
North Jeolla Province	Jeonju	Yi Cheol-seung	Independent	Democratic
North Jeolla Province	Gunsan	Kim Pan-sul	DNP	Democratic
North Jeolla Province	Iri	Kim Chun-ho	Liberal	Independent
North Jeolla Province	Wanju A	Lee Jon-hwa	Liberal	Liberal
North Jeolla Province	Wanju B	Son Gwon-bae	Liberal	Liberal
North Jeolla Province	Jinan	Lee Bok-seong (Note: Lee Bok-seong died on 18 July 1954.)	Liberal	Liberal
North Jeolla Province	Jinan	Park Jeong-geun (Note: Park Jeong-geun was by-elected on 25 October 1954, to succeed Lee Bok-seong.)	Liberal	Liberal
North Jeolla Province	Geumsan	Yu Chin-san	Independent	Democratic
North Jeolla Province	Muju	Kim Sang-hyeon	Liberal	Democratic
North Jeolla Province	Jangsu	Jeong Jun-mo	Independent	Liberal
North Jeolla Province	Imsil	Park Se-gyeong	Liberal	Liberal
North Jeolla Province	Namwon	Yang Yeong-ju	Liberal	Liberal
North Jeolla Province	Sunchang	Lim Cha-ju	Liberal	Liberal
North Jeolla Province	Jeongeup A	Kim Chang-su	Liberal	Liberal
North Jeolla Province	Jeongeup B	Kim Taek-sul	Independent	Independent
North Jeolla Province	Gochang A	Jeong Se-hwan	Independent	Liberal
North Jeolla Province	Gochang B	Sin Yong-uk	Liberal	Liberal
North Jeolla Province	Buan	Sin Gyu-sik	Independent	Liberal
North Jeolla Province	Gimje A	Song Bang-yong	Independent	Independent
North Jeolla Province	Gimje B	Yun Je-sul	Independent	Democratic
North Jeolla Province	Okgu	Yang Il-dong	Independent	Independent
North Jeolla Province	Iksan A	So Seon-gyu	DNP	Democratic
North Jeolla Province	Iksan B	Kang Se-hyeong	Independent	Liberal
South Jeolla Province	Gwangju	Jeong Seong-tae	Independent	Democratic
South Jeolla Province	Mokpo	Jeong Jung-seop	DNP	Democratic
South Jeolla Province	Yeosu	Jeong Jae-wan	Independent	Democratic
South Jeolla Province	Suncheon	Yun Hyeong-nam	Independent	Democratic
South Jeolla Province	Gwangsan A	Lee Jeong-hyu	Liberal	Liberal
South Jeolla Province	Gwangsan B	Park Heung-gyu	Liberal	Liberal
South Jeolla Province	Damyang	Park Yeong-jong	Liberal	Unification
South Jeolla Province	Gokseong	Jo Sun	Liberal	Liberal
South Jeolla Province	Gurye	Lee Gap-sik	Independent	Liberal
South Jeolla Province	Gwangyang	Kim Jeong-ho	Liberal	Liberal
South Jeolla Province	Yeocheon	Kim Cheol-ju	Independent	Liberal
South Jeolla Province	Seungju	Lee Hyeong-mo	Liberal	Liberal
South Jeolla Province	Goheung A	Son Mun-gyeong	Liberal	Liberal
South Jeolla Province	Goheung B	Song Gyeong-seop	Liberal	Liberal
South Jeolla Province	Boseong	Kim Seong-bok	Independent	Liberal
South Jeolla Province	Hwasun	Ku Heung-nam	Liberal	Liberal
South Jeolla Province	Jangheung	Son Seok-du	Liberal	Liberal
South Jeolla Province	Gangjin	Kim Seong-ho	Liberal	Liberal
South Jeolla Province	Haenam A	Kim Byeong-sun	Liberal	Liberal
South Jeolla Province	Haenam B	Min Yeong-nam	Independent	Democratic
South Jeolla Province	Yeongam	Kim Chun-yon	DNP	Unification
South Jeolla Province	Muan A	Sin Haeng-yong	Independent	Liberal
South Jeolla Province	Muan B	Yu Ok-u	Liberal	Democratic
South Jeolla Province	Naju A	Choi Yeong-cheol	Independent	Liberal
South Jeolla Province	Naju B	Jeong Myeong-seop	Liberal	Liberal
South Jeolla Province	Hampyeong	Kim Ui-taek	Independent	Democratic
South Jeolla Province	Yeonggwang	Jo Yeong-gyu	DNP	Democratic
South Jeolla Province	Jangseong	Byeon Jin-gap	Independent	Liberal
South Jeolla Province	Wando	Kim Seon-tae	Independent	Democratic
South Jeolla Province	Jindo	Jo Byeong-mun	Liberal	Liberal
North Gyeongsang Province	Daegu A	Seo Dong-jin	DNP	Democratic
North Gyeongsang Province	Daegu B	Chough Pyung-ok	DNP	Democratic
North Gyeongsang Province	Daegu C	Lee U-chul	Independent	Liberal
North Gyeongsang Province	Pohang	Ha Tae-hwan	Independent	Liberal
North Gyeongsang Province	Gimcheon	Mun Jong-du	Independent	Independent
North Gyeongsang Province	Dalseong	Jo Jae-cheon	DNP	Democratic
North Gyeongsang Province	Gunwi	Park Man-won	Liberal	Liberal
North Gyeongsang Province	Uiseong A	Park Yeong-chul (Note: Park Yeong-chul was removed on 7 February 1958.)	Independent	Liberal
North Gyeongsang Province	Uiseong B	Park Yeong-gyo	Independent	Liberal
North Gyeongsang Province	Andong A	Kwon O-jong	NA	Democratic
North Gyeongsang Province	Andong B	Kim Ik-gi	Independent	Liberal
North Gyeongsang Province	Cheongsong	Yun Yong-gu	Liberal	Liberal
North Gyeongsang Province	Yeongyang	Park Jong-gil	Independent	Liberal
North Gyeongsang Province	Yeongdeok	Kim Won-gyu	Liberal	Liberal
North Gyeongsang Province	Yeongil A	Park Sun-seok	Liberal	Liberal
North Gyeongsang Province	Yeongil B	Kim Ik-no	Liberal	Liberal
North Gyeongsang Province	Gyeongju A	Kim Cheol	Independent	Liberal
North Gyeongsang Province	Gyeongju B	Lee Hyeop-u	Independent	Liberal
North Gyeongsang Province	Yeongcheon A	Kim Sang-don	Liberal	Liberal
North Gyeongsang Province	Yeongcheon B	Kwon Jung-don	Independent	Democratic
North Gyeongsang Province	Gyeongsan	Park Hae-jeong	Independent	Democratic
North Gyeongsang Province	Cheongdo	Kim Bo-yeong	Liberal	Liberal
North Gyeongsang Province	Goryeong	Kim Hong-sik	Liberal	Liberal
North Gyeongsang Province	Seongju	Do Jin-hui (Note: Do Jin-hui was removed on 7 September 1957.)	Liberal	Liberal
North Gyeongsang Province	Chilgok	Chang Taek-sang	Independent	Independent
North Gyeongsang Province	Geumneung	Kim Cheol-an	Liberal	Liberal
North Gyeongsang Province	Seonsan	Kim U-dong	Independent	Liberal
North Gyeongsang Province	Sangju A	Kim Dal-ho (Note: Kim Dal-ho was removed in 1958.)	Independent	Progressive
North Gyeongsang Province	Sangju B	Baek Nam-sik	Independent	Liberal
North Gyeongsang Province	Mungyeong	Yun Man-seok	Liberal	Liberal
North Gyeongsang Province	Yecheon	Hyeon Seok-ho	Liberal	Democratic
North Gyeongsang Province	Yeongju	Lee Jeong-hui	Liberal	Liberal
North Gyeongsang Province	Bonghwa	Jeong Mun-heum	Liberal	Liberal
North Gyeongsang Province	Ulleung	Choi Byeong-gwon	Liberal	Liberal
South Gyeongsang Province	Busan A	Kim Ji-tae	Liberal	Independent
South Gyeongsang Province	Busan B	Jeon Jin-han	Independent	WFP
South Gyeongsang Province	Busan C	Jeong Gi-won	Liberal	Liberal
South Gyeongsang Province	Busan D	Kim Dong-uk	Independent	Democratic
South Gyeongsang Province	Busan E	Lee Yeong-eon	Liberal	Liberal
South Gyeongsang Province	Masan	Kim Jong-sin	Liberal	Liberal
South Gyeongsang Province	Jinju	Seo In-hong	Independent	Liberal
South Gyeongsang Province	Jinyang	Hwang Nam-pal	Liberal	Independent
South Gyeongsang Province	Uiryeong	Lee Yeong-hui	Liberal	Liberal
South Gyeongsang Province	Haman	Jo Gyeong-gyu	Liberal	Liberal
South Gyeongsang Province	Changnyeong	Ha Eul-chun	Independent	Liberal
South Gyeongsang Province	Milyang A	Kim Hyeong-deok	Liberal	Liberal
South Gyeongsang Province	Milyang B	Jo Man-jong	Liberal	Liberal
South Gyeongsang Province	Yangsan	Ji Yeong-jin	Independent	Liberal
South Gyeongsang Province	Ulsan A	Kim Su-seon	Independent	Independent
South Gyeongsang Province	Ulsan B	Jeong Hae-yeong	Liberal	Independent
South Gyeongsang Province	Dongnae	Kim Beop-rin	Liberal	Liberal
South Gyeongsang Province	Gimhae A	Park Jae-hong	DNP	Independent
South Gyeongsang Province	Gimhae B	Lee Jong-su	Independent	Liberal
South Gyeongsang Province	Changwon A	Kim Seong-sam	Liberal	Liberal
South Gyeongsang Province	Changwon B	Lee Yong-beom	Liberal	Liberal
South Gyeongsang Province	Tongyeong A	Choi Cheon	DNP	Democratic
South Gyeongsang Province	Tongyeong B	Kim Young-sam	Liberal	Democratic
South Gyeongsang Province	Goseong	Choi Gap-hwan	Independent	Liberal
South Gyeongsang Province	Sacheon	Jeong Gap-ju	Liberal	Liberal
South Gyeongsang Province	Namhae	Yun Byeong-ho	Independent	Democratic
South Gyeongsang Province	Hadong	Kang Bong-ok	Liberal	Liberal
South Gyeongsang Province	Sancheong	Lee Byeong-hong (Note: Lee Byeong-hong died on 17 October 1955.)	Independent	Independent
South Gyeongsang Province	Sancheong	An Jun-gi (Note: An Jun-gi was by-elected on 27 December 1955, to succeed Lee Byeong-hong.)	Liberal	Liberal
South Gyeongsang Province	Hamyang	Kim Yeong-sang	NA	Liberal
South Gyeongsang Province	Geochang	Sin Do-seong	DNP	Independent
South Gyeongsang Province	Hapcheon A	Yu Bong-sun	Independent	Liberal
South Gyeongsang Province	Hapcheon B	Choi Chang-seop	Liberal	Liberal
Jeju Province	Bukjeju A	Kim Seok-ho	Independent	Liberal
Jeju Province	Bukjeju B	Kim Du-jin	Independent	Liberal
Jeju Province	Namjeju	Kang Gyeong-ok	Liberal	Liberal
