= Greater Tzaneen Local Municipality elections =

The Greater Tzaneen Local Municipality is a Local Municipality in Limpopo, South Africa. The council consists of sixty-nine members elected by mixed-member proportional representation. Thirty-five councillors are elected by first-past-the-post voting in thirty-five wards, while the remaining thirty-four are chosen from party lists so that the total number of party representatives is proportional to the number of votes received. In the election of 1 November 2021 the African National Congress (ANC) won a majority of 51 seats.

== Results ==
The following table shows the composition of the council after past elections.

Event	ACDP	ANC	APC	COPE	DA	EFF	XP	Other	Total
2000 election	1	53	—	—	6	—	1	5	66
2006 election	2	55	—	—	4	—	1	5	67
2011 election	1	59	1	2	5	—	0	0	68
2016 election	0	52	1	1	7	8	—	0	69
2021 election	0	51	1	0	5	9	0	3	69

== December 2000 election ==
The following table shows the results of the 2000 election.

Party	Ward			List			Total seats
Party	Votes	%	Seats	Votes	%	Seats	Total seats
African National Congress	43,101	75.64	32	43,722	77.82	21	53
Democratic Alliance	4,932	8.66	1	5,074	9.03	5	6
United Democratic Movement	2,438	4.28	0	3,333	5.93	3	3
Independent candidates	4,510	7.92	0				0
African Christian Democratic Party	733	1.29	0	1,345	2.39	1	1
Azanian People's Organisation	442	0.78	0	1,292	2.30	1	1
Ximoko Party	324	0.57	0	921	1.64	1	1
Inkatha Freedom Party	499	0.88	0	495	0.88	1	1
Total	56,979	100.00	33	56,182	100.00	33	66
Valid votes	56,979	97.88		56,182	96.58		
Invalid/blank votes	1,233	2.12		1,989	3.42		
Total votes	58,212	100.00		58,171	100.00		
Registered voters/turnout	143,877	40.46		143,877	40.43		

== March 2006 election ==
The following table shows the results of the 2006 election.

Party	Ward			List			Total seats
Party	Votes	%	Seats	Votes	%	Seats	Total seats
African National Congress	58,239	80.89	32	59,199	82.66	23	55
Democratic Alliance	3,790	5.26	1	3,624	5.06	3	4
Alliance for Democracy and Prosperity	2,425	3.37	0	3,300	4.61	3	3
African Christian Democratic Party	1,327	1.84	0	1,882	2.63	2	2
Independent candidates	2,962	4.11	1				1
Ximoko Party	1,305	1.81	0	1,432	2.00	1	1
Pan Africanist Congress of Azania	1,433	1.99	0	1,265	1.77	1	1
United Democratic Movement	164	0.23	0	561	0.78	0	0
Inkatha Freedom Party	355	0.49	0	357	0.50	0	0
Total	72,000	100.00	34	71,620	100.00	33	67
Valid votes	72,000	98.46		71,620	97.94		
Invalid/blank votes	1,124	1.54		1,509	2.06		
Total votes	73,124	100.00		73,129	100.00		
Registered voters/turnout	165,259	44.25		165,259	44.25		

== May 2011 election ==
The following table shows the results of the 2011 election.

Party	Ward			List			Total seats
Party	Votes	%	Seats	Votes	%	Seats	Total seats
African National Congress	69,809	81.48	32	73,699	85.82	27	59
Democratic Alliance	6,036	7.05	2	6,382	7.43	3	5
Independent candidates	5,415	6.32	0				0
Congress of the People	1,660	1.94	0	2,140	2.49	2	2
African People's Convention	726	0.85	0	1,106	1.29	1	1
African Christian Democratic Party	414	0.48	0	733	0.85	1	1
Future Democratic Party	439	0.51	0	447	0.52	0	0
Azanian People's Organisation	251	0.29	0	331	0.39	0	0
Pan Africanist Congress of Azania	189	0.22	0	339	0.39	0	0
Freedom Front Plus	297	0.35	0	189	0.22	0	0
United Democratic Movement	241	0.28	0	189	0.22	0	0
United Christian Democratic Party	184	0.21	0	135	0.16	0	0
Ximoko Party	14	0.02	0	188	0.22	0	0
Total	85,675	100.00	34	85,878	100.00	34	68
Valid votes	85,675	98.81		85,878	98.55		
Invalid/blank votes	1,029	1.19		1,266	1.45		
Total votes	86,704	100.00		87,144	100.00		
Registered voters/turnout	174,746	49.62		174,746	49.87		

== August 2016 election ==
The following table shows the results of the 2016 election.

Party	Ward			List			Total seats
Party	Votes	%	Seats	Votes	%	Seats	Total seats
African National Congress	70,135	74.88	33	71,135	75.53	19	52
Economic Freedom Fighters	10,717	11.44	0	11,222	11.91	8	8
Democratic Alliance	8,520	9.10	2	8,672	9.21	5	7
African People's Convention	1,017	1.09	0	1,078	1.14	1	1
Independent candidates	1,616	1.73	0				0
Congress of the People	731	0.78	0	707	0.75	1	1
Freedom Front Plus	443	0.47	0	403	0.43	0	0
African Christian Democratic Party	165	0.18	0	418	0.44	0	0
Tzaneen Freedom Party	147	0.16	0	206	0.22	0	0
Pan Africanist Congress of Azania	105	0.11	0	192	0.20	0	0
United Democratic Movement	48	0.05	0	88	0.09	0	0
Inkatha Freedom Party	18	0.02	0	66	0.07	0	0
Total	93,662	100.00	35	94,187	100.00	34	69
Valid votes	93,662	98.77		94,187	98.65		
Invalid/blank votes	1,162	1.23		1,288	1.35		
Total votes	94,824	100.00		95,475	100.00		
Registered voters/turnout	184,324	51.44		184,324	51.80		

== November 2021 election ==
The following table shows the results of the 2021 election.

Party	Ward			List			Total seats
Party	Votes	%	Seats	Votes	%	Seats	Total seats
African National Congress	55,146	70.16	32	57,347	74.03	19	51
Economic Freedom Fighters	9,303	11.84	0	10,435	13.47	9	9
Democratic Alliance	4,918	6.26	2	4,923	6.36	3	5
Independent candidates	4,763	6.06	1				1
Freedom Front Plus	1,214	1.54	0	1,177	1.52	1	1
African People's Convention	822	1.05	0	578	0.75	1	1
African Freedom Party	490	0.62	0	349	0.45	1	1
Congress of the People	420	0.53	0	404	0.52	0	0
African Christian Democratic Party	394	0.50	0	417	0.54	0	0
Able Leadership	414	0.53	0	385	0.50	0	0
Patriotic Alliance	325	0.41	0	302	0.39	0	0
Kingdom Covenant Democratic Party	103	0.13	0	276	0.36	0	0
Pan Africanist Congress of Azania	21	0.03	0	199	0.26	0	0
Forum for Service Delivery	62	0.08	0	128	0.17	0	0
Azanian People's Organisation	20	0.03	0	146	0.19	0	0
Africa Restoration Alliance	75	0.10	0	69	0.09	0	0
Civic Warriors	48	0.06	0	74	0.10	0	0
United Democratic Movement	41	0.05	0	75	0.10	0	0
Ximoko Party	10	0.01	0	90	0.12	0	0
Abantu Batho Congress	9	0.01	0	86	0.11	0	0
Total	78,598	100.00	35	77,460	100.00	34	69
Valid votes	78,598	98.58		77,460	97.35		
Invalid/blank votes	1,135	1.42		2,109	2.65		
Total votes	79,733	100.00		79,569	100.00		
Registered voters/turnout	182,387	43.72		182,387	43.63		
