= Civil Rule Party =

1963–1965 political party in South Korea

Civil Rule Party 민정당
- Abbreviation: CRP
- Founded: 28 June 1963; 63 years ago
- Dissolved: 8 May 1965; 61 years ago
- Preceded by: Democratic Party
- Succeeded by: People's Party
- Ideology: Liberalism (South Korean); Conservatism; Liberal democracy Humanism

The Civil Rule Party (CRP; Korean: 민정당; Hanja: 民政黨), sometimes referred to as the Civil Rights Party, was a political party that existed in South Korea during the Third Republic. The party was the successor to the Democratic Party, supported by former President Yun Po-sun, along with future Presidents Kim Dae-jung and Kim Young-sam. It was composed primarily of affiliates of the New Democratic Party, which had been formed after the old-school supporters of Yun Po-sun broke from the ruling Democratic Party during the Second Republic. On May 11, 1965, it merged with the Democratic Party to become the People's Party.

== History ==
In the aftermath of April Revolution of 1960 and the May 16 coup of 1961, figures from the de facto defunct Liberal Party were divided into factions such as Bae Jong-duk, future members of the Civil Rule Party such as Kim Beop-lin, members of the Democratic Republican Party such as Lee Hwal, and figures who strived to found a new independent party such as Lee Beom-seok. The founding meeting of the Civil Rule Party was held on 27 January 1963, after the restrictions on political activity following the May 16 coup were lifted, and on 14 May that year, the party was officially established.

Initially, the Civil Rule Party was going to participate in the formation of the People's Party of 1963, a unified opposition party established through the alliance of other conservative opposition parties, including the Democratic Party and the New Politics Party. However, because a compromise could not be reached regarding the presidential nomination, it split from the People’s Party, and on 12 September, held its own party convention. Based on the guiding principles of liberal democracy and a peaceful transition of power, the party chose Kim Byung-ro as the representative member of its Supreme Council, while Yun Po-sun was selected as its candidate for the 1963 South Korean presidential election. In the election, Yun Po-sun competed against Park Chung-hee, the candidate endorsed by the Democratic Republican Party, losing by a narrow margin of just over 150,000 votes, or 1.5%.

However, in the November legislative elections held shortly after, the Civil Rule Party received 20.1% of the vote and won 41 seats in the National Assembly. It therefore became country’s leading opposition party, and subsequently organized the “Committee of the People’s Struggle Against the Disgraceful Diplomacy with Japan” in collaboration with other opposition parties, to oppose the Japan-Korea talks being held to normalize diplomatic relations with Japan. As a result, following the absorption and integration of the Liberal Democratic Party of 1963 on 26 December 1964, the Civil Rule Party unified with the Democratic Party, the second largest opposition party, to form the People’s Party of 1965, the first unified opposition party of the Third Republic.

== Electoral results ==
=== President ===
Election	Candidate	Votes	%	Result
1963	Yun Posun	4,546,614	45.10	Not elected

=== Legislature ===
Election	Leader	Votes	%	Seats			Position	Status
Election	Leader	Votes	%	Constituency	Party list	Total	Position	Status
1963	Yun Posun	1,870,976	20.12	24 / 131	14 / 44	41 / 175	2nd	Opposition
