= Reconstruction Party (South Korea) =

1963 political party in South Korea

Reconstruction Party 재건당 再建黨
- Leader: Kim Jong-pil
- Founded: 10 January 1963
- Dissolved: 26 February 1963
- Succeeded by: Democratic Republican Party
- Ideology: Conservatism (South Korean); Pro–Park Chung Hee
- Political position: Far-right
- Colors: Brown

The Reconstruction Party (Korean: 재건당; Hanja: 再建黨) was a political party founded on 10 January 1963, by figures including Kim Jong-pil, and it served as the precursor to the Democratic Republican Party. The forces behind the military coup began preparations for a political party around December 1962; on 5 January 1963, Kim Jong-pil, then Director of the Korean Central Intelligence Agency, and others retired from active duty as Army brigadier generals, and on 10 January, they organised a party named Reconstruction Party.

Immediately after Kim Jong-pil and his associates announced the formation of the Reconstruction Party, opposition politicians, who were barred from political activity under existing laws, objected arguing that this amounted to the premature organisation of a political party. The forces behind the military coup subsequently recruited figures from the former Liberal Party and engaged in negotiations with pro-Syngman figures such as Yun Chi-young and Im Young-shin (who had previously organised the Great Korean Nationalist Party), as well as academics like Jeong Gu-young; this culminated in the founding of the Democratic Republican Party on 26 February 1963. Upon the establishment of the Democratic Republican Party, the Reconstruction Party announced its dissolution, ceasing to exist just one month after its inception. Some have criticised this move as merely a rebranding exercise designed to facilitate the military coup leaders' transition to civilian rule.
