= Future Democratic Party =

2020 political party in South Korea

Future Democratic Party 미래민주당
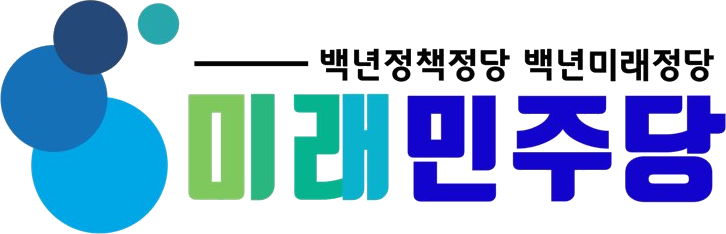
- Leader: Chun Se-kyung
- Founded: 11 March 2020 (officially registered on 16 March 2020)
- Dissolved: 28 July 2020
- Ideology: Social liberalism Populism
- Political position: Centre-left
- Colors: Sky blue
- Seats in the National Assembly: 0 / 300
- Metropolitan mayor and Gubernatorial: 0 / 17
- Municipal Mayors: 0 / 226
- Seats within local government: 0 / 2,926

Website
- miraeminjoo.co.kr

- Future Democratic Party
- Hangul: 미래민주당
- Hanja: 未來民主黨
- RR: Mirae minjudang
- MR: Mirae minjudang

The Future Democratic Party (Korean: 미래민주당) was a pro-Lee Jae-myung political party in South Korea.

== History ==
On January 23, 2020, former Democratic Party of Korea member; Chun Se-kyung left the Democratic Party of Korea and announced his will to create a new party. The party was officially founded on March 11, 2020 and officially registered with the National Election Commission on March 16, 2020. The party is made of mostly pro-Lee Jae-myung politicians; however, Lee Jae-myung himself has nothing to do with the party nor explicitly stated his support for the party. The party ran two candidates for proportional representation in the 2020 South Korean legislative election.

After the 2020 legislative elections, the Party dissolved itself.

== See also ==
- Politics of South Korea
- New Deal liberalism
