= National Assembly (South Korea) =

Unicameral legislature of South Korea

National Assembly of the Republic of Korea 대한민국 국회 大韓民國國會 Daehanminguk Gukhoe
- 22nd National Assembly
- Emblem

- Logo

Type
- Type: Unicameral

Leadership
- Speaker: Cho Jeong-sik, Independent since 5 June 2026
- Deputy Speaker: Nam In-soon, Democratic since 5 June 2026
- Park Duk-hyum, People Power since 5 June 2026
- Secretary General: Koh Yong-jin, Independent

Structure
- Seats: 300
- Political groups: Government (161); Democratic (161); Opposition (130); People Power (109); Rebuilding Korea (12); Progressive (4); Reform (3); Basic Income (1); Social Democratic (1); Unclassified (9); Independent (8) (Note: National Assembly Speaker Cho Jeong-sik and independent Kim Jong-min, Choi Hyuk-jin, Lee Chun-seok, Kang Sun-woo, Kim Byung-kee, Jang Kyung-tae, Han Dong-hoon); Vacant (1)
- Length of term: 4 years
- Salary: US$128,610

Elections
- Voting system: Mixed-member majoritarian representation (de jure MMP/AMS system, de facto parallel voting): 254 seats by FPTP; 46 seats by party-list PR using largest remainder method
- First election: 10 May 1948
- Last election: 10 April 2024
- Next election: By 12 April 2028

Meeting place
- Main Conference Room; National Assembly Building, Seoul; 37°31′55.21″N 126°54′50.66″E

Website
- assembly.go.kr

The National Assembly of the Republic of Korea (Korean: 대한민국 국회) is the unicameral national legislature of South Korea. (Note: Article 21, Clause 1 of the Election Law) Elections to the National Assembly are held every four years. The latest legislative elections were held on 10 April 2024. The current National Assembly held its first meeting, and also began its current four year term, on 30 May 2024. The current Speaker was elected 5 June 2026. Unlike many parliamentary systems, the Assembly may not be dissolved at an earlier date. The National Assembly has 300 seats, with 254 constituency seats and 46 proportional representation seats; PR seats are assigned an additional member system de jure but parallel voting de facto because the usage of decoy lists by the Democratic and People Power Parties is prevalent.

The unicameral assembly consists of at least 200 members according to the South Korean constitution. In 1990 the assembly had 299 seats, 224 of which were directly elected from single-member districts in the general elections of April 1988. Under applicable laws, the remaining seventy-five representatives were elected from party lists. By law, candidates for election to the assembly must be at least thirty years of age. The National Assembly's term is four years. In a change from the more authoritarian Fourth Republic and Fifth Republic (1972–81 and 1981–87, respectively), under the Sixth Republic, the assembly cannot be dissolved by the president.

Although South Korea operates a presidential system, its Assembly functions with several parliamentary characteristics: organized party blocs, committee-centric deliberation, and executive oversight through questioning sessions and investigations. As noted in Shively's Power and Choice (2021), such institutional features align with the general traits of parliamentary systems, particularly in legislative specialization and collective accountability mechanisms.

== Building ==
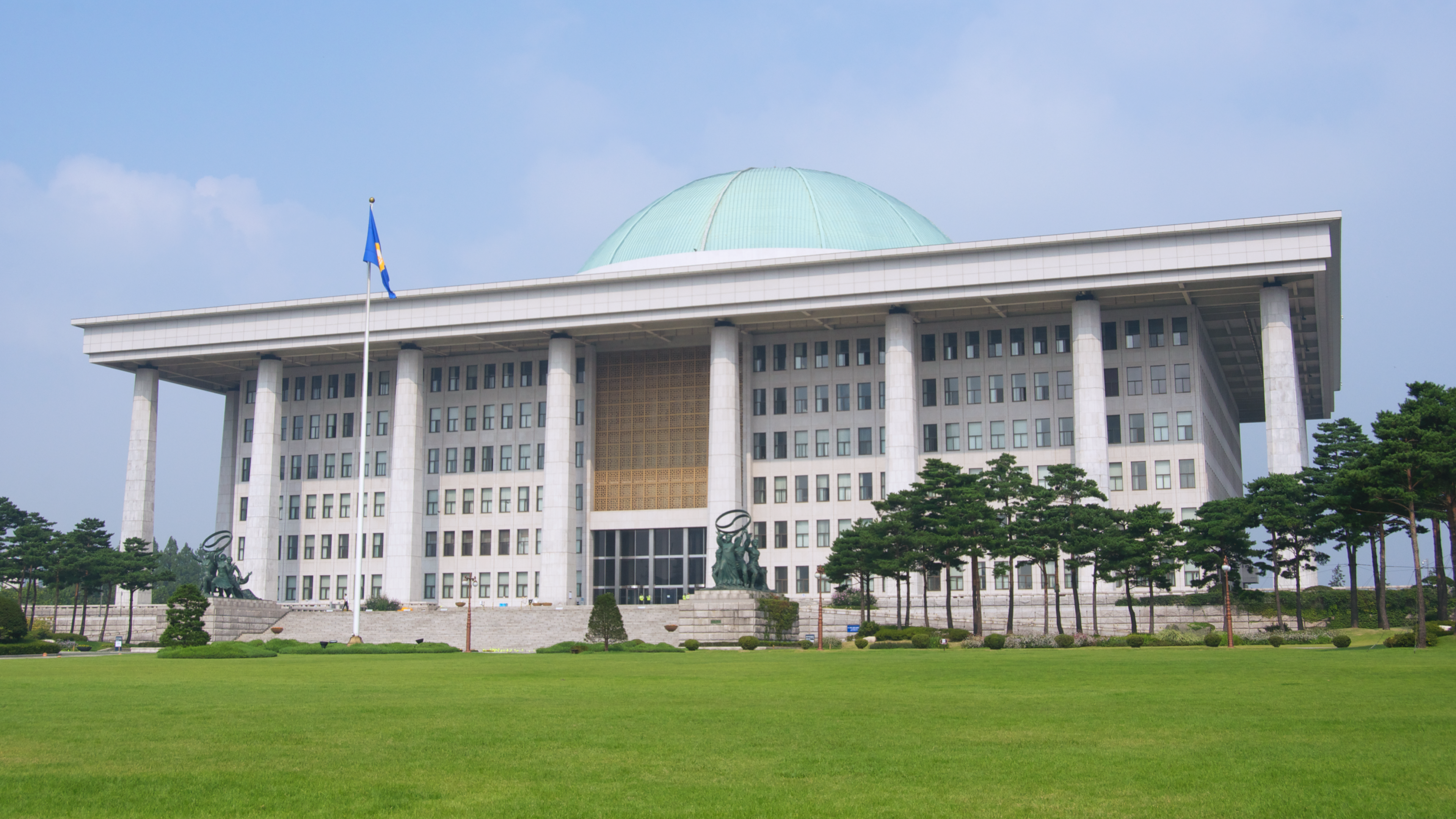
The National Assembly Building in Seoul

The main building in Yeouido, Seoul, is a stone structure with seven stories above ground and one story below ground. The building has 24 columns, which symbolise the legislature's promise to listen to people 24/7 throughout the year.

== Structure and appointment ==
=== Speaker ===
The constitution stipulates that the assembly is presided over by a Speaker and two Deputy Speakers, who are responsible for expediting the legislative process. The Speaker and Deputy Speakers are elected in a secret ballot by the members of the Assembly, and their term in office is restricted to two years. The Speaker is independent of party affiliation (to compared to the two vice-speakers who are affiliated with the two leading political parties), and the Speaker and Deputy Speakers may not simultaneously be government ministers.

By convention, the Speaker resigns from party leadership and adopts a formally neutral stance while presiding over sessions, while Vice-Speakers are usually selected from the leading opposition parties to preserve pluralism. The Speaker nominates the Secretary-General of the Assembly Secretariat, who is confirmed by a plenary vote. The Secretariat manages legislative research, records, and digital transparency platforms such as Assembly Plenary Broadcast and Bill Information System, which have increased accessibility and public engagement in recent years (National Assembly Secretariat, 2023).

The Secretary General of the National Assembly is the head of the Secretariat of the National Assembly, which is the department that oversees the affairs of the National Assembly. They are government officials and are treated as ministers. (Ministerial level). As with the President of the National Assembly, party membership is limited and they must be affiliated to no political party during their term in the Assembly.

=== Negotiation groups ===
Beyond its basic composition and legislative role, the National Assembly’s institutional structure reflects key procedural arrangements. Political parties holding at least twenty seats may form floor negotiation groups (교섭단체) under Article 33 of the National Assembly Act. These groups enjoy expanded rights, including priority in debate allocation, representation on the Steering Committee, and eligibility for additional state funding. The existence of negotiation groups contributes to Korea’s structured form of legislative politics, resembling parliamentary coordination even within a presidential system (National Assembly of the Republic of Korea, 2024).

Parties that hold at least 20 seats in the assembly form floor negotiation groups (교섭단체; 交涉團體), which are entitled to a variety of rights that are denied to smaller parties. These include a greater amount of state funding and participation in the leaders' summits that determine the assembly's legislative agenda.

In order to meet the quorum, the United Liberal Democrats, who then held 17 seats, arranged to "rent" three legislators from the Millennium Democratic Party. The legislators returned to the MDP after the collapse of the ULD-MDP coalition in September 2001.

=== Legislative process ===
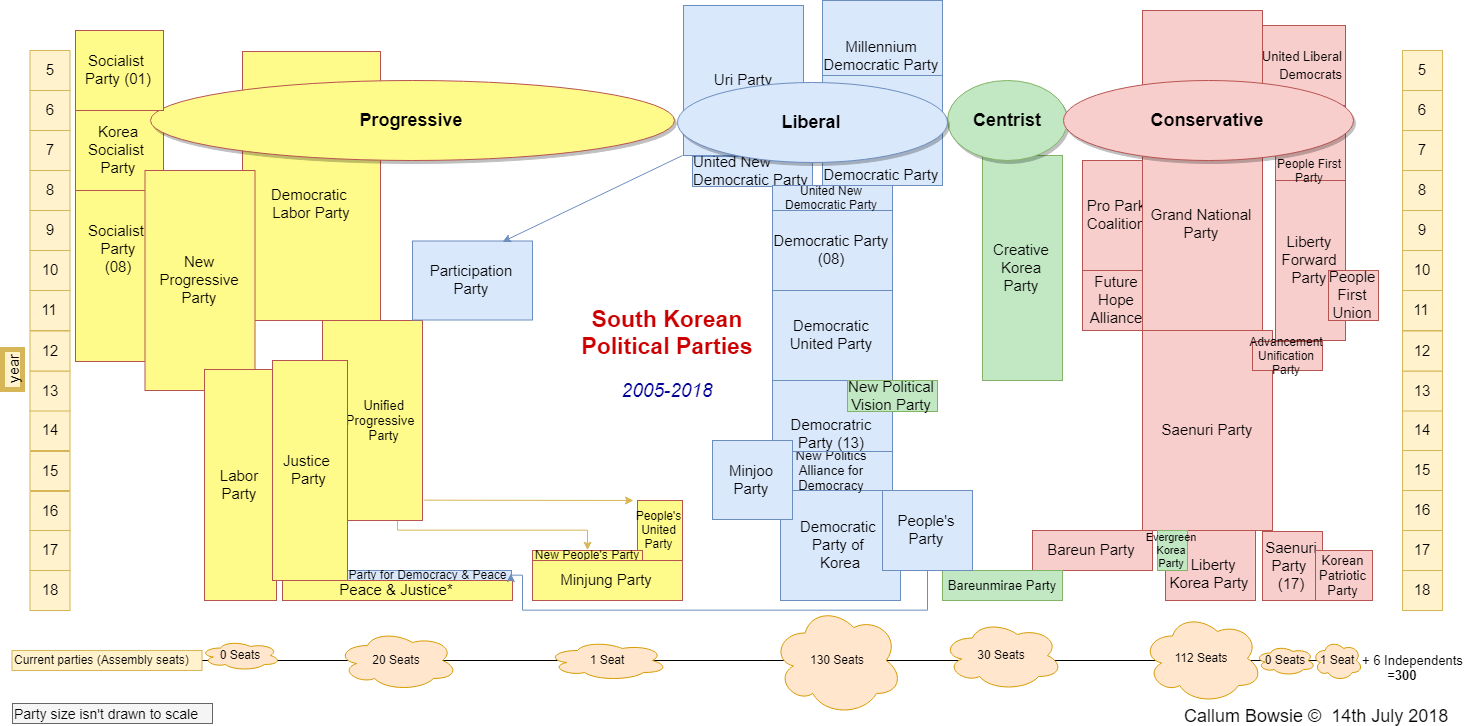
This graph traces the recent origins of all six main political parties currently in the Republic of Korea. All of which have either split from or merged with other parties in the last four years. They have emerged from four main ideological camps, from Left to Right: Progressive (socialist), liberal, centrist, and conservative.

For a legislator to introduce a bill, they must submit the proposal to the Speaker, accompanied by the signatures of at least ten other assembly members. A committee must then review the bill to verify that it employs precise and orderly language. Following this, the Assembly may either approve or reject the bill.

=== Committees ===
There are 17 standing committees which examine bills and petitions falling under their respective jurisdictions, and perform other duties as prescribed by relevant laws.

- House Steering Committee
- Legislation and Judiciary Committee
- National Policy Committee
- Strategy and Finance Committee
- Education Committee
- Science, ICT, Broadcasting and Communications Committee
- Foreign Affairs and Unification Committee
- National Defense Committee
- Public Administration and Security Committee
- Culture, Sports and Tourism Committee
- Agriculture, Food, Rural Affairs, Oceans and Fisheries Committee
- Trade, Industry, SMEs and Startups Committee
- Health and Welfare Committee
- Climate, Energy, Environment and Labor Committee
- Land Infrastructure and Transport Committee
- Intelligence Committee
- Gender Equality and Family Committee

Standing committees serve as the primary deliberative organs of the Assembly. Each committee corresponds to a policy domain—such as Strategy and Finance, Foreign Affairs and Unification, or Education—and is tasked with reviewing bills, conducting oversight, and managing legislative hearings. The Steering Committee functions as the central body for agenda coordination, enabling the majority party to exert significant influence over legislative scheduling (Inter-Parliamentary Union, 2022). Committee chairs are distributed proportionally among negotiation groups, though the ruling party typically retains control of key policy committees.

=== Election ===
Allocation of seats within the electoral system. Red and green: parallel voting; 253 FPTP and 17 PR seats. Blue: additional member system for 30 seats

The National Assembly has 300 seats, with 254 constituency seats under FPTP and 46 proportional representation seats. With electoral reform taken in 2019, the PR seats apportionment method was replaced by a variation of additional member system from the previous parallel voting system. However, 17 seats were temporarily assigned under parallel voting in the 2020 South Korean legislative election.

Per Article 189 of Public Official Election Act, the PR seats are awarded to parties that have either obtained at least 3% of the total valid votes in the legislative election or at least five constituency seats. The number of seats allocated to each eligible party is decided by the formula:

$$n_\text{initial} = \left\lfloor \frac{(n_{\text{Assembly}} - n_{\text{ineligibles}}) \times \text{PR votes ratio} - n_{\text{obtained constituencies}} + 1}{2}\right\rfloor$$

where

- n_{Assembly} = total number of seats in the National Assembly.
- n_{ineligibles} = number of seats obtained by ineligible parties and independents.
- n_{obtained constituencies} = number of constituency seats obtained by the party.
- n_{ams} = total number of seats allocated for additional member system.

If the integer is less than 1, then n_{initial} is set to 0 and the party does not get any seats. Then the sum of initially allocated seats is compared to the total seats for the additional member system and recalculated.

$$n_\text{remainder} = \left(n_\text{ams}-\sum n_\text{initial}\right) \times \text{PR votes ratio}$$

$$n_\text{final} =
\begin{cases}
n_\text{initial}+n_\text{remainder}, & \text{if }\sum n_\text{initial} < n_\text{ams} \\
n_\text{ams} \times \dfrac{n_\text{initial}}{\sum n_\text{initial}}, & \text{if }\sum n_\text{initial} > n_\text{ams}
\end{cases}$$

Final seats are assigned through the largest remainder method, and if the remainder is equal, the winner is determined by lottery among the relevant political parties.

The voting age was also lowered from 19 to 18 years old, expanding the electorate by over half a million voters.

== Legislative violence ==
From 2004 to 2009, the assembly gained notoriety as a frequent site for legislative violence. The Assembly first came to the world's attention during a violent dispute on impeachment proceedings for then President Roh Moo-hyun, when open physical combat took place in the assembly. Since then, it has been interrupted by periodic conflagrations, piquing the world's curiosity once again in 2009 when members battled each other with sledgehammers and fire extinguishers. The National Assembly since then has taken preventive measures to prevent any more legislative violence.

== Powers and limitations of the National Assembly ==
The Constitution of the Republic of Korea (Articles 40–65) vests legislative power in the National Assembly. The institution enacts and amends laws, approves national budgets, ratifies significant treaties, and exercises audit and investigation powers over executive agencies. It may initiate impeachment proceedings against senior officials, including the President, Prime Minister, and Constitutional Court judges, in cases of constitutional or statutory violations.

Despite these broad competencies, the Assembly’s powers are circumscribed by constitutional and political constraints. The President may veto legislation, which can only be overridden by a two-thirds majority of members present—an outcome rare in Korea’s competitive party landscape. While legislators can submit bills individually, most major initiatives originate in the executive branch, a reflection of bureaucratic dominance in policy design (Park, 2019). Additionally, time limits and agenda control—largely managed by the Steering Committee and the Speaker—enable the ruling party to prioritize government legislation over private members’ bills (IPU, 2022).

The Assembly’s oversight power is also bounded by its dependency on political cohesion. Although the Inspection of State Administration Act allows investigative hearings, their frequency and impact depend heavily on party alignment and electoral incentives. Furthermore, the Assembly lacks the parliamentary prerogative to dissolve the executive branch of the government or call for early elections, distinguishing it from classical Westminster models. These limitations reinforce a semi-parliamentary dynamic, where the legislature’s strength varies with party control and inter-branch negotiation.

== Party dynamics ==
Parties are the principal organizational units shaping legislative behaviour within the Assembly. Since democratization in 1987, the South Korean party system has evolved through cycles of fragmentation, mergers, and regional realignments. Floor negotiation groups institutionalize this party dominance, giving recognized parties control over committee seats, speaking time, and legislative budgets (Lee & Kim, 2020).

Party cohesion is maintained through strict whip systems and the influence of floor leaders, who coordinate voting strategies and manage relations with the executive. As noted by Kim and Baek (2021), polarization within the Assembly has increased, particularly between the liberal and conservative blocs, reducing instances of bipartisan cooperation. Divided government (when the President’s party lacks a majority) frequently produces legislative gridlock and policy delays, as occurred between 2020 and 2022.

In addition, internal factionalism remains a defining feature. Regional loyalties, generational differences, and ideological currents within major parties often determine committee leadership and the fate of reform bills. Electoral reforms in 2020 introduced semi-proportional representation, which prompted the creation of satellite parties designed to maximize seat gains under proportional rules. This adaptation illustrates the high degree of strategic institutional learning within Korean parties (Cho, 2020).

These dynamics reinforce that, while constitutionally presidential, South Korea’s legislature operates through mechanisms that mirror parliamentary competition and coalition bargaining. Thus, party alignment largely dictates policy output and determines the scope of executive-legislative cooperation.

== Public trust and perception ==
Public trust in the National Assembly remains low relative to other state institutions. According to the OECD Trust Survey (2024), only 21 % of South Koreans express high or moderate trust in the national parliament, one of the lowest rates in the OECD. Trust in political parties stands at 20 %, while trust in the national government overall averages 37 %, below the OECD mean of 39 % (OECD, 2024). Similarly, the OECD–KDI 2018 Report identified the Assembly as the least trusted national institution, citing perceptions of partisanship, conflict-driven politics, and low responsiveness to citizen concerns (OECD & KDI, 2018). Various analysts attribute this trust deficit to persistent legislative gridlock, the perception of excessive partisan confrontation, and limited citizen access to legislative processes. Statista data (2025) confirms a continuing decline in public confidence, correlating trust erosion with political polarization and low satisfaction with policy responsiveness.

Efforts to address the problem have focused on institutional transparency and citizen engagement. The Assembly has expanded open data services, live-streamed committee sessions, and introduced ethics reforms in order to improve accountability (National Assembly Secretariat, 2023). Civil society organizations have also advocated for lowering thresholds for negotiation group formation and enhancing participatory oversight mechanisms.

From a governance perspective, sustained low trust poses a risk to democratic legitimacy and policy compliance. However, increased digital transparency and institutional reform initiatives may gradually improve perceptions of legislative accountability and effectiveness in the coming decade.

== Historical composition ==
Progressive – Liberal – Conservative – Independent politician
| Election | Total seats | Composition |
| 1st (1948) | 200 | 1 / 29 / 85 / 1 / 1 / 1 / 1 / 1 / 1 / 1 / 1 / 1 / 1 / 2 / 6 / 12 / 55 |
| 2nd (1950) | 210 | 2 / 24 / 126 / 1 / 1 / 1 / 1 / 3 / 3 / 10 / 14 / 24 |
| 3rd (1954) | 203 | 15 / 67 / 1 / 3 / 3 / 114 |
| 4th (1958) | 233 | 79 / 26 / 1 / 127 |
| 5th (1960) | 233 | 4 / 1 / 175 / 49 / 1 / 1 / 2 |
| 6th (1963) | 175 | 40 / 14 / 2 / 9 / 110 |
| 7th (1967) | 175 | 1 / 45 / 129 |
| 8th (1971) | 204 | 1 / 89 / 1 / 113 |
| 9th (1973) | 219 | 2 / 52 / 19 / 146 |
| 10th (1978) | 231 | 3 / 61 / 22 / 145 |
| 11th (1981) | 276 | 2 / 81 / 2 / 11 / 1 / 1 / 2 / 25 / 151 |
| 12th (1985) | 276 | 1 / 67 / 35 / 1 / 4 / 20 / 148 |
| 13th (1988) | 299 | 1 / 70 / 59 / 9 / 35 / 125 |
| 14th (1992) | 299 | 97 / 21 / 1 / 31 / 149 |
| 15th (1996) | 299 | 79 / 15 / 16 / 50 / 139 |
| 16th (2000) | 273 | 115 / 5 / 17 / 1 / 2 / 133 |
| 17th (2004) | 299 | 10 / 152 / 2 / 9 / 1 / 4 / 121 |
| 18th (2008) | 299 | 5 / 81 / 3 / 25 / 18 / 153 / 14 |
| 19th (2012) | 300 | 13 / 127 / 3 / 5 / 152 |
| 20th (2016) | 300 | 6 / 123 / 11 / 38 / 122 |
| 21st (2020) | 300 | 6 / 3 / 180 / 5 / 3 / 103 |
| 22nd (2024) | 300 | 1 / 175 / 12 / 1 / 3 / 108 |

== History ==
=== First Republic ===
Elections for the assembly were held under UN supervision on 10 May 1948. The First Republic of Korea was established on 17 July 1948 when the constitution of the First Republic was established by the Assembly. The Assembly also had the job of electing the president and elected anti-communist Syngman Rhee as president on 20 July 1948.

Under the first constitution, the National Assembly was unicameral. Under the second and third constitutions, the National Assembly was to be bicameral and consist of the House of Representatives and the House of Councillors, but in practice, the legislature was unicameral because the House of Representatives was prevented from passing the law necessary to establish the House of Councillors.

Progressive Liberal Conservative

majority plurality only largest minority

| National Assembly | Majority Party | Majority Leader | Seats | Speaker | Seats | Minority Leaders | Minority Parties |
|---|---|---|---|---|---|---|---|
| 1st (1948) | NARRKI→NA | | 55 | 1948 Rhee Syng-man (supported by NARRKI); 1948–1950 Shin Ik-hee (supported by NARRKI until 1949) | 29 | | KDP→DNP |
| 1st (1948) | NARRKI→NA | | 55 | 1948 Rhee Syng-man (supported by NARRKI); 1948–1950 Shin Ik-hee (supported by NARRKI until 1949) | 116 | | others |
| 2nd (1950) | DNP | | 24 | Shin Ik-hee (supported by DNP) | 24 | | KNP |
| 2nd (1950) | DNP | | 24 | Shin Ik-hee (supported by DNP) | 14 | | NA |
| 2nd (1950) | DNP | | 24 | Shin Ik-hee (supported by DNP) | 148 | | others |
| 3rd (1954) | LP | | 114 | Yi Ki-bung (supported by LP) | 15 | | DNP→DP (55) |
| 3rd (1954) | LP | | 114 | Yi Ki-bung (supported by LP) | 3 | | NA |
| 3rd (1954) | LP | | 114 | Yi Ki-bung (supported by LP) | 3 | | KNP |
| 3rd (1954) | LP | | 114 | Yi Ki-bung (supported by LP) | 68 | | others |
| 4th (1958) | LP | | 126 | Yi Ki-bung (supported by LP) | 79 | | DP (55) |
| 4th (1958) | LP | | 126 | Yi Ki-bung (supported by LP) | 28 | | others |

=== Second Republic ===
| House of Representatives | Majority Party | Majority Leader | Seats | Speaker | Seats | Minority Leaders | Minority Parties |
|---|---|---|---|---|---|---|---|
| 5th (1960) | DP (55) | | 175 | Kwak Sang-hoon (supported by DP (55)) | 58 | | Others |

| House of Councillors | Majority Party | Majority Leader | Seats | President | Seats | Minority Leaders | Minority Parties |
|---|---|---|---|---|---|---|---|
| 5th (1960) | DP (55) | | 31 | Paek Nak-chun (supported by DP (55)) | 27 | | Others |

=== Third Republic ===
Since the reopening of the National Assembly in 1963 until today, it has been unicameral.

| National Assembly | Majority Party | Majority Leader | Seats | Speaker | Seats | Minority Leaders | Minority Parties |
|---|---|---|---|---|---|---|---|
| 6th (1963) | DRP | | 110 | Lee Hyu-sang (supported by DRP) | 41 | | CRP→DRP→NDP |
| 6th (1963) | DRP | | 110 | Lee Hyu-sang (supported by DRP) | 13 | | DP (55)→DRP→NDP |
| 7th (1967) | DRP | | 129 | Lee Hyu-sang (supported by DRP) | 45 | | NDP |
| 8th (1971) | DRP | | 113 | Baek Du-jin (supported by DRP) | 89 | | NDP |

=== Fourth Republic ===
| National Assembly | Majority Party | Majority Leader | Seats | Speaker | Seats | Minority Leaders | Minority Parties |
|---|---|---|---|---|---|---|---|
| 9th (1973) | DRP+Presidential appointees | | 146 | Chung Il-kwon (supported by DRP) | 52 | | NDP |
| 10th (1978) | DRP+Presidential appointees ↓ KNP | | 145 | 1978–1979 Chung Il-kwon (supported by DRP); 1979 Baek Du-jin (supported by DRP) | 61 | | NDP |

=== Fifth Republic ===
| National Assembly | Majority Party | Majority Leader | Seats | Speaker | Seats | Minority Leaders | Minority Parties |
|---|---|---|---|---|---|---|---|
| 11th (1981) | DJP | | 151 | 1981–1983 Chung Rae-hyung (supported by DJP); 1983–1985 Chae Mun-shik (supported by DJP) | 81 | | DKP |
| 11th (1981) | DJP | | 151 | 1981–1983 Chung Rae-hyung (supported by DJP); 1983–1985 Chae Mun-shik (supported by DJP) | 25 | | KNP |
| 12th (1985) | DJP | | 148 | Lee Jae-hyung (supported by DJP) | 67 | | NKDP |
| 12th (1985) | DJP | | 148 | Lee Jae-hyung (supported by DJP) | 35 | | DKP |
| 12th (1985) | DJP | | 148 | Lee Jae-hyung (supported by DJP) | 20 | | KNP |

=== Sixth Republic ===
majority plurality largest minority

| Term (Election) | Speaker | Conservative current: PPP | Liberal current: DP | Progressive current: PP | Miscellaneous right | Miscellaneous left | Independent |
|---|---|---|---|---|---|---|---|
| 13th (1988) | Kim Jae-sun (1988–90); Park Jyun-kyu (1990–92) | 125 | 70 | — | 36 | 59 | 9 |
| 14th (1992) | Park Jyun-kyu (1992–93); Hwang Nak-joo (1993); Lee Man-sup (1993–94); Park Jyun-kyu (1994–96) | 149 | 97 | — | — | 31 | 21 |
| 15th (1996) | Kim Soo-han (1996–98); Park Jyun-kyu (1998–00) | 139 | 79 | — | 65 | — | 16 |
| 16th (2000) | Lee Man-sup (2000–02); Park Kwan-yong (2002–04) | 133 | 115 | — | 20 | — | 5 |
| 17th (2004) | Kim Won-ki (2004–06); Lim Chae-jung (2006–08) | 121 | 152 | 10 | 4 | 9 | 3 |
| 18th (2008) | Kim Hyong-o (2008–10); Park Hee-tae (2010–12); Chung Eui-hwa (2012) | 153 | 81 | 5 | 32 | 3 | 25 |
| 19th (2012) | Kang Chang-hee (2012–14); Chung Ui-hwa (2014–16) | 152 | 127 | 13 | 5 | — | 3 |
| 20th (2016) | Chung Sye-kyun (2016–18); Moon Hee-sang (2018–20) | 122 | 123 | 6 | — | 38 | 11 |
| 21st (2020) | Park Byeong-seug (2020–22); Kim Jin-pyo (2022–24) | 103 | 180 | 6 | 3 | 3 | 5 |
| 22nd (2024) | Woo Won-shik (2024–26) | 108 | 171 | 3 | 3 | 15 | 0 |

== Members ==
- List of members of the South Korean Constituent Assembly
- List of members of the National Assembly (South Korea), 1950–1954
- List of members of the National Assembly (South Korea), 1954–1958
- List of members of the National Assembly (South Korea), 1981–1985
- List of members of the National Assembly (South Korea), 1985–1988
- List of members of the National Assembly (South Korea), 1988–1992
- List of members of the National Assembly (South Korea), 1992–1996
- List of members of the National Assembly (South Korea), 1996–2000
- List of members of the National Assembly (South Korea), 2000–2004
- List of members of the National Assembly (South Korea), 2004–2008
- List of members of the National Assembly (South Korea), 2008–2012
- List of members of the National Assembly (South Korea), 2012–2016
- List of members of the National Assembly (South Korea), 2016–2020
- List of members of the National Assembly (South Korea), 2020–2024
- List of members of the National Assembly (South Korea), 2024–2028

== Symbols ==
Emblem of the National Assembly (1947–2014)

Flag of the National Assembly (1947–2014)

Flag of the National Assembly (from 2014)

== See also ==
- List of political parties in South Korea
- Politics of South Korea
- National Assembly TV
- Supreme People's Assembly, the North Korean legislature
- 2019 South Korean National Assembly attack
- 2024 South Korean martial law crisis
