= 1954 South Korean legislative election =

- 20 May 1954

All 203 seats to the House of Representatives 102 seats needed for a majority
- Turnout: 91.14% (▼0.77pp)
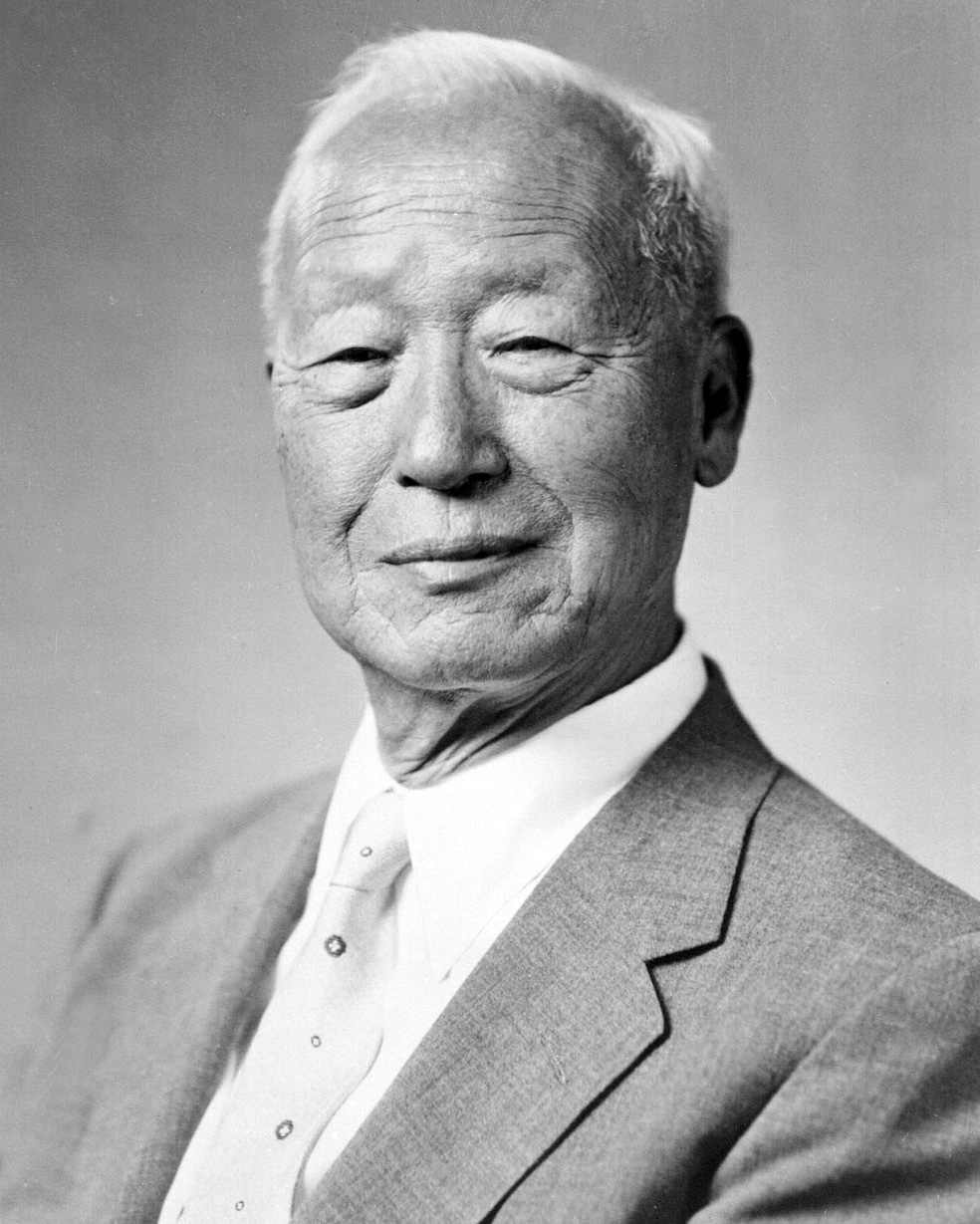

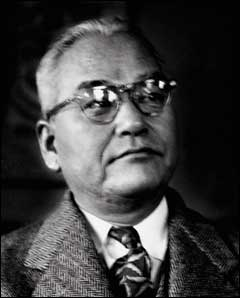
	Majority party	Minority party
Leader	Syngman Rhee	Sin Ik-hui
Party	Liberal	Democratic Nationalist
Leader since	17 December 1951	10 February 1949
Last election	–	24 seats
Seats won	114	15
Seat change	New	▼9
Popular vote	2,756,081	593,499
Percentage	36.79%	7.92%
Swing	New	▼1.87pp
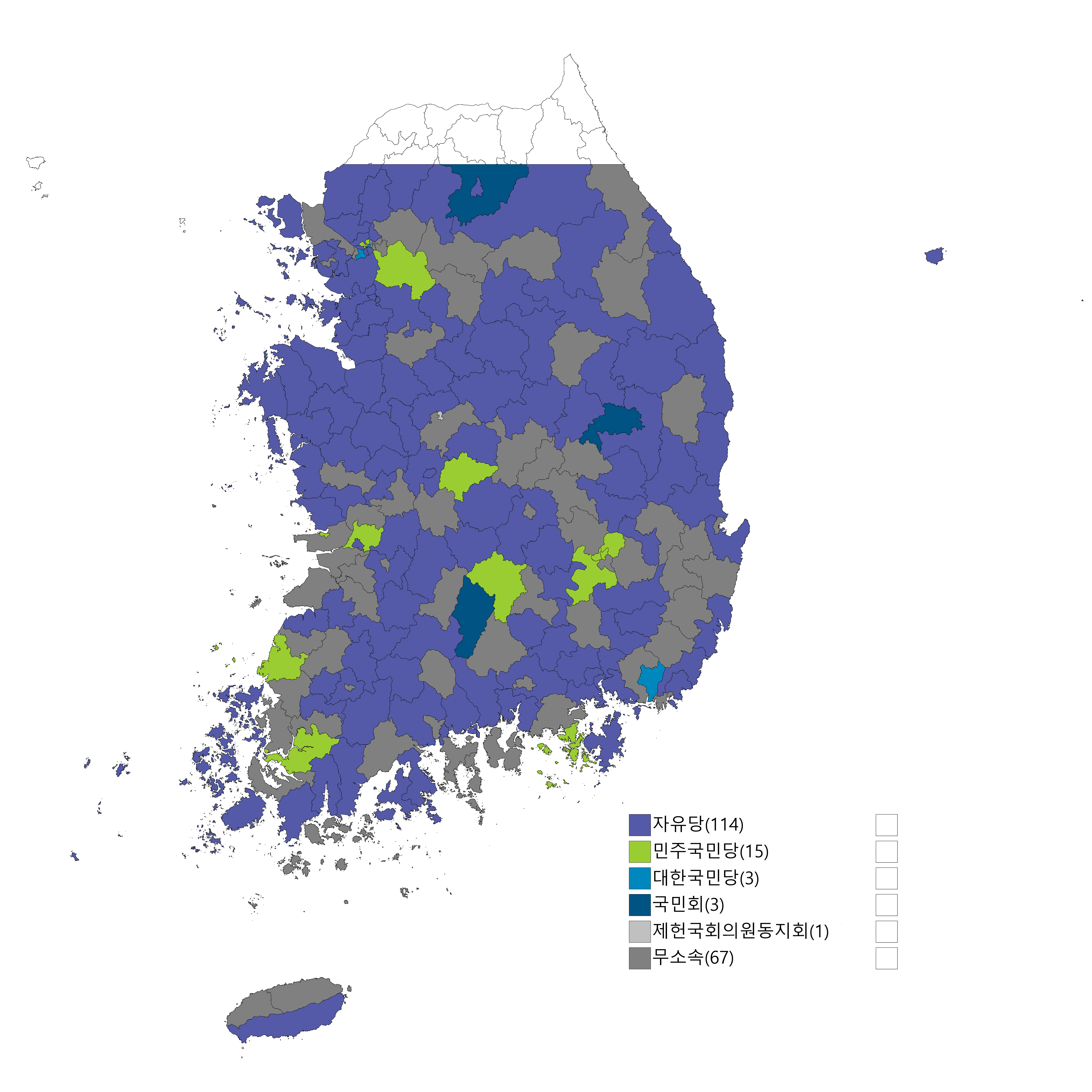
- Results by constituency
Speaker before election
Shin Ik-hee
National Association
Elected Speaker
Lee Ki-poong
Liberal

Legislative elections were held in South Korea on 20 May 1954. The result was a victory for Syngman Rhee's Liberal Party, which won 114 of the 203 seats. Voter turnout was 91.1%.

== Electoral system ==
The elections were held under first-past-the-post voting.

== Results ==
Graph of the party split among 203 seats.
Party	Votes	%	Seats	+/–
Liberal Party	2,756,061	36.79	114	New
Democratic Nationalist Party	593,499	7.92	15	–9
National Association	192,109	2.56	3	–11
Korea Nationalist Party	72,923	0.97	3	–21
Other parties	286,097	3.82	0	–
Independents	3,591,617	47.94	68	–58
Total	7,492,306	100.00	203	–7
Valid votes	7,492,306	97.32		
Invalid/blank votes	206,082	2.68		
Total votes	7,698,388	100.00		
Registered voters/turnout	8,446,509	91.14		
Source: Nohlen et al.

=== Results by city/province ===
Region	Total seats	Seats won					
Region	Total seats	LP	DNP	NA	KNP	Other	Ind.
Seoul	16	5	3	0	2	0	6
Gyeonggi	23	15	1	0	0	0	7
Gangwon	12	8	0	1	0	0	3
North Chungcheong	12	8	1	0	0	1	2
South Chungcheong	19	17	0	0	0	0	2
North Jeolla	22	10	2	0	0	0	10
South Jeolla	30	15	3	0	0	0	12
North Gyeongsang	34	15	3	1	0	0	15
South Gyeongsang	32	17	3	1	0	0	11
Jeju	3	1	0	0	0	0	2
Total	203	111	16	3	2	1	70
Source: National Election Commission

== See also ==
- Third National Assembly
