= Democratic Republican Party (South Korea) =

1963–1980 political party in South Korea

Democratic Republican Party 민주공화당 民主共和黨
- Leader: Park Chung Hee (1963–1979); Kim Jong-pil (1979–1980)
- Founder: Kim Jong-pil
- Founded: 26 February 1963
- Dissolved: 27 October 1980
- Preceded by: Reconstruction Party
- Succeeded by: Democratic Justice Party (de facto)
- Headquarters: Seoul
- Ideology: Korean nationalism; State nationalism; Conservatism (South Korean); Corporatism; Corporate statism; Anti-communism
- Political position: Far-right
- Colours: Brown
- Anthem: "민주공화당 당가" (Song of Democratic Republican Party)

Election symbol

Party flag

- Democratic Republican Party
- Hangul: 민주공화당
- Hanja: 民主共和黨
- RR: Minju gonghwadang
- MR: Minju konghwadang

The Democratic Republican Party (DRP; Korean: 민주공화당) was a conservative, broadly corporatist and nationalist political party in South Korea, ruling from shortly after its formation in 1963 to its dissolution under Chun Doo-hwan in 1980.

== History ==
Under the control of Park Chung Hee, President of South Korea from his military coup d'état of 1961 until his assassination in 1979, the party oversaw a period of corporatism, state capitalism, and developmentalism, known as the "Miracle of the Han River", where a predominantly poor and agrarian country was transformed into an industrial "tiger economy". The combination of state and corporate chaebol power pioneered by the party continues to be deeply built into the foundations of the South Korean economic system.

Following the promulgation in October 1972 of the Yushin Constitution, which implemented numerous authoritarian centralizing measures such as the direct appointment of a third of the National Assembly by the President, the DRP assumed an unprecedented level of political power. For the next eight years, South Korea was essentially a one-party state ruled by the DRP.

After Park's assassination on 26 October 1979 and the seizure of power by Chun Doo-hwan in the coup d'état of December Twelfth, the DRP was dissolved on 1 September 1980, and nominally superseded by the Korean National Party. However, leadership of the state was assumed by the Democratic Justice Party, formed in January 1981, which is seen as the spiritual successor of the DRP in terms of its constitutional vision and mimicking of Park's leadership style, beside the different economic approach. Through evolution, the Grand National Party is seen by many as the modern heir to the DRP, though the policies advocated by South Korean conservatives have changed significantly since South Korea's democratization in the late 1980s and early 1990s.

== Election results ==
=== President ===
Election	Candidate	Votes	%	Result
1963	Park Chung Hee	4,702,640	46.65	Elected
1967	Park Chung Hee	5,688,666	51.44	Elected
1971	Park Chung Hee	6,342,828	53.2	Elected
1972	Park Chung Hee	2,357	100	Elected
1978	Park Chung Hee	2,578	100	Elected

=== Legislature ===
Election	Leader	Votes	%	Seats				Position	Status
Election	Leader	Votes	%	Constituency	Party list	Total	+/–	Position	Status
1963	Park Chung Hee	3,112,985	33.48	88 / 131	22 / 44	110 / 175	new	1st	Government
1967	Park Chung Hee	5,494,922	50.62	102 / 131	27 / 44	129 / 175	▲19	1st	Government
1971	Park Chung Hee	5,460,581	48.77	86 / 153	27 / 51	113 / 204	▼16	1st	Government
1973	Park Chung Hee	4,251,754	38.68			73 / 146	▼40	1st	Government
1978	Park Chung Hee	4,695,995	31.7			68 / 154	▼5	1st	Government
