= 1963 South Korean presidential election =

- 15 October 1963
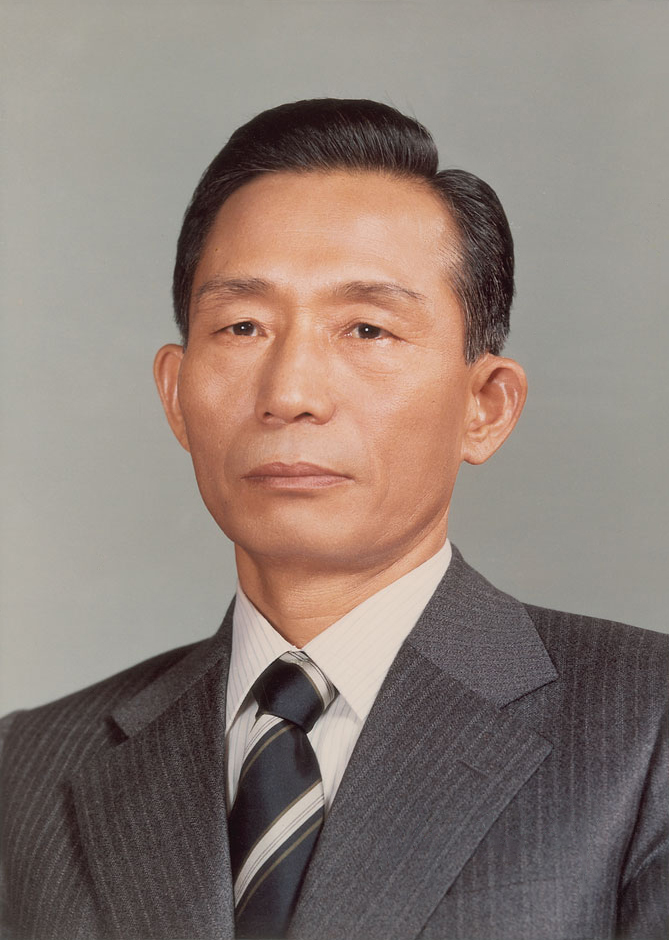

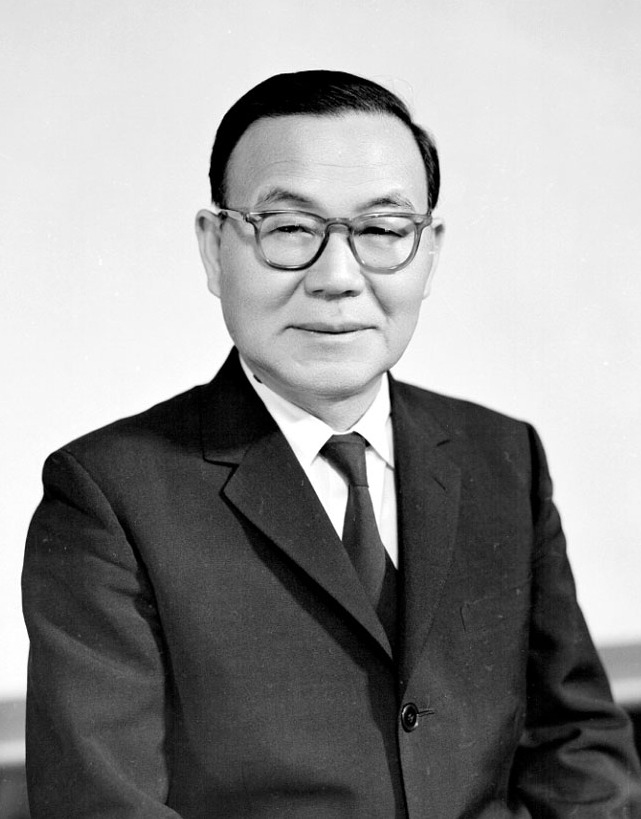
Nominee	Park Chung Hee	Yun Po-sun
Party	Democratic Republican	Civil Rule
Popular vote	4,702,640	4,546,614
Percentage	46.65%	45.10%
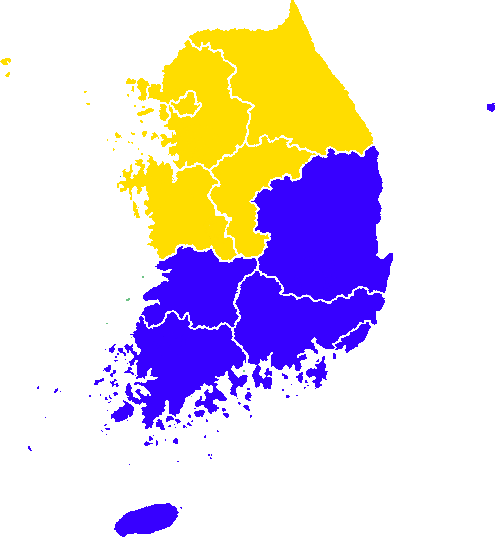
President before election
Park Chung Hee (acting)
Democratic Republican
Elected President
Park Chung Hee
Democratic Republican

Presidential elections were held in South Korea on 15 October 1963. They were the first elections since the 1961 May Coup, and the first during the Third Republic. The result was a narrow victory for the acting incumbent and leader of the governing military Supreme Council for National Reconstruction, Park Chung Hee, who received 47% of the vote, securing a transition to civilian rule under his Democratic Republican Party. The total voter turnout was 85%. As of 2025, this remains the only direct presidential election in which the winning candidate did not also come first place in bellwether North Chungcheong Province.

The elections were marked by a number of irregularities.

== Background ==
General Park Chung Hee, who had led the military government of South Korea since his coup in 1961, agreed to return the power to civil politicians on 8 April 1963, at the same time as announcing he would run for the presidency of the new civilian government. This was after he announced his plans to extend the military rule for another four years, to which United States reacted by threatening to cease all economic aid.

== Nominations ==
=== Military ===
The military formed the Democratic Republican Party in February, and Park Chung Hee, who had officially retired from military service the day before, accepted DRP nomination for president in October.

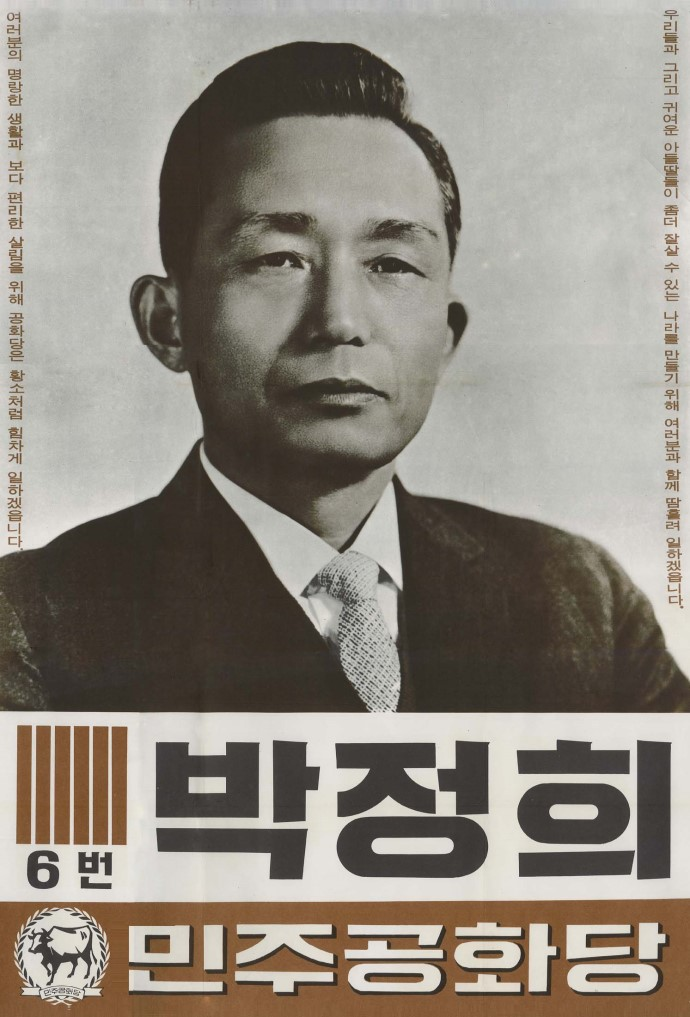

On 3 September, members of the military that were critical of Park's dictatorial behaviour split and formed the Liberal Democratic Party (LDP), nominating former Chief of Staff of the Army and former interim prime minister Song Yo-chan for president. Members of the party were oppressed by the government for doing this. Song later withdrew and endorsed Yun Po-sun.

=== Civilian ===
Civilian politicians were deeply divided into multiple parties rather than unifying against Park. On 14 May, Former President Yun Po-sun and his followers founded the Civil Rule Party (CRP), which nominated Yun as its presidential candidate. Also claiming to represent the civilian politicians was the New Politics Party (NPP), which nominated former Prime Minister Heo Jeong as its candidate.

When it became clear that Park would win easily if both candidates ran, Yun suggested that the civilians unite under one party, which the NPP agreed to. The People's Party (PP) was officially founded in September, uniting the CRP, NPP and Democratic Friendship Party of former Prime Minister Lee Beom-seok. However, after failing to reach an agreement on whether to nominate Yun or Heo for president, on 13 September, the Civil Rule Party split from the PP and officially re-nominated Yun for president. The factions of Heo and Lee, which remained in the PP, nominated Heo.

On 2 October, Heo withdrew his bid for presidency and endorsed Yun, hoping to help defeat Park, which ultimately resulted in failure.

== Results ==
Candidate	Party	Votes	%
Park Chung Hee	Democratic Republican Party	4,702,640	46.65
Yun Po-sun	Civil Rule Party	4,546,614	45.10
Oh Jae-young	Independent	408,664	4.05
Pyon Yong-tae	Righteous Citizens Party	224,443	2.23
Jang I-seok	New Development Party	198,837	1.97
Total		10,081,198	100.00
Valid votes		10,081,198	91.35
Invalid/blank votes		954,977	8.65
Total votes		11,036,175	100.00
Registered voters/turnout		12,985,051	84.99
Source: Nohlen et al.

=== By province and city ===
Province/City	Park Chung Hee		Yun Po-sun		Oh Jae-young		Pyon Yong-tae		Jang I-seok	
Province/City	Votes	%	Votes	%	Votes	%	Votes	%	Votes	%
Seoul	371,627	30.17	802,052	65.12	20,634	1.68	26,728	2.17	10,537	0.86
Busan	242,779	48.21	239,038	47.47	11,214	2.23	7,106	1.41	3,419	0.68
Gyeonggi	384,764	33.06	661,984	56.88	54,770	4.71	34,775	2.99	27,554	2.37
Gangwon	296,711	39.57	368,092	49.09	35,568	4.74	24,924	3.32	24,528	3.27
North Chungcheong	202,789	39.78	249,397	48.92	26,911	5.28	15,699	3.08	14,971	2.94
South Chungcheong	405,077	40.79	490,663	49.41	47,364	4.77	26,639	2.68	23,359	2.35
North Jeolla	408,556	50.04	343,171	42.03	27,906	3.42	18,617	2.28	18,223	2.23
South Jeolla	765,712	57.22	480,800	35.93	51,714	3.86	17,312	1.29	22,604	1.69
North Gyeongsang	837,124	55.65	543,392	36.12	58,079	3.86	31,113	2.07	34,622	2.30
South Gyeongsang	706,079	61.18	341,971	29.63	60,645	5.26	19,323	1.67	26,014	2.25
Jeju	81,422	69.89	26,009	22.32	3,859	3.31	2,207	1.89	3,006	2.58
Total	4,702,640	46.65	4,546,614	45.10	408,664	4.05	224,443	2.23	198,837	1.97
