= 1971 South Korean legislative election =

- 25 May 1971

All 204 seats to the National Assembly 103 seats needed for a majority
- Turnout: 73.22% (▼2.90pp)
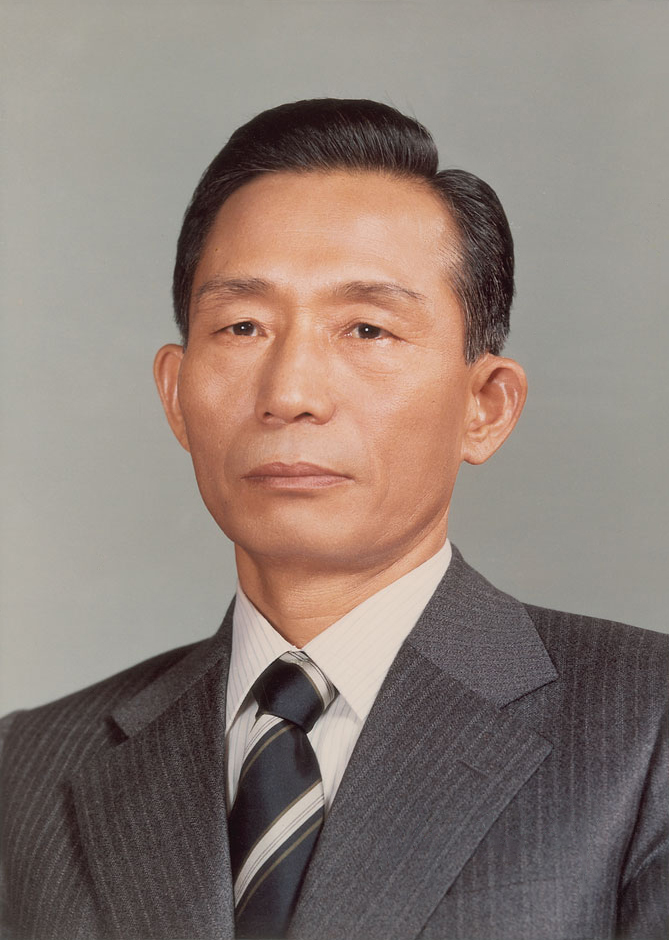

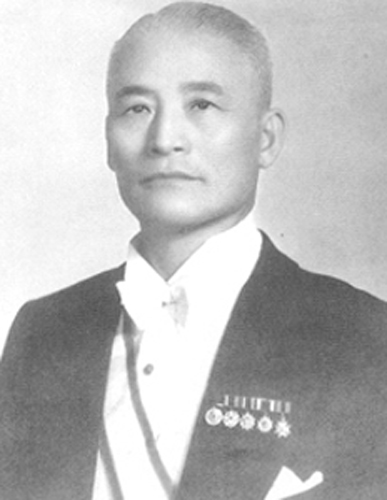
| | Majority party | Minority party |
|---|---|---|
| Leader | Park Chung Hee | Kim Hong-il |
| Party | Democratic Republican | New Democratic |
| Last election | 129 seats | 45 seats |
| Seats won | 113 | 89 |
| Seat change | ▼16 | ▲44 |
| Popular vote | 5,460,581 | 4,969,050 |
| Percentage | 48.77% | 44.38% |
| Swing | ▼1.85pp | ▲11.64p |
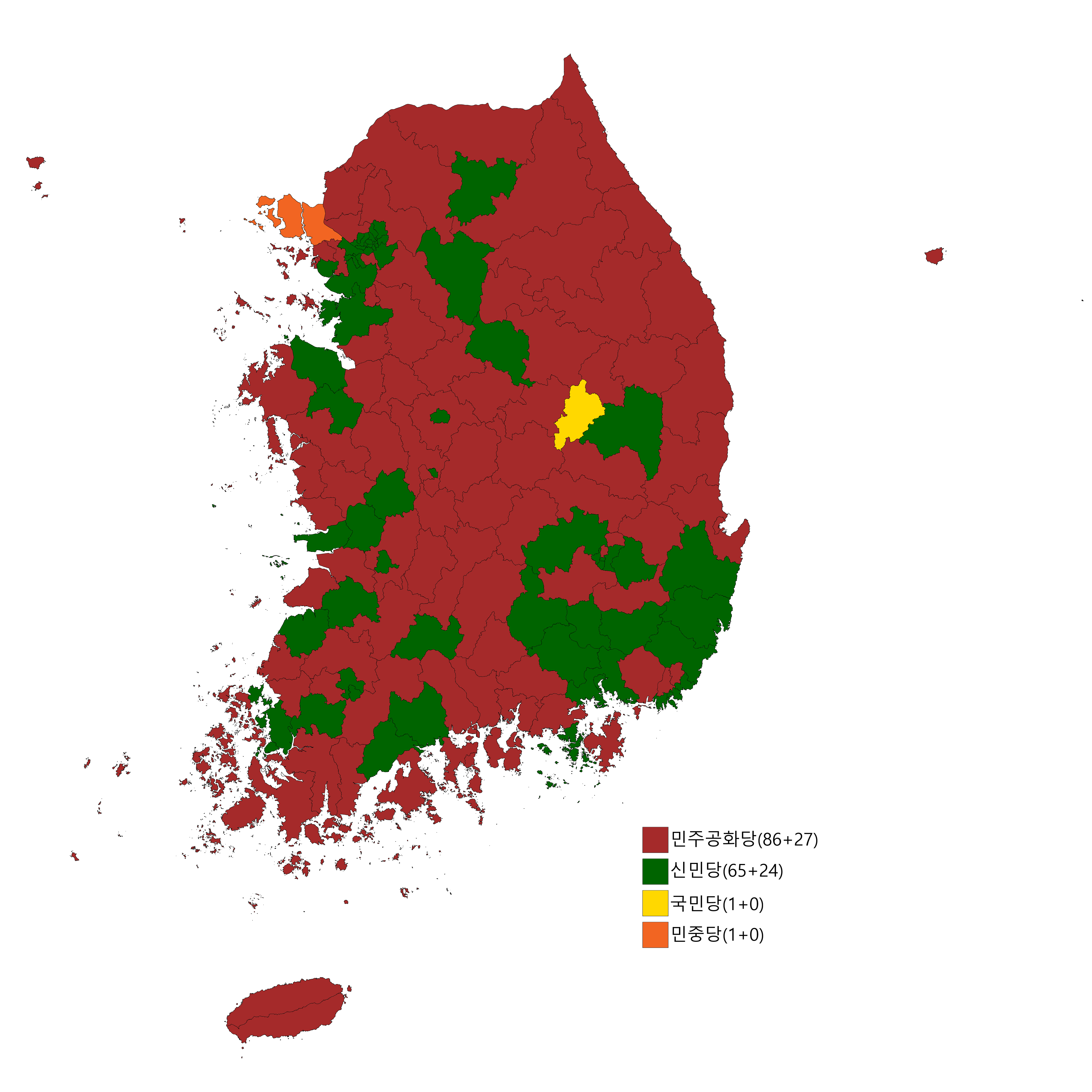
Speaker before election
Lee Hyo Sang
Democratic Republican
Elected Speaker
Baek Du-jin
Democratic Republican

Legislative elections were held in South Korea on 25 May 1971. The result was a victory for the Democratic Republican Party, which won 113 of the 204 seats in the National Assembly. Voter turnout was 73.2%.

== Electoral system ==
The unicameral National Assembly was elected by parallel voting, with 153 legislators elected in single-member constituencies and 51 allocated via a modified formula on the national level, excluding parties that did not win more than three seats or more than 5% of the valid vote. If the percentage of votes for the first-placed party was over 50%, the national seats would be allocated in proportion to vote share, with the first-placed party being limited to two-thirds of the available national seats (it would then be eliminated from further consideration for national seats). When the number of votes of the top party was less than 50%, half of the seats in the national constituency were automatically allocated to the first-placed party (which was then eliminated from further consideration for national seats), and the process repeated for the remaining parties (meaning the second place party would now be considered the "top party" for purposes of the next allocation) until all remaining seats were allocated.

== Results ==
Graph of the party split among 204 seats.
| Party | Votes | % | Seats | | | |
| Party | Votes | % | FPTP | PR | Total | +/– |
|---|---|---|---|---|---|---|
| Democratic Republican Party | 5,460,581 | 48.77 | 86 | 27 | 113 | –16 |
| New Democratic Party | 4,969,050 | 44.38 | 65 | 24 | 89 | +44 |
| National Party | 454,257 | 4.06 | 1 | 0 | 1 | New |
| People's Party | 155,277 | 1.39 | 1 | 0 | 1 | +1 |
| Democratic Socialist Party | 97,398 | 0.87 | 0 | 0 | 0 | 0 |
| Mass Party | 59,359 | 0.53 | 0 | 0 | 0 | –1 |
| Total | 11,195,922 | 100.00 | 153 | 51 | 204 | +29 |
| Valid votes | 11,195,922 | 97.95 | | | | |
| Invalid/blank votes | 234,280 | 2.05 | | | | |
| Total votes | 11,430,202 | 100.00 | | | | |
| Registered voters/turnout | 15,610,258 | 73.22 | | | | |
Source: Nohlen et al.

=== By city/province ===
| Region | Total seats | Seats won | | | |
| Region | Total seats | DRP | NDP | NP | PP |
|---|---|---|---|---|---|
| Seoul | 19 | 1 | 18 | 0 | 0 |
| Busan | 8 | 2 | 6 | 0 | 0 |
| Gyeonggi | 16 | 11 | 4 | 0 | 1 |
| Gangwon | 9 | 8 | 1 | 0 | 0 |
| North Chungcheong | 8 | 6 | 2 | 0 | 0 |
| South Chungcheong | 15 | 11 | 4 | 0 | 0 |
| North Jeolla | 12 | 6 | 6 | 0 | 0 |
| South Jeolla | 22 | 15 | 7 | 0 | 0 |
| North Gyeongsang | 24 | 15 | 8 | 1 | 0 |
| South Gyeongsang | 18 | 9 | 9 | 0 | 0 |
| Jeju | 2 | 2 | 0 | 0 | 0 |
| Constituency total | 153 | 86 | 65 | 1 | 1 |
| PR list | 51 | 27 | 24 | 0 | 0 |
| Total | 204 | 113 | 89 | 1 | 1 |
