= 1963 South Korean legislative election =

- 26 November 1963

All 175 seats in the National Assembly 88 seats needed for a majority
- Turnout: 72.11% (▼12.24pp)
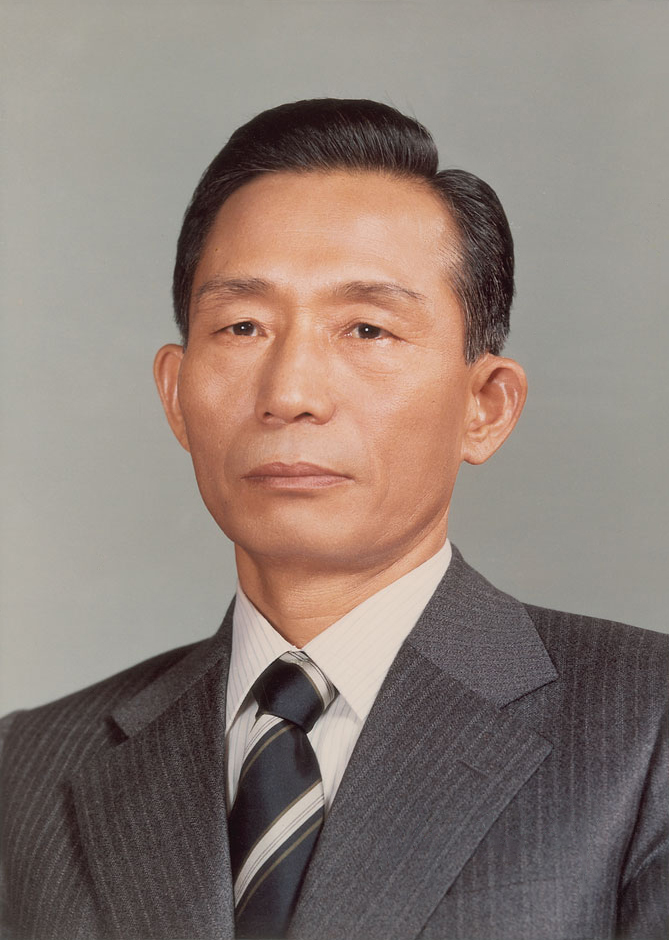

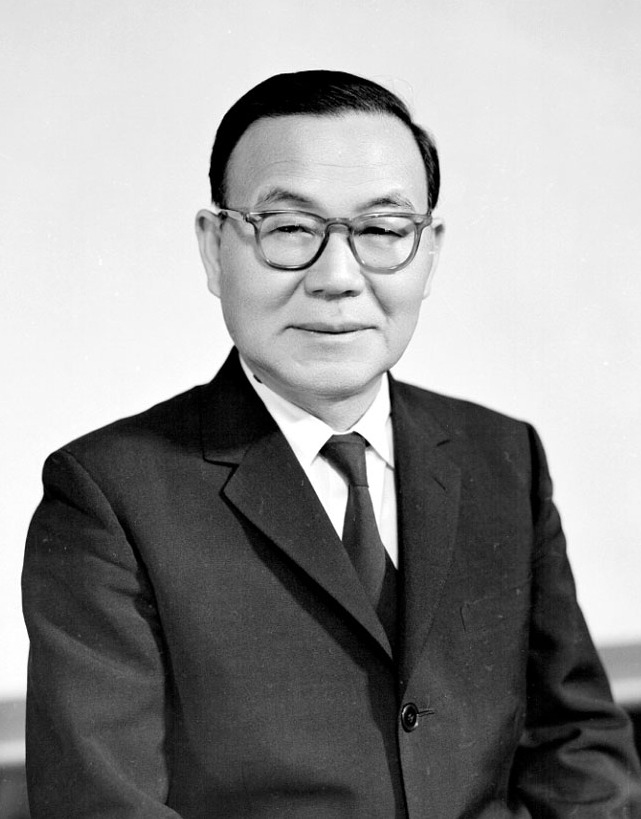

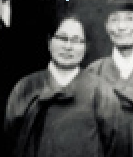

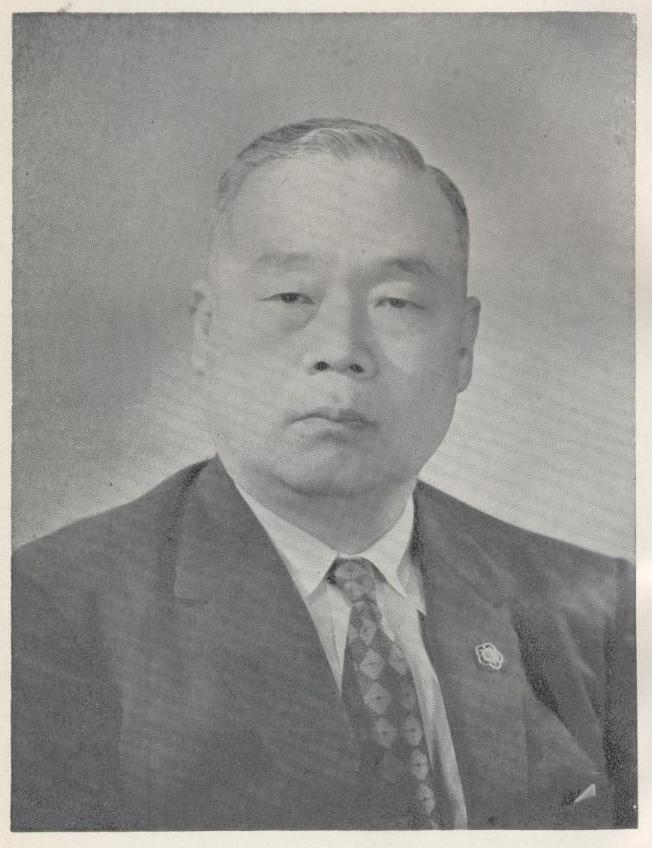
	Majority party	Minority party	Third party
Leader	Park Chung Hee	Yun Po-sun	Park Soon-cheon
Party	Democratic Republican	Civil Rule	Democratic
Seats won	110	41	13
Popular vote	3,112,985	1,870,976	1,252,827
Percentage	33.48%	20.12%	13.60%
	Fourth party	Fifth party
Leader	Kim Byeong-ro	Kim Chun-yon
Party	People's	Liberal Democratic
Seats won	2	9
Popular vote	822,000	752,026
Percentage	8.84%	8.09%
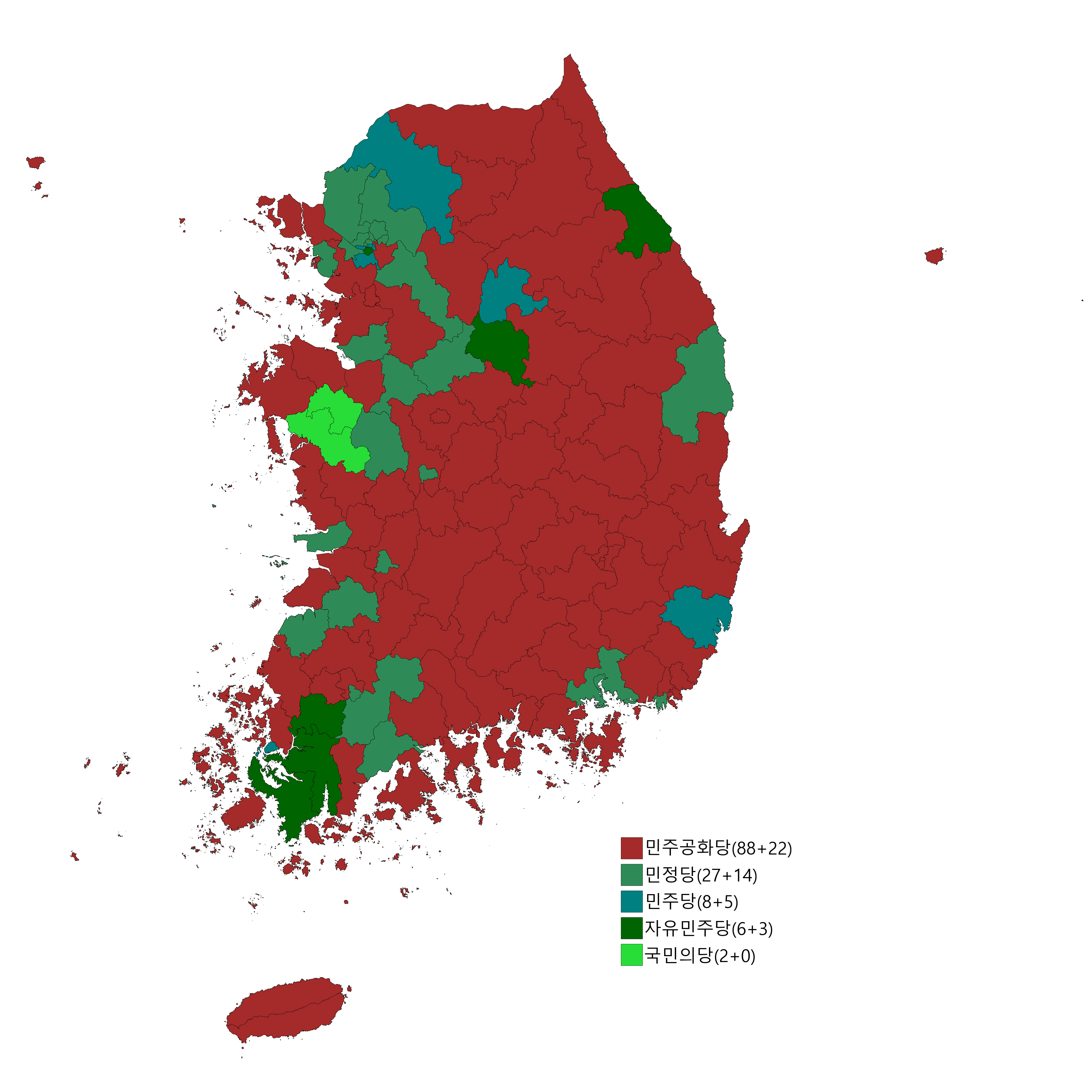
- Results by constituency
Speaker before election
None
Elected Speaker
None

Legislative elections were held in South Korea on 26 November 1963. They were the first held after the 1961 coup and subsequent approval of a new constitution the previous December, which inaugurated the Third Republic. All candidates had to run under the banner of a political party.

The result was a victory for the Democratic Republican Party of coup leader Park Chung Hee, which won 110 of the 175 seats in the National Assembly. Voter turnout was 72.1%.

== Electoral system ==
The unicameral National Assembly was elected by parallel voting, with 131 legislators elected in single-member constituencies and 44 allocated via a modified formula on the national level, excluding parties that did not win more than three seats or more than 5% of the valid vote. If the percentage of votes for the first-placed party was over 50%, the national seats would be allocated in proportion to vote share, with the first-placed party being limited to two-thirds of the available national seats (it would then be eliminated from further consideration for national seats). When the number of votes of the top party was less than 50%, half of the seats in the national constituency were automatically allocated to the first-placed party (which was then eliminated from further consideration for national seats), and the process repeated for the remaining parties (meaning the second place party would now be considered the "top party" for purposes of the next allocation) until all remaining seats were allocated.

== Results ==
Graph of the party split among 175 seats.
Party	Votes	%	Seats			
Party	Votes	%	FPTP	PR	Total	+/–
Democratic Republican Party	3,112,985	33.48	88	22	110	New
Civil Rule Party	1,870,976	20.12	27	14	41	New
Democratic Party	1,264,285	13.60	8	5	13	–162
People's Party	822,000	8.84	2	0	2	New
Liberal Democratic Party	752,026	8.09	6	3	9	New
Conservative Party	278,477	2.99	0	0	0	New
Liberal Party	271,820	2.92	0	0	0	–2
Righteous Citizens Party	259,960	2.80	0	0	0	New
New Development Party	189,077	2.03	0	0	0	New
Autumn Wind Association	183,938	1.98	0	0	0	New
New People's Association	165,124	1.78	0	0	0	New
Korea Independence Party	128,162	1.38	0	0	0	0
Total	9,298,830	100.00	131	44	175	–58
Valid votes	9,298,830	96.64				
Invalid/blank votes	323,353	3.36				
Total votes	9,622,183	100.00				
Registered voters/turnout	13,344,149	72.11				
Source: Nohlen et al.

=== By city/province ===
Region	Total seats	Seats won				
Region	Total seats	DRP	CR	DP	LDP	PP
Seoul	14	2	7	4	1	0
Busan	7	6	1	0	0	0
Gyeonggi	13	7	5	1	0	0
Gangwon	9	7	0	1	1	0
North Chungcheong	8	6	1	0	1	0
South Chungcheong	13	8	3	0	0	2
North Jeolla	11	7	4	0	0	0
South Jeolla	19	12	3	1	3	0
North Gyeongsang	20	19	1	0	0	0
South Gyeongsang	15	12	2	1	0	0
Jeju	2	2	0	0	0	0
Constituency total	131	88	27	8	6	2
PR list	44	22	14	5	3	0
Total	175	110	41	13	9	2
