= People's Party (South Korea, 1963) =

1963–1964 political party in South Korea

People's Party 국민의당
- Founder: Kim Byeong-ro; Heo Jeong; Lee Beom-seok
- Founded: September 5, 1963
- Dissolved: December 12, 1964
- Merger of: Democratic Party (faction); Liberal Party (faction)
- Preceded by: New Politics Party; People's Friend Party
- Merged into: Democratic Party
- Ideology: Anti-communism

- People's Party
- Hangul: 국민의당
- Hanja: 國民의黨
- RR: Gungminui dang
- MR: Kungminŭi tang

The People's Party (Korean: 국민의당) was a political party in South Korea.

== Electoral results ==
=== President ===
| Election | Candidate | Votes | % | Result |
|---|---|---|---|---|
| 1963 | Heo Jeong | Quit midway through | | |

=== Legislature ===
| Election | Leader | Votes | % | Seats | | | Position | Status |
| Election | Leader | Votes | % | Constituency | Party list | Total | Position | Status |
|---|---|---|---|---|---|---|---|---|
| 1963 | Kim Byeong-ro | 822,000 | 8.84 | 2 / 131 | 0 / 44 | 2 / 175 | 5th | Opposition |
