= Boo Suk-jong =

South Korean admiral (born 1964)

- 부석종
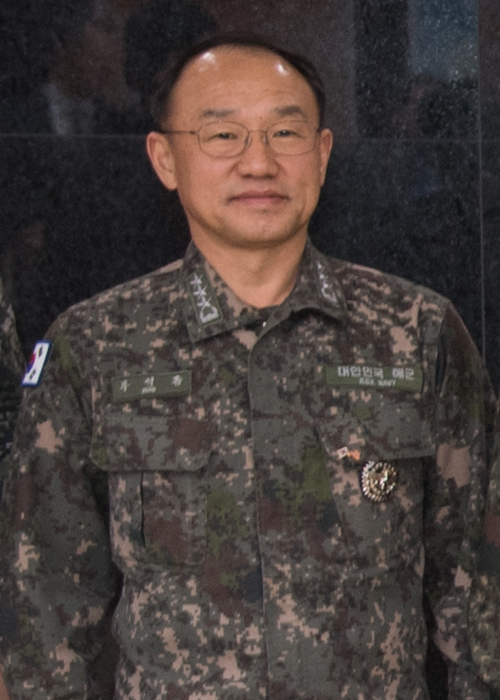
- Admiral Boo Suk-jong

Chief of Naval Operations
- In office 10 April 2020 – 16 December 2021
- President: Moon Jae-in
- Preceded by: Sim Seung-seob
- Succeeded by: Kim Jung-soo

Personal details
- Born: 8 January 1964 (age 62) Jeju, South Korea
- Education: Korea Naval Academy; Kyungnam University

Military service
- Allegiance: South Korea
- Branch/service: Republic of Korea Navy
- Years of service: 1986-2021
- Rank: Admiral
- Commands: Chief of Naval Operations; Joint Staff Military Support Center; Korea Naval Academy; 2nd Fleet; Jeju Naval Base Construction Project Group; 21st Destroyer Task Group; ROKS Wang Geon (DDH-978)

Boo Suk-jong (Korean: 부석종; Hanja: 夫石鍾; born 8 January 1964) is a former South Korean Navy Admiral who served as its Chief of Naval Operations under President Moon Jae-in from 2020 to 2021. He is the first Jeju Island native to lead the Navy.

Before being promoted to the head of Navy in 2020, Boo had served at Joint Chiefs of Staff as head of its Military Support Center from November 2018.

== Military career ==
He graduated from the Korea Naval Academy in March 1985, and mostly served his career within the Republic of Korea Navy. He completed various courses locally and abroad, having completed a master's degree program on Business Administration at Kyungnam University in 2001, and completed staff courses at the Malaysian Armed Forces Command and Staff College in Malaysia from 1998 to 1999, and at the National Defense University at Fort Lesley J. McNair, Washington, D.C. in the United States in 2005.

He was promoted to Sowi in 1986, and was the commanding officer of the ROKS Wang Geon (DDH-978) in December 2009 to June 2010, where he was promoted to Commodore and served as the Commander of the Cheonghae Unit from June 2010 to January 2011, during which he took part in its rescue mission of MV Samho Jewelry hijacked by Somali pirates. He served as the Chief of Staff of the 2nd Fleet in January 2012 to January 2013, and served as the Commander at the 21st Destroyer Task Group from January 2013 to December 2013. He also served as the Commander of the Jeju Naval Base Construction Project Group from December 2013 to November 2015, and also served at the Naval Headquarters at Gyeryong, where he served at the Office of DCNO for both Intelligence & Operations(N2 / N3).

He served as the Commander of the 2nd Fleet from May 2016 to January 2018. He served as the superintendent of his alma mater, Korea Naval Academy from January 2018 to November 2018, and was appointed as the Chief Director of the Joint Staff Military Support Center from November 2018 to April 2020, before being named as the Chief of Naval Operations in April 2020.

== Effective dates of promotion ==
Promotions
Insignia	Rank	Year
	Admiral	2020
	Vice admiral	2018
	Rear admiral Upper Half	2015
	Rear Admiral Lower Half	2014
	Lieutenant commander	1995
	Ensign	1986

== Awards ==
- Order of National Security Merit by the government of South Korea (2011)
