= Song Young-moo =

South Korean admiral (born 1949)

- 송영무
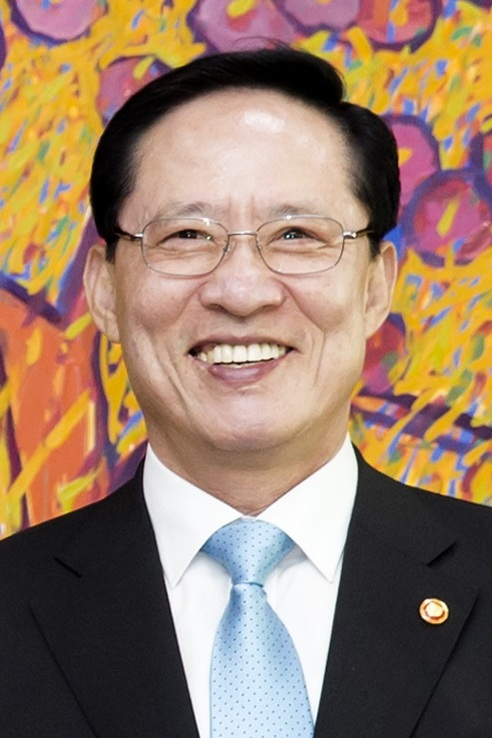
- Song Young-moo in 2017

Minister of National Defense
- In office 14 July 2017 – 21 September 2018
- President: Moon Jae-in
- Preceded by: Han Min-goo
- Succeeded by: Jeong Kyeong-doo

Chief of Naval Operations, Republic of Korea Navy
- In office 2006–2008

Personal details
- Born: 24 February 1949 (age 77) Nonsan, South Korea
- Party: Democratic Party of Korea
- Education: Korea National Defense University; Kyungnam University; Korea Naval Academy

Military service
- Allegiance: South Korea
- Branch/service: Republic of Korea Navy
- Years of service: 1973–2008
- Rank: Admiral
- Battles/wars: First Battle of Yeonpyeong
- Awards: Chungmu Order of Military Merit

Korean name
- Hangul: 송영무
- Hanja: 宋永武
- RR: Song Yeongmu
- MR: Song Yŏngmu

Song Young-moo (Korean: 송영무; born 24 February 1949) is a former South Korean Minister of Defense.

== Career ==
He is a former Republic of Korea Navy admiral who served as the Chief of Naval Operations. Song was previously serving as the Chair Professor of the Military and Police College at Konyang University before President Moon Jae's presidential campaign started in 2017 where he worked as the top security adviser on defense issues.

Military offices
Preceded by Nam Hae-il	Chief of Naval Operations; 2006–2008	Succeeded by Jung Ok-keun
Political offices
Preceded by Han Min-goo	Minister of National Defense; 2017–2018	Succeeded by Jeong Kyeong-doo
