= List of members of the National Assembly (South Korea), 1988–1992 =

The members of the thirteenth National Assembly of South Korea were elected on 26 April 1988. The Assembly sat from 30 May 1988 until 29 May 1992.

== Members ==
Province/City	Constituency	Member	Party	
Province/City	Constituency	Member	At election	At term's end
Seoul	Jongno	Lee Jong-chan	DJP	DLP
Seoul	Jung	Chyung Dai-chul	PDP	Democratic
Seoul	Yongsan	Suh Chung-hwa	DJP	DLP
Seoul	Seongdong A	Kang Kum-sik	PDP	Democratic
Seoul	Seongdong B	Cho Se-hyung	PDP	Democratic
Seoul	Seongdong C	Park Yong-man	RDP	DLP
Seoul	Dongdaemun A	Choi Fun	PDP	Democratic
Seoul	Dongdaemun B	Kim Yung-koo	DJP	DLP
Seoul	Jungnang A	Lee Sang-soo	PDP	Democratic
Seoul	Jungnang B	Kim Duk-kyu	PDP	Democratic
Seoul	Seongbuk A	Lee Chul	Independent	Democratic
Seoul	Seongbuk B	Chough Yoon-hyung	PDP	UNP
Seoul	Dobong A	Shin Oh-chul	NDRP	DLP
Seoul	Dobong B	Lee Chul-yong	PDP	Independent
Seoul	Nowon A	Paek Nam-chi	RDP	DLP
Seoul	Nowon B	Kim Yong-chae	NDRP	DLP
Seoul	Eunpyeong A	O You-bang	DJP	DLP
Seoul	Eunpyeong B	Kim Jae-kwang	RDP	DLP
Seoul	Seodaemun A	Kang Sung-mo	DJP	DLP
Seoul	Seodaemun B	Lim Choon-won	PDP	Independent
Seoul	Mapo A	Noh Sung-hwan	PDP	Independent
Seoul	Mapo B	Kang Sin-ok	RDP	DLP
Seoul	Yangcheon A	Yang Sung-woo	PDP	Democratic
Seoul	Yangcheon B	Kim Yung-bae	PDP	Democratic
Seoul	Gangseo A	Lee Won-bea (Note: Lee Won-bea was removed on 28 February 1992.)	PDP	Independent
Seoul	Gangseo B	Nam Jae-hee	DJP	DLP
Seoul	Guro A	Kim Ki-bae	DJP	DLP
Seoul	Guro B	You Kee-soo	NDRP	DLP
Seoul	Yeongdeungpo A	Chang Suk-hwa	RDP	Democratic
Seoul	Yeongdeungpo B	Kim Myung-sup (Note: Kim Myung-sup was removed on 26 May 1989, after his election was invalidated.)	DJP	DJP
Seoul	Yeongdeungpo B	Rha Woong-bae (Note: Rha Woong-bae was by-elected on 18 August 1989, to succeed Kim Myung-sup.)	DJP	DLP
Seoul	Dongjak A	Suh Chung-won	RDP	DLP
Seoul	Dongjak B	Park Sil	PDP	Democratic
Seoul	Gwanak A	Han Gwang-ok	PDP	Democratic
Seoul	Gwanak B	Lee Hae-chan	PDP	Democratic
Seoul	Seocho A	Park Chan-jong	Independent	NPRP
Seoul	Seocho B	Kim Deog-ryong	RDP	DLP
Seoul	Gangnam A	Hwang Byung-tai	RDP	DLP
Seoul	Gangnam B	Lee Tae-sup (Note: Lee Tae-sup was removed on 28 February 1992.)	DJP	DLP
Seoul	Songpa A	Kim Woo-suk	RDP	DLP
Seoul	Songpa B	Kim Jong-wan	PDP	Democratic
Seoul	Gangdong A	Kim Dong-kyu	RDP	DLP
Seoul	Gangdong B	Kim Zoong-wie	DJP	DLP
Busan	Jung	Kim Kwang-il	RDP	UNP
Busan	Seo	Kim Young-sam	RDP	DLP
Busan	Dong	Roh Moo-hyun	RDP	Democratic
Busan	Yeongdo	Kim Jung-kil	RDP	Democratic
Busan	Busanjin A	Chung Jey-moon	RDP	DLP
Busan	Busanjin B	Kim Jeung-soo	RDP	DLP
Busan	Dongrae A	Park Kwan-yong	RDP	DLP
Busan	Dongrae B	Choi Hyung-woo	RDP	DLP
Busan	Nam A	Hur Jae-hong	RDP	DLP
Busan	Nam B	Chung Sang-koo	RDP	UNP
Busan	Buk A	Moon Jung-soo	RDP	DLP
Busan	Buk B	Shin Sang-woo	RDP	DLP
Busan	Haeundae	Lee Ki-taek	RDP	Democratic
Busan	Saha	Seo Seok-jai	RDP	Independent
Busan	Geumjeong	Kim Jin-jae	DJP	DLP
Daegu	Jung	Yoo Su-ho	DJP	DLP
Daegu	Dong	Park Jyun-kyu	DJP	DLP
Daegu	Seo A	Chung Ho-yong (Note: Chung Ho-yong resigned on 5 January 1990.)	DJP	DJP
Daegu	Seo A	Moon Hi-gab (Note: Moon Hi-gab was by-elected on 3 April 1990, to succeed Chung Ho-yong.)	DLP	DLP
Daegu	Seo B	Choi Woon-ji	DJP	DLP
Daegu	Nam	Lee Jung-moo	DJP	DLP
Daegu	Buk	Kim Yong-tae	DJP	DLP
Daegu	Suseong	Rhee Chi-ho	DJP	DLP
Daegu	Dalseo	Kim Han-kyu	DJP	DLP
Incheon	Jung–Dong	Seo Jung-hwa	DJP	DLP
Incheon	Nam A	Shim Chung-ku	DJP	DLP
Incheon	Nam B	Lee Kang-hee	DJP	DLP
Incheon	Namdong	Kang Woo-hyuk	DJP	DLP
Incheon	Buk A	Chung Jung-hoon	RDP	DLP
Incheon	Buk B	Lee Seung-yun	DJP	DLP
Incheon	Seo	Cho Young-jang	DJP	DLP
Gwangju	Dong	Shin Ki-ha	PDP	Democratic
Gwangju	Seo A	Chung Sang-yong	PDP	Democratic
Gwangju	Seo B	Park Jong-tae	PDP	Independent
Gwangju	Buk	Chung Woong	PDP	NPRP
Gwangju	Gwangsan	Cho Hong-kyu	PDP	Democratic
Gyeonggi Province	Suwon A	Kim In-young	DJP	DLP
Gyeonggi Province	Suwon B	Lee Byoung-heui	NDRP	DLP
Gyeonggi Province	Seongnam A	Lee Dae-yub	NDRP	DLP
Gyeonggi Province	Seongnam B	Lee Chan-koo	PDP	UNP
Gyeonggi Province	Uijeongbu	Kim Moon-won	NDRP	DLP
Gyeonggi Province	Anyang A	Rhee In-je	RDP	DLP
Gyeonggi Province	Anyang B	Sin Ha-chul	RDP	DLP
Gyeonggi Province	Jung, Bucheon	Lim Moo-woong	DJP	DLP
Gyeonggi Province	Nam, Bucheon	Choi Ki-sun	RDP	DLP
Gyeonggi Province	Gwangmyeong	Kim Byong-young	NDRP	DLP
Gyeonggi Province	Songtan–Pyeongtaek City	Kwon Dal-su	DJP	DLP
Gyeonggi Province	Dongducheon–Yangju	Lee Duk-ho	DJP	Independent
Gyeonggi Province	Ansan–Ongjin	Chang Kyung-woo	DJP	DLP
Gyeonggi Province	Gwacheon–Siheung	Hwang Chul-su	DJP	DLP
Gyeonggi Province	Guri	Jun Yong-won	DJP	DLP
Gyeonggi Province	Namyangju	Lee Sung-ho	DJP	DLP
Gyeonggi Province	Yeoju	Jong Dong-song	DJP	DLP
Gyeonggi Province	Pyeongtaek County	Lee Ja-hon	DJP	DLP
Gyeonggi Province	Hwaseong	Park Ji-weon	DJP	Independent
Gyeonggi Province	Paju	Choi Moo-ryong	NDRP	DLP
Gyeonggi Province	Goyang	Lee Taek-seok	NDRP	DLP
Gyeonggi Province	Gwangju	Yoo Ki-jun	RDP	DLP
Gyeonggi Province	Yeoncheon–Pocheon	Lee Han-dong	DJP	DLP
Gyeonggi Province	Gapyeong–Yangpyeong	Kim Young-sun	DJP	Independent
Gyeonggi Province	Icheon	Lee Young-moon	DJP	DLP
Gyeonggi Province	Yongin	Lee Woong-hee	DJP	DLP
Gyeonggi Province	Anseong	Lee Hae-koo	Independent	DLP
Gyeonggi Province	Gimpo–Ganghwa	Jeong Hae-nam	DJP	DLP
Gangwon Province	Chuncheon	Han Seung-soo	DJP	DLP
Gangwon Province	Wonju	Hahm Jong-han	DJP	DLP
Gangwon Province	Gangneung	Choi Gak-kyu	NDRP	DLP
Gangwon Province	Donghae	Hong Hee-pyo (Note: Hong Hee-pyo was removed on 14 March 1989, after his election was invalidated, but returned by being by-elected on 14 April 1989.)	Independent (Note: Hong Hee-pyo was affiliated with the Democratic Justice Party at the time of his removal and by-election.)	DLP
Gangwon Province	Taebaek	Ryu Seung-kyu	Independent	DLP
Gangwon Province	Myeongju–Yangyang	Kim Moon-kee	DJP	DLP
Gangwon Province	Samcheok City–Samcheok County	Kim Il-dong	RDP	DLP
Gangwon Province	Hongcheon	Lee Eung-sun	DJP	DLP
Gangwon Province	Chunseong–Yanggu–Inje	Lee Min-sup	DJP	DLP
Gangwon Province	Hoengseong–Wonseong	Park Kyung-soo	RDP	DLP
Gangwon Province	Yeongwol–Pyeongchang	Shim Myung-boo	DJP	DLP
Gangwon Province	Jeongsan	Park Woo-byong	DJP	DLP
Gangwon Province	Sokcho–Goseong	Choi Joung-sick	RDP	Independent
Gangwon Province	Hwacheon–Cheolwon	Kim Jae-soon	DJP	DLP
North Chungcheong Province	Cheongju A	Chung Chong-teck	DJP	DLP
North Chungcheong Province	Cheongju B	Oh Yong-woon (Note: Oh Yong-woon was removed on 28 February 1992.)	NDRP	DLP
North Chungcheong Province	Chungju–Jungwon	Lee Jong-keun	NDRP	DLP
North Chungcheong Province	Jechon	Lee Choon-koo	DJP	DLP
North Chungcheong Province	Cheongwon	Shin Kyung-shik	DJP	DLP
North Chungcheong Province	Boeun–Okcheon–Yeongdong	Park Jun-byung	DJP	DLP
North Chungcheong Province	Gwisan	Kim Chong-hoh	DJP	DLP
North Chungcheong Province	Jincheon–Eumseong	Kim Wan-tae (Note: Kim Wan-tae died on 13 January 1990.)	DJP	DJP
North Chungcheong Province	Jincheon–Eumseong	Heo Tak (Note: Heo Tak was by-elected on 3 April 1990, to succeed Kim Wan-tae.)	Independent	Democratic
North Chungcheong Province	Jewon–Danyang	Ahn Yooung-ki	DJP	DLP
South Chungcheong Province	Dong A, Daejeon	Kim Hyun	NDRP	Democratic
South Chungcheong Province	Dong B, Daejeon	Yun Sung-han	NDRP	DLP
South Chungcheong Province	Jung, Daejeon	Kim Hong-man	NDRP	DLP
South Chungcheong Province	Seo, Daejeon	Park Chung-soon	NDRP	DLP
South Chungcheong Province	Cheonan	Jeong Ill-young	NDRP	DLP
South Chungcheong Province	Gongju City–Gongju County	Yoon Jai-ki	NDRP	DLP
South Chungcheong Province	Daecheon–Boryeong	Kim Yong-hwan	NDRP	DLP
South Chungcheong Province	Eunyang–Asan	Hwang Myung-soo	RDP	DLP
South Chungcheong Province	Geumsan	Yoo Han-yul	Independent	DLP
South Chungcheong Province	Daedeok–Yeongi	Lee In-koo	NDRP	DLP
South Chungcheong Province	Nonsan	Kim Je-tai	NDRP	DLP
South Chungcheong Province	Buyeo	Kim Jong-pil	NDRP	DLP
South Chungcheong Province	Seocheon	Lee Keung-kyu	DJP	DLP
South Chungcheong Province	Cheongyang–Hongseong	Cho Boo-young	NDRP	DLP
South Chungcheong Province	Yesan	Park Byung-sun	NDRP	UNP
South Chungcheong Province	Seosan	Park Tae-kwon	RDP	DLP
South Chungcheong Province	Dangjin	Kim Hyun-uk	DJP	DLP
South Chungcheong Province	Cheonwon	Kim Jong-shik	NDRP	Independent
North Jeolla Province	Jeonju A	Oh Tan	PDP	Democratic
North Jeolla Province	Jeonju B	Son Ju-hang	PDP	Independent
North Jeolla Province	Gunsan	Chae Young-suk	PDP	Democratic
North Jeolla Province	Iri	Lee Hyup	PDP	Democratic
North Jeolla Province	Jeongju–Jeongeup	Kim Won-ki	PDP	Democratic
North Jeolla Province	Namwon City–Namwon County	Cho Chan-hyoung	PDP	Democratic
North Jeolla Province	Wanju	Kim Tai-shik	PDP	Democratic
North Jeolla Province	Jinan–Muju–Jangsu	Lee Sang-ok	PDP	UNP
North Jeolla Province	Imsil–Sunchang	Hong Young-kee	PDP	Democratic
North Jeolla Province	Gochang	Chung Kyun-hwan	PDP	Democratic
North Jeolla Province	Buan	Lee Hee-chun	PDP	Democratic
North Jeolla Province	Gimje	Choi Rak-do	PDP	Democratic
North Jeolla Province	Okgu	Kim Bong-wook	PDP	NPRP
North Jeolla Province	Iksan	Kim Deuk-soo	PDP	NPRP
South Jeolla Province	Mokpo	Kwon Roh-kap	PDP	Democratic
South Jeolla Province	Yeosu	Kim Choong-joh	PDP	Democratic
South Jeolla Province	Suncheon	Huh Kyung-man	PDP	Democratic
South Jeolla Province	Naju City–Naju County	Lee Jai-keun	PDP	Democratic
South Jeolla Province	Yeocheon City–Yeocheon County	Shin Soon-beom	PDP	Democratic
South Jeolla Province	Damyang–Jangseong	Kim Kill-kon	PDP	UNP
South Jeolla Province	Gokseong–Hwasun	Hong Ki-hoon	PDP	Democratic
South Jeolla Province	Gurye–Seungju	Cho Soon-sung	PDP	Democratic
South Jeolla Province	Gwangyang	Lee Don-man	PDP	UNP
South Jeolla Province	Goheung	Park Sang-cheon	PDP	Democratic
South Jeolla Province	Boseong	Yoo Joon-sang	PDP	Democratic
South Jeolla Province	Jangheung	Lee Young-kwon	PDP	Democratic
South Jeolla Province	Gangjin–Wando	Kim Young-jin	PDP	Democratic
South Jeolla Province	Haenam–Jindo	Kim Bong-ho	PDP	Democratic
South Jeolla Province	Yeongam	Yoo In-hak	PDP	Democratic
South Jeolla Province	Muan	Park Seok-moo	PDP	Democratic
South Jeolla Province	Hampyeong–Yeonggwang	Suh Kyong-won (Note: Suh Kyong-won was removed on 24 August 1990.)	PDP	PDP
South Jeolla Province	Hampyeong–Yeonggwang	Lee Soo-in (Note: Lee Soo-in was by-elected on 9 November 1990, to succeed Suh Kyong-won.)	PDP	Democratic
South Jeolla Province	Sinan	Park Hyung-oh	HDP	Independent
North Gyeongsang Province	Pohang	Lee Jin-u	DJP	DLP
North Gyeongsang Province	Gyeongju	Kim Il-yun	DJP	DLP
North Gyeongsang Province	Gimcheon–Geumneung	Park Jeong-su	DJP	DLP
North Gyeongsang Province	Andong City	O Kyeong-ui	RDP	DLP
North Gyeongsang Province	Gumi	Park Jae-hong	DJP	DLP
North Gyeongsang Province	Yeongju–Yeongpung	Kim Jin-yeong	DJP	DLP
North Gyeongsang Province	Yeongcheon City–Yeongcheon County	Jeong Dong-yun	DJP	DLP
North Gyeongsang Province	Sangju City–Sangju County	Kim Keun-su	DJP	DLP
North Gyeongsang Province	Jeomchon–Mungyeong	Shin Yeong-guk	RDP	DLP
North Gyeongsang Province	Dalseong–Goryeong	Ku Ja-chun	NDRP	DLP
North Gyeongsang Province	Gunwi–Seonsan	Kim Yun-hwan	DJP	DLP
North Gyeongsang Province	Uiseong	Jeong Chang-hwa	DJP	Independent
North Gyeongsang Province	Andong County	Ryu Don-u	DJP	DLP
North Gyeongsang Province	Cheongsong–Yeongdok	Hwang Byeong-u	DJP	DLP
North Gyeongsang Province	Yangyang–Bonghwa	O Han-gu	DJP	Independent
North Gyeongsang Province	Yeongil–Ulleung	Lee Sang-deuk	DJP	DLP
North Gyeongsang Province	Wolseong	Hwang Yun-gi	DJP	DLP
North Gyeongsang Province	Gyeongsan–Cheongdo	Lee Jae-yeon	NDRP	Independent
North Gyeongsang Province	Seongju–Chilgok	Jang Yeong-cheol	DJP	DLP
North Gyeongsang Province	Yecheon	Yu Hak-seong	DJP	DLP
North Gyeongsang Province	Uljin	Kim Jung-gwon	DJP	DLP
South Gyeongsang Province	Changwon	Hwang Nak-ju	RDP	DLP
South Gyeongsang Province	Jung, Ulsan	Kim Tae-ho	DJP	DLP
South Gyeongsang Province	Nam, Ulsan	Shim Wan-gu	RDP	DLP
South Gyeongsang Province	Dong, Ulsan	Chung Mong-joon	Independent	UNP
South Gyeongsang Province	Masan A	Baek Chan-gi	RDP	DLP
South Gyeongsang Province	Masan B	Kang Sam-jae	RDP	DLP
South Gyeongsang Province	Jinju	Jo Man-hu	RDP	DLP
South Gyeongsang Province	Jinhae–Uichang	Park Jae-gyu (Note: Park Jae-gyu was removed on 10 March 1992.)	RDP	DLP
South Gyeongsang Province	Chungmu–Tongyeong–Goseong	Jeong Sun-deok	DJP	DLP
South Gyeongsang Province	Samcheonpo–Sacheon	Hwang Seong-gyun	DJP	Independent
South Gyeongsang Province	Gimhae City–Gimhae County	Lee Hak-bong (Note: Lee Hak-bong was removed on 10 March 1992.)	DJP	Independent
South Gyeongsang Province	Jinyang	An Byeong-gyu	DJP	DLP
South Gyeongsang Province	Uiryeong–Haman	Jeong Dong-ho	DJP	DLP
South Gyeongsang Province	Changnyeong	Shin Jae-gi	DJP	DLP
South Gyeongsang Province	Milyang	Shin Sang-sik	DJP	DLP
South Gyeongsang Province	Yangsan	Kim Dong-ju (Note: Kim Dong-ju resigned on 26 February 1992.)	RDP	Independent
South Gyeongsang Province	Ulju	Park Jin-gu	DJP	UNP
South Gyeongsang Province	Geoje	Kim Bong-jo	RDP	DLP
South Gyeongsang Province	Namhae–Hadong	Park Hui-tae	DJP	DLP
South Gyeongsang Province	Sancheong–Hamyang	No In-hwan	DJP	DLP
South Gyeongsang Province	Gochang	Kim Dong-yeong (Note: Kim Dong-yeong died on 19 August 1991.)	RDP	DLP
South Gyeongsang Province	Hapcheon	Kwon Hae-ok	DJP	DLP
Jeju Province	Jeju City	Ko Se-jin	Independent	DLP
Jeju Province	Bukjeju	Lee Ki-bin	Independent	DLP
Jeju Province	Seogwipo–Namjeju	Kang Bo-seong	RDP	DLP
National	Proportional representation	Chae Mun-sik	DJP	DLP
National	Proportional representation	Yun Kil-jung	DJP	DLP
National	Proportional representation	Jeong Seok-mo	DJP	DLP
National	Proportional representation	Kang Young-hoon (Note: Kang Young-hoon resigned on 19 December 1988, upon being appointed as Prime Minister of South Korea.)	DJP	DJP
National	Proportional representation	Lee Byeong-yong	DJP	DLP
National	Proportional representation	Park Tae-joon	DJP	DLP
National	Proportional representation	Kim Dong-in	DJP	DLP
National	Proportional representation	Lee Kwang-no	DJP	DLP
National	Proportional representation	Lee Yun-ja	DJP	DLP
National	Proportional representation	Lee Won-jo	DJP	DLP
National	Proportional representation	Kim Chong-kon	DJP	DLP
National	Proportional representation	Kim In-gi	DJP	DLP
National	Proportional representation	Lee Dong-jin	DJP	DLP
National	Proportional representation	Lee Do-seon	DJP	DLP
National	Proportional representation	Kim Jong-gi	DJP	DLP
National	Proportional representation	Ji Yeon-tae	DJP	DLP
National	Proportional representation	Park Cheol-eon	DJP	DLP
National	Proportional representation	Jo Kyeong-mok	DJP	DLP
National	Proportional representation	Choi Chang-yun (Note: Choi Chang-yun resigned on 19 December 1988, upon being appointed as Senior Presidential Secretary for Political Affairs.)	DJP	DJP
National	Proportional representation	Choi Jae-uk	DJP	DLP
National	Proportional representation	Yu Ki-cheon	DJP	DLP
National	Proportional representation	Na Chang-ju	DJP	DLP
National	Proportional representation	Seo Sang-mok	DJP	DLP
National	Proportional representation	Park Seung-jae	DJP	DLP
National	Proportional representation	Son Ju-hwan (Note: Son Ju-hwan resigned on 28 December 1990, upon being appointed as Senior Presidential Secretary for Political Affairs.)	DJP	DLP
National	Proportional representation	Lee Sang-ha	DJP	DLP
National	Proportional representation	Kim Jang-suk	DJP	DLP
National	Proportional representation	Yang Kyeong-ja	DJP	DLP
National	Proportional representation	Lee Sang-hui	DJP	DLP
National	Proportional representation	Hong Se-gi	DJP	DLP
National	Proportional representation	Kim Kil-hong	DJP	DLP
National	Proportional representation	Kang Jae-sup	DJP	DLP
National	Proportional representation	Kim Jeong-gil	DJP	Independent
National	Proportional representation	Jo Nam-ok	DJP	DLP
National	Proportional representation	Lee Chae-hwang	DJP	DLP
National	Proportional representation	Lim In-gyu	DJP	DLP
National	Proportional representation	Shin Yeong-sun	DJP	DLP
National	Proportional representation	Do Yeong-sim	DJP	DLP
National	Proportional representation	Shim Ki-seop (Note: Shim Ki-seop took office on 19 December 1988, to succeed Kang Young-hoon.)	DJP	Independent
National	Proportional representation	An Chan-hui (Note: An Chan-hui took office on 19 December 1988, to succeed Choi Chang-yun.)	DJP	DLP
National	Proportional representation	Choi Sang-jin (Note: Choi Sang-jin took office on 28 December 1990, to succeed Son Ju-hwan.)	DLP (Note: Included in the Democratic Justice Party list in the 1988 election.)	DLP
National	Proportional representation	Park Yeong-suk	PDP	Democratic
National	Proportional representation	Song Hyeon-seop	PDP	NPRP
National	Proportional representation	Lee Dong-geun	PDP	Democratic
National	Proportional representation	Choi Bong-gu	PDP	Democratic
National	Proportional representation	Kim Yeong-do	PDP	Democratic
National	Proportional representation	Lee Kyeong-jae	PDP	Democratic
National	Proportional representation	Kim Ju-ho	PDP	Democratic
National	Proportional representation	Lee Kyo-seong	PDP	Democratic
National	Proportional representation	Lee Hyeong-bae	PDP	Independent
National	Proportional representation	Heo Man-gi	PDP	Democratic
National	Proportional representation	Kim Dae-jung	PDP	Democratic
National	Proportional representation	Mun Dong-hwan	PDP	Democratic
National	Proportional representation	Choi Yeong-geun	PDP	Democratic
National	Proportional representation	Jo Seung-hyeong	PDP	Democratic
National	Proportional representation	Jeong Ki-yeong	PDP	Democratic
National	Proportional representation	Jo Hui-cheol	PDP	Independent
National	Proportional representation	Song Du-ho	RDP	DLP
National	Proportional representation	Lee Haeng-gu	RDP	DLP
National	Proportional representation	No Heung-jun	RDP	DLP
National	Proportional representation	Yu Seung-beon	RDP	DLP
National	Proportional representation	Hwang Dae-bong	RDP	DLP
National	Proportional representation	Mun Jun-sik	RDP	DLP
National	Proportional representation	Seok Jun-gyu	RDP	DLP
National	Proportional representation	Kwon Heon-seong	RDP	Independent
National	Proportional representation	Choi I-ho	RDP	Independent
National	Proportional representation	Park Jong-yul	RDP	DLP
National	Proportional representation	Kim Un-hwan	RDP	DLP
National	Proportional representation	Kim Sung-yong	RDP	DLP
National	Proportional representation	Kim Nam	RDP	DLP
National	Proportional representation	Kim In-gon	NDRP	Democratic
National	Proportional representation	Jeong Si-bong	NDRP	DLP
National	Proportional representation	Yeon Je-won	NDRP	Independent
National	Proportional representation	Lee Hui-il (Note: Lee Hui-il resigned on 21 March 1990, upon being appointed as Minister of Energy.)	NDRP	DLP
National	Proportional representation	Kim Du-yun	NDRP	DLP
National	Proportional representation	Shin Jin-su	NDRP	DLP
National	Proportional representation	Ok Man-ho	NDRP	DLP
National	Proportional representation	Shin Cheol-gyun	NDRP	DLP
National	Proportional representation	Kwon O-seok (Note: Kwon O-seok took office on 21 March 1990, to succeed Lee Hui-il.)	DLP (Note: Included in the New Democratic Republican Party list in the 1988 election.)	DLP
