= Yang Yong-mo =

South Korean admiral (born 1967)

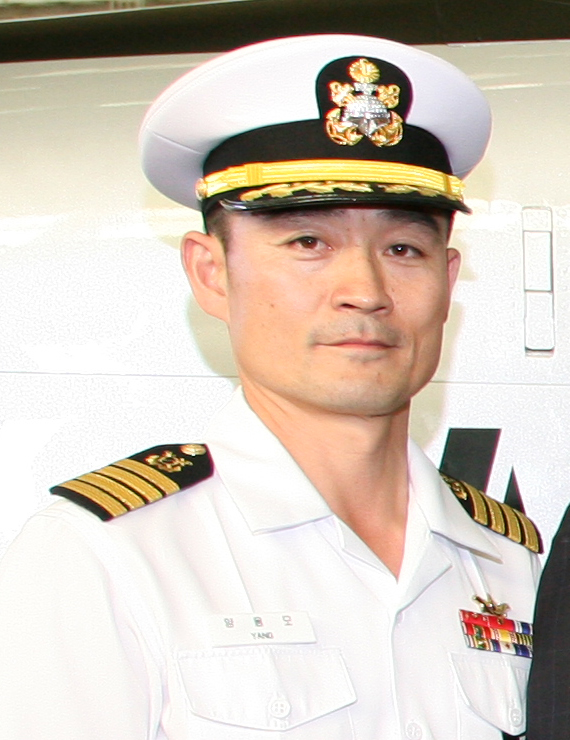

Chief of Naval Operations
- Incumbent
- Assumed office 31 October 2023
- President: Yoon Suk Yeol; Han Duck-soo (acting); Lee Jae Myung
- Preceded by: Lee Jong-ho
- Succeeded by: Kang Dong-gil

Personal details
- Born: 1967 (age 58–59) Sindae-ri, Hoein-myeon, Boeun County, North Chungcheong Province, South Korea
- Education: Korea Naval Academy

Military service
- Allegiance: South Korea
- Branch/service: Republic of Korea Navy
- Years of service: 1990-2025
- Rank: Admiral
- Commands: Chief of Naval Operations
- Battles/wars: Korean Conflict

Yang Yong-mo (Korean: 양용모; born 1967), is a South Korean Navy admiral who has been serving as Chief of Naval Operations since 2022.

== Early life and education ==
Yang was born in 1967 in Sindae-ri, Hoein-myeon, Boeun County, North Chungcheong Province. He entered the Korea Naval Academy in 1986 and graduated at the academy in 1990.

== Military career ==
In 1990, Yang was commissioned as a second lieutenant. As a captain, he served as a military attaché in the Korean Consulate in Hawaii. As a rear admiral (Lower Half), he served as the commander of the Second Fleet's Maritime Battle Group Two. In October 2023, he was appointed by President Yoon Suk Yeol as the Chief of Naval Operations, replacing Lee Jong-ho. He was also promoted to admiral from vice admiral.

Military offices
Preceded by Lee Jong-ho	Chief of Naval Operations; 2023–2025	Incumbent
