= ROKS Chungmugong I =

History

South Korea
- Name: ROKS Chungmugong I (PG-313)
- Launched: February 1946
- Commissioned: 7 February 1947
- Decommissioned: March 1956

General characteristics
- Class & type: Patrol boat
- Displacement: 287 tons
- Length: 46.63 m (153.0 ft)
- Beam: 6.7 m (22 ft)
- Speed: 13 knots (24 km/h)
- Complement: 37 officers

ROKS Chungmugong I (PG-313) (Korean: 충무공함) was a patrol boat in the Republic of Korea Navy between the 1940s to 1950s.

Chungmugong I was an incomplete rescue ship of Imperial Japanese Navy. After Japanese Empire was defeated, Admiral Son Won-il reinforced Jinhae shipyard. Chungmugong I was the first ship made by Jinhae shipyard, on 7 February 1947.
