= Lee Jong-ho (admiral) =

- 이종호

Chief of Naval Operations
- President: Yoon Suk Yeol
- Succeeded by: Yang Yong-mo

Personal details
- Born: 1965 (age 60–61) Jeonju City, North Jeolla Province, South Korea
- Education: Korea Naval Academy

Military service
- Allegiance: South Korea
- Branch/service: Republic of Korea Navy
- Rank: Admiral
- Commands: Chief of Naval Operations
- Battles/wars: Korean Conflict

Lee Jong-ho is the incumbent Chief of Naval Operations for the Republic of Korea Navy. Prior to that, he was chief Director of Military Support. He also served as Commander, Republic of Korea Fleet. He was commissioned from Korea Naval Academy in March 1988. On May 25, 2022, Lee was named the new chief of naval operations of South Korea by Yoon Suk Yeol administration.

Military offices
Preceded by Kim Jung Soo	Chief of Naval Operations; 2022–2023	Incumbent
