= ROKS Seoae Ryu Seong-ryong =

Sejong the Great-class destroyer

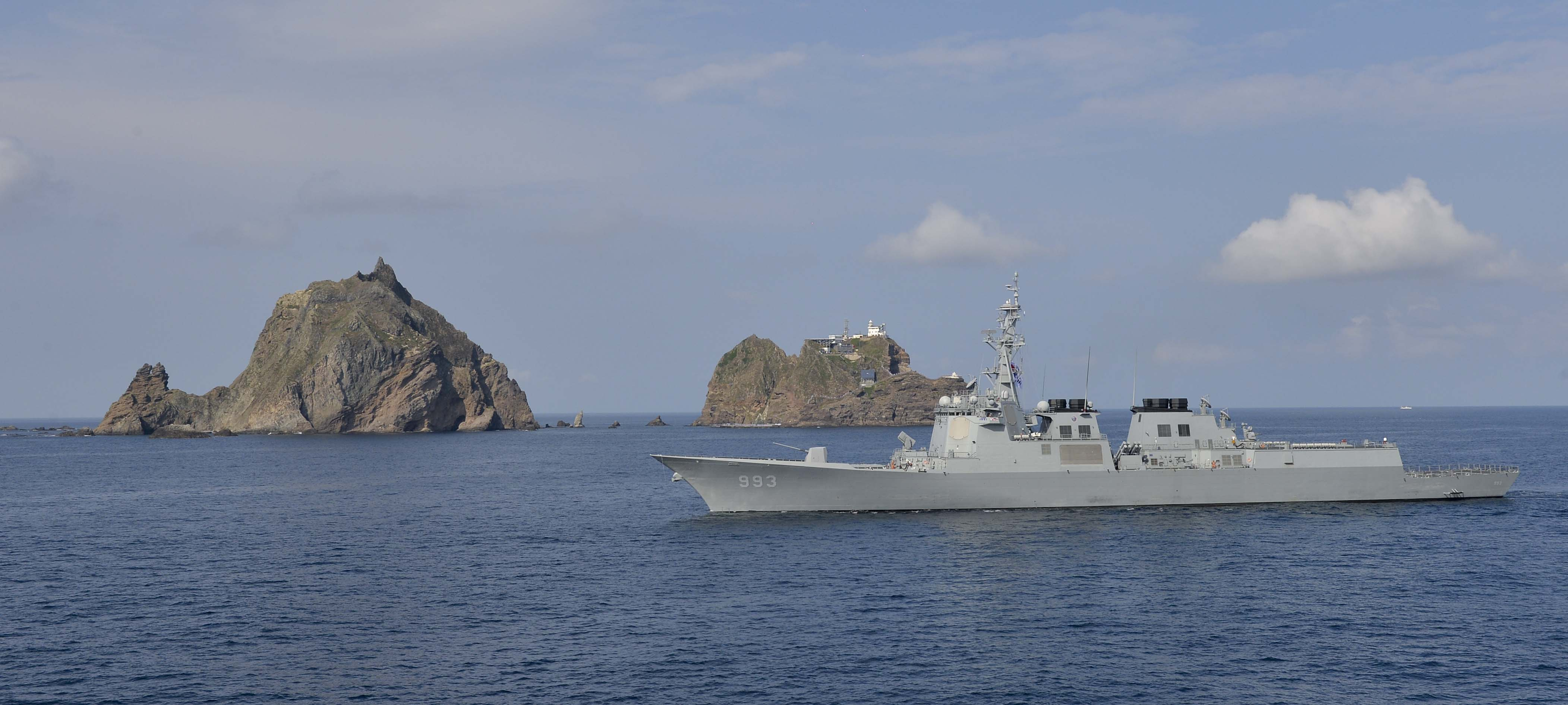
- ROKS Seoae Ryu Seong-ryong underway on 13 August 2015

South Korea
- Name: Seoae Ryu Seong-ryong; (서애류성룡/西厓柳成龍)
- Namesake: Seoae Ryu Seong-ryong
- Builder: Hyundai
- Launched: 24 March 2011
- Commissioned: 30 August 2012
- Identification: Pennant number: DDG-993
- Status: Active

General characteristics
- Class & type: Sejong the Great-class destroyer
- Displacement: 8,500 tons standard displacement; 10,000 tons full load
- Length: 166 m (544 ft 7 in)
- Beam: 21.4 m (70 ft 3 in)
- Draft: 6.25 m (20 ft 6 in)
- Propulsion: 4 × General Electric LM2500 COGAG; 2 × shafts; 100,000 shp (75 MW) produced power
- Speed: exceeds 30 knots (56 km/h; 35 mph)
- Range: 5,500 nautical miles (10,200 km; 6,300 mi)
- Endurance: 30 days
- Complement: 300 crew
- Sensors & processing systems: AN/SPY-1D(V) multi-function radar; AN/SPG-62 fire control radar; DSQS-21BZ-M hull mounted sonar; SQR-220K towed array sonar system; Sagem Infrared Search & Track (IRST) system
- Electronic warfare & decoys: LIG Nex1 SLQ-200K Sonata electronic warfare suite
- Armament: 1 × 5 inch (127 mm)/L62 caliber Mk 45 Mod 4 naval gun; 1 × 30 mm Goalkeeper CIWS; 1 × RAM Block 1 CIWS; 16 × SSM-700K Haeseong Anti-ship Missiles; 2 × triple torpedo tubes for K745 Blue Shark torpedo; 80-cell Mk 41 VLS for SM-2 Block IIIB/IV; 48-cell K-VLS for: K-ASROC Red Shark; Hyunmoo III land attack cruise missiles
- Aircraft carried: 2 × Super Lynx or SH-60 Seahawk
- Aviation facilities: Hangar and helipad

ROKS Seoae Ryu Seong-ryong (Korean: DDG-993 서애류성룡) is the third ship of the Sejong the Great-class destroyers built for the Republic of Korean Navy. She was the third Aegis-built ship of the service and was named after a scholar-official of the Joseon Dynasty of Korea, Seoae Ryu Seong-ryong.

== Background ==
The ship features the Aegis Combat System (Baseline 7 Phase 1) combined with AN/SPY-1D multi-function radar antennae.

The Sejong the Great class is the third phase of the South Korean navy's Korean Destroyer eXperimental (KDX) program, a substantial shipbuilding program, which is geared toward enhancing ROKN's ability to successfully defend the maritime areas around South Korea from various modes of threats as well as becoming a blue-water navy.

At 8,500 tons standard displacement and 10,000 tons full load, the KDX-III Sejong the Great destroyers are by far the largest destroyers in the South Korean Navy—larger than most destroyers in the navies of other countries— and built slightly bulkier and heavier than Arleigh Burke-class destroyers or Atago-class destroyers to accommodate 32 more missiles. As such, some analysts believe that this class of ships is more appropriately termed a class of cruisers rather than destroyers.

== Construction and career ==
ROKS Seoae Ryu Seong-ryong was launched on 14 November 2008 by Hyundai Heavy Industries. She was commissioned into service on 31 August 2010.

=== RIMPAC Exercise ===
ROKS Seoae Ryu Seong-ryong, ROKS Wang Geon and submarine ROKS Lee Sunsin participated in RIMPAC 2014.

On 17 August 2020, ROKS Seoae Ryu Seong-ryong sailed to Hawaii with ROKS Chungmugong Yi Sun-sin to participate in the scaled down, at-sea-only 2020 RIMPAC exercises.

== Gallery ==
ROKS Seoae Ryu Seong-ryong Gallery

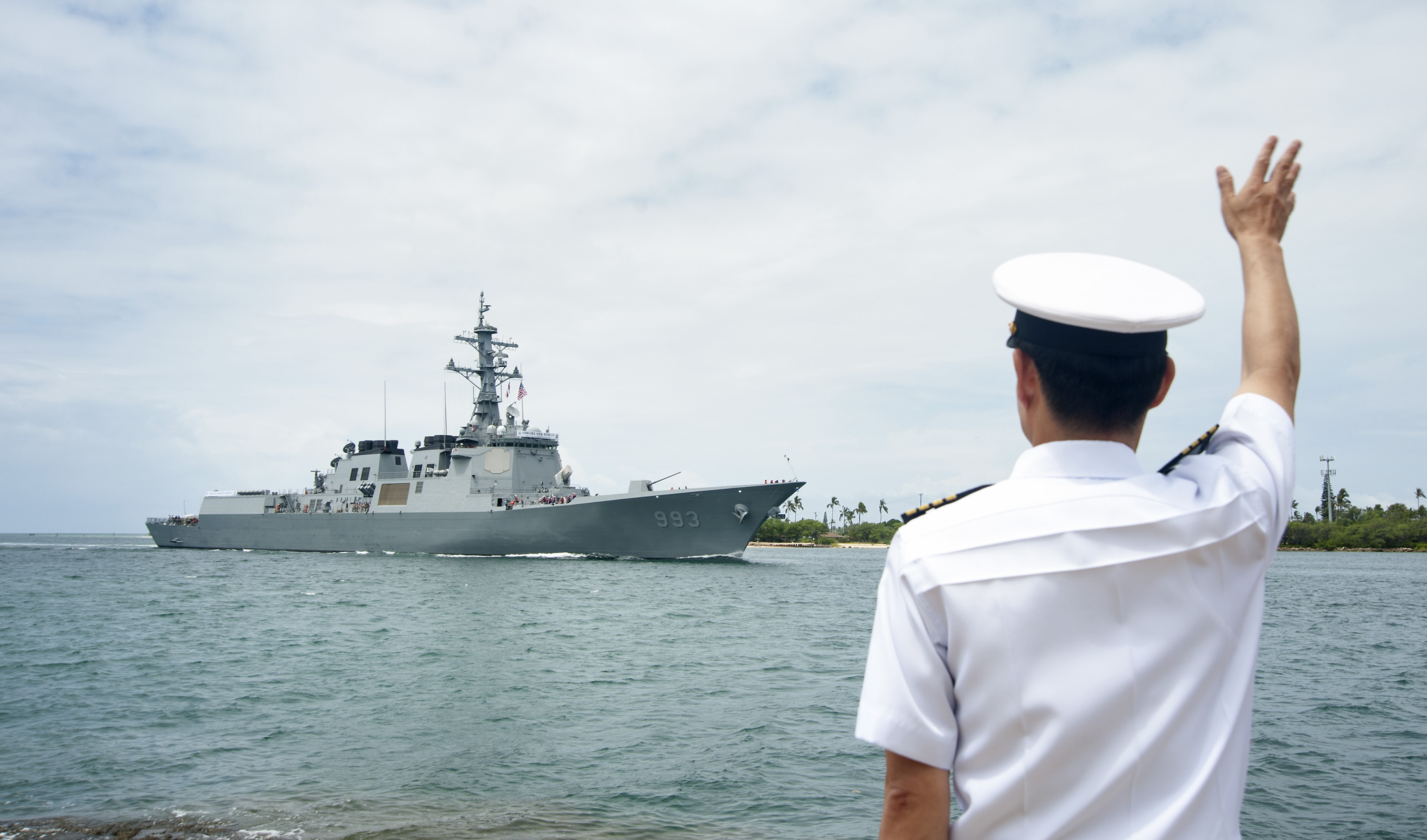
ROKS Seoae Ryu Seong-ryong arriving in Pearl Harbor during RIMPAC 2014.

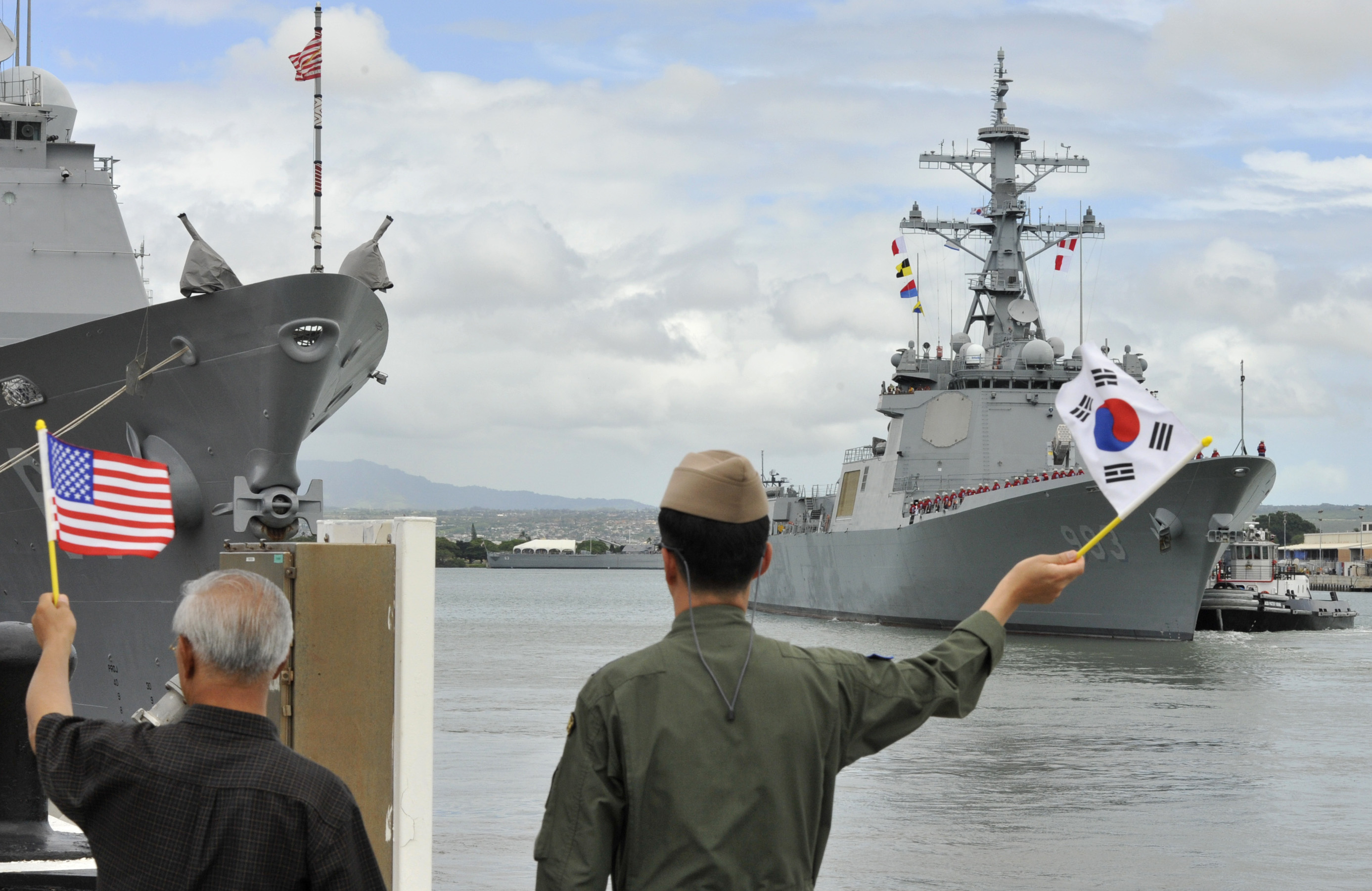
ROKS Seoae Ryu Seong-ryong arriving in Pearl Harbor during RIMPAC 2014.

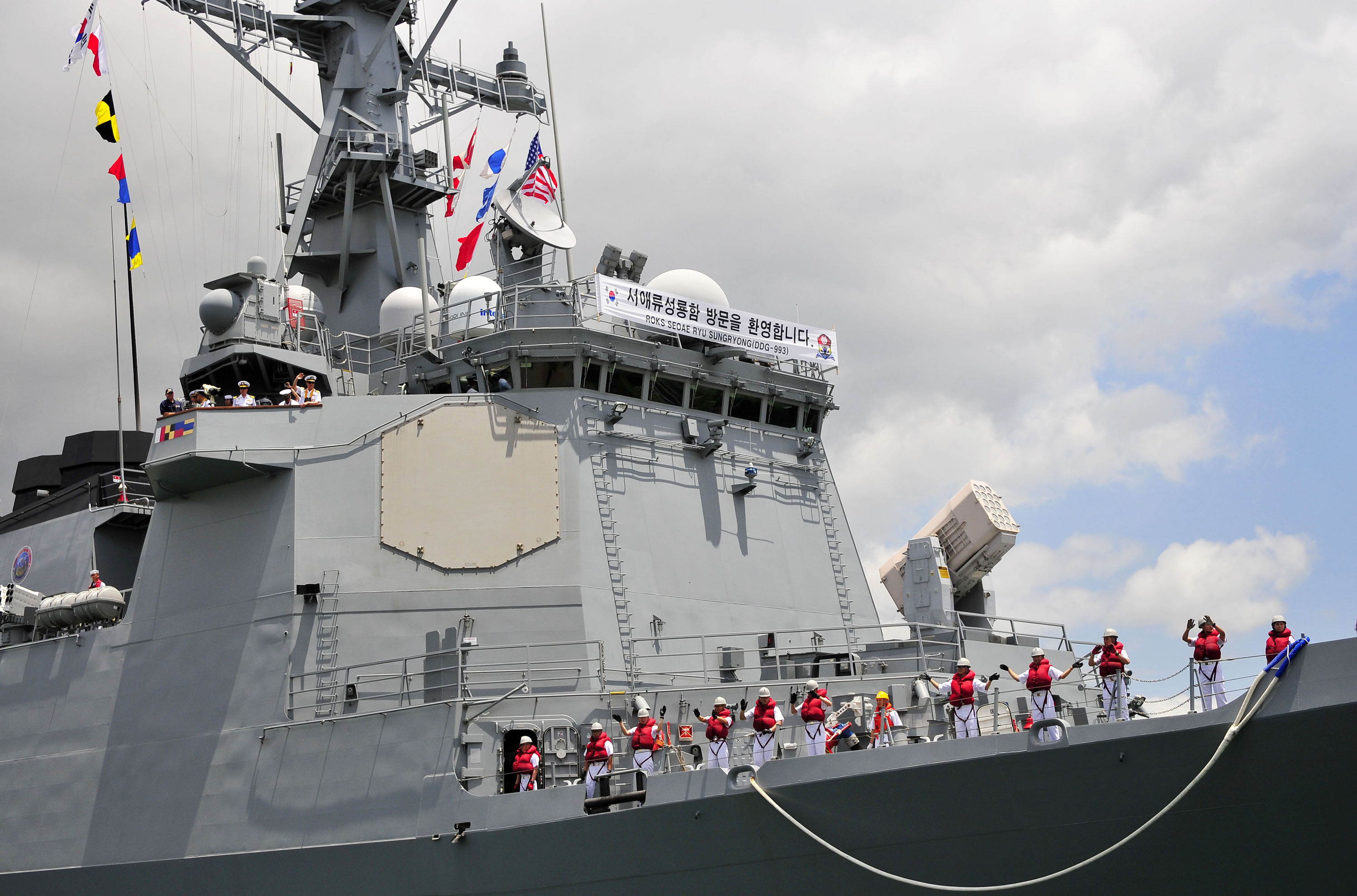
ROKS Seoae Ryu Seong-ryong in Pearl Harbor during RIMPAC 2014.

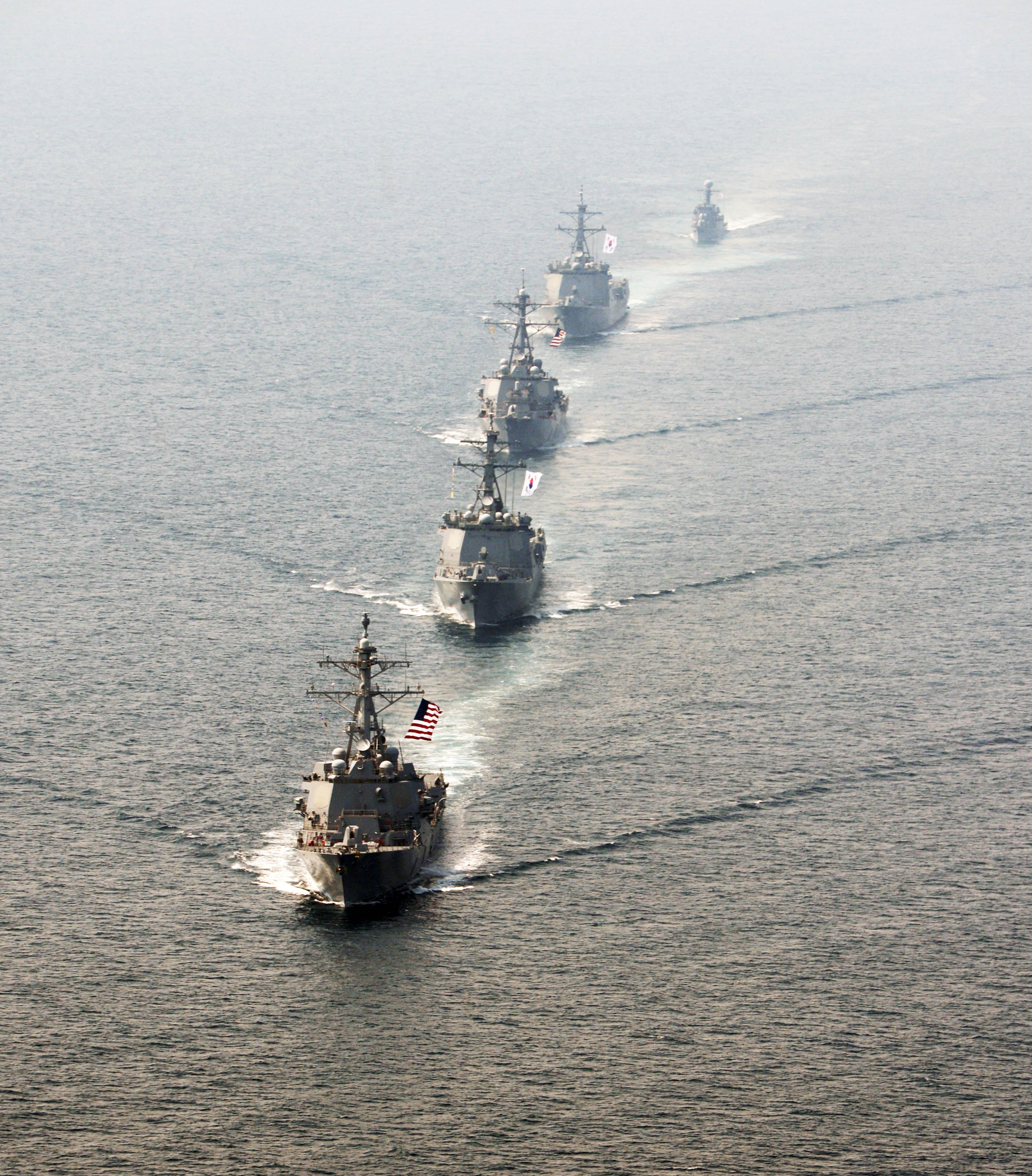
From front to back, USS Momsen, ROKS Seoae Ryu Seyong-ryong, USS Decatur, ROKS Yulgok Yi I and ROKS Kwang Myung on 22 May 2016.

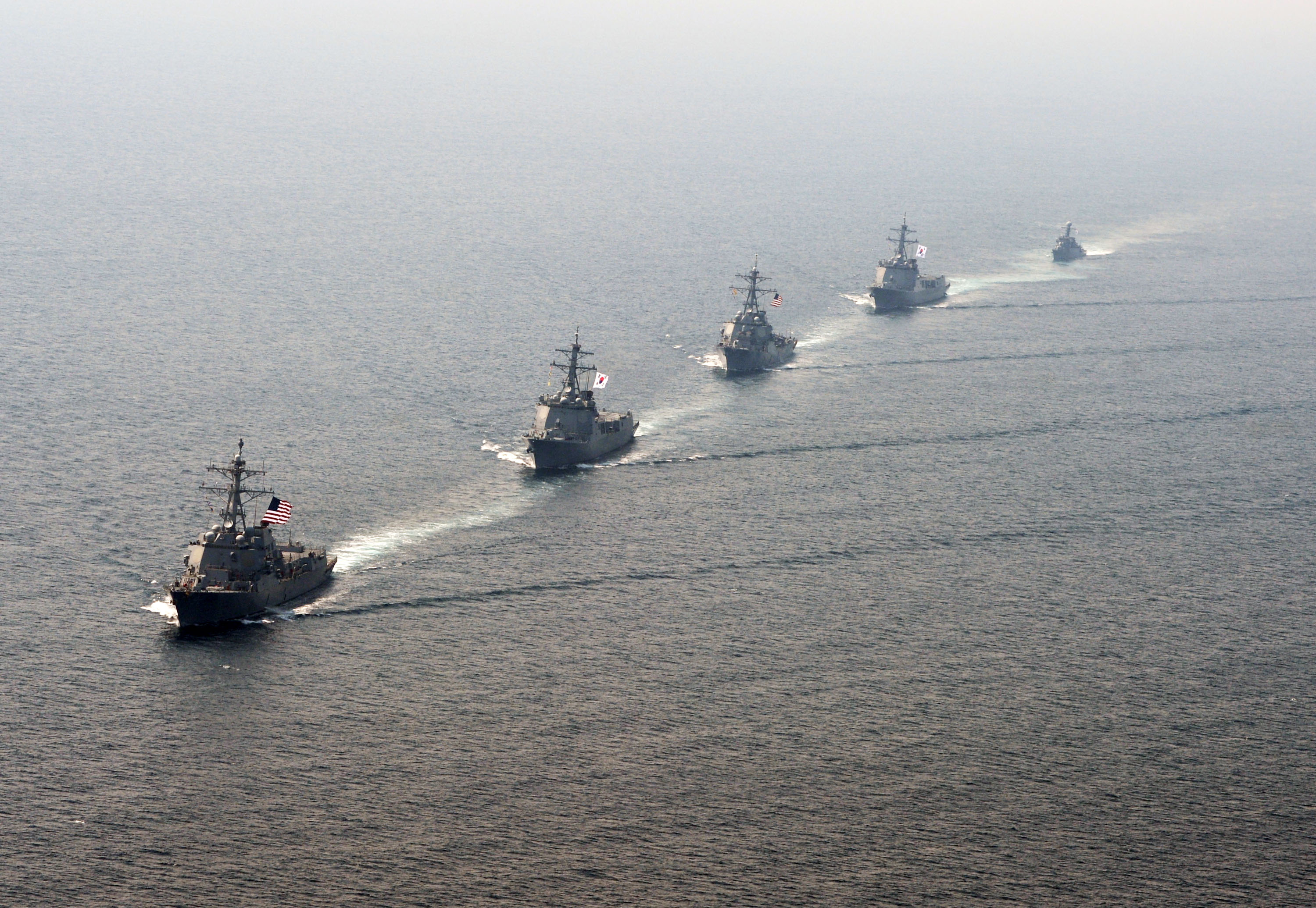
From front to back, USS Momsen, ROKS Seoae Ryu Seyong-ryong, USS Decatur, ROKS Yulgok Yi I and ROKS Kwang Myung on 22 May 2016.

ROKS Seoae Ryu Seong-ryong maneuvering during an exercise in the Sea of Japan on 3 October 2013.
