= ROKS Chungmugong Yi Sun-sin =

Chungmugong Yi Sun-sin-class destroyer

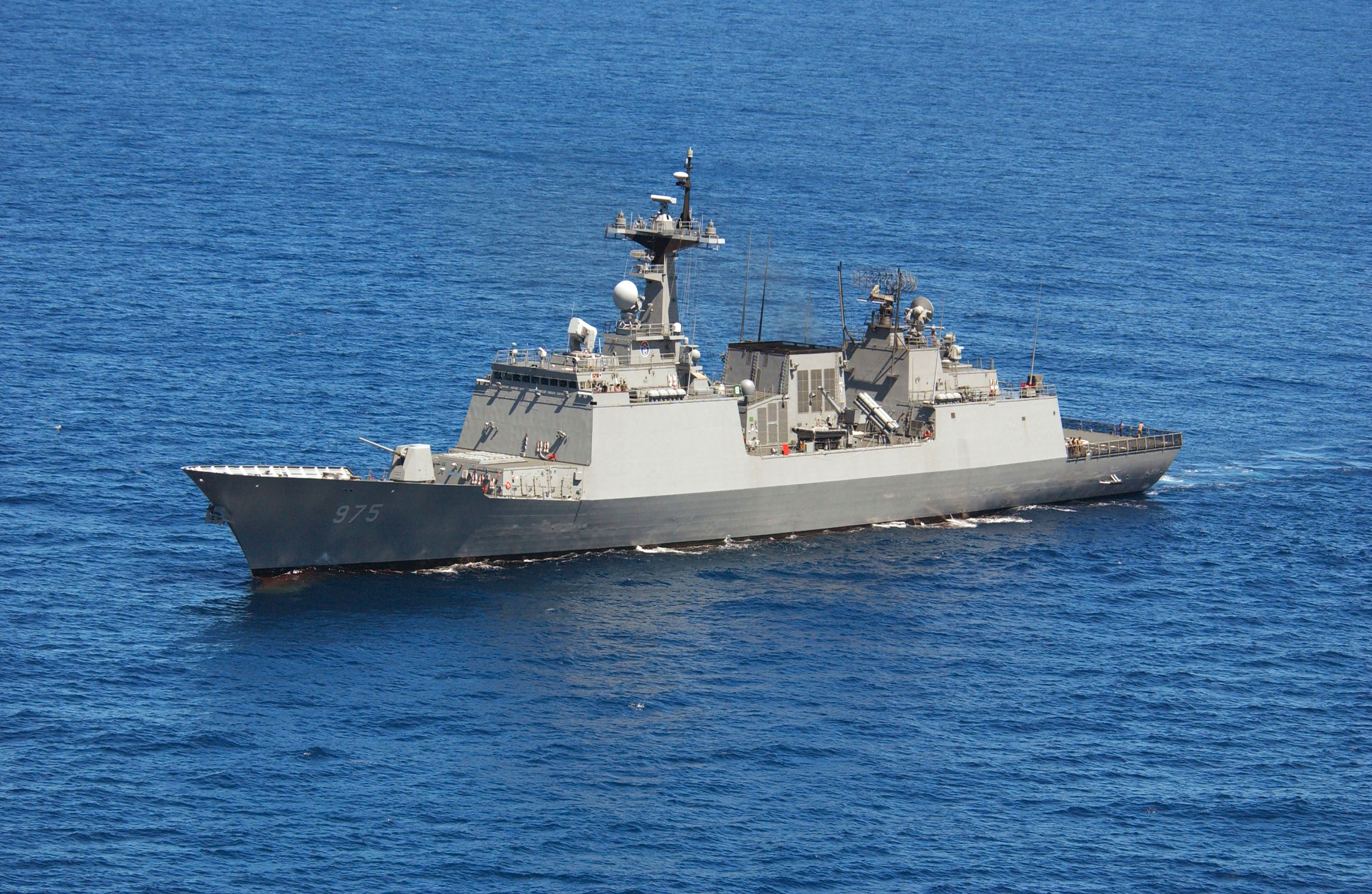
- ROKS Chungmugong Yi Sun-sin on 6 July 2004.

History

South Korea
- Name: Chungmugong Yi Sun-shin; (충무공 이순신)
- Namesake: Yi Sun-sin
- Builder: DSME
- Launched: 22 May 2002
- Commissioned: 2 December 2003
- Identification: IMO number: 4585814; Pennant number: DDH-975
- Status: Active

General characteristics
- Class & type: Chungmugong Yi Sun-sin-class destroyer
- Displacement: 4,800 t (4,700 long tons) standard; 5,000 t (4,900 long tons) full load
- Length: 150 m (492 ft 2 in)
- Beam: 17 m (55 ft 9 in)
- Propulsion: Combined diesel or gas
- Speed: 30 knots (56 km/h; 35 mph)
- Complement: 200
- Armament: 1 x 5"/54 caliber Mark 45 gun; 1 x Goalkeeper CIWS; 64 x VLS; 21 x RIM-116 Rolling Airframe Missile; 8 x RGM-84 Harpoon; 2 x triple K745 Blue Shark Torpedo

ROKS Chungmugong Yi Sun-sin (DDH-975) is a Chungmugong Yi Sun-sin-class destroyer in the Republic of Korea Navy. She is named after the Joseon Korean admiral Yi Sun-sin with his posthumous name, Chungmugong, literally “Lord of Loyal Valor”.

== Design ==
The KDX-II is part of a much larger build up program aimed at turning the ROKN into a blue-water navy. It is said to be the first stealthy major combatant in the ROKN and was designed to significantly increase the ROKN's capabilities.

== Construction and career ==
ROKS Chungmugong Yi Sun-sin was launched on 22 May 2002 by Daewoo Shipbuilding and commissioned in November 2003.

== Gallery ==
ROKS Chungmugong Yi Sun-sin Gallery

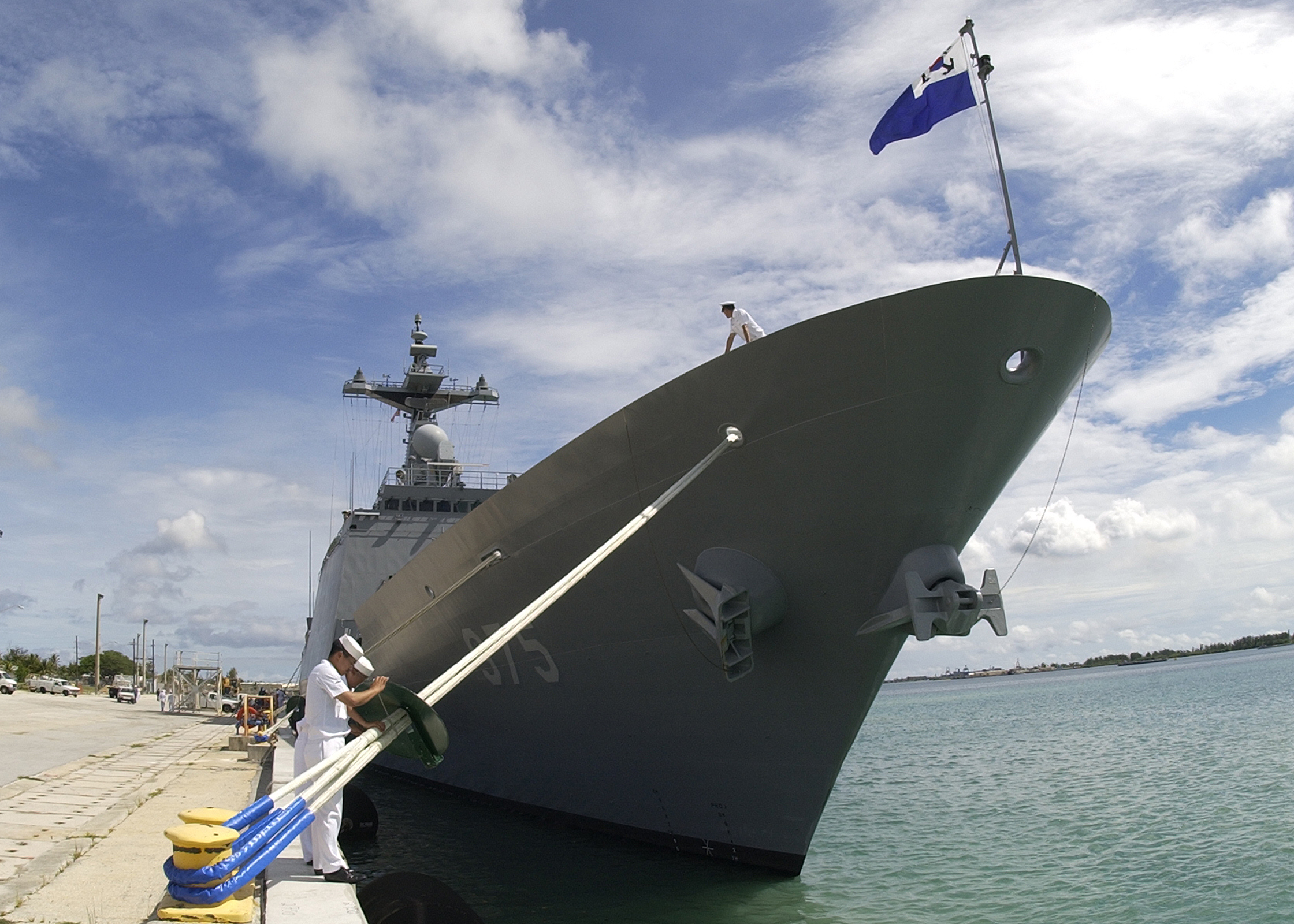
ROKS Chungmugong Yi Sun-shin docked in Apra Harbor, Hawaii on 14 June 2004.

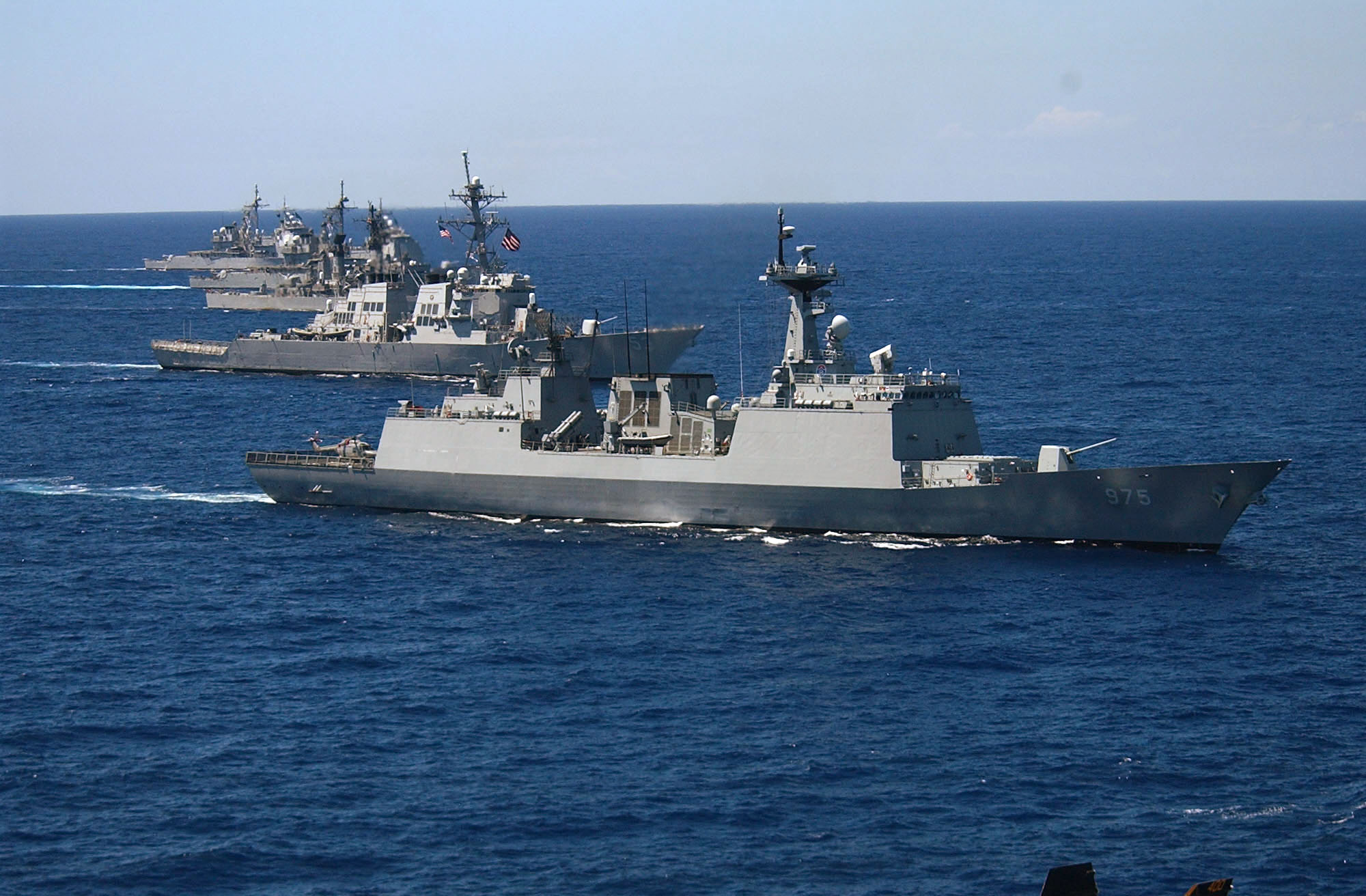
ROKS Chungmugong Yi Sun-shin and USS John Paul Jones alongside each other during RIMPAC 2004.

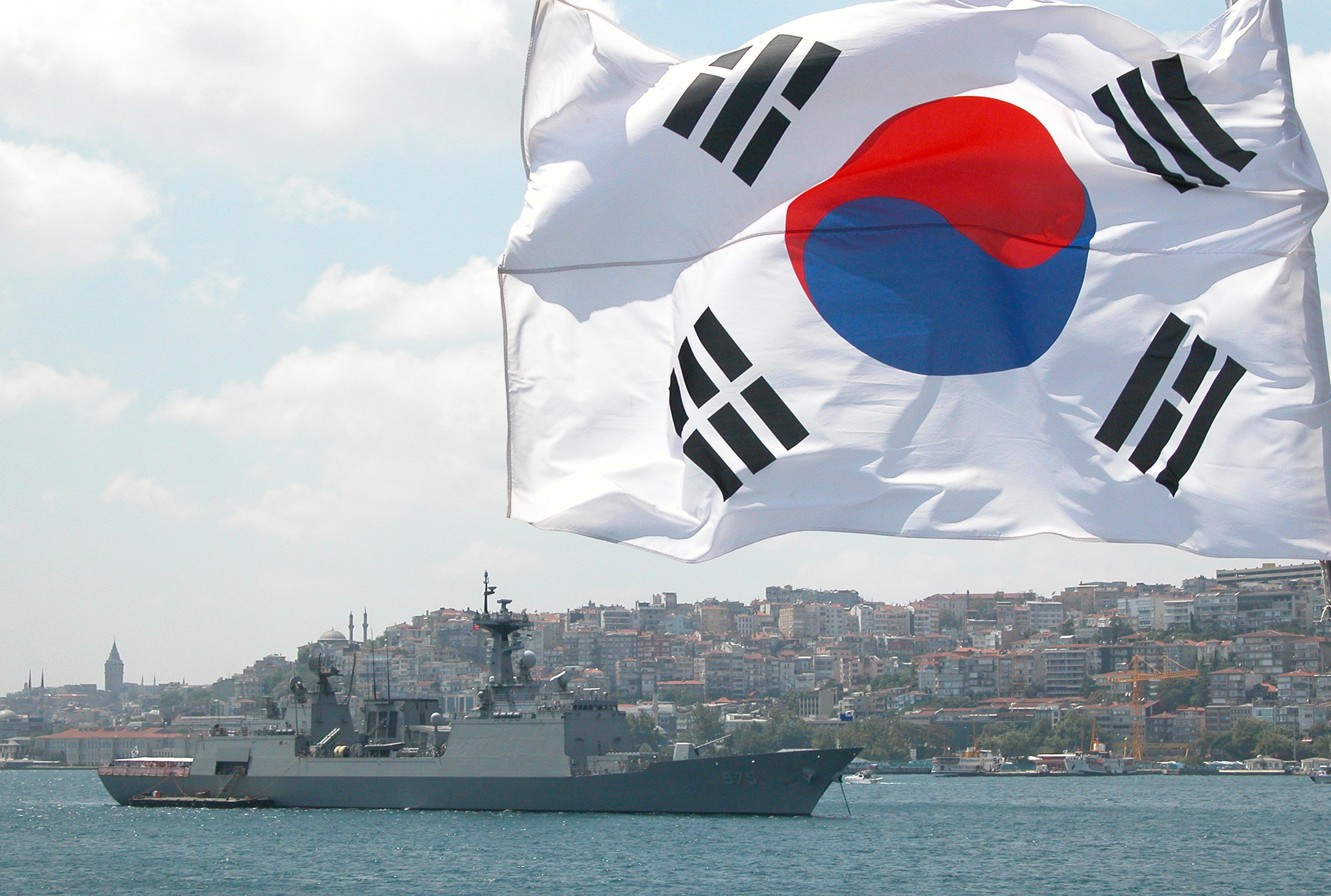
ROKS Chungmugong Yi Sun-shin participating in the Republic of Korea Navy Cruise Training Task Group on 30 July 2005.

ROKS Chungmugong Yi Sun-shin and ROKS Seoae Ryu Seong-ryong during an exercise in the Sea of Japan on 3 October 2013.
