= Australia–South Korea relations =

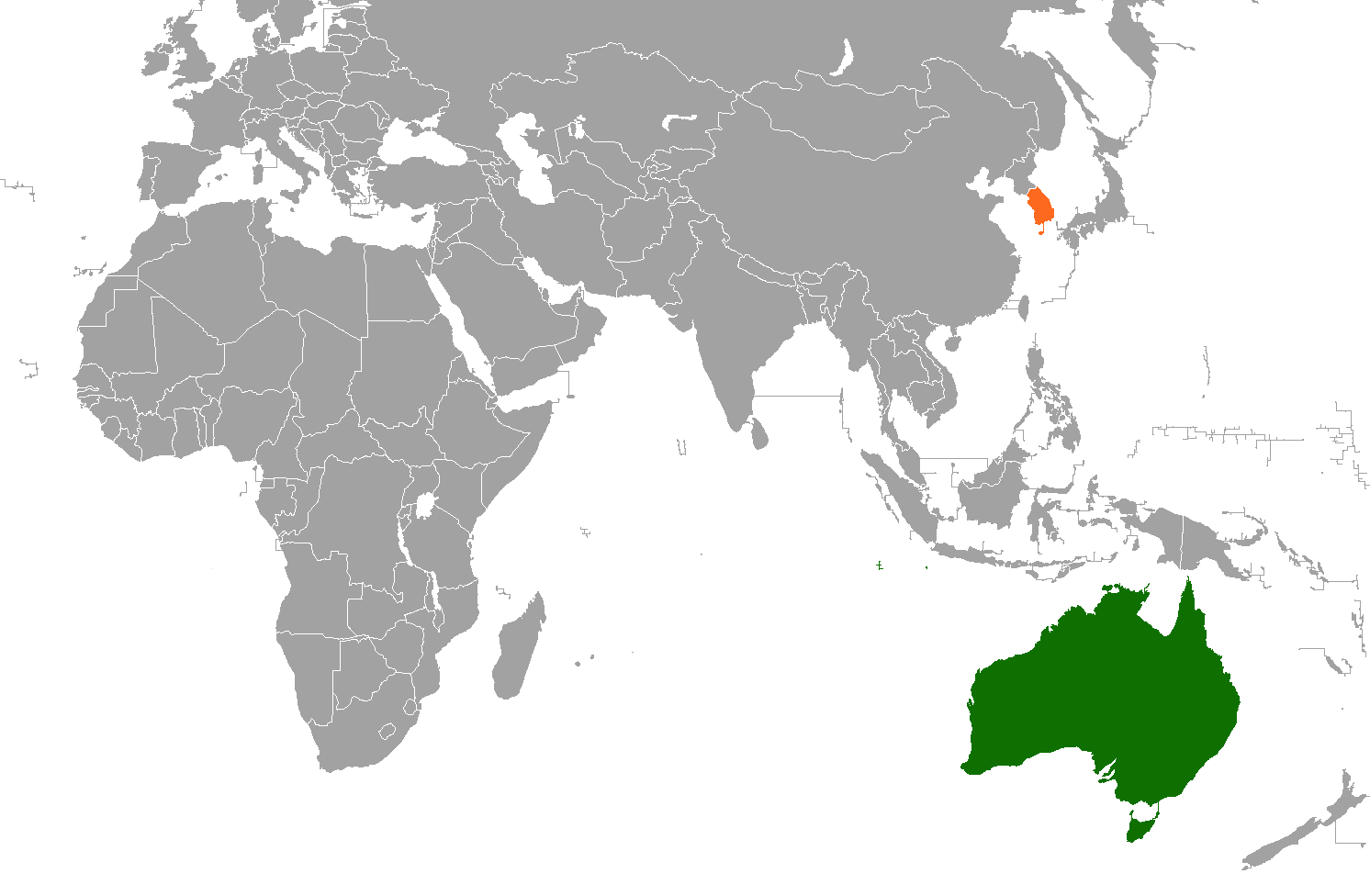

- Australia: South Korea

Diplomatic mission
- Embassy of Australia, Seoul: Embassy of South Korea, Canberra

Envoy
- Ambassador Catherine Raper: Ambassador; Sim Seung-seob

Bilateral relations exist between Australia and South Korea. Both countries established diplomatic relations on 30 October 1961.

Australia and South Korea are trading partners in the Asia-Pacific region. South Korea and Australia have a relationship that has reached very high ground in the last few years. South Korea has an embassy in Canberra and Australia has an embassy in Seoul.

Relations have expanded beyond economic and commercial links to other spheres, including tourism, culture, technology, AI, defense and scientific cooperation.

According to a 2017 BBC World Service Poll, 61% of Australians view South Korea's influence positively, and with 24% view of negatively.

== History ==
=== Relations between 1884 and 1950 ===
Prior to the 1950s, the two nations had relatively little contact with one another.

=== The Korean War ===
When the outbreak of the Korean War had reached across the globe, Australia quickly hurried to aid South Korea. The United States of America helped the Australians and the South Koreans in the war. Australia sent 17,000 troops to South Korea. Robert Menzies was Prime Minister at the time. In 1953 Australian troops pulled out of Korea by ceasefire agreement.

== Economic relations ==
Monthly value of Australian merchandise exports to South Korea (A$ millions) since 1988

Monthly value of South Korean merchandise exports to Australia (A$ millions) since 1988

South Korea and Australian relations are strong and are continuing to grow. Today South Korea and Australia share a very friendly and healthy relationship. Both are members of Asia Pacific Economic Cooperation. In 2000 Kim Dae Jung came to Canberra. In 2009 Korean President Lee Myung Bak visited Kevin Rudd in Canberra. The outcome of the meeting was very positive, with Australia and South Korea officially declaring a security pact, similar to that already in place between Australia and Japan. They discussed future cooperation and a Free Trade Agreement.

On December 12, 2014, Korea-Australia FTA was signed. And South Korea and Australia also agreed on currency swaps.

On September 23, 2019, Korea and Australia held a meeting of the heads of international finance and agreed to expand economic and financial cooperation.

=== Investment ===
South Korea's investment in Australia nearly tripled to $8.3 billion in 2011 to $19.4 billion in 2021. Australia's total investment in South Korea in 2021 was $17.6 billion.

== MIKTA ==
Australia and South Korea are intensifying cooperation and exchanges in MIKTA, a national consultative body composed of Mexico, Indonesia, South Korea, Turkey, and Australia.

== Korean Australian ==
Korean Australian is a person who has migrated from South Korea to Australia. Today Australia has the sixth biggest Korean community outside of Korea. Korean Australians number about 102,092 persons of Korean origin. The migration began in the 1970s and is still continuing the growth. In Australia according to MOFAT statistics 3348 Korean adoptees live in Australia. Since the late 1980s many Korean Australians come in under the business category required for economic growth. The Korean Australian population is a young population. There are also many Koreans studying in Australian Universities and schools. There are Korean populations in all capital cities. Most Koreans in Australia live in Sydney and Melbourne. Koreans in Australia have reached high standards in schooling, work and sport in Australia. AFL player Peter F. Bell who played for Fremantle Football Club and North Melbourne Football Club is of Korean origin.

== Resident diplomatic missions ==
- Australia has an embassy in Seoul.
- South Korea has an embassy in Canberra, a consulate-general in Sydney, a consulate in Melbourne, and a consular office in Brisbane.

Building hosting the Embassy of Australia in Seoul

== See also ==
- Foreign relations of Australia
- Foreign relations of South Korea
- Indo-Pacific Strategy of South Korea
