= Sim Seung-seob =

- 심승섭
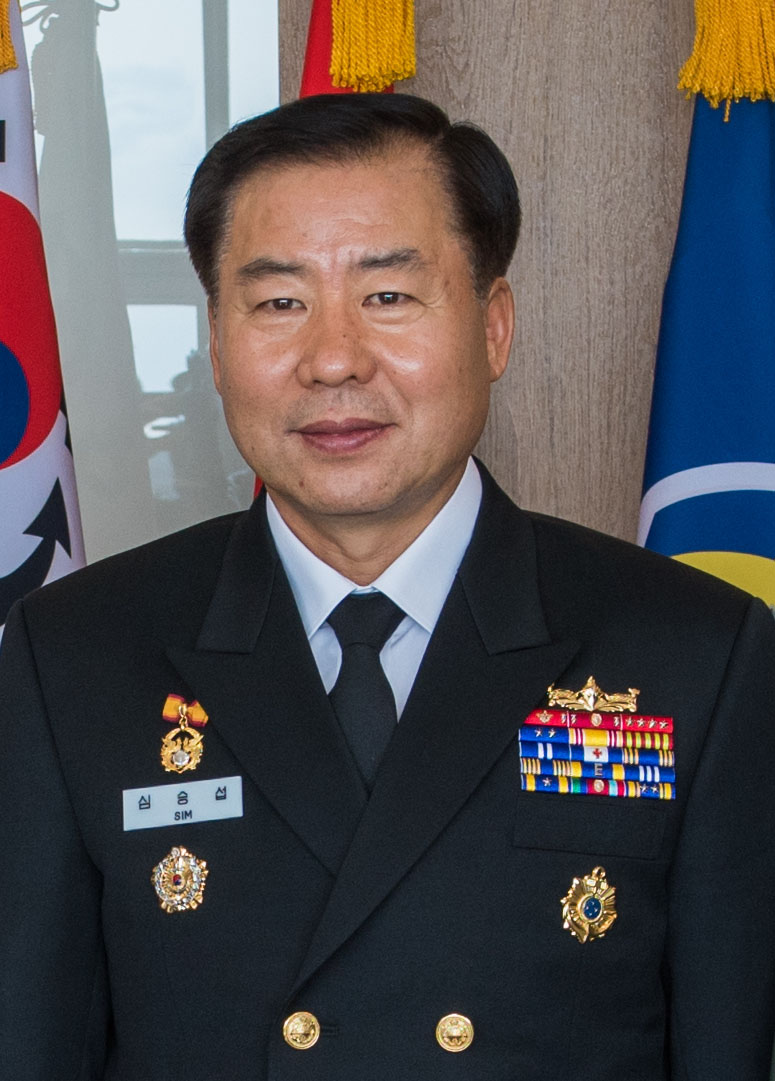
- Sim in 2018

South Korean Ambassador to Australia
- Incumbent
- Assumed office 2024
- President: Yoon Suk Yeol
- Prime Minister: Han Duck-soo
- Preceded by: Lee Jong-sup

Personal details
- Born: 28 January 1963 (age 63) Jeonbuk Province, South Korea
- Education: Korea Naval Academy

Military service
- Allegiance: South Korea
- Branch/service: Republic of Korea Navy
- Years of service: 1985-2020
- Rank: Admiral

Sim Seung-seob (Korean: 심승섭, born January 28, 1963) is the 33rd Chief of Naval Operations for the Republic of Korea Navy. He was sworn in on July 18, 2019.

He was born in Jeonbuk Province and attended the Korea Naval Academy. He previously held the position of Chief Directorate of Strategic Planning for the Joint Chiefs of Staff of the Republic of Korea and served as commander of the South Korean 1st Fleet. He holds the rank of Admiral.

== See also ==
- History of the Republic of Korea Navy
