= Chief of Naval Operations (South Korea) =

Head of the Republic of Korea Navy

Chief of Naval Operations of the Republic of Korea Navy
- 대한민국 해군참모총장
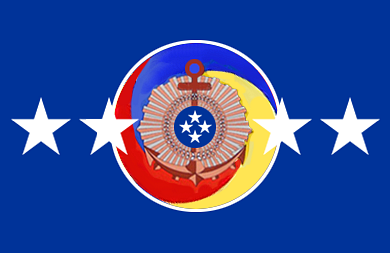
- Flag of the chief of naval operations
- Incumbent; Admiral Kang Dong-gil since 2 September 2025
- Ministry of National Defense
- Abbreviation: CNO
- Member of: Joint Chiefs of Staff
- Reports to: Chairman of the Joint Chiefs of Staff
- Appointer: The president
- Formation: 5 September 1948; 78 years ago
- First holder: Vice Admiral Sohn Won-yil
- Deputy: Vice Chief of Naval Operations of the Republic of Korea Navy

The chief of naval operations of the Republic of Korea Navy (Korean: 대한민국 해군참모총장; Hanja: 大韓民國海軍參謀總長) is the head of the Republic of Korea Navy (ROKN). The post was established following the induction of Joseon Coastal Guards (조선해안경비대) into the Republic of Korea Armed Forces and the subsequent renaming of the organization as the Republic of Korea Navy in 1948. Originally held by a vice admiral, the post of CNO has been held by an admiral since 1968.

The appointment of the CNO, along with the chiefs of staff of the Army, chiefs of staff of the Air Force and the chairman of the Joint Chiefs of Staff, is referred to the State Council of South Korea for deliberation according to Article 89, Constitution of South Korea.

== List of the chiefs of naval operations ==
| No. | Portrait | Chief of Naval Operations | Took office | Left office | Time in office |
|---|---|---|---|---|---|
| 1 | Sohn Won-yil | Vice Admiral; Sohn Won-yil (1909–1980) | 5 September 1948 | 30 June 1953 | 4 years, 298 days |
| 2 | Park Ok-kyu | Vice Admiral; Park Ok-kyu (1901–1971) | 30 June 1953 | 1 November 1954 | 1 year, 124 days |
| 3 | Chong Kung-mo | Vice Admiral; Chong Kung-mo (1914–1980) | 1 November 1954 | 23 February 1959 | 4 years, 114 days |
| 4 | Lee Yong-woon | Vice Admiral; Lee Yong-woon (1915–1987) | 23 February 1959 | 28 September 1960 | 1 year, 218 days |
| 5 | Lee Sung-ho | Vice Admiral; Lee Sung-ho (1926–2019) | 28 September 1960 | 28 September 1962 | 2 years, 0 days |
| 6 | Lee Maeng-kee | Vice Admiral; Lee Maeng-kee (1925–2004) | 28 September 1962 | 10 September 1964 | 1 year, 348 days |
| 7 | Hahm Myong-soo | Vice Admiral; Hahm Myong-soo (1928–2016) | 10 September 1964 | 1 September 1966 | 1 year, 356 days |
| 8 | Kim Yong-kwan | Admiral; Kim Yong-kwan (1925–2021) | 1 September 1966 | 1 April 1969 | 2 years, 212 days |
| 9 | Chang Chi-su | Admiral; Chang Chi-su (1928–2008) | 1 April 1969 | 1 April 1972 | 3 years, 0 days |
| 10 | Kim Kyu-sop | Admiral; Kim Kyu-sop (1929–2018) | 1 April 1972 | 28 February 1974 | 1 year, 333 days |
| 11 | Hwang Chong-yon | Admiral; Hwang Chong-yon (1928–2012) | 28 February 1974 | 17 April 1979 | 5 years, 48 days |
| 12 | Kim Chong-kon | Admiral; Kim Chong-kon (1930–2022) | 17 April 1979 | 14 May 1981 | 2 years, 27 days |
| 13 | Lee Un-su | Admiral; Lee Un-su (born 1930) | 14 May 1981 | 28 December 1982 | 1 year, 228 days |
| 14 | Oh Kyung-hwan | Admiral; Oh Kyung-hwan (1931–2021) | 28 December 1982 | 4 September 1984 | 1 year, 251 days |
| 15 | Choe Sang-hwa | Admiral; Choe Sang-hwa (born 1931) | 4 September 1984 | 4 September 1987 | 3 years, 0 days |
| 16 | Kim Chong-ho | Admiral; Kim Chong-ho (1933–2014) | 4 September 1987 | 4 September 1989 | 2 years, 0 days |
| 17 | Kim Chong-ho | Admiral; Kim Chong-ho (born 1936) | 4 September 1989 | 4 September 1991 | 2 years, 0 days |
| 18 | Kim Chul-woo: p202 | Admiral; Kim Chul-woo (1936–2019) | 4 September 1991 | 26 May 1993 | 1 year, 264 days |
| 19 | Kim Hong-yeol: p219 | Admiral; Kim Hong-yeol (born 1939) | 26 May 1993 | 1 April 1995 | 1 year, 310 days |
| 20 | An Pyong-tae: p412 | Admiral; An Pyong-tae (born 1939) | 1 April 1995 | 1 April 1997 | 2 years, 0 days |
| 21 | Yu Sam-nam: p457 | Admiral; Yu Sam-nam (born 1941) | 1 April 1997 | 1 April 1999 | 2 years, 0 days |
| 22 | Lee Soo-yong: p550 | Admiral; Lee Soo-yong (born 1942) | 1 April 1999 | 31 March 2001 | 1 year, 364 days |
| 23 | Chang Jeong-kil | Admiral; Chang Jeong-kil (born 1944) | 1 April 2001 | 31 March 2003 | 1 year, 364 days |
| 24 | Moon Jeong-il | Admiral; Moon Jeong-il (born 1944) | 1 April 2003 | 29 March 2005 | 1 year, 362 days |
| 25 | Nam Hae-il | Admiral; Nam Hae-il (born 1947) | 29 March 2005 | 17 November 2006 | 1 year, 233 days |
| 26 | Song Young-moo | Admiral; Song Young-moo (born 1949) | 17 November 2006 | 20 March 2008 | 1 year, 124 days |
| 27 | Jung Ok-keun | Admiral; Jung Ok-keun (born 1952) | 20 March 2008 | 19 March 2010 | 1 year, 364 days |
| 28 | Kim Sung-chan | Admiral; Kim Sung-chan (born 1954) | 19 March 2010 | 17 October 2011 | 1 year, 212 days |
| 29 | Choi Yoon-hee | Admiral; Choi Yoon-hee (born 1953) | 17 October 2011 | 28 September 2013 | 1 year, 346 days |
| 30 | Hwang Ki-chul | Admiral; Hwang Ki-chul (born 1956) | 28 September 2013 | 27 February 2015 | 1 year, 152 days |
| 31 | Jung Ho-sub | Admiral; Jung Ho-sub (born 1958) | 27 February 2015 | 22 September 2016 | 1 year, 208 days |
| 32 | Um Hyun-seong | Admiral; Um Hyun-seong (born 1958) | 22 September 2016 | 19 July 2018 | 1 year, 300 days |
| 33 | Sim Seung-seob | Admiral; Sim Seung-seob (born 1963) | 19 July 2018 | 10 April 2020 | 1 year, 266 days |
| 34 | Boo Suk-jong | Admiral; Boo Suk-jong (born 1964) | 10 April 2020 | 16 December 2021 | 1 year, 250 days |
| 35 | Kim Jung-soo | Admiral; Kim Jung-soo (born 1965) | 16 December 2021 | 27 May 2022 | 162 days |
| 36 | Lee Jong-ho | Admiral; Lee Jong-ho (born 1965) | 27 May 2022 | 31 October 2023 | 1 year, 157 days |
| 37 | Yang Yong-mo | Admiral; Yang Yong-mo (born 1967) | 7 November 2023 | Incumbent | 2 years, 304 days |
