= Shin Tae-young =

South Korean politician (1891–1959)

- 신태영
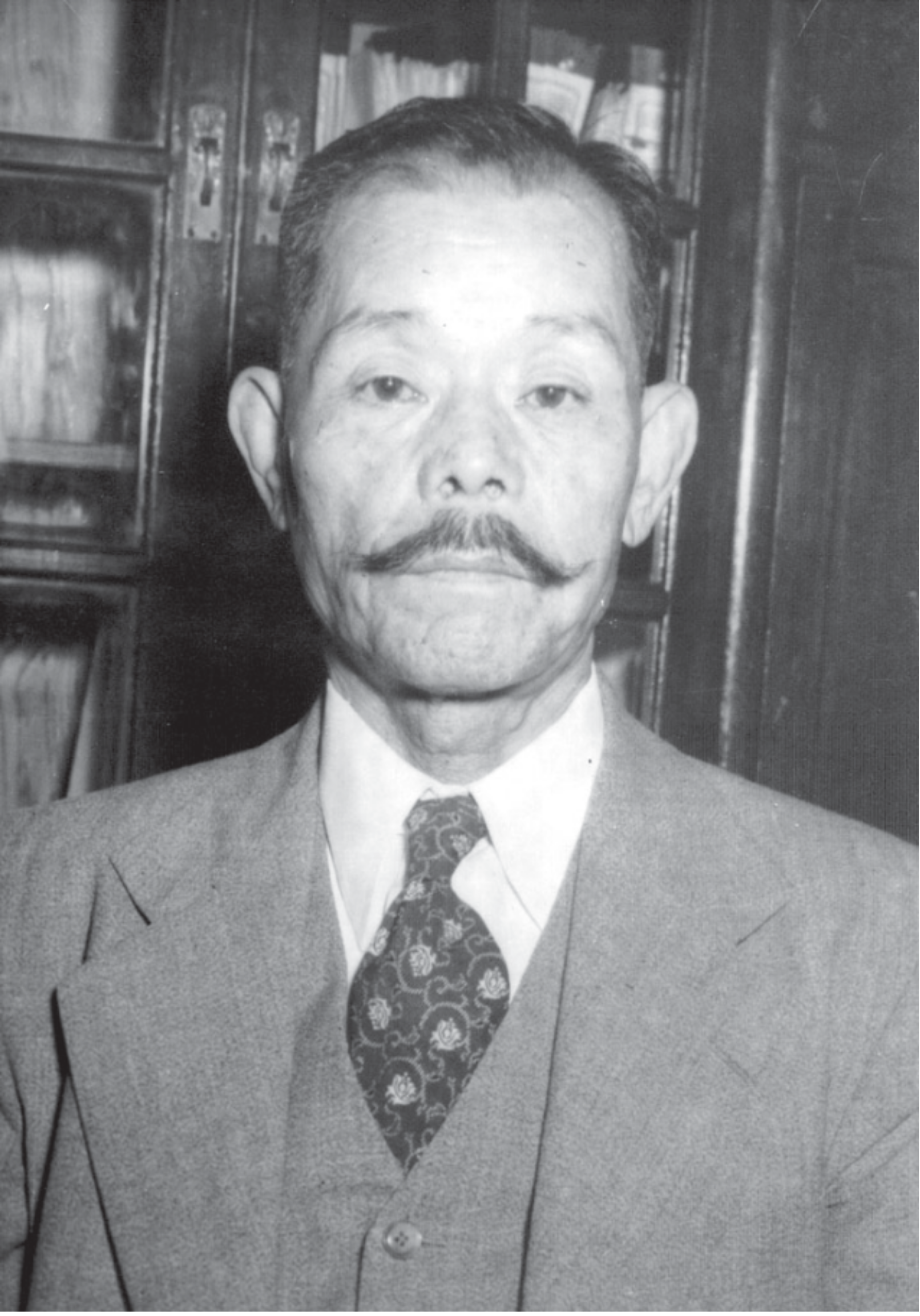

Minister of National Defense
- In office 29 March 1952 – 30 June 1953
- President: Syngman Rhee
- Preceded by: Lee Ki-poong
- Succeeded by: Sohn Won-yil

Chief of Staff of the Republic of Korea Army
- In office 1 October 1949 – 9 April 1950
- Preceded by: Chae Byong-duk
- Succeeded by: Chae Byong-duk

Personal details
- Born: 1 February 1891 Seoul, Joseon
- Died: 8 April 1959 (aged 68) Seoul, South Korea
- Resting place: Seoul National Cemetery
- Citizenship: South Korean
- Party: Independent

Military service
- Allegiance: Empire of Japan; South Korea (1948–1959)
- Branch/service: Imperial Japanese Army; Republic of Korea Army (1948–1959)
- Rank: Lieutenant general
- Battles/wars: Korean War

Shin Tae-young (Korean: 신태영; Japanese name: Hirayama Sukehide; February 1, 1891 – April 8, 1959) was a South Korean military officer and politician. He was designated as a pro-Japanese collaborator due to his activities as an Imperial Japanese Army officer and a military instructor involved in student mobilization, where he cooperated with propaganda efforts to recruit troops and support Japan's wars of aggression.

== Biography ==
Born in Hanseong-bu, he entered the Korean Empire's Army Cadet School at the age of 14 and subsequently studied at the Military Academy.

In 1912, he entered the Imperial Japanese Army Academy and graduated on May 28, 1914, as part of the 26th class. Among his graduating cohort were 13 Koreans, including Hong Sa-ik (who later became a lieutenant general in the Japanese Imperial Army), Ji Cheong-cheon, Lee Eung-jun, and Jo Cheol-ho.

During the Siberian Intervention—triggered by the Russian Revolution of 1917 Shin participated in Japan's war of aggression as an officer in a Japanese regiment deployed to northern Manchuria. By the time of the Pacific War, he held the rank of lieutenant colonel in the Imperial Japanese Army. Notably, around 1943, he participated in the "Jongno Committee for the Promotion of the Provisional Special Volunteer Soldier System," which aimed to mobilize students for the war, thereby cooperating with propaganda and agitation efforts to recruit troops.

In November 1948, he was appointed Director of the Administrative Staff at Army Headquarters and Director of the First Bureau of the Ministry of National Defense, holding the rank of colonel.

Promoted to brigadier general in 1949, he served as Chief of Staff of the Homeland Defense Force. In October 1949, he was promoted to major general and appointed the third Chief of Staff of the Republic of Korea Army, but he voluntarily resigned in April 1950, just seven months into his tenure due to disagreements with the Ministry of National Defense leadership and a divergence in views regarding the political situation compared to American advisors, who held an overly optimistic outlook.

With the outbreak of the Korean War, he took charge of regional defense as the Commander of the Jeollabuk-do Army District Command. However, he clashed with then-Defense Minister Shin Song-mo over operational strategy and was subsequently relieved of his command in July 1950. He was reinstated in January 1952 and immediately promoted to lieutenant general. Two months later, in March 1952, he retired from active duty as a lieutenant general and was appointed Minister of National Defense, serving for one year and three months until just before the armistice agreement was signed. That same year, he also served as President of the Republic of Korea Veterans Association (then known as the Korean Veterans' Guidance Association).

He died in 1959 and was laid to rest in the Generals' Section No. 2 at the Seoul National Cemetery.
