= Sohn Won-yil =

South Korean admiral

- 손원일
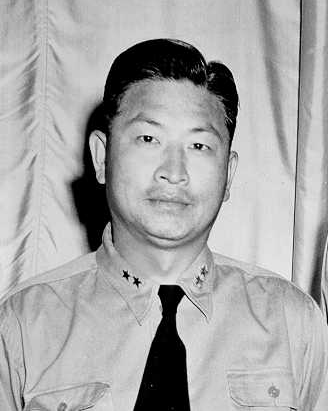
- Sohn in 1949, during his tenure as a rear admiral.

5th Minister of National Defense
- In office June 30, 1953 – May 26, 1956
- President: Syngman Rhee
- Prime Minister: Paik Too-chin; Pyone Young Tae
- Vice President: Ham Tae-young
- Preceded by: Shin Tae-young
- Succeeded by: Kim Yong-woo

Korean name
- Hangul: 손원일
- Hanja: 孫元一
- RR: Son Wonil
- MR: Son Wŏnil

Sohn Won-yil (June 22, 1909 in Nampo – February 15, 1980) was a South Korean naval vice admiral best known for being the first Chief of Naval Operations (CNO) of the Republic of Korea Navy. As one of the founding members of the Republic of Korea Navy, Sohn is generally regarded as the founder of the South Korean navy.

== Career ==
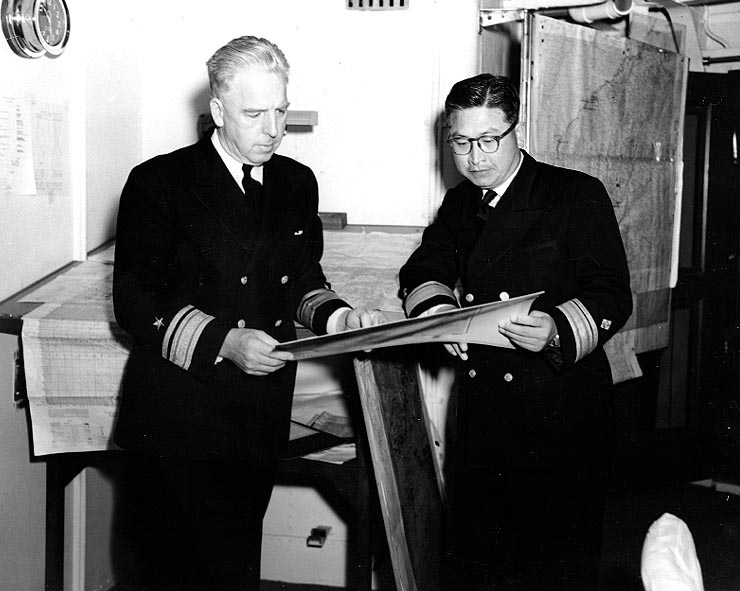
ROKN CNO Read Adm. Sohn Won-yil discussing Korean War operations with Rear Adm. A.E. Smith, USN

Shortly after Korea was liberated from the Empire of Japan on August 15, 1945, Sohn Won-yil, a former merchant mariner and son of the independence activist Sohn Jung-do, led the Maritime Affairs Association. The Association evolved into the Marine Defense Group on November 11, 1945 (later became Navy Foundation Day) and later became the Korean Coast Guard, which was formed in Jinhae. After the new Republic of Korea government was established on August 15, 1948, the Korean Coast Guard has formally renamed the Republic of Korea Navy, and Sohn became the first Chief of Naval Operations of the ROK Navy on September 5, 1948.

After being relieved from the service, he was appointed as the fifth Minister of National Defense, and the first ambassador to West Germany.

== Legacy ==
In honor of Sohn, the ROKS Sohn Won-yil (SS 072), the first of Sohn Won-yil class submarines, was commissioned in 2007, and named after him.
