= Nam Hae-il =

Chief of Naval Operations of the Republic of Korea Navy

- Born: 13 April 1947 (age 79); Gangwon Province, Southern Korea
- Occupation: Naval officer
- Military career
- Allegiance: South Korea
- Branch: Republic of Korea Navy

Nam Hae-il (Korean: 남해일, born April 13, 1947) is a former South Korean naval officer who served as the 25th Chief of Naval Operations of the Republic of Korea Navy, appointed in 2005. He attended the Republic of Korea Naval Academy in 1972 and Naval War college in 1978.
