= Kim Bong-ho =

South Korean politician (born 1933)

- 김봉호

Vice Speaker of the National Assembly
- In office 1998–2000

Member of the National Assembly
- In office 1978–2000
- Constituency: Haenam–Jindo

Personal details
- Born: May 10, 1933 (age 93) Haenam County, Jeollanam, South Korea
- Party: Democratic Party of Korea (Former)
- Relatives: Jang Jin-young (daughter-in-law)
- Education: Chonnam National University (BS, Hon. Ph.D.)

Kim Bong-ho (Korean: 김봉호; born May 10, 1933) is a South Korean politician and social activist who served as the Vice Speaker of the 15th National Assembly from 1998 to 2000. He is a prominent five-term legislator representing the Haenam and Jindo constituencies.

== Early life and education ==
Kim was born in 1933 in Haenam, South Jeolla Province. He graduated from the College of Agriculture at Chonnam National University with a Bachelor of Science (B.S.) degree. In recognition of his lifelong dedication to national governance and regional development, Chonnam National University awarded him an honorary doctorate in political science in 1999.

== Political career ==
Kim's legislative career spanned over two decades, during which he was elected to the 10th, 12th, 13th, 14th, and 15th National Assemblies.

During the democratic transition era, he held key leadership roles, including:

- Secretary-General of the Peace Democratic Party and the Democratic Party.
- Chairman of the National Assembly Economic and Science Committee.
- Chairman of the Central Executive Committee of the New Politics National Congress.

In 1998, he was elected as the Vice Speaker (Deputy Speaker) of the National Assembly, where he played a pivotal role in parliamentary diplomacy and legislative reform.

== Personal life ==
Kim is the father of essayist and university professor Kim Young-kyun. His family drew significant public interest due to his daughter-in-law, the actress Jang Jin-young, who died in 2009.
