= ROKS Wang Geon =

Chungmugong Yi Sun-sin-class destroyer

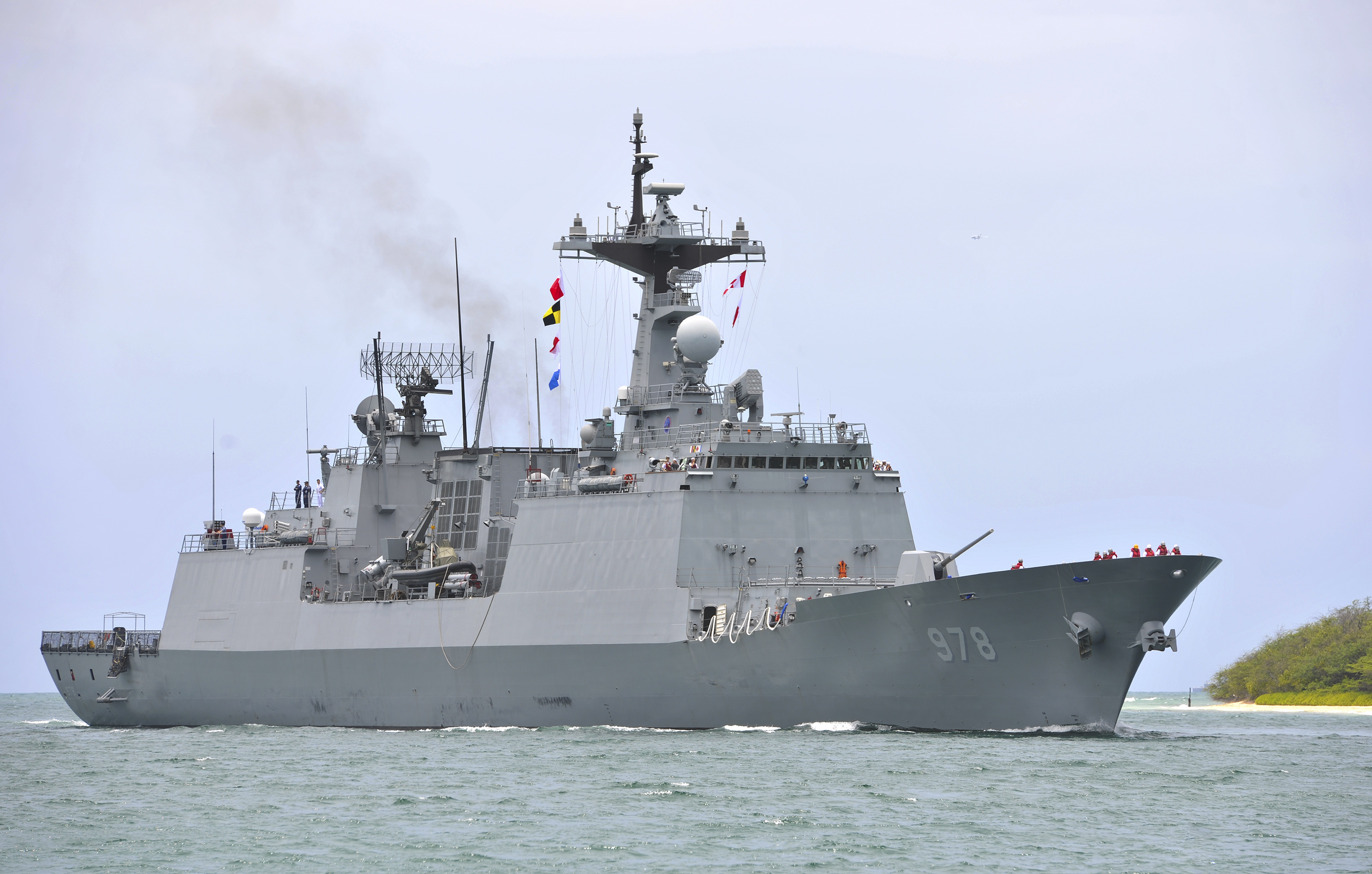
- ROKS Wang Geon entering Pearl Harbor during RIMPAC 2014

History

South Korea
- Name: Wang Geon; (왕건)
- Namesake: Wang Geon
- Builder: Hyundai
- Launched: 4 May 2005
- Commissioned: 10 November 2006
- Identification: Pennant number: DDH-978
- Status: Active

General characteristics
- Class & type: Chungmugong Yi Sun-sin-class destroyer
- Displacement: 4,800 t (4,700 long tons) standard; 5,000 t (4,900 long tons) full load
- Length: 150 m (492 ft 2 in)
- Beam: 17 m (55 ft 9 in)
- Propulsion: Combined diesel or gas
- Speed: 30 knots (56 km/h; 35 mph)
- Complement: 200
- Armament: 1 x 5"/54 caliber Mark 45 gun; 1 x Goalkeeper CIWS; 64 x VLS; 21 x RIM-116 Rolling Airframe Missile; 8 x RGM-84 Harpoon; 2 x triple K745 Blue Shark Torpedo

ROKS Wang Geon (DDH-978) is a Chungmugong Yi Sun-sin-class destroyer in the Republic of Korea Navy. She is named after Wang Geon.

== Design ==
The KDX-II is part of a much larger build up program aimed at turning the ROKN into a blue-water navy. It is said to be the first stealthy major combatant in the ROKN and was designed to significantly increase the ROKN's capabilities.

== Construction and career ==
ROKS Wang Geon was launched on 4 May 2005 by Hyundai Heavy Industries and commissioned on 10 November 2006.

=== RIMPAC 2014 ===
ROKS Wang Geon, ROKS Seoae Ryu Seong-ryong and a Jang Bogo-class submarine participated in RIMPAC 2014 from 26 June to 1 August 2014.

== Gallery ==
ROKS Wang Geon Gallery

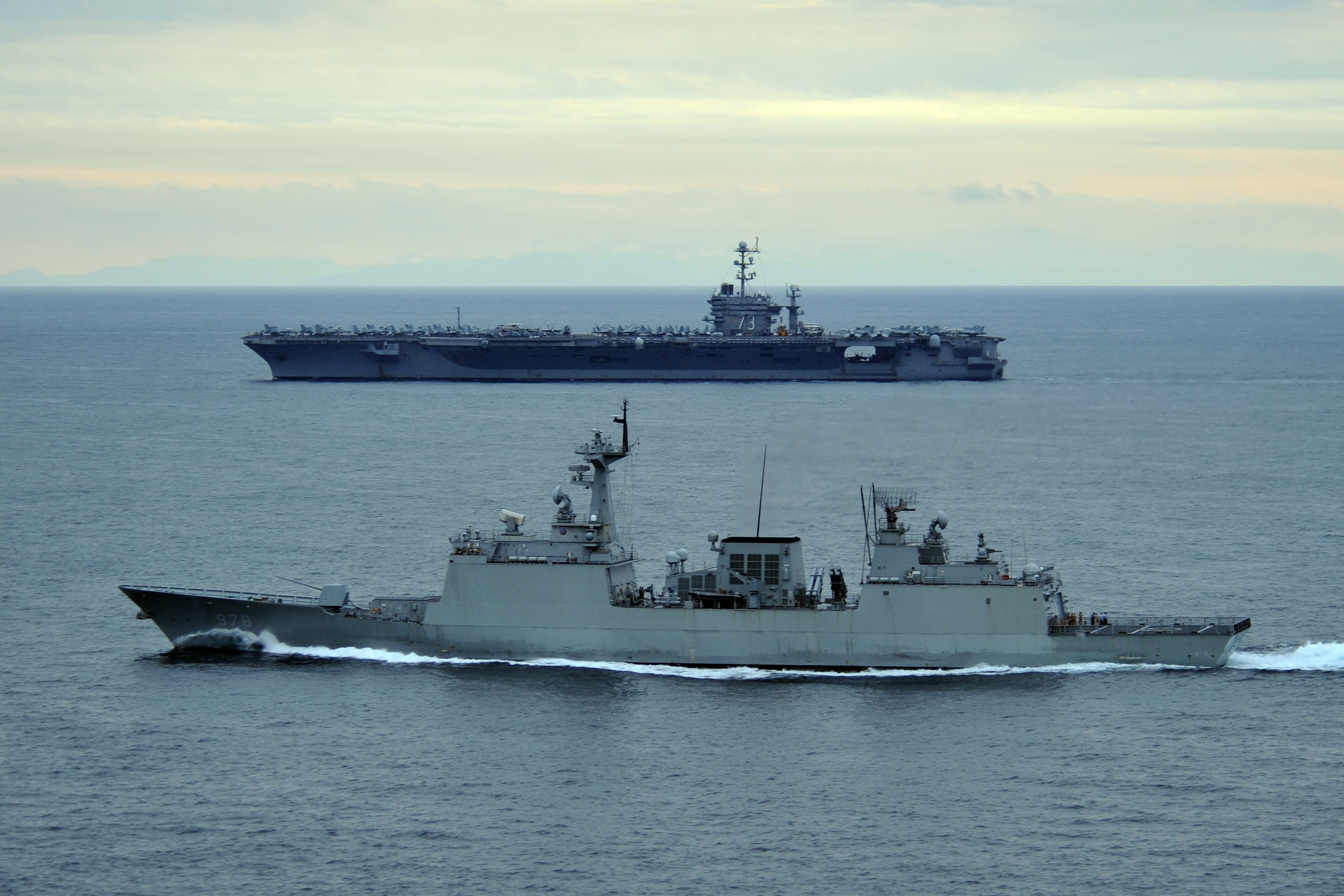
ROKS Wang Geon alongside USS George Washington on a patrol on 29 September 2011.

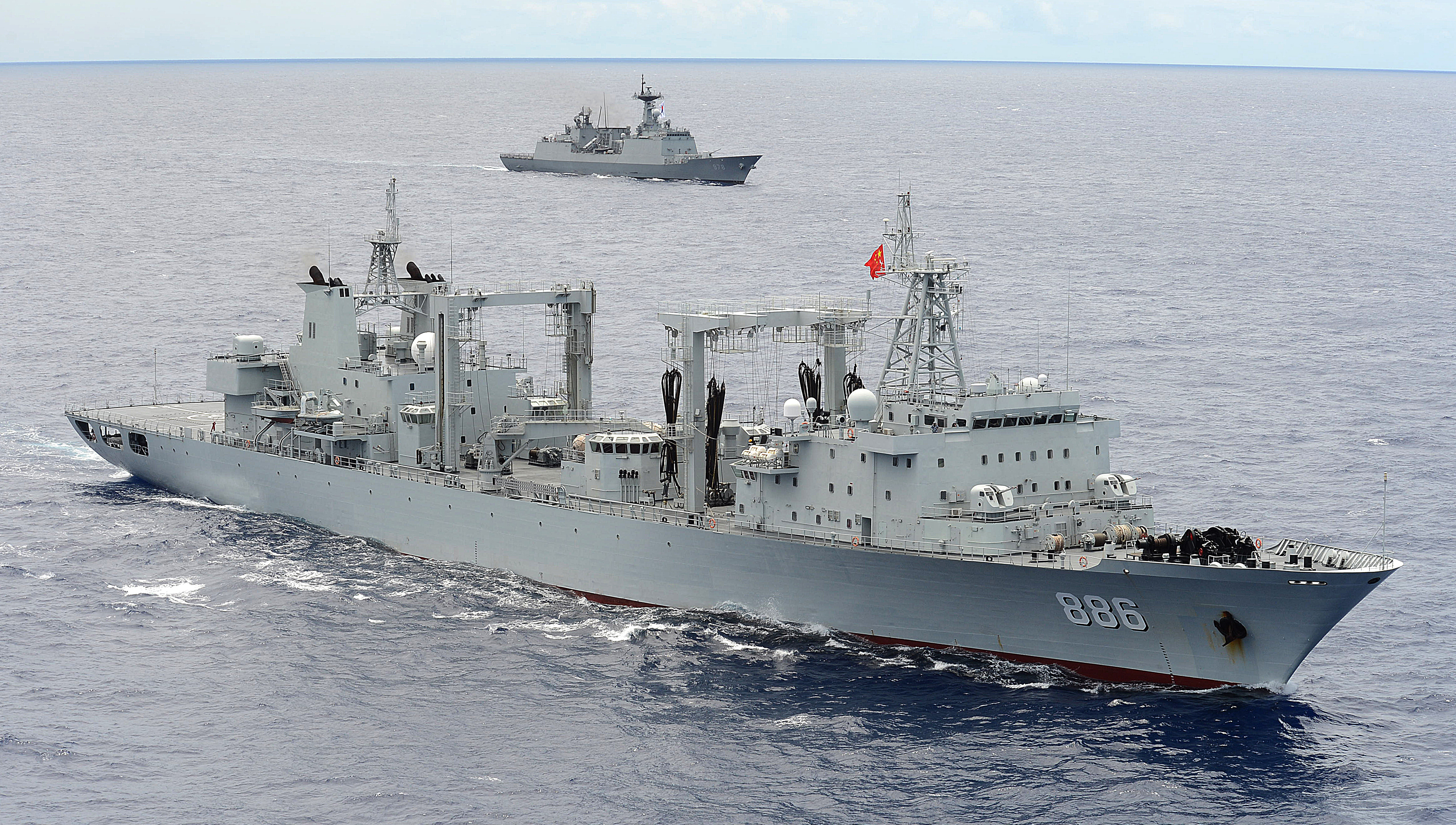
PLAN Qiandaohu and ROKS Wang Geon during RIMPAC 2014.

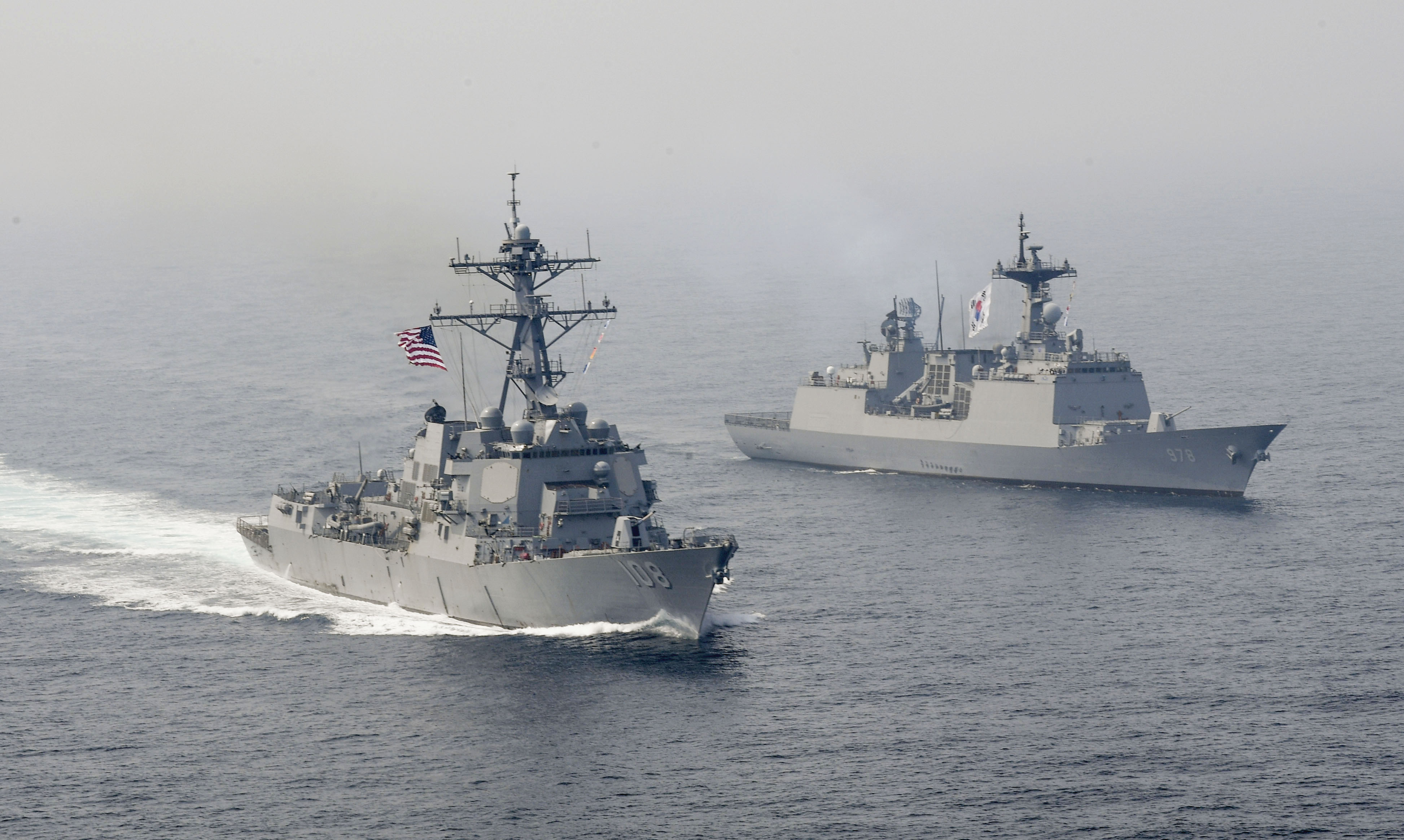
USS Wayne E. Meyer and ROKS Wang Geon in a bilateral exercise on 24 April 2017.
