= Kyungnam University =

Private university in Changwon, South Korea

- 경남대학교 慶南大學校
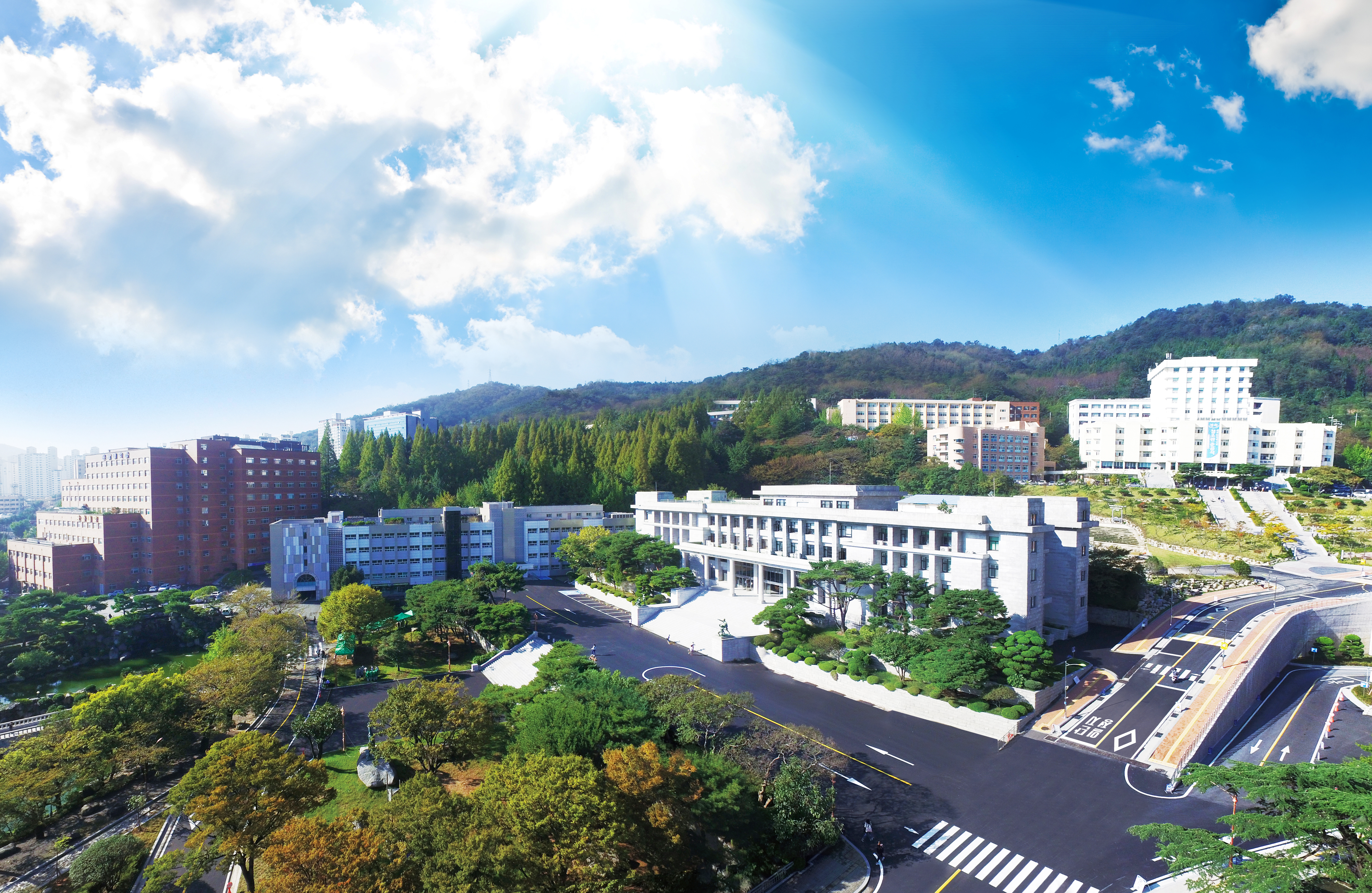
- Motto: Truth, Freedom, and Creation
- Type: Private
- Established: 1946
- President: Park Jae-kyu
- Academic staff: 900 (2013)
- Students: 17,000
- Undergraduates: 15,000
- Postgraduates: 2,000
- Location: Changwon, South Gyeongsang, South Korea; 35°10′49″N 128°33′12″E
- Campus: Urban
- Colors: Sky blue
- Nickname: Kyung Dae
- Mascot: Horse called "HANMA"

Korean name
- Hangul: 경남대학교
- Hanja: 慶南大學校
- RR: Gyeongnam daehakgyo
- MR: Kyŏngnam taehakkyo

Kyungnam University (Korean: 경남대학교; Hanja: 慶南大學校) is a private university in Changwon, South Gyeongsang Province, South Korea. The university has six colleges, including Liberal Arts, Natural Sciences, Education, Economics and Commerce, Law and Politics, and Engineering colleges. Its 15 research institutions (including the Institute for Far Eastern Studies in Seoul) work to facilitate individual research and cooperative partnership activities with academia, industry, and government. It also has 65 sister universities in 19 different countries, under the university's motto of 'Truth, Freedom, and Creation'.

== History ==
Founded in 1946 as Kookmin College in Seoul, the Korean War created a situation in which it was advantageous to move south rather than staying in the Seoul area. In 1952, Kookmin College was rechristened Haein College and then in 1956, the college relocated to Korea's southern coast and has been in the city of Masan since that time. In 1961, the institution was renamed Masan College.
