= Republic of Korea Naval Academy =

Military academy

Coordinates: 35°07′44″N 128°39′53″E

- 해군사관학교
- Motto: 진리를 구하자 · 허위를 버리자 · 희생하자
- Motto in English: Let us pursue the truth. Let us forsake falsehood. Let us sacrifice ourselves.
- Type: Naval Military Academy
- Established: 1946
- Students: Midshipmen of the Republic of Korea Navy
- Location: Jinhae, South Gyeongsang Province, South Korea
- Website: English

The Republic of Korea Naval Academy is a four-year military academy located in Jinhae, South Korea. Established in 1946, it is the oldest of the 3 service academies of Korea. The school educates naval midshipmen for commissioning primarily into the Republic of Korea Navy and the Republic of Korea Marine Corps, and is administered by a superintendent with the rank of vice admiral.

== Location ==
The ROKNA is located in Jinhae, a district of Changwon, South Korea. Jinhae is almost completely surrounded by mountains covered with pine trees. This city is famous for its annual cherry blossom festival, called Gunhangje (Naval Port Festival), every spring. The festival, which started in 1963, is an artistic and cultural event. The city also hosts global events with the promotion of arts and flowers.

The reason why the Naval Academy is located in Jinhae is that Jinhae is a strategically important location. Before ROKNA was founded, the Japanese army used Jinhae as a military base. There are many islands in the sea in front of the Naval Academy which makes waves weaker, making the port both safe for use and hard to access for an enemy fleet.

== Campus ==
Choongmoo-Gwan

The first building is Choongmoo-Gwan, also known as the headquarters of the Naval Academy. Built in January 2002, the building houses many officers related to the Naval Academy's programs. The superintendent also works in this building, situated in the center of the Naval Academy.

Tonghae-Gwan

Tonghae Center is the latest building in the ROKNA. It has many classrooms with sophisticated facilities, including a school library and a DVD center.

Sebyung-Gwan

Sebyung-Gwan is a dormitory for all midshipmen of the academy. The name derives from the building used by Admiral Yi. This building contains modern technology and is divided into two parts: east and west, with one company living in each sector. On the sixth floor is Myeong-ryang Hall, a dining hall.

== Admissions ==
The number of admitted applicants can be changed, but 10% of admitted applicants are female. The Naval Academy's admission rate is, depending on the year, from 2% to 5%. The period of education is four years.

Eligibility Requirements

1. Must be a Republic of Korea citizen.
2. Must have good moral character.
3. Must be unmarried.
4. Must have graduated from high school or be scheduled to graduate from high school, or have a qualified high school graduation certificate issued by the Ministry of Education and Human Resources Development.
5. Must not have been dismissed from the government or the military or sentenced to any penalty other than confinement.

== Curriculum ==
Midshipmen can choose from nine majors: naval architecture, weapons systems, electrical engineering, management science, oceanography, computer science, military strategy, international relations, and foreign language.

A midshipman's curriculum begins with semi-entrance training and orientation, including significant training on the military and the spirit of the soldier. During this period, regular citizens and high school students become soldiers. After five weeks of training, new first-year students officially enter the Naval Academy. At this time, they declare that they will dedicate their life to the military. The duty-changing ceremony and honor company appointment ceremony take place as well. Because of the combined inaugural ceremony, the Naval Academy holds only the graduation ceremony.

After this ceremony, the first semester begins. The bottom transfer ceremony takes place about three weeks after starting the semester. It has five parts: martial arts, dancing, singing band, singing together, and symbols. From this time, the first-year students' title is changed to "bottom," and they learn about "bottom life."

First-semester midterm exam: This is the year's first examination. Midshipmen take it without a supervisor.

First-semester final exam: This is the last exam of the first semester.

Military practice: After the end of the first semester, midshipmen get military practice, and first-year students, sophomores, juniors, and seniors each get different practices.

Combat swimming: Midshipmen practice swimming for a week and swim around the five-kilometer-long Seo-do Island.

Armed Forces Day parade: This is one of the most important events for the Korean Armed Forces. The midshipmen in the ROKNA and all cadets in Korea participate on this day and take part in a parade. For this annual event, the midshipmen exercise for one to two weeks.

== Practice and Training ==
Plebe Training (Boot Camp) The training is for plebes, whose purpose is to transition from civilian to soldier. It generally starts in mid-January and ends after five weeks in mid-February. It consists of five weeks of training in obedience, patience, perseverance, victory, and honor. Plebes discipline their bodies and spirits to be midshipmen and learn basic things about the Navy through this training.

Practice Amphibious Operation (Freshman) The purpose of this practice is to understand the Marine Corps and discipline themselves for more muscular bodies and spirits during four weeks in Pohang in July. Freshmen experience the Marines' amphibious operations, ranger, and airborne training.

Practice Maritime and Adapting Ship (Sophomore) This practice aims to understand basic things about ships and the Navy and adapt to a maritime environment. Sophomores visit active ships and Naval units, train with SSU or UDT, and learn scuba diving to get an ‘open water’ license.

Coast Navigate Training (Junior) The purpose of this practice is to learn how to administer a ship and understand coalition operations. During four weeks in July, Juniors board Navy ships (LST, PCC, MLS) to navigate the Korean coast and visit the main military commanders near the main ports.

Cruise Training (Senior) This practice aims to develop a perspective on national policies and international perception. They also learn ensign abilities. During this term, midshipmen visit many countries around the world. Then, they enhance their national prestige and diplomacy (such as a parade, tae-kwon-do performance, and reception on the ship) while they are there. Cruise Training commonly takes three to five months.

== Annual Events ==
Induction Ceremony After taking a special 5-week training, plebes can become regular midshipmen. The Induction Ceremony at the ROK Naval Academy is usually held at the end of February. Many of the plebes' families and friends come to celebrate the plebes, and all midshipmen participate in this ceremony wearing unique uniforms.

Graduation Ceremony After four years, midshipmen graduate from school and are made new ensigns. The graduation ceremony is usually held in February, one week after the induction ceremony. At the graduation ceremony, many celebrities come, and the families of midshipmen are invited. It is one of the most significant annual events in the ROKNA.

Okpo Festival Okpo Festival is ROK Naval Academy's annual festival, usually held in May. All midshipmen have their cultural clubs, and at the Okpo Festival, midshipmen show their yearly projects. The Okpo Festival has many programs, including an ocean-science lecture, a midshipmen's night, and an Okpo night. During the Okpo Festival period, the festival and the academy are open to civilians.

== See also ==
- List of national universities in South Korea
- List of universities and colleges in South Korea
- Education in Korea
