= List of war apology statements issued by Japan =

This is a list of war apology statements issued by Japan regarding war crimes committed by the Empire of Japan during World War II. The statements were made at and after the end of World War II in Asia, from the 1950s to present day. Controversies remain to this day with some about the nature of the war crimes of the past and the appropriate person to make the apology.

== Background ==
At the end of the Pacific Theatre of World War II, the Imperial Japanese government accepted the terms of the Potsdam Declaration. In 1945, the unconditional surrender of the Empire of Japan was formally confirmed aboard the Allied battleship, USS Missouri (BB-63). Once the formal documents were signed, General Douglas MacArthur, representing the Allies, was named the Supreme Commander of the Allied Powers in Japan.

Emperor Hirohito let it be known to General MacArthur that he was prepared to apologize formally to General MacArthur for Japan's actions during World War II—including an apology for the December 7, 1941, attack on Pearl Harbour.

=== Apology rebuffed ===
In one version of the formal apology, Emperor Hirohito, the Japanese monarch, is reported to have said to General MacArthur in English: "I come before you to offer myself to the judgment of the powers you represent, as one to bear sole responsibility for every political and military decision made and action taken by my people in the conduct of the war."

In a second version of the formal apology, Patrick Lennox Tierney claims that he was an eyewitness when the Emperor came to the Allied Supreme Commander's headquarters to present this apology. Tierney was in his office on the fifth floor of the Dai-Ichi Insurance Building in Tokyo. This was the same floor where MacArthur's suite was situated. Tierney reported that when the emperor arrived, MacArthur refused to admit him or acknowledge him, and the pivotal moment passed.

Many years later, Tierney made an effort to explain his understanding of the significance of what he claimed he had personally witnessed: "Apology is a very important thing in Japan. ... It was the rudest, crudest, most uncalled for thing I have ever witnessed in my life." Whether true or not—issues which might have been addressed were allowed to remain open, and unanticipated consequences have unfolded across the decades since then.

Some in Japan have asserted that what is being demanded is that the Japanese Prime Minister or even the Emperor himself perform dogeza, in which an individual kneels and bows his head to the ground—a high form of apology in East Asian societies that Japan appears unwilling to do. Some point to an act by West German Chancellor Willy Brandt, who knelt at a monument to the Jewish victims of the Warsaw Ghetto, in 1970, as an example of a powerful and effective act of apology and reconciliation similar to dogeza.

== History ==
=== 1950s ===
- 1957: Prime Minister Kishi Nobusuke said to the people of Burma: "We view with deep regret the vexation we caused to the people of Burma in the war just passed. In a desire to atone, if only partially, for the pain suffered, Japan is prepared to meet fully and with goodwill its obligations for war reparations. The Japan of today is not the Japan of the past, but, as its Constitution indicates, is a peace-loving nation."
- 1957: Prime Minister Kishi Nobusuke said to the people of Australia: "It is my official duty, and my personal desire, to express to you and through you to the people of Australia, our heartfelt sorrow for what occurred in the war."

=== 1960s ===
- June 22, 1965: Minister of Foreign Affairs Shiina Etsusaburo said to the people of South Korea: "In our two countries' long history there have been unfortunate times, it is truly regrettable and we are deeply remorseful" (Signing of the Treaty on Basic Relations between Japan and South Korea).

=== 1970s ===
- September 29, 1972: Prime Minister Kakuei Tanaka said to the people of the People's Republic of China: "The Japanese side is keenly conscious of the responsibility for the serious damage that Japan caused in the past to the Chinese people through war, and deeply reproaches itself. Further, the Japanese side reaffirms its position that it intends to realize the normalization of relations between the two countries from the stand of fully understanding 'the three principles for the restoration of relations' put forward by the Government of the People's Republic of China. The Chinese side expresses its welcome for this" (Joint Communique of the Government of Japan and the Government of the People's Republic of China).

=== 1980s ===
- August 24, 1982: Prime Minister Zenkō Suzuki said: "I am painfully aware of Japan's responsibility for inflicting serious damages [on Asian nations] during the past war." "We need to recognize that there are criticisms that condemn [Japan's occupation] as invasion" (Press conference on the textbook controversy).
- August 26, 1982: Chief Cabinet Secretary Kiichi Miyazawa said to the people of the Republic of Korea: "I. The Japanese Government and the Japanese people are deeply aware of the fact that acts by our country in the past caused tremendous suffering and damage to the peoples of Asian countries, including the Republic of Korea (ROK) and China, and have followed the path of a pacifist state with remorse and determination that such acts must never be repeated. Japan has recognized, in the Japan-ROK Joint Communique, of 1965, that the 'past relations are regrettable, and Japan feels deep remorse,' and in the Japan-China Joint Communique, that Japan is 'keenly conscious of the responsibility for the serious damage that Japan caused in the past to the Chinese people through war and deeply reproaches itself.' These statements confirm Japan's remorse and determination which I stated above and this recognition has not changed at all to this day. 2. This spirit in the Japan-ROK Joint Communique, and the Japan-China Joint Communique, naturally should also be respected in Japan's school education and textbook authorization.
- September 6, 1984: Emperor Hirohito said to President Chun Doo Hwan: "It is indeed regrettable that there was an unfortunate past between us for a period in this century and I believe that it should not be repeated again." (Meeting with President Chun Doo Hwan.)
- September 7, 1984: Prime Minister Yasuhiro Nakasone said: "There was a period in this century when Japan brought to bear great sufferings upon your country and its people. I would like to state here that the government and people of Japan feel deep regret for this error."
- October 23, 1985: Prime Minister Yasuhiro Nakasone, in a speech to the United Nations, said: "On June 6, 1945, when the UN Charter was signed in San Francisco, Japan was still fighting a senseless war with 40 nations. Since the end of the war, Japan has profoundly regretted the unleashing of rampant ultra-nationalism and militarism and the war that brought great devastation to the people of many countries around the world and to our country as well" (Speech to the United Nations).
- 1989: Prime Minister Takeshita Noboru, in a speech in the Japanese Diet, said: "As we have made clear previously at repeated opportunities, the Japanese government and the Japanese people are deeply conscious of the fact that the actions of our country in the past caused suffering and loss to many people in neighboring countries. Starting from our regret and resolve not to repeat such things a second time, we have followed a course as a "Peace Nation" since then. This awareness and regret should be emphasized especially in the relationship between our countries and the Korean Peninsula, our nearest neighbors both geographically and historically. At this opportunity, as we face a new situation in the Korean Peninsula, again, to all peoples of the globe, concerning the relationship of the past, we want to express our deep regret and sorrow" (Speech in the Japanese Diet).

=== 1990s ===
- April 18, 1990: Minister of Foreign Affairs Taro Nakayama said to the people of South Korea: "Japan is deeply sorry for the tragedy in which these (Korean) people were moved to Sakhalin not of their own free will but by the design of the Japanese government and had to remain there after the conclusion of the war" (188th National Diet Session Lower House Committee of Foreign Affairs).
- May 24, 1990: Emperor Akihito, in a meeting with South Korean President Roh Tae Woo, said: "Reflecting upon the suffering that your people underwent during this unfortunate period, which was brought about by our nation, I cannot but feel the deepest remorse" (Meeting with President Roh Tae Woo).
- May 25, 1990: Prime Minister Toshiki Kaifu, in a meeting with President Roh Tae Woo, said: "I would like to take the opportunity here to humbly reflect upon how the people of the Korean Peninsula went through unbearable pain and sorrow as a result of our country's actions during a certain period in the past and to express that we are sorry" (Summit meeting with President Roh Tae Woo in Japan).
- January 1, 1992: Prime Minister Kiichi Miyazawa, in a press conference, said: "Concerning the comfort women, I apologize from the bottom of my heart and feel remorse for those people who suffered indescribable hardships".
- January 16, 1992: Prime Minister Kiichi Miyazawa, in a speech at dinner with President Roh Tae Woo, said: "We the Japanese people, first and foremost, have to bear in our mind the fact that your people experienced unbearable suffering and sorrow during a certain period in the past because of our nation's act, and never forget the feeling of remorse. I, as a prime minister, would like to once again express heartfelt remorse and apology to the people of your nation".
- January 17, 1992: Prime Minister Kiichi Miyazawa, at a policy speech on a visit to South Korea, said: "What we should not forget about the relationship between our nation and your nation is a fact that there was a certain period in the thousands of years of our company when we were the victimizer and you were the victim. I would like to once again express heartfelt remorse and apology for the unbearable suffering and sorrow that you experienced during this period because of our nation's act." Recently the issue of the so-called 'wartime comfort women' is being brought up. I think that incidents like this are seriously heartbreaking, and I am truly sorry".
- July 6, 1992. Chief Cabinet Secretary Koichi Kato said: "The Government again would like to express its sincere apology and remorse to all those who have suffered indescribable hardship as so-called 'wartime comfort women,' irrespective of their nationality or place of birth. With profound remorse and determination that such a mistake must never be repeated, Japan will maintain its stance as a pacifist nation and will endeavor to build up new future-oriented relations with the Republic of Korea and with other countries and regions in Asia. As I listen to many people, I feel truly grieved for this issue. By listening to the opinions of people from various directions, I would like to consider sincerely in what way we can express our feelings to those who suffered such hardship" (Statement by Chief Cabinet Secretary Koichi Kato on the Issue of the so-called "Wartime Comfort Women" from the Korean Peninsula).
- August 4, 1993: Chief Cabinet Secretary Yōhei Kōno said: "Undeniably, this was an act, with the involvement of the military authorities of the day, that severely injured the honor and dignity of many women. The Government of Japan would like to take this opportunity once again to extend its sincere apologies and remorse to all those, irrespective of place of origin, who suffered immeasurable pain and incurable physical and psychological wounds as comfort women" (Statement by the Chief Cabinet Secretary Yohei Kono on the result of the study on the issue of "comfort women"),
- August 11, 1993: Prime Minister Morihiro Hosokawa, at the first press conference after his inauguration, said: "I myself believe it was a war of aggression, a war that was wrong".
- August 23, 1993: Prime Minister Morihiro Hosokawa said in a speech at the 127th National Diet Session: "After 48 years from then, our nation has become one of nations that enjoy prosperity and peace. We must not forget that it is founded on the ultimate sacrifices in the last war, and a product of the achievements of the people of the previous generations. We would like to take this opportunity to clearly express our remorse for the past and a new determination to the world. Firstly at this occasion, we would like to express our deep remorse and apology for the fact that invasion and colonial rule by our nation in the past brought to bear great sufferings and sorrow upon many people" .
- September 24, 1993: Prime Minister Morihiro Hosokawa said, at the 128th National Diet Session: "I used the expression war of aggression and act of aggression to express honestly my recognition which is the same as the one that the act of our nation in the past brought to bear unbearable sufferings and sorrow upon many people, and to express once again deep remorse and apology".
- August 31, 1994: Prime Minister Tomiichi Murayama said in a speech: "Japan's actions in a certain period of the past not only claimed numerous victims here in Japan but also left the peoples of neighboring Asia and elsewhere with scars that are painful even today. I am thus taking this opportunity to state my belief, based on my profound remorse for these acts of aggression, colonial rule, and the like that caused such unbearable suffering and sorrow for so many people, that Japan's future path should be one of making every effort to build world peace in line with my no-war commitment. It is imperative for us Japanese to look squarely to our history with the peoples of neighboring Asia and elsewhere. Only with a solid basis of mutual understanding and confidence that can be built through overcoming the pain on both sides, can we and the peoples of neighboring countries together clear up the future of Asia-Pacific.... On the issue of wartime 'comfort women,' which seriously stained the honor and dignity of many women, I would like to take this opportunity once again to express my profound and sincere remorse and apologies. With regard to this issue as well, I believe that one way of demonstrating such feelings of apologies and remorse is to work to further promote mutual understanding with the countries and areas concerned as well as to face squarely to the past and ensure that it is rightly conveyed to future generations. This initiative, in this sense, has been drawn up consistent with such belief" (Statement by Prime Minister Tomiichi Murayama on the "Peace, Friendship, and Exchange Initiative").
- June 9, 1995: House of Representatives, National Diet of Japan passed a resolution stating: "On the occasion of the 50th anniversary of the end of World War II, this House offers its sincere condolences to those who fell in action and victims of wars and similar actions all over the world. Solemnly reflecting upon many instances of colonial rule and acts of aggression in the modern history of the world, and recognizing that Japan carried out those acts in the past, inflicting pain and suffering upon the peoples of other countries, especially in Asia, the Members of this House express a sense of deep remorse" (Resolution to renew the determination for peace on the basis of lessons learned from history).
- July 1995: Prime Minister Tomiichi Murayama said in a statement: "The problem of the so-called wartime comfort women is one such scar, which, with the involvement of the Japanese military forces of the time, seriously stained the honor and dignity of many women. This is entirely inexcusable. I offer my profound apology to all those who, as wartime comfort women, suffered emotional and physical wounds that can never be closed" (Statement by Prime Minister Tomiichi Murayama on the occasion of the establishment of the "Asian Women's Fund").
- August 15, 1995: Prime Minister Tomiichi Murayama said in a statement: "During a certain period in the not-too-distant past, Japan, through its colonial rule and aggression, caused tremendous damage and suffering to the people of many countries, particularly those of Asia. In the hope that no such mistake will be made in the future, I regard, in a spirit of humanity, these irrefutable facts of history, and express here once again my feelings of deep remorse and state my heartfelt apology" (Statement by Prime Minister Tomiichi Murayama 'On the occasion of the 50th anniversary of the war's end').
- June 23, 1996: Prime Minister Ryutaro Hashimoto said in a press conference: "Hashimoto mentioned the aspects of Japan's colonial rule of the Korean Peninsula such as the forced Japanization of Korean people's name and commented "It is beyond imagination how this injured the hearts of Korean people". Hashimoto also touched on the issue of Korean comfort women and said "Nothing injured the honor and dignity of women more than this and I would like to extend words of deep remorse and the heartfelt apology" (Joint press conference at a summit meeting with President Kim Young Sam in South Korea).
- October 8, 1996: Emperor Akihito said in a speech at a dinner with the South Korean president, Kim Dae Jung: "There was a period when our nation brought to bear great sufferings upon the people of the Korean Peninsula." "The deep sorrow that I feel over this will never be forgotten".
- January 13, 1998: Press Secretary published: "Statement by Prime Minister Ryutaro Hashimoto on World War II prisoners of war. Q: At the meeting last night with Prime Minister Blair, did Prime Minister Hashimoto really apologize for the prisoners of war? Spokesman Hashimoto: Japan has never apologised. This was the second meeting between Prime Minister Hashimoto and Prime Minister Blair and we considered the meeting very important, especially this year. Making use of this opportunity, Prime Minister Hashimoto expressed his remorse and apology on behalf of the Government of Japan; this is very important. Prime Minister Blair fully understands the importance of the statement made by Prime Minister Hashimoto on this issue. His press opportunities after the talks objectively reflect what the two gentlemen talked about" (Press Conference by the Press Secretary). In a follow-up interview, spokesman Tanaka for Prime Minister Hashimoto clarified that "Our sense of apology and our sense of remorse was addressed to all the countries which have gone through the experiences of the last world war."
- July 15, 1998: Prime Minister Ryutaro Hashimoto, in a letter to the Netherlands Prime Minister Willem Kok: "The Government of Japan, painfully aware of its moral responsibility concerning the issue of so-called "wartime comfort women," has been sincerely addressing this issue in close cooperation with the Asian Women's Fund which implements the projects to express the national atonement on this issue. Recognizing that the issue of comfort women, with the involvement of the Japanese military authorities at that time, was a grave affront to the honor and dignity of large numbers of women, I would like to convey to Your Excellency my most sincere apologies and remorse to all the women who underwent immeasurable and painful experiences and suffered incurable physical and psychological wounds as comfort women... By the Statement of the Prime Minister in 1995, the Government of Japan renewed the feelings of deep remorse and the heartfelt apology for tremendous damage and suffering caused by Japan to the people of many countries including the Netherlands during a certain period in the past. My cabinet has not modified this position at all, and I myself laid a wreath to the Indisch Monument with these feelings on the occasion of my visit to the Netherlands in June last year" (The contents of the letter of the then Japanese Prime Minister Ryutaro Hashimoto sent to ).
- October 8, 1998: Prime Minister Keizō Obuchi said in a declaration: "Looking back on the relations between Japan and the Republic of Korea during this century, Prime Minister Obuchi regarded in a spirit of humility the fact of history that Japan caused, during a certain period in the past, tremendous damage and suffering to the people of the Republic of Korea through its colonial rule, and expressed his deep remorse and heartfelt apology for this fact. President Kim accepted with sincerity this statement of Prime Minister Obuchi's recognition of history and expressed his appreciation for it. He also expressed his view that the present calls upon both countries to overcome their unfortunate history and to build a future-oriented relationship based on reconciliation as well as good-neighborly and friendly cooperation" (Japan-South Korea Joint Declaration A New Japan-South Korea Partnership towards the Twenty-first Century).
- November 26, 1998: Prime Minister Keizō Obuchi said in a declaration: "Both sides believe that squarely facing the past and correctly understanding history are the important foundation for further developing relations between Japan and China. The Japanese side observes the 1972 Joint Communique of the Government of Japan and the Government of the People's Republic of China and the August 15, 1995, Statement by former Prime Minister Tomiichi Murayama. The Japanese side is keenly conscious of the responsibility for the serious distress and damage that Japan caused to the Chinese people through its aggression against China during a certain period in the past and expressed deep remorse for this. The Chinese side hopes that the Japanese side will learn lessons from history and adhere to the path of peace and development. Based on this, both sides will develop long-standing relations of friendship" (Japan-China Joint Declaration On Building a Partnership of Friendship and Cooperation for Peace and Development).

=== 2000s ===
- August 10, 2000: Consul-General of Japan in Hong Kong Itaru Umezu said: "In fact, Japan has clearly and repeatedly expressed its sincere remorse and apologies, and has dealt sincerely with reparation issues. These apologies were irrefutably expressed, in particular in Prime Minister Tomiichi Murayama's official statement in 1995, which was based on a cabinet decision and which has subsequently been upheld by successive prime ministers, including Prime Minister Yoshirō Mori. Mr. Murayama said that Japan 'through its colonial rule and aggression, caused tremendous damage and suffering to the people of many countries, particularly to those of Asian nations. In the hope that no such mistake be made in the future, I regard, in a spirit of humility, these irrefutable facts of history, and express here once again my feelings of deep remorse and state my heartfelt apology'" (Japan Has Faced Its Past. Far Eastern Economic Review, August 10, 2000).
- August 30, 2000: Minister for Foreign Affairs Yōhei Kōno said in an address during his visit to the People's Republic of China: "I believe that Japan's perception of history was clearly set out in the Statement by Prime Minister Tomiichi Murayama issued, following a Cabinet Decision, on the fiftieth anniversary of the end of World War II. As a member of the Cabinet, I participated in the drafting of that Statement. The spirit contained therein has been carried forth by successive administrations and is now the common view of a large number of Japanese people" (Address by Minister for Foreign Affairs Yōhei Kōno During His Visit to the People's Republic of China).
- April 3, 2001: Chief Cabinet Secretary Yasuo Fukuda said: "Japan humbly accepts that for a period in the not too distant past, it caused tremendous damage and suffering to the people of many countries, particularly to those of Asian nations, through its colonial rule and aggression, and expresses its deep remorse and heartfelt apology for this. Such recognition has been succeeded by subsequent Cabinets and there is no change regarding this point in the present Cabinet" (Comments by the Chief Cabinet Secretary, Yasuo Fukuda on the history textbooks to be used in junior high schools from 2002).
- September 8, 2001: Minister for Foreign Affairs Makiko Tanaka said in a speech: "We have never forgotten that Japan caused tremendous damage and suffering to the people of many countries during the last war. Many lost their precious lives and many were wounded. The war has left an incurable scar on many people, including former prisoners of war. Facing these facts of history in a spirit of humility, I reaffirm today our feelings of deep remorse and heartfelt apology expressed in the Prime Minister Murayama's statement of 1995" (Speech by Minister for Foreign Affairs Makiko Tanaka at the Ceremony in Commemoration of 50th anniversary of the Signing of the San Francisco Peace Treaty).
- October 15, 2001: Prime Minister Junichiro Koizumi said: "During the talks, President Kim highly appreciated the words of Prime Minister Koizumi at Sodaemun Independence Park, in which he expressed remorse and apology for Japan's colonial domination" (Japanese prime minister visits South Korea).
- 2001: Prime Minister Junichiro Koizumi (Also signed by all the prime ministers since 1995, including Ryutaro Hashimoto, Keizō Obuchi, Yoshirō Mori) said in a letter: "As Prime Minister of Japan, I thus extend anew my most sincere apologies and remorse to all the women who underwent immeasurable and painful experiences and suffered incurable physical and psychological wounds as comfort women. We must not evade the weight of the past, nor should we evade our responsibilities for the future. I believe that our country, painfully aware of its moral responsibilities, with feelings of apology and remorse, should face up squarely to its past history and accurately convey it to future generations" (Letter from Prime Minister Junichiro Koizumi to the former comfort women).
- September 17, 2002: Prime Minister Junichiro Koizumi said: "The Japanese side regards, in a spirit of humility, the facts of history that Japan caused tremendous damage and suffering to the people of Korea through its colonial rule in the past, and expressed deep remorse and heartfelt apology" (Japan-DPRK Pyongyang Declaration).
- August 15, 2003: Prime Minister Junichiro Koizumi said: "During the war, Japan caused tremendous damage and suffering to the people of many countries, particularly to those of Asian nations. On behalf of the people of Japan, I hereby renew my feelings of profound remorse as I express my sincere mourning to the victims" (Address by Prime Minister Junichiro Koizumi at the 58th Memorial Ceremony for the War Dead).
- April 22, 2005: Prime Minister Junichiro Koizumi said: "Japan squarely faces these facts of history in a spirit of humility. And with feelings of deep remorse and heartfelt apology always engraved in mind, Japan has resolutely maintained, consistently since the end of World War II, never turning into a military power but an economic power, its principle of resolving all matters by peaceful means, without recourse to using of force. Japan once again states its resolve to contribute to the peace and prosperity of the world in the future as well, prizing the relationship of trust it enjoys with the nations of the world." (Address by the Prime Minister of Japan at the Asia-African Summit 2005).
- August 15, 2005: Prime Minister Junichiro Koizumi said: "In the past, Japan, through its colonial rule and aggression, caused tremendous damage and suffering to the people of many countries, particularly to those of Asian nations. Sincerely facing these facts of history, I once again express my feelings of deep remorse and heartfelt apology and also express the feelings of mourning for all victims, both at home and abroad, in the war. I am determined not to allow the lessons of that horrible war to erode, and to contribute to the peace and prosperity of the world without ever again waging a war."
- March 1, 2007: Prime Minister Shinzō Abe stated in a newspaper article that there was no evidence that the Japanese government had kept sex slaves, even though the Japanese government had already admitted the use of brothels in 1993. On March 27, the Japanese parliament issued an official apology. This was regarding the surviving comfort women who had demanded an apology from the Japanese government for being used as sex slaves.
- May 9, 2009: The Japanese government, through its ambassador in the U.S., apologized to former American prisoners of war who suffered in the Bataan Death March.

=== 2010s ===
- February 11, 2010: Foreign Minister Katsuya Okada said: "I believe what happened 100 years ago deprived Koreans of their country and national pride. I can understand the feelings of the people who lost their country and had their pride wounded," Okada said during a joint news conference with South Korean Foreign Minister Yu Myung-hwan. (This was a statement marking the 100th anniversary of Japan's colonial annexation of Korea, and not in reference to Japan's war acts in particular.)
- August 10, 2010: Prime Minister Naoto Kan expressed "deep regret over the suffering inflicted" during the Empire of Japan's colonial rule over Korea. Japan's Kyodo News also reported that Cabinet members endorsed the statement. In addition, Kan said that Japan will hand over precious cultural artifacts that South Korea has been demanding. Among them were records of an ancient Korean royal dynasty.
- September 13, 2010: Foreign Minister Katsuya Okada apologized to a group of six former American soldiers who during World War II were held as prisoners of war by the Japanese, including 90-year-old Lester Tenney, a survivor of the Bataan Death March in 1942. The six and their families and the families of two deceased soldiers were invited to visit Japan at the expense of the Japanese government in a program that will see more American former prisoners of war and former prisoners of war from other countries visit Japan in the future.
- December 7, 2010: Prime Minister Naoto Kan apologized for Korea's suffering under colonization as part of a statement marking the 100th anniversary of the annexation in 1910. "I express a renewed feeling of deep remorse and state my heartfelt apology for the tremendous damage and suffering caused by colonial rule," Kan said. Kan said Japan colonized Korea "against the will of the Korean people" who suffered great damage to their national pride and loss of culture and sovereignty as a result and added that he wants to take an honest look at his country's past with the courage and humility to address its history.
- March 3, 2011: Foreign Minister Seiji Maehara apologized to a group of Australian POWs visiting Japan as guests of the Government of Japan for the ill-treatment they received while in Imperial Japanese captivity.
- December 8, 2011: Parliamentary Vice Minister for Foreign Affairs Toshiyuki Kat apologized to Canada for their treatment of Canadian POW's after the Battle of Hong Kong.
- November 13, 2013: Former Japanese Prime Minister Hatoyama Yukio offered personal apology for Japan's wartime crimes, especially the Nanjing Massacre, "As a Japanese citizen, I feel that it's my duty to apologize for even just one Chinese civilian killed brutally by Japanese soldiers and that such action cannot be excused by saying that it occurred during the war."
- April 9, 2014: Japanese Ambassador to the Philippines Toshinao Urabe expressed "heartfelt apology" and "deep remorse" and vowed "never to wage war again" at the Day of Valor ceremony in Bataan.
- April 29, 2015: Prime Minister Shinzō Abe, during the first speech of a Japanese prime minister at a Joint session of the United States Congress, stated "deep repentance" for Japan's actions during World War II.
- August 14, 2015: The 70th anniversary of the end of the war statement by the Abe cabinet noted, "We must not let our children, grandchildren, and even further generations to come, who have nothing to do with that war, be predestined to apologize".
- December 28, 2015: Japanese Foreign Minister Fumio Kishida and South Korean Foreign Minister Yun Byung-se announced at a joint press conference, which consisted of their respective statements on behalf of Japan and South Korea. Kishida stated, "The issue of comfort women, with involvement of the Japanese military authorities at that time, was a grave affront to the honor and dignity of large numbers of women, and the Government of Japan is painfully aware of responsibilities from this perspective. As Prime Minister of Japan, Prime Minister Abe expresses anew his most sincere apologies and remorse to all the women who underwent immeasurable and painful experiences and suffered incurable physical and psychological wounds as comfort women." The statement went on to explain that "the Government of Japan will now take measures to heal psychological wounds of all former comfort women through its budget" and that it had been decided that the South Korean government would "establish a foundation for the purpose of providing support for the former comfort women". In return, Yun stated that his government "acknowledges the fact that the Government of Japan is concerned about the statue built in front of the Embassy of Japan in Seoul from the viewpoint of preventing any disturbance of the peace of the mission or impairment of its dignity, and will strive to solve this issue in an appropriate manner". Both stated that this agreement will "finally and irreversibly" resolve the contentious issue and that "on the premise that the Government of Japan will steadily implement the measures it announced", both countries "will refrain from accusing or criticizing each other regarding this issue in the international community, including at the United Nations".

=== 2020s ===
- August 15, 2020: At a memorial ceremony to mark the 75th anniversary of the end of World War II and the war dead, Emperor Naruhito expressed "deep remorse" over Japan's wartime past and he stated "I earnestly hope that the ravages of war will never again be repeated".
- July 11, 2024: Following the Second Japan-Philippines Foreign and Defense Ministerial Meeting ("2+2"), Japan Ministry of Foreign Affairs deputy press secretary Kaneko Mariko said Japan settled all its obligations in the 1951 Treaty of San Francisco and apologized with remorse. However, again, it announced to take many measures to recover the honor of Filipino Comfort Women.

== Comments clarifying past apologies ==
- September 6, 1997: Prime Minister Ryutaro Hashimoto said: "In 1995, on the 50th anniversary of the end of World War II, the Government of Japan expressed its resolution through the statement by the Prime Minister, which states that during a certain period in the past, Japan's conduct caused tremendous damage and suffering to the people of many countries, including China, and the Prime Minister expressed his feeling of deep remorse and stated his heartfelt apology while giving his word to make efforts for peace. I was one of the ministers who was involved in drafting this statement. I would like to repeat that this is the official position of the Government of Japan. During the summit meeting that I had during my visit to China, I have made this point very clear in a frank manner to the Chinese side. Premier Li Peng said that he concurs completely with my remarks" (Ministry of Foreign Affairs Press Conference on: Visit of Prime Minister Ryutaro Hashimoto to the People's Republic of China).
- Letter from Prime Minister Junichiro Koizumi to the former comfort women:
  The Year of 2001
  Dear Madam,
  On the occasion that the Asian Women's Fund, in cooperation with the Government and the people of Japan, offers atonement from the Japanese people to the former wartime comfort women, I wish to express my feelings as well.
  The issue of comfort women, with the involvement of the Japanese military authorities at that time, was a grave affront to the honor and dignity of large numbers of women.
  As Prime Minister of Japan, I thus extend anew my most sincere apologies and remorse to all the women who underwent immeasurable and painful experiences and suffered incurable physical and psychological wounds as comfort women.
  We must not evade the weight of the past, nor should we evade our responsibilities for the future.
  I believe that our country, painfully aware of its moral responsibilities, with feelings of apology and remorse, should face up squarely to its past history and accurately convey it to future generations.
  Furthermore, Japan also should take an active part in dealing with violence and other forms of injustice to the honor and dignity of women.
  Finally, I pray from the bottom of my heart that each of you will find peace for the rest of your lives.
  Respectfully yours,
  Junichiro Koizumi
  Prime Minister of Japan
- October 18, 2013: Prime Minister Shinzō Abe said: "Japan inflicted tremendous damage and suffering on people in many countries, especially in Asia. The Abe Cabinet will take the same stance as that of past Cabinets."

== Controversy ==
Demands for an apology and compensation have been a recurring topic in Korean, Taiwanese-Chinese, and mainland Chinese politics. Western nations are also demanding long-overdue actions from the Japanese government, most notably through the United States House of Representatives House Resolution 121 voted in 2007. Criticisms regarding the degree and formality of apology, issued as a statement or delivered person-to-person to the country addressed, and the perception by some that some apologies are later retracted or contradicted by statements or actions of Japan, among others.

In October 2006, Prime Minister Shinzō Abe's apology was followed on the same day by a visit of a group of 80 Japanese lawmakers to the Yasukuni Shrine which enshrines more than 1,000 convicted war criminals. Two years after the apology, Shinzo Abe also denied that the Imperial Japanese military had forced comfort women into sexual slavery during World War II. He also cast doubt on Murayama's apology by saying, "The Abe Cabinet is not necessarily keeping to it" and by questioning the definition used in the apology by saying, "There is no definitive answer either in academia or in the international community on what constitutes aggression. Things that happen between countries appear different depending on which side you're looking from."

As of 2010, 24% of South Koreans still believe that Japan has never apologized for its colonial rule, while another 58% believe Japan has not apologized sufficiently.

Some in the Japanese government have expressed exasperation at what level of apology is enough. During an impending visit in 1990 to Japan by South Korean president Roh Tae Woo Japanese cabinet secretary Ozawa Ichiro reportedly said, "it is because we have reflected on the past that we cooperate with [South] Korea economically. Is it really necessary to grovel on our hands and knees and prostrate ourselves any more than we already have?"

In 2013, some right-wing nationalists of Japan accused South Korea of hypocrisy, because in their view Japan had apologized and provided compensation for the sexual slavery it perpetrated during World War II yet South Korea has yet to address the Lai Đại Hàn, reported "sexual slavery" South Korea perpetrated during the Vietnam War. However, South Korea's government claimed South Korea–Vietnam relations have "improved" since 1992. This is due to several "apologetic" statements from past presidents of South Korea, as well as the creation of the "Pieta statue" from South Korean non-governmental organizations. Although none of these measures have been given any recognition by Vietnamese officials that the issue is over.

At the end of 2015, in response to the joint announcement by Japanese Foreign Minister Fumio Kishida and South Korean Foreign Minister Yun Byung-se to "finally and irreversibly" resolve the "comfort women" issue, some of the 46 remaining survivors expressed their discontent over the agreement. "It seems neither government cares about the victims. I don't count what they have agreed today. What we want is not monetary compensation but a legal one. We don’t want money. Those who commit crimes must take official, legal responsibility. I will fight until the day I die," said survivor Lee Yong-soo. However, survivor Yu Hee-Nam said, "I know the government has made efforts to resolve the issue within this year, so I’ll follow their decision." But she also said the agreement was not satisfactory. "Money is not the issue. We've lived without human rights."

In August 2025, it was reported that Prime Minister Shigeru Ishiba will not express his views on the 80th anniversary of the end of the WWII on 15 August, and that he has decided not to issue a prime minister's statement which requires a Cabinet meeting approval.

=== Forms of apology ===
Washington Coalition for Comfort Women Issues also rebuffed the use of the word owabi (お詫び) rather than shazai (謝罪) in Japanese apologies. The coalition said that the expression "in most cases means a sense of apology slightly weightier than 'Excuse me' [in English]".

In a paper published by Jeffrey Mok and Mitsuhiro Tokunaga, this is attributed to a mistranslation and misunderstanding of the word owabi. "The use of owabi was clearly appropriate in its formality and degree of imposition. Both the authoritative dictionaries from Beijing Waiguoyu Xuexiao Japanese-Chinese Dictionary and Iwanami Japanese-Chinese Dictionary categorized owabi as a formal and weighty apologetic word. It was also commonly used as an official and formal way of apology and carried the same degree of regret as other formal forms of apologetic words such as shazai, shinsha and chinsha (陳謝). It was also noted that the use of shazai was limited to print and was rare. Both owabi and chinsha were commonly used as an official and formal apologetic expressions and neither was considered weaker than the other."

The Japanese government and Prime Ministers have used the expression "kokoro kara no owabi" (心からのお詫び) that most closely translates in English to "from our heart, most sincere apologies" about this issue.

== See also ==
- Japanese history textbook controversies § Comfort women comments
- Asian Women's Fund
- Fusen Ketsugi
- Japanese dissidence during the early Shōwa period
- Japanese invasion money
