= Comfort Women Memorial Peace Garden =

Memorial dedicated to comfort women

Comfort Women Memorial Peace Garden is a memorial to the World War II comfort women, which is located at the Fairfax County Government Center in Fairfax County, Virginia.

== Ceremonies ==
=== Unveiling ceremony ===
The unveiling ceremony was on May 30, 2014. After the ribbon-cutting ceremony, butterflies, representing the comfort women, were released into the sky to honor the comfort women. There was also a dance performance to honor the comfort women. Park Jeong-sook, director of the Peace Mission Dance Group, performed a dance at the unveiling ceremony.

Kang Il-chul, a former comfort woman, visited for the unveiling ceremony. Kang touched the Memorial during the unveiling ceremony. Kang said, "I thank Americans who love Koreans and my fellow Koreans. The Japanese government should make an apology immediately, and the Korean government should address the issue more aggressively."

=== First anniversary ===
The first anniversary was on May 21, 2015. During the first anniversary, the Peace Mission Korean Dance Group, directed by Park Jeong-sook, performed.

Chung In-sook, who attended the first anniversary, said, "I was in the fifth grade during the Japanese occupation, and the teacher came to class and said one person was needed to work in a factory in Japan." Chung said, "We were told we would receive some form of compensation. One girl volunteered, she was 12 or 13, and never came back."

== Creation ==
The Memorial was a collaboration between the Washington Coalition for Comfort Women Issues, Inc., and Fairfax County, led by Sharon Bulova, Chairman of the Fairfax County Board of Supervisors.

The Memorial was unveiled after a campaign and fundraising by Korean American activists. A group of Korean Americans led the project to establish the Memorial.

== Purpose ==
The Fairfax County Board of Supervisors said that the Memorial "will serve as a lasting reminder and an affirmation to the world that all crimes against humanity, such as human trafficking, will not be condoned or tolerated." Sharon Bulova, Fairfax County Board of Supervisors Chairman, said, "Human trafficking is a serious issue on all corners of the globe, including right here in the United States and in Fairfax County." Bulova said, "The purpose of this memorial is to commemorate the Comfort Women of World War II and draw attention to the broader issue of human trafficking occurring all over the world."
