= Japan–South Korea Joint Declaration of 1998 =

The New Japan–Republic of Korea Partnership towards the Twenty-first Century (Japanese: 日韓共同宣言 – 21世紀に向けた新たな日韓パートナーシップ, Korean: 한일공동선언 - 21세기를 향한 새로운 한일파트너쉽) was a declaration made on October 8, 1998, between Japanese Prime Minister Keizō Obuchi and South Korean President Kim Dae-jung to reconfirm friendly relations between Japan and South Korea, as well as declare that both countries will discuss the future of Japan-South Korea relations in order to build a new Japan–South Korea partnership. This declaration is also called the Japan–South Korea Joint Declaration of 1998.

== Background ==
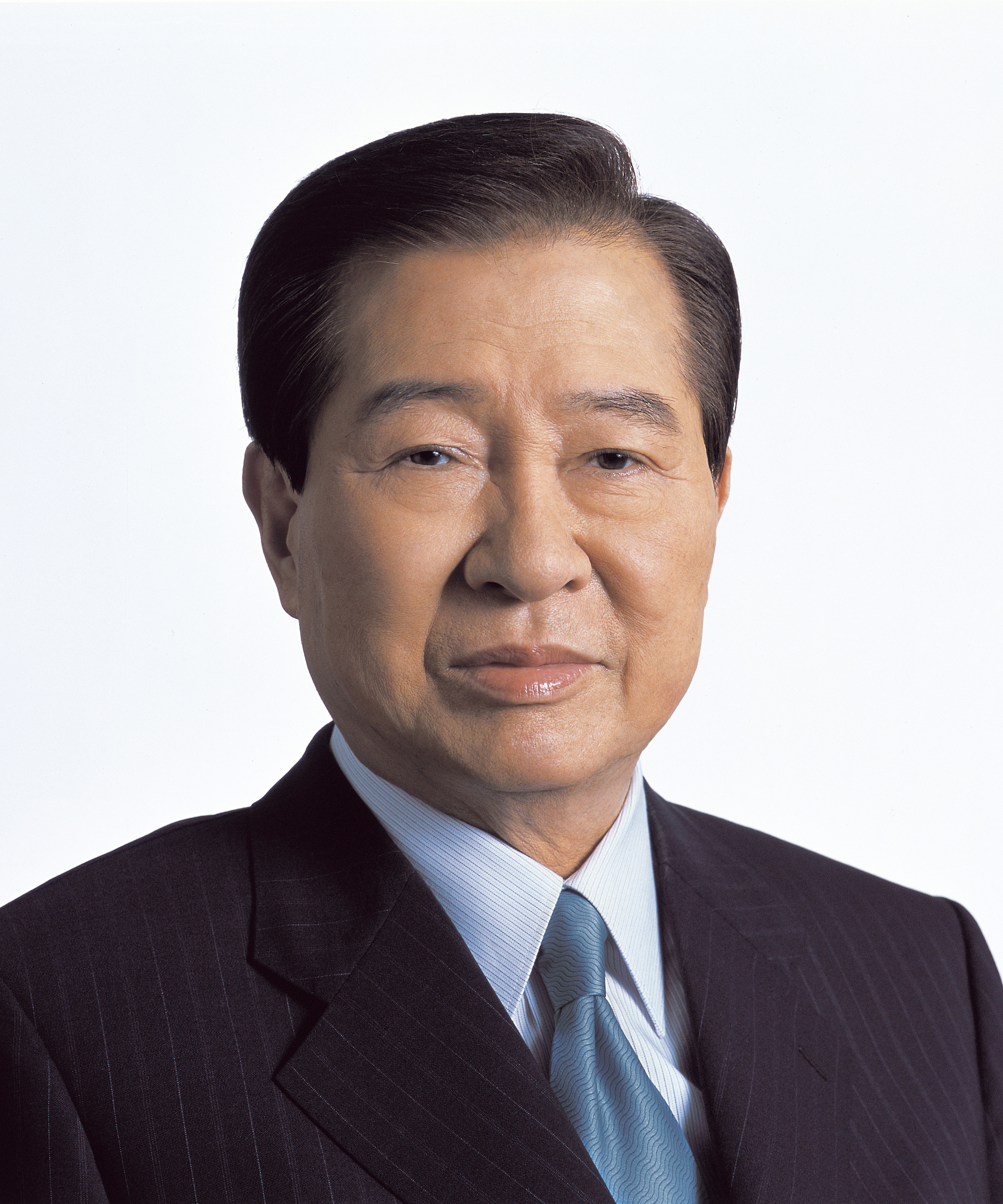
ROK President Kim Dae-Jung

=== Immediate background ===
In February 1998, when Kim Dae-jung became the president of South Korea, Japan-South Korea relations were at its worst. With both countries unable to come to an agreement about issues such as the Dokdo/Takeshima, comfort women, and fishing, relations between the two countries continued to worsen. Kim Dae-jung, unlike the former president Kim Young-Sam, who was very critical about the Japanese government, actively sought to have talks with Japan and set about preparing the Japan–South Korea Joint Declaration of 1998 along with Japan.

=== Historical background ===
An existing treaty between South Korea and Japan, the Treaty on Basic Relations between Japan and the Republic of Korea, was signed on June 22, 1965, and provided basic diplomatic relations for the two states. In this treaty, signed by Japanese PM Eisaku Satō and the South Korean dictator Park Chung Hee, Japan and South Korea agreed upon settling problems with property during war-time, individual claims for compensation, and economic cooperation. Japan provided South Korea with $800 million, which would settle any issues about Imperial-era property and compensation for individuals.

On July 6, 1992, Chief Cabinet Secretary Koichi Kato made an apology towards South Korea and to the wartime comfort women. Kato touched upon the remorse that Japan feels, along with hopes to build “future-oriented” relations with South Korea. The "Murayama Statement", also called "On the occasion of the 50th anniversary of the war's end", was a statement released on August 16, 1995, by Prime Minister Tomiichi Murayama. This statement was mainly an apology regarding the damages that Japan caused to its neighboring countries during World War II. Similarly, on June 23, 1996, Prime Minister Ryutaro Hashimoto apologized about comfort women and announced that he and President Kim Young-sam had agreed that friendly relations between Japan and South Korea was ideal for not just in Asia, but also globally.

== Details of the Agreement ==
Prior to agreeing to the Japan-South Korea Joint Declaration, in 1965, Although the two countries had signed the Treaty on Basic Relations between Japan and the Republic of Korea in 1965, the two leaders agreed to pursue the further development of their relations as neighbors. The Joint Declaration resulted in the following agreements.

=== Japan–South Korea Relations ===
- Cooperate between the peoples of Japan and South Korea for the success of the 2002 Soccer World Cup and to use the occasion of this event to further promote cultural and sports exchanges.
- Recognize that Korean nationals residing in Japan could serve as a bridge for mutual exchanges and understanding between the peoples of Japan and South Korea as well as with continue the determinations of enhancing their social status.
- Enhance the governmental programs for the exchange of students and youths including the introduction of such programs for junior and senior high school students, and that both governments would introduce a working holiday program for youths of both countries from April 1999.
- President Kim Dae-jung conveyed his policy of opening South Korea to Japanese cultural imports (music, anime, manga, movies, television shows, books, etc.).
- Commence talks on concluding a Japan–South Korea Extradition Treaty and further strengthen cooperation on countermeasures against international organized crime such as on illicit narcotics and stimulants.
- Maintain and strengthen the mutual visits and the close consultations between them, to conduct these visits and consultations regularly and to further enhance Minister-level consultations in various areas, in particular those between their Foreign Ministers.

=== Economy ===
- Strengthen bilateral economic policy consultations as well as to further promote policy coordination between the two countries at such multilateral fora as the World Trade Organization (WTO), the Organization for Economic Co-operation and Development (OECD), and the Asia-Pacific Economic Cooperation (APEC).
- President Kim appreciated the economic assistance to South Korea from Japan in the past in a wide range of areas including finance, investment and technological transfer, and explained the efforts of South Korea to resolve its economic problems.
- PM Obuchi expressed Japan's intention to continue support for the efforts being made by South Korea to overcome its economic difficulties.
- Reached a basic agreement was reached on loans from the Export-Import Bank of Japan to South Korea which properly utilizes the fiscal investment and loan program.

=== Fishing ===
- Welcomed the negotiations on the new Japan–South Korea fisheries agreement, which had been a major outstanding issue between the two countries, had reached basic agreement, and expressed the hope that under the new fishing order based on the United Nations Convention on the Law of the Sea, relations between Japan and South Korea in the area of fisheries would develop smoothly.

=== International Relations ===
- Shared the view that the role of the United Nations should be strengthened in order to respond more effectively to the challenges and tasks in the twenty-first century and that this could be achieved through strengthening the functions of the Security Council, increasing the efficiency of the United Nations Secretariat, ensuring a stable financial base, strengthening United Nations peace-keeping operations, cooperation for economic and social development in developing countries and other means.
- Emphasized that all kinds of weapons of mass destruction and their proliferation posed a threat to the peace and security of the international community, and decided to further strengthen cooperation between Japan and South Korea in this field.

=== Problems regarding North Korea ===
- In order to achieve peace and stability on the Korean Peninsula, it was extremely important North Korea pursue reform and openness and take through dialogue a more constructive attitude. PM Obuchi expressed support for the policies of President Kim Dae-jung Regarding North Korea.
- Confirmed the importance of maintaining the Agreed Framework signed in October 1994 between the United States of America and North Korea and the Korean Peninsula Energy Development Organization (KEDO) as the most realistic and effective mechanisms for preventing North Korea from advancing its nuclear program.
- Reaffirmed that if the North Korea's missile development is left unchecked, it would adversely affect the peace and security of Japan, South Korea, and of the entire Northeast Asian region.
- Shared the view that the implementation of the Agreement of Reconciliation, Non-aggression, Exchanges and Cooperation between the South and North, which entered into force in February 1992, and the smooth progress of the Four-Party Talks are desirable.

=== Environmental Problems ===
- Promote Japan-South Korea environmental policy dialogue in order to strengthen their cooperation on various issues concerning the global environment, such as reducing greenhouse gas emissions and countermeasures against acid rain.

== Outcomes ==
=== South Korea seeks destruction of Declaration in 2001 ===
On July 18, 2001, the National Assembly of the Republic of Korea made a resolution unanimously seeking the destruction of the Japan–South Korea Joint Declaration of 1998. This resolution was the result of anti-Japanese emotions that were caused by then-Prime Minister Junichiro Koizumi visiting Yasukuni Shrine, along with Japanese history textbooks omitting details about facts related to issues such as Imperial Japanese war crimes and comfort women in the same year. When no action was taken by Japan to “correct” their textbooks, South Korea temporarily halted allowing Japanese cultural capital from coming into the country, which has been happening over five steps since the 1998 Joint Declaration. However, this did not result in the destruction of the 1998 Joint Declaration, after talks between then-President Roh Moo Hyun and then-Prime Minister Koizumi. The 4th step of allowing Japanese cultural imports into South Korea, which was temporarily stopped on July 12, 2001, resumed on January 1, 2004.

=== Commemoration ===
On October 9, 2018, the Commemorative Symposium for the 20th Anniversary of the Japan-South Korea Joint Declaration was held in Tokyo. This symposium was a way to celebrate the 20th anniversary of Japan and South Korea signing the Joint Declaration in 1998, and effectively also an opportunity for Prime Minister Abe to talk about current Japan-South Korea relations. Abe emphasizes that the efforts from people like the past-Prime Minister Obuchi and past-President Kim Dae-jung have allowed the two countries to overcome obstacles regarding Japan-South Korea relations. Throughout his speech, Abe continuously uses the phrase “future-oriented”, emphasizing his enthusiasm towards improving relations between the two countries.

== Stances on History ==
=== Japan ===
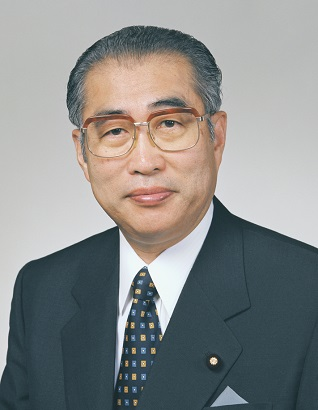
Japanese PM Keizō Obuchi

The Japanese government's recognition towards historical issues such as the comfort women issue, war-time laborer issue, has been acknowledged in the “Murayama Statement” which was released on August 15, 1995, to apologize for the Japanese acts conducted in the Asia-Pacific region during the World War II. The following prime ministers has issued similar statements, including the “Koizumi Statement” on August 15, 2005, and “Abe Statement” made on August 14, 2015. In the Japan–South Korea Joint Declaration of 1998, Prime Minister Obuchi made his feelings of remorse and apology clear, as to all the damage and suffering that had been done during Japan's colonial rule.

In terms of the comfort women issue, the Japanese Ministry of Foreign Affairs have mentioned the following:

The government recognizes and apologizes to all those women known as comfort women who suffered immeasurable pain and incurable physical and psychological wounds.

The government of Japan has legally settled all issues of reparations, properties and claims arising from the war, and has extended maximum cooperation to the Asian Women's Fund which implemented “medical and welfare support projects” and provided “atonement money” to offer realistic relief to comfort women who are now advanced in years (the Asian Women's Fund has been disbanded in March 2007).

The Abe Statement made on August 14, 2015, states that “we must never forget that there were women behind the battlefields whose honor and dignity were severely injured. It is also stated that we will engrave in our hearts the past, when the dignity and honor of many women were severely injured during wars in the 20th century, and Japan will lead the world in making the 21st century an era in which women’s human rights are not infringed upon.

Japan and South Korea reached an agreement on December 28, 2015 in Seoul where the two Foreign Ministers reached an agreement regarding the issue of comfort women and confirmed that the issue is resolved “finally and irreversibly”.

=== Republic of Korea ===
In the Joint Declaration, President Kim expressed his feelings of appreciation for PM Obuchi's attitude. He also suggested to build a future-oriented relationship, and to move forward with the historical issue.

However, the current South Korean government has been skeptical of the Japanese government's attitude towards the historical issues which had occurred in World War II, as not to scar relations. especially regarding the comfort women issue and the war-time laborers issue.

ROK President Moon Jae-in has criticized the bilateral agreement of 2015 which was signed between Japan and South Korea and has brought it upon the Republic of Korea's Constitutional Court on the validity of this diplomatic agreement. However, on December 27, 2019, the Republic of Korea Constitutional Court declined to rule on the validity of the 2015 agreement made between the two nations, and has concluded that the agreement does not infringe upon the constitution of either countries.

== Issues raised by the Agreement ==
During the meeting that concluded in the Joint Declaration between Japan and South Korea in 1998, an apology addressing past transgressions on the Japanese side was issued from PM Obuchi Keizo to ROK President Kim Dae-jung.

=== Perspectives on Historical Issues ===
Overall, the declaration does not mention in detail the exact stances on major historical issues; it fails to mention any specific historical wrongdoings and clarify stances on historical events. At the time, PM Obuchi faced difficulties in producing a clear narrative on the historical issues with ROK due to inconsistency within the Japanese government and the leading political party LDP. PM Obuchi therefore made use of the previous statement issued by Murayama Tomiichi in 1995, also known as the Murayama Statement, which was the first ever apology issued by a Japanese prime minister that specifically mentions the words ‘colonial rule’, and President Kim Dae-jung was thus inclined to accept and move on.

=== Textbook Issue ===
Another point with the declaration that has been raised is the lack of enforcement and apparent emergence of the textbook issue. In the second section that outlines the agreements made between Japan and ROK in 1998, it is written that “both leaders shared the view that it was important that the peoples both countries, the young generation in particular, deepen their understanding of history, and stressed the need to devote much attention and effort to that end”. Although Japanese textbooks covered the comfort women issue during the 1990s, it is reported that they no longer contain information on the issue, which may contribute further to the current issues between ROK and Japan.

== Relation to 1998 Jiang Zemin State visit in Tokyo ==
On November 25, 1998, general secretary of the Chinese Communist Party and China's top leader (1989–2002) Jiang Zemin and his wife Wang Yeping made a state visit to Japan that lasted for five days. CCP general secretary Jiang Zemin and his wife Wang Yeping spent three days in Tokyo, from which they traveled north to visit Sendai and Sapporo before departing from Sapporo on November 30.

During this state visit, the Chinese had hoped for a stronger expression of apology, such as the apology that PM Obuchi had issued President Kim Dae-jung the month before. Prior to the state visit, a Chinese official had expressed that the apology issued to ROK would be satisfactory if issued similarly to China by changing the words ‘Korean people’ and ‘colonial rule’ to ‘Chinese people’ and ‘aggression’. China was never issued any written apology in the Joint Declaration such as the one issued to ROK, and CCP general secretary Jiang Zemin was instead given an oral apology by Prime Minister Obuchi Keizo that was complemented by a written statement in the declaration that expressed “deep remorse” over past wartime atrocities.

The Chinese side was disappointed that they had not received the apology they expected, and CCP general secretary Jiang Zemin expressed his frustration with the Japanese leaders during the state banquet hosted by Emperor Akihito on November 26, and several times more during his November 28 speech at Waseda University and later that same day during his news conference that was held in Tokyo. The state visit has thus come to be remembered as one of the worst state visits in Japanese public memory.

== See also ==
- Japan–Korea disputes
- History of Japan–Korea relations
- Murayama Statement
- Kono Statement
- 1998 State Visit by Jiang Zemin to Japan
- Comfort Women
- Asian Women's Fund
