= List of members of the National Assembly (South Korea), 1963–1967 =

The members of the sixth National Assembly of South Korea were elected on 26 November 1963. The assembly sat from 17 December 1963 until 30 June 1967.

== Members ==
Province/City	Constituency	Member	Party	
Province/City	Constituency	Member	At election	At term's end
Seoul	Jongno	Jeon Jin-han (Note: Jeon Jin-han resigned on 13 March 1967.)	CRP	NDP
Seoul	Jung	Jeong Il-hyeong (Note: Jeong Il-hyeong resigned on 13 August 1965.)	Democratic	Minjung
Seoul	Jung	Sin In-u (Note: Sin In-u was by-elected on 9 November 1965, to succeed Jeong Il-hyeong, but resigned on 10 May 1967.)	Minjung	NDP
Seoul	Dongdaemun A	Min Gwan-sik	DRP	DRP
Seoul	Dongdaemun B	Lee Yeong-jun	CRP	NDP
Seoul	Seongdong A	Yu Seong-gwon (Note: Yu Seong-gwon resigned on 11 May 1967.)	Democratic	NDP
Seoul	Seongdong B	Park Jun-gyu	DRP	DRP
Seoul	Seongbuk A	Jo Yun-hyeong	CRP	NDP
Seoul	Seongbuk B	Seo Beom-seok	CRP	NDP
Seoul	Seodaemun A	Kim Jae-gwang (Note: Kim Jae-gwang resigned on 13 August 1965.)	CRP	Minjung
Seoul	Seodaemun A	Kim Sang-hyeon (Note: Kim Sang-hyeon was by-elected on 9 November 1965, to succeed Kim Jae-gwang.)	Minjung	NDP
Seoul	Seodaemun B	Yun Je-sul (Note: Yun Je-sul resigned on 13 August 1965.)	CRP	Minjung
Seoul	Seodaemun B	Hong Yeong-gi (Note: Hong Yeong-gi was by-elected on 9 November 1965, to succeed Yun Je-sul, but resigned on 13 May 1967.)	Minjung	NDP
Seoul	Mapo	Park Sun-cheon	Democratic	NDP
Seoul	Yongsan	Seo Min-ho (Note: Seo Min-ho resigned on 13 August 1965.)	LDP	Minjung
Seoul	Yongsan	Kim Du-han (Note: Kim Du-han was by-elected on 9 November 1965, to succeed Seo Min-ho, but resigned on 24 September 1966.)	KIP	KIP
Seoul	Yeongdeungpo A	Han Tong-suk	Democratic	NDP
Seoul	Yeongdeungpo B	Park Han-sang	CRP	NDP
Busan	Jung	Jo Si-hyeong	DRP	DRP
Busan	Yeongdo	Ye Chun-ho	DRP	DRP
Busan	Seo	Kim Young-sam	CRP	NDP
Busan	Dong	Lee Jong-sun	DRP	DRP
Busan	Busanjin A	Kim Im-sik	DRP	DRP
Busan	Busanjin B	Choi Du-go	DRP	DRP
Busan	Dongnae	Yang Geuk-pil	DRP	DRP
Gyeonggi Province	Incheon A	Ryu Seung-won	DRP	DRP
Gyeonggi Province	Incheon B	Kim Eun-ha	CRP	NDP
Gyeonggi Province	Suwon	Lee Byeong-hui	DRP	DRP
Gyeonggi Province	Uijeongbu–Yangju	Gang Seung-gu	CRP	NDP
Gyeonggi Province	Gwangju–Icheon	Sin Ha-gyun	CRP	NDP
Gyeonggi Province	Pocheon–Gapyeong–Yeoncheon	Hong Ik-pyo	Democratic	NDP
Gyeonggi Province	Yeoju–Yangpyeong	Lee Baek-il	DRP	DRP
Gyeonggi Province	Yongin–Anseong	Seo Sang-rin	DRP	DRP
Gyeonggi Province	Pyeongtaek	Ryu Chi-song	CRP	NDP
Gyeonggi Province	Hwaseong	Gwon O-seok	DRP	DRP
Gyeonggi Province	Goyang–Paju	Hwang In-won	CRP	NDP
Gyeonggi Province	Gimpo–Ganghwa	Lee Don-hae	DRP	DRP
Gyeonggi Province	Siheung–Bucheon–Ongjin	Ok Jo-nam	DRP	DRP
Gangwon Province	Chuncheon–Chunseong	Sin Ok-cheol	DRP	DRP
Gangwon Province	Wonju–Wonseong	Park Yeong-rok	Democratic	NDP
Gangwon Province	Gangneung–Myeongju	Kim Sam	LDP	NDP
Gangwon Province	Hongcheon–Inje	Lee Seung-chun	DRP	DRP
Gangwon Province	Yeongwol–Jeongseon	Eom Jeong-ju (Note: Eom Jeong-ju resigned on 4 May 1967.)	DRP	DRP
Gangwon Province	Cheolwon–Hwacheon–Yanggu	Kim Jae-sun	DRP	DRP
Gangwon Province	Sokcho–Yangyang–Goseong	Kim Jong-ho	DRP	DRP
Gangwon Province	Hoeseong–Pyeongchang	Hwang Ho-hyeon (Note: Hwang Ho-hyeon resigned on 15 May 1967.)	DRP	DRP
Gangwon Province	Samcheok	Kim Jin-man	DRP	DRP
North Chungcheong Province	Cheongju	Jeong Tae-seong	DRP	DRP
North Chungcheong Province	Cheongwon	Sin Gwon-u	DRP	DRP
North Chungcheong Province	Chungju–Jungwon	Lee Hui-seung (Note: Lee Hui-seung resigned on 10 May 1967.)	LDP	NDP
North Chungcheong Province	Okcheon–Boeun	Yuk In-su	DRP	DRP
North Chungcheong Province	Gwisan	An Dong-jun	DRP	DRP
North Chungcheong Province	Yeongdong	Lee Dong-jin (Note: Lee Dong-jin resigned on 10 May 1967.)	DRP	DRP
North Chungcheong Province	Jincheon–Eumseong	Lee Chung-hwan	CRP	NDP
North Chungcheong Province	Jecheon–Danyang	Kim Jong-mu	DRP	DRP
South Chungcheong Province	Daejeon	Jin Hyeong-ha (Note: Jin Hyeong-ha resigned on 13 May 1967.)	CRP	NDP
South Chungcheong Province	Daedeok–Yeongi	Kim Yong-tae	DRP	DRP
South Chungcheong Province	Gongju	Park Chan	CRP	NDP
South Chungcheong Province	Nonsan	Yang Sun-jik	DRP	DRP
South Chungcheong Province	Buyeo	Kim Jong-pil	DRP	DRP
South Chungcheong Province	Seocheon–Boryeong	Kim Jong-gap	DRP	DRP
South Chungcheong Province	Cheongyang–Hongseong	Lee Sang-cheol	People's	NDP
South Chungcheong Province	Yesan	Han Geon-su	People's	NDP
South Chungcheong Province	Seosan	Lee Sang-hui	DRP	DRP
South Chungcheong Province	Dangjin	In Tae-sik (Note: In Tae-sik resigned on 12 May 1967.)	DRP	DRP
South Chungcheong Province	Asan	Lee Yeong-jin	DRP	DRP
South Chungcheong Province	Cheonan–Cheonwon	Lee Sang-don	CRP	NDP
South Chungcheong Province	Geumsan	Gil Jae-ho	DRP	DRP
North Jeolla Province	Jeonju	Ryu Cheong	CRP	NDP
North Jeolla Province	Gunsan–Okgu	Go Hyeong-gon (Note: Go Hyeong-gon resigned on 13 May 1967.)	CRP	NDP
North Jeolla Province	Iri–Iksan	Kim Seong-chol	DRP	DRP
North Jeolla Province	Wanju	Choi Yeong-du	DRP	DRP
North Jeolla Province	Jinan–Jangsu–Muju	Jeon Hyu-sang	DRP	DRP
North Jeolla Province	Imsil–Sunchang	Han Sang-jun	DRP	DRP
North Jeolla Province	Namwon	Ryu Gwang-hyeon	DRP	DRP
North Jeolla Province	Jeongeup	Na Yong-gyun (Note: Na Yong-gyun resigned on 28 April 1967.)	Democratic	NDP
North Jeolla Province	Gochang	Kim Sang-heum	CRP	NDP
North Jeolla Province	Buan	Lee Byeong-ok (Note: Lee Byeong-ok was removed on 2 September 1965, after his election was invalidated, but returned by being by-elected on 13 September 1965.)	DRP	DRP
North Jeolla Province	Gimje	Jang Gyeong-sun	DRP	DRP
South Jeolla Province	Gwangju A	Jeong Seong-tae (Note: Jeong Seong-tae resigned on 13 August 1965.)	CRP	Minjung
South Jeolla Province	Gwangju A	Yu Su-hyeon (Note: Yu Su-hyeon was by-elected on 9 November 1965, to succeed Jeong Seong-tae.)	RCA	NDP
South Jeolla Province	Gwangju B	Jeong Rae-jeong	DRP	DRP
South Jeolla Province	Mokpo	Kim Dae-jung	Democratic	NDP
South Jeolla Province	Yeosu–Yeocheon	Lee U-heon	DRP	DRP
South Jeolla Province	Suncheon–Seungju	Jo Gyeong-han	DRP	DRP
South Jeolla Province	Damyang–Jangseong	Park Seung-gyu (Note: Park Seung-gyu resigned on 12 May 1967.)	DRP	DRP
South Jeolla Province	Hwasun–Gokseong	Yang Hoe-su	CRP	NDP
South Jeolla Province	Gurye–Gwangyang	Kim Seon-ju	DRP	DRP
South Jeolla Province	Goheung	Sin Hyeong-sik	DRP	DRP
South Jeolla Province	Boseong	Lee Jeong-rae	CRP	NDP
South Jeolla Province	Jangheung	Gil Jeon-sik	DRP	DRP
South Jeolla Province	Yeongam–Gangjin	Kim Chun-yon (Note: Kim Chun-yon resigned on 20 February 1967.)	LDP	NDP
South Jeolla Province	Wando	Choi Seo-il	DRP	DRP
South Jeolla Province	Haenam	Min Yeong-nam	LDP	Independent
South Jeolla Province	Muan	Bae Gil-do	DRP	DRP
South Jeolla Province	Naju	Jeong Myeong-seop	LDP	NDP
South Jeolla Province	Gwangsan	Park Jong-tae	DRP	DRP
South Jeolla Province	Yeonggwang–Hampyeong	Jeong Heon-jo	DRP	DRP
South Jeolla Province	Jindo	Lee Nam-jun	DRP	DRP
North Gyeongsang Province	Jung, Daegu	Song Gwan-su	DRP	DRP
North Gyeongsang Province	Dong, Daegu	Lee Won-man	DRP	DRP
North Gyeongsang Province	Nam, Daegu	Lee Hyo-sang	DRP	DRP
North Gyeongsang Province	Buk–Seo, Daegu	Kim Jong-hwan	DRP	DRP
North Gyeongsang Province	Pohang–Yeongil–Ulleung	Kim Jang-seop	DRP	DRP
North Gyeongsang Province	Gimcheon–Geumneung	Baek Nam-eok	DRP	DRP
North Gyeongsang Province	Gyeongju–Wolseong	Lee Sang-mu	DRP	DRP
North Gyeongsang Province	Dalseong–Goryeong	Kim Seong-gon	DRP	DRP
North Gyeongsang Province	Gunwi–Seonsan	Kim Bong-hwan	DRP	DRP
North Gyeongsang Province	Uiseong	O Sang-sik	DRP	DRP
North Gyeongsang Province	Andong City–Andong County	Gwon O-hun	DRP	DRP
North Gyeongsang Province	Cheongsong–Yeongdeok	Kim Jung-han	DRP	DRP
North Gyeongsang Province	Yeongyang–Uljin	Jin Gi-bae	CRP	NDP
North Gyeongsang Province	Yeongcheon	Lee Hwal	DRP	DRP
North Gyeongsang Province	Gyeongsan–Cheongdo	Kim Jun-tae	DRP	DRP
North Gyeongsang Province	Seongju–Chilgok	Song Han-cheol	DRP	DRP
North Gyeongsang Province	Sangju	Kim Jeong-geun	DRP	DRP
North Gyeongsang Province	Mungyeong	Lee Dong-nyeong	DRP	DRP
North Gyeongsang Province	Yecheon	Jeong Jin-dong	DRP	DRP
North Gyeongsang Province	Yeongju–Bonghwa	Kim Chang-geun	DRP	DRP
South Gyeongsang Province	Masan	Gang Seon-gyu (Note: Gang Seon-gyu resigned on 10 May 1967.)	CRP	NDP
South Gyeongsang Province	Jinju–Jinyang	Gu Tae-hoe	DRP	DRP
South Gyeongsang Province	Chungmu–Tongyeong–Goseong	Choi Seok-rim	DRP	DRP
South Gyeongsang Province	Geoje	Kim Ju-in	DRP	DRP
South Gyeongsang Province	Jinhae–Changwon	Choi Su-yong (Note: Choi Su-yong resigned on 10 May 1967.)	CRP	NDP
South Gyeongsang Province	Samcheonpo–Sacheon–Hadong	Kim Yong-sun	DRP	DRP
South Gyeongsang Province	Haman–Uiryeong	Bang Seong-chul	DRP	DRP
South Gyeongsang Province	Changnyeong	Sin Yeong-ju	DRP	DRP
South Gyeongsang Province	Sancheong–Hapcheon	Byeon Jong-bong	DRP	DRP
South Gyeongsang Province	Milyang	Lee Jae-man	DRP	DRP
South Gyeongsang Province	Yangsan–Dongnae	No Jae-pil	DRP	DRP
South Gyeongsang Province	Ulsan–Ulju	Choi Yeong-geun	Democratic	NDP
South Gyeongsang Province	Gimhae	Kim Taek-su	DRP	DRP
South Gyeongsang Province	Namhae	Choi Chi-hwan	DRP	DRP
South Gyeongsang Province	Hamyang–Geochang	Min Byeong-gwon	DRP	DRP
Jeju Province	Jeju–Bukjeju	Im Byeong-su	DRP	DRP
Jeju Province	Namjeju	Hyeon O-bong	DRP	DRP
National	Proportional representation	Jeong Gu-yeong	DRP	DRP
National	Proportional representation	Kim Seong-jin	DRP	DRP
National	Proportional representation	Lee Jong-geuk	DRP	DRP
National	Proportional representation	Min Byeong-gi	DRP	DRP
National	Proportional representation	Kim Dong-hwan	DRP	DRP
National	Proportional representation	Sin Yun-chang	DRP	DRP
National	Proportional representation	O Chi-seong	DRP	DRP
National	Proportional representation	Park Hyeon-suk	DRP	DRP
National	Proportional representation	Gang Sang-uk	DRP	DRP
National	Proportional representation	Jo Chang-dae	DRP	DRP
National	Proportional representation	Lee Jong-geun	DRP	DRP
National	Proportional representation	O Hak-jin	DRP	DRP
National	Proportional representation	Kim U-gyeong	DRP	DRP
National	Proportional representation	Kim Byeong-sun	DRP	DRP
National	Proportional representation	Seo In-seok	DRP	DRP
National	Proportional representation	Lee Man-seop	DRP	DRP
National	Proportional representation	Jo Nam-cheol	DRP	DRP
National	Proportional representation	Han Tae-yeon	DRP	DRP
National	Proportional representation	Choi Jeong-gi	DRP	DRP
National	Proportional representation	Cha Ji-cheol	DRP	DRP
National	Proportional representation	Park Gyu-sang	DRP	DRP
National	Proportional representation	Kim Ho-chil	DRP	DRP
National	Proportional representation	Yun Po-sun (Note: Yun Po-sun resigned on 13 August 1965.)	CRP	Minjung
National	Proportional representation	Jeong Hae-yeong (Note: Jeong Hae-yeong resigned on 2 September 1965.)	CRP	Minjung
National	Proportional representation	Yu Chin-san	CRP	NDP
National	Proportional representation	Go Heung-mun	CRP	NDP
National	Proportional representation	Kim Ik-gi	CRP	NDP
National	Proportional representation	Gang Mun-bong	CRP	DRP
National	Proportional representation	Kim Hyeong-il	CRP	NDP
National	Proportional representation	Jeong Un-geun	CRP	NDP
National	Proportional representation	Park Sam-jun	CRP	NDP
National	Proportional representation	Ham Deok-yong	CRP	NDP
National	Proportional representation	Bang Il-hong	CRP	NDP
National	Proportional representation	Ryu Hong	CRP	NDP
National	Proportional representation	Ryu Jin (Note: Ryu Jin resigned on 13 May 1967.)	CRP	NDP
National	Proportional representation	Lee Jung-jae	CRP	NDP
National	Proportional representation	Im Cha-ju (Note: Im Cha-ju took office on 13 August 1965, to succeed Yun Po-sun, but resigned on 26 June 1967.)	Minjung (Note: Included in the Civil Rule Party list in the 1963 election.)	NDP
National	Proportional representation	Lee U-tae (Note: Lee U-tae took office on 2 September 1965, to succeed Jeong Hae-yeong.)	Minjung	NDP
National	Proportional representation	Park Jung-han (Note: Park Jung-han took office on 13 May 1967, to succeed Ryu Jin.)	NDP	NDP
National	Proportional representation	U Gap-rin (Note: U Gap-rin took office on 26 June 1967, to succeed Im Cha-ju.)	NDP	NDP
National	Proportional representation	Jo Jae-cheon (Note: Jo Jae-cheon resigned on 2 September 1965.)	Democratic	Minjung
National	Proportional representation	Kim Seong-yong (Note: Kim Seong-yong resigned on 4 November 1966.)	Democratic	Minjung
National	Proportional representation	Ryu Chang-yeol	Democratic	NDP
National	Proportional representation	Jang Chi-hun	Democratic	NDP
National	Proportional representation	Choi Hui-song	Democratic	DRP
National	Proportional representation	Gye Gwang-sun (Note: Gye Gwang-sun took office on 12 October 1965, to succeed Jo Jae-cheon.)	Minjung (Note: Included in the Democratic Party list in the 1963 election.)	NDP
National	Proportional representation	Han Geun-jo (Note: Han Geun-jo took office on 4 November 1966, to succeed Kim Seong-yong, but resigned on 30 December 1966.)	Minjung	Minjung
National	Proportional representation	Lee Tae-yong (Note: Lee Tae-yong took office on 30 December 1966, to succeed Han Geun-jo.)	Minjung	NDP
National	Proportional representation	Kim Do-yeon (Note: Kim Do-yeon resigned on 13 August 1965.)	LDP	Minjung
National	Proportional representation	So Seon-gyu	LDP	Independent
National	Proportional representation	Son Chang-gyu	LDP	NDP
National	Proportional representation	Kim Jae-wi (Note: Kim Jae-wi took office on 13 August 1965, to succeed Kim Do-yeon, but resigned on 20 June 1967.)	Minjung (Note: Included in the Liberal Democratic Party list in the 1963 election.)	NDP
National	Proportional representation	Lee Won-hong (Note: Lee Won-hong took office on 20 June 1967, to succeed Kim Jae-wi.)	NDP	NDP

== See also ==
- 1963 South Korean legislative election
- National Assembly (South Korea)#History
