= New Korea Party (1966–67) =

1966–1967 political party in South Korea

The New Korea Party (Korean: 신한당; Hanja: 新韓党) was a conservative opposition party in South Korea during the Third Republic, formed by the pro-constitutional amendment faction of the People's Party (1965–67), affiliated with Yun Po-sun. It merged with the People's Party and was dissolved upon the formation of the unified New Democratic Party.

== Overview ==
On 22 June 1965, the Treaty on Basic Relations Between Japan and the Republic of Korea was enacted. The treaty was then ratified in the National Assembly by the unilateral votes of the Democratic Republican Party on 14 August, prompting the hard-line members of the People's Party (Yun Po-sun's faction), who had already resigned in opposition of the treaty, to defect from the party entirely. Subsequently, these defectors mobilized members of the Democratic Party Club, the former Liberal Party, some progressive groups, and academic representatives for a convention to initiate the founding of a new party on 15 February 1966, aimed at the next presidential and legislative elections in 1967. After the selection of Yun Po-sun as chief representative, Chang Taek-sang as counselor, and Kim Do-yeon and Jeong Il-hyeong as committee representatives, they held a founding meeting on 30 March and nominated Yun Po-sun as both the party leader and the next presidential candidate.

The New Korea Party established that its immediate goal was a regime change in the civil administration, and advanced a hard-line campaign against the ruling party, disclosing the injustices of the Republican regime and hosting assemblies throughout Korea to censure the Democratic Republicans. However, pressured by voices calling for a unified opposition candidate in the 1967 presidential election, the New Korea Party agreed on the condition that Yu Jin-o, the People's Party candidate, withdraw from the race. Thus, in February 1967, the party was automatically dissolved with the formation of the unified New Democratic Party.
