= Fusen Ketsugi =

The Resolution to Renew the Determination for Peace on the Basis of Lessons Learned from History (歴史を教訓に平和への決意を新たにする決議, Rekishi o Kyōkun ni Heiwa he no Ketsui o Arata ni suru Ketsugi), also known as Fusen Ketsugi (不戦決議), is a Diet Resolution (国会決議, Kokkai Ketsugi) issued by the House of Representatives of Japan on June 9, 1995:

The House of Representatives resolves as follows:

On the occasion of the 50th anniversary of the end of World War II, this House offers its sincere condolences to those who fell in action and victims of wars and similar actions all over the world.

Solemnly reflecting upon many instances of colonial rule and acts of aggression in the modern history of the world, and recognizing that Japan carried out those acts in the past, inflicting pain and suffering upon the peoples of other countries, especially in Asia, the Members of this House express a sense of deep remorse.

We must transcend the differences over historical views of the past war and learn humbly the lessons of history so as to build a peaceful international society.

This House expresses its resolve, under the banner of eternal peace enshrined in the Constitution of Japan, to join hands with other nations of the world and to pave the way to a future that allows all human beings to live together.

The original draft of the resolution that was submitted by Japan Socialist Party and the Speaker of the House of Representatives Takako Doi contained stronger expressions of apology. However, it was weakened by Liberal Democratic Party with whom Japan Socialist Party formed a coalition cabinet.

Out of 502 representatives, 251 participated in the final vote on the revised resolution, and 230 of them supported the resolution; 241 representatives abstained from voting; 70 absentees belonged in one of the three parties in the coalition cabinet that sponsored the resolution (Japan Socialist Party, Liberal Democratic Party, and New Party Sakigake).

- 14 members of the Japanese Communist Party voted against the resolution because they wanted much stronger expressions in the resolution.
- 50 members of the conservative Liberal Democratic Party did not participate because the expressions in the revised resolution were still too strong for them.
- 14 members of the Japan Socialist Party did not participate because the expressions were not strong enough for them.
- 141 members of New Frontier Party abstained from voting, some of whom wanted stronger expressions.

== See also ==
- List of war apology statements issued by Japan
- On the occasion of the 50th anniversary of the war's end

== References& sources ==
- Beauchamp, Edward R.(1998), History of contemporary Japan, Garland, ISBN 9780815327288
- WFM Japan page for Fusen Ketsugi(Japanese)
