= State visit by Jiang Zemin to Japan =

1998 diplomatic visit by the Chinese leader

Chinese President Jiang Zemin was on a state visit to Japan from 25 to 30 November 1998. It was also Jiang's second visit to Japan after succeeding General Secretary of the Chinese Communist Party in 1989, following an earlier visit in April 1992. The goal of this state visit was to create a joint document with a forward-looking character that would set the path for Sino-Japanese relations in the 21st century. The visit was significant because it was the first visit to Japan ever made by the head of state of China. Both governments treated the Japan-China Joint Declaration On Building a Partnership of Friendship and Cooperation for Peace and Development—issued by the two governments on the occasion of visit—as a third important bilateral document, following the 1972 Joint Communiqué and the 1978 Treaty of Peace and Friendship. The two sides repeatedly have stressed that all problems should be handled in line with these three documents. China's expectations for this trip was high because in the previous month, South Korean President Kim Dae-Jung made his state visit to Japan which was considered successful. Despite high expectations, the state visit was considered a failure because Jiang Zemin and Prime Minister of Japan Keizō Obuchi were unable to reach conclusive agreements on matters concerning history, Taiwan, and Japan's permanent membership in the UN Security Council. As a result, the Japanese public and media had a negative view towards Jiang, which ultimately hardened Japan's attitude towards China.

== Historical background ==
=== Sino-Japanese relations ===
Japanese public sentiments towards China dramatically faltered after the 1989 Tiananmen Square protests and massacre and the demise of the Soviet Union that was a common enemy for Japan and China. According to a government survey, the percentage of those who held “close feelings” toward China dropped to 51.6% in October 1989 from 68.5% during the same period in 1988. Relations between the two states further declined when the People's Liberation Army (PLA) conducted nuclear weapon tests from October 1993 to July 1996, despite fierce criticism from Tokyo. Taking into account public anger, deeply rooted in anti-nuclear feelings, Japan had no choice but to impose sanctions on China in the form of discontinuing ODA grants. It is believed that 1995-96 marked the lowest point of Sino-Japanese bilateral relations since 1972 - when the two countries normalized their relationship through the Japan-China Joint Communique. Realizing both sides’ economic interdependence, a meeting between foreign ministers in September 1996 marked the beginning of attempts to improve Sino-Japanese relations. On April 6, 1992, Jiang Zemin, General Secretary of the Chinese Communist Party (paramount leader), visited Japan and invited Japanese Emperor Akihito and Empress Michiko to visit China.

=== Origin of China's anti-foreign sentiments ===
Chinese nationalism is both a bottom-up movement as much as it is a top-down enactment. From the bottom-up perspective, Chinese nationalism is a belated response to the mistreatment of China by foreign states, stemming from the First Sino-Japanese War in 1894 where the Japanese victory resulted in the loss of China's hegemonic status for the first time in history. A century of humiliation ensued which refers to the period of intervention and imperialism by the West and Japan until 1949. Furthermore, in the post-Cold War era, Chinese nationalism took form as mainly reactive sentiments, such as public protests, to foreign suppressions in modern history that gave rise to a sense of wounded national pride and an anti-foreign (particularly the U.S. and Japan) resentment. Many Chinese intellectuals gave voice to the rising nationalistic discourse in the 1990s.

From the top-down perspective, Chinese nationalism in the 1990s was also a construction enacted by the Chinese Communist Party. Although there were no major military threats to China's security after the Cold War, the decay of Communist ideology gave rise to an internal legitimacy crisis that became a grave concern for the Chinese state. In response, China substituted performance legitimacy provided by surging economic development and nationalist legitimacy provided by invocation of the distinctive characteristics of Chinese culture in place of Marxist-Lenin and Mao Zedong Thought. In order to further perpetuate Chinese nationalism into the minds of children, the Communist government launched the patriotic education campaign after the 1989 Tiananmen Square protests and massacre. The patriotic education campaign was announced in 1991 and was fully functioning in 1994. Through educational reform, it fostered a sense of Chinese nationalism by warning of the existence of hostile international forces perpetuating imperialist insult to Chinese pride. This allowed the state to legitimize its authoritative rule on a non-Communist basis and ensured loyalty in a population that was otherwise subject to many domestic discontents.

=== Murayama statement ===
In 1995, Japanese Prime Minister Tomiichi Murayama sought to express an apology that the Liberal Democratic Party of Japan had refused to issue for over 50 years. He took the initiative of drafting the statement that would be read at the 50th anniversary ceremony of WWII. It was the first time a government official issued an unambiguous apology for Japan's wartime actions.

Murayama stated as follows: “During a certain period in the not too distant past, Japan, following a mistaken national policy, advanced along the road to war, only to ensnare the Japanese people in a fateful crisis, and, through its colonial rule and aggression, caused tremendous damage and suffering to the people of many countries, particularly to those of Asian nations. In the hope that no such mistake be made in the future, I regard, in a spirit of humility, these irrefutable facts of history, and express here once again my feelings of deep remorse and state my heartfelt apology. Allow me also to express my feelings of profound mourning for all victims, both at home and abroad, of that history.”

Beijing and other Asian capitals initially welcomed Murayama's statement acknowledging the apology. Prime Minister Obuchi used the Murayama statement to settle the fierce negotiations over the matter of historical recognition in the Joint Declaration with Korea and China. However at a November 1998 foreign ministers gathering in Malaysia, Chinese Minister Tang Jiaxuan stressed that the issues of historical recognition and Taiwan were central for issuing the Joint Declaration. China specifically demanded to bring the term “apology” into the Joint Declaration.

=== Link to the October 1998 State Visit by South Korean President Kim Dae-Jung ===
In October 1998, South Korean President Kim Dae-Jung visited Japanese Prime Minister Keizo Obuchi to issue a joint statement in Tokyo where Obuchi expressed his “heartfelt apologies” to the Korean people for their suffering under Japanese colonial rule. Kim responded with “sincere acceptance.” The statement was significant because it was the first written apology issued by Japan to any country after the atrocities of WWII.

Kim's successful trip to Japan had raised Chinese expectations as CCP General Secretary Jiang Zemin was scheduled to visit Tokyo in November 1998. An editorial in Hong Kong's South China Morning Post declared that “China should get an apology every bit as profuse as Korea's.”

== Description of the Visit ==
During the visit, President Jiang met Emperor Akihito, Empress Michiko, Prime Minister Obuchi and his wife, President of the House of Councillors, Speaker of the House of Representatives, leaders of main political parties, seven former Prime Ministers, and old friends and their families in Japan. Furthermore, Jiang attended receptions hosted by seven organizations for friendship between Japan and China. He delivered a speech at Waseda University and visited not only Tokyo but also Sendai and Osaka.

In an oral statement, Prime Minister Obuchi expressed his “heartfelt apologies” to the Chinese people. While Emperor Akihito toasted Jiang at a state dinner, the Chinese and Japanese diplomats could not agree on the wording of their joint declaration. In the end, Japan only expressed “deep remorse” rather than “heartfelt apologies” in the written document. The continued refusal by Obuchi to offer an apology led Jiang to lecture him on Japan's failings to appropriately address history. The signing ceremony was cancelled because neither Obuchi nor Jiang was willing to sign the document. In regards to the matter of Taiwan, after fierce negotiations, the Taiwanese section was cut down considerably to four lines, as both sides failed to gain ground on the issue.

== Critical response ==
The Japanese public and media had a negative view on the visit. This was largely because the Joint Declaration was not signed at an official signing ceremony and many major daily papers and television news broadcasts reported that it was because Jiang was not happy with the negotiations. Some acknowledged Obuchi's difficulty in offering an acceptable apology due to the pressure of the powerful anti-China and pro-Taiwan rightist groups in Japan, while protesters in Beijing immediately denounced Jiang for not getting a fuller apology from Obuchi. The largely negative reaction to Jiang's behaviour during the visit hardened Japan's attitude towards China, which would have more far reaching repercussions on the relationship of the two countries. Meanwhile, forums appeared overseas which admired Jiang's behaviour as showing national spirit and boldness of vision, especially in his speech at Waseda University. Nonetheless, Jiang's strong criticism of Japan was perceived to have failed, resulting in China to soften its rhetoric on Japan's treatment of its war history.

== Stances on History ==
=== China ===
Chinese Foreign Minister Tang Jiaxuan wanted Tokyo to make a statement of “apology” for past military aggression by using the term “apology” into the Joint Declaration. During negotiations, a high ranking Chinese official in the Foreign Ministry told a Japanese counterpart that the Chinese would not continue to work on drafting a joint document unless Tokyo made an official apology in the document. Part of the reason why China chose to take a hard stance on the controversial issue of history was because Jiang was under pressure to protect himself from conservative criticism, and he used the state visit as a vie for popularity with the Chinese people to solidify his legitimacy. His only claim to leadership thus far was being selected by Deng Xiaoping.

=== Japan ===
Obuchi refused to use the Murayama statement despite unbending demands by China to issue an official apology. This was because he thought that the Emperor Akihito's visit to China in 1992 where he said that he “deeply deplore(s) the “great sufferings” Japan inflicted on the Chinese people during the war, was sufficient. Obuchi's deputy spokesman and one of his close aides, Akitaka Saiki, told Reuters after the meeting that Tokyo could not agree to a written apology similar to the one offering in South Korea because the cases were different. Obuchi also considered how issuing another apology to China would hurt the dignity of the Emperor which was not possible from the point of view of a conservative politician. Obuchi was also concerned with calls in his party, the LDP, to exclude the apology from the Joint Declaration. Most importantly, Obuchi failed to gain a critical concession from Beijing - by which China would announce that it would refrain from bringing up the issue of history at future summits. Considering the potential negative impacts on future Sino-Japanese relations, Obuchi offered a compromise, a verbal apology during the summit.

== Stances on Taiwan ==
=== China ===
CCP General Secretary Jiang Zemin urged Tokyo to abide by the 1972 joint communique in which reiterates that Taiwan is an inalienable part of the People's Republic of China. This was crucial for Beijing because it wanted Tokyo to exclude the Taiwan Straits from the scope of the New Guidelines for Japan-U.S. Defense Cooperation. Furthermore, Beijing was confident in convincing Japan because of a successful summit in June 1998 with US President Bill Clinton.

=== Japan ===
In response to China's demands, Obuchi said, “Japan's basic understanding is that China is a single entity. We have strictly maintained that position consistently. Our position of not supporting Taiwan's independence will not change from now on either.” However, Japan avoided confrontation with China on the matter of the new defense guidelines. This was because they believed that situations in the areas surrounding Japan, in which Japan could cooperate with US forces, are not based purely on geography. Furthermore, Tokyo wanted the Joint Declaration to reflect its hope for a peaceful resolution of the Taiwan Straits issue, thereby aiming to restrain Beijing from using force over the Taiwan issue - but failed to do so.

== Stances on Japan's Permanent Membership in the UN Security Council ==
Both sides agreed to include a section that stresses the importance of UN activity in the area of maintaining peace in the region, and for economic and social development throughout the world.

=== China ===
Since the beginning of the debate in the early 1990s, in regards to Japan's right to membership in the UN Security Council, China is the only country among the five permanent members of the Security Council to show hesitation. China refused to firmly support Japan's permanent membership in the joint statement.

=== Japan ===
Tokyo sought Chinese approval for Japan's permanent membership on the UN Security Council. Japanese policy makers believed that permanent membership would increase Japanese political influence in the region, thereby decrease Chinese influence in the region as well as in the Security Council.

== Outcomes ==
- Issued the Joint Declaration of the Establishment of Partnership of Friendship and Cooperation for Peace and Development
- Signed the Framework Cooperation Program for Exchanges Between Youth of China and Japan
- Joint Communique Between China and Japan on Environmental Cooperation in the 21st Century
- Agreement Between China and Japan on Exchanges and Cooperation in Science and Industrial Technology

The documents which were in the form of a joint press communique, defined the nature of the relations between China and Japan, development of their friendly exchanges and cooperation in various fields in the 21st century, and identified all-around arrangements for the development. Japan pledged more than $3 billion in development loans to help with energy, transportation and environmental projects.

== Future Developments ==
Despite growing anti-China feelings in the 1990s, trade between Japan and China increased dramatically. Total trade in 1999 amounted to $66 million, 33 times the amount in 1973, and nearly four times the amount in 1990. China has become Japan's second largest trading partner, while Japan has been China's largest trading partner for seven consecutive years. In an attempt to repair relations after Jiang's visit, Prime Minister Zhu Rongji visited Tokyo the next year and adopted a so-called 'smile diplomacy', avoiding any heavy criticism of Japan in regards to apologies. The visit in October 2000 helped to ease the impact of Jiang's visit, and served to protect China's economic interests vested in Japan.

However, incidents such as Chinese maritime research activities and Chinese criticisms of Japanese history textbook controversies indicate that Sino-Japanese relations remain unstable. The Japanese public still tend to see China as a potential threat, and the continued resurfacing of demands for apologies from Japan has led to a state of “apology fatigue” by the public, further hindering the progress beyond the two countries’ past. On the other hand, China points to continued visits by Japan's Cabinet to the Yasukuni Shrine, where 14 Class A war criminals from World War II are enshrined, as showing insincere intentions to mend relations as they do not send the same message as the spoken remorse by Japanese Prime Ministers.
