= People's Party (South Korea, 1965–67) =

1965–1967 political party in South Korea

The People’s Party (Korean: 민중당의; Hanja: 民衆党) was a conservative political party in the Third Republic of South Korea. It was formed through the unification of conservative opposition parties at the forefront of the existing movement against diplomatic restoration between Japan and Korea.

== Overview ==
The People’s Party was formed on 3 May 1965, following the unification of the Civil Rule Party, the largest opposition party within the National Assembly at the time, and the Democratic Party, the second largest opposition party. It was the first unified opposition party since the onset of the Third Republic, and Park Sun-cheon, the leader of the Democratic Party, was inaugurated as its highest representative committee member (party leader). However, immediately following its formation, the party divided into two factions over its stance on the struggle against ratification of the Treaty on Basic Relations and the dispatch of armed forces to the Vietnam War. Thus, conflict persisted between the hardliners, centered around Yun Po-sun of the former Civil Rule Party, who called for the resignation of assembly members and the dissolution of the party; and the moderates, centered around Yu Chin-san and Park Sun-cheon of the former Democratic Party, who continued to emphasize confrontation within the National Assembly.

On 12 August, following the singing of the Treaty on Basic Relations Between Japan and the Republic of Korea on 22 June, 61 members of the People’s Party submitted their letters of resignation from the National Assembly in protest. Even so, the proposal to ratify the Treaty was ultimately passed by the National Assembly on 14 August with a single vote by the ruling Democratic Republican Party, and the members of the People’s Party, excluding a few extreme hardliners such as Yun Po-sun, returned to the National Assembly on 14 October. In opposition, this group of hardliners defected from the People’s Party and formed the New Korea Party (1966-67) on 30 March 1966, causing the opposition party to split just ten months after its unification.

The next year, in the presidential election of May 1967, the People’s Party and the New Korea Party initially nominated Yu Jin-o and Yun Po-sun as their respective presidential candidates. However, under the pretext of unifying the opposition party candidacy and promoting an integrated opposition, the People’s Party and the New Korea Party eventually came together in February 1967 to form the New Democratic Party, once again establishing a unified opposition party.
