= Kono Statement =

1993 statement about Japan's WWII past

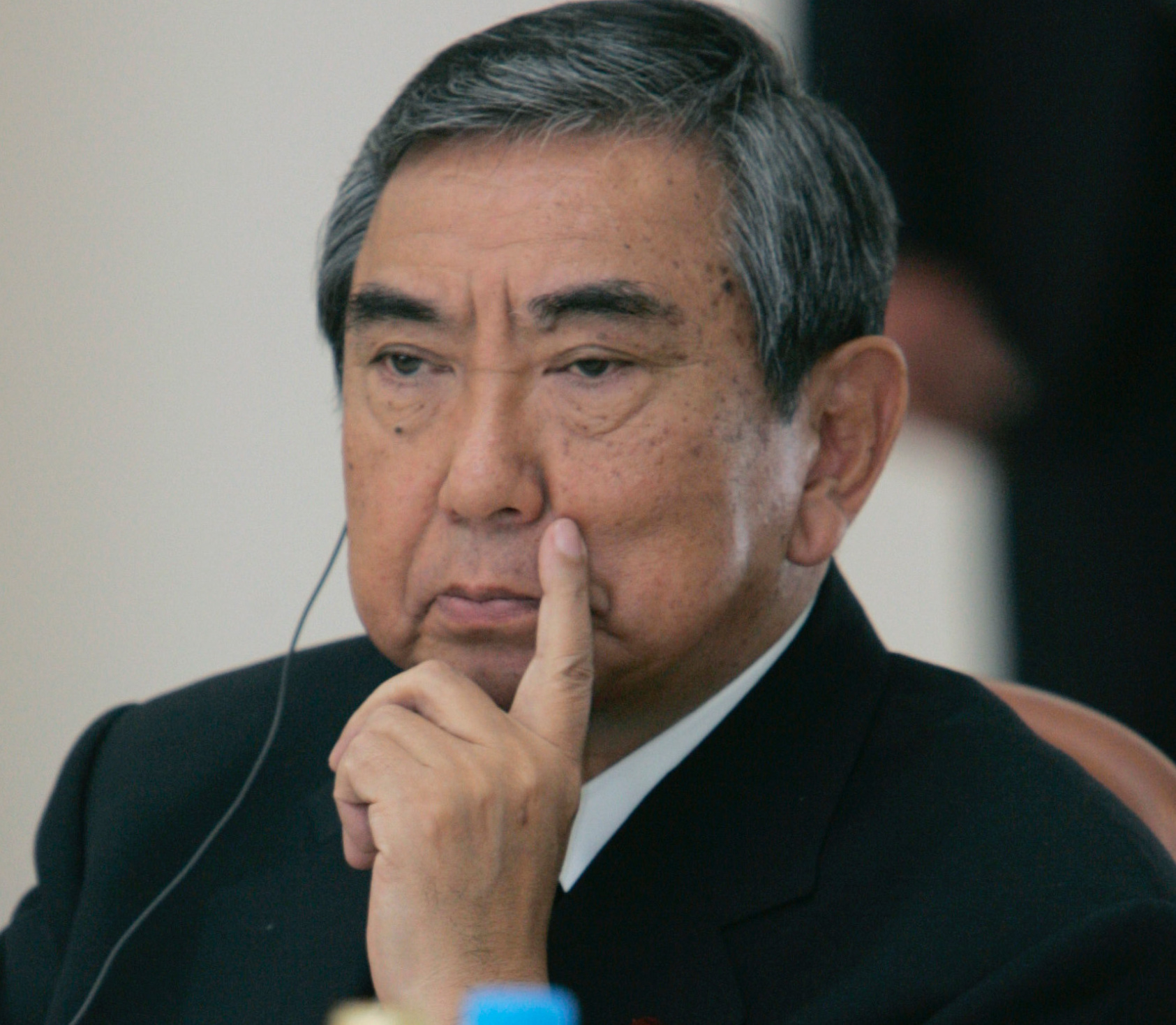
Yohei Kono

The Kono Statement refers to a statement released by Chief Cabinet Secretary Yōhei Kōno on August 4, 1993, after the conclusion of the government study that found that the Japanese Imperial Army had forced women, known as comfort women, to work in military-run brothels during World War II. The Japanese government had initially denied that the women had been coerced until this point. In the Kono Statement, the Japanese government acknowledged that:

- "The then Japanese military was, directly or indirectly, involved in the establishment and management of the comfort stations".
- "The recruitment of the comfort women was conducted mainly by private recruiters who acted in response to the request of the military."
- "In many cases they were recruited against their own will, through coaxing, coercion, etc."
- "At times, administrative/military personnel directly took part in the recruitments."
- "They lived in misery at comfort stations under a coercive atmosphere."

== Background ==
A similar statement was offered before on July 6, 1992, by Kono's predecessor Koichi Kato saying that the "Government had been involved in the establishment of comfort stations, the control of those who recruited comfort women, the construction and reinforcement of comfort facilities, the management and surveillance of comfort stations, [...]" and that the government wanted to "express its sincere apology and remorse to all those who have suffered indescribable hardship as so-called 'wartime comfort women.'"

Kono's subsequent call for historical research and education aimed at remembering the issue became the basis for addressing the subject of forced prostitution in school history textbooks. It also led to the creation of the Asian Women's Fund, which provided aid and support to women who had been forced into prostitution during the war.

On June 9, 2015, Kono stated at a press conference that there was undeniable evidence that comfort women were forcibly taken, citing Dutch women in Indonesia. He explained that although there is a misunderstanding that the Kono Statement covers only Korean Peninsula, it covers all the comfort women of the Imperial Japanese military.

== Criticism ==
The Kono Statement has been the target of criticism by some conservatives in Japan. It is still debated whether the statement acknowledged that coercion had been used in the recruitment and retention of the women by the Japanese Imperial Army directly, as the recruitment was believed to be mainly conducted by private recruiting agents (both Korean and Japanese). Former prime minister Shinzō Abe, during his first term as prime minister in 2007, stated that he did not believe women were coerced by the Japanese army into working at military brothels. Nobuo Ishihara, deputy Chief Cabinet Secretary at the time of the drafting of the Kono Statement, has stated in unsworn testimony to the National Diet that no written records verifying the accounts of the 16 women who were interviewed during the course of the investigation could be discovered. One article published in The New York Times asserts that "There is little evidence that the Japanese military abducted or was directly involved in entrapping women in Korea, which had been a Japanese colony for decades when the war began, although the women and activists who support them say the women were often deceived and forced to work against their will." However, the same article also states that, "Many were deceived with offers of jobs in factories and hospitals and then forced to provide sex for imperial soldiers in the comfort stations. In Southeast Asia, there is evidence that Japanese soldiers simply kidnapped women to work in the brothels." According to an article published by the Japanese newspaper, the Asahi Shimbun, "Prostitution agents were prevalent due to the poverty and patriarchal family system. For that reason, even if the military was not directly involved, it is said it was possible to gather many women through such methods as work-related scams and human trafficking."

Members of the ruling Liberal Democratic Party had been discussing the possibility of the government, led by Abe, looking into revising the statement when Chief Cabinet Secretary Yoshihide Suga announced that a team had been formed to reexamine the "background" of the report at House of Representatives Budget Committee on February 20, 2014. The review was criticized by the South Korean government. Abe announced in March that his government would not revise the statement. Yonhap News reported that this decision was likely influenced by pressure from the Obama administration in the United States, which was then trying to cool diplomatic tensions between Japan, China and Korea.

== Review ==
A five-member study team chaired by a former Prosecutor-General Keiichi Tadaki, including author and historian Ikuhiko Hata reviewed the Kono Statement. A report titled Details of Exchanges Between Japan and the Republic of Korea (ROK) regarding the Comfort Women Issue - From the Drafting of the Kono Statement to the Asian Women’s Fund was submitted to the Diet on June 20, 2014. In response to the review, Kono immediately issued a statement verifying the report's findings, saying that there was nothing for him to "add or subtract" and that everything in the report was correct.

=== Background ===
On February 20, 2014, Nobuo Ishihara, former Deputy Chief Cabinet Secretary at the issuance of the Kono Statement, testified:

1. No post factum corroborating investigation was conducted on the result of the hearings of former comfort women during the government study conducted for the Kono Statement.
2. There is a possibility that in the drafting process of the Kono Statement, the negotiation was conducted with South Korea.
3. Recent dispute brought up by South Korea which was once settled by Kono Statement is extremely regrettable because the good intentions of Japan at the time are ignored.

As a result, a study clarifying the process leading to the drafting of the Kono Statement and understanding what actually occurred at that time is to be conducted.

=== Coerciveness ===
"Coerciveness" is the primary focus of the negotiation. Korea insisted to include "coerciveness" at the time of recruitment so that "Korean people can accept the statement" although Japan did not find such evidence.

- Korea stated that "if the announcement by the Japanese side relied on measured expressions such as 'there was involvement of coerciveness in some cases' it would likely trigger a furor." In response, the Japanese side replied that "on the issue of 'coerciveness', based also on the findings of the inquiry conducted domestically up to then, it would not be possible to arrive at a conclusion that would distort historical facts." Deputy Chief Cabinet Secretary Ishihara stated that "it would not be possible to say unconditionally that all comfort women were recruited with 'coerciveness'."
- Japan "continuously investigated related documents and additionally conducted search and investigation of documents in the United States National Archives and Records Administration and in other locations. With these documents that were obtained in this way as a basis, it also began to analyze hearings of military-related parties and those responsible for managing the comfort stations, as well as testimonies collected by the Korean Council, and was able to practically finish compiling the report on the study results. The recognition obtained through these series of studies was that it was not possible to confirm that women were 'forcefully recruited'."
- Japan explored "expressions that demonstrate the Government of Japan’s recognition to the greatest extent possible but in a way that does not bring lingering uneasiness to the hearts of citizens of either country.”
- "Although reaching a definite recognition would be difficult with regards to the issue of the involvement of 'coerciveness'," Japan made a concession to demonstrate a degree of recognition by stating that "it cannot be denied that some elements of coerciveness also existed" or "conceivably there were also some elements of 'coerciveness'." on the basic standpoint that in order to build a future-oriented Japan-ROK relationship.

=== Hearings ===
The intention of the hearings was to show the sincere attitude of the Government of Japan by holding the hearings of the comfort women rather than a clarification of the facts, Hence the results of hearing were not compared to post-facto corroborating investigations or other testimonies. The original draft of the Kono Statement that was released immediately after the hearings had already been prepared prior to the completion of the hearings.

=== Negotiation of wording ===
Japan and South Korea negotiated the detailed wording of the Kono Statement.

- "in many cases"

Japan proposed the wording "The Government study has revealed that in many cases they were recruited against their own will,...". South Korea requested the removal of the phrase "in many cases". However Japan refused as it was difficult for it to accept that the women were recruited against their will in every case.

- "intention" or "instruction"

Japan proposed the wording "Comfort stations were operated in response to the intention of the military authorities of the day." South Korea requested this expression be changed to "instruction". However, the Japan could not accept this as it could not confirm that the military "instructed" the establishment of the comfort stations and proposed instead the expression of “request”. The resulting sentence became "Comfort stations were operated in response to the request of the military authorities of the day."

- "apologies" and "remorse"

Japan proposed the wording "The Government of Japan would like to take this opportunity once again to extend its sincere apologies ...". South Korea requested the addition of "remorse" to the wording of this expression of "apology", to which Japan agreed. The resulting sentence became "The Government of Japan would like to take this opportunity once again to extend its sincere apologies and remorse ...".

=== Compensation ===
President of South Korea Kim Young-sam expressed no plan to demand compensation from the Government of Japan, instead, South Korea will undertake compensation using the budget of the government of South Korea and accepted the Kono Statement.

- March 13, 1993, Kim Young-sam stated that “We do not plan to demand material compensation from the Government of Japan. Compensation will be undertaken using the budget of the ROK government from next year. Doing so will undoubtedly make it possible to pursue a new Japan-ROK relationship by claiming the moral high-ground."

=== Acceptance ===
- August 3, 1993, the day before the issuance of Statement, Kim Yong-sam had appreciated the final draft presented by Japan and communicated to Japan that the Government of the South Korea accepted the wording of the draft.

== See also ==
- Treaty on Basic Relations between Japan and the Republic of Korea
- War rape
- Japan–South Korea Joint Declaration of 1998
- Murayama Statement
- Nazi War Crimes and Japanese Imperial Government Records Interagency Working Group
- Diary of a Japanese Military Brothel Manager
