= Murayama Statement =

1995 Japanese statement on its imperialist history

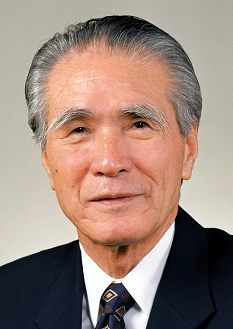
Tomiichi Murayama, who made the statement

The Murayama Statement (村山談話, Murayama Danwa) was a political statement released by Prime Minister of Japan Tomiichi Murayama on August 15, 1995, officially titled "On the Occasion of the 50th Anniversary of the War's End" (戦後50周年の終戦記念日にあたっての村山内閣総理大臣談話, Sengo 50 Shūnen no Shūsen Kinenbi Niatatte no Murayama Naikaku-sōri-daijin Danwa).

It synthesized the position of the Japanese government on historical recognition and reconciliation with Asia and other nations subjected to Japanese colonialism, primarily involving China, Korea, Singapore as well as the rest of Southeast Asia. The statement also recognized the judgements of war tribunals prescribed in Article 11 of the San Francisco Peace Treaty. In this way, the Murayama Statement played a significant role in both the reconciliation of war issues as well as the shift in both domestic and international perception of Japan.

== Background ==
=== Japanese imperialism and war crimes ===
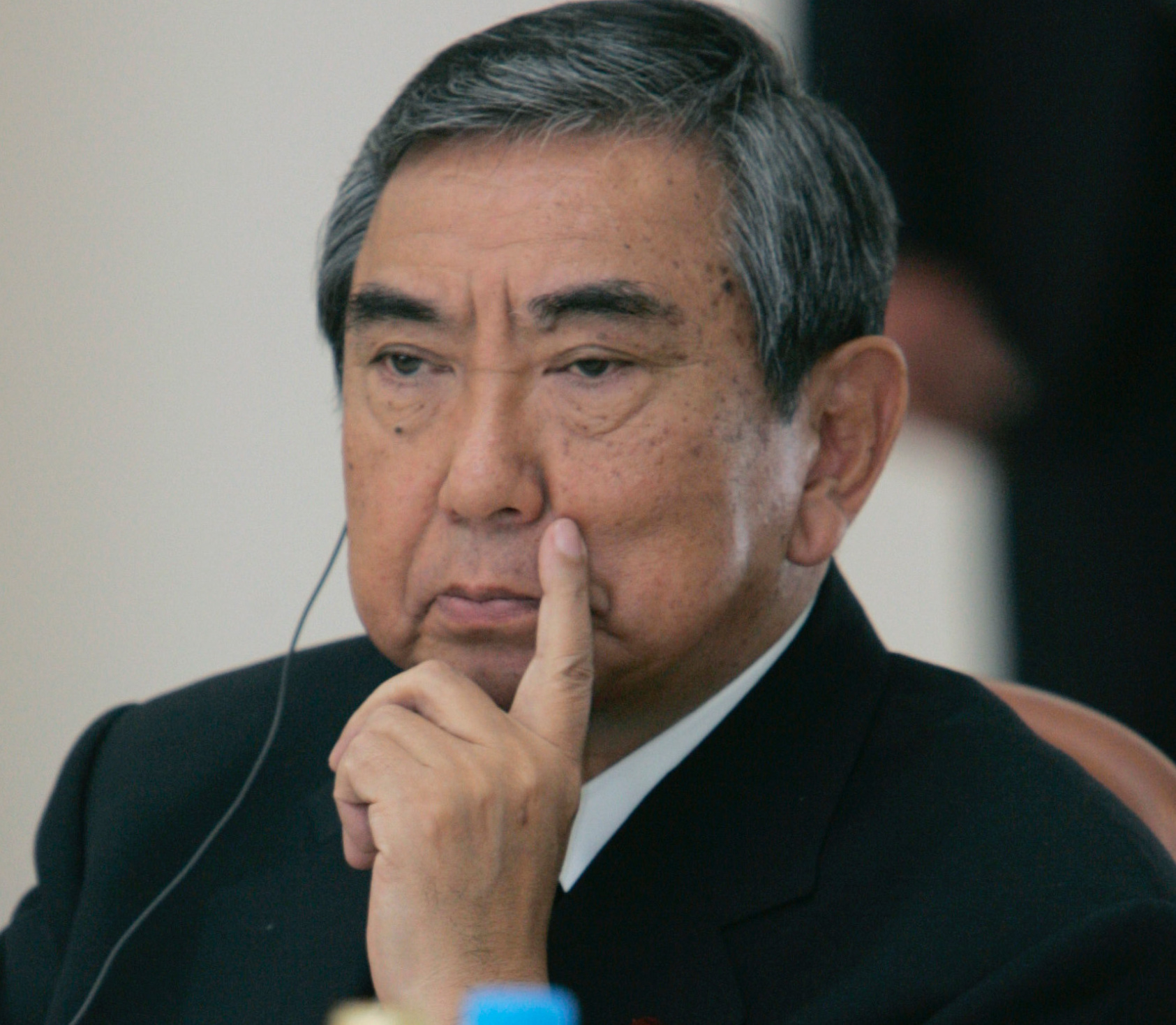
Former Chief Cabinet Secretary Yohei Kono

The Murayama statement apologizes for Japanese war crimes and atrocities committed during the period of Japanese imperialism, especially during the Second Sino-Japanese War, World War II, and the annexation of Korea. The war crimes mainly involved the Imperial Japanese Army and the Imperial Japanese Navy, responsible for the deaths of millions. Actions include a wide range including torture of prisoners of war, forced labor, biological warfare, looting, rape, and the use of comfort women. In addition, Japan's Ministry of Foreign Affairs states the country acknowledges its role in the damage caused by Japan during World War II.

=== The Kono Statement (1993) ===
Japanese governments have issued several official apologies for their war crimes and other actions during the Imperial era. The apology that most immediately preceded the Murayama Statement was the Kono Statement announced by LDP Chief Cabinet Secretary Yōhei Kōno on August 4, 1993. With this statement, Japan acknowledged for the first time that their military was directly or indirectly involved in the sexual slavery system called comfort women. The military ran brothels and used coercion to make the comfort women provide sex to the Japanese soldiers.

== Development of the statement ==
The idea of developing a formal, comprehensive apology was raised in January 1995, when the long-dominant Liberal Democratic Party of Japan (LDP) was forced to share power with the Japan Socialist Party (JSP). JSP President Murayama was given the prime ministership in the power-sharing agreement. The Lower House Speaker Takako Doi of JSP emphasized the necessity of trying to resolve Asian distrust in Japan. However, this was first met by strong opposition within the government, with many believing that Japan had already apologized sufficiently for the war, or that the renouncement of war could suggest Japan was abrogating its right to self defense.

To overcome opposition to an apology and reach a resolution, Murayama met with the secretary general of each of the three governing parties on May 25 and asked for negotiations to reach an agreement. He targeted his campaign at the younger leaders of the LDP, including Junichiro Koizumi, former minister of posts and telecommunications and a future prime minister. The leaders reportedly promised Murayama a resolution containing clear expressions of regret. The drafting of the document was a process involving much conflict over wording and expressions, for example with the LDP's rejection of unilateral incrimination of Japan against the Socialists feeling that ambiguity in the statement would greatly detract from its significance. Sakutaro Tanino, a member of the Ministry of Foreign Affairs was among those who contributed to the drafting process of the Statement. Tanino was responsible for changing the ambiguous wordings through the implementation of the word "aggression" in the statement.

When formulating the statement, Murayama chose the route of "cabinet decision", a comparatively more politically binding procedure than "cabinet understanding". Murayama expressed his wish for his statement to be interpreted as the will of the cabinet, in order to bind future cabinets. Although his statement was criticized on August 22 by the new LDP Secretary General Hiroshi Mitsuzuka as exceeding the content of the Diet solution, the incoming LDP President (and soon to be prime minister) Ryutaro Hashimoto stated his own interpretation of the war was in accordance with Murayama's statement.

== The statement ==
The English translation of the Statement is as follows:

The world has seen fifty years elapse since the war came to an end. Now, when I remember the many people both at home and abroad who fell victim to war, my heart is overwhelmed by a flood of emotions.

The peace and prosperity of today were built as Japan overcame great difficulty to arise from a devastated land after defeat in the war. That achievement is something of which we are proud, and let me herein express my heartfelt admiration for the wisdom and untiring effort of each and every one of our citizens. Let me also express once again my profound gratitude for the indispensable support and assistance extended to Japan by the countries of the world, beginning with the United States of America. I am also delighted that we have been able to build the friendly relations which we enjoy today with the neighboring countries of the Asia-Pacific region, the United States and the countries of Europe.

Now that Japan has come to enjoy peace and abundance, we tend to overlook the pricelessness and blessings of peace. Our task is to convey to younger generations the horrors of war, so that we never repeat the errors in our history. I believe that, as we join hands, especially with the peoples of neighboring countries, to ensure true peace in the Asia-Pacific region—indeed, in the entire world—it is necessary, more than anything else, that we foster relations with all countries based on deep understanding and trust. Guided by this conviction, the Government has launched the Peace, Friendship and Exchange Initiative, which consists of two parts promoting: support for historical research into relations in the modern era between Japan and the neighboring countries of Asia and elsewhere; and rapid expansion of exchanges with those countries. Furthermore, I will continue in all sincerity to do my utmost in efforts being made on the issues arisen from the war, in order to further strengthen the relations of trust between Japan and those countries.

Now, upon this historic occasion of the 50th anniversary of the war's end, we should bear in mind that we must look into the past to learn from the lessons of history, and ensure that we do not stray from the path to the peace and prosperity of human society in the future.

During a certain period in the not too distant past, Japan, following a mistaken national policy, advanced along the road to war, only to ensnare the Japanese people in a fateful crisis, and, through its colonial rule and aggression, caused tremendous damage and suffering to the people of many countries, particularly to those of Asian nations. In the hope that no such mistake be made in the future, I regard, in a spirit of humility, these irrefutable facts of history, and express here once again my feelings of deep remorse and state my heartfelt apology. Allow me also to express my feelings of profound mourning for all victims, both at home and abroad, of that history.

Building from our deep remorse on this occasion of the 50th anniversary of the end of the war, Japan must eliminate self-righteous nationalism, promote international coordination as a responsible member of the international community and, thereby, advance the principles of peace and democracy. At the same time, as the only country to have experienced the devastation of atomic bombing, Japan, with a view to the ultimate elimination of nuclear weapons, must actively strive to further global disarmament in areas such as the strengthening of the nuclear non-proliferation regime. It is my conviction that in this way alone can Japan atone for its past and lay to rest the spirits of those who perished.

It is said that one can rely on good faith. And so, at this time of remembrance, I declare to the people of Japan and abroad my intention to make good faith the foundation of our Government policy, and this is my vow.

== Reactions ==
=== Japan ===
Following the statement, Murayama answered questions from reporters. He declined to be more specific about which wartime leaders he was referring to. He clarified he was assigning responsibility to the wartime Emperor Hirohito. Murayama also reiterated government policy that all issues of compensation had been settled by various peace treaties, which was interpreted as a defeat for former comfort women, forced laborers, prisoners of war, and other victims.

The Liberal Democratic Party, part of the governing coalition, issued a statement which did not apologize or admit "aggression", instead praising Japanese "war heroes" claimed to lay the foundation for the country's peace and prosperity. The LDP quashed Murayama’s plan for a memorial for non-Japanese war victims, and seven LDP Cabinet members made unofficial visits to Yasukuni Shrine, controversial for its enshrinement of war criminals.

A contemporary poll by Nihon Keizai Shimbun found 53.5% of Japanese respondents said Japan had not done enough to atone for the war. Older respondents were more likely to say Japan had done all it could.

Some Japanese people were concerned over indiscretions such as by Education Minister Yoshinobu Shimamura, who told reporters he was unsure whether repeated apologies were useful and that Japan had not necessarily been the aggressor in the war. However, he quickly apologized and retracted his comments after meeting protests from the public population and other Asian countries.

Some feared that Murayama's apology may not necessarily hold if more conservative prime ministers followed to lead Japan. However, many were encouraged when Emperor Akihito spoke in a ritual said that marked the anniversary to reinforce Murayama's apology and expressed deep remorse for Japan's actions as well as mourning for those who suffered in the battlefield.

=== South Korea ===
The perceptions of the South Koreans grew suspicious about the credibility of the statement as the means of reconciliation were not ensured in concrete measures, neither did they feel that it was met. The Asian Women's Fund, which was created in spirit of the statement, was later rejected by South Korean comfort women and the South Korean government. They argued for direct compensation from the Japanese government. The Korean elites, additionally, required the Japanese government to declare, hence, acknowledging that there was a forced annexation in 1910. The Japanese did not comply to this demand. Therefore, South Koreans perceive inconsistency with the Japanese government. After the normalization of diplomatic relations between Japan and South Korea in 1965, Korean victims could legally not make individual claims against the Japanese government nor Japanese companies. Visits to Yasukuni Shrine by Junichiro Koizumi during his time in office (April 26, 2001 - September 26, 2006) and retracting statements by PM Shinzo Abe have continued the negative sentiments among the South Korean public.

A survey conducted by the Asian Institute for Policy Studies in 2012 shows that the South Korean public are unaware of the Murayama Statement and misunderstood it to be related to the Dokdo-Takeshima Island dispute. The study concluded that the island dispute is considered as "the biggest obstacle in mending South Korean-Japan relations".

=== China ===
Murayama was known as the first Japanese prime minister to apologize to China, and also the first to formally address Japan's actions during its colonial rule. According to Chinese media, As the "good friend (好朋友, hao peng you)" of Chinese people, Murayama's actions were praised by Asian countries, including China. Even after his resignation, Murayama has been invited to ceremonies in China to mark the 70th anniversary of the end of World War II. In a statement released by People's Daily, Murayama emphasized the two nations' linguistic and cultural similarities, insisting that China and Japan develop a strong bond.

=== Other nations ===
Although some Western nations such as Australia showed warmth and welcome towards the first explicit apology for Japan's imperialist and war time actions, other Asian countries such as Singapore and Malaysia expressed similar reactions to China and South Korea. Reactions were generally subdued compared to Western states, and not all Asian states issued official responses to the Murayama statement. However, in contrast to China and South Korea, Japan seems to have achieved a fair level of reconciliation with Taiwan and other Southeast Asian nations through the statement, that seem to have developed a "Forgive, but never forget" attitude.

== Actions by succeeding Prime Ministers of Japan ==
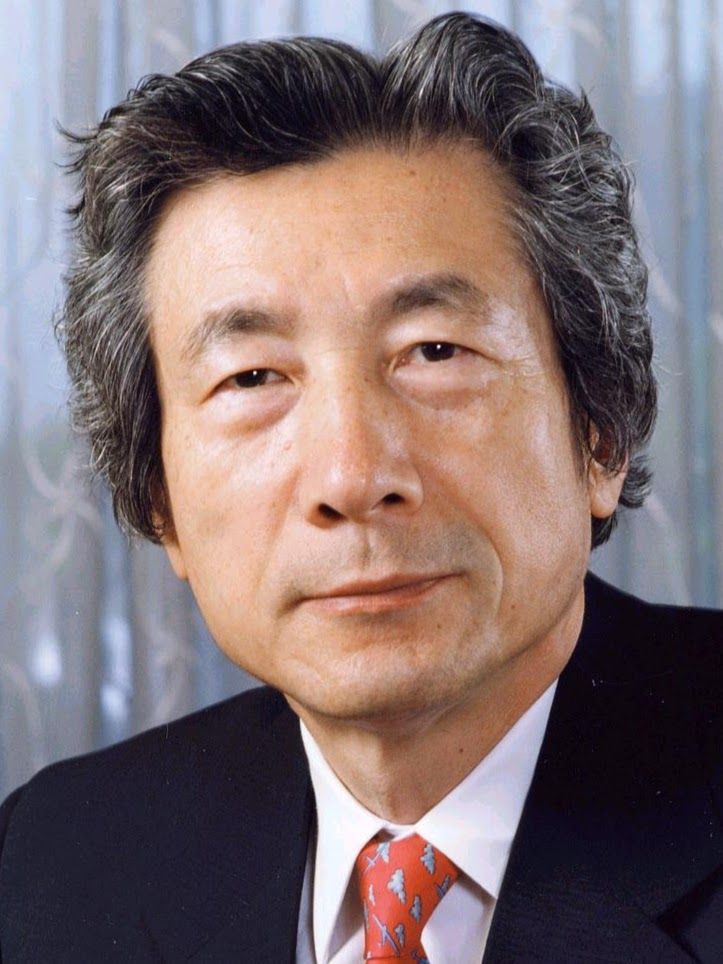
Junichiro Koizumi

=== The Koizumi Statement (2005) ===
Former PM Junichiro Koizumi issued an additional statement on August 5, 2005, regarding Japan's 20th century militarism during his time in office from 2001 to 2006. Nations such as China and South Korea repeatedly warned that attempts to avoid explicit apologies would jeopardize diplomatic ties.

In the statement he says:

[I]n the past, Japan, through its colonial rule and aggression, caused tremendous damage and suffering to the people of many countries, particularly to those of Asian nations. Sincerely facing these facts of history, I once again express my feelings of deep remorse and heartfelt apology, and also express the feelings of mourning for all victims, both at home and abroad, in the war. I am determined not to allow the lessons of that horrible war to erode, and to contribute to the peace and prosperity of the world without ever again waging a war...

Like the Murayama Statement, Koizumi explicitly employed terms such as "colonial rule", "aggression" and "deep remorse". In the context of reconciliation within the region though, Koizumi's repeated visits to the controversial Yasukuni Shrine led to a worsening of relations with Japan's neighbours. Yasukuni Shrine honors 2.5 million Japanese war dead from the period between 1868 and 1954, including fourteen convicted Class A war criminals. Visits to the Shrine by serving members of the Japanese government, even in a private capacity, have attracted significant criticism from both China and South Korea.

=== The Abe Statement (2015) ===
In the summer of 2015, PM Shinzo Abe signaled his government's position that the wording of the Murayama Statement could be altered. Doing so would require a Cabinet decision. Abe said that he planned to uphold the general content of statements made by previous Japanese cabinets. He said the upcoming statement will include three main points: an expression of remorse for Japan's wartime aggression, comments on the democratic path taken by the country over the last 70 years, and the government's plans for the future, including measures to improve regional and global prosperity.

The Murayama Statement said the country had caused "tremendous damage and suffering" to the people of Asia and other countries through its colonial rule and aggression. Abe seemed reluctant about using the same wording that appeared in the Murayama statement, saying he wanted to avoid "bits and pieces of argument over whether the previous wording was used or new wording was added". His comments on the issue drew criticism from many opposition leaders. Katsuya Okada, leader of the opposition Democratic Party of Japan, severely criticized Abe's approach, saying that the prime minister's remarks calling colonial rule and aggression 'bits and pieces' could not be tolerated, and that the original statement had already received strong international recognition.

Kenji Eda, leader of Ishin no To (Japanese Innovation Party), warned Abe against altering the wording of the Murayama statement, saying doing so would "send a different message to neighboring countries". Japanese Communist Party chairman Kazuo Shii also urged Abe to retain key aspects of the Murayama Statement and take appropriate action. In addition to this, Natsuo Yamaguchi, the leader of the junior Komeito party in Abe's LDP-led coalition, said that the form of expression used in the Murayama Statement had significant meaning, thus any new statement must be capable of sending a similar message.

Abe delivered his statement on August 14, 2015, on the 70th anniversary of Japan's defeat in World War II, causing much controversy especially in China and South Korea. The Abe Statement is based on previous statements such as the Murayama Statement. However, it also consulted the report of a panel commission created to reconsider "the history of the 20th century and Japan's role and the world order in the 21st century." The fundamental purposes of the panel and Abe statement were to design the view of 21st century, in the context of Japan's aim of reconciliation and international contributions in the 70 years since World War II.

==== Reactions ====
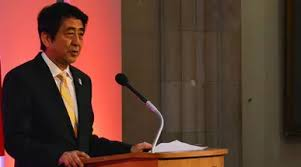
Abe's speech for Japan's role in World War II

China's state media criticized Abe's remarks as refraining from offering his own apology, this being agreed on by both the official broadcaster CCTV and Xinhua News Agency. South Korea criticized it as "disappointing", followed by comments from other Asian states as well, for example Taiwan calling on the Japanese government to examine its wartime aggression and learn the lessons of history.

Former PM Tomiichi Murayama had responded to Abe's statement, two hours after it had been announced. He had accused Abe of using words from the Murayama statement and rewording it to create a more abstract version of the statement. While Abe used words such as "aggression" in his statement, he did not mention about the specific behaviors of Japan during the war, nor did he address whom his statement was for. He stood by the statement and urged Abe to do the same.

The concern over the statement's wording was combined with the Japanese Foreign Ministry deleting a "History Issues Q&A" section on its website. The section was based on statements by Tomiichi Murayama and Junichiro Koizumi, but the section had been slightly altered when it was reinstated on the website on September 18. The new version of the Q&A is also criticized for playing down Abe's revisionist position on war related issues in order to facilitate the passage of the upcoming changes in the controversial security legislation.

== See also ==
- Japan–South Korea Joint Declaration of 1998
- Treaty on Basic Relations between Japan and South Korea
- Nanjing Massacre
- Sook Ching
