= Washington Coalition for Comfort Women Issues =

American NGO

Washington Coalition for Comfort Women Issues, Inc (WCCW) is a non-governmental organization (NGO) that advocates for the rights of wartime victims and their lawful reparation. Their mission is to contribute to the "eradication and prevention of sex crimes against women by promoting public awareness and education".

WCCW was established in December 1992 in Washington DC. by Dongwoo Lee Hahm, who retired early from the World Bank to devote full-time to the comfort women cause. It is an independent, non-profit, and non-partisan organization that emphasizes education and research. Since 1992, WCCW has specifically "dedicated itself to being the voice for 'comfort women'". The mission of the WCCW states:

Japanese government must clearly acknowledge its responsibility in perpetrating the atrocity against these Comfort Women, give official apology, provide redress from government sources, and open all government records regarding its involvement. Until these steps are taken, WCCW asserts that japan should not be permitted a permanent seat on the United Nations Security Council.

The first academic conference on comfort women issues was convened by Bonnie B.C. Oh and Margaret D. Stetz on September 30, 1996, at Georgetown University. Miki Mutsuko, the widow of Miki Takeo, former prime minister of Japan, and a humanitarian, was the keynote speaker. Miki emphasized the need for Japan to acknowledge the existence of the system and take full responsibility to meet the demands of comfort women and their supporters.

There had been several presidents, including Soh Ok-cha and Christine Choi. The current president of the WCCW, Jungsil Lee, takes a leading role in continuing to press the U.S. government and the U.S. Congress to urge the Japanese government to issue a formal apology to former comfort women. As time passes and these victims die, Junsil Lee considers it the responsibility of the WCCW to ensure that the stories of these women are remembered.

The WCCW continues to be involved in promoting art exhibitions, seminars, and films related to comfort women. The WCCW also holds an annual essay, research paper, and art competition for high school and college students, providing learning opportunities about comfort women and cash prizes to the winners.

== Activities ==
On July 30, 2007, the United States House of Representatives House Resolution 121 was passed with the sponsorship and help of Democrat Mike Honda. House Resolution 121 asks that the Japanese government formally "acknowledge, apologize, and accept historical responsibility in a clear and unequivocal manner for its Imperial Armed Forces' coercion of young women into sexual slavery, known to the world as "comfort women." After multiple attempts, this was a huge victory for the WCCW.

On May 30, 2014, the WCCW unveiled the Fairfax County's Comfort Women Memorial. The memorial consists of a granite boulder with two adjacent turquoise butterfly benches. The plaque on the boulder memorializes comfort women originating from Korea, China, Taiwan, the Philippines, Indonesia, Malaysia, Vietnam, the Netherlands, and East Timor. The butterflies represent hope and freedom from discrimination. WCCW originally approached Fairfax County regarding the memorial since it is an area where many Korean Americans live. They received permission to build it on county government grounds.

On April 28, 2015, the WCCW arranged for Yong Soo Lee (86), a surviving comfort woman, to travel to Washington DC from South Korea to speak on the eve of Japanese Prime Minister Shinzo Abe's visit to the White House. The WCCW (and other partner organizations) staged a peaceful rally in front of the White House during Prime Minister Shinzo Abe's visit. Abe made a brief comment about comfort women but continues to uphold the Kono Statement made in 1993. The WCCW continues to seek a formal apology from the Japanese government admitting that the Imperial Japanese Army was involved.

== 2017 Planned Activities ==
June 1–4, 2017. Participate in the Seventeenth Berkshire Conference on the History of Women, Genders, and Sexuality, Hofstra University, Hemstead, NY.

July 3–5, 2017. Conference in Seoul, Korea (Site, TD)

October 12–13, 2017. Queens College, Flushing, NY. Conference on Comfort Women

December 2017. The 25th anniversary conference (TD)

=== Books ===
- Schellstede, Sangmie Choi (2000). Comfort Women Speak: Testimony by Sex Slaves of the Japanese Military. New York: Holmes & Meier Publishers, Inc.

Margaret D. Stetz and Bonnie B.C. Oh, eds. (2001) Legacies of the Comfort Women of World War II. Armonk, New York and London: M.E. Sharpe.
