= Treaty on Basic Relations Between Japan and the Republic of Korea =

1965 treaty establishing basic relations

Treaty on Basic Relations between Japan and the Republic of Korea
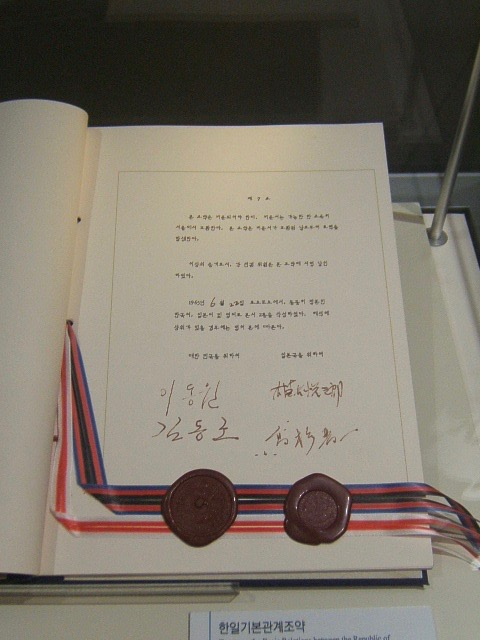
- A copy of the treaty
- Signed: June 22, 1965
- Parties: Japan; South Korea

Full text
- Treaty on Basic Relations Between Japan and the Republic of Korea at Wikisource

Japanese name
- Kanji: 日本国と大韓民国との間の基本関係に関する条約

Korean name
- Hangul: 대한민국과 일본국간의 기본관계에 관한 조약
- Hanja: 大韓民國과 日本國間의 基本關係에 關한 條約
- RR: Daehanmingukgwa Ilbongukganui gibongwangyee gwanhan joyak
- MR: Taehanmin'gukkwa Ilbon'gukkanŭi kibon'gwan'gyee kwanhan choyak

Short Korean name
- Hangul: 한일기본조약
- Hanja: 韓日基本條約
- RR: Hanilgibonjoyak
- MR: Hanilgibonjoyak

The Treaty on Basic Relations Between Japan and the Republic of Korea (Japanese: 日韓基本条約; Korean: 한일기본조약) was signed on June 22, 1965. It established basic diplomatic relations between Japan and South Korea.

== Background ==
As South Korea was not a signatory state of the Treaty of San Francisco, it was not entitled to the benefits of Article 14, which stipulated the reparations by Japan. However, by the provisions of Article 21 of that treaty, South Korea was entitled to be an authority applied to Article 4, which stated the arrangement of property and claims.

The Treaty was the fruit of the "Korea–Japan Talks," a series of bilateral talks held between South Korea and Japan from October 1951 to June 1965 to normalize diplomatic relations. Over that period of 14 years, a total of seven talks were held.

This slow progress can be at least partially attributed to the bitter history between the two nations. Issues surrounding inequalities during their long, complex relationship were often brought up when discussing how to make the treaty equitable for both sides and stalled negotiations. Additional historical animosity based on past conflicts such as the Imjin War, as well as the legacy of Japanese colonial rule, also slowed progress. Even after the treaty was passed this attitude remained, with the governments being largely ambivalent and the people of both Japan and South Korea protesting against the treaty and its provisions.

A large portion of why the treaty was finally passed on June 22, 1965, was American involvement. The United States was in the midst of The Cold War, and was allies with both The Republic of Korea and Japan. Much of East Asia had turned to communism, causing great anxiety in the State Department. This caused the foreign service to emphasize the need for their two major allies in the region to cooperate and normalize relations.

This was treated as a major concern for the East Asian and South Korean affairs departments and was a frequent topic of discussion. U.S. involvement in the negotiations of the treaty ranged from mediation, the United States sending diplomats and ambassadors to speak with officials negotiating the treaty, and even telegrams to the President of South Korea in the weeks before the treaty was signed.

In his 1974 Nobel Peace Prize lecture, Eisaku Satō explicitly mentioned the Treaty on Basic Relations between Japan and South Korea. He described "the guiding spirit of equality and mutual advantage and the realistic approach of seeking to establish friendship with close neighbors" as significant aspects of the extended negotiations which produced the bilateral agreement.

In October 2018, the Supreme Court of South Korea issued a ruling which ordered Mitsubishi Heavy to compensate the victims of forced labor. The company has not done so, with Japan arguing the matter was settled under the 1965 treaty. The Japanese Government has maintained that this ruling, along with the one made on Japan's position in relations to the Korean "comfort women" (i.e. forced sexual slavery) in January 2021, is a breach of the 1965 treaty.

== Articles ==
Article I

Diplomatic and consular relations shall be established between the High Contracting Parties. The High Contracting Parties shall exchange diplomatic envoys with the Ambassadorial rank without delay. The High Contracting Parties will also establish consulates at locations to be agreed upon by the two Governments.

Article II

It is confirmed that all treaties or agreements concluded between the Empire of Japan and the Empire of Korea on or before August 22, 1910 are already null and void.

Article III

It is confirmed that the Government of the Republic of Korea is the only lawful Government in Korea as specified in the Resolution 195 (III) of the United Nations General Assembly.

Article IV

(a) The High Contracting Parties will be guided by the principles of the Charter of the United Nations in their mutual relations.

(b) The High Contracting Parties will cooperate in conformity with the principles of the Charter of the United Nations in promoting their mutual welfare and common interests.

Article V

The High Contracting Parties will enter into negotiations at the earliest practicable date for the conclusion of treaties or agreements to place their trading, maritime and other commercial relations on a stable and friendly basis.

Article VI

The High Contracting Parties will enter into negotiations at the earliest practicable date for the conclusion of an agreement relating to civil air transport.

Article VII

The present Treaty shall be ratified. The instruments of ratification shall be exchanged at Seoul as soon as possible. The present Treaty shall enter into force as from the date on which the instruments of ratification are exchanged.

In witness whereof, the respective Plenipotentiaries have signed the present Treaty and have affixed thereto their seals.

Done in duplicate at Tokyo, this twenty-second day of June of the year one thousand nine hundred and sixty-five in the Japanese, Korean, and English languages, each text being equally authentic. In case of any divergence of interpretation, the English text shall prevail.

== Settlements ==
With the Treaty, the agreements between Japan and Korea concerning the settlement of problems in regard to property and claims and economic cooperation was also signed.

In accordance to the treaty, Japan supplied South Korea with $300 million grant paid over 10 years, $30 million per year and $200 million in low-interest loans as a 'reparation fee' The official policy of Japanese governments has been that, in regard to war-time property issues and individual claims for compensation, such issues were settled completely and finally by this agreement.

The 1965 Treaty Article I:

1. To the Republic of Korea Japan shall:

(a) Supply the products of Japan and the services of the Japanese people, the total value of which will be so much in yen as shall be equivalent to three hundred million United States dollars ($300,000,000) at present computed at one hundred and eight billion yen (¥108,000,000,000), in grants [on a non-repayable basis] within the period of ten years from the date of the entry into force of the present Agreement. The supply of such products and services in each year shall be limited to [shall be such] such amount in yen as shall be equivalent to thirty million United States dollars ($30,000,000) at present computed at ten billion eight hundred million yen (¥10,800,000,000); in case the supply of any one year falls short of the said amount, the remainder shall be added to the amounts of the supplies for the next and subsequent years. However, the ceiling on the amount of the supply for any one year can be raised [increased] by agreement between the Governments of the Contracting Parties.

(b) Extend long-term and low-interest loans up to such amount in yen as shall be equivalent to two hundred million United States dollars ($200,000,000) at present computed at seventy-two billion yen (¥72,000,000,000), which the Government of the Republic of Korea may request and which shall be used for the procurement by the Republic of Korea of the products of Japan and the services of the Japanese people necessary in implementing the projects to be determined in accordance with arrangements to be concluded under the provisions of paragraph 3 of the present Article, within the period of ten years from the date of the entry into force of the present Agreement. Such loans shall be extended by the Overseas Economic Co-operation Fund of Japan, and the Government of Japan shall take necessary measures in order that the said Fund will be able to secure the necessary funds for implementing the loans evenly each year.

The above-mentioned supply and loans should be such that will be conducive to the economic development of the Republic of Korea.

The 1965 Treaty Article II:

1 The High Contracting Parties confirm that the problems concerning property, rights, and interests of the two High Contracting Parties and their peoples (including juridical persons) and the claims between the High Contracting Parties and between their peoples, including those stipulated in Article IV(a) of the Peace Treaty with Japan signed at the city of San Francisco on September 8, 1951, have been settled completely and finally.

=== Use of loans and grants ===
The loans and grants provided to South Korea were used for the following projects. Pohang Iron and Steel Company used $88.68 million loan and $30.8 million grant, a total of $119.48 million, 44.3% of the $200 million loan.

$200M loans

Project	Expense (M$)	%
Construction of Pohang Iron and Steel Company	88.68	44.3
Construction of Soyang Dam	41.22	20.6
Bringing up small business	22.23	11.1
Improvement of railway facilities	21.16	10.6
Maritime development project	8.17	4.1
Construction of Gyeongbu Expressway	7.24	3.6
Expansion of long distance telephone service	4.19	2.1
Dredging operation	3.29	1.6
Others	3.82	1.9
Total	200.00	100.0

$300M grants

Project	Expense (M$)	%
Korea Exchange Bank: Purchase of raw material	132.82	44.2
Development of agriculture water	30.84	10.3
Construction of Pohang Iron and Steel Company	30.80	10.2
Introduction of fishing vessel	27.17	9.1
Construction of maritime training vessel	13.47	4.5
Weather forecast facilities	6.38	2.1
Power transmission and distribution facilities	3.66	1.2
Cartography of rural area	3.20	1.1
Others	51.66	17.3
Total	300.00	100.0

== Reparations ==
There has been a constant call from the South Korean public that Japan should compensate Korean individuals who suffered from Japanese colonial rule. The Japanese government has refused to do so, arguing that it settled issues on a government-to-government basis under the 1965 agreement. The South Korean government has argued that the 1965 agreement was not intended to settle individual claims against Japan for war crimes or crimes against humanity as shown by documents presented during the negotiations specifically excluding claims for personal injuries incurred by Japan's violations of international laws. The U.N. Commission on Human Rights has advocated the South Korean government's perspective by defining that the comfort women issue is a matter of human rights; the 1965 treaty only regulated property claims and not personal damages.

In January 2005, the South Korean government disclosed 1,200 pages of diplomatic documents that recorded the proceeding of the treaty. The documents, kept secret for 40 years, recorded that the Japanese government actually proposed to the South Korean government to directly compensate individual victims but it was the South Korean government which insisted that it would handle individual compensation to its citizens and then received the whole amount of grants on behalf of the victims.

The South Korean government demanded a total of $364 million in compensation for the 1.03 million Koreans conscripted into the workforce and the military during the colonial period, at a rate of 200 dollars per survivor, 1,650 dollars per death and 2,000 dollars per injured person. South Korea agreed to demand no further compensation, either at the government or individual level, after receiving $800 million in grants and soft loans from Japan as compensation for its 1910–45 colonial rule in the treaty.

Most of the funds from grants and loan were used for economic development, particularly on establishing social infrastructures, founding POSCO, building Gyeongbu Expressway and the Soyang Dam with the technology transfer from Japanese companies. Records also show 300,000 won per death was used to compensate victims of forced labor between 1975 and 1977.

== See also ==
- Asian Women's Fund
- History of Japan–Korea relations
- Japan–Korea disputes
- Japan–South Korea Joint Declaration of 1998
- Japan–South Korea trade dispute

== General and cited references ==
- Hook, Glenn D. (2001). Japan's International Relations: Politics, Economics, and Security. London: Routledge. ISBN 9780415240970; ISBN 9780415240987; OCLC 45583501.
- Lundqvist, Stig, et al. (1997). Nobel Lectures, including Presentation Speeches and Laureates' Biographies. 1971-1980. Singapore: World Scientific. ISBN 9789810207267; ISBN 978-981-02-0727-4; OCLC 186564406.
