= Asian Women's Fund =

1994–2007 Japanese fund for comfort women

- 財団法人女性のためのアジア平和国民基金
- Title page logo of the 1997 pamphlet of the Asian Women's Fund
- Formation: June 19, 1995; 31 years ago
- Founder: Bunbei Hara
- Dissolved: March 31, 2007; 19 years ago
- Website: https://awf.or.jp/
- Formerly called: Asian Peace and Friendship Fund for Women

The Asian Women's Fund (財団法人女性のためのアジア平和国民基金, zaidan hojin josei-no tame no Ajia heiwa kokumin kikin), also abbreviated to アジア女性基金 in Japanese, was a fund set up by the Japanese government in 1994 to distribute monetary compensation to comfort women in South Korea, the Philippines, Taiwan, the Netherlands, and Indonesia. Approximately ¥600 million ($5 million) was donated by the people of Japan and a total of ¥4.8 billion ($40 million) was provided by the Government of Japan. Each survivor was provided with a signed apology from the prime minister, stating "As Prime Minister of Japan, I thus extend anew my most sincere apologies and remorse to all the women who underwent immeasurable and painful experiences and suffered incurable physical and psychological wounds as comfort women." The fund was dissolved on March 31, 2007.

== Background ==
On the Japanese general election on July 18, 1993, the Liberal Democratic Party lost government for the first time since 1955. Tomiichi Murayama became Prime Minister on June 30, 1994, and in 1995 the fund, tentatively named "Josei no Tameno Ajia Heiwa Yuko Kikin (the Asian Peace and Friendship Fund for Women). As expressed by Murayama at a press conference on July 18, 1995 the government's goal was defined as following:

- to deliver two million yen (around US$18,000 depending on the exchange rate used) to each survivor-applicant as "atonement money" raised from the Japanese people, accompanied by letters of apology from the Prime Minister and the AWF president
- to implement government programs for the survivors' welfare
- to compile materials on the comfort women for the historical record
- to initiate and support activities that address contemporary issues of violence against women. The funds raised from the private sector between 1995 and 2000 have amounted to about 448 million yen, while the government is expected to expend about 700 million yen over a ten-year period in order to pay the medical and welfare expenses of individual victims. The government also grants the fund several hundred million yen each year for its operating budget.

== History ==
The fund was formally established on June 19, 1995. Bunbei Hara was the first president from 1995 to 1999. The fund was set up by the Japanese government and run with state funds, and it was under the direct supervision of the Cabinet and the Ministry of Foreign Affairs. It was a quasi public organization, but it was managed by volunteers who were private citizens. South Korea claimed that state redress was what was required, and that the fund was not state redress.

No activities in China or North Korea were funded. The Chinese and Japanese governments were unable to reach any agreement, and Japan had no regular diplomatic relations with North Korea.

On January 24, 2005, a press conference was held announcing that the fund would wrap up in March 2007 after the Indonesian projects were completed. On March 6, 2007, a press conference was held and president of the fund Tomiichi Murayama announced that the fund would dissolve on March 31, 2007.

== Results ==
Results of the project
Country	Number of recipients	Number of certified women	Atonement (Myen)	Medical and welfare support (Myen)	Total (Myen)
Korea	61^{*1}	207^{*3}	200 ($16,667)	300 ($25,000)	500 ($41,667)
Netherlands	79^{*2}	n/a^{*2}	200	300	500
Taiwan	13	36^{*3}	200	300	500
Philippines	211	n/a	200	120 ($10,000)	320 ($26,667)
Total	364	n/a	-	-	-

^*1 Other 140 women received ₩31.5 million ($26,000) as support money from the Korean government with the proviso that women sign a pledge not to receive AWF money.

^*2 Among the 109 applicants, 79 were judged to qualify as recipients of the Fund assistance by Netherland NGO. "A few women" including Jan Ruff O'Herne in an ongoing lawsuit rejected the Fund's offer.

^*3 As of 2002

=== Japanese response ===
Japan was, and still is, deeply divided over this issue. Some progressives believe that the Japanese leaders should continue to investigate the issue and offer a formal apology. Japanese right-wing conservatives objected to the fund on the basis that it was attempting to solve a "non-existent problem". The conservative Yomiuri newspaper said in an editorial in 2011 "No written material supporting the claim that government and military authorities were involved in the forcible and systematic recruitment of comfort women has been discovered", and that it regarded the fund as a failure based on a misunderstanding of history. Some conservatives have gone so far as to eliminate any mention of comfort women from history books. Some Japanese perceive the comfort women system as a "necessary evil," an inevitable part of war.

=== South Korean response ===
One of the main criticisms stated that the AWF was a private fund; South Korea claimed that state redress was what was required, and that the fund was not state redress. In a 2003 article in Pacific Affairs, anthropologist C. Sarah Soh examined the fund and responses to it within the comfort women redress debate. However, in January 1997, seven Korean survivors accepted the AWF offer, causing an outrage among leaders and fellow survivors.

=== Dutch response ===
Seventy nine women accepted the AWF offer. Some even said that they preferred AWF money over state compensation because it represented "Japanese people who wanted to express their regret to war victims while the latter would be money that was forcibly generated from an unwilling government". Some women who filed the lawsuit rejected the AW offer. The first Dutch woman to come forward, Jan Ruff O'Herne, opposed to the AWF at the urging of the Korean Council.

=== Filipina response ===
Maria Rosa Henson, the first Filipina to come forward with her story, was among the first to accept the AWF offer. She and two other women accepted the AWF money and letter of apology in August 1996. It is estimated that a hundred Filipina women have been recipients of the AWF offer.

== Financial payments ==
- ¥565m ($4.7m) was raised in donations from the Japanese people, and given to 285 comfort women from Korea, Taiwan and the Philippines, each of whom received about 2m yen ($16,700)
- ¥770m ($6.5m) in taxpayers' money was provided to pay for medical fees for these women, and for 79 other women from the Netherlands
- ¥370 million ($3.1m) was spent building medical facilities and old peoples' homes in Indonesia, rather than compensating individuals there, and the rest was used for the fund's running costs and other smaller projects.

== See also ==
- Foundation "Remembrance, Responsibility and Future"
- Japan–South Korea Comfort Women Agreement
