= Agnivesh =

Indian Marxist social activist and politician (1939–2020)

Swami Agnivesh
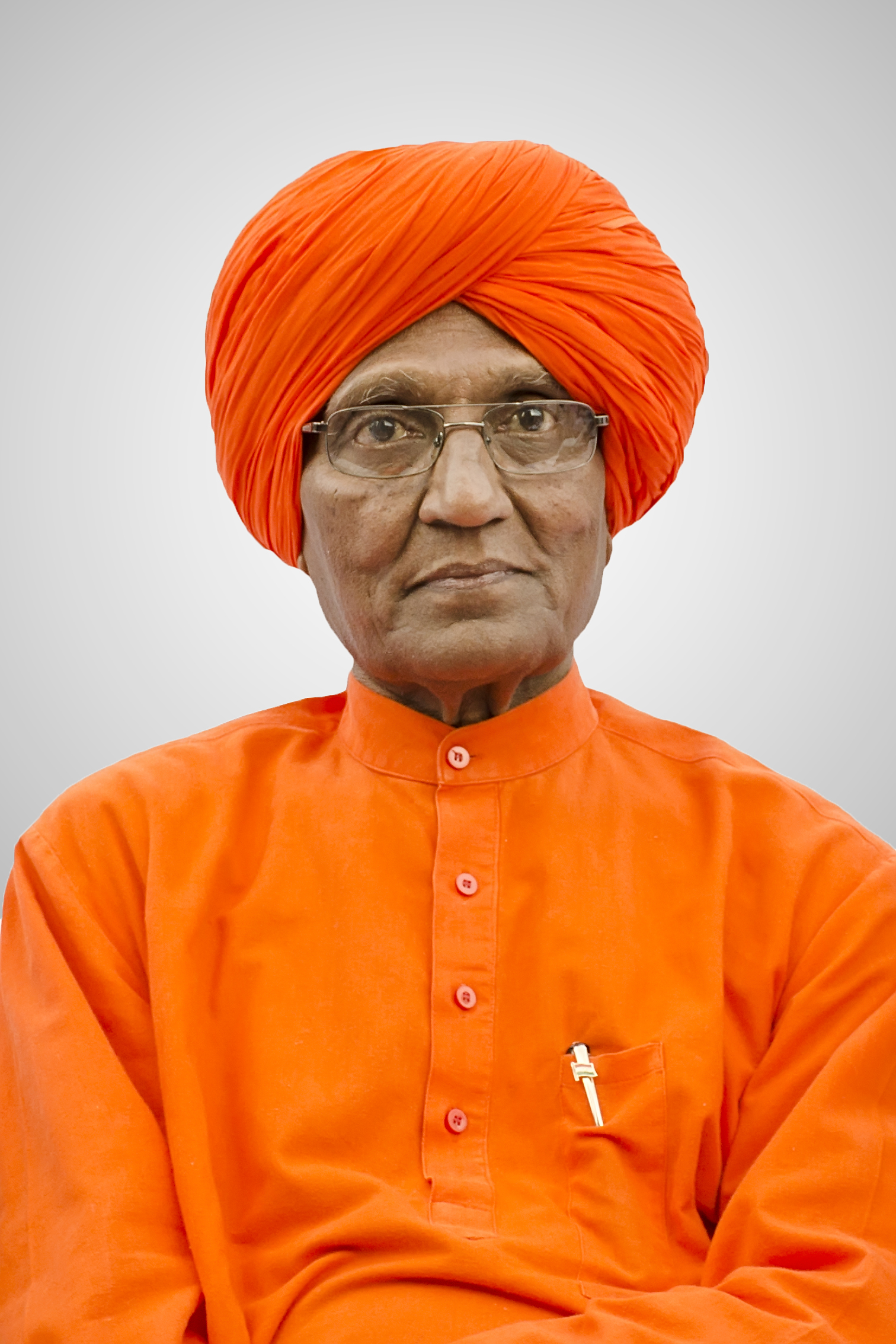
- Agnivesh in 2019
- Born: Vepa Shyam Rao; 21 September 1939; Srikakulam, Madras Presidency, British India
- Died: 11 September 2020 (aged 80); New Delhi, India
- Occupations: Social worker, scholar, politician
- Political party: Arya Sabha
- Awards: Right Livelihood Award

Swami Agnivesh (born Vepa Shyam Rao; 21 September 1939 – 11 September 2020), was an Indian social activist and the founder of Arya Sabha, a political party based on the principles of Arya Samaj. He also served as a cabinet minister in the state of Haryana. He is best known for his work against bonded labour through the Bonded Labour Liberation Front, which he founded in 1981.

He was a founder of the World Council of Arya Samaj, an organisation distinct from Dayanand's Arya Samaj, and served as its president from 2004 to 2014. He had also served as the chairperson of the United Nations Voluntary Trust Fund on Contemporary Forms of Slavery from 1994 to 2004.

== Early life ==
Agnivesh was born in a Brahmin Hindu family as Vepa Shyam Rao on 21 September 1939, in Srikakulam, Andhra Pradesh. His father died when he was only four years old. He was then brought up by his maternal grandfather, who was the Diwan of the princely state Sakti, in present-day Chhattisgarh.

He studied Law and Commerce, and then became a lecturer in management at the St Xavier's College in Kolkata. For a while, he practiced law as a junior to Sabyasachi Mukherji, who later became the Chief Justice of India.

== Politics ==
In 1970, Agnivesh founded Arya Sabha, a political party based on the principles of Arya Samaj. He became a member of the Legislative Assembly of Haryana in 1977, and served as a cabinet Minister for Education in 1979. In 1981, while still a minister, he founded the Bonded Labour Liberation Front, which continues to raise issues surrounding bonded labour in India, especially in the quarries in and around Delhi; he remained the chairperson of the organisation. After leaving the Ministry, he was arrested twice, spending a total of 14 months in jail on charges of subversion and murder, of which he was later acquitted.

Agnivesh played a role in negotiations with Indian Maoists in 2011, when he, along with civil liberties activists Kavita Srivastava, Rajinder Sachar, Gautam Navlakha, Manu Singh and Harish Dhawan helped free five abducted policemen in February. In March 2011, Maoist forces killed three members of the Chhattisgarh security and police forces; subsequently, the security forces allegedly attacked and burned an alleged Maoist village. When Swami Agnivesh and his organisation attempted to bring relief aid to families in the affected village, they were met by a large group of demonstrators who attacked their cars with stones, claiming that the Maoists were responsible for the deaths of many security force personnel over the last year. He was also known to have urged the then prime minister, Manmohan Singh, in 2013 to initiate a dialogue with the Naxalites.

Agnivesh took part in the 2011 anti-corruption protests in India in August of that year. He would later break away from the main group of protesters, claiming that certain protesters had humiliated and conspired against him for political reasons. A video purporting to show Swami Agnivesh suggesting that the government should deal more firmly with protesters, was circulated in the Indian media and via the internet.

== Social activism ==
2009 interview with Agnivesh in Goa (Courtesy: Frederick Noronha)

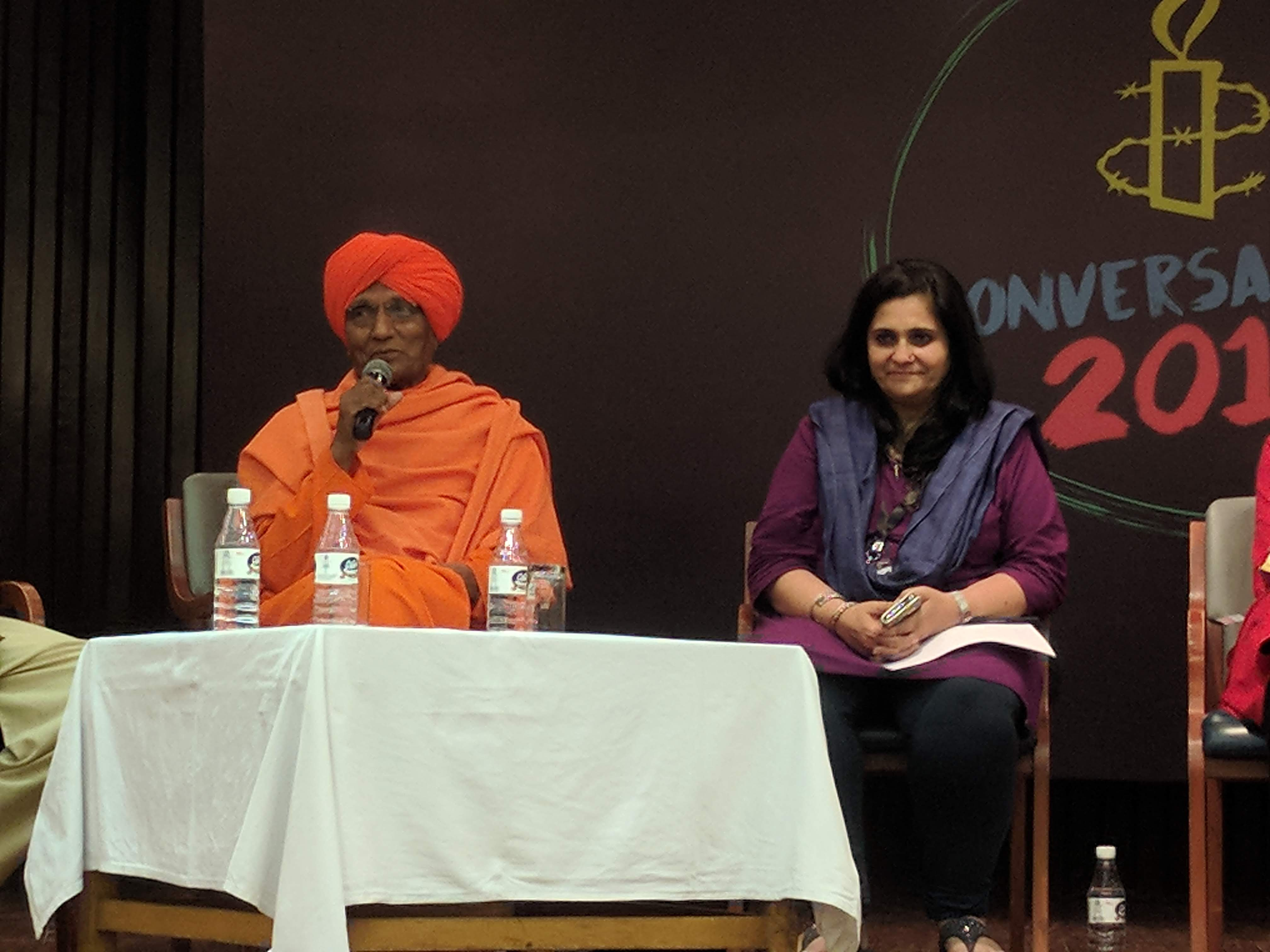
Agnivesh (left) at an Amnesty International event in New Delhi with Teesta Setalvad.

Agnivesh testified before the Working Group on Contemporary Forms of Slavery at the United Nations Human Rights Commission in Geneva. Later, he created a new task for the emancipation of womanhood, which was a helpful factor in the Commission of Sati (prevention) Act of 1987.

In 2005, Agnivesh was part of a two-week campaign against female foeticide that travelled across India.

Agnivesh argued at a conference on economic development and religion sponsored by the World Bank that people should be allowed full freedom of movement across borders through the elimination of all passports and immigration laws.

Agnivesh joined the Arya Samaj in 1968 and took the vow of sannyasa in 1970. Even though he was expelled by Arya Samaj in 1976, he continued to claim fidelity to the ideas of the organisation. Arya Samaj said in 2008, that 17 of the 19 Arya Samaj Pratinidhi Sabhas in India had expressed opposition to him. According to the Sarvadeshik Arya Pratinidhi Sabha, Agnivesh had been voted out of the Arya Samaj but he claimed that it had not affected his activities within the Arya Samaj.

In 1981, he founded the Bandhua Mukti Morcha (BMM), a non-governmental organisation working to end bonded labour. The BMM freed many people from quarries, brick kilns and carpet-weaving units. Many of these were children at the time.

In 2008, he addressed a large gathering at the Anti-Terrorism Global Peace Conference, at Ramlila Grounds, organised by Jamiat Ulema-e-Hind and several Islamic organisations, where he stated, "It is wrong to attribute the wrongdoings of a few individuals to the whole community." He also supported the demand by Jamiat Ulema-e-Hind to ban the singing of Vande Mataram by Muslim citizens of India. He also said, "I would not mince words to say that the United States is the terrorist number one. To defame the Koran and Islam is the worst form of terrorism. Islam stands for peace and brotherhood and there cannot be a bigger lie than saying that Muslims are terrorists."

Agnivesh was a proponent of interfaith dialogue and was a member of the Board of World Leaders for the Elijah Interfaith Institute. He was also a board member of the KAICIID Dialogue Centre established in Vienna in 2012 by King Abdullah of Saudi Arabia, together with the governments of Austria and Spain. In 2015, he opposed Government's plan for a separate settlement for Kashmiri Pandits as part of their rehabilitation in the valley.

Agnivesh advocated the rights of marginalised people in society and went to Pakur district of Jharkhand to address a rally of farmers and tribal members. During this event, allegedly a right wing mob attacked him and he escaped from lynching somehow with help of local people.

He led the 'Raj Bhawan Chalo' march (English: march to Governatorial house) on the death anniversary of journalist Gauri Lankesh in September 2018. He was also a participant in the Indian reality television show, Bigg Boss, as a house guest, in November 2011.

== Criticism ==
In 2005, Agnivesh stated that the Puri Jagannath Temple should be opened to non-Hindus; this led to the priests of the temple condemning his remarks as "purely anti-Hindu in nature" and burning his effigy. In May 2011, hundreds of Hindu priests protested against Agnivesh's claim that an ice stalagmite in Amarnath that they believe resembles Lord Shiva is just a piece of ice; during the protest the priests burnt his effigy. According to The Kashmir Observer, the Akhil Bharatiya Hindu Mahasabha, a Hindu nationalist organization, offered a 2 million bounty for killing Agnivesh, for apparently negative statements he made about Kashmir and Baba Amarnath. On 8 November 2011, the Supreme Court condemned Agnivesh for hurting the sentiments of Hindu People by commenting on the Amarnath Pilgrimage. The apex court bench of Justice H. L. Dattu and Justice C. K. Prasad told Agnivesh that he should weigh his words "many a time before uttering them lest it hurts the sentiments of the people".

On 17 July 2018, Agnivesh was attacked in Jharkhand by a mob allegedly consisting of BJP workers, when he was there to attend the 195th Damin Mahotsav at Littipara. His assailants accused him of being sympathetic to Christian missionaries, and "against Hindus".

== Death ==
Agnivesh died on 11 September 2020 at 6:30 pm at the Institute of Liver and Biliary Sciences, in New Delhi, at the age of 80, due to multiple organ failure. He had liver cirrhosis and had been on ventilator support for two months. His funeral was attended by many who were freed from bonded labour by his work, several of whom were children at the time.

== Accolades ==
- Rajiv Gandhi National Sadbhavana Award (2004) – Delhi, India (Religious and Communal Harmony Award 2004)
- Right Livelihood Award (2004) – Sweden
- M. A. Thomas National Rights Award (2006) – Bangalore, India

== Works ==
=== Books ===
- Vaidik Samaajvad – Vedic Socialism (Hindi), 1974
- Religion Revolution and Marxism (Hindi and English)
- Harvest of Hate: Gujarat Under Siege, with Valson Thampu. Rupa & Co, India. 2002. ISBN 81-7167-858-0
- Religion, Spirituality and Social Action New Agenda for Humanity: New Agenda for Humanity, Hope India Publications, 2003. ISBN 81-7871-000-5
- Hinduism in the New Age, Hope India Publications, 2005. ISBN 81-7871-047-1

=== Magazines ===
- Rajdharma (fortnightly) – Chief editor (1968–1978)
- Kranti Dharmi (monthly) – Chief editor (1989–1991)
