= Ehsan Ullah Khan =

Pakistani trade unionist (born 1947)

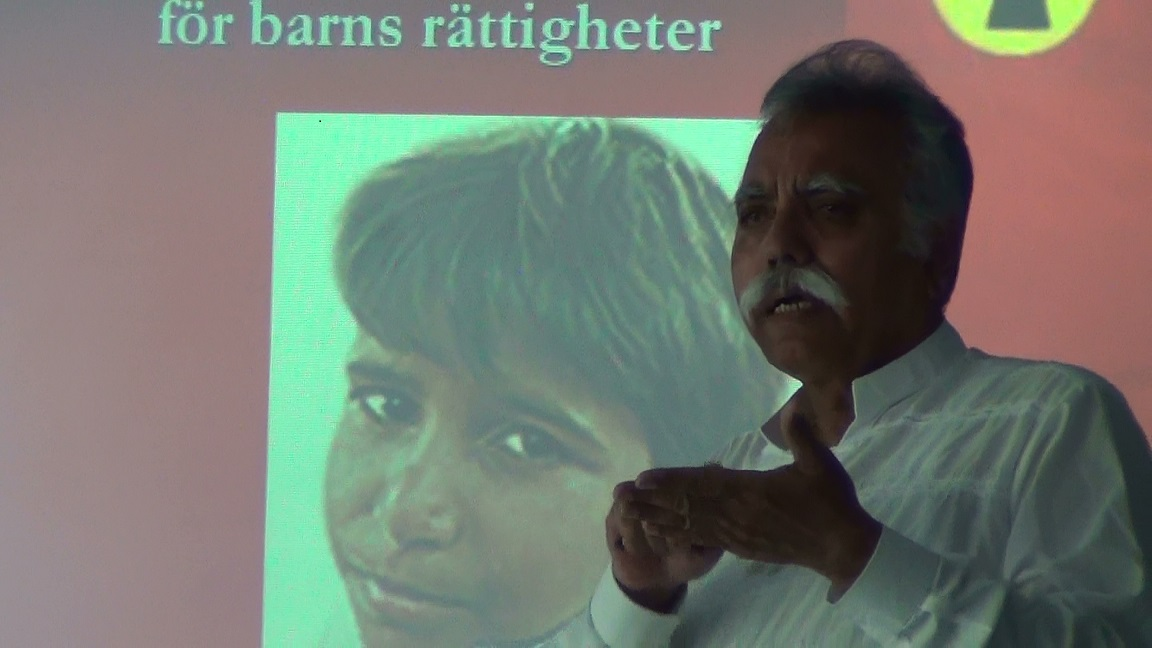
- Ehsan giving a speech in a high school in Sweden
- Born: Muhammad Ehsan Ullah Khan; February 9, 1947 (age 79); Gwadar, Baluchistan
- Citizenship: Pakistan
- Education: Journalism
- Alma mater: Punjab University
- Occupation: Human rights activist
- Organizations: Bonded Labour Liberation Front Global; Brick Kiln Workers Front; Global March

Muhammad Ehsan Ullah Khan is a Pakistani activist, trade unionist, and the founder of the Bonded Labour Liberation Front (BLLF), an organization that has freed more than 100,000 slaves in the country.

Khan was the founder and president of the Brick Kiln Workers Front and BLLF Global, a human rights organization that opposes slavery and child slavery in Pakistan and South Asia. He is the national coordinator of Global March in Sweden.

In 1992, he freed Iqbal Masih, who was working in the carpet industry. On April 16, 1995, Iqbal was assassinated. His death raised awareness of the work of campaigners against forced child labor.

He raised issues of slavery at the United Nations, through the Working Group on Contemporary Forms of Slavery, and at the International Labour Organization (ILO).

== Biography ==
Ehsan Ullah Khan was born in Gwadar, Balochistan on February 9, 1947. He studied journalism at Punjab University, in Lahore. As a young journalist, he met a man called Babba Kaala, whose daughters were kidnapped by the owner of a brick kiln on the pretext of not receiving the monthly installment on a debt their father had incurred. Moved by this story, Ehsan Ullah Khan's writing on the subject helped free Babba Kaala's daughters, and prompted brick kiln workers to rebel against slavery.

== Foundation of Bhatta Mazdoor Mahaz ==
In September 1967, he formed Bhatta Mazdoor Mahaz (BMM). The BMM was not only organizing actions and demonstrations of different kinds against the bonded system of labor, but also providing legal aid to give basic human rights to the bonded workers at the brick kilns for the first time in the history of South Asia. During 1967 forced labor was common among many other groups, like agriculture, carpet making, and mine workers.

In 1987, he mobilized some workers to present their cause to the Pakistani Supreme Court. In 1988, the court acknowledged the existence of debt bondage in the industry and declared that brickmakers could get a civil-court ruling in order to leave their workplaces.

== Iqbal Masih's liberation ==
The BLLF freed Iqbal Masih from slavery, as well as other 40,000 children in Pakistan, and Khan put the fight against child slavery up for discussion once slavery had been abolished in Pakistan, twenty years after he had started his abolitionist struggle.

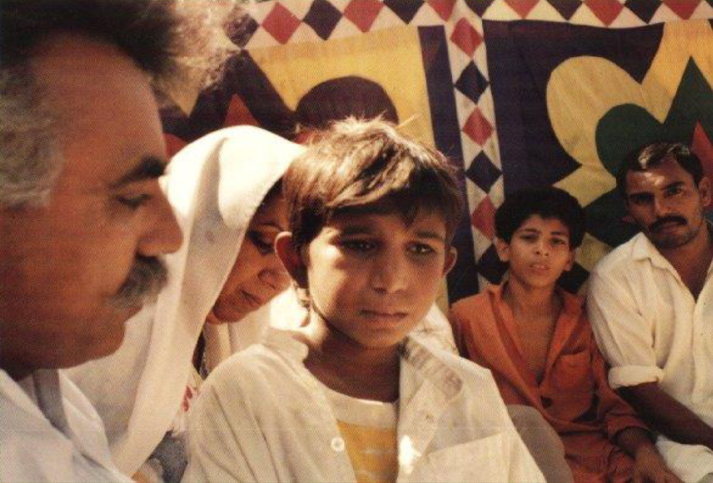
When Ehsan met Iqbal Masih, the boy was shy and afraid, but Khan realized he had many things to tell.

Khan's narrative on 'Violence' is very strong, he was a very firm believer of non-violence. The importance of the role of children is emphasized in his development strategy, which is that "the victims should be empowered."

Khan used to say that "children, who get a basic education, knowledge about their rights, and hope for their future, will themselves eliminate the slavery."

== Imprisonment and torture ==
While working as a journalist, Khan was arrested many times due to his activities for human rights and freedom of the press. In 1982 he was jailed for six months and confined in a cell at Lahore Fort during Zia ul Haq's dictatorship from 1978 to 1988. He was arrested and tortured after writing an article about the genetic development of biological warfare germs in a government-controlled laboratory in Lahore. Because of the torture, he lost almost all of his hearing from one ear. In an article, he denounced how bonded brick kiln workers had been used as guinea pigs and died due to experiments in a secret research project. The charge against him was high treason, which is punishable by life imprisonment or death.

In December 1994, he accompanied Iqbal to the United States to receive an International Award in Boston, Massachusetts. They visited Broad Meadows Middle School in Quincy, where after Iqbal's murder, some students started a campaign to raise money for a school in Pakistan, that opened in February 1997 with the support of tens of thousands of children from all 50 states of the United States.

== Exile ==
Khan has been in exile in Europe since April 16, 1995, after the murder of Iqbal Masih. Within this period, he founded BLLF Global in 1996, to fight against slavery and child slavery all over the world. He intends to return to Pakistan and continue his work with his organization. He applies for a visa every year at the embassy, but is repeatedly denied. The sedition case was quashed in Lahore High Court on November 28, 2001, when the judge declared that the case was unlawful and the allegation was false. However, the Pakistani government still does not allow him to return to Pakistan.

As Kailash Satyarthi, Nobel Peace Prize laureate of 2014, said about Ullah Khan, on May 7, 2015:

"Iqbal Masih was a martyr of child slavery but the man by my side is a martyr himself. No one fighting for children's rights has suffered as much as he has. Ehsan is the only person exiled from his country for his struggle against child slavery. He sacrificed everything for the cause: his family, his profession, his friends and his network of schools all over Pakistan. He has been in jail 12 times and has been tortured several times, which caused him slight deafness. His government accused him of high treason and condemned him to the death penalty for denouncing that in his country there were children working for foreign companies."

"I am proud to have so many good friends; some of them are just like family members. Ranging from Ehsan Ullah Khan, a pioneer in the history of the movement against bonded labor and child labor in Pakistan."

In May 2014 he attended the First International Congress on Combating Unemployment, Exploitation and Slavery, organized by the SAIn political Party (Solidarity, Self-Management and Internationalism) in Spain. The Congress Breaking Chains brought together for four days activists from several organizations that promote the fight against injustice from non-violence. The Congress hosted more than 220 congressmen coming from different parts of Spain and with speakers from four continents. Experiences as Ekta Parishad in India, the Foundation La Alameda in Argentina or the Bonded Labour Liberation Front in Pakistan were very present. During this time in Spain he appeared in several media as an interview at the Cadena SER of Santiago de Compostela. Hoy por hoy, another one to the rtvg -galician television- or at the local TV, Santiago TeVe. He also visited many schools as IES Antón Fraguas, La Salle de Santiago and the Parroquia mártires de Uganda, at the barrio Milagrosa in Pamplona.

He asked to have a meeting with the owner of INDITEX and he had an encounter with Aleix González and Indalecio Pérez from CSR (Corporate Social Responsibility) of the enterprise.

April 2016 Ehsan had a great presence in the Canary Islands. He gave speeches in many High Schools (Instituto de Jimanar, Instituto La Rocha, Instituto Santa Brígida, Instituto Tomás Morales). Antonio Morales, Gran Canary Cabildo President, held a reception to Ehsan Ullah Khan, at the Cabildo Headquarters. Carmen Hernández, Telde Mayor; The Society of mayors of the North of Gran Canariaheld; Dunia González, Mayor of Santa Lucía held him receptions and also, an Iqbal Masih tribute act with students from the Telde High Schools, at the San Juan park next to the Iqbal Masih monument.

He participated at the ESPAL (Encuentro de Solidaridad con los Pueblos de África y Latinoamérica -Latin América and Africa People Solidarity Meeting-) activities.

On April 7, 2017, he had a meeting with Martiño Noriega Sánchez, mayor of Santiago de Compostela, to discuss how to deal with what he viewed as a society with an exploitative economic system. While in Santiago, he also participated in a three-day workshop on documentary production and non violent action focused on fighting exploitation in the garment industry.

He had a meeting in May 2018 with Vitoria's Bishop, Juan Carlos Elizalde, who wrote him a recommendation letter to other Bishops, in order to open their Dioceses to his testimony.

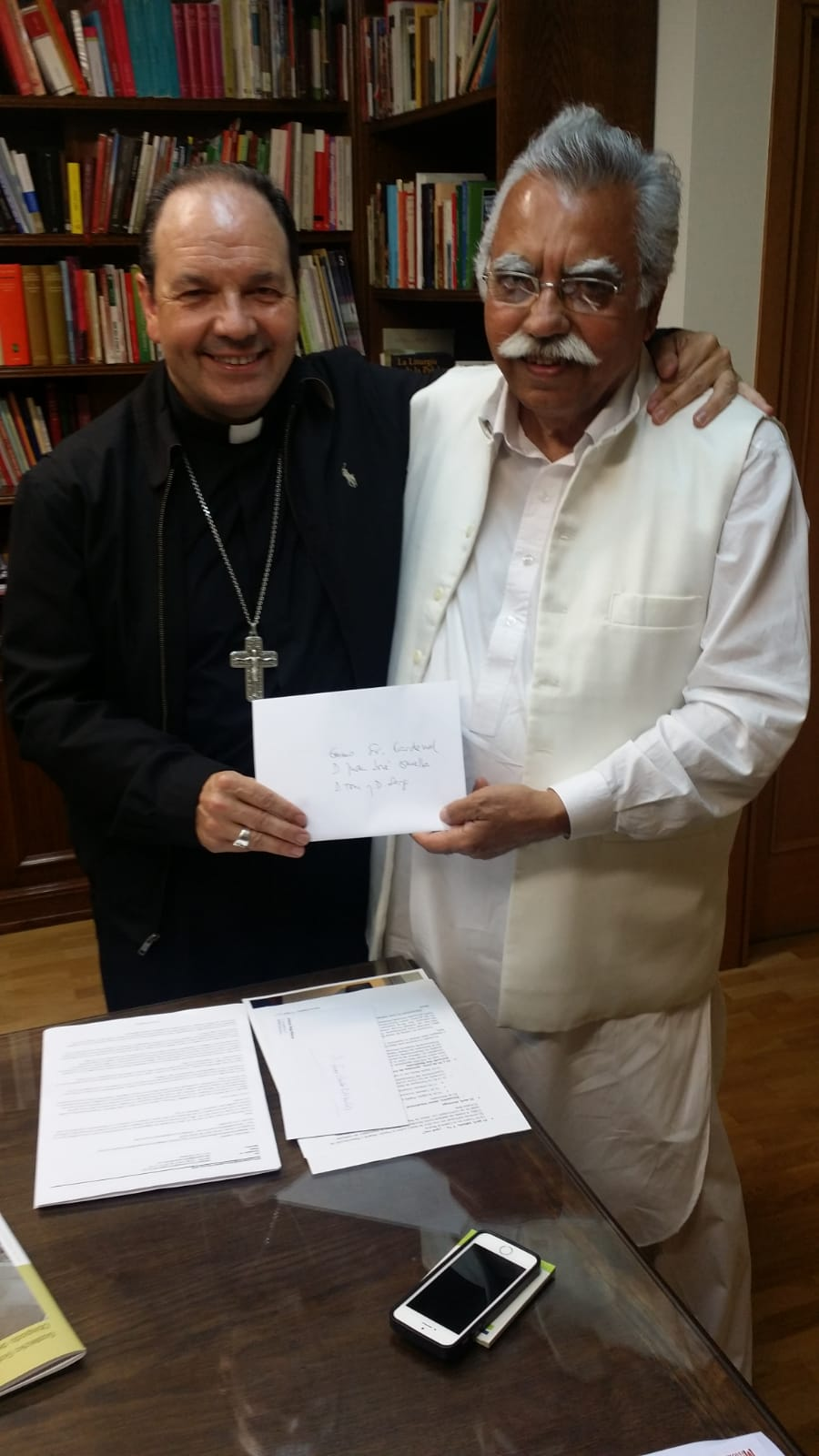

On April 16, 2018, the vice-rector for Academic Policy and Social Participation, Enrique Cabero, at the Rectorate of the University of Salamanca received Ehsan Ullah Khan for the commemoration of Child Slavery Day.

On June 12, 2019, he was interviewed on Spanish Radio and Television (RTVE).
