= Jayamma Bandari =

Indian sex worker turned social worker 1978-

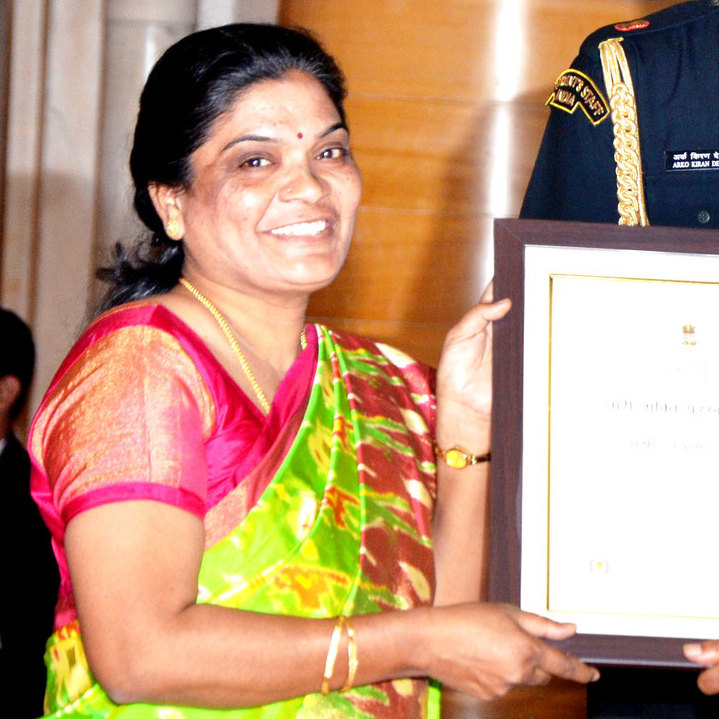
- Born: c. 1978; Nalgonda, Telangana, India
- Known for: helping sex workers in Hyderabad
- Spouse: yes
- Children: daughter

Jayamma Bandari (born c. 1978) is an Indian former sex worker turned social worker. In 2018 she was awarded the Nari Shakti Puraskar. In 2011 she founded an organisation which supports sex workers and their children with choices.

== Early life ==
Bandari was born in Nalgonda in about 1978. She became an orphan when she was three and an uncle became her guardian. He tried to marry her off when she was fourteen and even tried to marry her to a man who was already married.

Her alcoholic husband persuaded her to become a sex worker.

== Work ==
In 2001 she founded the organisation Chaitanya Mahila Mandali in Hyderabad with assistance of Jaya Singh Thomas. The organisation provides support to sex workers who want to escape their profession. The organisation provides assistance and it cares for the daughters of sex workers in order that they can avoid following their parents. 3,500 children have been rescued and a thousand women have found new work. The children are checked up on regularly after they are enrolled in state schools by her organisation.

== Awards ==
In 2014 the Vigil India Movement gave her the M A Thomas National Human Rights Award. The Confederation of Indian Industry awarded her with one of three Women Exemplar awards in 2017. The other awards were for entrepreneur Kamal Kumbhar and Monika Majumdar of West Bengal. The awards were made by Pranab Mukherjee, the President of India with CII Presidents Naushad Forbes and Shobana Kamineni in support. In 2018 Bandari was awarded the Nari Shakti Puraskar on 8 March (International Women's Day). The award was made by President Kovind at the Presidential Palace (Rastrapati Bhavan) in New Delhi with the Prime Minister of India, Narendra Modi also attending. Thirty-nine people or organisations were honoured that year. They received the award and a prize of $R 100,000.
