= Iqbal Masih =

Pakistani activist (1983–1995)

- اقبال مسیح
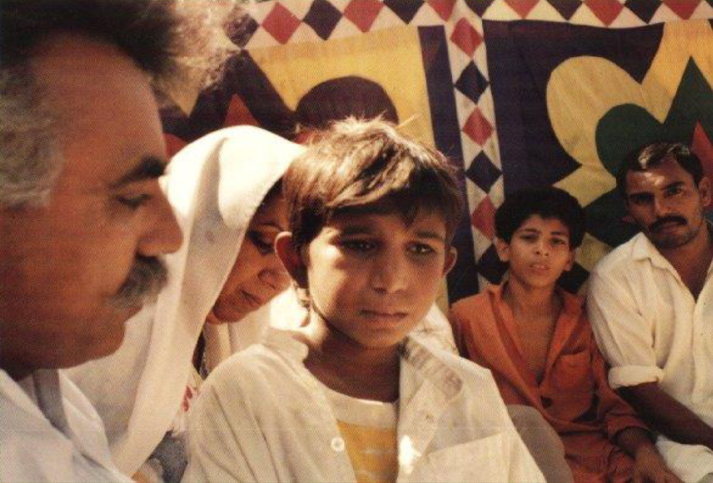
- Masih with Bonded Labour Liberation Front activist Ehsan Ullah Khan in Sheikhupura (1992)
- Born: 1 January 1983; Muridke, Punjab, Pakistan
- Died: 16 April 1995 (aged 12); Muridke, Punjab, Pakistan
- Cause of death: Assassination (gunshot wounds)
- Organization: Bonded Labour Liberation Front (BLLF)
- Known for: Activism against child labour in Pakistan
- Awards: Reebok Human Rights Award (1994); World's Children's Prize for the Rights of the Child (2000, posthumous); Tamgha-e-Shujaat by the Government of Pakistan (2022, posthumous).

Iqbal Masih (Note: Punjabi/Urdu: اقبال مسیح) (1 January 1983 – 16 April 1995) was a Pakistani Christian child labourer and activist who was a member of the Bonded Labour Liberation Front (BLLF) in Pakistan, campaigning against abusive child labour in the country. He was assassinated on Easter Sunday, 16 April 1995, at the age of 12, and was posthumously awarded the Tamgha-e-Shujaat by the government of Pakistan.

== Family background and bonded labour ==
Iqbal Masih was born on 1 January 1983 in Muridke, Punjab, Pakistan, into a poor Punjabi Catholic family. His parents were Saif Masih, a labourer, and Inayat Bibi, who worked as a house cleaner. Saif later abandoned the family, leaving Inayat to work and Iqbal's older sisters to take care of him and his siblings.

In 1986, Saif Masih was to marry off one of his sons but he lacked savings and was unable to finance this: banks would not provide loans while government aid programs were few. He took a loan of 600 rupees from a thekedar (carpet factory owner), using the only collateral he had, his children. The loan was to be paid off by four-year-old Iqbal's labor, and included undisclosed interest and expenses, an institution known as peshgi. Due to the illegality of selling children, the transaction was informal, allowing the loaner to add arbitrary expenses to the loan without oversight.

Expenses were to include the cost of a year of training (during which Iqbal would not be paid), tools, food and fines for any mistakes Iqbal was to make. He was paid 1 rupee a day. Due to the high interest rate at which the loan was taken, it stood at 13,000 rupees prior to his escape.

At the carpet maker's, Iqbal was chained to a loom and made to work as much as 14 hours a day. He was fed little and beaten, more than other children because of his attempts at escaping and refusal to work. These conditions stunted his growth; he had the height and weight of a 6-year-old when he was 12.

Explaining the background behind bonded labourers in Pakistan, American professor C. Christine Fair states that "Large numbers of Christians in the Punjab and Sindh, in particular, are trapped in bonded labour or slavery in work like brick kilns and carpet-weaving. Around 80% of brick kiln workers in some areas are Christians working to pay off family debts long since paid in absolute terms, yet who are illiterate and remain powerless to do anything about their circumstances. The plight of Pakistan's bonded labourers came to international attention briefly with the murder of 12-year-old Christian Iqbal Masih in 1995".

== Escape and activism ==
At the age of 10, Iqbal escaped his slavery, after learning that bonded labour had been declared illegal by the Supreme Court of Pakistan. He escaped and attempted to report his employer Ashad to the police, but the police brought him back to the factory seeking a finder's fee for returning escaped bonded labourers. Iqbal escaped a second time and attended the Bonded Labour Liberation Front (BLLF) school for former child slaves and quickly completed a four-year education in only two years. Iqbal helped over 3,000 Pakistani children that were in bonded labour escape to freedom and made speeches about child labour all over the world.

He expressed a desire to become a lawyer to better equip him to free bonded labourers, and he visited other countries, including Sweden and the United States, to share his story, encouraging others to join the fight to eradicate child slavery.

In 1994 he received the Reebok Human Rights Award in Boston, and in his acceptance speech he said:

I am one of those millions of children who are suffering in Pakistan through bonded labour and child labour, but I am lucky that due to the efforts of Bonded Labour Liberation Front, I go out in freedom I am standing in front of you here today. After my freedom, I joined BLLF School and I am studying in that school now. For us slave children, Ehsan Ullah Khan and BLLF have done the same work that Abraham Lincoln did for the slaves of America. Today, you are free and I am free too.

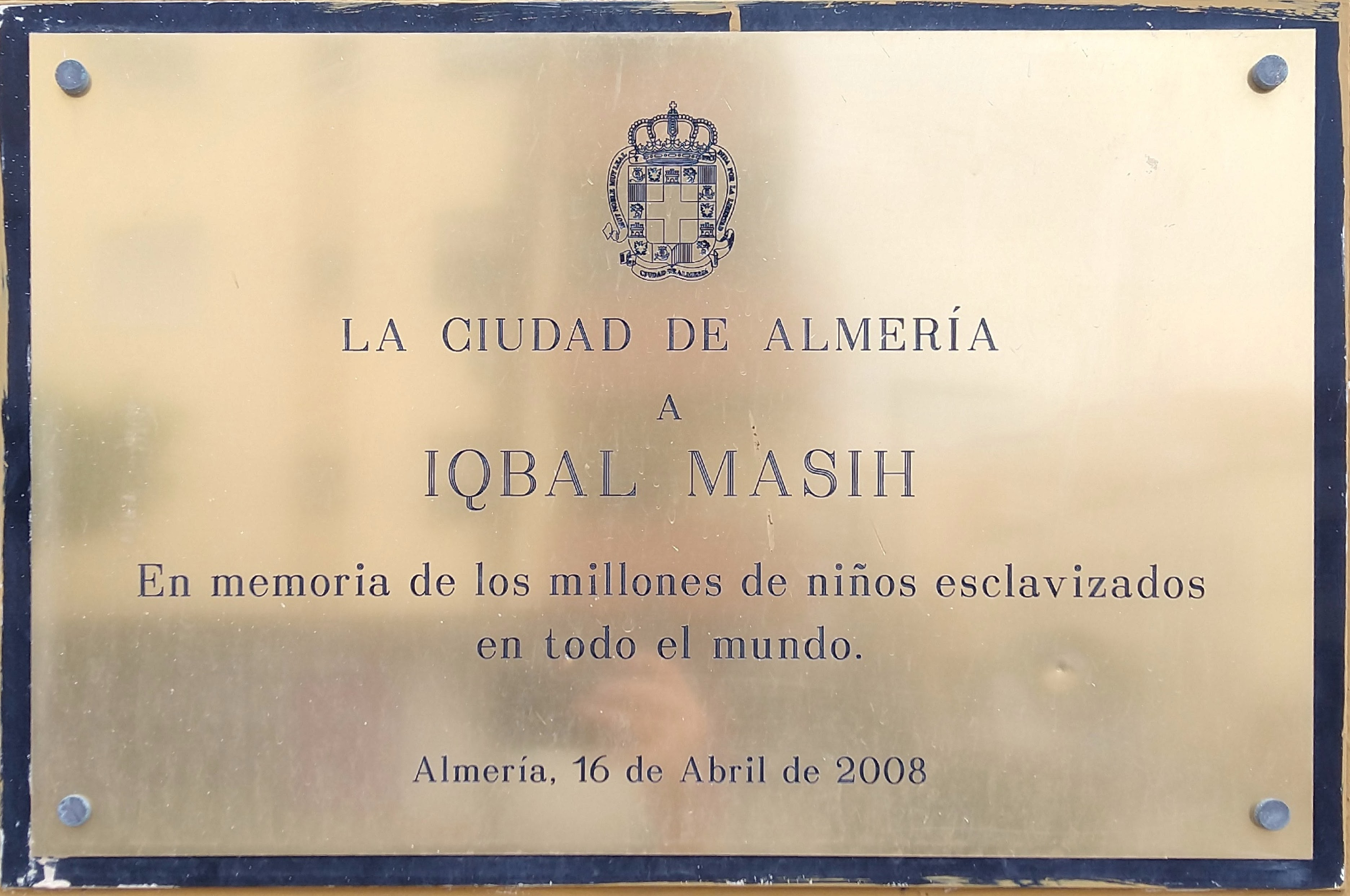
Plaque in memory of Iqbal Masih in Almería, Spain

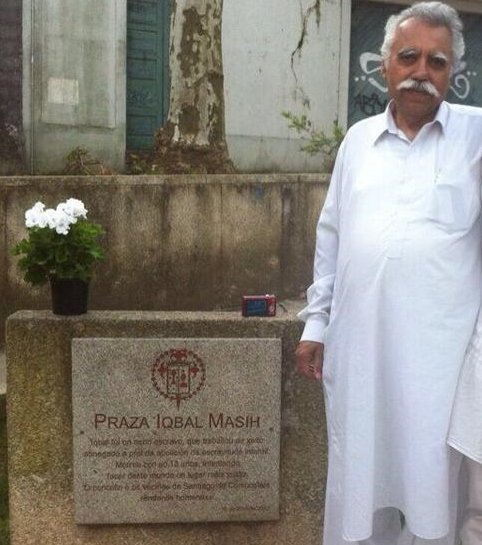
Ehsan Ullah Khan visits the Iqbal Masih Square in Santiago de Compostela, Spain

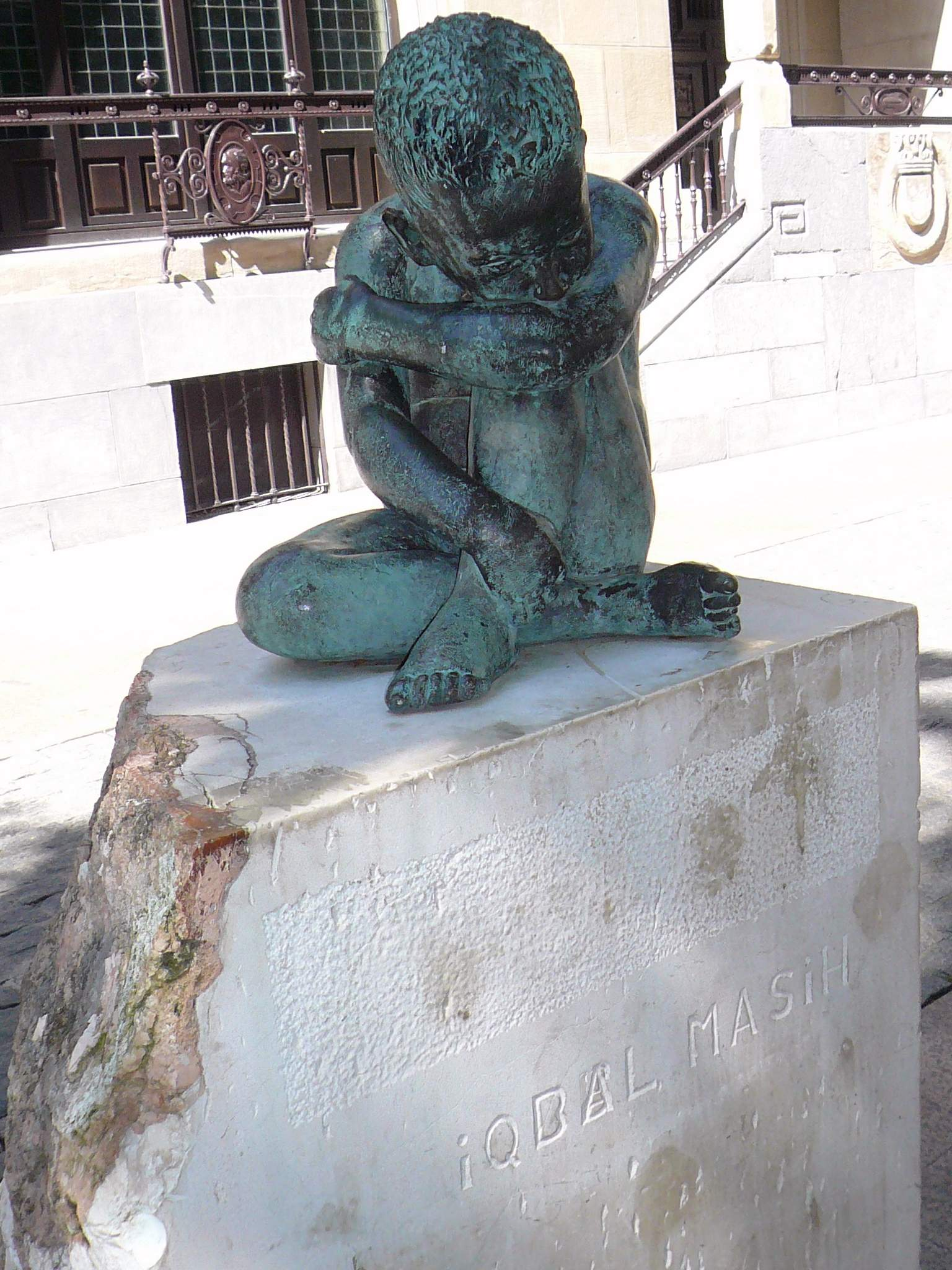
'The girls and boys of Vitoria-Gasteiz in homage to Iqbal Masih', memorial in Vitoria-Gasteiz, Spain

== Death ==
Iqbal Masih, a brave and eloquent boy who attended several international conferences to denounce the hardships of child weavers in Pakistan, was shot dead with a shotgun while he and some friends were cycling in their village of Muridke, near Lahore.

While visiting relatives in Muridke on 16 April 1995, Easter Sunday, Iqbal was fatally shot by the "carpet mafia", a gang that killed slaves if they ran away from a carpet factory. He was 12 years old at the time of his death. His funeral was attended by approximately 800 mourners. In the following week, a protest of 3,000 people, half of whom were younger than 12, took place in Lahore demanding an end to child labor.

His mother said she did not believe her son had been the victim of a plot by the "carpet mafia". However, the BLLF disagreed, because Iqbal had received death threats from individuals connected to the Pakistani carpet industry, the most recent of which had been two weeks prior to his death.

Following his death, Pakistani economic elites responded to declining carpet sales by denying that they were using bonded child labour in their factories and by employing the Federal Investigation Agency (FIA) to harass and arrest activists working for the BLLF. The Pakistani press conducted a smear campaign against the BLLF, arguing that child labourers received high wages and favourable working conditions.

== Legacy ==
- Iqbal's cause inspired the creation of organizations such as We Charity, a Canada-based charity and youth movement, the Iqbal Masih Shaheed Children Foundation, which has founded over 20 schools in Pakistan, and GoodWeave International (formerly Rugmark).
- In 1994, Iqbal visited Broad Meadows Middle School in Quincy, Massachusetts, and spoke to 7th graders about his life. He inspired the famous afterschool program run by teacher Ronald Adams called ODW (Operation: Day's Work). When the students learned of his death, they decided to raise money with a financially productive program called "Penny Power," and build a school in his honour in Kasur, Pakistan.
- Iqbal's story was depicted in a book entitled Iqbal by Francesco D'Adamo, a fictional story based on true events, from the point of view of a girl named Fatima.
- In 1994 he received the Reebok Youth in Action Award.
- In 1996 the Movimiento Cultural Cristiano (MCC- Christian Cultural Movement) and Camino Juvenil Solidario (CJS- Youth Solidarity Path) promoted 16 April as International Day Against Child Slavery in Spain and South America.
- In 1998 the newly formed Istituto Comprensivo Iqbal Masih, a comprehensive education institute comprising several schools in Trieste, Italy, was named after him.
- In 2000 he received a posthumous World's Children's Prize for the Rights of the Child and the Piazzale dei Traghetti Iqbal Masih was inaugurated in Genoa, Italy.
- The 2006 book The Little Hero: One Boy's Fight for Freedom tells the story of his legacy.
- In 2009 the United States Congress established the annual Iqbal Masih Award for the Elimination of Child Labor.
- On 16 April 2012, the Council of Santiago, after a proposal of Movimiento Cultural Cristiano, inaugurated a square named after Iqbal in Santiago de Compostela, Spain.
- The 2014 Nobel Peace Prize was awarded to children's rights advocate Kailash Satyarthi on grounds of prevention of child labour and promotion of female education. Satyarthi mentioned Masih in his Nobel Peace Prize award speech, dedicating it to him and other martyrs.
- In 2016, the "X Iqbal Masih Rugby Tournament" was held in Catania, Sicily.
- On 17 April 2017, the University of Salamanca committed itself to celebrating every 16 April as a Day Against Child Slavery on behalf of Iqbal Masih.
- In May 2019, Sharmeen Obaid Chinoy released an Urdu-animated short titled 'Iqbal Ka Bachpan' which explores the story of Iqbal under its 4-part series, "Shattering the Silence".
- On 23 March 2022, President of Pakistan Arif Alvi conferred the Sitara-e-Shujaat (award for bravery) posthumously to Iqbal.
- In December 2023, Shoaib Sultan directed the film Gunjal, based on the murder of Iqbal Masih. It features Ahmed Ali Akbar, Resham and Amna Ilyas in leading roles.
- "Iqbal - The Forgotten Story" is an upcoming and yet unreleased Pakistani movie directed by Raja Saad. The movie stars Alyy Khan & Adnan Siddiqui.

== See also ==
- Aitzaz Hasan
- Arfa Karim
- Sana Yousaf
