= Sumangali =

Sumangali (lit. 'married woman') may refer to:

- Sumangali (child labour), a type of child labour in India, employment for dowry
- Sumangali (1940 film), an Indian Telugu-language film, starring Chittor V. Nagaiah and A. S. Giri
- Sumangali (1959 film), an Indian Tamil-language film, starring K. Balaji and E. V. Saroja
- Sumangali (1965 film), an Indian Telugu-language film, starring Nageshwara Rao and Savitri
- Sumangali (1971 film), an Indian Malayalam-language film, starring Prem Nazir and Jayabharathi
- Sumangali (1983 film), an Indian Tamil-language film, starring Sivaji Ganesan and Sujatha
- Sumangali (1989 film), an Indian Telugu-language film, starring Krishnam Raju and Jaya Prada
- Sumangali (TV series), a 2017–2019 Indian Tamil-language drama series
