= Vigil India Movement =

- Formation: 1977
- Founder: M.A. Thomas
- Type: NGO
- Location: Bangalore
- Region served: India
- President: K. Pratap Reddy
- Managing Trustee: P.P. Bopanna

Vigil India Movement (Vigil India) is a non-governmental organisation based in Bangalore working in the field of human rights in India. Founded in 1977, by Rev. Dr. M.A. Thomas, who also founded the Ecumenical Christian Centre in Bangalore in 1963 and Association of Christian Institutes for Social Concern in Asia.

In 1998, Vigil India launched The Institute of Human Rights with Mr. Justice M.N. Venkatachaliah, former Chief Justice of India and former chairman of the National Human Rights Commission. The Institute is a training programme for human rights activists, "training trainers" for grass roots education in human rights.

Nomination open to M A Thomas Human Rights Award 2018.

The organisation awards the Rev. M.A. Thomas National Human Rights Award annually.

The recipients since 1993 include:

- Lenin Raghuvanshi, 2016
- Jayamma Bandari, 2014
- Swami Agnivesh, 2006
- Teesta Setalvad, 2004
- Harsh Mander, 2002
- Medha Patkar, 1999
- Justice V. R. Krishna Iyer, 1998
- Ravi Nair, 1997
