= Debt bondage in India =

Debt bondage in India (Hindi: बंधुआ मज़दूरी, romanized: bandhua mazdoori) was legally abolished in 1976 but remains prevalent due to weak enforcement by the government. Bonded labour is a system in which lenders force their borrowers to repay loans through labor. Additionally, these debts often take a large amount of time to pay off and are unreasonably high, propagating a cycle of generational inequality. This is due to the typically high interest rates on the loans given out by employers. Although debt bondage is considered to be a voluntary form of labor, people are forced into this system by social situations.

Debt bondage has deep roots in Indian history, dating back to the period when India was under colonial rule. On a more recent note, according to the 2016 Global Slavery Index, India has the 4th most slaves with 19 million Indians enslaved in some form, including debt bondage. Many Indians enter debt bondage to reduce alternative risks of financial burden and violence. Additionally, the Indian caste system has led to social inequality and corruption which collectively allow this system to persist. Agricultural and brick kiln workers, including child laborers, are the main Indians involved in this practice. Although the Indian government has committed to awarding compensations for freed workers, most workers face negative consequences such as further inequality and health effects, which often results in these laborers committing suicide.

The rise of Dalit activism, government legislation starting as early as 1949, as well as ongoing work by NGOs and government offices to enforce labour laws and rehabilitate those in debt, appears to have contributed to the reduction of bonded labour in India. Additionally, both domestic and international organizations have been involved in the legal and rehabilitation process of ending this practice. However, according to research papers presented by the International Labour Organization, there are still many obstacles to the eradication of bonded labour in India.

== History ==
=== Before Independence ===
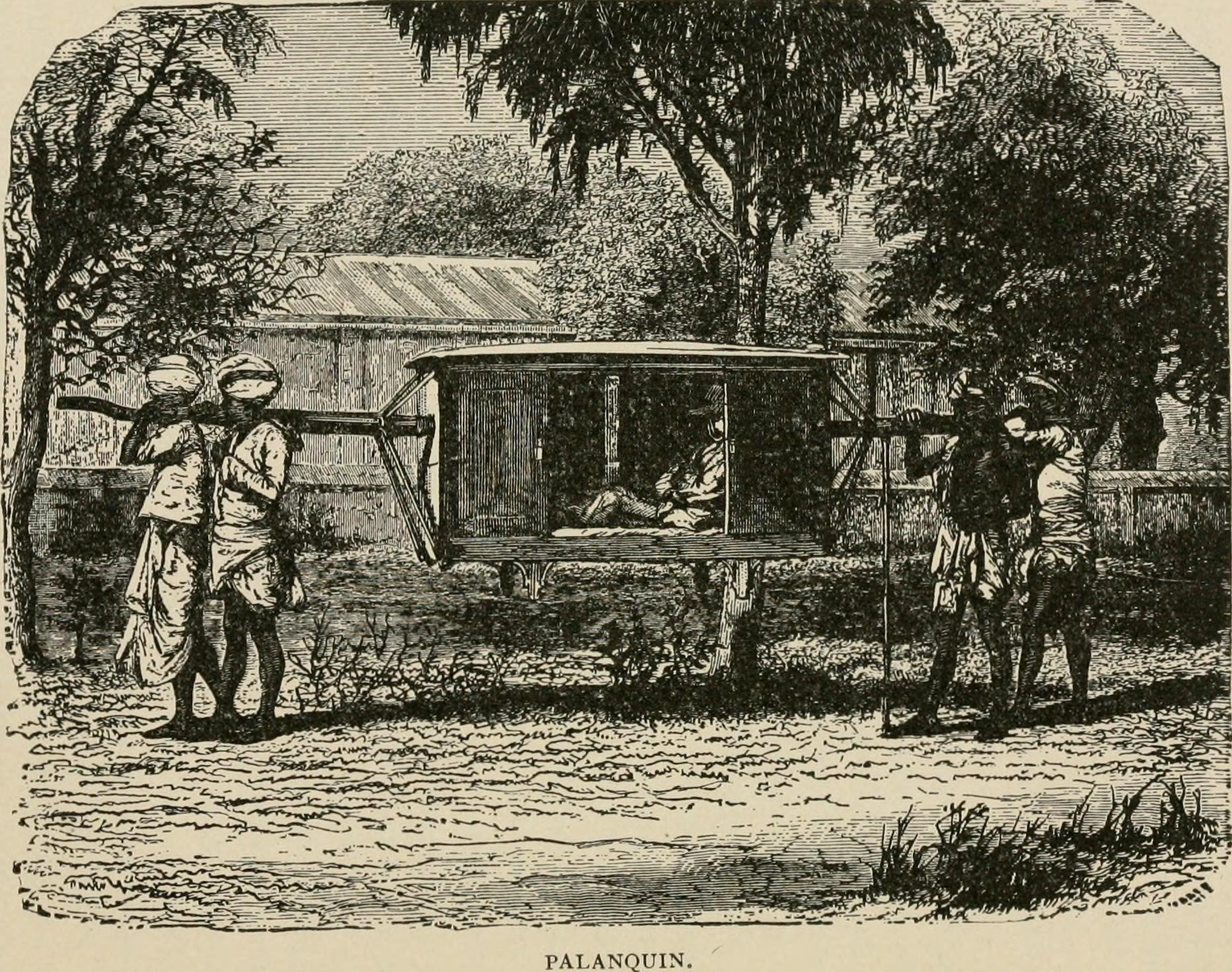
Workers in colonial India

Although there were far more cases of involuntary slavery in eighteenth and nineteenth century India, the colonial history of India set a precedent for debt bondage. Specifically, Indian indentured workers were in high demand from European colonial powers, and many Indians were sent to Australia to reduce the costs and societal effects of indentured servitude. France, who had an economic and political presence in India, created a system of indentured servitude in the Indian Ocean which about 3,000 Indians were a part of in the 1830s. By 1847, there were over 6,500 indentured servants in the Indian Ocean, including those in India. These French settlers traditionally held onto wages which initiated a system of debt bondage. In the second half of the nineteenth century, many Indians successfully formed unions and utilized trials to free these workers. Nevertheless, India felt the impacts of these historical systems of labor in the twentieth century.

In 1935, the colonial government passed the Government of India Act with the goal of developing the Indian economy. Unfortunately, this further stratified the social hierarchy in India, contributing to the debt bondage system. Before India gained independence in 1947, the caste system and hierarchy of land ownership allowed the Indian social system to mirror feudalism. Specifically, members of the high castes in India gave out loans to members of the lower castes. These lenders forced their borrowers to repay these loans through labor. The fact that these borrowers could not purchase land allowed this practice to perpetuate across generations.

=== Bonded Labor System Act of 1976 ===
In 1976, Indira Gandhi and the Indian government passed the Bonded Labor System Act of 1976 which released bonded laborers and stated that the practice of debt bondage in India was no longer allowed. This act also allowed the Indian judicial powers to set up trials for labor offenses at both the national and local levels. This legislation canceled all debt against bonded laborers and delegated the enforcement of this set of rules to district magistrates. These individuals were responsible for distributing credit to former laborers and making sure that local systems of labor were not corrupted once again. However, due to poor enforcement, many workers stayed under debt bondage. According to the Ministry of Labor and Employment in India, nearly 300,000 Indians were still under debt bondage in 2009. Many researchers, such as Augendra Bhukuth, Jérôme Ballet, and Nicolas Sirven, argue that this is part of a larger effort of employers looking to exert a strong sense of discipline and control over their workers. Authors such as Isabelle Guérin argue that this act did not clearly define debt bondage which made the policies created by this legislation up to one's interpretation. Additionally, many Indians are not educated about this act.

== Forms of debt bondage ==
It is estimated by Siddharth Kara that 84 to 88% of the bonded laborers in the world are in South Asia. Out of all forms of systems in slavery in the world, the Indian debt bondage system has one of the highest numbers of forced laborers. According to the Ministry of Labor and Employment of the Government of India, there are over 300,000 bonded laborers in India, with a majority of them in the states of Tamil Nadu, Karnataka, and Odisha. Many historians such as Tom Brass debate the ethics of the debt bondage system. Whereas some analysts say that bonded labor is a form of anti-capitalism and limits the freedom of choice for laborers, others say that this system is voluntary.

=== Agricultural workers ===
Debt bondage in India is most prevalent in agricultural areas, with 80% of workers in the debt bondage system being involved in agriculture. Many farmers take out loans to be able to work on land, and landlords generate high amounts of profit by paying these workers less than minimum wage. These farmers inevitably accumulate interest due to the need of health care and basic resources. Farmers taking out small loans can find themselves paying interest that exceeds 100% of the loans per year. Additionally, many lenders only let the value of labor pay off interest and require the principal loan amount to be paid off through cash. According to a 2012 study, farmers receive as little as US$180 and accumulate penalties for taking sick days. This reduces the potential that farmers have to develop their land. Agricultural workers that are close to entering debt bondage have recently looked toward maistries who offer interest-free loans and more money to borrowers.

According to a study about labor in Andhra Pradesh located in South India, the Palamur debt bondage system began in the 1930s. Workers in this system rely on a district leader who is in charge of distributing work, money, food, and resources. These laborers face poor living conditions, intense work and long hours, and are not able to unionize or effectively communicate with other workers. Additionally, district leaders often do not employ workers during the monsoon season, forcing workers to look towards other occupations and sources of income.

=== Children ===
In 2013, India had the highest number of child laborers in the world. Most Indian child laborers are centered in rural India in the agricultural industry. As of 2009, most of these children worked in the states of Andhra Pradesh, Assam, and Bihar. According to both 1997 and 2003 studies in India, there were 15 million bonded child laborers centered in India. 98% of these individuals were a part of the Dalit caste, which is the lowest Indian caste, or the indigenous Adivasi group. The presence of a large number of child laborers is regarded as a serious issue in terms of economic welfare. These children are often tied to in this debt bondage system to work for their employers for a time period that could be stretched to a lifetime, and usually with minimal or no pay. This contributes to a long term employer-slave relationship. Child laborers are typically put into the debt bondage system by their parents to pay off economic and social costs. According to a 2001 study by the Physicians for Humans Rights, most child laborers are working to pay off loans for their parents and receive as little as 18 rupees a day. Although Articles 24 and 39 of the Indian constitution protect Indian children from debt bondage labor, these individuals cannot form unions and are more vulnerable to low wages and exploitation. Recent initiatives to end the participation of children in debt bondage has led to the creation of an underground market for the labor of these individuals. Whereas some researchers argue that eradicating child labor will lower wages for children that will continue to work despite institutionalized rules against this form of labor, others such as Augendra Bhukuth argue that getting rid of this institution is necessary.

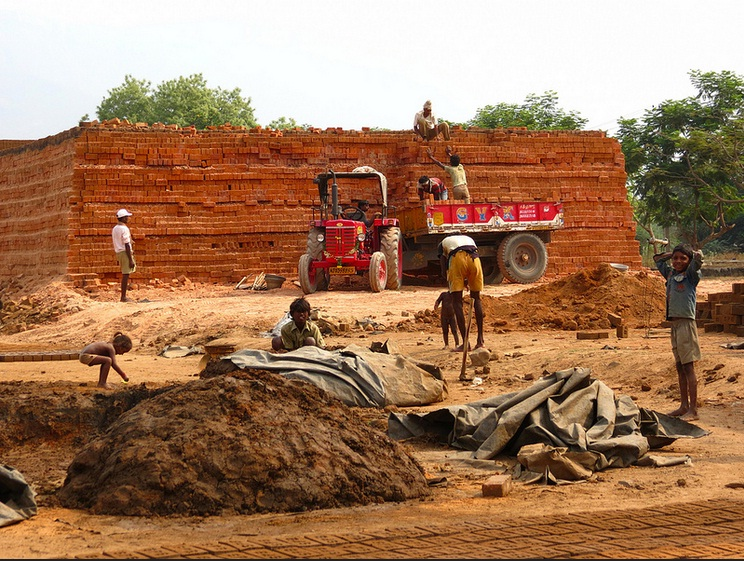
Brick kiln workers in Hyderabad, a city in India

=== Other workers ===
Workers in the brick kiln and sugarcane industries often enter debt bondage. Researchers specifically categorize the brick kiln industry as a form of debt bondage since workers in this institution receive money in advance which they must later pay off. According to a 2003 study, although most Indian laborers in the brick kiln industry did not enter debt bondage, the number of workers entering debt bondage was increasing due to a lack of trust between brokers, or lenders, and borrowers. Although employers in charge of this industry do not employ children, workers inevitably turn to their children to improve their chances of completing their tasks and receiving a loan in the first place. According to a 2007 study in Chennai and Madurai in the Indian state of Tamil Nadu about the brick kiln industry, many Indians hold different views on the relationship between brokers and workers. Whereas some argue that this relationship is built upon mutualism, others cite the harms of this connection since workers in this industry are seasonal, receive conditional advances, and receive low wages, often only covering the costs of food. Additionally, workers are continually exploited by the wage system as they are often paid per brick laid, encouraging them to work for long hours and even when ill to meet their requirements. Wage discrepancies also continue to exist between what these migrant workers are owed and what they actually make. As of 2019, there are over 23 million Indians involved in the brick kiln industry, many of whom are involved in debt bondage.

Additionally, industries such as the quarrying, mining, and manual cleaning businesses hire cheap workers through debt bondage. Although the Indian government passed the Manual Scavengers and Rehabilitation Act in 2013, there were over 12,000 laborers in this industry in 2016, mostly centered in Uttar Pradesh. One other form of debt bondage is that of Sumangali in which families of lower caste levels enter debt bondage to pay off high dowries.

== Contributing factors ==
=== Caste system ===
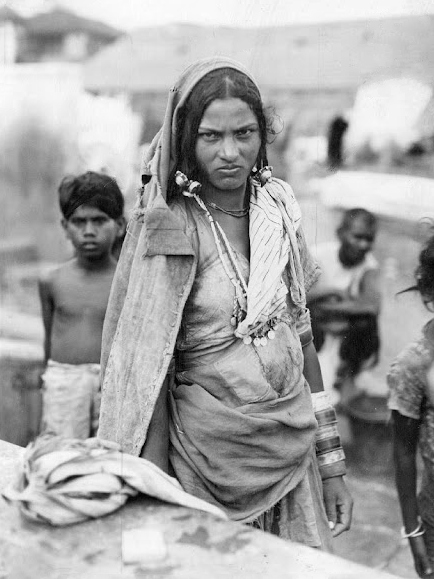
Woman of Dalit Caste in 1942 Mumbai

The Indian caste system, which was widely popular in the 20th century, has five tiers, with Dalits making up the base of this system. Researchers such as author Sarah Knight believe that the caste system and its contribution to social stratification makes debt bondage more acceptable. Specifically, Dalits have little access to education, health care, and housing which forces them to take out loans and enter forced labor. Additionally, they often do not qualify for loans from banks which forces them to borrow money from lenders at a high interest rate. Due to a lack of education, these individuals often don't learn about human rights or have a proper platform for activism. Hence, there is a correlation between economic opportunity and one's caste. Although the government has attempted to create quota based initiatives to increase the opportunity of mobility in both the economic and political spheres, these initiatives have historically been met with opposition by Indians from higher castes. Many political organizations such as the Bahujan Samaj Party have attempted to represent Indians from lower castes. However, one criticism of such organizations is that they tend to reinforce class immobility by separating politics by caste.

=== Inequality ===
Although debt bondage is outlawed in India, many Indians especially from developing communities do not receive education about their rights. The development of technology for agriculture in India varies from state to state. Thus, many landowners rely on Indians and migrants for cheap labor. Additionally, many industries, such as the gem-cutting industry, tend to have a high frequency of child laborers. This perpetuates a system of educational inequality in which members of low castes and children of laborers have little to no access to education. According to a 2010 survey, 76 in 100 bonded laborers in India were unable to read or write. Illiteracy in India leads to more of an unawareness of legal and human rights. Additionally, migrant workers in debt bondage experience social isolation due to their undocumented status. A 2016 study conducted by the Prayas Center for Labor Research and Action (PCLRA) surveying Rajasthani families across 200 kilns found that migrant workers access to government entitlements such as ration cards is very poor.

In reference to child labor, since debt is often passed down from generation to generation, many children find themselves in the debt bondage system at a very early age. In addition to illiteracy, unemployment and poverty are commonly cited as causes of children entering the debt bondage system. According to a mathematical economic analysis of the institution of child debt bondage by researchers Arnab Basu and Nancy Chau, children mainly enter the institution of debt bondage due to the high incidence of poverty in many parts of India and the world. Additionally, this system is cyclical due to the developing public education system in India. Many schools do not prepare students for life post-graduation which decreases their chances of social mobility. Child laborers often find themselves working when the growing season and public school schedule coincide.

=== Corruption ===
Researchers also cite the corruption of the Indian government and judicial system as a factor of debt bondage. Due to the millions of pending cases in the court system, many workers who entered debt bondage have issues with access to judges. Additionally, due to the tendency for monopolies to form in India, lenders often force debt laborers to borrow more money through high interest rates. When workers encounter unexpected expenses, such as paying for religious ceremonies or medical care, they run an even higher risk of accumulating even more debt and interest. Migrant workers from neighboring countries specifically are more susceptible to entering into these long-lasting lender-borrower relationships due to a general lack of attention for the rights of workers.

One of the reasons that this corruption is able to persist is due to the statistics dispersed about Indian labor. For example, the National Sample Survey Office under the Ministry of Planning and Program Implementation is responsible for collecting and spreading information about job counts and statistics about labor. However, they often do not correctly do so, allowing the unethical aspects of labor in India to go unnoticed. In 2016, the Indian government set a goal of freeing over 18 million Indians from debt bondage over a span of 14 years by increasing payments to former bonded laborers. However, according to 2019 data, most laborers have not received these additional compensations, leading to an influx of workers taking out loans and entering debt bondage again.

Author and academic Siddharth Kara believes that:

Bonded labour is a relic of history that should have long ago been eliminated from South Asia, but greed, corruption, and government ineffectiveness allow this caustic mode of exploitation to persist well into modern times. In order to ensure basic human rights, guarantee untainted global supply chains, and protect international security, the forces that promote bonded labour must be tackled immediately.

== Consequences ==
=== Farmers' suicides ===
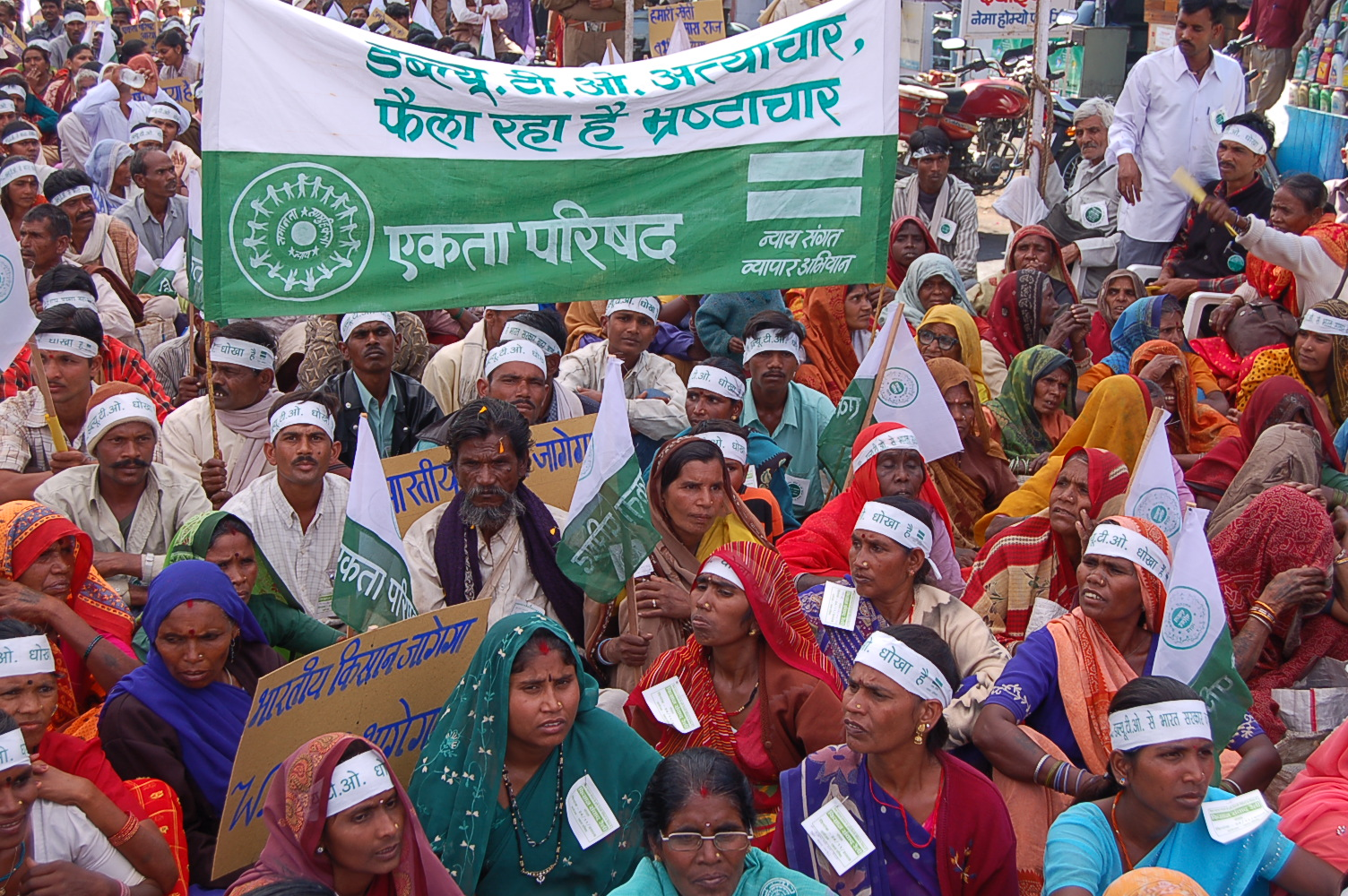
Rally for Farmers' Rights in 2005 Bhopal, India

Due to the lack of restrictions on the agricultural industry, the profits that workers in this industry receive widely fluctuates, creating an unreliable source of income for farmers. In 2018, nearly half of all Indian agricultural households accumulated a debt equivalent to nearly fifteen-hundred US dollars. Due to the structure and rules set by many Indian banks, these households cannot take out more loans to develop their land. Instead, they accumulate large amounts of interest and enter debt bondage. Additionally, this industry is marked by high levels of competition and seasonal profits. Thus, farmers are more susceptible to committing suicide if they do not have a large amount of land and are in debt. These individuals typically commit suicide using pesticides. In fact, farmers in some rural parts of India are twice as likely to commit suicide than urban Indians. From 1997 to 2012, over 180,000 farmers committed suicide in India due to the burden of debt. In 2016, there were over 11,000 suicides by Indian farmers. However, the Indian government did not disclose how many of these deaths were directly caused by debt.

=== Further inequality ===
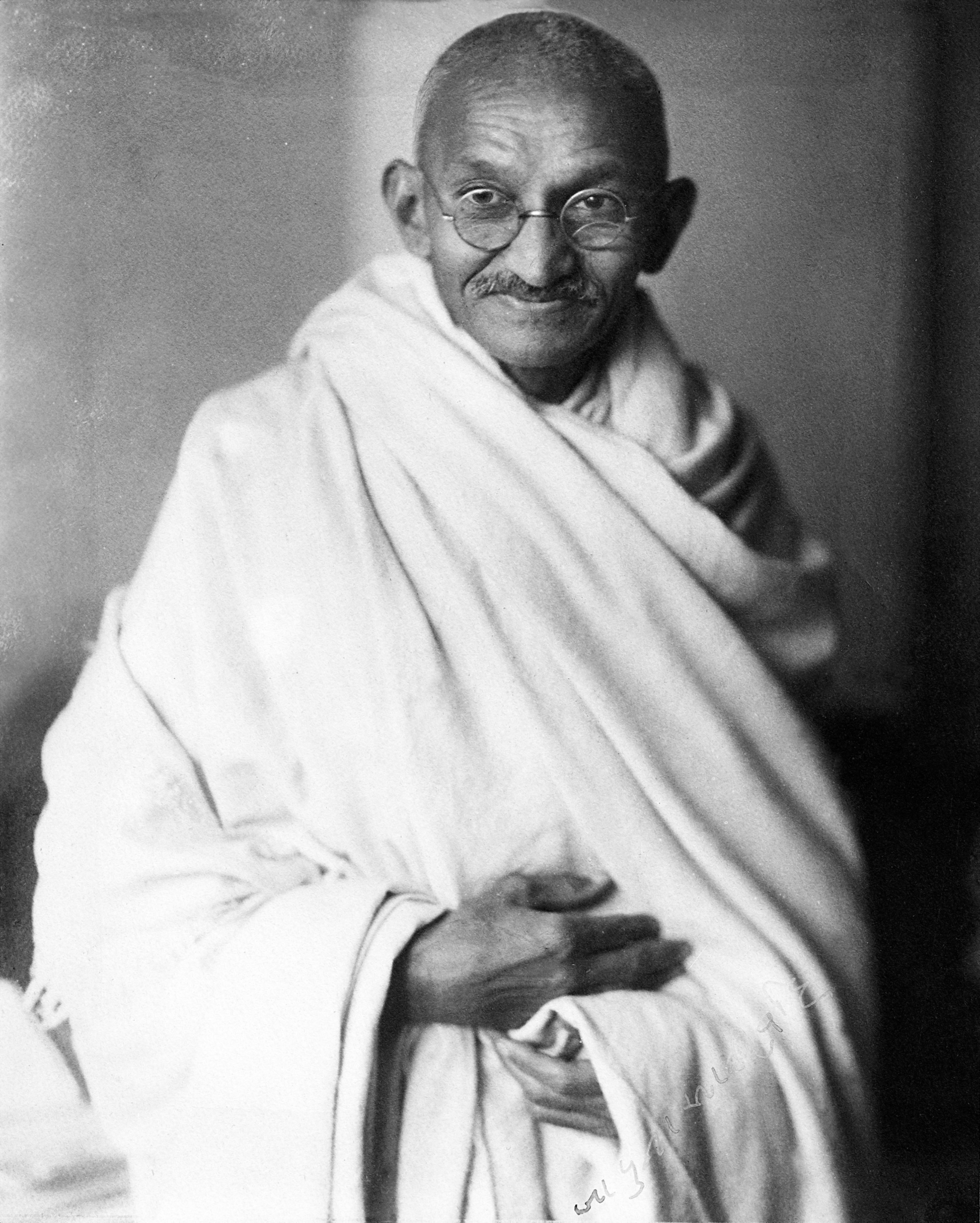
Mahatma Gandhi, who criticized the bondage system

The debt bondage institution in India is characterized by a system known as halipratha which relies on a master-servant connection. Mahatma Gandhi criticized this system and its employers and attempted to declare the Bonded Labour Liberation Day in 1939. However, these employers did not accept these initiatives since they involved increasing wages for workers and ending debt bondage for long term workers. Researchers such as Jan Breman claim that the motivations of employers under this system is not primarily economic but is rather marked by a drive to develop political power and dominance over others. For example, the debt bondage system was used as a way to force tribes in nineteenth century Gujurat into lower castes.

On a more current note, many Indian workers are a part of a new form of bonded labor. This system is characterized by work which requires long hours and an environment that fails to allow laborers to organize or find other jobs. Thus, workers in this system are trapped by their occupation and hand these economics burdens down across generations, leading to cases of child labor. Child labor specifically stunts the intellectual growth of students in primary education. This system also leads to lower school attendance and fewer opportunities for social mobility. Nevertheless, many employers cite this form of labor as a way for families to receive a steady form of income.

=== Health effects ===
Many laborers in the debt bondage system are vulnerable to hazardous health conditions such as infection from dangerous working conditions, reproductive health disparities, and lifelong respiratory conditions. According to a study about the brick kiln industry in India, many workers under the debt bondage system suffer from enduring high levels of heat during the summer. Laborers in this industry are forced into uncomfortable positions for long periods of time. For this reason, they face long-term musculoskeletal problems.

Women are also disproportionately impacted by negative health outcomes due to lack of access to reproductive healthcare. It is common for women workers to give birth outside of hospitals and underutilize maternal healthcare resources. Since migrant kiln workers are often paid per brick laid, many women expose themselves to pollutants throughout their pregnancy and don't take sufficient time off after giving birth. Women often sacrifice their own wellbeing to make enough money to feed their children.

Children are particularly susceptible to experiencing long-term health issues and are specifically susceptible to skin and breathing diseases. Child laborers in the debt bondage system often receive cuts and burns or contract liver disease due to their participation in the silver, beedi, and silk industries. Many children also face food insecurity due to a lack of welfare entitlements and frequent migrations by their families in search of work. This results in high prevalence of stunting and wasting in migrant workers' children.

Additionally, laborers in the agriculture industry are vulnerable to snake bites and pesticide poisoning due to a lack of protective gear and clean drinking and cleansing water. The polluted environment of brick kilns also contributes to high prevalence of respiratory diseases such as silicosis and tuberculosis in migrant worker populations. Silicosis is an irreversible lung disease caused by inhaling silica dust, which is present in the clay, coal, and sand needed to produce bricks. This silica dust scars the lungs, making workers even more vulnerable to other respiratory infections like tuberculosis. Despite the multitude of occupational health hazards present in brick kilns, workers are typically forced to continue to work through these conditions, since taking time off work can cause these laborers to accumulate more debt.

== Initiatives ==
=== Government regulations ===
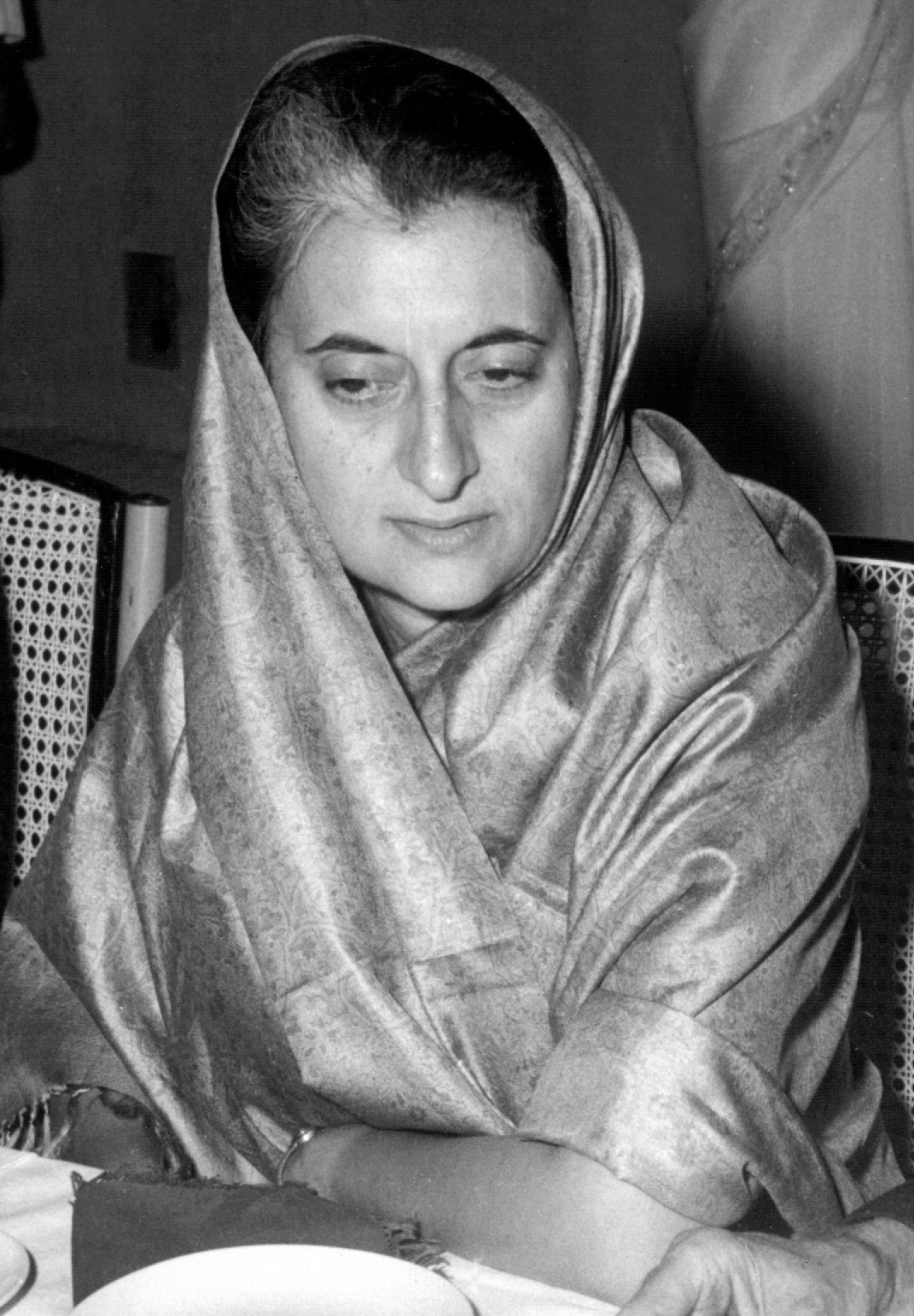
Indira Gandhi in 1967, nine years before passing the Bonded Labour System (Abolition) Act

The passage of the Bonded Labour System Act of 1976 by Indira Gandhi and the Indian government set a precedent for future government initiatives to tackle labour issues. In 1978, the Indian government instituted a national plan to disperse over 20,000 rupees (about 300 US dollars) to each freed debt labourer. On a similar note, the National Rural Employment Guarantee Act recently guaranteed employment to one adult in a rural house that has a considerable financial burden. State governments take on this issue in a variety of ways. For example, many Indian states target landless workers in local debt relief efforts.

Additionally, to tackle the issue of child labour, the government passed the Child Labour Act and National Policy on Child Labour in 1986 and 1987 respectively. These initiatives created projects such as the National Child Labour Project which created rehabilitation programs for children and provided education and food to former child labourers. They also regulated the hours and conditions of child labourers and utilized a team of inspectors to prohibit these individuals from working in dangerous industries. Later on, in 1994, the Elimination of Child Labour Act incorporated more vocational training into schools to help students find opportunities for social mobility after graduation. Researchers such as Arnab Basu and Nancy Chau suggest that countries with a high incidence of child debt bondage like India must first address the low wages of farmers and the lack of alternatives to entering debt bondage for individuals in poverty.

=== Organizations ===
Bandhua Mukti Morcha ('Bonded Labour Liberation Front') is an organization whose purpose is to identify and free bonded labourers in India. Since 1981, the year Swami Agnivesh created this organization, the Bonded Labour Liberation Front has helped release nearly 180,000 bonded labourers and has initiated rehabilitation efforts to get these individuals back on their feet. Additionally, this organization has been active in advocating for a higher minimum wage and more government efforts in ending debt bondage in India.

Gramin avam Samajik Vikas Sanstha (GSVS) is a non-profit organization registered under the Rajasthan Society Act of 1958. Founded in 2001, one of the organization's key missions is to empower marginalized migrant workers through education and advocacy programs. GSVS also runs crèche centers where cost-free meals, education, and health checkups are provided to children of migrant and unorganized workers.

In 1993, the Human Rights Act created the National Human Rights Commission which investigates issues of human rights violations. Another organization that works on similar initiatives is the Center for Education and Communication which collaborates with NGOs and is responsible for educating the world about this issue. Additionally, the Academy of Development Science created a grain bank to tackle the issue of food scarcity and help Indians stay out of debt. Finally, the Indian National Commission on Labour has met numerous times to create more protection for Indian workers, especially those who cannot organize.

On an international level, in 1948, the Universal Declaration of Human Rights outlawed the practice of debt bondage. Similarly, in 1956, the United Nations Supplementary Convention on the Abolition of Slavery officially prohibited this institution. Additionally, more recently, the Dalit Freedom Network, a British NGO, has brought many children out of debt bondage and has worked to end Dalit slavery. Organizations such as the UNRISD recommend more state involvement and collaboration between the government and businesses to solve issues of poverty. Anti-Slavery International is involved in relieving thousands of Indian brick kiln and agricultural workers from debt bondage in Chhattisgarh, Punjab, and Uttar Pradesh. They also work with community groups and organize legal efforts to free Indians from slavery.

=== International Labour Organization ===
The International Labour Organization (ILO) is responsible for dissecting labour issues and making sure exports are ethical. In 1998, India passed 39 out of the 189 conventions of the ILO, including an agreement about ending forced labor. This was a part of a larger initiative by the ILO to force countries to end forced labor through the Declaration on Fundamental Principles and Rights at Work.

Additionally, the ILO has implemented microfinance initiatives to help Indians in debt. This organization has been careful to use microfinance – the distribution of small loans at low interest costs – to help Indians who have a high risk of entering debt bondage or falling back into this form of forced labour. The intervention of the ILO in India has led to the creation of the Integrated Rural Development Society and Madras Social Service Society, which focus on preventative measures for the issue of debt bondage. This has forced state governments to commit more time and attention towards tackling bonded labour issues. Additionally, this has led to more initiatives which involve teaching employers about alternatives to debt bondage, increasing educational opportunities for students, and providing aid for the costs of health care.

== See also ==
- Bonded Labour Liberation Front
- Debt Conciliation Board
- Farmers' suicides in India
- Indian black money
- Kisan Credit Card
- Siddharth Kara
- Bonded Labour System (Abolition) Act, 1976

General:

- Corruption in India
- Feudalism in India
- Feudalism in Pakistan
- Labour in India
- Poverty in India
