= Debt bondage =

Slavery as a means to repay debt

Debt bondage, also known as debt slavery, bonded labour, or peonage, is the pledge of a person's services as security for the repayment for a debt or other obligations. Where the terms of the repayment are not clearly or reasonably stated, or where the debt is excessively large, the person who holds the debt has thus some control over the laborer, whose freedom depends on the undefined or excessive debt repayment. The services required to repay the debt may be undefined, and the services' duration may be undefined, thus allowing the person supposedly owed the debt to demand services indefinitely. Debt bondage can be passed on from generation to generation.

In 2021, the International Labour Organization estimated that, of the 27.6 million people currently participating in forced labour, 20.9%, or about 5.8 million, were in debt bondage. Debt bondage has been described by the United Nations as a form of "modern day slavery", and the Supplementary Convention on the Abolition of Slavery seeks to abolish the practice.

The practice is still prevalent, especially in South Asia and parts of Western and Southern Africa, despite the fact that most countries in these regions are parties to the Supplementary Convention on the Abolition of Slavery. Lack of prosecution or insufficient punishment of this crime are the leading causes of the practice as it exists at this scale today.

== Overview ==
=== Definition ===
Though the Forced Labour Convention of 1930 by the International Labour Organization, which included 187 parties, sought to bring organised attention to eradicating slavery through forms of forced labor, formal opposition to debt bondage in particular came at the Supplementary Convention on the Abolition of Slavery in 1956. The convention in 1956 defined debt bondage under Article 1, section (a):

Debt bondage, that is to say, the status or condition arising from a pledge by a debtor of his personal services or of those of a person under his control as security for a debt if the value of those services as reasonably assessed is not applied towards the liquidation of the debt or the length and nature of those services are not respectively limited and defined;

When a pledge to provide services to pay off debt is made by an individual, the employer often illegally inflates interest rates at an unreasonable amount, making it impossible for the individual to leave bonded labour. When the bonded labourer dies, debts are often passed on to children.

=== Usage of term ===
Although debt bondage, forced labour, and human trafficking are all defined as forms or variations of slavery, each term is distinct. Debt bondage differs from forced labour and human trafficking in that a person consciously pledges to work as a means of repayment of debt without being placed into labor against will.

Debt bondage only applies to individuals who have no hopes of leaving the labor due to inability to ever pay debt back. Those who offer their services to repay a debt and the employer reduces the debt accordingly at a rate commensurate with the value of labor performed are not in debt bondage.

== History ==
=== Africa ===
Important to both East and West Africa, pawnship, defined by Wilks as "the use of people in transferring their rights for settlement of debt," was common during the 17th century. The system of pawnship occurred simultaneously with the slave trade in Africa. Though the export of slaves from Africa to the Americas is often analyzed, slavery was rampant internally as well. Development of plantations like those in Zanzibar in East Africa reflected the need for internal slaves. Furthermore, many of the slaves that were exported were male as brutal and labor-intensive conditions favored the male body build. This created gender implications for individuals in the pawnship system as more women were pawned than men and often sexually exploited.

After the abolition of slavery in many countries in the 19th century, Europeans still needed laborers. Moreover, conditions for emancipated slaves were harsh. Discrimination was rampant within the labor market, making attainment of a sustainable income for former slaves tough. Because of these conditions, many freed slaves lived through slavery-like contracts with their masters in a manner parallel to debt bondage.

=== Americas ===
During the colonial history of the United States, persons bonded themselves to an owner who paid their passage to the New World. They worked until the debt of passage was paid off, often for years. Debt peonage was practiced as "an illegal form of contemporary slavery... well into the 1950s" in "Florida, Georgia, Alabama, and other parts of the Deep South." Civil authorities would arrest "colored men off the street and in their homes if they were caught not working," charge them with vagrancy, assess fines equal to several weeks of pickers' pay, and compel them "to pick fruit or cut sugarcane to work off the debt.... Those captured were hauled to remote plantations ..., held by force, and beaten or shot if they tried to escape."

In Peru, a peonage system existed from the 16th century until land reform in the 1950s. One estate in Peru that existed from the late 16th century until it ended had up to 1,700 people employed and had a prison. They were expected to work for their landlord a minimum of three days a week and more if necessary to complete assigned work. Workers were paid a symbolic two cents per year. Workers were unable to travel outside their assigned lands without permission and were not allowed to organise any independent community activity. In the Peruvian Amazon, debt peonage is an important aspect of contemporary Urarina society.

=== Asia ===
==== The ancient Near East ====
Severe personal debt was widespread in the ancient Near East. Debtors who did not pay up could become their creditors' chattel, as could other members of their families. The problem of debt bondage, in conjunction with the state's ability to levy serfs for labour, led many to flee their homes. Some of these fugitives formed bands of roving warriors called 'habiru-men', especially in the Levant of the late second millennium. (Although not himself a fugitive from debt bondage, the story of Idrimi suggests that these groups could be a considerable threat.) The consequences of widespread debt bondage caused many kings to annul debts on ascending to the throne.

==== From the 19th century ====
In the 19th century, people in Asia were bonded to labor due to a variety of reasons ranging from farmers mortgaging harvests to drug addicts in need for opium in China. When a natural disaster occurred or food was scarce, people willingly chose debt bondage as a means to a secure life. In the early 20th century in Asia, most laborers tied to debt bondage had been born into it. In certain regions, such as in Burma, debt bondage was far more common than slavery. Many went into bondage to pay off interest on a loan or to pay taxes, and as they worked, often on farms, lodging, meals, and clothing fees were added to the existing debt causing overall debt and interest to increase. These continued added loan values made leaving servitude unattainable.

Moreover, after the development of the international economy, more workers were needed for the pre-industrial economies of Asia during the 19th century. A greater demand for labor was needed in Asia to power exports to growing industrial countries like the United States and Germany. Cultivation of cash crops like coffee, cocoa, and sugar and exploitation of minerals like gold and tin led farm owners to search for individuals in need of loans for the sake of keeping laborers permanently. In particular, the Indian indenture system was based on debt bondage by which an estimated two million Indians were transported to various colonies of European powers to provide labor for plantations. It started from the end of slavery in 1833 and continued until 1920.

Chinese-Moro mestizo historian Samuel Kong Tan wrote that on his home island of Siasi, the native Moro Muslims and Chinese had good relations. The Chinese sold guns to the Moros in exchange for marine products like shark fins, shells and pearls. The native Moros also took out loans from the Chinese creditors and with the Moros putting their women and guns up as collateral for the debts.

Moro Muslim parents from Cotabato in mainland Mindanao sold their children and slaves to Chinese merchants so the Chinese could later sell them in the Sulu Sultanate after Cotabato was hit by famine and smallpox in 1872. Jesuits stepped in by buying the children from the Chinese.

The Cotabato-based Jesuit mission lasted from 1862 until Spanish rule in Cotabato ended and during famine and disease epidemics they bought children from Muslim parents themselves or from Chinese merchants who had bought the children from the Muslim parents and placed them into a "ransomed slave children" orphanage. The Muslim datus sold their child slaves to the Jesuits during the famine in 1872. Thomas M. McKenna reported that he was told by Datu Adil that Moro Maguidanaons would send their slaves to schools instead of their own children in Cotabato when the Americans opened up schools so these slaves later became bureaucrats and teachers for the Magindanaons. In South Sulawesi in the Dutch East Indies, elite Toraja would also not send their own children to school and instead send their slaves.

=== Europe ===
==== Classical antiquity ====
Debt bondage was "quite normal" in classical antiquity. The poor or those who had fallen irredeemably in debt might place themselves into bondage "voluntarily"—or more precisely, might be compelled by circumstances to choose debt bondage as a way to anticipate and avoid worse terms that their creditors might impose on them. In the Greco-Roman world, debt bondage was a distinct legal category into which a free person might fall, in theory temporarily, distinguished from the pervasive practice of slavery, which included enslavement as a result of defaulting on debt. Many forms of debt bondage existed in both ancient Greece and ancient Rome.

==== Ancient Greece ====
Debt bondage was widespread in ancient Greece. The only city-state known to have abolished it is Athens, as early as the Archaic period under the debt reform legislation of Solon. Both enslavement for debt and debt bondage were practiced in Ptolemaic Egypt. By the Hellenistic period, the limited evidence indicates that debt bondage had replaced outright enslavement for debt.

The most onerous debt bondage was various forms of paramonē, "indentured labor." As a matter of law, a person subjected to paramonē was categorically free, and not a slave, but in practice his freedom was severely constrained by his servitude. Solon's reforms occurred in the context of democratic politics at Athens that required clearer distinctions between "free" and "slave"; as a perverse consequence, chattel slavery increased.

The selling of one's own child into slavery is likely in most cases to have resulted from extreme poverty or debt, but strictly speaking is a form of chattel slavery, not debt bondage. The exact legal circumstances in Greece, however, are more poorly documented than in ancient Rome.

==== Ancient Rome ====
Nexum was a debt bondage contract in the early Roman Republic. Within the Roman legal system, it was a form of mancipatio. Though the terms of the contract would vary, essentially a free man pledged himself as a bond slave (nexus) as surety for a loan. He might also hand over his son as collateral. Although the bondsman might be subjected to humiliation and abuse, as a legal citizen he was supposed to be exempt from corporal punishment. Nexum was abolished by the Lex Poetelia Papiria in 326 BC, in part to prevent abuses to the physical integrity of citizens who had fallen into debt bondage.

Roman historians illuminated the abolition of nexum with a traditional story that varied in its particulars; basically, a nexus who was a handsome but upstanding youth suffered sexual harassment by the holder of the debt. In one version, the youth had gone into debt to pay for his father's funeral; in others, he had been handed over by his father. In all versions, he is presented as a model of virtue. Historical or not, the cautionary tale highlighted the incongruities of subjecting one free citizen to another's use, and the legal response was aimed at establishing the citizen's right to liberty (libertas), as distinguished from the slave or social outcast.

Cicero considered the abolition of nexum primarily a political maneuver to appease the common people (plebs): the law was passed during the Conflict of the Orders, when plebeians were struggling to establish their rights in relation to the hereditary privileges of the patricians. Although nexum was abolished as a way to secure a loan, debt bondage might still result after a debtor defaulted.

==== European Middle Ages ====
While serfdom under feudalism was the predominant political and economic system in Europe in the High Middle Ages, persisting in the Austrian Empire till 1848 and the Russian Empire until 1861 (details), debt bondage (and slavery) provided other forms of unfree labour.

==== Russian Empire ====
Throughout the reign of Tsar Alexander II, Russia was dominated by reforms; Serfdom was abolished in 1861 after decades of subjection, granting over 23 million serfs their freedom as well as obtaining citizenship, marriage without permission, property rights along with business ownership. This was well received amongst the peasantry, whom labelled Alexander "the Liberator". This act was the first and most paramount of major reforms enacted during his reign. However, serfs became obligated towards labouring on the land in order to gain private ownership, thus rendering them heavily indebted. Moreover, the outward urban migration of the population from rural areas only made this more difficult to achieve, with peasants enduring similar, albeit greatly reduced, hardship as a result.

Despite that, peasants were enabled to purchase private property, and therefore begin soil cultivation for their own behalf, although this was also somewhat reduced by former tenants being forced to provide land redemption payments for the next several decades, whilst simultaneously being restricted to purchasing less fertile and profitable land without nobility interests. Furthermore, peasants were often overcharged for land beyond market value, often varying from every location, with almost all the peasantry whom obtained greater land amounts being within the Congress Poland, in order to weaken the dominant Polish nobility power structure. It has also been documented that many serfs remained heavily indebted, bound by their superior landlords, having acquired no significant liberty irrespective of the abolition reforms that were recently introduced. Nobility privileges were not affected, and, if anything, debatably strengthened.

Regardless of the Tsar's intentions, some have argued that the emancipation enactment merely benefitted the landowners as an extension of the nobility, in that dedicated compensation secured for the aforementioned greatly overestimated market value of their property. They also determined what they would surrender, with partial remains distributed between the serfs. Extortionately priced land meant that peasants only bought narrow areas difficult to preserve with barely any food or revenue. Landowners received additional financial compensation for land plots they yielded to serfs, contrary to the peasants having to pay for their own plots of land. This led to serfs having to borrow loans as well as mortgages off the State Bank and their landlords, the vast majority of which originating from the former issuer. In order to alleviate the heavy burden, they were tied towards labouring until their debts repaid; Debt consolidation was entirely absent. Land inventories were seized with allotments and payments calculated, since it legally belonged to the landlord, as peasants with government loans were required to redeem allotments from landlords, although redemption payment durations were almost half a century. Within the first 20 years of emancipation, almost all of their peasants had received their land, leading to redemptions becoming mandatory, although allotments were adequate enough. Notwithstanding of this, the domestic population explosion that occurred for the remainder of the 19th century exposed peasants to increased economic difficulties.

== Modern practice ==
Though the figures differ from those of the International Labour Organization, researcher Siddharth Kara has calculated the number of slaves in the world by type, and determined that at the end of 2011 there were 18 to 20.5 million bonded laborers. Bonded laborers work in industries today that produce goods including but not limited to frozen shrimp, bricks, tea, coffee, diamonds, marble, and apparel.

=== South Asia ===
Although India, Pakistan, Nepal and Bangladesh all have laws prohibiting debt bondage, figures by the Human Rights Watch in 1999 are drastically higher estimating 40 million workers, composed mainly of children, are tied to labor through debt bondage in India alone. It is estimated that 84 to 88% of the bonded laborers in the world are in South Asia.

==== Brick kilns ====
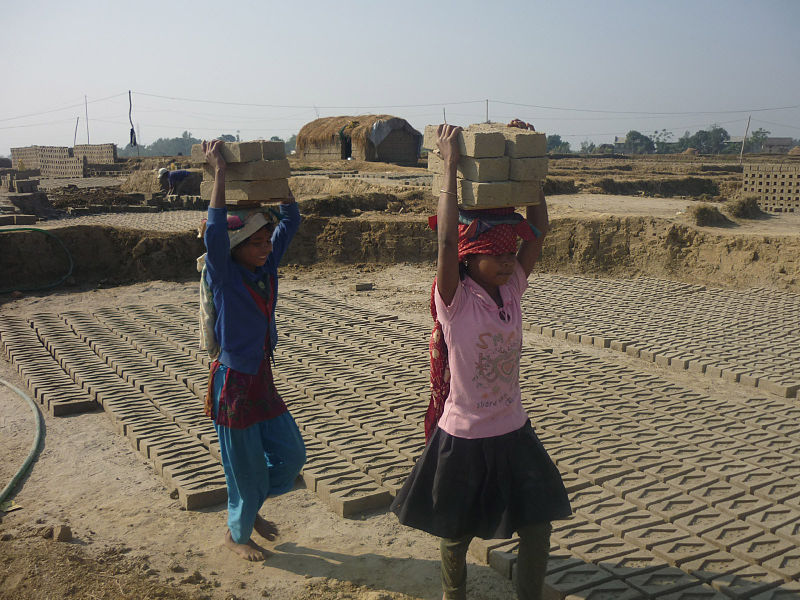
Child labor in brick kilns in Nepal

Research by Kara estimates there to be between 55,000 and 65,000 brick kiln workers in South Asia with 70% of them in India. Other research estimates 6,000 kilns in Pakistan alone. Total revenue from brick kilns in South Asia is estimated by Kara to be $13.3 to $15.2 billion. Many of the brick kiln workers are migrants and travel between brick kiln locations every few months. Kiln workers often live in extreme poverty and many began work at kilns through repayment of a starting loan averaging $150 to $200. Kiln owners offer laborers "friendly loans" to avoid being criminalized in breaking bonded labor laws. Bonded brick kiln laborers, including children, work in harsh and unsafe conditions as the heat from the kiln may cause heat stroke and a number of other medical conditions. Laborers are discouraged from defaulting on loans through fear of violence and death from brick kiln owners.

==== Rice harvesting ====
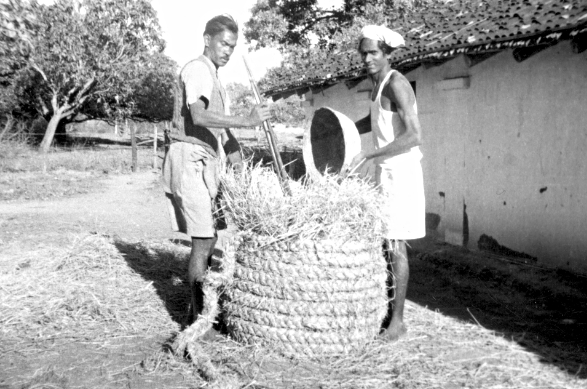
Workers storing rice in India in 1952

An essential grain to the South Asian diet, rice is harvested throughout India and Nepal in particular. In India, more than 20% of agricultural land is used to grow rice. Rice mill owners often employ workers who live in harsh conditions on farms. Workers receive such low wages that they must borrow money from their employers causing them to be tied to the rice mill through debt. For example, in India, the average pay rate per day was $0.55 American dollars as recorded in 2006. Though some workers may be able to survive minimally from their compensation, uncontrollable life events such as an illness require loans. Families, including children, work day and night to prepare the rice for export by boiling it, drying it in the sun, and sifting through it for purification. Furthermore, families who live on rice mill production sites are often excluded from access to hospitals and schools.

=== Western and Southern Africa ===
Though there are not reliable estimates of bonded laborers in Western and Southern Africa to date from credible sources, the Global Slavery Index estimates the total number of those enslaved in this region is 6.25 million. In countries like Ghana, it is estimated that 85% of people enslaved are tied to labor. Additionally, this region includes Mauritania, the country with the highest proportion of slavery in the world as an estimated 20% of its population is enslaved through methods like debt bondage.

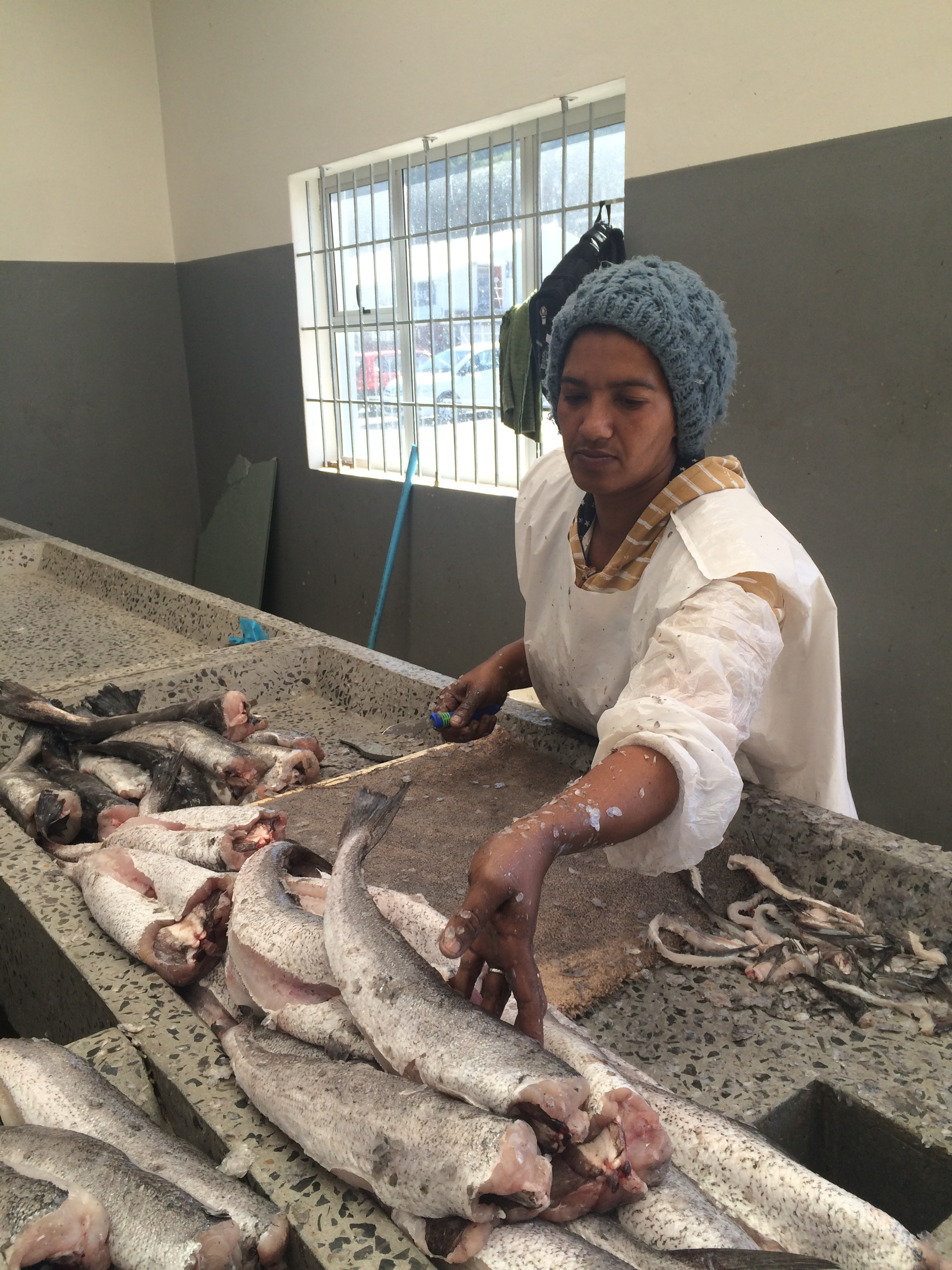
A worker preparing fish caught off the coast of South Africa

==== Fisheries ====
The Environmental Justice Foundation found human rights violations in the fisheries on the coasts of South and West Africa including labor exploitation. Exporter fish companies drive smaller businesses and individuals to lower profits, causing bankruptcy. In many cases, recruitment to these companies occurs by luring small business owners and migrant workers through debt bondage. In recruiting individual fishers, fees are sometimes charged by a broker to use ports which opens the debt cycle.

==== Domestic labour ====
After countries began to formally abolish slavery, unemployment was rampant for black people in South Africa and Nigeria pushing black women to work as domestic workers, largely to other black people. Currently, estimates from the International Labour Organization state that between 800,000 and 1.1 million domestic workers are in South Africa. Many of these domestic servants become bonded to labor in a process similar to other industries in Asia. The wages given to servants are often so poor that loans are taken when servants are in need of more money, making it impossible to escape. The hours of working for domestic servants are unpredictable, and because many servants are women, their young children are often left under the care of older children or other family members. Moreover, these women can work up to the age of 75 and their daughters are likely to be servants in the same households.

=== Prostitution ===
A 1994 report of Burmese prostitutes in Thailand reports compulsory indebtedness is common for girls in forced prostitution, especially those transported across the border. They are forced to work off their debt, often with 100 percent interest, and to pay for their room, food and other items. In addition to debt bondage, the women and girls face a wide range of abuses, including illegal confinement; forced labor; rape; physical abuse; and more.

== Consequences ==
=== Revenue ===
The International Labour Organization (ILO) estimates that $51.2 billion is made annually in the exploitation of workers through debt bondage. Though the employers actively take part in accruing the debt of laborers, buyers of products and services in the country of manufacturing and abroad also contribute to the profitability of this practice. Global supply chains that deliver goods throughout the world are most likely tainted with slave labor. The reason for this includes convoluted supply chain management that crosses many international borders, ineffective labor laws, corporates claiming plausible deniability, global political-economic restructuring and well-intended consumers. This effort to eradicate modern day slavery resonates with well meaning individuals who purchase fair-trade items, hoping they are making a difference. The fair trade industry is estimated to exceed $1.2 billion annually (Davenport & Low 2012). Unfortunately, this is barely a dent into the global economy. International labor laws need to be created by various authorities such as the International Labor Organization, World Trade Organization, Interpol and the United Nations that have teeth to adequately punish the wrongdoers.

=== On-going cycle ===
In many of the industries in which debt bondage is common like brick kilns or fisheries, entire families are often involved in paying of the debt of one individual, including children. These children generally do not have access to education thus making it impossible to get out of poverty. Moreover, if a relative who still is in debt dies, the bondage is passed on to another family member, usually the children. At the International Labour Organization Convention, this cycle was labeled as the "Worst Forms of Child Labor." Researchers like Basu and Chau link the occurrence of child labor through debt bondage with factors like labor rights and the stage of development of an economy. Although minimum age labor laws are present in many regions with child debt bondage, the laws are not enforced especially with regard to the agrarian economy.

== Policy initiatives ==
=== The United Nations ===
Debt bondage has been described by the United Nations as a form of "modern day slavery" and is prohibited by international law. It is specifically dealt with by article 1(a) of the United Nations 1956 Supplementary Convention on the Abolition of Slavery. It persists nonetheless especially in developing countries, which have few mechanisms for credit security or bankruptcy, and where fewer people hold formal title to land or possessions. According to some economists, like Hernando de Soto, this is a major barrier to development in these countries. For example, entrepreneurs do not dare to take risks and cannot get credit because they hold no collateral and may burden families for generations to come.

=== South Asia ===
India was the first country to pass legislation directly prohibiting debt bondage through the Bonded Labor System (Abolition) Act, 1976. Less than two decades later, Pakistan also passed a similar act in 1992 and Nepal passed the Kamaiya Labour (Prohibition) Act in 2002. Despite the fact that these laws are in place, debt bondage in South Asia is still widespread. According to the Ministry of Labor and Employment of the Government of India, there are over 300,000 bonded laborers in India, with a majority of them in the states of Tamil Nadu, Karnataka, and Odisha.

In India, the rise of Dalit activism, government legislation starting as early as 1949, as well as ongoing work by NGOs and government offices to enforce labour laws and rehabilitate those in debt, appears to have contributed to the reduction of bonded labour there. However, according to research papers presented by the International Labour Organization, there are still many obstacles to the eradication of bonded labour in India.

=== Sub-Saharan Africa ===
In many of the countries like South Africa, Nigeria, Mauritania, and Ghana in which debt bondage is prevalent, there are not laws that either state direct prohibition or specify punishment. In addition, though many of the countries in Sub-Saharan Africa have laws that vaguely prohibit debt bondage, prosecution of such crimes rarely occurs.

== See also ==
- Coolie
- Coolie trade
- Company store
- Debt relief
- Debtors' prison
- Indentured servitude
- Involuntary servitude
- Predatory lending
- Serfdom
- Trafficking of children
- Usury
- Worst Forms of Child Labour Convention

Contemporary

- Bonded Labour Liberation Front, India
- Chukri System
- Debt bondage in India
- Debt-trap diplomacy
- Modern day slavery
- Restavek, Haiti
- Siddharth Kara, Author
- The State of Bonded Labor in Pakistan
- Syeda Ghulam Fatima
- United Nations 1956 Supplementary Convention on the Abolition of Slavery
