= Bandhua Mukti Morcha =

Organization

Bandhua Mukti Morcha (BMM) (Hindi: बंधुआ मुक्ति मोर्चा, or Bonded Labour Liberation Front (BLLF) is a non-governmental organisation in India working to end bonded labour. Based in New Delhi, it was founded in 1981 by Swami Agnivesh who continued as its chairman until his death in 2020.

Bonded labour was legally abolished in India in 1976 but remains prevalent, with weak enforcement of the law by state governments. Estimates of the problem vary. Official figures include a 1993 estimate of 251,000 bonded labourers while BMM says there are 20 - 65 million bonded labourers. A 2003 project by Human Rights Watch has reported a major problem with bonded child labour in the silk industry.

== Achievements ==
BMM's efforts are credited with the passing of legislation to abolish child labour in India (the Child Labour (Prohibition and Regulation) Act 1986. This followed a 1984 Supreme Court decision in a case brought by BMM. Other cases on bonded labour brought to the Supreme Court by BMM have also extended the interpretation of the Constitution in areas of human rights.

== See also ==
- Iqbal Masih (1983–1995), spokesman for BMM from 1993–1995.
- Bachpan Bachao Andolan (South Asian Coalition on Child Servitude)
- Debt bondage in India
