= Kamal Kumbhar =

Indian social entrepreneur

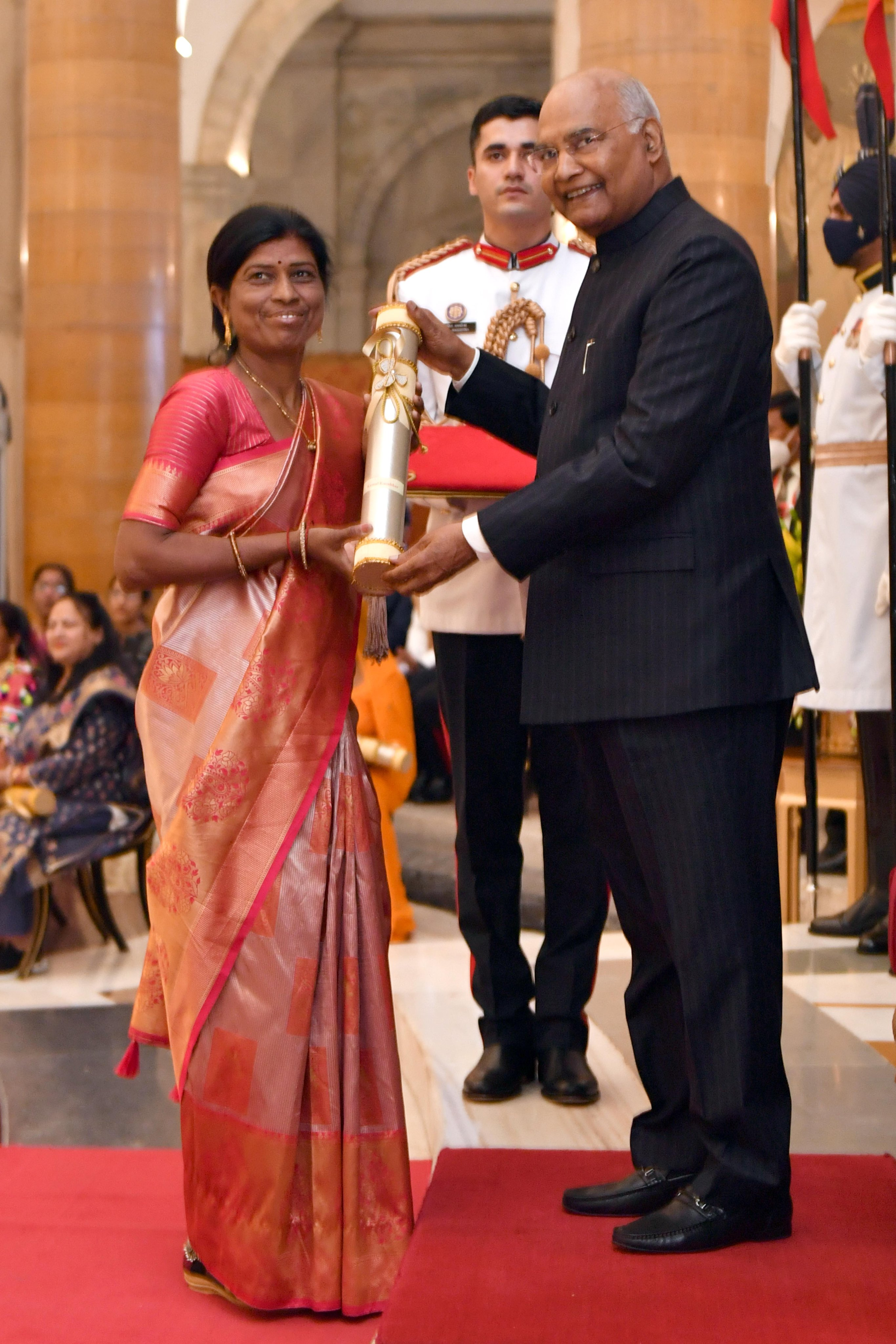
- Nari Shakti Puraskar to Kamal Kumbhar on 8 March 2022
- Born: Osmanabad, Maharashtra, India
- Occupation: Social entrepreneur
- Awards: Nari Shakti Puraskar (2021)

Kamal Kumbhar is an Indian social entrepreneur and founder of Kamal Poultry and Ekta Producer Company. She was awarded the Nari Shakti Puraskar, India's highest civilian honor for women, in 2021 for her contributions to promoting women's entrepreneurship in the field of animal husbandry.

== Early life ==
Kamal Kumbhar was born in Osmanabad, Maharashtra to a daily-wage labourer. She lived in poverty and grew up without access to education. She married at a young age and after that failed, she was financially vulnerable.

== Career ==
Kumbhar joined women's self-help groups and started a small business selling bangles from an investment of ₹500 (US$5.90). Two years later, she was leading a women's federation in Maharashtra.

She started Kamal Poultry and Ekta Producer Company in 1998 with no knowledge of business or marketing, with an investment of ₹2,000 (US$24). The company sells about Rs 1 lakh every month. She has mentored more than 5,000 women from her state to set up similar enterprises and become self-sufficient.

In 2012, she became a clean energy entrepreneur and lit up over 3000 homes with solar-powered devices, after training as an "Energy Sakhi" in SSP's "women in clean energy program", which trained over 1100 women across Maharashtra and Bihar. She owns six business ventures earning the moniker "serial entrepreneur". She owns a range of agriculture-allied businesses.

== Awards ==
- CII Foundation's Woman Exemplar award from President Pranab Mukherjee
- Women Transforming India Award (2017), organized by United Nations and NITI Aayog.
- Nari Shakti Puraskar (2021)
