= Manu Singh =

Indian Meditation Expert

Dr Manu Singh
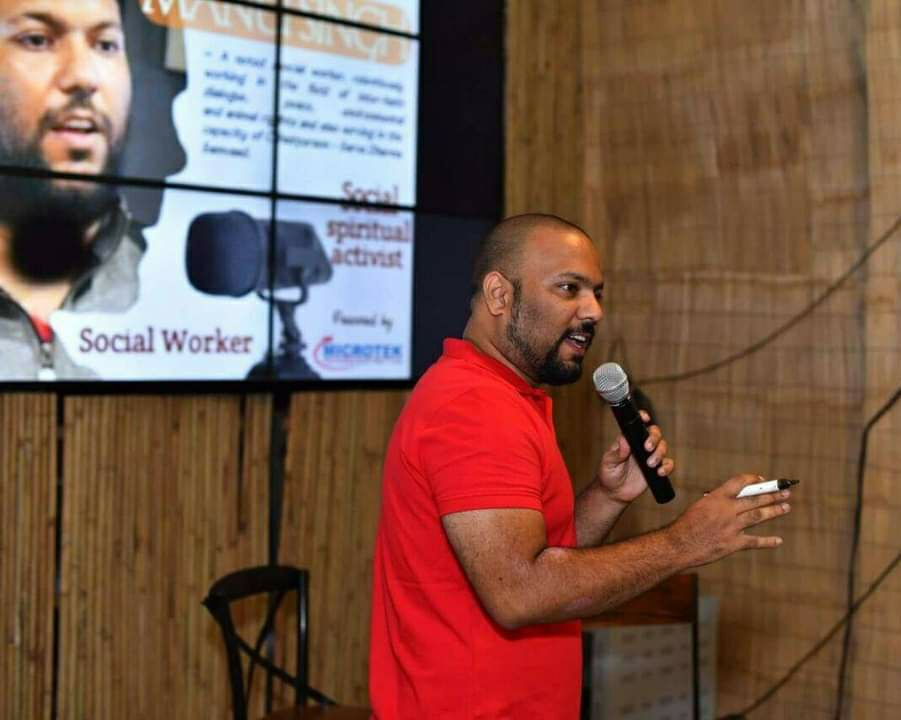
- Born: Manu Singh; 21 May 1983 (age 43); Dehradun, Uttarakhand, India
- Occupations: Environmentalist, social activist, Interfaith activist, Meditation Guru
- Parent(s): Anoop Singh and Indu Bala

Manu Singh (मनु सिंह ) is an environmentalist and a social justice and peace activist. He is a spiritual trainer, experimenting with a variety of meditative techniques, and a renowned interfaith practitioner. Currently he is the Chairperson of Sarva Dharma Samvaad, a holistic well-being organisation. He is a columnist for Holistic living, Eco-spirituality and Meditative living.

== Early life ==
Singh was born in Dehradun, Uttarakhand on 21 May 1983 to Anoop Singh and Indu Bala. He completed his schooling from Riverdale High School, Dehradun. He pursued higher education from Jawaharlal Nehru University.

== Career ==
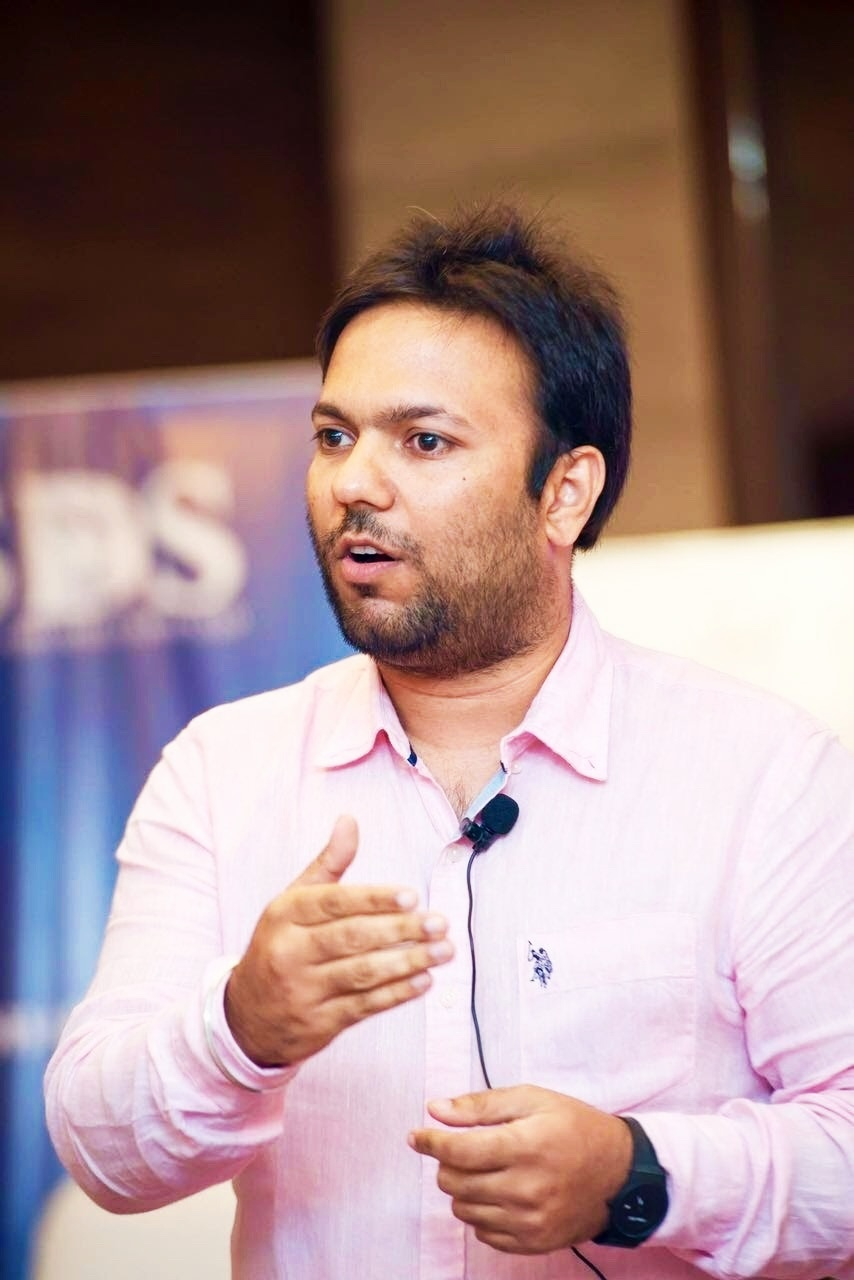
Manu Singh addressing a gathering in an event on interfaith harmony

=== Meditation Guru ===
Singh is a meditation and mindfulness practitioner, who teaches meditative living using eastern techniques. His method combines scientific aptitude and decantative spiritual wisdom. He emphasises on holistic wellbeing, physical, mental, emotional, spiritual, social and beyond. His concept of mindfulness and meditation is not limited to time or space, rather the idea of evolving focuses on encapsulating everything that is within and around oneself.

Singh has propounded that the most dangerous form of pollution is that of human consciousness and not air, water, soil or noise. In his theory the world is a vast ocean of conscious interconnectedness, where every particle resonates and oscillates with the entire ocean and itself. All living entities, as conscious and vibratory beings, are not separate from this ocean, but when we overtly invest in our egos, we develop an illusion of separateness. This illusion leads us onto the path of disconnection from this conscious interconnectedness and we turn into a contaminant, a toxin for this entire creation.

Singh believes that health is a way of living, a state of existence that encompasses everything from one’s relationships, career, physical and mental activities and spiritual practises. Above all, health and happiness are in a unified marriage, and one cannot function in the absence of the other.

=== Eco spirituality ===
Singh claims that the entire existence is an interconnected web and the pollution of one's own consciousness leads to the disruption of everything around us. The solution according to him is to address this pollution of our consciousness which arises out of the overfeeding the human ego is to invest mindfully in eco-centrism: a way of life that recognizes and respects the life and sentience in every vibratory particle of the entire multiverse. Once this realization is inculcated, humans develop the forces of Satva through which they can download the deep love and compassion embedded within the entire cosmos and lead an integral life of Ahimsa (Non-Violence), Karuna (Compassion), Satvikta (Simplicity), and Aparigraha (renunciation).

His techniques inclusively focus on the well-being of every living being intending to promote a sustainable living rather than an anthropocentric approach towards life. He suggests that nations should join forces for the greater good of the ecosystem, for cleaner energies, and reduction in deforestation. He emphasises that the pandemic (COVID-19) was a result of our current lifestyle and that we must radically and consciously alter it.

=== Environmentalism ===
Singh has been vocal about the issues that he feels need immediate attention and has condemned the development narrative for its lack of sustainable planning. He has been a panelist news platforms. He has taken various sessions on climate change and its effects, and drawn the attention of youth towards the interconnectedness of nature and has been promoting sustainable living for all. His scientific temper and understanding of the history of earth and humanity lends support to his audience in connecting to his cause.

Singh has been extremely critical of the meat industry and elaborate sessions that encourage people to adopt a vegan or vegetarian lifestyle, both for personal well-being and for the well-being of the planet.

Singh has been raising awareness about the disastrous AQI in Delhi NCR every year during the advent of winters. He speaks about holistic solutions rather than knee jerk symptomatic reactions and speaks against Diwali crackers, illegal constructions, Stubble burning etc.

== Animal welfare and rights ==
Since 2002, Singh has been engaged in animal welfare activities, particularly in Delhi, where he has fed and cared for stray animals. He is a vocal advocate of the idea of shared space in urban development, opposing what he describes as an anthropocentric model of city planning. In 2025, following a Supreme Court decision on the removal of stray dogs from the streets of Delhi, Singh was one of the first to write to the Court, arguing against the order. He described the decision as "anti-Sanatan" and "anti-Hindu" and stressed its legal, scientific, and moral shortcomings.

Singh has also been critical of the management of India’s national parks. He has spoken against what he considers the influence of illegal mining interests and unsustainable tourism in protected areas, particularly in Ranthambore, where he has written on the shifting role of tigers from protectors of cultural heritage sites to predators under ecological stress.

=== Interfaith Harmony ===
Singh founded the NGO – Sarva Dharma Samvaad to work towards harmony among various religions in India. The concept of Sarva Dharma Samvaad was to work on a common minimum programme, with leaders of various faiths to crusade against several social ills. He partnered with the United Nations, URI, HWPL, Art of Living and KAICIID, organising conventions and programmes centered around interfaith dialogue in India. Through Sarva Dharma Samvaad he conducted several workshops and trainings focussing on media and information literacy, advocacy trainings and workshops, methodological workshops at various platforms and levels, partnering with several organizations.

He convened the Sarva Dharm Sansad in 2008 inviting leaders of various religions on a common platform with the agenda to come together and work together for social amelioration. He also directed a socio- spiritual talk show titled Vichar Manthan on Lok Sabha TV, which brought about several experts from the civil society to discuss on the various social problems and their respective solutions and then also anchored and directed a TV show on similar lines titled Ved Manthan on Sadhna TV.

=== Social Movements ===
He has been honorary consultant of Bandha Mukti Morcha, an internationally acclaimed NGO working against bonded labors in the India and a convener of Anupam Sarva Sewa Samiti which is working in kumaon (uttarakhand) for the upliftment of the hilly people.

Singh served as the media secretary and chief of the youth wing of the World Council of Arya Samaj, an organisation distinct from Dayananda's Arya Samaj.

He was one of the initial members of the India Against Corruption movement and remained an active participant until the movement transformed from one of social betterment to a movement of attaining political power. His powerful poetry recitation and speeches were very famous amongst the crowd.

He worked with several social activists as a mediator for the release of 5 Policemen who were abducted by maoists in Chhattisgarh on Feb.11, 2011. During this mission of mediation He had to walk through several miles of the dangerous Bastar forests in the so-called Liberated maoist zones

He has been an animal rights activist and involved in promoting compassion and care for all living creatures. He also organised campaigns to ban slaughter of animals in the name of religion and for promoting vegetarianism. He was actively involved in the movement to ban the Gadhimai animal sacrifice in Nepal and also has been instrumental in saving camels during the Eidul Adha sacrifices. He raised voice against slaughterhouses in Gurgaon and animal slaughter in Gandhimai in Nepal. His session titled Varenyam encourages youth for adopting a lifestyle that causes minimum suffering to animals and also helps protect the environment. Varenyam has received great support from eminent sportspersons like ace badminton player Saina Nehwal, wrestler Rajeev Tomer and UFC champion and Hollywood star Randy Couture, Dolph Lundgren, Jonty Rhodes etc.

== Other activities ==
He won and consequently was part of the jury for Hult Prize in India, given by an institution under the patronship of former US President Bill Clinton;
