= Samuel K. Tan =

Filipino historian and author (1933–2022)

- Born: Samuel Kong Tan; December 30, 1933; Siasi, Sulu, Philippine Islands
- Died: January 6, 2022 (aged 88)
- Occupations: Historian, academic, author

Samuel Kong Tan (December 30, 1933 – January 6, 2022) was a Filipino historian, academic and author. He has headed various cultural institutions including the National Historical Institute and the National Commission for Culture and the Arts.

== Early life and education ==
Samuel K. Tan was born on December 30, 1933, in Siasi, Sulu. He has a multi-ethnic background being of Tausūg-Sama and Chinese Filipino descent.

He finished his elementary studies at Jolo Tong Jin School in 1949 and his secondary studies at Zamboanga City High School in 1953. He graduated as a valedictorian from both elementary and high school. He attended the Zamboanga A.E. College in 1963 where he graduated in 1963 with a degree in history and summa cum laude honors. He obtained his master's degree in history at the University of the Philippines Diliman in 1967. For his doctoral degree, Tan went to the United States to attend the Maxwell School of Citizenship and Public Affairs at the Syracuse University in New York. He obtained his doctorate degree in social science in 1973.

== Career ==
Tan has been a faculty member of the University of the Philippines, having served as the chair of the institution's Department of History.

Tan is noted for serving as the executive director of the National Historical Institute, (NHI; now the National Historical Commission of the Philippines or NHCP) from 1997 to 1999. Under his watch the NHI, the curatorial content of the Museum of Philippine History which opened in 1995 has been expanded, which was later moved to the Museo ng Kasaysayang Pampulitika ng Pilipinas in Malolos, Bulacan.

He has been a member of other culture and history-oriented organizations such as the Philippine National Historical Society and the Philippine Historical Association. He has also acted as commissioner of the National Centennial Commission and the National Commission for Culture and the Arts (NCCA).

As an author, he has published books which had Filipino Muslims and the Bangsamoro struggle and self-determinism as their primary subject. Among his noted publications are A History of the Philippines (1987/1997), Decolonization and Filipino Muslim Identity (1989), The Critical Decade, 1921-1930 (1993), and The Filipino-American War, 1899-1913 (2002).

== Death ==
During the COVID-19 pandemic in the Philippines, Tan died from complications of the virus on January 6, 2022, at the age of 88. He had pre-existing underlying conditions, including diabetes and cardiovascular disease.
