= Sumangali (child labour) =

Form of child labour in India

Sumangali is a form of child labour which, although forbidden, is practised in India, particularly the textile industry in Tamil Nadu. It is likened to soft trafficking, a less explicit form of human trafficking. In the scheme, a girl is hired on contract for three to five years, during which she earns a wage, and after which she is paid a lump sum to pay for a dowry. It is said to have originated in Coimbatore in the late 1990s.

The scheme is also known as Sumungali scheme, Sumungali Thittam, Suba Mangala scheme, Subha Mangala scheme, Mangalya Thittam, Thirumangalam thiruman thittam, the marriage scheme, and the camp coolie system. The term Sumangali means "married woman" or "happily married woman" in Tamil. It refers to a "single girl becoming a respectable woman through marriage".

== Recruitment ==
A recruiter visits households of prospective young female labourers and discusses with the girl and her parents the benefits of Sumangali work. Most of the target girls are from poor families, and usually between 15 and 18 years old. Benefits offered may include three meals a day, air conditioning, a swimming pool, and free movies, all available at the employer's dormitory. They may also offer a bonus to be paid at the end of the contract. The recruiter is paid a commission for each girl hired by the textile manufacturer. Some girls are taken without their parents' consent.

More than 80 percent of recruits are hired for work in spinning mills. The remainder work in garment manufacturing.

== Work ==
Once hired on contract, the girls move into a company-controlled compound, and are trained for their jobs as apprentices. The compounds are kept under surveillance, and the girls are rarely permitted to leave and have little contact with their families. The girls are required to work long shifts in noisy factories, are subjected to verbal and physical abuse, and are paid low wages. The girls are expected to work 12-hour shifts six days a week, and sometimes additional night shifts or overtime.

The purpose of the compound is to prevent contact between the girls and union activists, and to supervise the activities of the employees. To leave the compound during their employment, they must be accompanied by a warden. The girls are permitted to visit their family during Diwali and Thai Pongal. According to the Tirupur People's Forum, the compounds are dingy and dusty, and may be repurposed buildings, such as poultry barns.

Some employers in this industry may also require the girls work a minimum of 26 days a month, and deduct from their wages fifteen rupees per day for missing a single day. The starting wage is 34 rupees a day, increasing by 2 rupees per day every six months to a maximum of 45 rupees per day. From this wage, deductions are made by the employer for employer-mandated lodging and meals at the compound, typically 450–550 rupees per month.

The bonus promised to them is also deducted from their wages, a form of debt bondage illegal in India since 1976, and is to be part of a dowry, illegal in India since 1961. Few girls obtain the bonus, as most are injured or become ill and are fired, or simply wear out and quit. Most that approach the employment duration for the bonus are "fired for some pretext or another", such as for contacting union activists. As the girls are considered apprentices, the manufacturers calculate the girls' wages with respect to minimum wage laws as the combined contract salary and future bonus.

== Activism ==
According to Terre des hommes and other humanitarian organisations, this scheme enables exploitation of the girls, some of whom are beaten, starved, or sexually assaulted. Accidents caused by use of outdated or poorly maintained machinery are common, usually resulting in cuts to the fingers or hands, and sometimes amputation. There is a high rate of suicide amongst Sumangali workers.

As of 2013, approximately 120,000 girls and young women have been hired under the Sumangali system. The Campaign Against Sumangali Scheme began in Tirunelveli and ended in Tirupur on 21 December 2012. It was conducted to raise awareness amongst the poor likely to be exploited by the scheme. Because the garment industry requires low-skill labour, there is often little chance for personal and skills development, and the girls become "dispensable" labour.

The Sumangali scheme is described as a side effect of child labour laws in India preventing the employment of children less than fifteen years old. As a result, there has been an increase in the employment of adolescents between fifteen and eighteen years old.

In the report Understanding the Characteristics of the Sumangali Scheme in Tamil Nadu Textile & Garment Industry and Supply Chain Linkages, the Fair Labor Association listed a number of issues related to the Sumangali scheme:

- lack of a written employment contract
- girls employed as apprentices, paid a stipend instead of a wage
- significant and required deductions
- no company payment for the Provident Fund or Employees' State Insurance
- little or no training, resulting in low health and safety awareness
- long shift work, often 12 hours
- compulsory overtime and extension of shift work
- gender discrimination for wages; boys and men are paid more for equivalent work
- commonly exposed to verbal abuse
- infrequently subjected to physical abuse or sexual abuse
- forced labour and debt bondage

== Reaction ==
Some fashion design houses that source textiles from Tamil Nadu, or from suppliers that do so, have taken action regarding the scheme. C&A suspended one of its supplier accounts it had determined was practicing the Sumangali scheme, and later closed it when the supplier would not terminate the practice. It also stated that Sumangali work had shifted to "earlier parts of the textile chain", especially spinning mills outside the purview of their auditors. It has also joined a Terre des hommes project and is part of the Brands Ethical Working Group. Ted Baker issued a press release stating it was not aware of any Sumangali work within its supply chain, but that it could "play an important role in condemning practices like these". It joined with other brands in support of Anti-Slavery International and the Centre for Research on Multinational Corporations (SOMO).

The companies ASOS.com, Bestseller, C&A, Cortefiel, H&M, Mothercare, Next plc, Primark, and Tesco issued a press release condemning the practice, and stating that their suppliers would be required to "demonstrate, in a transparent manner, satisfactory employment practices and working conditions". These companies had been identified in several reports criticizing their supply chain practices, as were those of Asda (and owner Walmart), Diesel, Inditex, Old Navy (and owner Gap Inc.), Marks & Spencer, s.Oliver, The Timberland Company, and Tommy Hilfiger Corporation.

== See also ==
- Caste system in India
