= Siasi =

Municipality in Sulu, Philippines

Siasi سِئَسِ
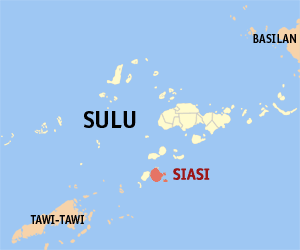
- Map of Sulu with Siasi highlighted
- OpenStreetMap
- Location within the Philippines
- Coordinates: 5°32′46″N 120°48′52″E
- Country: Philippines
- Region: Zamboanga Peninsula
- Province: Sulu
- District: 2nd district
- Established: February 11, 1904
- Barangays: 50 (see Barangays)

Government
  - Type: Sangguniang Bayan
  - Mayor: Ben-Sayeed M. Muksan
  - Vice Mayor: Arnashrif M. Muksan
  - Representative: Munir Napii Arbison Jr.
  - City Council: Members: Jurupin P. Pungutan; Meriannly A. Muksan; Herdan S. Hasinon; Willy A. Juhuri; Queriza J. Anni; Al-Mudzhar J. Arasain; Akjal A. Nassal; Tulawie H. Putalan
  - Electorate: 33,415 voters (2025)

Area
  - Total: 192.87 km^{2} (74.47 sq mi)
- Elevation: 52 m (171 ft)
- Highest elevation: 490 m (1,610 ft)
- Lowest elevation: 0 m (0 ft)

Population (2024 census)
  - Total: 100,076
  - Density: 518.88/km^{2} (1,343.9/sq mi)
  - Households: 14,464

Economy
  - Income class: 1st municipal income class
  - Poverty incidence: 25.4% (2023)
  - Revenue: ₱ 300.1 million (2022)
  - Assets: ₱ 491.1 million (2022)
  - Expenditure: ₱ 243.9 million (2022)
  - Liabilities: ₱ 242 million (2022)

Service provider
  - Electricity SIASI ELECTRIC COOPERATIVE (SIASELCO): Sulu Electric Cooperative (SULECO)
- Time zone: UTC+8 (PST)
- ZIP code: 7412
- PSGC: 1906612000
- IDD : area code: +63 (0)68
- Native languages: Sama; Tausug; Tagalog
- Website: www.siasi.gov.ph

Siasi, officially the Municipality of Siasi, Province of Sulu (Tausūg: Kawman sin Siasi; Filipino: lungsod ng Siasi), is a Municipality in the province of Sulu, Philippines. According to the 2024 census, it has a population of 100,076 people.

== Geography ==
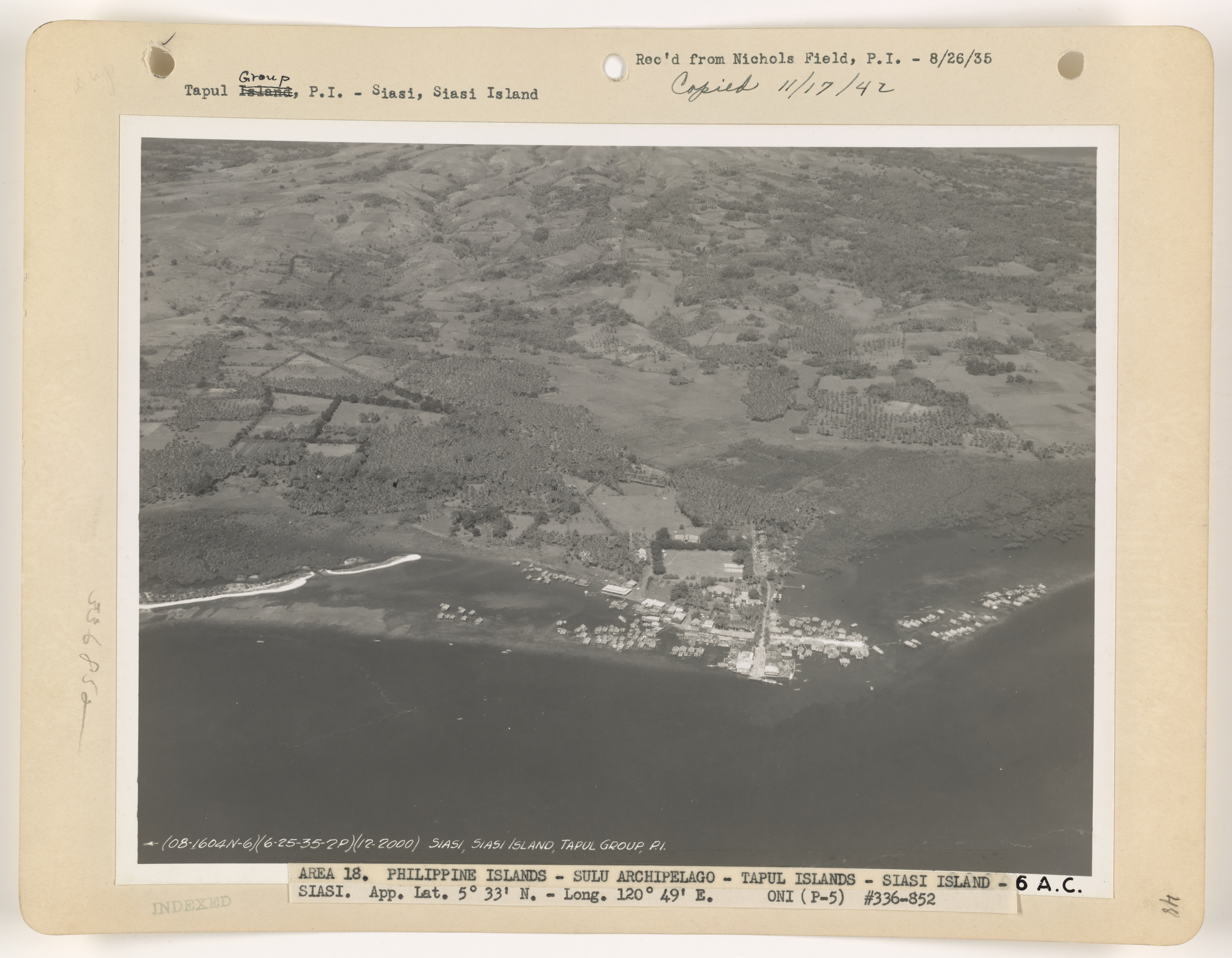
Aerial view of Siasi, 1935

=== Barangays ===
Siasi is politically subdivided into 50 barangays. Each barangay consists of puroks while some have sitios.

- Bakud
- Buan
- Bulansing Tara
- Bulihkullul
- Campo Islam
- Duggo
- Duhol Tara
- East Kungtad
- East Sisangat
- Ipil
- Jambangan
- Kabubu
- Kong-Kong Laminusa
- Kud-kud
- Kungtad West
- Latung
- Luuk Laminusa
- Luuk Tara
- Manta
- Minapan
- Nipa-nipa
- North Laud
- North Manta
- North Musu Laud
- North Silumpak
- Pislong
- Poblacion (Campo Baro)
- Punungan
- Puukan Laminusa
- Ratag
- Sablay
- Sarukot
- Siburi
- Singko
- Siokalan
- Siowing
- Sipanding
- Sisangat
- Siundoh
- South Musu Laud
- South Silumpak
- Southwestern Bulikullul
- Subah Buaya
- Tampakan Laminusa
- Tengah Laminusa
- Tong Laminusa
- Tong-tong
- Tonglabah
- Tubig Kutah
- Tulling

=== Climate ===
Climate data for Siasi, Sulu
Month	Jan	Feb	Mar	Apr	May	Jun	Jul	Aug	Sep	Oct	Nov	Dec	Year
Mean daily maximum °C (°F)	27 (81)	27 (81)	27 (81)	28 (82)	29 (84)	28 (82)	28 (82)	28 (82)	28 (82)	28 (82)	28 (82)	28 (82)	28 (82)
Mean daily minimum °C (°F)	27 (81)	26 (79)	27 (81)	27 (81)	28 (82)	28 (82)	28 (82)	28 (82)	28 (82)	28 (82)	28 (82)	27 (81)	28 (81)
Average precipitation mm (inches)	184 (7.2)	143 (5.6)	144 (5.7)	136 (5.4)	240 (9.4)	301 (11.9)	272 (10.7)	253 (10.0)	183 (7.2)	265 (10.4)	246 (9.7)	208 (8.2)	2,575 (101.4)
Average rainy days	18.6	15.8	16.9	15.7	23.3	24.2	24.6	23.2	20.5	23.0	22.2	20.4	248.4
Source: Meteoblue (modeled/calculated data, not measured locally)

== Demographics ==
Population census of Siasi
Year	Pop.	±% p.a.
1903	17,102	—
1918	4,809	−8.11%
1939	29,259	+8.98%
1948	29,836	+0.22%
1960	39,279	+2.32%
1970	51,425	+2.73%
1975	28,077	−11.43%
1980	50,336	+12.38%
1990	46,468	−0.80%
1995	50,655	+1.63%
2000	59,069	+3.35%
2007	63,518	+1.01%
2010	64,229	+0.41%
2015	67,705	+1.01%
2020	81,689	+4.03%
2024	100,076	+4.99%
Source: Philippine Statistics Authority

== Economy ==
Poverty Incidence of Siasi

Source: Philippine Statistics Authority

== Notable people ==
- Abdulmari Imao – National Artist of the Philippines for Visual Arts – Sculpture
- Samuel K. Tan - Historian and educator, chairman of the National Historical Institute from 1997 to 1999
- Maria Lourdes Sereno - former Chief Justice of the Supreme Court of the Philippines
- Ongina - drag performer, participated in the first season of RuPaul's Drag Race
- Santanina Rasul - former Senator of the Philippines
