= Cut the Rope: Triple Treat =

2014 video game

- Developer: ZeptoLab
- Publisher: Activision
- Series: Cut the Rope
- Platform: Nintendo 3DS
- Release: March 25, 2014
- Genre: Puzzle
- Mode: Single-player

Cut the Rope: Triple Treat is a physics-based puzzle video game developed by ZeptoLab and published by Activision for the Nintendo 3DS. The game serves as a compilation, featuring three titles from the Cut the Rope series: Cut the Rope (2010), Cut the Rope: Experiments (2011), and Cut the Rope: Time Travel (2013).

== Gameplay ==
Similar to the three titles aforementioned, the premise of the games is to get the candy to a green monster named Om Nom by cutting the ropes in a particular order while utilizing the game's physics to get the candy to Om Nom.

The game also supports online leaderboards and in-game achievements.

== Critical reception ==
Professional ratings
Aggregate scores
Source	Rating
Metacritic	64/100
Review scores
Source	Rating
Digitally Downloaded	2.5/5
FNintendo	6/10
GameRevolution	3.5/5
Nintendo Life	7/10

Cut the Rope: Triple Treat received mixed reviews from critics. According to the review aggregator Metacritic, Cut the Rope: Triple Treat received "mixed or average reviews" based on a weighted average score of 64 out of 100 from 4 critic scores.

Nick H. of Digitally Downloaded said, "It has a style of play that allows it to be incredibly challenging if you are going for as many stars as quickly as possible, but it also allows you to feed Om Nom and move on to the next level - handy for younger players." Nuno Nêveda of FNintendo said, "Cut the Rope: Triple Treat is not harmed by its gameplay, its controls or its technical aspects. What keeps it from being a more prominent and recommended title for those who seek short, fun gaming sessions, is its business model. A compilation of three games, including two previously released on the mobile market, does not justify its high price tag." KevinS of GameRevolution said, "So for a budget-price game you definitely do get your money's worth." Martin Watts of Nintendo Life said, "With three games' worth of content all stuffed on to a single 3DS card, Cut the Rope: Triple Treat is certainly the best entry in the series that you can pick up for the system."

According to Pocket Gamer, the game "boasts some ridiculously cute 3D visuals".
