= Om Nom Stories =

Cartoon web series

- Genre: Comedy; Adventure; Slapstick
- Based on: Cut the Rope
- Written by: Arkady Shumarin; Dmitry Gorbunov; Stanislav Mikhailov
- Directed by: Arthur Merkulov
- Country of origin: United Kingdom
- Original language: English
- No. of seasons: 29
- No. of episodes: 288

Production
- Executive producer: Dmitry Gorbunov
- Producers: Semyon Voinov; Dmitry Gorbunov; Pavel Muntyan
- Running time: 1 minute (seasons 1–3); 2 minutes (seasons 4–7); 2-3 minutes (seasons 8–present)
- Production companies: ZeptoLab UK; Toonbox (seasons 1–3); Rocket Fox (seasons 4–22); Metaxilasis (seasons 23–present)

Original release
- Network: YouTube
- Release: 24 October 2012 – present

Om Nom Stories (sometimes called Om Nom) is a cartoon web series produced by Zeptolab, featuring the character Om Nom from the video game series Cut the Rope. The series revolves around Om Nom's life out of the game, and is based on 4 games in the series: the original, Cut the Rope: Time Travel, Cut the Rope 2, and Cut the Rope: Magic. The first season, as well as the first and last episodes of the second (Time Travel), combine live action and animation, while the rest are entirely animated. It premiered on YouTube on 9 December 2011.

== Production ==
On December 9, 2011, ZeptoLab released a pilot to satisfy the fans' demand for more content with Om Nom. The pilot's success prompted the production and release of the first season, which was aired from October 24, 2012 within the Cut the Rope and Cut the Rope: Experiments apps, ZeptoLab YouTube channel, and in over 19,000 US movie theatres as part of an exclusive partnership with National CineMedia (NCM)'s FirstLook pre-show.

In October 2021, it was announced that a spin-off series titled Eve and Om Nom: Delivery Duo was in development and was set to be co-produced by ZeptoLab and StoryTime. The series follows Om Nom running a parcel delivery service with his new human best friend Eve. The series' first season was ordered for 52 5-minute episodes. However, the idea has since gotten scrapped and turned into an original IP titled Eva and Tuk-Tuk: Delivery Duo, which effectively follows the same premise.

In 2022, production of the series was moved to the Metaxilasis animation studio.

== Broadcast ==
The show has aired on CITV and Toons.TV in the United Kingdom and United States respectively between 2014 and 2017, as well as Ketchup TV since 2014. In October 2018, the series' first five seasons were acquired by Turner Broadcasting System for distribution in Latin American regions. On August 12, 2019, the spin-off short series Learn English with Om Nom started broadcasting as part of BatteryPOP broadcasts on the former Qubo network. On March 26, 2020, it was announced that Om Nom Stories would start airing on Azteca 7 in Latin America in May, and also be released on Totalplay and on LATAM Airlines’ in-flight system. On August 1, 2023, seasons 2, 4, and 15 were released on Netflix. In February 2024, it was announced that the first 25 seasons of the series were acquired by Disney+ to be released in Europe in Q4 of 2024. It was later added to the platform on October 5, 2024. On June 19, 2024, it was announced that German company Your Family Entertainment had struck a deal with ZeptoLab to have Om Nom Stories released on Fix&Foxi TV.

== Plot ==
The series chronicles the daily antics, exploits and adventures of Om Nom, a friendly and curious green blob-like monster. Most episodes center around Om Nom trying to relax or enjoy himself, only for his plans to get ruined and often sidetracked by the people around him and the adventures that he gets himself into. Om Nom is usually accompanied by his girlfriend Om Nelle, their mischievous and rambunctious son Nibble Nom, and various other miscellaneous supporting characters.

=== Super-Noms (seasons 8–14) ===
One day, a superhero in space was washing his clothes when suddenly, an asteroid crashed into his ship, causing his clothes to crash-land on earth. Om Nom and Om Nelle discover his possessions and decide to put them to good use, helping to save the world and protect their community against numerous villains, most notably an evil spider named Evil Spider who wishes to rule the world, only for the Super Noms to foil him every time. A total of 70 new episodes were produced during this period.

=== Nibble-Nom (seasons 15–17) ===
One day, Om Nom and Om Nelle are looking for danger and excitement in their superhero personas as the Super Noms, when a stork drops a package containing an adorable, yet mischievous and troublemaking child/baby named Nibble Nom whose outrageous fantasies often put Om Nom and Om Nelle at the forefront. A total of 30 new episodes were produced during this period.

=== Om Nom Cafe (seasons 18–19) ===
The Noms' cooking skills culminate with a disaster that leaves them homeless. Just when all hope seems lost, the locals' enjoyment of their food prompt them to open a new restaurant called Om Nom Cafe. There, they sell food and drinks, all while invariably getting into mishaps and hijinks along the way. A total of 20 new episodes were produced during this period.

=== New Neighbors (seasons 20–26) ===
The Noms move into a neighborhood called Nomcity featuring various new and eccentric characters. Even when they're away from Nomville, the Noms aren't safe from being caught up in comical escapades and predicaments. A total of 70 new episodes were produced during this period.

=== Fantasy Quest (season 27) ===
Om Nom, Nibble-Nom, and now Evil Spider have gathered to a poker table. However, whenever they plant three cards on the table, they're suddenly whisked away to whole-new fantastical worlds with whole-new fantastical shenanigans to get up to. 11 episodes from this period were released.

=== Nomville (seasons 28–present) ===
After a 14-month hiatus, the series returns with an all-new season: Nomville, which seems to blend the settings of Nomville from seasons 8–19 with that of Nomcity from seasons 20–27.

== Characters ==
=== Main ===
- Om Nom: Om Nom is a green blob-like monster who can seemingly never escape the madness and adventures he's thrown into at the blink of an eye. While he's presented in the early seasons as mischievous, hyperactive and rambunctious to an extent, he's later rewritten to be approachable and laid-back but somewhat slow-witted, impulsive and childish around Season 6. Om Nom is characterized most often though as being just as capable at getting himself into situations as much as he can get himself out of them.
- Om Nelle: Om Nelle is Om Nom's love interest and girlfriend around Seasons 4 or 5. As opposed to Om Nom's bumbling persona, Om Nelle is considered and often is shown to be more capable, independent and mature than him and is often the one who corrects him and has to rescue him from his peril. In spite of their constant disagreements, she and Om Nom share a loving relationship with one another. Originally being a side character, she would soon evolve into one of the show's primary characters, until Season 20, where she's once again pushed to the side.
- Nibble Nom: Introduced in Season 15, Om Nom and Om Nelle's son Nibble Nom characterizes Om Nom's personality in the early seasons: purely mischievous, rambunctious and hyperactive. Most of Nibble Nom's grandiose persona comes from the fantasy sequences he and Om Nom often go through, usually as a result of an ordinary family matter (Nibble-Nom having to stop playing a video game for the night and go to bed) being taken to extraordinary extents. While he's often mischievous, conniving and occasionally even sadistic, his heart is in the right place and he matures more as the series progresses, usually playing as the straight man to Om Nom's playful behavior whenever Om Nelle isn't there to fill the role.

=== Recurring ===
- Evan: Evan is a boy who adopts Om Nom after he was delivered to him in Season 1. Evan loves Om Nom and is happy to take care of him, treating him like his own child.
- Evil Spider: Evil Spider is Om Nom's nemesis from Season 4 to 19 and later he and Nibble Nom's friend starting in Season 27. In the Super-Noms era, Evil Spider served as the main antagonist for Om Nom and Om Nelle, usually creating new threats for them as well as new inventions. Later in the Fantasy Quest era, he and Om Nom put their differences aside and became best friends.

Nomville residents:

- Professor Cheddar: Professor Cheddar is a mouse scientist and Om Nom and Om Nelle's friend. Introduced in the Super-Noms era, Professor Cheddar resides in a lab where he makes new inventions. Most of the time, Om Nom tests out some of his inventions which lead to chaos that he has to fix.
- Mr. Boar: Mr. Boar is Mrs. Sheep's love interest in Season 11, and husband starting in Season 12. Mr. Boar works at a police station in Nomville and Om Nom and Om Nelle sometimes help him catch a felon in the Super-Noms era. In Season 11, Mr. Boar gets a baby daughter named Piggy.
- Mrs. Sheep: Mrs. Sheep is Mr. Boar's love interest in Season 11, and wife starting in Season 12. Mrs. Sheep is usually one of the victims when a villain attacks Nomville in the Super-Noms era. In Season 10, Mrs. Sheep raised her own baby sheep daughter.
- Mole: Mole is a citizen in Nomville and Om Nom and Om Nelle's friend. Mole is usually one of the victims when a villain attacks Nomville in the Super-Noms era. In Season 19, it is shown that Mole has no problem eating spicy peppers, not even the Volcano Pepper.
- Mrs. Doggins: Mrs. Doggins is an elderly Labrador Retriever and citizen in Nomville. Mrs. Doggins has a pet kitten who usually runs away from her. Mrs. Doggins usually berates Om Nom in the Super-Noms era by hitting him in the head with her umbrella cane.
- Bull: Bull is a citizen in Nomville and Om Nom's somewhat rival, known for a somewhat snooty and obnoxious personality. Bull and Om Nom are usually challenging each other to competitions. Bull gets easily annoyed by Om Nom and sometimes threatens to hurt him.

Nomcity residents:

- Giant: Giant is a mountain-like citizen in Nomcity, and one of several neighbors the Noms meet in the New Neighbors arc. Like Om Nom, he is portrayed with a childlike and dim-witted personality, although also with a kind heart.
- Handsome Nom: Handsome Nom is a citizen in Nomcity, and another neighbor met in the New Neighbors era of the series. He is known for showing off a large ego, even narcissism, always wanting his hair a certain way and insisting that everything that he's given must look like an effigy of himself.
- Groom: Groom is a dark red-colored citizen of Nomcity. He shows off a moody personality, but shows off some impressive talent and strength and becomes fast friends with Om Nom.

== Episodes ==
=== Series 1: Toonbox Era (2011–14) ===
No.	Title	Original release date
Season 1: Om Nom Stories (2011–12)
0	"Pilot: Om Nom & Cat"	December 9, 2011
1	"Strange Delivery"	October 24, 2012
2	"Bath Time"	November 8, 2012
3	"Favourite Food"	November 15, 2012
4	"Candy Prescription"	November 22, 2012
5	"Halloween Special (1)"	October 31, 2012
Note: This is the first of two episodes that share the same title of "Halloween Special".
6	"Magic Tricks"	November 29, 2012
7	"Arts and Crafts"	December 6, 2012
8	"Candy Can"	December 13, 2012
9	"Christmas Special (1)"	December 20, 2012
Note: This is the first of two episodes that share the same title of "Christmas Special".
10	"Robo Friend"	December 27, 2012
Season 2: Time Travel (2013)
11	"Time Travel"	April 17, 2013
12	"The Middle Ages"	April 17, 2013
13	"The Renaissance"	May 4, 2013
14	"Pirate Ship"	May 18, 2013
15	"Ancient Egypt"	June 1, 2013
16	"Ancient Greece"	June 15, 2013
17	"The Stone Age"	June 29, 2013
18	"Disco Era"	August 8, 2013
19	"Wild West"	December 11, 2013
20	"Home Sweet Home"	December 11, 2013
Season 3: Unexpected Adventure (2013–14)
21	"Unexpected Adventure"	December 13, 2013
22	"Forest"	December 19, 2013
23	"Sandy Dam"	December 24, 2013
24	"Junkyard"	January 5, 2014
25	"City Park"	January 25, 2014
26	"Underground"	February 8, 2014
27	"Fruit Market"	June 19, 2014
28	"Bakery"	December 8, 2014

=== Series 2: Rocket Fox Era (2016–17) ===
No.	Title	Original release date
Season 4: Magic (2016)
29	"Mysterious House"	March 15, 2016
30	"Mad Tea Party"	April 1, 2016
31	"The Magic Lamp"	April 16, 2016
32	"A Tangled Story"	April 30, 2016
33	"Ice Cave"	May 14, 2016
34	"Puppeteer"	May 28, 2016
35	"The Chest"	June 11, 2016
36	"The Beanstalk"	June 27, 2016
37	"Little Red Hungry Hood"	July 11, 2016
38	"Magic Hat"	July 22, 2016
Season 5: Around the World (2016)
39	"Football"	August 19, 2016
40	"Master Nom"	September 2, 2016
41	"Cycle Race"	September 16, 2016
42	"Sweet Duel"	September 30, 2016
43	"Sweet Recipe"	October 14, 2016
44	"Halloween Special (2)"	October 28, 2016
Note: This is the second and last of two episodes that share the same title ("Halloween Special"), the first being episode 5 of season 1.
45	"Woods Chase"	November 11, 2016
46	"The Sunken Ship"	November 25, 2016
47	"At the Fair"	December 9, 2016
48	"Christmas Special (2)"	December 20, 2016
Note: This is the second and last of two episodes that share the same title ("Christmas Special"), the first being episode 9 of season 1.
49	"Winter Park"	December 30, 2016
Season 6: Video Blog (2017)
50	"Unpacking"	January 27, 2017
51	"Scrapbooking (St. Valentine's Special)"	February 10, 2017
52	"Workout"	February 24, 2017
53	"Unexpected 360° Guest"	March 24, 2017
54	"Easter"	April 7, 2017
55	"Experiments"	April 21, 2017
56	"Pranks"	May 5, 2017
57	"Skateboarding"	May 19, 2017
58	"Makeup Tutorial"	June 2, 2017
59	"Shopping"	June 16, 2017
60	"Cooking Time"	June 30, 2017
Season 7: Dream Job (2017)
61	"Astronaut"	August 18, 2017
62	"Magician"	September 1, 2017
63	"Mailman"	September 15, 2017
64	"Waiter"	September 29, 2017
65	"Farmer"	October 13, 2017
66	"Mad Scientist"	October 27, 2017
67	"Detective"	November 10, 2017
68	"Engineer"	November 24, 2017
69	"Actor"	December 8, 2017
70	"Santa (Christmas Special)"	December 22, 2017

=== Series 3: Super-Noms (2018–19) ===
No.	Title	Original release date
Season 8 (2018)
71	"Super-Noms"	January 19, 2018
72	"Omzilla"	February 2, 2018
73	"St. Valentine's Day"	February 14, 2018
74	"Ferret Robber"	March 2, 2018
75	"UFO"	March 16, 2018
76	"Easter Bunny"	March 23, 2018
77	"Trash Monster"	April 13, 2018
78	"Lonely Warrior"	April 27, 2018
79	"On the Edge"	May 11, 2018
80	"Evil Snowman"	May 25, 2018
Season 9 (2018)
81	"The Great Escape"	June 22, 2018
82	"Friends to the Rescue"	July 6, 2018
83	"Electro Ferret"	July 20, 2018
84	"Cupid's Arrows"	August 2, 2018
85	"Shrunken Noms"	August 31, 2018
86	"Piranha Man"	September 14, 2018
87	"Cactus Attack"	September 28, 2018
88	"Cinema Wars"	October 5, 2018
89	"Double Trouble"	October 12, 2018
90	"Ghost Terror (Halloween)"	October 19, 2018
Season 10 (2018–19)
91	"Emergency Help"	November 2, 2018
92	"Burnman"	November 9, 2018
93	"Hocus Pocus"	November 16, 2018
94	"Bigfoot"	November 23, 2018
95	"Mechanic Rodeo"	November 30, 2018
96	"Digital Adventures"	December 7, 2018
97	"Saving Christmas"	December 14, 2018
98	"Grandma's Power"	December 21, 2018
99	"Bookworm"	December 28, 2018
100	"Snow Castles"	January 4, 2019
Season 11 (2019)
101	"Grocery Store Brawl"	January 18, 2019
102	"Festive Firework"	January 25, 2019
103	"Cupid's Bow"	February 8, 2019
104	"Robo Butler"	February 15, 2019
105	"Wormy Apple"	February 22, 2019
106	"Holi Monkey"	March 1, 2019
107	"Brazilian Carnival"	March 8, 2019
108	"Electric Horror"	March 15, 2019
109	"Interrupted Ceremony (Pt 1)"	March 22, 2019
110	"Interrupted Ceremony (Pt 2)"	March 29, 2019
Season 12 (2019)
111	"Easter Stir"	April 12, 2019
112	"Neighbours' War"	April 19, 2019
113	"Rugrats on the Run"	April 26, 2019
114	"Ice-cream Rain"	May 3, 2019
115	"Risk Race"	May 10, 2019
116	"Laserboy"	May 17, 2019
117	"Sneaky Seal"	May 24, 2019
118	"Save Kitten!"	May 31, 2019
119	"Evil Spray Paint"	June 7, 2019
120	"T-u-r-t-l-e"	June 14, 2019
Season 13 (2019)
121	"Parrot Prank"	August 16, 2019
122	"Giant Professor"	August 23, 2019
123	"The Lost Ball"	August 30, 2019
124	"Heroes Unite"	September 6, 2019
125	"Time Controller"	September 13, 2019
126	"Baby Om Nelle"	September 20, 2019
127	"Robo-Noms (Pt 1)"	September 27, 2019
128	"Robo-Noms (Pt 2)"	October 4, 2019
129	"Portals Attack"	October 11, 2019
130	"Horror Story"	October 18, 2019
Season 14 (2019)
131	"Piñata Party"	October 25, 2019
132	"Achoo!"	November 1, 2019
133	"Tomb Noms"	November 8, 2019
134	"Superclothes"	November 15, 2019
135	"Nightmare Cruise"	November 22, 2019
136	"Happy Birthday!"	November 29, 2019
137	"Poisonous Clouds"	December 6, 2019
138	"Oh Christmas Tree"	December 13, 2019
139	"Prehistoric Nom"	December 20, 2019
140	"Magic Mic"	December 27, 2019

=== Series 4: Nibble-Nom (2020) ===
No.	Title	Original release date
Season 15 (2020)
141	"Nibble-Nom (Bath Time & Pirates)"	February 21, 2020
142	"Sand Castle"	March 6, 2020
143	"Tea Party"	March 13, 2020
144	"Bedtime Play"	March 20, 2020
145	"Cake Thieves"	March 27, 2020
146	"Magic Fails"	April 3, 2020
147	"Sandbox Builders"	April 10, 2020
148	"Playground Fun"	April 17, 2020
149	"Vacuuming the City"	April 24, 2020
150	"The Wild West"	May 1, 2020
Season 16 (2020)
151	"Draw the World"	May 15, 2020
152	"Lunch Space Wars"	May 22, 2020
153	"Stinkysaurus Nom"	May 29, 2020
154	"Turbo Nom"	June 5, 2020
155	"An Apple a Day"	June 12, 2020
156	"Detective Nom"	June 19, 2020
157	"Fashion Show"	June 26, 2020
158	"Watermelon Farm"	July 3, 2020
159	"Nomerella"	July 10, 2020
160	"Platformer"	July 17, 2020
Season 17 (2020)
161	"Eruption Disruption"	September 4, 2020
162	"Pearl Treasure"	September 18, 2020
163	"Tree House"	October 2, 2020
164	"Stellar Sorting"	October 30, 2020
165	"Tiny Ghost"	October 16, 2020
166	"Goldilocks Nom"	November 13, 2020
167	"Snow Fight"	November 27, 2020
168	"Saved Christmas"	December 4, 2020
169	"Scout Noms"	December 18, 2020
170	"Nom Olympics"	December 25, 2020

=== Series 5: Om Nom Cafe (2021) ===
No.	Title	Original release date
Season 18 (2021)
171	"A Sweet Start"	January 29, 2021
172	"Cake for Two"	February 12, 2021
173	"Cheese Power"	February 26, 2021
174	"Squeaky Clean"	March 12, 2021
175	"Easter Eggs"	March 26, 2021
176	"Competitor"	June 25, 2021
177	"Sushi"	April 23, 2021
178	"Wash Up!"	May 7, 2021
179	"Wonder Mixer"	May 21, 2021
180	"Mega Meal"	June 4, 2021
Season 19 (2021)
181	"Back to School"	August 20, 2021
182	"Chef Level"	September 3, 2021
183	"Chef Hat"	September 10, 2021
184	"Tiny Sabotage"	September 17, 2021
185	"Happy Day"	September 24, 2021
186	"Nuts for Coco"	October 1, 2021
187	"Hot Competition"	October 8, 2021
188	"Sweet Nom!"	October 15, 2021
189	"Spooky Delivery"	October 22, 2021
190	"Oh My Cake"	October 29, 2021

=== Series 6: New Neighbors (2021–23) ===
No.	Title	Original release date
Season 20 (2021–22)
191	"No Tears"	November 12, 2021
192	"Pre-Loved Gift"	November 19, 2021
193	"Nom Pranks"	November 26, 2021
194	"Sporty Nom"	December 3, 2021
195	"Xmas Neighbor"	December 10, 2021
196	"Monster Gaming"	December 17, 2021
197	"Talent Show"	December 24, 2021
198	"Arts & Crafts"	December 31, 2021
199	"Snowy Fun"	January 7, 2022
200	"Appearance Matters"	January 14, 2022
Season 21 (2022)
201	"Heart-Shaped"	February 11, 2022
202	"Om Nom Game"	February 18, 2022
203	"Nom-bit Games"	February 25, 2022
204	"Common Playground"	March 11, 2022
205	"Wake Up"	March 18, 2022
206	"PhotoNom"	March 25, 2022
207	"Sleepover"	April 1, 2022
208	"Egg-sellent!"	April 8, 2022
209	"Game On"	April 15, 2022
210	"Nomtastic Weather"	April 22, 2022
Season 22 (2022)
211	"Sports for All"	May 20, 2022
212	"Dress Up"	June 3, 2022
213	"Learn Like Nom"	August 19, 2022
214	"Sunny Day"	September 2, 2022
215	"Lunch Time"	September 9, 2022
216	"TV Friends"	September 16, 2022
217	"Birthday Monster"	September 23, 2022
218	"Paper Games"	September 30, 2022
219	"Board Gamer"	October 12, 2022
22	"Beach Fun"	October 14, 2022
Season 23 (2022)
221	"Spooky Time"	October 21, 2022
222	"SmartNom"	October 28, 2022
223	"Nom on Wheels"	November 4, 2022
224	"Hot Days"	November 11, 2022
225	"Weather Tricks"	November 19, 2022
226	"Good Manners"	November 26, 2022
227	"Clean Up!"	December 2, 2022
228	"Nommy Holidays"	December 9, 2022
229	"Picnic"	December 16, 2022
230	"Let It Snow!"	December 23, 2022
Season 24 (2023)
231	"Rubik's Cuber"	March 3, 2023
232	"Soccer Pro"	March 10, 2023
233	"Fair Fun"	March 31, 2023
234	"Masked Heroes"	April 14, 2023
235	"App Master"	April 28, 2023
236	"Winner"	May 12, 2023
237	"Inner Artist"	May 26, 2023
238	"Game or Reality?"	June 16, 2023
239	"Whatever the Weather"	July 14, 2023
240	"Giggles at the Grocery"	August 11, 2023
Season 25 (2023)
241	"No Problem!"	March 23, 2023
242	"Taste Buddies"	April 7, 2023
243	"To the Extreme"	April 21, 2023
244	"Om Nom's Treat"	May 5, 2023
245	"Overcoming Fears"	May 19, 2023
246	"Solution Seeker"	June 2, 2023
247	"Hungry Chase"	June 30, 2023
248	"The Great Party Quest"	July 28, 2023
249	"Busy Day"	August 25, 2023
250	"Postal Puzzles"	September 15, 2023
Season 26 (2023)
251	"Grown-Up Imposter"	August 30, 2023
252	"Birthday Sneaks"	September 29, 2023
253	"Pumpkin Prowl: Candy's Curse"	October 27, 2023
254	"A Silence Quest"	November 3, 2023
255	"Giga-Troubles"	November 10, 2023
256	"Unruly Hair Adventure"	November 24, 2023
257	"Pixelated Showdown"	December 1, 2023
258	"Cat-astrophic Combo"	December 8, 2023
259	"Christmas Freeze"	December 15, 2023
260	"Snow Nom"	December 22, 2023

=== Series 7: Fantasy Quest (2024) ===
No.	Title	Original release date
Season 27 (2024)
261	"Fantasy Quest"	February 23, 2024
262	"Stone Age Noms"	March 8, 2024
263	"Nomosaurus"	March 22, 2024
264	"Royal Riddle"	April 5, 2024
265	"Black Hole"	April 19, 2024
266	"Siren Clash"	May 3, 2024
267	"Ninja Apples"	May 17, 2024
268	"A Chase at the Museum"	May 31, 2024
269	"Sneaky Seagull"	June 14, 2024
270	"Alien Ship"	June 28, 2024
Special	"Green Wind Power"	October 4, 2024

=== Series 8: Nomville (2025–2026) ===
No.	Title	Original release date
Season 28 (2025–2026)
271	"The Great Gift Chase"	December 12, 2025
272	"Carnival"	February 12, 2026
273	"Nom Bot"	February 20, 2026
274	"Fence Frenzy"	March 6, 2026
275	"The Parent Showdown"	March 20, 2026
276	"Meltdown in Nomville"	April 3, 2026
277	"Nom Werewolf"	April 17, 2026
278	"Watermelon Trouble"	May 1, 2026
279	"Clean Up Chaos"	May 22, 2026
280	"Beach Day"	June 5, 2026
Season 29 (2026)
281	"Kitty at Om Nom's Place"	June 19, 2026
282	"The Super Wild Plant"	July 17, 2026
283	"Fitness Face Off"	August 14, 2026
284	"No Pigeons Invited"	September 11, 2026
285	"The Great Helper"	September 25, 2026
286	"A Picnic for Two"	October 9, 2026
287	"Supermarket Menace"	October 23, 2026
288	"Irresistible Cake"	November 13, 2026
