= Charisma (disambiguation) =

Charisma is either compelling attractiveness or charm that can inspire devotion in others, or a divinely conferred power or talent.

Charisma or Charismatic may also refer to:

== Religion ==
- Charisma (magazine), a magazine for charismatic Christians
- Charisma Christian Church, a French evangelical megachurch
- Charismatic Christianity, an umbrella term for Pentecostals and the Charismatic movement
  - Charismatic movement, a subset of the Christian belief system

== Arts and entertainment ==
- Charisma (film), a 1999 film directed by Kiyoshi Kurosawa
- Charisma, a 2002 novel written by Steven Barnes
- Charisma Records, a record label for progressive rock bands
- Charisma (album), a 1966 jazz album by Lee Morgan
- "Charisma", a song from the Kiss album Dynasty
- Charisma, an attribute commonly used in role-playing games

== People ==
- Charisma Amoe-Tarrant (born 1999), Nauruan-Australian weightlifter
- Charisma Carpenter (born 1970), American actress
- Charisma Osborne (born 2001), American basketball player
- Charisma Taylor (born 1999), Bahamian hurdler and jumper

== Plants and animals ==
- Charisma (horse), a horse that won several gold medals in the sport of eventing
- Charismatic (horse), 1999 Kentucky Derby and Preakness Stakes winner
- Charisma (gastropod), a genus of sea snail in the family Trochidae
- Charisma (elm hybrid)

== Software ==
- Micrografx Charisma, a charting application

== See also ==
- Charismatic authority, a sociology term coined by Max Weber
- Charism, in general denotes any good gift that flows from God's love to man
- Charizma (1973–1993), hip-hop artist
- Karisma Kapoor (born 1974), Indian actress
- Karishma (disambiguation), a feminine name of Sanskrit origin
