= Cut the Rope (video game) =

- App icon
- Developer: ZeptoLab
- Publisher: Chillingo
- Series: Cut the Rope
- Platforms: iOS; Android; Windows Phone; Series 60; Blackberry 10; Browser; Nintendo 3DS; Nintendo DSi
- Release: October 4, 2010: iOS; October 4, 2010; Android; June 30, 2011; DSi; September 22, 2011; Browser; January 2012; 3DS; August 22, 2013
- Genre: Puzzle
- Mode: Single-player

Cut the Rope is a 2010 puzzle video game developed by ZeptoLab and published by Chillingo for iOS, Android, Windows Phone, Series 60 (^3 and above), Blackberry 10, web browsers, Nintendo DSi, and Nintendo 3DS. Players must guide a piece of candy to Om Nom, a green monster character, using the touchscreen. The game was succeeded by Cut the Rope: Experiments in 2011 while a direct sequel, Cut the Rope 2, was released in 2013.

== Gameplay ==
A level of Cut the Rope. The candy floats in a bubble, which can be popped with a touch or blown to the right with the blue air cushion. The red button reverses the direction of gravity, making the candy go down in the bubble and up when it is not.

On each stage, a candy is hung by one or several ropes, which the player can cut. The goal of each stage is to get the candy to a green monster named Om Nom by cutting the ropes in a particular order while utilizing the game's physics to get the candy to Om Nom. As the game progresses, new elements are added to the puzzles; examples including bubbles that can float the candy offscreen and spiders that can steal the candy. Such elements require the player to utilize them in such a fashion that the candy can reach Om Nom.

There are several levels in the game, each divided into 25 stages. Each stage has three stars that can be collected by having the candy touch them. Though the stages can be completed without collecting all three stars, the stars are necessary for unlocking later levels.

== Development ==
Creative director Semyon Voinov and director of development Denis Morozov of ZeptoLab are the creators of Cut the Rope. The inspiration for Cut the Rope was during the development of their debut game, Parachute Ninja. Parachute Ninja was originally going to use a rope mechanic that the ninja would use to swing. ZeptoLab became unsatisfied with the controls of the rope and swapped it with a parachute mechanic. ZeptoLab eventually fine-tuned the rope physics to use in their next project, which would become Cut the Rope. The game started as a basic concept of delivering an object from point A to point B. When they had the idea of delivering candy to a little green monster, they found the idea both absurd and adorable, and they developed the game with this idea in mind. Much of Om Nom's features were designed after a two-year-old baby to make him cute, and ZeptoLab worked on his animations and sounds to give him charm.

== Release ==
ZeptoLab chose Chillingo as the publisher, different from the publisher of Parachute Ninja, Freeverse. ZeptoLab chose Chillingo over Freeverse because they felt Chillingo's player base would be a "good fit" for Cut the Rope's target audience. Cut the Rope premiered on October 4, 2010, for iOS. This was followed by a free version with fewer levels for each device, called Cut the Rope Free and Cut the Rope HD Free respectively.

The Android version was released in June 2011. The DSiWare version was released September 22, 2011, for Europe and November for North America on Nintendo DS (DSi), and August 22, 2013, for Nintendo 3DS users.

In January 2012, a limited version of the game was published as a browser game for HTML5 browsers. The Series 60 version of the game was released in March 2012 in Nokia's Ovi Store, initially only being available on ^3 and Anna, but it was then later available on Belle. The BlackBerry version of Cut the Rope was released to BlackBerry World following the announcement of BlackBerry 10 in January 2013.

== Reception ==
Reception

Aggregate score
Aggregator	Score
Metacritic	93/100

Review scores
Publication	Score
Eurogamer	9/10
GameSpot	8/10
IGN	9/10

Awards
Publication	Award
Apple Inc.	Apple Design Award 2011
BAFTA	British Academy Video Games Awards 2011
Pocket Gamer	Pocket Gamer Readers' Choice Award 2012
Webby Award	Webby Awards People's Voice 2013
Game Developers Conference	Game Developers Choice Awards 2010

Cut the Rope was received well by critics. The aggregator website Metacritic has a score of 93 out of 100 based on 14 reviews, a rating of "universal acclaim". IGN has praised the game for having "the addictive qualities of Angry Birds – great puzzles, near-perfect use of touch controls, and cute personality". GameSpot has described it as "fresh, challenging, gorgeous, and highly entertaining". Jon Mundy of Pocket Gamer was equally positive, calling it "bright, imaginative, and supremely polished".

At the 11th Annual Game Developers Choice Awards (2010), Cut the Rope won in the "Best Handheld Game" category, beating such prominent contesters as Metal Gear Solid: Peace Walker and God of War: Ghost of Sparta, which debuted on PSP that year. At WWDC 2011, Cut the Rope won an Apple Design Award for the iOS platform. In March 2011, it won the 7th British Academy Video Games Awards in the "Handheld" category and a BaFTA Award, the first iOS game to do so.

Nine days after its initial release, the game had been purchased one million times and rose to the top of the App Store's charts. According to Chillingo, this made it the fastest-selling iOS game to reach that number of sales.
