= Triple Treat =

Triple Treat may refer to:

- Cut the Rope: Triple Treat, a 2014 video game
- Triple Treat, a flavor of Bubble Tape
- Triple Treat, an album trilogy by Herb Ellis, Monty Alexander, and Ray Brown:
  - Triple Treat, 1982
  - Triple Treat II, 1988
  - Triple Treat III, 1989
