= Humans of Bombay =

Indian photoblog by Karishma Mehta

- Website type: Photoblog
- Available in: English
- Owner: Karishma Mehta
- Employees: 5
- Website: https://www.humansofbombay.in/
- Commercial: Private limited company
- Launched: 2014; 12 years ago
- Current status: Online

Humans of Bombay (HoB) is an Indian website founded in 2014 by Karishma Mehta to document inspirational stories of people in Mumbai (previously known as Bombay).

== Development ==
Inspired by the Humans of New York (HoNY) website, Karishma Mehta started Humans of Bombay in January 2014, by traveling around Mumbai and asking people questions about their lives and for permission to take and upload their photographs and their answers to her website. By April 2014, the Facebook page had more than 135 posts and almost 40,000 followers. By November 2015, the page had reached 4 lakh followers. According to Poorva Joshi at the Hindustan Times, Humans of Bombay "is different from HONY, where Stanton, at times, shares only a quirky one-liner from his subject" and Mehta is "also more of a documentarian of personal stories than a photographer."

By 2015, Mehta began using the page to conduct fundraising campaigns, including for Kranti, an organization that supports the daughters of sex workers, and collected Rs. 6.5 lakhs for Kranti in one day. In 2015, Humans of Bombay featured the story and picture of a girl speaking out against child marriage, that within two days gained over 60,000 likes on Facebook, and created an opportunity for Humans of Bombay to promote Aangan, the child protection organization supporting the girl. A crowdfunding campaign for a child with blood cancer raised Rs 10.31 lakh within days.

By 2016, Mehta moved the blog to humansofbombay.in, and self-published the book Humans of Bombay. By then, the blog had covered a wide range of subjects, from everyday interactions to topics such as depression, alcoholism, domestic violence, child sexual abuse, Sapna Bhavnani discussing her gang-rape, and people sharing their own stories and support for others. Fundraising campaigns continued on the website, including in 2017, raising Rs 11 lakh within four days on behalf of the daughter of a sex worker to support her education at New York University.

By 2018, Humans of Bombay had grown to six permanent employees, expanded beyond Mumbai, and established an Instagram page with what Aishwarya Upadhye of The Hindu described as "Stories that make you grin from ear to ear, stories that would give you pangs of guilt, the ones that would make you well up, those that cement your belief in hope and survival," and Sadaf Shaikh of Verve described as "all kinds of stories – some that plaster a big grin on your face, others that elicit a quick prayer for having a privileged life."

== Details ==
The website has featured thousands of people, including Ratan Tata, Narendra Modi, Nawazuddin Siddiqui, Rajkummar Rao, Kareena Kapoor Khan, Boman Irani, Anupam Kher, Kartik Aaryan, Sunil Chhetri, Milind Soman, Sapna Bhavnani, Kajol and Ajay Devgan, and Devika Rotawan. Topics include acid attacks, sex workers, domestic violence and inter-caste love stories. Humans of Bombay published a first-hand account of a Jamia student talking about the Citizenship Amendment Bill (CAA) and the Jamia attack. In 2021, a post by actress Sanjana Sanghi was removed after protests on social media over the content of her post featuring domestic workers.

== Copyright infringement lawsuit ==
In September 2023, Humans of Bombay began a copyright infringement case, seeking an injunction against the People of India website, and a summons was issued by the Delhi High Court in Humans of Bombay Stories Pvt Ltd v. POI Social Media Pvt Ltd in which the court stated, "Prima facie there is substantial imitation and in fact, in some cases, the photographs/images are identical or imitative."

In October 2023, after an agreement between the parties, the Delhi High Court ruled each website will "refrain" from using the copyrighted work of the other website. Monetary damages were not awarded to either party, and the court said if an image is sent to both websites, the image cannot be copyrighted by either website. With regard to storytelling platforms generally, the court also ruled, "Ideas cannot be copyrighted, the way they are expressed can be subject to law."

After the lawsuit was filed, Mehta was targeted by widespread cybertrolling. Brandon Stanton, the founder of Humans of New York, was among critics on social media of how Humans of Bombay conducts its business, and Humans of Bombay responded to Stanton on social media. After the Delhi High Court ruling, Mehta published a statement on Instagram about the legal case, including, "While we did not expect to be vilified to this extent, it will not deter us from continuing to tell important stories that change the narrative, and sometimes, even change lives."

== Publications ==
- Mehta, Karishma (2017). Humans of Bombay. ISBN 9788179918951.

== See also ==
- Everyday Mumbai
