= Everyday Africa =

African photoblog

- Website type: Photoblog
- Owners: Peter DiCampo, Austin Merrill
- Commercial: No
- Launched: March 2012

Everyday Africa is a photoblog and book of collective of 30 photographers capturing daily life in Africa.

Started in March 2012 by photographer Peter DiCampo and writer Austin Merrill, Everyday Africa has developed a large following through social media. The blog had over 382,000 followers on Instagram and 71,000 followers on Facebook as of July 2018. Hundreds of "Everyday" blogs have since been developed by people in different countries around the world influenced by Everyday Africa.

== Blog ==
=== Africa ===
Peter Dicampo and Austin Merrill started Everyday Africa initially on Tumblr when they both were on assignment for Peace Corps in Ivory Coast. What began as an Instagram account in 2012, is now a global movement bringing a greater awareness of what ordinary life looks like in Africa, a continent of 54 diverse countries.

=== Global movement ===
Getting Influenced from Everyday Africa, many other "Everyday", projects were started from Asia, Middle East, Iran, Australia. A total of more than 100 everyday projects are now live on Instagram. In 2014, Instagram noticed the growth of everyday accounts and invited the curators to exhibit at Photoville in New York City. After meeting up in person at the exhibition, they decided to start a collective The Everyday Projects, which became a non-profit.

== Book ==
Everyday Africa book based on photoblog, also titled Everyday Africa, was launched on May 22, 2017. Published by Kehrer Verlag, the book is a compilation of photographs from Everyday Africa Instagram account that aims to more accurately show day-to-day life throughout Africa.

== Education ==
Everyday Africa educators work with students to dissect both traditional media representations of Africa and the students’ own communities. Students then take their own photos with smartphones or other simple cameras, telling their neighborhood stories while learning and eventually showcasing valuable visual and cultural literacy skills.

== Impact ==
The account inspired similar account for other regions, such as Asia, Egypt, the Middle East.

== See also ==
- Everyday Mumbai
