= Devika Rotawan =

Indian terrorist-attack survivor

- देविका रोतावन
- Born: Mumbai, Maharashtra
- Education: Chetana College

Devika Rotawan is a survivor of the 2008 Mumbai attacks (also referred to as 26/11) and a key witness who identified Ajmal Kasab during trial as a perpetrator of the attack. She was nine years old when she was shot in the leg during the attack in the Chhatrapati Shivaji Terminus, Mumbai.

== Early life and education ==
Devika Rotawan was born to Sarika and Natwarlal Rotawan and has two brothers. Her mother died in 2006. Her father sold dried fruit before the 2008 Mumbai attacks.

== 2008 Mumbai attacks ==
Rotawan was nine years old when she was injured in the 2008 Mumbai attacks. On 26 November 2008, she was waiting for a train with her father and brother when the attack started, and she was shot in her leg. After the attack, she had six surgeries and spent 45 days in the hospital. She lost the use of her right leg during her treatment and recuperation.

She was the youngest witness in the trial against Ajmal Kasab. She was recuperating from her injuries while also preparing for the trial in meetings with lawyers and depositions. On 10 June 2009, during her trial testimony, she identified Kasab as an attacker in the train station, and her father also testified.

== Post-attack life ==
After the attacks, her family received compensation from the government and financial support from politicians and organizations, and spent much of the money on the medical care for her brother Jayesh. She has said additional compensation later went to her own medical treatment. She and her family moved to Rajasthan, where her father is from and has family, then returned to Mumbai for the trial, and moved to a Bandra slum in 2009.

When she attempted to attend school after the 2008 Mumbai attacks, she was teased and shunned by her classmates. She began school at age 11, but had at first encountered resistance to her enrollment due to security concerns. She enrolled to IES New English High School, Bandra east, completed HSC from Siddharth College, Fort. She completed her graduation in Arts from Chetana College in 2023.

She has said she wants to become an IPS officer. In 2019, she shared her story with the website Humans of Bombay. In 2020, she said she still had not received the home she had been promised by the government, and Maharashtra MLA Zeeshan Siddique advocated to Chief Minister Uddhav Thackeray for the home to be provided to her. In October 2020, after she filed a petition in court seeking the home from the government and asserted her family was unable to pay rent on their chawl in Bandra, the Bombay High Court ordered Chief Secretary Sanjay Kumar to consider it. On 14 March 2024, the Bombay High Court ruled that Rotawan must be given ownership of the house within six months.

== Devika Rotawan vs State of Maharashtra ==
In 2020, as a victim of terrorist attack, Rotawan filed a petition to request the government to allot for a house under the economically weaker section (EWS) and the high court directed the government to consider her plea and pass appropriate orders. In 2022, Rotawan once again moved the high court noting that her representation was rejected by the government. The government had then said that a compensation amount of Rs 13.26 lakh was handed to Rotawan on compassionate grounds. The high court had then directed the state government to reconsider her representation for allotment of residential premises.

Rotawan again approached the high court with the help of her lawyer and in March 2024, the high court observed it as a genuine case of one of the youngest survivors and eye-witnesses of the 26/11 terror attacks which requires to be dealt with more sensitivity and being mindful of her human rights, the Bombay High Court on Wednesday told the State Housing Minister to consider a request made by Devika Rotawan for a house under the economically weaker section (EWS) quota.

The Bombay High Court has rebuked the Maharashtra government for its handling of a housing request by Devika Rotawan, a victim of the 2008 Mumbai terror attacks. The court directed the housing department to review Rotawan's request for a house under the economically weaker section (EWS) scheme with greater sensitivity, considering her exceptional circumstances and basic human rights.

The bench of Justices GS Kulkarni and Firdosh Pooniwalla emphasised a comprehensive review of all allotments, stating, "We will appoint a high power committee of independent persons. We are very serious about this issue. Once we see a violation of human rights, and mechanically closing files, we will not appreciate this." In its order, the bench stressed that cases like Rotawan's, involving victims of terrorist attacks, demand more human sensitivity and discretion, urging the housing minister to take an appropriate decision. On 14 March 2024, they ruled that Rotawan must be given ownership of the house within six months.

== Honours, awards and recognition ==
In 2009, she was honoured with an award from a NGO. She also received the Nagrik Ratan award in Rajasthan from Banwari Lal Joshi. In 2014, she was awarded a Women Achievers Award, Rajasthan Gaurav Award, Shree Ganganagar Rajasthan Award from Tapovan trust, and the Baramati Award from Ajit Pawar and Sharad Pawar.

In October 2022, United Nations Secretary-General António Guterres met with Rotawan. Speaking at the special meeting of the United Nations Security Council Counter-Terrorism Committee, Rotawan said she wanted to become a police officer so that she can play a role in combating terror. She also demanded a strong law to deal with the terror.
