= Wen Ling =

Chinese photographer and painter

Wen Ling, (Chinese: 温凌, born in 1976 in Beijing, China) is a Chinese contemporary artist currently living in Beijing.

Wen Ling graduated from printmaking at the Central Academy of Fine Arts in China. Wen Ling predominately uses photography, drawings and painting in his work. He has published multiple comics and photography books, while also showing and selling individual works in both commercial and public gallery spaces.

He is noted for creating the first photoblog in China.

== Background ==
Wen Ling was born in Beijing, China in 1976.

After graduating from the printmaking department at CAFA Wen Ling went on to work as a photographer at the Jinhua Daily.

In 2001, Wen Ling created the first photoblog in China. His blog, ziboy.com was a collection of snapshots from his daily life. It was noted for giving an international audience a view into the “average” life of a native Chinese.

Since his blog, Wen Ling has produced a number of works in other media and published comic books. His work has been displayed in many public shows in museums such as Ullens Centre for Contemporary Art, Beijing, and Minsheng Centre of Contemporary Art in Shanghai.

== Publications ==
- Potot Boys (2014)
- One Day in My Life (2012)
- 54boy (2011)
- Wen Ling: Paintings, Videos & Cartoons《温凌绘画、摄影和动画》(2009)
- Looking for Me《找自己》(2008)
- Next Station, Cartoon?《下一站，卡通吗？》(2005)
- Naughty Kids《坏孩子的天空》(2005)
