= Gisimba Memorial Centre =

Rwandan non-profit organization for disadvantaged children

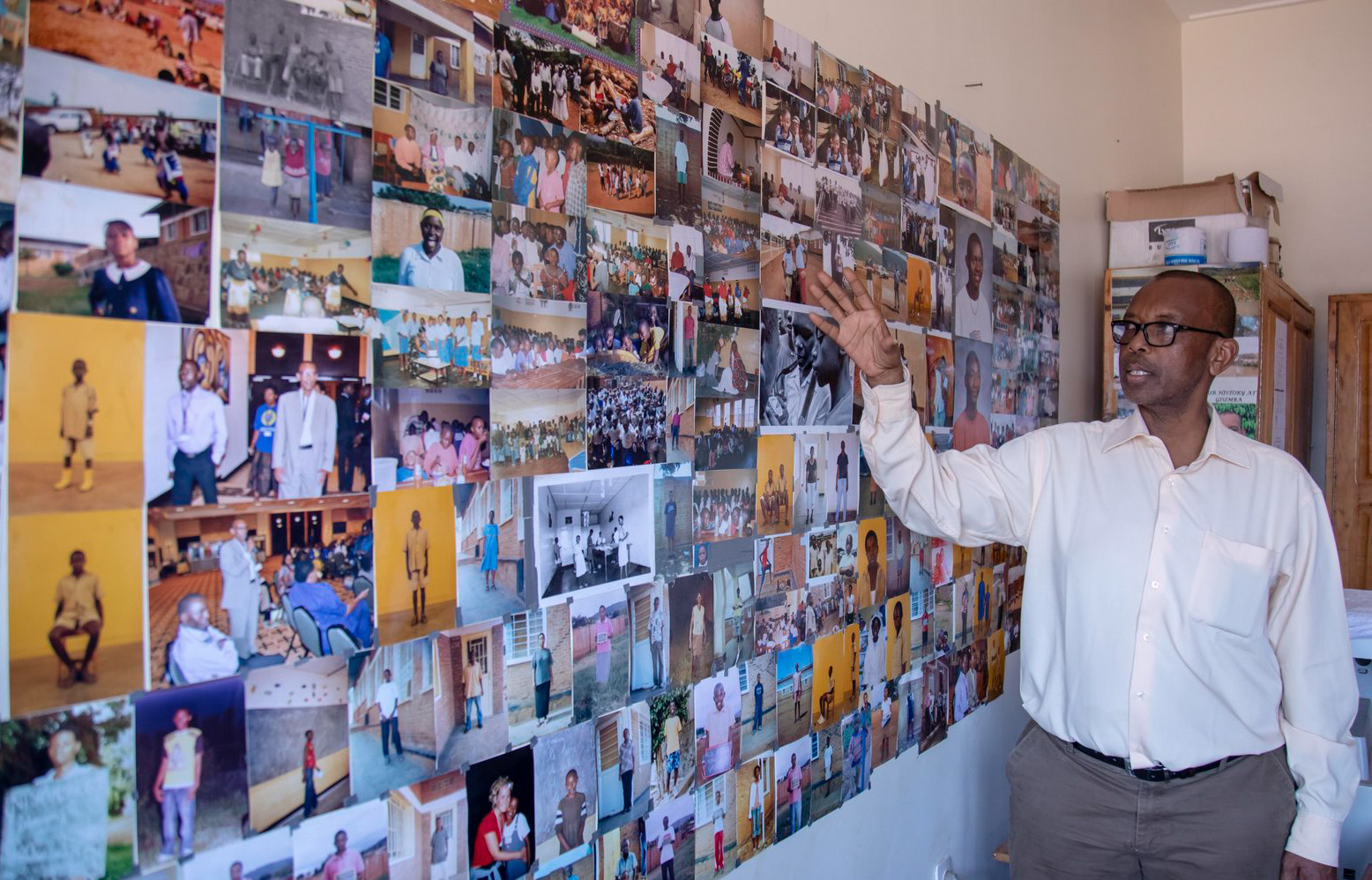
- Damas Gisimba Mutezintare, the Director of the Gisimba Memorial center
- Founder: Peter and Dancilla Gisimba
- Location: Kigali, Rwanda
- Coordinates: 1.973136°S 30.049185°E
- Director: Damas Gisimba
- Website: gisimba.org
- Formerly called: Gisimba Orphanage

Gisimba Memorial Centre is a trauma informed community center and an after-school centre for disadvantaged children in Kigali, Rwanda. Formerly, it was the oldest and best-known orphanage in Rwanda, however, in 2016 the government began closing orphanages and transferring the children under foster care and adoption to families. It was founded by Peter and Dancilla Gisimba in the 1980s. They took orphans into their home from the local community, until there were too many to house, at which point they transferred to a larger location. It was renamed the Gisimba Memorial Centre in 1990.

In the Rwandan genocide of 1994, the Damas and Jean-Francois Gisimba (the founder's sons) along with American aide worker Carl Wilkens help hide and save 400 children, and even more adults, within the orphanage from the Interahamwe, or Hutu militia. On November 21, 2017, the former orphanage officially changed its mission. In a statement to the press, the director said, "We have turned the orphanage to Gisimba after School Initiative – it is a training centre which will bring the youth together for several entertainment and education activities."

== Media ==
Brandon Stanton, the creator of Humans of New York, visited Rwanda in September 2018. Beginning on October 16, 2018, he began covering the genocide on his site through a series of interviews and photos from persons who were affected. On his site, he stated his objective: "During my week in Rwanda, I focused on the stories of people who took a moral stand during the genocide. These are members of the Hutu majority who risked their lives to shield and protect Tutsis. In Rwanda they are known as ‘The Rescuers.'" In conjunction with the series, he hosted a GoFundMe campaign to benefit the Gisimba Memorial Centre in Rwanda and the planned the yet-to-be-built Gisimba House in Uganda. He supplemented the campaign with $13,000 from HONY's Patreon fund, as well as with $1 for every donation beyond the 5,000th donation. The campaign reached its goal of $200,000 in 18 hours,
