= Karishma =

Karishma is an Indian feminine given name of Persian origin which means "miracle".

In Hindi, Punjabi and Urdu, it translates to “miracle” , “marvel” or “divine wonder”.

It also shares a striking phonetic and thematic relationship with the Greek word ‘Khárisma’ which means “divine gift” or “personal magnetism” . Ancient Greek word khárisma and Cháris which is also the etymological root of the English word “Charisma”.

Karishma and Khárisma/Charisma are generally considered cognates - words that have similar meaning and sound, even if they evolved separately in different language families (Indo-European). While they sound alike and share similar meanings, they come from entirely different linguistic roots.

Name similar to Karishma include Karisma and Charisma. While they have their own roots, they share an identical spiritual essence and often used interchangeably when choosing names today.

Related or Similar Words and Meanings :

- Chamatkar
- Karamat
- Mojza / Mu’jizah
- Ejaz / Ijaz
- Farjud

It may refer to:

== People ==
- Karisma Kapoor, Indian actress
- Karishma Karki, Nepali Olympian swimmer
- Karishma Kotak, British-Indian actress
- Karishma Manandhar, Nepali actress
- Karishma Mehta, Indian writer
- Karishma Modi, Indian model
- Karishma Naina Sharma, Indian entertainment executive
- Karishma Patel, Indian cast member, Survivor (USA)
- Karishma Randhawa, Indian actress
- Karishma Ramharack, Trinidadian cricketer for West Indies
- Karishma Sharma, Indian actress
- Karishma Tanna, Indian actress
- Karishma Vijay, English businesswoman

== Other uses ==
- Karishmaa, a 1984 Bollywood film
- Karishma – The Miracles of Destiny, a 2003-2004 Indian TV serial
- ‘’Karishma Kaa Karishma’’ , Indian television series which is a remake of 1980s American TV series ‘Small Wonder’
