= Humans of New York =

American photoblog by Brandon Stanton

- Website type: Photoblog
- Owner: Brandon Stanton
- Website: www.humansofnewyork.com
- Commercial: No
- Launched: September 4, 2010
- Current status: Online

Humans of New York (HONY) is an online storytelling project and collection of books featuring portraits and interviews collected on the streets of New York City.

Started in November 2010 by photographer Brandon Stanton, Humans of New York has developed a large following through social media. As of 2025, it has approximately 30 million followers across social media platforms. Hundreds of "Humans of" blogs have since been developed by people in different cities around the world influenced by HONY.

Stanton has collected portraits in over 40 different countries including Bangladesh, Iran, Iraq, and Pakistan. In January 2015, he interviewed U.S. president Barack Obama in the Oval Office. Also in 2015, Stanton covered the European migrant crisis in partnership with the United Nations High Commissioner for Refugees (UNHCR) to capture and share the emotional experience of refugees in Europe fleeing wars in the Middle East. In September 2016, Stanton interviewed U.S. presidential candidate Hillary Clinton.

The work has been turned into four #1 New York Times bestselling books. In October 2025, the Humans of New York archives were exhibited in a two-week art installation in Grand Central Terminal called Dear New York.

== Blog ==
=== New York City ===
Brandon Stanton started his blog in November 2010. Initially, he planned to gather 10,000 portraits of New Yorkers and plot them on a map of the city. The project soon evolved, however, when Stanton started having conversations with his subjects and including small quotes and stories alongside his photographs. With this new format, the blog began to grow rapidly. In a matter of months, HONY became so popular that when Stanton accidentally updated his Facebook status with just the letter "Q", his post garnered 73 likes within a minute. As of May 2024, Humans of New York had more than 17 million likes on its Facebook page.

=== Elsewhere ===
In December 2012, Stanton spent two weeks collecting street portraits in Iran. Following the Boston Marathon bombing, Stanton spent the week collecting street portraits in Boston, Massachusetts. During the 2014 SXSW conference, he spent a week in Austin, Texas, where the conference is held, to gather portraits of Texans.

In August 2014, Stanton began a 50-day "World Tour" in partnership with the United Nations collecting portraits and stories in twelve countries: Iraq, Jordan, Israel, Democratic Republic of the Congo, Kenya, Uganda, South Sudan, Ukraine, India, Nepal, Vietnam, and Mexico.

In August 2015, Stanton traveled to Pakistan for the photoblog. He used his work there to raise awareness of Syeda Ghulam Fatima's efforts to help Pakistani brickworkers that had become bonded laborers.

In association with the United Nations High Commissioner for Refugees (UNHCR), Stanton went to Europe in 2015 to capture migrants and refugees seeking asylum in Europe from their homelands, most of which are war zones. This resulted in much support, donations, and awareness of the European migrant crisis. Stanton stated in a BBC interview that he had to use a new type of interviewing style for these subjects, because he did not think it pertinent to ask about their past or future.

During the COVID-19 pandemic Stanton accepted submissions from anyone in the world for the first time, asking his followers for "their most amazing, uplifting stories" to inspire people during the crisis. Giving his reasoning, he said "I think what is helpful are these doses and reminders of normal life, normal happiness, normal joys, normal love."

== Books ==
Stanton's first book based on the photoblog, also titled Humans of New York, was released in October 2013. Published by St. Martin's Press, the book sold 30,000 copies in preorders alone. Stanton was interviewed ahead of release by Bill Weir for an ABC News Nightline story titled "'Humans of New York': Photo Gone Viral". As of March 2015, the book had been on The New York Times Best Seller list for 31 weeks and was the number one Non-Fiction Best Seller for a week in 2013 and again in 2014.

In October 2015, Stanton released his second book, Humans of New York: Stories, which focused more on the stories collected in his work. The book debuted in November 2015 at number one on The New York Times Best Sellers Nonfiction List of 2015, and was number one again the following month.

In October 2020, Stanton published a book titled Humans containing stories and portraits collected from his travels around the world. It reached #1 on the NYT Bestsellers' list on October 25, 2020.

In 2022, in collaboration with Stephanie Johnson, Stanton published the first longform piece of writing based on one of his subjects: Tanqueray. The Washington Post described it as, "A beautiful, sometimes shocking NC-17 story, kept out of the lily-white, upper crust canon of literature―until now."

== Philanthropy ==
Humans of New York has launched a number of highly successful charitable efforts. Following Hurricane Sandy, Stanton traveled to the hardest-hit neighborhoods in New York City to photograph the residents, volunteers, and first responders who had lived through the destruction. Stanton then partnered with Tumblr founder David Karp to launch an Indiegogo fundraiser for the victims of the storm. With an original goal of US$100,000, they raised $86,000 in the first 12 hours and reached a total of $318,530 by the end of the campaign. All of the proceeds went to the Stephen Siller Tunnel to Towers Foundation, a family-run charity that played a major role in the Hurricane Sandy relief efforts.

In 2013, HONY launched another Indiegogo campaign to help news cameraman Duane Watkins and his wife adopt a child from Ethiopia. The goal of $26,000 and was exceeded in 90 minutes and the campaign raised a total of $83,000. Excess funds went to an educational fund for the adopted boy and his sister.

In 2014, Stanton set up an Indiegogo campaign to send a boy he had photographed and his family on vacation to a ranch in Colorado after learning that the boy's dream was to own a horse. Within 15 minutes of posting the fundraiser on his Facebook page, the $7,000 goal was met and it raised a total of $32,167. After paying for the trip, Stanton donated the remaining $20,000 to the New York Therapeutic Riding Center, an organization that helps provide horse rides to children with disabilities.

Stanton, Mrs. Lopez, and Vidal visit the White House on February 5, 2015

In January 2015, Stanton photographed and interviewed a 14-year-old boy from Brownsville, Brooklyn, Vidal Chastanet, who said his greatest influence was his school principal at Mott Hall Bridges Academy, Nadia Lopez. Stanton used Indiegogo to raise over $1,419,509 in donations from 51,476 contributors that provided Mott Hall students opportunities such as college campus visits, summer programs, and a scholarship fund. As a result of the campaign, Stanton, the student, and his principal were invited to visit the White House in 2015. Later in 2015, Stanton visited Pakistan and Iran for a traveling photography series during the month of August. He concluded the section on Pakistan by highlighting Syeda Ghulam Fatima, the leader of the Bonded Labour Liberation Front, an organisation that works to free bonded labourers that were victims of predatory lending practices. Stanton's subsequent Indiegogo fundraiser raised over US$2.3 million for the organisation.

In May 2016, Stanton shared a series of interviews with pediatric cancer patients at the Memorial Sloan Kettering Cancer Center in New York City. Following the series, he launched an Indiegogo campaign to support pediatric cancer research at Memorial Sloan Kettering as well as psychological and social support services for patients and their families. In the first three days more than 10,000 people donated over $350,000, and in three weeks the campaign raised over $3.8 million from more than 100,000 people. In August 2016, in a photograph series titled, "Invisible Wounds," Stanton featured interviews with American veterans from the wars in Iraq and Afghanistan. The series partnered with the nonprofit, Headstrong Project, to highlight the mental health struggles veterans experience. An associated fundraising campaign for the non-profit exceeded the $100,000 goal in a few hours and continued to raise more than half a million dollars.

Stanton visited Rwanda in September 2018. Beginning on October 16, 2018, he began covering the genocide stories on his site through a series of interviews and photos from persons who were affected. On his site, he stated his objective: "During my week in Rwanda, I focused on the stories of people who took a moral stand during the genocide. These are members of the Hutu majority who risked their lives to shield and protect Tutsis. In Rwanda they are known as 'The Rescuers.'" In conjunction with the series, he hosted a GoFundMe campaign to benefit the Gisimba Orphanage in Rwanda and the planned but yet-to-be-built Gisimba House in Uganda. He supplemented the campaign with US$13,000 from HONY's Patreon fund, as well as with US$1 for every donation beyond the 5,000th donation. The campaign reached its goal of US$200,000 in 18 hours. Stanton also supported another campaign of the Little Hills organization, which plans build Rwanda's first children's hospital.

During the pandemic years of 2020–2022, Stanton raised nearly $8 million over 18 months for a variety of NYC-based individuals and small businesses featured on his platform.

=== DKNY ===
In 2013, a fan noticed that HONY's photos had been used without permission in DKNY's window display at a store in Bangkok. After learning of the infringement, Stanton publicly asked DKNY to donate US$100,000 in his name to the YMCA chapter in the Bedford-Stuyvesant neighborhood of New York City. The donation request was shared over 40,000 times on Facebook, and after heavy pressure on social media sites, DKNY issued a public apology and agreed to donate US$25,000. Stanton used Indiegogo to raise an additional $103,000.

=== Humans of New York: The Series ===
On August 29, 2017, the documentary Humans of New York: The Series, based on the blog, premiered on Facebook Watch as part of that premium content platform's launch. From 2014 to 2017, Stanton interviewed over 1200 New Yorkers on video. Season one included thirteen episodes which ranged from fifteen and twenty-five minutes in length and touched on common themes across the interviews. As of December 2017, it was the most followed series on Facebook Watch.

== Dear New York ==
In October 2025, Stanton staged Dear New York, a two-week immersive art installation at Grand Central Terminal. For the duration of the installation, all commercial advertising in the terminal was removed and replaced with portraits and stories drawn from the Humans of New York archive. The project was developed in partnership with the Metropolitan Transportation Authority, Juilliard, and the New York City Department of Education, and was accompanied by a companion book of the same name.

== See also ==
- Humans of Bombay
