= Yagazie Emezi =

Nigerian artist and photojournalist

Yagazie Emezie
- Born: March 2, 1989 (age 37)
- Years active: 2015–present
- Known for: photographer
- Website: https://www.yagazieemezi.com/

Yagazie Emezi (born March 2, 1989) is a Nigerian artist and self-taught independent photojournalist based in Lagos, Nigeria.

== Early life ==
Emezi, a native of Old Umuahia in Umuahia South, Abia State, was born March 2, 1989, and raised in Aba, Nigeria. She is the youngest of three siblings, her older sibling being Akwaeke Emezi. Their father was a Nigerian Igbo man and their mother was the daughter of Sri Lankan Tamil immigrants living in Malaysia.

== Career ==
Emezi started with photography in 2015 and has been commissioned by The Washington Post, National Geographic, Al-Jazeera, The New York Times, Vogue, Newsweek, Inc., TIME, The Guardian, Refinery29, Everyday Projects, The Weather Channel and The New York Times Magazine. In 2017, Emezi lived in Monrovia, Liberia for ten months documenting the impact of education for girls in at-risk communities and then returned to her ongoing project Re-learning Bodies which explores how trauma survivors, outside the narrative of violence and abuse, adapt to their new bodies while marking the absence of an effusive culture around body positivity as a noteworthy cultural phenomenon.

Emezi is a recipient of the 2018 inaugural Creative Bursary Award from Getty Images and was a 2018 participant of New York Portfolio Review. She has been featured by British Journal of Photography, Huffington Post, i-D, Nieman Reports, Paper, Vogue, CNN and The Washington Post. In 2018, she received a grant from the U.S Consulate General in Lagos for her photo-series addressing the reality of sexual violence against women and the vulnerable young in Lagos, Nigeria. In 2019, she became the first Black African woman to photograph for National Geographic Magazine and is a National Geographic Explorer Grantee. Yagazie was among the 2019 inaugural artists selected for Kehinde Wiley's art residency at Black Rock, Senegal. Her artistic photo-projects aim at criticizing Nigeria's socio-political state and the role media plays in it while pulling from the country's history and current events.

Emezi was a 2019 nominee to the prestigious Rolex Mentor and Protégé Arts Initiative. She serves on the advisory board of Everyday Africa and is a contributing member.

During the End SARS protests, Emezi was on the frontline of documenting the protests in Lagos.

== Talks ==
- 2019 Environmental Changes & Risks To Women's Health, Speaker, University of Global Health Equity, Kigali, Rwanda
- 2019 How Art Can Generate Better Health Outcomes, Speaker, Hamwe Festival. Kigali, Rwanda
- 2019 Chronic Conditions: Knowing, Seeing & Healing the Body in Global Africa, Speaker, University of Kansas. Kansas, USA
- 2018 Fast Forward: Women in Photography, Speaker, Lagos Photo Festival. Lagos, Nigeria
- 2018 Guest Lecture, Speaker, Parsons School of Design New York, USA
- 2017 Rethinking Creation in the Digital Age, Speaker, FCAEA & Everyday Africa. Nairobi, Kenya,
- 2016 Narratives Through Photography, Speaker, Social Media Week. Lagos, Nigeria.
- 2015 Limitations to Exploring Photography Off the Streets, Speaker, Rele Gallery, Lagos, Nigeria.
- 2015 Connecting to the Consumer, What We Know and How to Utilize it, Speaker, Mobile West Africa. Lagos, Nigeria.

== Awards and grants ==
- National Geographic 2020 Grantee.
- Recipient of the 2018 inaugural Creative Bursary Award from Getty Images.
- U.S Consulate 2018 Grant from The United States Consulate General Lagos, Nigeria.
- The 2017 Distinguished Alumnus Award from the University of New Mexico, African Studies Department.

== Exhibitions ==
- African Biennale of Photography, Bamako, Mali. 2019.
- The Female Lens, Richard Taittinger Gallery, New York, USA. 2019
- Relearning Bodies, Hamwe Festival, Kigali, Rwanda. 2019
- HERE, Alliance Francais, Lagos, Nigeria. 2019
- Present and Forgotten, Vlisco&Co, Art Twenty One. Lagos, Nigeria. 2018
- Festival Pil’ours, Saint Gilles Croix de Vie, France. 2018
- Insider/Outsider, Women Photograph, Photoville. New York, USA. 2017
- Body Talk, Refinery29, Photoville. New York, USA, 2017
- Re-picturing a Continent, Alliance Francais, Everyday Africa. Nairobi, Kenya. 2017
- LOOK3 Festival of the Photograph, Charlottesville, USA. 2016
- The Everyday Projects at FotoIstanbul, Istanbul, Turkey. 2016
