= CATS: Crash Arena Turbo Stars =

2017 video game by Zeptolab

C.A.T.S.: Crash Arena Turbo Stars
- Game Launch Screen
- Publisher: Nazara Publishing (previously ZeptoLab)
- Release: April 19, 2017
- Genre: Fighting
- Mode: Multiplayer

CATS: Crash Arena Turbo Stars is a free-to-play PvP fighting game developed by ZeptoLab for mobile devices. The game focuses on assembling cars equipped with weapons and sending them into automated battles against another player. As its acronym implies, the game is themed around cats.

== Gameplay ==
The core of the game is to assemble and upgrade a fighting vehicle that can best other players in 1v1 matches. The player lacks control over the fight itself, as the cats automatically drive the vehicles. Each fight is typically very short, on the scale of seconds. If the fight draws on for too long, two bulldozers begin to close in the arena, instantly killing the player upon contact.

To start customizing the vehicles, the player must choose a chassis, which feature varying shapes and attachment points for other parts. The player can then attach various wheels, weapons, and other boost items. Some item combinations give the vehicle a bonus, such as extra health points. A 148Apps review noted that the game's fast-paced nature encourages players to frequently swap and upgrade their gear as the competition intensifies. New parts can be unlocked by unlocking crates. The player can also fuse two items together for a stronger one.

=== Monetization ===
The game features gacha boxes that the player must wait to open, following an Asian video game trend. The waiting time can be sped up by watching advertisements or using gems, the game's premium currency. The game also has the soft currency of coins. Gems can be obtained by buying bundles with real-life money or by playing the game naturally.

== Development ==
Following the success of the Cut the Rope franchise, ZeptoLab grew to 120 employees, with teams in Barcelona and Moscow. It took four people eight months to finish the initial version, after which the game was soft-launched in Austria, Sweden, and later Canada, with the team expanding to more than 12. After undergoing pre-release under the name "Backyard Battles", CATS was released on April 19, 2017. The decision to have cats drive the vehicles came late into development, as the team felt it was hard for players to empathize with "soulless chunks of metal". CATS was the next ZeptoLab game after King of Thieves.

According to ZeptoLab, the game was downloaded more than 8 million times in the first weekend following the release, and reached more than 60 million downloads in four months. It became one of the most downloaded 2017 games on Google Play. ZeptoLab also published an iMessage sticker pack based on the game. In January 2025, ZeptoLab sold CATS and King of Thieves to Nazara Technologies for US$7.7 million.

== Reception ==
Many reviewers compared CATS to the TV series Robot Wars, in which contestants build remote-controlled robots to destroy one another. PocketGamer.biz noted the game's similarity with ZeptoLab's previous game King of Thieves, such as the focus on user-created content.

148Apps praised the fast-paced nature of the battles, but criticized the game's free-to-play mechanics, particularly the wait times required to upgrade or unlock new parts, and the currency needed to fuse parts together. In contrast, PocketGamer.biz praised CATS for its "smart monetisation design that shows the benefit of spending, but doesn't feel too punishing for those who choose not to".

Gamezebo recommended the game for "those that enjoy being behind the scenes", but commented that the lack of direct control and action may deter some players. PocketGamer.com shared the same stance, writing that CATS is "very much a casual game of putting things in place and seeing what happens."

Many reviewers also praised the game's visuals. Gamezebo described it as "terrific[ally] rich and warm".

The game was nominated for the 14th global International Mobile Gaming Awards (IMGA), becoming a finalist. Google Play named the game as the "Best game of 2017". Common Sense Media listed the game as being suitable for ages 8 and above.
