= Everyday Pakistan =

- Website type: Photoblog
- Owner: Anas Saleem
- Commercial: No
- Launched: February 2018

Everyday Pakistan is a photoblog and a collective of photographers from Pakistan.

Started in February 2018 by photojournalist Anas Saleem, the blog has more than 100,000 followers on Instagram.

== Awards ==
Everyday Pakistan was one of the winners for the year 2019 in the category Citizen Media & Journalism for visually breaking stereotypes and bridging cultural gaps by Social Media for Empowerment awards.
