= Personalized video game =

A personalized video game is created for one specific player or a group of players usually as a luxury gift, similar to personalized books. It features real names, places and events from the recipient's life. Usual occasions for such games are birthdays, anniversaries, and engagement proposals.

== History ==
Personalized video games were given as luxury gifts almost from the beginning of the game industry. A famous example includes a game given in 2002 by Kevin Smith to Ben Affleck and Jennifer Lopez. In the game Lopez has to find and rescue Affleck, who has been kidnapped.

One of the first professional personalized video games service was created by Abdel Bounane in 2011 and was called Amuze Me. The costs of one game could run up to $67,000. “Amuse Me makes personalized games in one’s image, like having your portrait made by a painter,” said Florent Deloison, one of the service's game artists.

In 2014, Netherlands-based developer TinglyGames launched its Greeting Games, an online program that lets users customize and send casual games within digital greeting cards. Unlike Amuse Me, TinglyGames worked as a self-service and the games were not hand-made.
