= Cut the Rope 2 =

2013 video game

- iOS app icon
- Developer: ZeptoLab
- Publisher: ZeptoLab
- Series: Cut the Rope
- Platforms: iOS, Android
- Release: iOS; December 19, 2013; Android; March 28, 2014
- Genre: Puzzle
- Mode: Single-player

Cut the Rope 2 is a physics-based puzzle video game developed and published by ZeptoLab for iOS and Android (formerly Windows). Acting as a direct sequel to Cut the Rope, the game focuses on Om Nom going on an adventure to retrieve his stolen candy supply.

== Gameplay ==
Just as in the original Cut the Rope game, the main goal is to cut ropes to get candy to Om Nom. However, this game introduces Om Nom's ability to move across the screen just as the candy can as well as several other creatures, such as Roto, Lick, Blue, Toss, and Boo, who each have different abilities to help the player complete each level. The Android version of the game includes an overworld, an energy system, different power-ups and alternate missions for each level that require the player to collect fruit-shaped bubbles rather than stars.

== Reception ==
Like the first game, Cut the Rope 2 was generally well-received by critics. The review aggregator Metacritic has an average score of 81 out of 100, indicating "generally favorable" reviews. Leah B. Jackson of IGN praised Om Nom's animations as well as the new characters added but noted the game's short length and deemed its power-ups unnecessary. Jason Cipriani of CNET praised all of the game's new features but criticized the microtransactions. Max Eddy of PCMag praised the gameplay of the Android version, calling the in-app purchases and energy system "well-balanced", though he criticized the occasional interference of video advertisements.
