= Fazeelat Aslam =

Pakistani documentary filmmaker and journalist

- Born: Fazeelat Aslam; Lahore, Pakistan
- Education: Wellesley College
- Occupations: Journalist, filmmaker
- Known for: Saving Face (2012)

Fazeelat Aslam is a Pakistani documentary filmmaker and journalist based in New York City. She is also co-producer of the Academy Award-winning documentary Saving Face.

== Early life and career ==
Fazeelat Aslam was born in Lahore, Pakistan. Later her family moved to Zambia and then to Karachi. She attended high school in London and graduated from Wellesley College in the United States, where she double majored in Media Studies and Gender Studies. Fazeelat returned to Pakistan and started a career as a news anchor at National News prior to joining Dawn News. Shortly after, she left the company to create documentaries. Fazeelat has produced documentaries for international organizations including PBS Frontline, Channel 4 UK and HBO. She worked as a producer and correspondent for the second season of Vice documentary on HBO. Fazeelat went to the brick kilns to investigate the conditions of modern slavery, where she interviewed a female bonded labourer for the 'Episode 2 Extended: Forced Slavery Interview', that covered the humanitarian work of Syeda Ghulam Fatima. In 2012 Fazeelat made an appearance in a video of the song ‘Awaam’, by rapper Faris Shafi.
