= Pudding Monsters =

2012 video game

- Developer: ZeptoLab
- Publishers: ZeptoLab; QubicGames (Switch)
- Platforms: iOS, Android, Nintendo Switch
- Release: iOS; December 19, 2012; Android; December 21, 2012; Switch; February 25, 2022
- Genre: Puzzle video game
- Mode: Single-player

Pudding Monsters is a puzzle video game developed by ZeptoLab for iOS and Android in 2012, and for Nintendo Switch in 2022. It focuses on live clumps of pudding working to avoid being eaten by combining themselves into a monster to scare humans who want to eat them.

On February 14th, 2026, Pudding Monsters was delisted from the App Store and the Google Play Store.

== Reception ==
Reception

Aggregate score
Aggregator	Score
Metacritic	(NS) 75/100 (iOS) 73/100

Review scores
Publication	Score
Game Informer	(iOS) 7/10
Gamezebo	(iOS) 4/5
IGN	(iOS) 7.3/10
Jeuxvideo.com	16/20
MacLife	(iOS) 3.5/5
MeriStation	7.5/10
Pocket Gamer	3.5/5
TouchArcade	(iOS) 3/5
Common Sense Media	(iOS) 3/5
Digital Spy	(iOS) 2/5

The Switch version received "generally favorable reviews", while the iOS version received "mixed or average reviews", according to the review aggregation website Metacritic.
