= Dear New York =

2025 art installation by Brandon Stanton

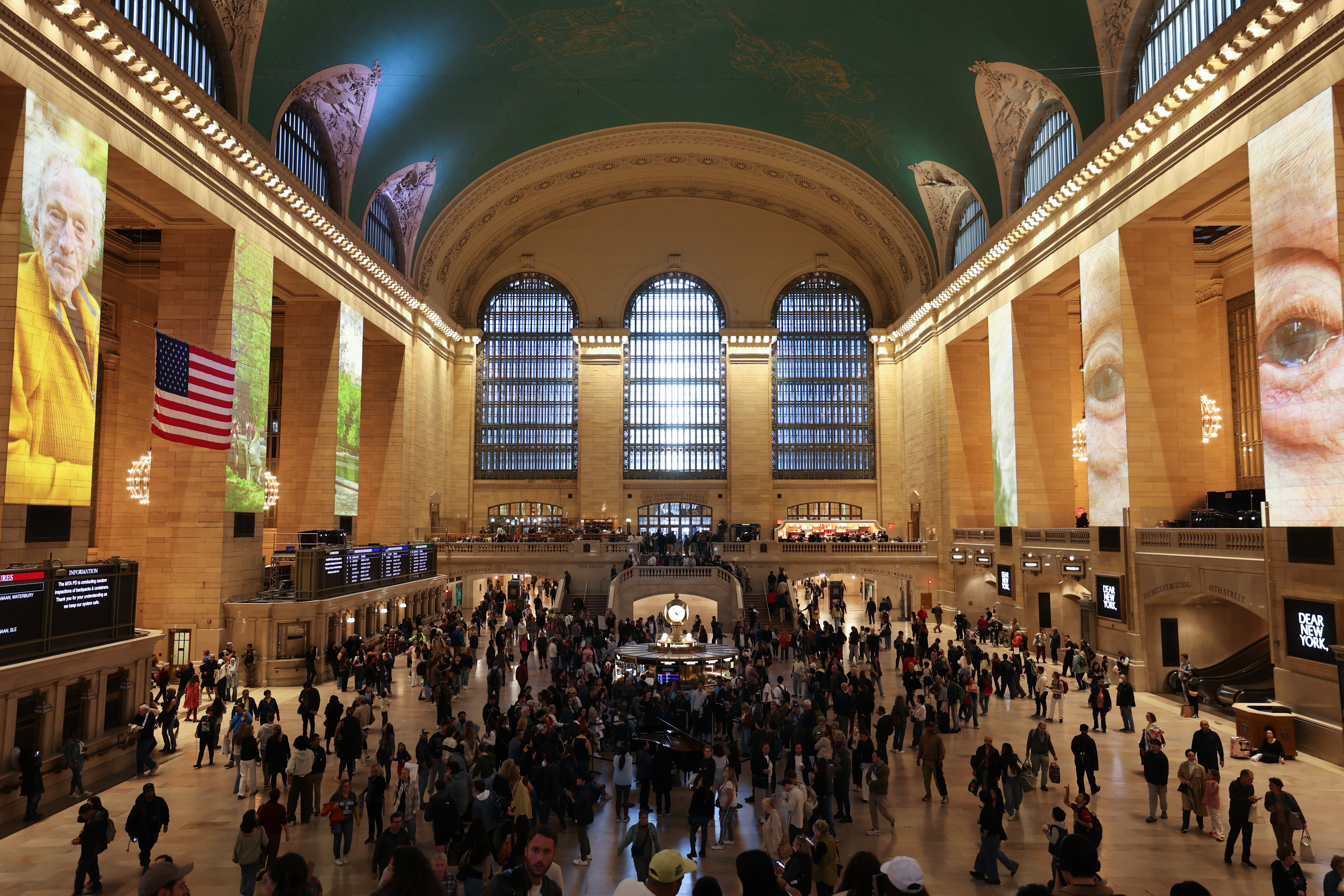
- Part of the installation in Grand Central Terminal's Main Concourse
- Date: October 6–19, 2025
- Venue: Grand Central Terminal
- Location: New York City, U.S.
- Type: Public art installation

Dear New York was a large-scale immersive art installation at New York City's Grand Central Terminal created by American artist and photographer Brandon Stanton, founder of Humans of New York. The installation sought to transform the terminal into a living portrait of the city. It ran from October 6–19, 2025.

== Background ==
Dear New York was developed as a continuation of long-term documentary work in New York City conducted by Stanton over more than fifteen years. The project featured material from residents across the city, including photographic portraits and narratives of everyday urban life.

=== Funding and development ===
The cost of the exhibition was not publicized, but Stanton reported that he paid all costs including revenue lost from advertisements, which cost "most of the money that [Stanton] saved from the past 15 years of doing 'Humans of New York'".

The installation's creative director of experience was David Korins, who had also worked on Broadway musicals Hamilton and Dear Evan Hansen. Korins said of the installation, "we've intentionally captured every single square inch of advertisement—plus much, much more surface area—not to bombard people, but to engulf them. We want this to wash over you like a meditation. For some, it'll be a mirror; for others, a portal into deep empathy". The installation's creative director of design was Andrea Trabucco-Campos, a partner at New York design firm Pentagram. Trabucco-Campos noted that the space offered unique challenges: "Designing a public gallery in a place where four subway lines converge—with no real entry or exit point—was unlike anything we'd done before. You can't build a single, linear story down there. The space demands something dynamic—something you can step into at any moment and still understand". Pentagram also developed a "typographic system inspired by the station's early mosaics".

The installation was created in collaboration with several New York City-based organizations in the fields of education, public infrastructure, and the arts, including the Metropolitan Transportation Authority, Juilliard, and the New York City Department of Education. The project was accompanied by a book, Dear New York, which compiled a large number of photographic portraits and narratives collected during the project.

== Installation ==
For the two weeks between October 6 and 19, 2025, Grand Central Terminal served as the site of the immersive installation. All commercial advertising within the terminal was removed, and digital screens throughout the terminal and the connected New York City Subway station at Grand Central–42nd Street were replaced with photographic portraits and accompanying stories drawn from the Humans of New York collection. According to press releases by organizers, this marked the first time "in living memory" that all advertising was removed from the terminal. It also marked the first time that "the Metropolitan Transportation Authority has unified its digital displays across both the terminal and its subway concourse". The MTA described the project as "the most extensive use of physical subway space in its history".

The installation included large-scale projections in the Main Concourse of Grand Central Terminal. These projections measured approximately 50 feet in height and displayed photographic works. Over 1,000 artists contributed to the initiative. Photographs and corresponding text were also presented across the subway platforms for the 4, 5, 6, <6>, 7, <7>, and S trains, extending the installation throughout the broader transit environment.

As part of the project, live musical performances were presented by students, alumni, and faculty from the Juilliard School, totaling over 100 hours and often centered on a grand piano placed in Grand Central Terminal's Main Concourse. In conjunction with the musical program, a community art exhibition was installed in Vanderbilt Hall, featuring photography and visual works created by 11 local photographers and 600 New York City public school students. The local photographers were chosen through an open call for "street photographers who documented their own communities". Similarly, the student artists were also chosen through an open call.

== Reception ==
Artnet and Time Out described it as one of the largest public art installations in New York in decades, while The New York Times, Smithsonian and New York Post focused on the transformation of advertising screens at the Grand Central Terminal into a video art installation.
