= Syeda Ghulam Fatima =

Pakistani human and labor rights activist

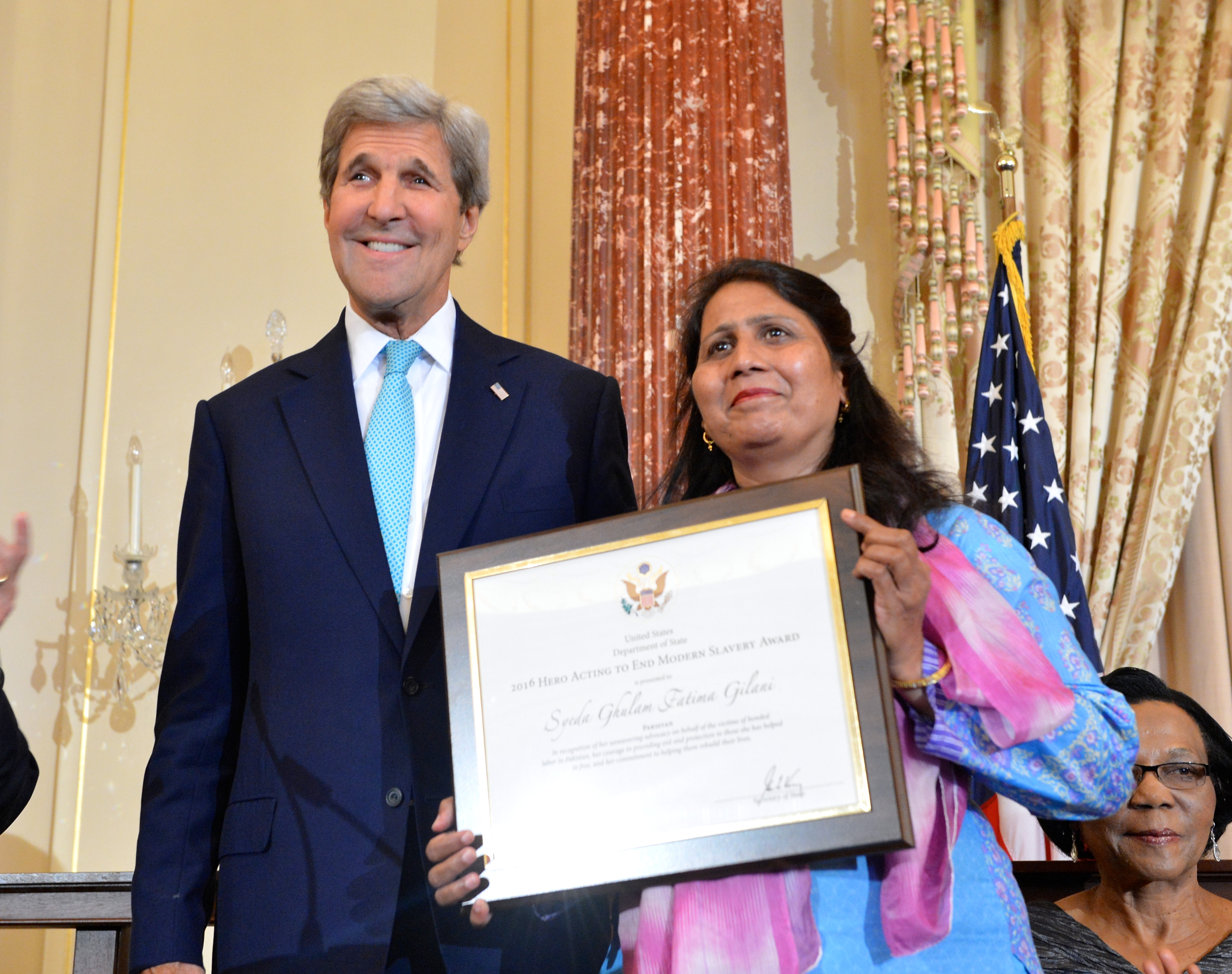
- Syeda Ghulam Fatima during the ceremony of Aurora Prize, Leymah Gbowee, Syeda Ghulam Fatima, Vartan Gregorian. She is standing next to John Kerry.
- Born: Pakistan
- Citizenship: Pakistani
- Occupations: Activist, General Secretary 'Bonded Labour Liberation Front Pakistan' (BLLF)
- Website: bllfpk.com

Syeda Ghulam Fatima is a Pakistani human and labour rights activist, known for her work in ending bonded labour in brick kilns, and is General Secretary of Lahore-based Bonded Labour Liberation Front Pakistan (BLLF).

== Biography ==
Fatima holds a master's degree in Political Science from Punjab University. She has been campaigning for workers' rights and against bonded labor in Pakistani brick factories, commonly referred to as kilns. She has been threatened, attacked, and wounded because of her activism. Through her organization, the Bonded Labor Liberation Front, Fatima has established Freedom Centers where workers can go for protection and legal counsel. She is the elected General Secretary of Bonded Labor Liberation Front Pakistan. Alongside her husband, Fatima runs BLLF from a storefront in Lahore.

She helped to release more than 80,000 bonded laborers in Pakistan from all provinces since her engagement, and trained more than 600 women in alternative skills for poverty reduction. In September 2015, Fatima was awarded a Clinton Global Citizen Award for "leadership in civil society" in New York.

In March 2016 Fatima was one of four finalists nominated for the Aurora Prize for Awakening Humanity, an award given to humanitarians in memory of the Armenian genocide

== Media coverage ==
In August 2015, Fatima and the Bonded Labor Liberation Front received international attention when they were featured in a 7-part series by the popular internet photojournalism Facebook page, Humans of New York. ( photo block of New York) 7 photos were published on her life and work for the human rights especially for bonded labors. Also shared was the official YouTube video featuring the 2014 EMI award-winning Vice documentary episode about her work, aired on HBO, that links to the 'Episode 2 Extended: Forced Slavery Interview' by the award-winning journalist Fazeelat Aslam. As the result of an appeal by the Facebook page, over $2,300,000 USD was raised in several days for the BLLF.

=== Struggles ===
For more than 38 years Fatima has campaigned for the rights and liberation of bounded laborers. She began her advocacy by engaging in discussions with women working under bonded labor conditions and raising awareness of their rights through educational initiatives. During her visits with colleagues and teachers, members of the group reportedly faced intimidation and violence; one of her teachers was severely beaten, leading some of her companions to stop accompanying her. Fatima, however, continued her work.

As part of her advocacy, she helped improve basic facilities for bonded laborers by providing access to drinking water and sanitation, including six toilets for women and four for men. She organized programs, rallies marking International Workers' Day, and seminars for women laborers, through which around 300 women received training in alternative vocational skills. Fatima also petitioned the Supreme Court of Pakistan on issues related to bonded labor. Her advocacy coincided with the enactment of the Bonded Labor System (Abolition) Act in 1992 and the adoption of implementing rules in 1995.

== See also ==
- The State of Bonded Labor in Pakistan
- Debt bondage in India
- Slavery in Pakistan
- Child labour in Pakistan
- Human rights in Pakistan
- Feudalism in Pakistan
- Brick Kiln Slavery - Pakistan
- Struggles of Syeda Ghulam Fatima
