= Nazara Technologies =

Indian video game development company

- Company type: Public
- Traded as: NSE: NAZARA; BSE: 543280
- ISIN: INE418L01021
- Industry: Video games; Technology; Mobile gaming; Sports media; Esports
- Founded: 1999; 27 years ago
- Founder: Nitish Mittersain
- Headquarters: Mumbai, Maharashtra, India
- Area served: Worldwide
- Key people: Vikash Mittersain (chairman and MD); Nitish Mittersain (CEO and joint MD)
- Revenue: ▲₹1,138 crore (US$120 million) (FY24)
- Net income: ▲₹89 crore (US$9.3 million) (FY24)
- Subsidiaries: WildWorks; Nextwave Multimedia; Kiddopia; Sportskeeda; Nodwin Gaming; Fusebox Games; Curve Games
- Website: www.nazara.com

Nazara Technologies is an Indian video game development company that has business interests in mobile games, esports, and sports media. Founded in 1999, it is based in Mumbai, India, and through the years acquired several companies turned into subsidiaries, including WildWorks, Curve Games, and Sportskeeda.

== History ==
Nazara Technologies was founded in Mumbai by Nitish Mittersain as an online gaming portal in 1999, a year prior to the dotcom bust. In 2002, it switched to providing mobile entertainment VAS for telecom operators, including WAP content downloads of comic strips and mobile games. Early likeness rights partnerships to deliver mobile content included those with Archie Comics, Sachin Tendulkar, MS Dhoni, and Cartoon Network. Nazara later expanded mobile games VAS into the Middle East and Africa, also becoming the licensed digital distributor of EA Mobile's games in these regions apart from South Asian countries.

In 2015, Nazara obtained the license from Green Gold Animations to create mobile games based on Chhota Bheem animated television series. In 2016, Nazara tied up with Indian comics company Amar Chitra Katha to develop mobile games on Tinkle characters like Shikari Shambu. In 2018, Nazara acquired a majority stake in Nextwave Multimedia, a Chennai-based mobile game developer known for World Cricket Championship titles. It also acquired 55% stake in esports firm Nodwin Gaming. Nazara was planning to go public in 2018 and had obtained approval from the market regulators, but halted the process. In 2019, Nazara Technologies purchased a 67% stake in Sportskeeda for ₹44 crore. It acquired a 51% stake in Paper Boat Apps, the developer and publisher of gamified early learning app Kiddopia, for ₹83.5 crore in the same year.

In March 2021, Nazara was listed on the NSE and BSE after its initial public offering. Later the same year, it acquired the Hyderabad-based real-money gaming company OpenPlay for ₹186 crore. In 2022, Nazara acquired a 55% stake in Datawrkz, an advertising technology company based in Bangalore, for ₹124 crore. Later that year, it bought out the US-based kids gaming company WildWorks for $10.4 million. In 2023, Nazara Technologies joined the All India Gaming Federation (AIGF) as a principal member. In 2024, Nazara acquired Comic Con India for ₹55 crore through its subsidiary Nodwin Gaming. On 8 Augus, 2024, it was announced that Nazara had acquired UK based Fusebox Games for $27.2 million. The company is known for making Love Island-themed games since 2018.

In September 2024, Nazara Technologies acquired 47.7% stake in Moonshine Technology, the parent company of PokerBaazi for Rs 832 crore. As of the 2024 fiscal year, the company reported an increased revenue and net income, respectivaly at ₹1,138 crore (US$130 million) and ₹89 crore (US$11 million). In January 2025, Nazara Technologies bought two mobile games King of Thieves and CATS: Crash Arena Turbo Stars from Zeptolab for USD 7.7 million. In May 2025, Nazara Technologies acquired Smaaash Entertainment, an arcade franchise from India that was rebranded as Zoreko a year prior, which provides on-venue activities like bowling, go-karting, and arcade gaming, as well as dining and drinking. Also in May 2025, Nazara Technologies acquired British indie game publisher Curve Games, whose released titles include Human: Fall Flat.

== Subsidiaries ==
=== Sportskeeda ===
Sportskeeda logo

Sportskeeda is a global sports and esports media subsidiary of Nazara Technologies headquartered in Bangalore, India. It features news, articles, and live coverage of sports such as cricket, association football, American football, basketball, mixed martial arts, and professional wrestling. In 2009, the company was founded by Porush Jain. After a few months, the company raised an undisclosed amount of funding from angel investors. In 2011, an early stage venture capital funding company, Seedfund, invested ₹2.8 crore.

In 2019, Nazara Technologies acquired a 67% stake in Sportskeeda for ₹44 crore, valuing Sportskeeda at ₹65 crore. In 2020, during the COVID-19 pandemic, the company launched two video series: Freehit and SKlive, featuring interviews with prominent sportspeople. In May 2022, Nazara set up its subsidiary Sportskeeda Inc. in Delaware, US. In November 2022, Porush Jain resigned as CEO and Ajay Pratap Singh was promoted to take his place. In 2023, Sportskeeda acquired a 73.27% stake in Pro Football Network LLC, a US-based sports analysis website that covers the NFL and college football, for ₹16 crore (US$1.82 million). In 2024, Nazara Technologies further acquired 19.35 % for ₹145.5 crore in Absolute Sports, the parent company of Sportskeeda, increasing its total ownership to 91%. In 2025, Nazara Technologies acquired Curve Games, the parent company of Sportskeeda, 100% for ₹247 crore, increasing its total ownership to 100%.

== Games ==
- World Cricket Championship
- Kiddopia
- Animal Jam Classic
- Motu Patlu Run
