= Carl Wilkens =

American activist

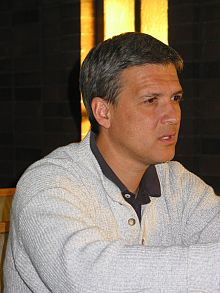
- Born: 1958 (age 67–68); Takoma Park, Maryland, U.S.
- Occupations: Former head of the Adventist Development and Relief Agency International in Rwanda
- Known for: Only American who chose to remain in Rwanda after the Rwandan genocide began

Carl Wilkens (born 1958) is an American Christian missionary and the former head of the Adventist Development and Relief Agency International in Rwanda. In 1994, he was the only American who chose to remain in the country after the Rwandan genocide began.

Since 1978, when he first went to Africa as part of a college volunteer program, Wilkens had already spent 13 years working on the continent. After training as a high-school teacher, he later went back to night school and earned an MBA at the University of Baltimore.

== Career ==
=== Beginning of the genocide ===
In early 1994, Wilkens was in Rwanda with his wife and three children. As the Rwandan genocide began, he sent them with a U.S. convoy to Burundi (U.S. officials were afraid to use Kigali's airport, so they evacuated their citizens by cars) and stayed in his home in Kigali. Wilkens knew that he could not leave his friends, many of whom were Tutsis. His family had hired two workers who were Tutsi, Juan and Anita, to help out around the house. He feared that they may be harmed if he did not stay. His decision was made during conversations with his wife, Teresa, recalling that "Teresa and I would go back to the bedroom and we would talk, because we had made a decision that I wouldn't evacuate. We would pray, and I'd say, 'Does this still seem right?' and she said, 'Yes, it does'." Wilkens stayed in Rwanda even as others fled, including many high ranking U.S. officials. No one was more surprised by his decision to remain in Rwanda than the Rwandan people. Thomas Kayumba, Carl's co-worker, said that "All the foreigners left, but not Wilkens. He was still young. To take leave of his little children and his wife, to give himself to the Rwandan people, I don’t know how to explain it."

=== Gisimba Orphanage ===
The first three weeks were spent in his house with trustworthy Tutsis seeking refuge, but when there was a possibility to go out and do anything to people, who were slaughtered every day, sometimes just meters away, he gave his all to help them. Wilkens saved about 400 people from the Gisimba Orphanage.

One day, when Carl arrived at Gisimba, he saw more than 50 armed militiamen who were waiting for an occasion to kill everyone inside the orphanage. His presence there stopped anyone from being killed. Wilkens decided to sleep with the kids that night to make sure they were safe. He stayed there until, using all his connections, he found four guards to guard the people inside the orphanage. He jumped into his car to find the governor, who could help him to save the orphans. When he was in his office, the Hutu prime minister Jean Kambanda, was there and someone told Wilkens to ask him for help. Wilkens described the situation with these words: "'Ask him?' It's like that's the stupidest thing you could imagine - to ask this guy who is obviously orchestrating the genocide, a key player, and yet I have no other options. … [He's like], 'Just go out in the hallway. He's in the next office. When he comes out, ask him." So I went out [into the hallway] … and [a] door opens. Everybody snaps to attention, and here comes [the prime minister] and his little entourage. They're coming down the hall, and I am, too. I put my hand out and I said, 'Mr. Prime Minister, I'm Carl Wilkens, the director of ADRA.' He stops and he looks at me, and then he takes my hand and shakes it and said, 'Yes, I've heard about you and your work. How is it?' I said, 'Well, honestly, sir, it's not very good right now. The orphans at Gisimba are surrounded, and I think there's going to be a massacre, if there hasn't been already.' He turns around, talks to some of his aides or whatever, [and he turns back to me and] he says, 'We're aware of the situation, and those orphans are going to be safe. I'll see to it.'"

And it worked; the prime minister agreed to make sure that nothing would happen to the orphans. But Wilkens, who was afraid of another militiamen attempt to kill people inside Gisimba, decided to move survivors to a safe haven - the Saint Michel Cathedral. Again, he used his connections and in few days, he organized two buses and a military escort, which was to help them to get through the most dangerous roadblocks. Wilkens negotiated with armed men on the way to the cathedral. In the end, everyone on the buses was transported to Saint Michel alive and unharmed.

=== Vaiter Orphanage and Nyamirambo Adventist Church ===
This was a quite similar situation to that in Gisimba. The orphanage was run by a Frenchman, Marc Vaiter, and before April 1994 its main goal was to take care of 16 HIV-positive orphans. But during the genocide it was a hiding place for about 100 children. They did not have drinking water and were running out of food and it was just then that Wilkens appeared, bringing most needed supplies. None of the children spoke English nor did Carl speak Kinyarwanda, so at first children who did not know his name called him: ADRA SOS (it was written on his car). When the situation became critical (there was fighting going on between RPF and Hutu army in the area where orphanage was situated), again Wilkens tried to relocate survivors to Saint Michel Cathedral. His obstinacy allowed him to do it once again. People from the orphanage were safe.

He did the same for 12 survivors from Adventist Church in Nyamirambo. They were transported to the safe haven in Hôtel des Mille Collines.

Wilkens reminisces that the situation during genocide was very complex, and that he was working often on the edge of law and morality: "I was in so many positions that could have been interpreted as compromising or even collaborating with the enemy. … Who's going to believe someone who goes to court and says, 'Well, actually I asked [the prime minister] to help me save some Tutsis?' Who's going to believe that? The stuff in the genocide just turns." Wilkens negotiated to save lives with Col. Tharcisse Renzaho - governor of Kigali and with prime minister Jean Kambanda later sentenced to life imprisonment by International Criminal Tribunal for Rwanda (ICTR). General Romeo Dallaire faced a same dilemma, debating whether it was morally acceptable to "shake hands with the Devil" in order to save someone's life. However, the effects of such negotiations - thousands of saved human lives - made some feel that it was worthy to pay the price.

=== After RPF's victory ===
When the units of Rwandan Patriotic Front took over Kigali on July 4, 1994, it was not still the end of service for Wilkens. Asked by RPF's officials, he helped distribute water, food and supplies to inhabitants of Kigali. It was the case of for example Saint Andre College in Nyamirambo (where there were about 12,000 people) and Kacyiru camp for the internally displaced.

He also tried to find all his ADRA co-workers. Many times, such actions ended with a happy end. One of the most moving moments took place near Gitarama, when he found Amiel Gahima: "As we walked past the town of Gitarama towards Kigali, I abruptly saw a pick up truck with the ADRA flag. The vehicle suddenly stopped as it approached us. I couldn’t believe my eyes when I saw Carl Wilkens coming towards me from the vehicle. As he saw me, emaciated and frail, carrying my three-year-old son on my shoulders, he was in tears."

=== Return to Rwanda and present day ===
When he finally ended his mission, he went back to the United States. But in 1995 he, his wife Teresa and their 3 children returned to Rwanda and for the next 18 months Wilkens worked for the Adventist Church on reconstruction projects. Since 1996, Wilkens has been living in the U.S. and he became an Adventist pastor and is working in Milo Adventist Academy in Days Creek, Oregon. He visits Rwanda from time to time to see his friends and co-workers. When he was giving a sermon in Kigali in December 2005, crowd of over 3,000 people attended his service.

Wilkens tours the United States to speak to students, teachers, and parents about his experience in Rwanda. He has spoken at schools such as Clarke Central High School in Athens, Georgia, Mission San Jose High School in Fremont, California, St. Joseph's Collegiate Institute, Glenbrook North High School in Northbrook, Illinois, Nashville Community High School in Nashville, Illinois, Avon High School in Avon, Connecticut, and at Elon University in Elon, North Carolina. During his talks, he describes his experiences in Rwanda and how to stay positive by doing things such as creating new brain pathways.

On 25 January 2012, Wilkens spoke to high school students at the Al Yasmina school in Abu Dhabi of his experiences in Rwanda, and promoted his new book.

Wilkens also spoke during the 2014 GIN Abu Dhabi Conference in NYU Abu Dhabi, to a group of high school and university students.

On 26–27 April 2014, Wilkens spoke to students at several international schools in Taipei of his experiences in Rwanda, and was selling his book during a Model United Nations conference.

== See also ==
- Roméo Dallaire
- Paul Kagame
- Bibliography of the Rwandan genocide
- Rwandan Patriotic Front
- United Nations Assistance Mission for Rwanda
