= Everyday Mumbai =

- Website type: Photoblog
- Owner: Chirag Wakaskar
- Website: Everyday Mumbai on Instagram
- Commercial: No
- Launched: July 2014
- Current status: Online

Everyday Mumbai is a photoblog and collective of photographers capturing daily life in Mumbai (also known as Bombay), India.

It was started in July 2014 by photojournalist Chirag Wakaskar. The blog is using Instagram as its primary platform.

== Awards ==
Everyday Mumbai was one of the Winner for the year 2017 in the category Citizen Media & Journalism for creating a crowd-sourced photography community by Social Media for Empowerment.

== See also ==
- Humans of Bombay
