= King of Thieves (video game) =

2016 video game

- Logo
- Publisher: Nazara Publishing
- Release: February 12, 2015
- Genre: Platformer
- Mode: Multiplayer

King of Thieves is a multiplayer PvP platform video game developed by ZeptoLab for iOS, Android and Windows Phone. The players must steal gems from user-generated dungeons and fortify their dungeon to protect against attacks.

== Gameplay ==
King of Thieves is two-dimensional one-screen multiplayer game. The game incorporates PvP and platforming. A player controls an acrobatic blob-like creature, with a one-tap control scheme. Every player owns a home base, also known as the dungeon, where their golds and gems can be stored. Each dungeon is equipped with a totem, where gems can be combined into one, leading to a gem with higher value. Since the gem storage is limited, players must continue combining to obtain more gems. However, there is a catch: while performing the gem-combining ritual, the totem becomes vulnerable to theft attempts from other players.

In order to raid other's dungeons, players need to use lockpicks to unlock the lock to the door. The lock has several decoys and only one true keyhole, and the player has to guess which is the true keyhole, and sometimes has to spend multiple lockpicks to enter the dungeon. The lockpicks are in a limited quantity.

Kotaku and VentureBeat described the game's asynchronous gameplay as being similar to Clash of Clans.

== Development and release ==
After 16 months of development, Zeptolab released the game for iOS on 12 February 2015. The Android release followed on March. In 2016, the game reached 24 million downloads. It is made with Box2D physics engine. In January 2025, Zeptolab sold King of Thieves and CATS: Crash Arena Turbo Stars to Nazara Technologies for USD 7.7 million.

- Official release trailer

== Reception ==
Reception

Aggregate score
Aggregator	Score
Metacritic	69

Review scores
Publication	Score
IGN	7.9/10
Pocket Gamer	3/5
TouchArcade	3/5
Gamezebo	4/5
Common Sense Media	3/5
Multiplayer.it	6/10
148apps.com	3/5

King of Thieves has received mixed reviews.

The game's lockpick system was a common source of criticism. Gamezebo said that the randomness of the lock can be frustrating, as some lock may take many lockpicks before opening, exhausting the player's supply. TouchArcade said that this was a "poor implementation of an energy system" and that a rate limit is against the heart of a challenging trial platformer. Pocket Gamer wrote "the monetisation element which borders on the contentious are the lockpicks". Another Pocket Gamer article said that the key system breaks immersion when the player is "just getting into things". IGN said that the lockpick system forces players to wait and can be irritating. However, Windows Central had a more positive view, saying that "it didn't feel as restrictive as other models". Common Sense Media said that the biggest flaw was the key system, where 10 or more lockpicks may be used. GryOnline wrote that "entire session with the game ends after a few minutes" due to the limited amount of keys.

Kotaku criticized the game's asynchronous multiplayer system, which allows players to prevent raids on their stash. They mentioned instances where players stay online, under a shield, or already under attack, making it impossible for others to retaliate.

Common Sense Media gave an age rating of 13+.

Year	Award	Category	Result	Ref
2016	International Mobile Gaming Awards	Best Multiplayer Game	Nominated	
