= 2013 Webby Awards =

US internet awards ceremony

The 17th annual Webby Awards for 2013 was held at the Hammerstein Ballroom in New York City on May 22, 2013, hosted by comedian Patton Oswalt. It was streamed live at www.webbyawards.com.

The Lifetime Achievement award was presented to Steve Wilhite, inventor of the GIF file format. The viral Australian public service campaign Dumb Ways to Die led the other nominees for total number of awards received, and The Onion achieved a record 19th win.

== Nominees and winners ==
Category	Webby Award winner	People's Voice winner	Other nominees
Games	Angry Birds Star Wars (Archived 5 May 2013 via Wayback); Luxus		Disney Games (Archived 22 May 2013 via Wayback); Disney Interactive
Games	Angry Birds Star Wars (Archived 5 May 2013 via Wayback); Luxus		Animal Jam (Archived 22 May 2013 via Wayback); Smart Bomb Interactive
Games	Angry Birds Star Wars (Archived 5 May 2013 via Wayback); Luxus		Atari Arcade (Archived 20 May 2013 via Wayback); Microsoft
Games	Angry Birds Star Wars (Archived 5 May 2013 via Wayback); Luxus		Contre Jour (Archived 18 May 2013 via Wayback); Mokus Games, Microsoft, Clarity Consulting, Pixel Lab
Games-Related	GameSpot (Archived 22 May 2013 via Wayback); CBS Interactive	Twitch (Archived 22 May 2013 via Wayback); Twitch	Polygon (Archived 22 May 2013 via Wayback); Vox Media
Games-Related	GameSpot (Archived 22 May 2013 via Wayback); CBS Interactive	Twitch (Archived 22 May 2013 via Wayback); Twitch	IGN.com (Archived 22 May 2013 via Wayback); IGN Entertainment
Games-Related	GameSpot (Archived 22 May 2013 via Wayback); CBS Interactive	Twitch (Archived 22 May 2013 via Wayback); Twitch	Just One More Game ... Angry Birds, Farmville and Other Hyperaddictive 'Stupid Games' (Archived 4 May 2013 via Wayback); The New York Times
Interactive Advertising & Media - Game or Application	Old Spice Dikembe Mutombo Saves the World (Archived 4 May 2013 via Wayback); Wieden+Kennedy		Unbaby.me (http://unbaby.me/voteforthisshityo/); Baker, Marquis, & Cheng, LLC
Interactive Advertising & Media - Game or Application	Old Spice Dikembe Mutombo Saves the World (Archived 4 May 2013 via Wayback); Wieden+Kennedy		Cube (Archived 29 May 2013 via Wayback); B-Reel
Interactive Advertising & Media - Game or Application	Old Spice Dikembe Mutombo Saves the World (Archived 4 May 2013 via Wayback); Wieden+Kennedy		UNIQLO - Lucky Cube With Maru (Archived 4 May 2013 via Wayback); Digitas
Interactive Advertising & Media - Game or Application	Old Spice Dikembe Mutombo Saves the World (Archived 4 May 2013 via Wayback); Wieden+Kennedy		The Parcel Memory (Archived 22 May 2013 via Wayback); Akestam Holst
Mobile & Apps - Games (Handheld Devices)	Draw A Stickman Epic (Archived 18 May 2013 via Wayback); Hitcents	Cut the Rope (Archived 15 May 2013 via Wayback); ZeptoLab	Puzzle Craft (Archived 11 May 2013 via Wayback); Ars Thanea Games
Mobile & Apps - Games (Handheld Devices)	Draw A Stickman Epic (Archived 18 May 2013 via Wayback); Hitcents	Cut the Rope (Archived 15 May 2013 via Wayback); ZeptoLab	Spy vs Spy (Archived 4 June 2013 via Wayback); Robots and Pencils Inc.
Mobile & Apps - Games (Handheld Devices)	Draw A Stickman Epic (Archived 18 May 2013 via Wayback); Hitcents	Cut the Rope (Archived 15 May 2013 via Wayback); ZeptoLab	Hotseat (Archived 14 May 2013 via Wayback); Mad*Pow
Mobile & Apps - Games (Tablet & All Other Devices)	ESPN Fantasy Football App (Archived 13 May 2013 via Wayback); ESPN	Draw A Stickman Epic (Archived 18 May 2013 via Wayback); Hitcents	Puzzle Craft (Archived 11 May 2013 via Wayback); Ars Thanea Games
Mobile & Apps - Games (Tablet & All Other Devices)	ESPN Fantasy Football App (Archived 13 May 2013 via Wayback); ESPN	Draw A Stickman Epic (Archived 18 May 2013 via Wayback); Hitcents	Oscura (Archived 25 May 2013 via Wayback); Viacom International Media Networks
Mobile & Apps - Games (Tablet & All Other Devices)	ESPN Fantasy Football App (Archived 13 May 2013 via Wayback); ESPN	Draw A Stickman Epic (Archived 18 May 2013 via Wayback); Hitcents	Cyberchase 3D Builder (Archived 4 May 2013 via Wayback); THIRTEEN
This table is incomplete, please help to complete it from material on this page.
