= Charisma Christian Church =

- Location: Le Blanc Mesnil
- Country: France
- Denomination: Evangelicalism, charismatic
- Website: www.charisma.fr/

History
- Founded: 1989
- Founder: Nuno Pedro

Charisma Christian Church is a charismatic evangelical church located in Le Blanc-Mesnil, Île-de-France.

== History ==
It was established in 1989 by the Portuguese pastor Nuno Pedro, a former member of Assemblies of God. This church is composed of Christians from all over the Paris region, many of whom are originally from the Antilles and from Africa. The church has grown regularly, 300 new people visit its services each month. It aims to "Lead people to faith in Jesus Christ" and speaks of "prosperity, triumph and success" as the will of God for the faithful. Since 2002, several affiliated churches are established in various cities of France.

In 2012, the church had 4,000 people in Paris, and 3,000 in France, for a total of 7,000.

== See also ==
- List of the largest evangelical churches
- List of the largest evangelical church auditoriums
