= Karishma Naina Sharma =

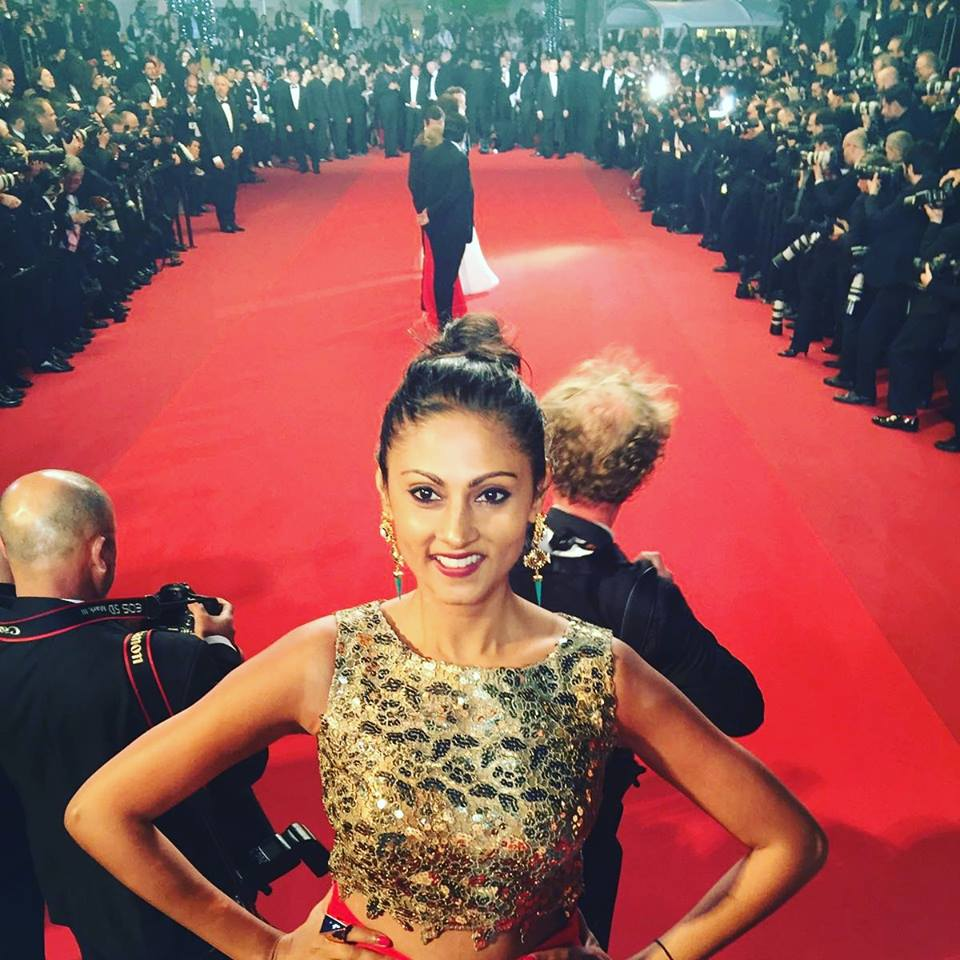
- Karishma Naina Sharma at Cannes 2016
- Born: Karishma Naina Sharma; Fiji Islands
- Occupations: Film producer, writer, television presenter, model
- Years active: 2000-present

Karishma Naina Sharma, better known as the Karishma, is a film production executive. She was the VP and development head of Balaji Motion Pictures, and then became head of international television for International Art Machine. Before that, she was an anchor for the show I Love Style.
