= Cut the Rope: Time Travel =

2013 video game

- Logo
- Developer: ZeptoLab
- Publisher: ZeptoLab
- Series: Cut the Rope
- Platforms: iOS; Android; Browser
- Release: iOS, Android; April 18, 2013; Browser; June 22, 2015
- Genre: Puzzle
- Mode: Single-player

Cut the Rope: Time Travel is a physics-based puzzle video game developed by ZeptoLab for iOS, Android and web browsers. The third entry in the Cut the Rope series, it follows Om Nom going through time.

== Gameplay ==
Time Travel shares the main idea with the previous games in the series, where the players must cut the ropes with swipes in order for Om Nom to get the candy. However, the game adds Om Nom's ancestors (or descendant in the future levels), which means there are now two candies for two creatures in each level. That leads to the puzzles where the players will have to plan to feed both creatures at the same time.

With each collected piece of candy, the players will gain stars that are equivalent to points; the more stars obtained in a certain level, the more bonus points are earned for other features like super powers, used as a help during the puzzles. By pressing the camera button, the players can view animated stories created by ZeptoLab, offering more info about Om Nom's ancestry.

Centered around time travel, the game consists of various time periods, from the Middle Ages to the Stone Age. Each one of them regularly add new obstacles and mechanisms to be used. Some of those are: the chains can hold up candies requiring to be cut by a blade, freeze button that stops any movement on the screen, bombs that will send everything in its radius up, and others.

== Reception ==
Reception

Aggregate score
Aggregator	Score
Metacritic	84/100

Review scores
Publication	Score
Game Informer	8.5/10
Gamezebo	4.5/5
Pocket Gamer	4/5
TouchArcade	4.5/5

On its release, Cut the Rope: Time Travel was met with "generally favorable" reviews from critics, with an aggregate score of 84/100 on Metacritic.
