= Chetana College =

College in Maharashtra, India

Coordinates: 19.02228°N 72.85618°E

Chetna’s Hazarimal Somani College of Commerce & Economics, and Smt. Kusumtai Chaudhari College of Arts
- Survey No.341; Government Colony; P.O. Bandra (East); Mumbai 400 051; Maharashtra; India

Information
- Type: Junior, Degree College & PG College
- Established: 16 June 1970
- Campus: Urban
- Affiliations: University of Mumbai
- Website: www.chetanacollege.in

Chetna’s Hazarimal Somani College of Commerce & Economics, Smt. Kusumtai Chaudhari College of Arts, commonly known as Chetana College, is a college located in Bandra, Mumbai, India. It is affiliated to the University of Mumbai. It is the second oldest business school in Mumbai. It is recognized by the University Grants Commission (India) and accredited by National Assessment and Accreditation Council (NAAC) with "A" Grade.

== See also ==
- List of colleges in Mumbai
