= Parachute Ninja =

2010 video game

- App icon
- Developer: Freeverse Inc.
- Publisher: ZeptoLab
- Platform: iOS
- Release: January 28, 2010
- Genre: Action
- Mode: Single-player

Parachute Ninja is a 2010 action game developed by ZeptoLab and published by the American studio Freeverse Inc.. It was released on January 28, 2010.

== Reception ==
The game has a "generally favorable" Metacritic rating of 89 based on six critics.

The game was well received.
