= Brandon Stanton =

American photographer and artist (born 1984)

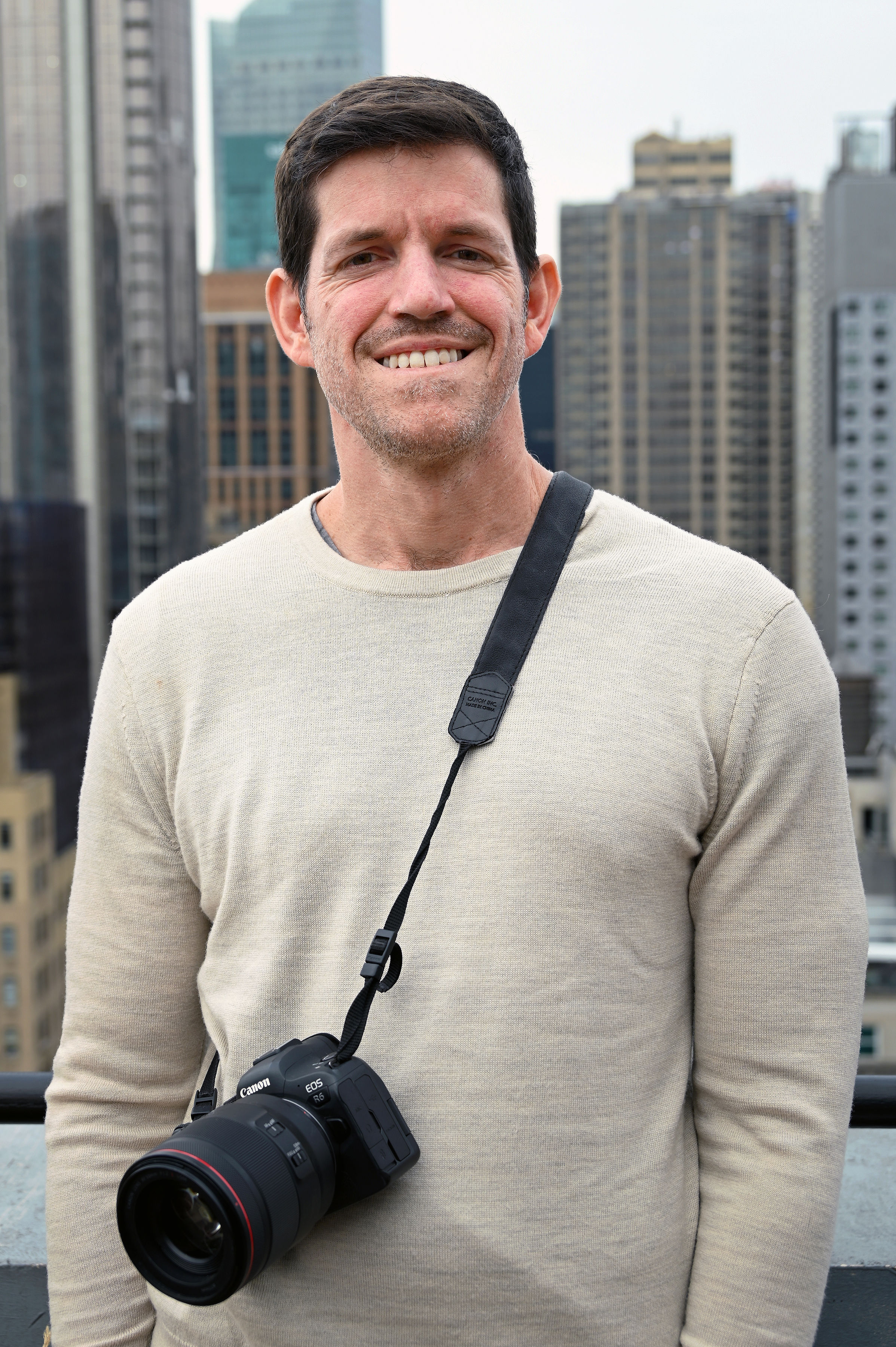
- Stanton in 2025
- Born: March 1, 1984 (age 42); Marietta, Georgia, U.S.
- Education: University of Georgia
- Occupations: Author, photographer, artist
- Known for: Humans of New York; Dear New York
- Website: brandonstanton.com

Brandon Stanton (born March 1, 1984) is an American author, photographer, and artist. He is the founder of Humans of New York (HONY), an online storytelling platform and collection of books. He is also the creator of Dear New York, a two-week immersive art installation in New York City's Grand Central Terminal.

Since 2010, Stanton has taken thousands of portraits of people living and working primarily in New York City, accompanied by bits of conversations about their lives. He has also traveled outside of the United States, capturing people and their lives in more than 40 countries, including Iran, Iraq, Uganda, Democratic Republic of the Congo, Ukraine, Vietnam, and Mexico.

== Life and work ==
Stanton grew up in Marietta, Georgia, a suburb of Atlanta, where he completed his secondary schooling at The Walker School in 2002. He majored in history at the University of Georgia. In 2010, he bought a camera while working as a bond trader in Chicago, and started taking photographs in downtown Chicago on the weekends. When he lost his job a short time later, he decided to pursue photography full-time. Moving to New York City, he set out to photograph 10,000 New Yorkers and plot their portraits on a map of the city, surviving on unemployment checks to "almost pay rent" and borrowing money from friends and family. Eventually, he moved his photographs to the Humans of New York Facebook page, which he started in November 2010. After posting a photo of a woman including a quote from her, he soon began adding captions and quotes to his photographs, which eventually evolved into full interviews.

His Humans of New York book was published in October 2013. It received positive reviews and sold 30,000 copies as preorders. The book reached the number 1 position on The New York Times Non-Fiction Best Sellers of 2013 for the week beginning November 3, 2013. The book remained on the list for 26 weeks, again reaching the number one position on December 21, 2014.

Stanton visits President Barack Obama at the White House on February 5, 2015

In December 2013, Stanton was named one of Time magazine's "30 Under 30 People Changing the World". In August 2014, he traveled to the Middle East to photograph people as part of a 50-day trip through 10 countries in the region under the auspices of the United Nations. In July 2015, he traveled to Pakistan and again to Iran to do the same. At the conclusion of his trip to Pakistan, Stanton crowdfunded $2.3 million to help end bonded labor in Pakistan.

In January 2015, Stanton was invited to the Oval Office to interview President Barack Obama. The trip concluded a two-week crowdfunding campaign on Humans of New York in which $1.4 million was raised.

In March 2016, Stanton opposed Donald Trump's presidential campaign, criticizing Trump on social media for hateful speech, such as delayed disavowing "white supremacy" and defending those who commit violence at his rallies. A day after his Facebook post, it had over 1.6 million likes and was shared nearly 1 million times.

Stanton has posted stories and photos from the Pediatrics Department of Memorial Sloan Kettering Cancer Center in New York City. As he did for his other projects, Stanton created a fundraising campaign, and raised over $3.8 million for pediatric cancer research.

In 2020, Stanton released Humans, a book of portraits and stories from forty countries around the world. It debuted at number 1 on the NYT Bestsellers’ list in non-fiction category.

In 2022, Stanton published the first longform piece of writing based on one of his subjects: Tanqueray. The Washington Post described it as, “A beautiful, sometimes shocking NC-17 story, kept out of the lily-white, upper crust canon of literature―until now.”

== Dear New York ==
In October 2025, Stanton transformed New York City's Grand Central Terminal into an immersive public art installation titled Dear New York, which ran from October 6 to 19. All commercial advertising within the terminal was removed for the two-week run and replaced with photographic portraits and stories drawn from Humans of New York. The installation featured 50-foot projections in the Main Concourse, over 100 hours of live performances by Juilliard students and faculty, and a community exhibition in Vanderbilt Hall with work by 600 New York City public school students. Stanton said the installation was conceived as an attempt to "recreate the humanity of New York City in a single building." ARTnews described the project as "a citywide self-portrait" and compared its scale and civic ambition to Christo and Jeanne-Claude's 2005 installation The Gates. Stanton self-funded the project, which he described as costing most of the savings he had accumulated over 15 years of Humans of New York. A companion book of the same title was published alongside the installation.

== Publications ==
- Humans of New York. New York: St. Martin's Press. 2013. ISBN 978-1-250-03882-1.
- Little Humans of New York. New York: Farrar, Straus and Giroux. 2014. ISBN 978-0374374563.
- Humans of New York: Stories. New York: St. Martin's Press. 2015. ISBN 978-1250058904.
- Humans. New York: St. Martin's Press. 2020. ISBN 978-1-250-11429-7.
- with Johnson, Stephanie (2022). Tanqueray. New York: St. Martin's Press. ISBN 978-1-250-27827-2.
- Dear New York. 2025. ISBN 978-1-250-27758-9.

== Awards ==
- 2013: People's Voice award, Best Use of Photography category, 2013 Webby Award for Humans of New York.
- 2013: Time magazine placed him in its list of "30 Under 30 World Changers".
- 2014: James Joyce Award from the Literary and Historical Society (L&H) of University College Dublin (UCD).
- 2021: Clio Award for Storytelling.
