= Cut the Rope =

Video game franchise

- Logo since 2010
- Genre: Puzzle
- Developers: ZeptoLab; Paladin Studios
- Publisher: ZeptoLab (Note: Chillingo published the original version. Activision published various console versions. Netflix published Cut the Rope Daily. Paladin Studios published the remaster.)
- Platforms: iOS; Android; Windows Phone; Leap Motion; BlackBerry 10; Symbian; BlackBerry PlayBook; Nintendo DS (DSiWare); Mac OS X; Browser; Windows; BlackBerry; Nintendo 3DS (Nintendo eShop); ChromeOS; Firefox OS; Nook
- First release: Cut the Rope; October 4, 2010
- Latest release: Cut the Rope 3 October 13, 2023

Cut the Rope is a media franchise and series of puzzle video games developed and published by ZeptoLab. It consists of the original game Cut the Rope (2010), Cut the Rope: Holiday Gift (2010), Cut the Rope: Experiments (2011), Cut the Rope: Time Travel (2013), Cut the Rope 2 (2013 iOS; 2014 Android), My Om Nom (2014 iOS; 2015 Android), Cut the Rope: Magic (2015), Cut the Rope Remastered (2021), Cut the Rope: BLAST (2022), Cut the Rope Daily (2023), and Cut the Rope 3 (2023).

The objective of the Cut the Rope games is to feed candy to a little green creature named Om Nom while collecting stars. As of May 2015, Cut the Rope games have been downloaded more than 600 million times and had surpassed over a billion downloads by 2018.

== Games ==
Release timeline Main releases in bold
2010	**Cut the Rope**
2011	Cut the Rope: Experiments
2012
2013	Cut the Rope: Time Travel
2013	**Cut the Rope 2**
2014	Cut the Rope: Triple Treat
2014	My Om Nom
2015	Cut the Rope: Magic
2016
2017
2018
2019	Om Nom: Merge
2020	Om Nom: Run
2021	Cut the Rope Remastered
2022	Cut the Rope: BLAST
2023	Cut the Rope Daily
2023	**Cut the Rope 3**

=== Cut the Rope (2010) ===
Cut the Rope, the first game in the series, was released initially on October 4, 2010 and published by Chillingo. A native (HD) version for the iPad was released on October 6, 2010. This was followed by the release of a free version with fewer levels for each device, called Cut the Rope Free and Cut the Rope HD Free respectively.

=== Cut the Rope: Experiments (2011) ===
Cut the Rope: Experiments was released on August 4, 2011, as a sequel to Cut the Rope. While its gameplay and presentation closely match that of Cut the Rope, the sequel introduces new gameplay elements as well as a new storyline and characters. The Professor, for example, “provides running commentary” throughout the game as players unlock new levels and collect "hidden" photos that reveal more information about the little green creature's character.

=== Cut the Rope: Time Travel (2013) ===
The third sequel, Cut the Rope: Time Travel, was released on April 17, 2013. It sees Om Nom travel back to the time of his ancestors, which means in terms of gameplay that players now feed candy to two monsters rather than to only one.

=== Cut the Rope 2 (2013) ===
Cut the Rope 2 was released on December 19, 2013, for iOS devices. It expands on the previous games with Om Nom no longer being a static stage object, additional creature characters and a more dynamic environment. There are many of these characters, such as Blue, Toss, Lick, Boo, and Roto. The Android version was released on March 28, 2014, on Google Play and on April 3 on Amazon AppStore. Unlike the iOS version, Cut the Rope 2 for Android adds free-to-play elements such as an energy system, and features a map like structure instead of level packs; these features would eventually be added to the iOS version of the game.

=== Cut the Rope: Triple Treat (2014) ===
Cut the Rope: Triple Treat was released on March 25, 2014, for Nintendo 3DS, including levels from the three previous Cut the Rope games, Cut the Rope, Cut the Rope: Experiments and Cut the Rope: Time Travel. It was published by Activision.

=== My Om Nom (2014) ===
My Om Nom was released on December 18, 2014, for iOS devices and 2015 for Android devices. In this game, the player has their own Om Nom to feed, dress up, and play with. It includes some simple games to play with Om Nom, and it is reminiscent of the Tamagotchi franchise and similar to Pou.

=== Cut the Rope: Magic (2015) ===
Cut the Rope: Magic was released on December 17, 2015, for both iOS and Android devices. This game sees Om Nom being transported to a storybook world where the levels involve magical elements as well as battling an equally candy-loving spider wizard. Magic added a new transformation element to Om Nom, allowing him to shrink or turn into a completely different animal. The game also uses a map element seen in the Android version and later versions of the iOS version of Cut the Rope 2. While the iOS version was exclusively paid, the Android version is free-to-play, and thus, added an energy system that could be removed with a one-time micropayment, which was later replaced with a paid subscription. A free version was eventually added to iOS but did not carry the energy system from the Android release.

=== Om Nom: Merge (2019) ===
Om Nom: Merge was released on November 28, 2019, and is the first video game entry in the franchise in four years, due to the success of Om Nom Stories.

=== Om Nom: Run (2020) ===
Om Nom: Run is a free-to-play endless runner mobile game, released on February 27, 2020. It is available on Android, iOS platforms and the Nintendo Switch. The game follows Om Nom running through the dangerous streets of the city. The game starts by tapping the touchscreen, while Om Nom (the game's starter character) or any other character exits the base, and then starts running through the streets of the city.

The game has multiple gameplay modes. The main mode, called Free Run, is a traditional endless runner game. The mission mode gives players tasks to complete as they run. This mode ends when the player crashes or completes the mission objectives.

The initial release has been a success. In a span of one month, it has been downloaded for over 5 million times.

=== Cut the Rope Remastered (2021) ===
A remastered version of Cut the Rope was released on April 2, 2021 on Apple Arcade by Paladin Studios. In the game, Om Nom and his family celebrate his birthday; on this special occasion, Nibble Nom takes out a few books as birthday presents, which are based on the events on the previous games in the series. In the game, there are five level packs, this time presented as books, with levels either taken from or are based on five of the previous entries: Evan's House, based on the original, Experiments and Time Travel, both based on the games of the same name, Road Trip, based on Cut the Rope 2 and Magic (based on the game of the same name). New to the series are levels containing Nibble Nom instead of Om Nom; the player has to guide three candies to the tiny creature instead of one, and Nibble Nom himself can be pushed about and interact with other objects, while Om Nom remains stationary in levels until Road Trip. Another new feature is bonus levels containing Om Nelle (released in a post-launch update); the player has to give her the candy with the box filled with water. Remastered also features new 3D graphics, an interactive map where power-ups (magnets, candy rain and teleporter) and "worldstars", which are added to certain levels for replay value, can be found, and an account system, where up to six saves can be used. The game shut down in early 2024 and was removed from the App Store in 2026. In September 2026, the app made a comeback on iOS and Android, set for release on December 3, 2026.

=== Cut the Rope Daily (2023) ===
Cut the Rope Daily was released exclusively through Netflix Games on August 1, 2023. The game offers a single unique level every day, the same for the whole world. The challenge is to deliver the candy to Om Nom while collecting as many stars as possible (there are 10 in each level). The scoring is based on the number of collected stars and the number of tries. Results are shareable on social media. The progress and winstreak can be tracked in the in-game calendar, and each month has a separate theme with a themed costume for Om Nom to be won with winstreak.

=== Cut the Rope 3 (2023) ===
Cut the Rope 3 was released on October 13, 2023 on Apple Arcade. It focuses on Om Nom and his son, Nibble Nom setting out on a journey to discover new creatures. The gameplay replaces pieces of candy with Nibble Nom, who must reach Om Nom's location in each level. The game features several different locations, with the location that the player explores being selected by Om Nom's compass. In each search for a creature, the player will go through three random levels in order to discover and take a picture of one. It is also the second main Cut the Rope title to feature 3D graphics after Cut the Rope Remastered. On February 2, 2024, augmented reality features became accessible to support the release of the Apple Vision Pro. Cut the Rope 3 was the final game to be developed by Paladin Studios before its closure.

== Reception ==
In addition to its commercial success, Cut the Rope was very well received by critics. It has a score of 93 on Metacritic, indicating "universal acclaim".

Cut the Rope: Experiments reached an aggregate Metacritic score of 85 out of 100, Cut the Rope: Time Travel — a score of 84, and Cut the Rope 2 a score of 81.

== Adaptations, spin-offs and merchandise ==
Om Nom Stories, an animated web series on ZeptoLab's YouTube channel and several kid-oriented streaming sites, is based on the game series and revolves around Om Nom's life out of the game.

In July 2011, ZeptoLab and comics publisher Ape Entertainment published a comic book series to be published as a stand-alone app. The comics tell the backstory of the candy-eating monster Om Nom and introduce new characters.

The character Om Nom has become the subject of a viral video, plush toys, and a Mattel Apptivity game.

In August 2014, ZeptoLab and McDonald's Europe announced a multi-market Happy Meal promotional campaign, which featured various Cut the Rope-themed kitchen accessories, such as banana splitter and juicer. "Hungry for fruit and fun?" was the key message of the campaign. As part of the promotion, ZeptoLab also released the game called Cut the Rope: Hungry for Fruit.

In June 2015, Zeptolab partnered with Blockade Entertainment for a feature film based on the mobile game, a film titled Om Nom: The Movie, that was set for release in 2016, but it never came to fruition. Starting in 2023, the Cut the Rope X account repeatedly hinted at another film adaptation there are no confirmation announcements yet.

In March 2021, ZeptoLab created a personalized book for children in collaboration with LionStory. The book features Om Nom, Om Nelle, Toss, Snail Brow, Roto, Lick, Ginger, Blue and a personalized character of a child (appearance, name, dedication and a back cover photo).

== See also ==
- List of most downloaded Android applications
