= Personalized book =

A personalized book is a book that is created specifically for someone, containing personalized text, customized illustrations, or variables, based on the characteristics of that person. Although most personalized book companies provide hard copy physical books only, there are a few companies who also offer some or all of their titles as ebooks.

== Types of personalization ==
The purchaser can typically customize aspects of the text of the book, such as the hero's name, or aspects of the story. Other variables that may be possible to change include illustrations and photos.
