= Cut the Rope: Experiments =

2011 video game

- Developer: ZeptoLab
- Publisher: ZeptoLab
- Series: Cut the Rope
- Platforms: iOS; Android; BlackBerry; Nintendo 3DS
- Release: August 4, 2011: iOS; August 4, 2011; Amazon; March 15, 2012; Android; March 18, 2012; BlackBerry; July 2013; 3DS; March 28, 2014
- Genre: Puzzle
- Mode: Single-player

Cut the Rope: Experiments is a physics-based puzzle video game developed and published by ZeptoLab. The second entry in the Cut the Rope series, the game follows Om Nom encountering tools such as bubbles, air cushions, suction cups, etc. The game was originally released for iOS in August 2011 and Android in March 2012. It was once the Amazon Appstore's free app of the day on May 24, 2013, but was delisted a day after.

== Gameplay ==
The game is divided into several level packs. As of December 2013, there are 8 packs, each consisting of 25 levels. (Note: The original free version of the app featured 7 level packs and 175 levels.)

The story starts from an animated short showing a box with Om Nom getting to the Professor. He helps Om Nom pass a series of experiments, often commenting on his success or encouraging the player to try more.

== Critical reception ==
Reception

Aggregate score
Aggregator	Score
Metacritic	85/100

Review scores
Publication	Score
Eurogamer	7/10
Gamezebo	4/5
IGN	9/10
Pocket Gamer	4/5
TouchArcade	4/5
VideoGamer.com	8/10

Cut the Rope: Experiments received mainly positive reviews from critics. According to the review aggregator Metacritic, Cut the Rope: Experiments received "generally favorable reviews" based on a weighted average score of 85 out of 100 from 16 critic scores.

Carter Dotson of 148Apps said, "Still quite fun, but it isn't entirely fresh. Those looking for new levels with new concepts that explore the familiar formula will enjoy this. Those tired of the game won't find much here to appeal to them." Alex Seiver of AppSafari called the game "a cute casual game that packs a great deal of strategy and fun into a tiny package." Kevin of AppSmile said, "Featuring a couple of intriguing new gameplay elements and the same terrific presentation that has spawned a slew of GUI look-alikes, Cut the Rope: Experiments delivers another solid set of levels to challenge fans of the cute green monster." Andrew Nesvadba of AppSpy said, "Cut the Rope: Experiments is not so much as sequel as it is a separate expansion to the game's world - this gives ZeptoLab some room to breathe and experiment with new ideas (as you'd expect from the title), giving it some great potential, but for now it's a fun addition to a game you probably already enjoy."

Justin Davis of IGN said that the game "follows the exact same formula as its predecessor, which means it's awesome." Damon Brown of Pocket Gamer said that the game "takes the original's addictive formula and adds a splash of deviousness, thanks to the addition of some cunning new items." Rick Broida of CNET said that the game features "more of the adorable Om Nom, who has the best name of any game character ever."
