= ZeptoLab =

Multinational video game company

- Current studio logo since 2022
- Type: Private
- Industry: Video games
- Founded: 2010; 16 years ago in Moscow, Russia
- Founders: Semyon Voinov; Efim Voinov
- Headquarters: London, United Kingdom
- Key people: Efim Voinov (CEO)
- Divisions: ZeptoLab Publishing
- Website: zeptolab.com

ZeptoLab (stylised in all lowercase) is a European video game developer founded in 2010 by Semyon and Efim Voinov, and based in London. It is known for the Cut the Rope series of video games.

== History ==
ZeptoLab was founded in 2010 by twins Efim and Semyon Voinov, who have been making games since the age of ten. Its name originates from “Zepto”, a math prefix meaning 10^{−21}, to “signify how truly boutique their operation was.”

In 2011, ZeptoLab UK Limited was incorporated in London. The company has not received any external funding to produce their games. A publishing division was started in 2017. ZeptoLab started a new game development subsidiary in Barcelona in 2015.

In January 2025, Nazara Technologies acquired the intellectual property of CATS: Crash Arena Turbo Stars and King of Thieves for Rs 660,000,000. The games will be published under Nazara Publishing.

== List of games released ==
- Parachute Ninja (January 28, 2010)
- Cut the Rope (October 4, 2010)
- Cut the Rope: Holiday Gift (December 1, 2010)
- Cut the Rope: Experiments (August 23, 2011)
- Pudding Monsters (December 19, 2012 on iOS / December 21, 2012 on Android / February 25, 2022 on Nintendo Switch)
- Cut the Rope: Time Travel (April 18, 2013)
- Cut the Rope 2 (December 19, 2013 on iOS / March 28, 2014 on Android)
- King of Thieves (February 12, 2015 on App Store (iOS/iPadOS) / February 26, 2015 on Amazon Appstore / March 5, 2015 on Google Play).
- My Om Nom (December 18, 2014 on iOS / Android (August 17, 2015) (in cooperation with Dynamic Pixels).
- Cut the Rope: Magic (December 17, 2015)
- Om Nom Bubbles (December 18, 2015 / August 30, 2021 on Android devices)
- C.A.T.S - Crash Arena Turbo Stars (April 20, 2017)
- Om Nom Maya Papaya (January 22, 2018)
- Where's Om Nom (March 11, 2019)
- Om Nom: Merge (November 28, 2019) (in cooperation with Amuzo Games)
- Om Nom: Run (February 20, 2020) (in cooperation with Koukoi Games Oy)
- Bullet Echo (May 27, 2020)
- Robotics! (August 5, 2020)
- Evo Pop (November 11, 2020)
- Cut the Rope Remastered (April 2, 2021 on Apple Arcade) (Developed and published by Paladin Studios)
- Downhill Smash (November 30, 2021 on Android / December 1, 2021 on iOS) (in cooperation with Hipster Whale)
- Overcrowded: Tycoon (April 26, 2022 on Android / March 3, 2022 on iOS)
- Cut the Rope Daily (August 1, 2023 on iOS and Android for Netflix Games)
- Cut the Rope 3 (October 13, 2023 on Apple Arcade and February 2, 2024 on Apple Vision Pro) (Developed by Paladin Studios)
