= Photoblog =

Blog focussing on or consisting of photography

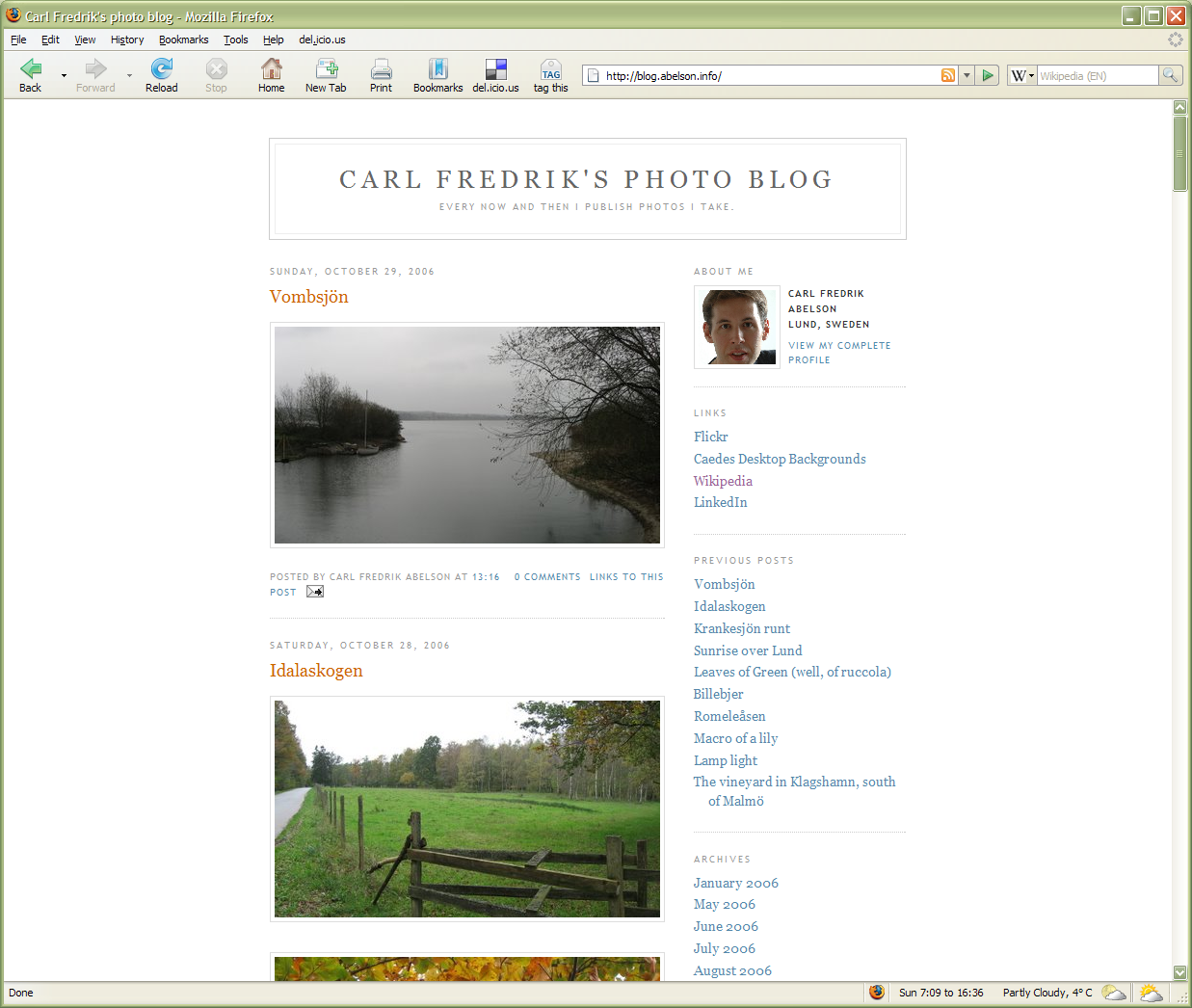
Screenshot of a typical photo blog

A photoblog (or photolog) is a form of photo sharing and publishing in the format of a blog. It differs from a blog through the predominant use of and focus on photographs rather than text. Photoblogging (the action of posting photos to a photoblog) gained momentum in the early 2000s with the advent of the moblog and cameraphones.

== Construction ==
There are three popular ways to host a photoblog. Photoblogs on individual domains, photoblogs on blogging hosting services such as WordPress or Blogger, and photoblogs on photo specific blogging services such as Fotolog or Flickr.

The dynamic nature of blogs, including photoblogs compared to static sites means that blogs require some form of content management system (CMS) rather than being built mostly by hand. These content management systems usually provide the photoblog's authors with a web service that allows the creation and management of posts and the uploading of images. The CMS delivers webpages based on the data entered by the photoblog author. Access to photoblogs is usually unrestricted and available to anyone with internet access and a web browser.

Some existing blogging CMS have been modified by the use of add-ons or plugins (and sometimes core code rewriting) to enable the transition from text blogging to photoblogging. As an example, a photoblog author might limit his blog to display a single entry per day (as opposed to several entries which is typical for text blogs) and he might put thumbnails in entry excerpts to provide archives that display images instead of text snippets. Over time, developers have begun to write purpose-built CMS just for creating photoblogs. Additionally, many services specializing in hosting and displaying images, such as Flickr and Fotolog, have APIs that allow other blogging systems to display their images, giving the user many options as to the construction of a particular site. Good photoblogging platforms also include camera metadata (Exif) that display the camera settings of each photo taken.

== Developments and accessibility ==
The early days of photoblogging required some level of technical experience with setting up a webserver and installing or writing the CMS code for it (e.g. Pixelpost or Picoplog). Some photobloggers still prefer this option of running their own server, as this gives them full control over the display and functionality of their photoblog. However, there are now a range of photoblog hosting services available which provide a ready-made solution in which everything has already been set up. This has made photoblogging more accessible to the layman.

Convergence of mobile phones with digital cameras has opened a new era in photoblogging as authors may publish photos directly from smart devices to the Web. Visual blogging enables people with limited English, or low literacy to contribute to material on the Web. Combined with automatic (photo-booth) uploading technology, this is a powerful tool to build digital literacy and digital citizenship in marginalized groups.

== See also ==
- Blog software
- Content management system
- Image hosting service
- Mobile blogging
- Photo sharing
