= 100 Million Campaign =

The 100 Million Campaign is an international non-governmental organization working to eradicate child labor, end violence against children, and ensure universal access to education. Founded in 2016 with the support of Nobel Peace Laureate Kailash Satyarthi, the campaign was inaugurated by 6,000 youth activists at the Presidential Palace in New Delhi, India.

== History ==
In 1998, young people participated in the Global march against child labor led by Indian Nobel Peace Laureate Kailash Satyarthi, contributing to the International Labour Organization's adoption of the Convention on the Worst Forms of Child Labor, and the foundation of the Global Campaign for Education in 1999. In 2016, at Rashtrapati Bhavan, Satyarthi, President Pranab Mukherjee, and 6,000 youth activists inaugurated the 100 Million Campaign to build on the Global march against child labor and the Global Campaign for Education. In 2017, Saber Hossain Chowdhury, Speaker of the Parliament of Bangladesh, welcomed the campaign at the 136th Inter-Parliamentary Union in Dhaka, Bangladesh.

In 2017, Jiko Luveni, Speaker of the Parliament of the Republic of Fiji, launched the campaign at the Government Buildings, Suva. In March 2018, the All-Africa Students Union launched the 100 Million Campaign in Africa at the Accra International Conference Centre. In November 2018, the Education and Science Workers’ Union launched the 100 Million Campaign in Germany. Youth activists met with Gerd Müller, Federal Minister for Economic Cooperation and Development, as well as MPs from the parties represented at the German Parliament in Berlin.

Barbel Kofler, Federal Government Commissioner for Human Rights Policy and Humanitarian Assistance at the Federal Foreign Office, subsequently called for more binding regulations in global supply chain management; and Claudia Roth, Vice President of the Bundestag, supported the 100 Million Campaign's demands where all children are “free, safe, and educated.” Gyde Jensen, Chairman of the Bundestag's Committee on Human Rights and Humanitarian Aid, proposed a session in the Bundestag dedicated to the eradication of child labor. That month, Satyarthi met with German Chancellor Angela Merkel.

In 2020, the 100 Million Campaign hosted a youth leadership caucus on the sidelines of the 2020 High-Level Political Forum on Sustainable Development. Youth activists urged G20 countries to end child labor and ensure universal access to education for the most vulnerable children and youth worldwide, with support from the Zimbabwe National Students Union, Organising Bureau of European School Student Unions and European Students Union. In 2022, the 100 Million Campaign joined the student delegation to the seventy-seventh session of the United Nations General Assembly at United Nations Headquarters in New York City.

== Campaigns ==
=== End Child Labor ===
In 2019, the 100 Million Campaign launched its first report, 'Every Child, Every Community, commemorating the 30th anniversary of the Convention on the Rights of the Child, and announcing its first campaign, "End Child Labor." The campaign centered survivor-advocate testimonies collected by the Tanzania Coalition Against Child Labor, WoteSawa Domestic Workers Organization, Somero Uganda, and Malawi Youth Coalition for the Consolidation of Democracy.

Following the announcement, rallies were organized in Liberia, Chad, Burundi, Sierra Leone, Zimbabwe, Ghana, and Kenya, with the support of the Liberia National Students Union and All-Africa Students Union. In the United States, the youth-led Planning Committee organized a rally in Washington, D.C. on the campus of American University. The campaign resulted in the protests of over 70,000 young people across the continent of Africa.

=== Education in Emergencies ===
In 2020, the 100 Million Campaign campaigned to form and host the Education Cannot Wait youth constituency. Composed of 130 youth-led NGOs from 40 conflict-affected countries, the constituency is the only youth constituency to democratically influence high-level humanitarian programs and policy through the United Nations System.

In 2021, American human rights activist H.D. Wright became the first young person democratically elected to the governing body of a United Nations humanitarian fund, representing the constituency on the Executive Committee, chaired by the Foreign, Commonwealth and Development Office, and on the High-Level Steering Group chaired by former Prime Minister of the United kingdom and UN Special Envoy for Global Education Gordon Brown.

In 2023, Honduran-Norwegian student unionist Hector Ulloa and Ugandan student unionist Mutesi Hadijah were elected to the Executive Committee, co-chaired by the German Federal Ministry for Economic Cooperation and Development and Swiss Federal Department of Foreign Affairs, and High-Level Steering Group, chaired by former Prime Minister of the Netherlands and UN Special Coordinator for the Middle East Peace Process Sigrad Kaag, on behalf of the Global Student Forum.

=== Justice for Africa ===
In 2022, the 100 Million Campaign announced the campaign, "Justice for Africa." Dedicated to expanding access to education across the African continent and strengthening the role of the African Union in global governance, the campaign affirms the Charter of the United Nations, the Universal Declaration of Human Rights and the sustainable development goals. Co-convened with the All-Africa Students Union, the campaign gathered representatives from 70 youth-led NGOs and student unions at the national and regional level from Southern Africa, East Africa, West Africa, Central Africa, and North America.

The campaign expanded to include movements spread across forty countries on five continents, and resulted in the authorship of the report, 'Our Future, Our Voice.' Announced in September, 2022, in the run up to the 6th EU-AU Summit and UNGA, the report highlighted the need for the African Union to play a greater role in global governance. The event, 'Justice for Africa's Children,' was supported by former Prime Minister of the Netherlands Stefan Lofven, alongside Nobel Peace Laureate Leymah Gbowee.

== See also ==
- Global Campaign for Education
- Global march against child labor
