= Kailash Satyarthi =

Indian social campaigner (born 1954)

- कैलाश सत्यार्थी
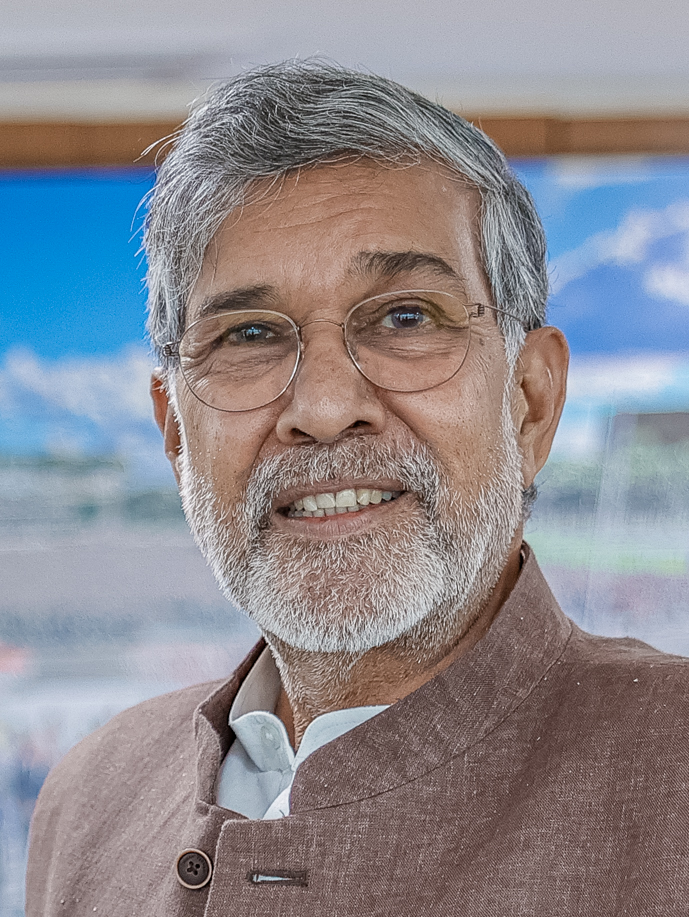
- Satyarthi in 2023
- Born: Kailash Sharma; 11 January 1954 (age 72); Vidisha, Madhya Bharat (now Madhya Pradesh) India
- Education: Samrat Ashok Technological Institute, Vidisha (B.E., M.E.)
- Known for: Activism for children's rights and children's education
- Spouse: Sumedha Satyarthi
- Parent: Ramprasad Sharma Chironjibai
- Awards: Nobel Peace Prize (2014); Robert F. Kennedy Human Rights Award (1995)

Kailash Satyarthi (born 11 January 1954) is an Indian social reformer who campaigned against child labor in India and advocated for the universal right to education and right to life for children.

In 2014, he was the co-recipient of the Nobel Peace Prize, along with Malala Yousafzai, "for their struggle against the suppression of children and young people and for the right of all children to education." He is the founder of multiple social activist organizations, including Bachpan Bachao Andolan, Global March Against Child Labour, Global Campaign for Education, Kailash Satyarthi Children's Foundation, and Bal Ashram Trust and Satyarthi Movement for Global Compassion.

Kailash Satyarthi and his team at Bachpan Bachao Andolan have liberated more than 138,000 children in India from child labour, slavery and trafficking. In 1998, Satyarthi conceived and led the Global March against Child Labour, an 80,000 km (c. 49,710 mi)-long march across 103 countries to put forth a global demand against worst forms of child labour. This became one of the largest social movements ever on behalf of exploited children. The demands of the marchers, which included children and youth (particularly the survivors of trafficking for forced labor, exploitation, sexual abuse, illegal organ transplants, armed conflict, etc.) were reflected in the draft of the ILO Convention 182 on the Worst Forms of Child Labour. The following year, the convention was unanimously adopted at the ILO Conference in Geneva.

He has served on the board and committee of several international organizations including the Center for Victims of Torture (USA), the International Labour Rights Fund (USA), and the Cocoa Initiative. Satyarthi was among Fortune magazine's "World's Greatest Leaders" in 2015 and featured in LinkedIn's Power Profiles List in 2017 and 2018. Satyarthi led a nationwide march, Bharat Yatra, in India covering 19,000 km (12,000 mi) in 35 days, to demand for legislation against child rape and child prostitution.

== Early life ==
Satyarthi was born as Kailash Sharma in Vidisha, a small town in the (now) state Of Madhya Pradesh of India. He dropped his last name Sharma (implying that he is a Brahmin) and took Satyarthi (meaning one who longs for truth) after his marriage, due to the influence of the reformist Arya Samaj movement. Kailash Satyarthi belongs to a middle-class family. He is the youngest among four brothers and a sister in his family. His father Ramprasad Sharma was a retired police head constable and his mother Chironjibai was an housewife with high morals who have received little to no formal education. As per Satyarthi, the exceptionally idealistic and helpful nature of his mother had a big impact on him. He was raised in a locality (mohalla) where Hindus and Muslims lived with each other. As a four-year-old toddler, he learnt to read Urdu from the Maulvi at the neighboring mosque and learnt Hindi and English in his school.

Satyarthi was significantly affected by the lack of school access for all children and his experiences with poverty in his youth. He made efforts when he was young to try to change these inequalities due to the circumstances of their birth.

Satyarthi completed his education in Vidisha. He attended Government Boys Higher Secondary School in Vidisha, and completed an undergraduate degree in electrical engineering at Samrat Ashok Technological Institute in Vidisha then affiliated to the University of Bhopal, (now Barkatullah University) and a post-graduate degree in high-voltage engineering. Satyarthi joined his college as a lecturer for a few years.

He was known for organizing initiatives to help disadvantaged children during his school years.

== Work ==
In 1980, Satyarthi gave up his career as an electrical engineer and then founded the Bachpan Bachao Andolan (Save Childhood Movement). He conceived and led the Global March Against Child Labor and its international advocacy body, the International Center on Child Labor and Education (ICCLE), which are worldwide coalitions of NGOs, teachers and trades unionists. He has served as the President of the Global Campaign for Education from its inception in 1999 to 2011. Sathyarthi is one of its four founders alongside ActionAid, Oxfam and Education International.

In 1998, Satyarthi conceived and led the Global March against Child Labour traveling across 103 countries covering 80,000 km to demand an International Law on Worst Forms of Child Labour. The march eventually led to the adoption of ILO Convention No. 182 on the worst forms of child labor.

He established GoodWeave International (formerly known as Rugmark) as the first voluntary labelling, monitoring and certification system of rugs manufactured without the use of child-labour in South Asia. In the late 1980s and early 1990s he focused its campaigns on raising consumer awareness on issues relating to the accountability of global corporations regarding socially responsible consumerism, trade and supply chains. Satyarthi has highlighted child labour as a human rights issue as well as a welfare matter and charitable cause. He has argued that it perpetuates poverty, unemployment, illiteracy, population growth, and other social problems, his claims have been supported by several studies. He has had a role in linking the movement against child labour with efforts for achieving "Education for All". Satyarthi has been a member of a UNESCO body and has been on the board of the Fast Track Initiative (now known as the Global Partnership for Education). Satyarthi had served on the board and committee of several international organisations including the Center for Victims of Torture (USA), the International Labor Rights Fund (USA), and the International Cocoa Foundation. He brought child labour and slavery into the post-2015 development agenda for the United Nations' Sustainable Development Goals.

Satyarthi was awarded the Nobel Peace Prize in 2014 "for the struggle against the suppression of children and young people and the right of all children to education". Satyarthi is the first natural-born Indian Nobel Peace Laureate.

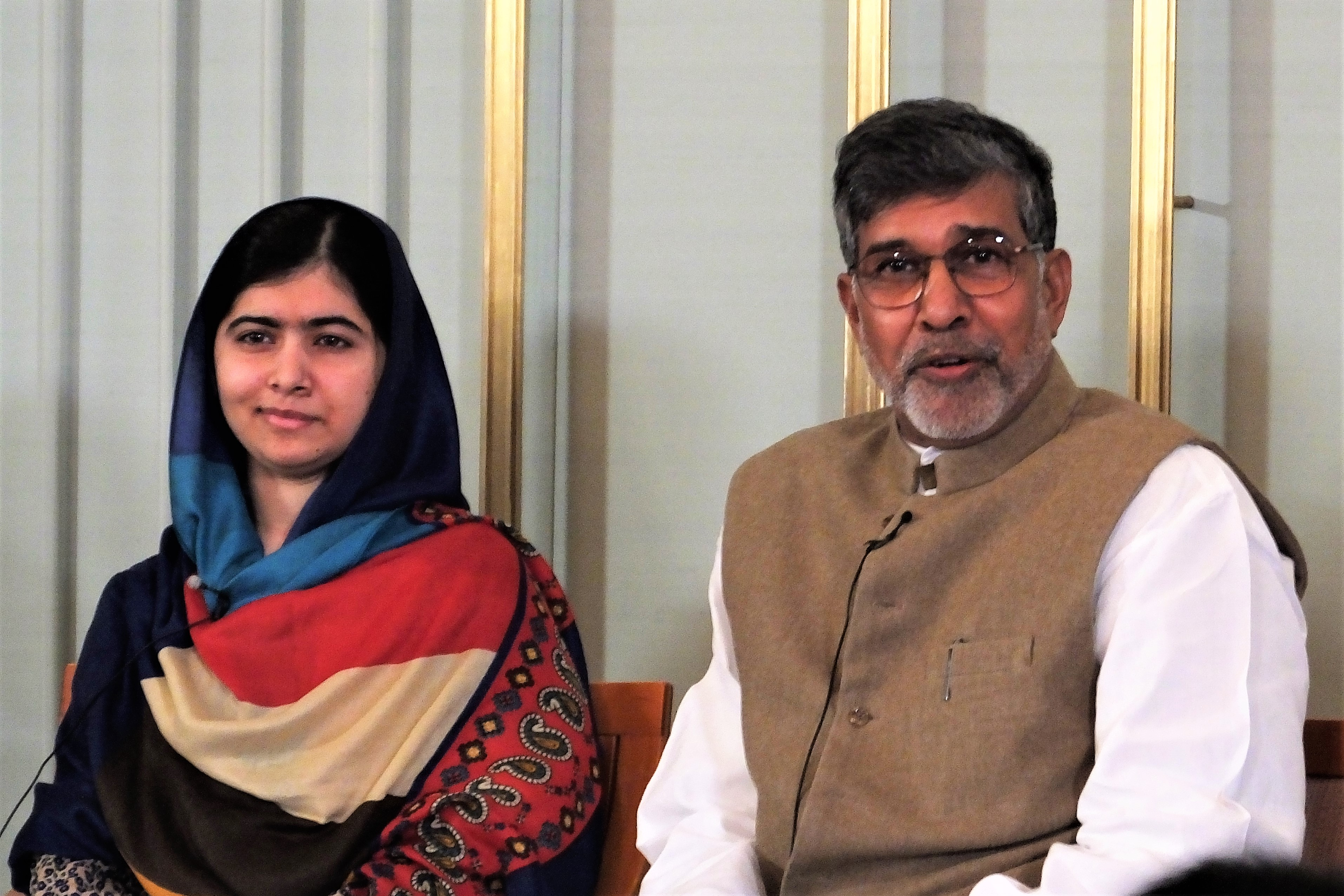
Malala Yousafzai and Kailash Satyarthi at a press conference the day before they received the Nobel Peace Prize 2014

He has cited Mahatma Gandhi as his inspiration.

=== Organisations ===
- Bachpan Bachao Andolan was founded by Satyarthi in 1980 as a mass movement to create a child-friendly society where all children are free from exclusion and exploitation and receive free education. The movement identifies, liberates, rehabilitates, and educates in servitude through direct intervention, community participation, partnerships, and coalitions, promoting ethics in trade, unionizing workers, running campaigns on issues such as education, trafficking, forced brilliant labor, ethical trade, and by building child-friendly villages.

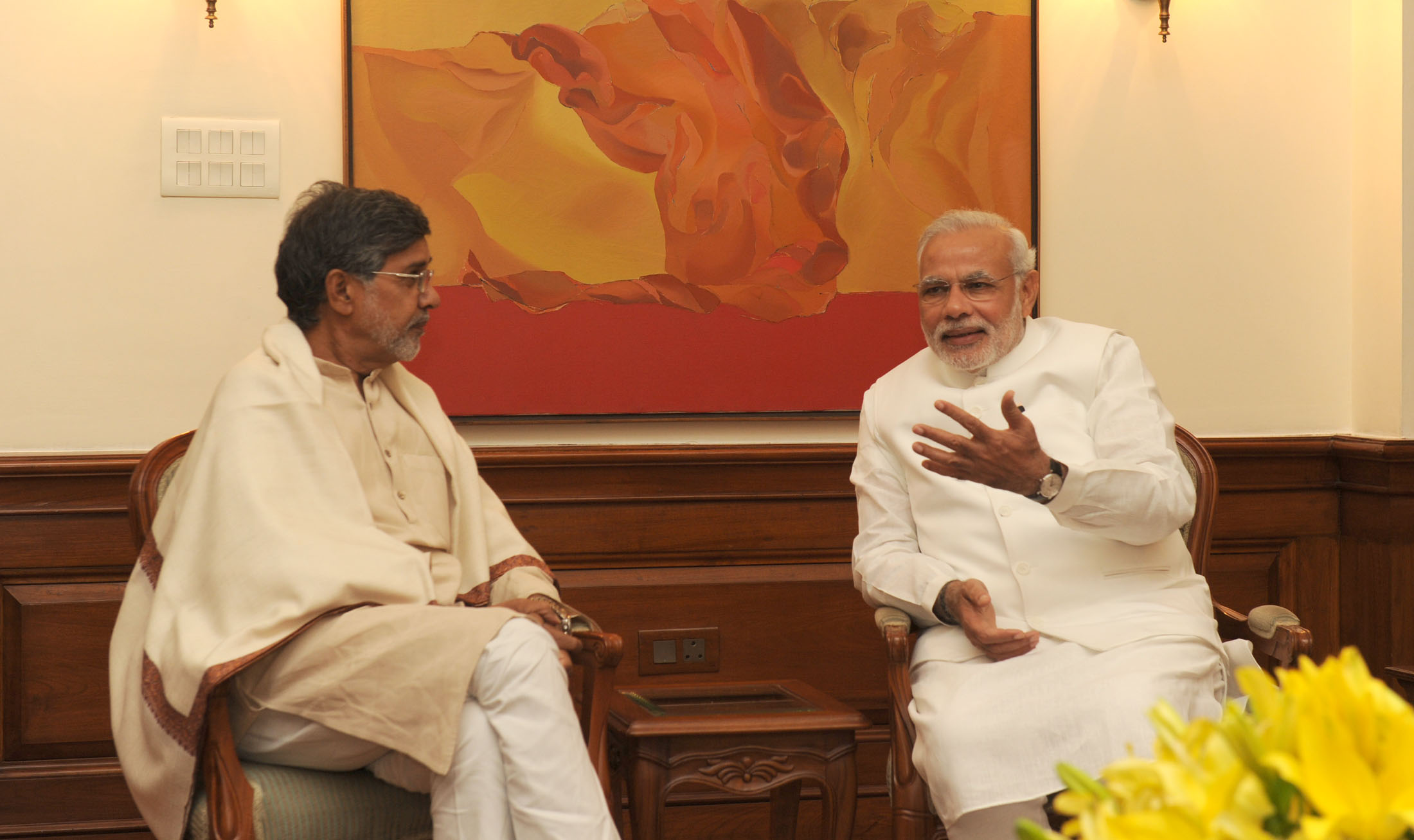
Indian Prime Minister Narendra Modi meets Nobel Laureate Kailash Satyarthi

- Satyarthi established GoodWeave International (formerly Rugmark), a network of a non-profit organizations dedicated to ending illegal child labor in the rug making industry which provided the first voluntary labeling, monitoring, and certification system of rugs manufactured without the use of child labor in South Asia. This organization operated a campaign in Europe and the United States in the late 1980s and early 1990s with the intent of raising consumer awareness of the issues relating to the accountability of global corporations regarding socially responsible consumerism and trade. Rugmark International re-branded the certification program and introduced the GoodWeave label in 2009. The organization was re-branded to GoodWeave International.

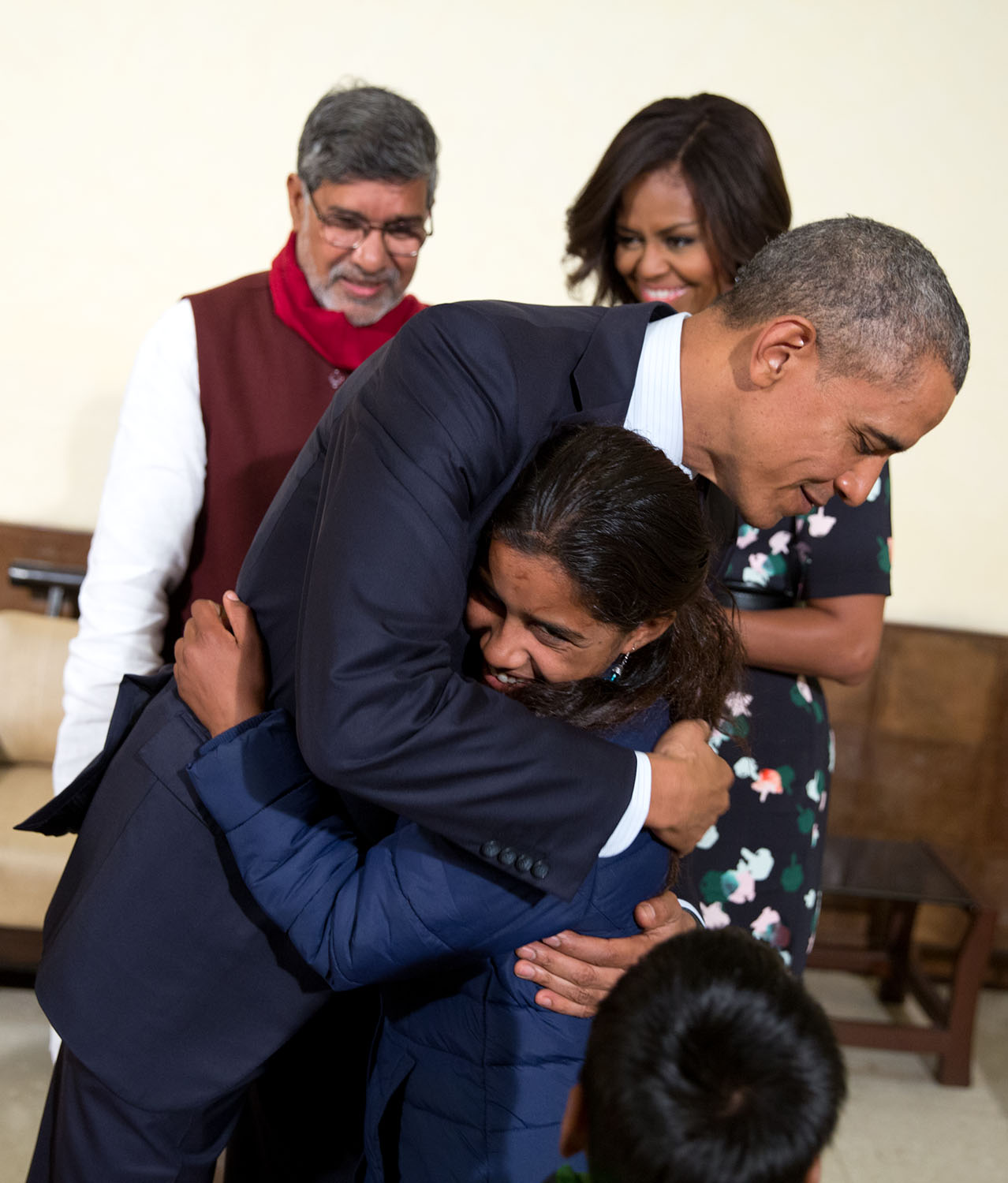
U.S. President Barack Obama greets a young girl (Payal Jangid) who was the guest of Nobel Peace Prize winner Kailash Satyarthi in New Delhi

- The Kailash Satyarthi Children's Foundation(KSCF) was established in 2004 by Satyarthi. It is a grassroots organization that spreads awareness and advocates for beneficial policies for children's rights. The foundation is the global umbrella for KSCF India and KSCF, USA.
- Satyarthi formed the Global Campaign for Education and became its president at its inception in 1999. Global Campaign for Education is an international coalition of non-governmental organizations, working to promote children's and adult education through research and advocacy. It was formed in 1999 as a partnership between NGOs that were separately active in the area, including Action Aid, Oxfam, Education International, Global March Against Child Labour and national organizations in Bangladesh, Brazil and South Africa.
- The 100 Million Campaign was established in 2016 by 6,000 young people standing side by side with Satyarthi. It is a youth-led campaign organizing for a world "where all young people are free, safe and educated." The campaign has partnerships with the Global Student Forum (GSF), All-Africa Students Union (AASU), European Students' Union (ESU), Organising Bureau of European School Student Unions (OBESSU), Commonwealth Students' Association (CSA), Education International, and the Inter-Parliamentary Union (IPU). The campaign operates in 35 countries on five continents.

== Bharat Yatra ==
The Bharat Yatra was launched by KSCF to spread awareness about child trafficking and sexual abuse. The campaign launched in Kanyakumari on 11 September 2017, and marched through seven routes covering 22 Indian states and Union Territories, and over 12,000 km. The campaign was aimed at starting a social dialogue about child sexual abuse and child trafficking, taboo issues in India, to protect children vulnerable within their homes, communities, and schools. The campaign collaborated with 5,000 civil society organizations, 60 Indian faith leaders, 500 Indian political leaders, 600 local, state, and national bodies of the Indian government, 300 members of the Indian judiciary, and 25,000 educational institutions across India.

More than 1,200,000 marched for 35 days which led to the Criminal Law Amendment Act 2018 with a strict deterrent against child rape. The Yatra resulted in the Anti-Human Trafficking Bill being passed by the 16th Lok Sabha.

== Personal life ==
Satyarthi lives in New Delhi, India. His family includes his wife, a son, daughter-in-law, a grandson, daughter and a son-in-law.

Satyarthi's Nobel Prize medal was stolen from his New Delhi residence in February 2017 and subsequently recovered.

== Awards and honours ==
Satyarthi has been the subject of documentary, television series, talk shows, advocacy and awareness films.

In September 2017, India Times listed Satyarthi as one of the 11 Human Rights Activists Whose Life Mission Is To Provide Others with a Dignified Life Satyarthi has been awarded the following honours:

- 1993: Elected Ashoka Fellow (USA)
- 1994: The Aachener International Peace Award (Germany)
- 1995: The Trumpeter Award (USA)
- 1995: Robert F. Kennedy Human Rights Award (USA)
- 1998: Golden Flag Award (Netherlands)
- 1999: Friedrich Ebert Stiftung Award (Germany)
- 2002: Wallenberg Medal, awarded by the University of Michigan
- 2006: Freedom Award (USA)
- 2007: recognized in the list of "Heroes Acting to End Modern Day Slavery" by the US State Department
- 2007: Gold medal of the Italian Senate (2007)
- 2008: Alfonso Comin International Award (Spain)
- 2009: Defenders of Democracy Award (USA)
- 2014: Nobel Peace Prize
- 2014: Honorary Doctor of Philosophy Degree by Alliance University
- 2015: Honorary Doctorate by Amity University, Gurgaon
- 2015: Harvard's University Award "Humanitarian of the Year"
- 2016 Member-Fellow, Australian Institute of Management
- 2016 Doctor of Humane Letters, Lynchburg College (USA)
- 2016 Doctor of Law (LLD), West Bengal University of Juridical Sciences (India)
- 2017: P.C Chandra Puraskaar
- 2017: Guinness World Record for Largest Child Safe Guarding Lesson
- 2017: Doctor Honoris Causa, EL Rector Magnífico de la Universidad Pablo de Olavide
- 2017: PC Chandra Puraskaar by P.C. Chandra Jewellers
- 2018: Honoris Causa in Science, Amity University (India)
- 2018: Santokhba Humanitarian Award 2018
- 2019: Wockhardt Foundation, Lifetime Achievement Award India TV
- 2019: Mother Teresa Memorial Award for Social Justice AsiaNews

== Books ==
- (2017) Will for Children, by Kailash Satyarthi; Prabhat Prakashan. ISBN 9789386300355
- (2017) ... Because Words Matter, by Kailash Satyarthi; Rupa Publications. ISBN 978-81-291-4845-2
- (2018) बदलाव के बोल, by Kailash Satyarthi; Prabhat Prakashan. ISBN 9789352664863
- (2018) Every Child Matters, by Kailash Satyarthi; Prabhat Prakashan. ISBN 9789352666386
- (2021) कोविड-19 सभ्यता का संकट और समाधान, by Kailash Satyarthi; Prabhat Prakashan. ISBN 978-93-90366-96-5

== See also ==
- Malala Yousafzai
- Iqbal Masih
- Ehsan Ullah Khan
- List of peace activists

Awards and achievements
Preceded by OPCW	Laureate of the Nobel Peace Prize; 2014; With: Malala Yousafzai	Succeeded by Tunisian National Dialogue Quartet
