= Pharis Harvey =

American pastor (1935–2026)

Pharis Harvey (1935 – April 16, 2026) was an American United Methodist pastor, missionary, and human rights activist. Harvey helped bring international attention to the South Korean pro-democracy movement during the military dictatorship in the 1970s and 1980s, especially in the aftermath of the 1980 Gwangju Uprising and massacre. Harvey served as a pivotal liaison between the Korean democracy movement and the international community. He mobilized international pressure on the South Korean dictatorship and advocated on behalf of South Korean political prisoners, including Kim Dae-jung, who was later elected president of South Korea.

Harvey later served as the executive director of the International Labor Rights Forum, based in Washington D.C.. He campaigned on behalf of global labor rights issues, including an end to child labor. In 1995, Harvey and other activists, including Kailash Satyarthi, led a march across India to call for a ban on child labor in that country.

Pharis Harvey died in California on April 16, 2026, at the age of 91.
