= United Nations Education and Academia Stakeholder Group =

- Abbreviation: EASG
- Formation: 2016
- Website: https://educationacademia.org

The Education and Academia Stakeholder Group (EASG) is an official United Nations stakeholder group composed of organisations dedicated to promoting the right inclusive and equitable quality education and lifelong learning opportunities for all. It was formed in 2016 and includes human rights-based civil society organisations and academic institutions. As a recognised stakeholder group, the EASG monitors and reviews the Sustainable Development Goals (SDGs). During the annual High-level Political Forum, EASG provides interventions and submits shadow reports shading light on developments countries downplay in their own reporting.

The EASG's primary focus is on the implementation of Agenda 2030 and specifically SDG 4. The EASG is part of the Major Groups and Other Stakeholders (MGoS) Coordination Mechanism, which ensures coordination across the various stakeholder groups in UN processes. The group is led by three organising partners: Global Campaign for Education, International Council for Adult Education, and Global Student Forum.
