= International Labor Rights Forum =

Nonprofit organization

- Founded: 1986
- Type: Non-profit, Interest group
- Location: Washington, D.C.
- Services: Media attention, direct-appeal campaigns, research, lobbying
- Fields: Protecting labor rights
- Key people: Judy Gearhart
- Website: laborrights.org

The International Labor Rights Forum (ILRF) is a nonprofit advocacy organization headquartered in Washington, D.C., U.S., that describes itself as "an advocate for and with the working poor around the world." ILRF, formerly the "International Labor Rights Education & Research Fund", was founded in 1986, and the organization's mission statement reads: "ILRF believes that all workers have the right to a safe working environment where they are treated with dignity and respect, and where they can organize freely to defend and promote their rights and interests. ILRF works to develop practical and effective tools to assist workers in winning enforcement of protections for their basic rights, and hold labor rights violators accountable."

== History ==
After Kailash Satyarthi and Bread for the World founded Rugmark in 1994, ILRF helped the nascent foundation open a U.S.-based office in Washington, D.C., in 1995. The two groups continued to share offices afterward.

In 2007, the litigation department of ILRF, noted for its use of the Alien Tort Claims Act in litigation against those who violate labor rights, was spun off into a separate organization, International Rights Advocates ("IRAdvocates"). Although it retains legal staff, the ILRF focuses primarily on research, lobbying, boycott campaigns and various other advocacy roles.

=== Rana Plaza collapse ===
After the collapse of the Rana Plaza factory on April 24, 2013, the ILRF appeared in the media to provide an analysis on the overall situation and respond to the actions of associated companies in the wake of the incident. The collapse resulted in the death of 1,129 garment workers, highlighting working conditions that were described as those of a "sweatshop" and remuneration that was considered "subsistence," while garments of high-end fashion labels and the U.S. government were found in the rubble. Liana Foxvog, ILRF's director of organizing and communications at the time, commented in regard to the U.S. government garments that were found:

... the fact that Marines' logo clothing was found in the rubble of the sweatshop fire should serve as a wake-up call to the U.S. Government to put into place safeguards to ensure decent working conditions in government supply chains and among licensees.

In June 2013, U.S. President Barack Obama announced the suspension of trade privileges with the Bangladeshi government until significant labor issues were resolved.

By July 2013, the "Bangladesh Worker Safety Initiative" proposal was released by the Alliance for Bangladesh Worker Safety, which was formed by a group of North American companies involved with the Bangladeshi manufacturing sector, including Walmart, Target, J.C. Penney and Gap. The key amendments of the proposal were the establishment of a hotline for workers to report concerns, the completion of inspections and the funding of safety upgrades to the garment facilities. The companies behind the Worker Safety Initiative had raised US$42 million worth of grants to improve factory infrastructure, and $100 million in low-rate loans and access to capital.

The ILRF was critical of the Worker Safety Initiative and Foxvog explained to the media that: the proposal was not legally binding; the hotline was ineffective because complaints would be received by the company without the involvement of an independent party; and the corresponding funds were insufficient. The ILRF, as well as other experts in the area, had calculated that it would cost around US$300,000 to $500,000 for each factory to be upgraded, meaning that a total of at least $1 billion was required to fulfill the aim of the Worker Safety Initiative. Furthermore, the ILRF, which was supported by the American Federation of Labor and Congress of Industrial Organizations (AFL–CIO) U.S. trade union federation, stated that workers would still require their wages while the renovations were being undertaken to survive.

The ILRF dismissed claims by the National Retail Federation, which feared the instatement of an increased legal liability upon the clothing companies, and supported the "Accord on Fire and Building Safety" that had been signed by European companies and some U.S. brands by July 2013. The Accord was legally binding and provided workers with the ability to seek arbitration for their grievances, which could result in a fine for the company if a breach was detected—Foxvog stated that the Accord allowed for a neutral arbiter and was not related to a class action.

The ILRF then published a December 2013 article in which it called for the U.S. federal government to enforce labor standards for overseas procurement including the option to sanction contractor firms that "do not comply with applicable laws and regulations and internationally accepted labor standards." The importance of independent monitoring and the engagement of workers and unions were also emphasized by the ILRF. Björn Skorpen Claeson, an ILRF senior policy analyst at the time, said to the Huffington Post:

The government should expect to pay for products made in decent working conditions, in compliance with all applicable labor standards, by workers who earn a living wage—that is, a fair price. ... In the context of procurement, paying a fair price is the way the government "invests" in compliance.

The Dangerous Silence: Exchanges Turn Blind Eye to Suppliers report was published by the ILRF on February 12, 2014, highlighting the role of U.S. military exchanges in the Bangladeshi garment industry. The report, of which Claeson is the principal author, states that some of the military exchanges "remain ignorant of flagrant violations in their supplier factories, because the industry audit reports failed to disclose them." The director of the ILRF at the time, Judy Gearhart, said that "it's not acceptable for U.S. government-owned companies to be not holding up the highest bar" and that the issue presents a "huge risk" to the reputation of the U.S.

== Activities ==
ILRF, working in coalition with other human rights and sweatshop-oriented NGOs, uses a diverse range of mechanisms to promote its vision of labor rights.

According to its website, the ILRF has worked directly to promote labor rights through:

- Research and publication
- Public campaigning and media outreach
- Promoting new International Labour Organization Conventions and their ratification
- Promoting reform of US legislation
- Advising multinational corporations on issues of corporate social responsibility
- Using litigation, especially the Alien Tort Claims Act (ATCA), to hold corporations accountable
- Using trade-related complaints processes to hold governments accountable

== Campaigns ==
=== Fairness in Flowers ===
ILRF's Fairness in Flowers Campaign was launched in 2003 to promote the rights of workers in the cut flower industry. ILRF advocates on behalf of the workers, supports a legal center in Ecuador that helps them bring work-related grievances against their employers, and collaborates with certification initiatives like Fair Flowers Fair Plants (FFP) and Veriflora.

=== Child labor ===
Approximately 211 million of the world's children, between the ages of 5 and 14, work at least part-time, according to the International Labour Organization (ILO), the tripartite body representing governments, labor, and employees. Of these, 120 million children are working full-time to help support their impoverished families. Although child labor is most common in developing countries, it is found throughout the world, including in the United States. Many of these children are forced into the workforce to become beggars, farm hands, and factory workers. They are exposed to conditions extremely harmful to their physical and mental well-being. ILRF has helped develop programs to fight child labor and is involved in monitoring conditions in various regions of the world. ILRF is also currently engaged in two corporate campaigns related to child labor: one targeting the Firestone Tire and Rubber Company for their use of child labor on a rubber plantation in Liberia and the other focusing on the chocolate industry for child labor on cocoa farms in West Africa.

In 1995, International Labor Rights Forum executive director Pharis Harvey and other activists, including Kailash Satyarthi, organized a nationwide march in India to call for an end to child labor in that country.

=== Rights For Working Women Campaign ===
ILRF has recently developed a Rights For Working Women Campaign which seeks to alleviate labor conditions that disproportionately affect working women in developing countries through research, public education, litigation, legislative action, and grassroots mobilization. To begin the campaign, ILRF has undertaken a global initiative to promote increased awareness of and viable remedies for the problem of workplace sexual harassment. As of 1997, there were only thirty-six countries with legislation specifically targeting sexual harassment. Of those countries, only 12 were from Latin America, the Caribbean or Africa. It is not uncommon for women to be subjected to bodily searches or fired for refusing sexual advances. The prevalence of subcontracting and other forms of "flexible" work arrangements in the global economy make it very difficult for women to organize against such abuse.

=== Accord on Fire and Building Safety ===
Designed to hold companies around the world accountable to worker safety in sweatshop conditions, ILRF created the Accord on Fire and Building Safety in 2012. As of July 2017, the accord has been signed by over 200 apparel companies. A list of 14 U.S. companies refused to sign the accord: Walmart, Gap, Macy's, Sears/Kmart, J. C. Penney, VF Corp., Target, Kohl's, Cato Fashions, Carter's, Nordstrom, American Eagle Outfitters, The Children's Place, and Foot Locker.
