= Kim Dae-jung =

President of South Korea from 1998 to 2003

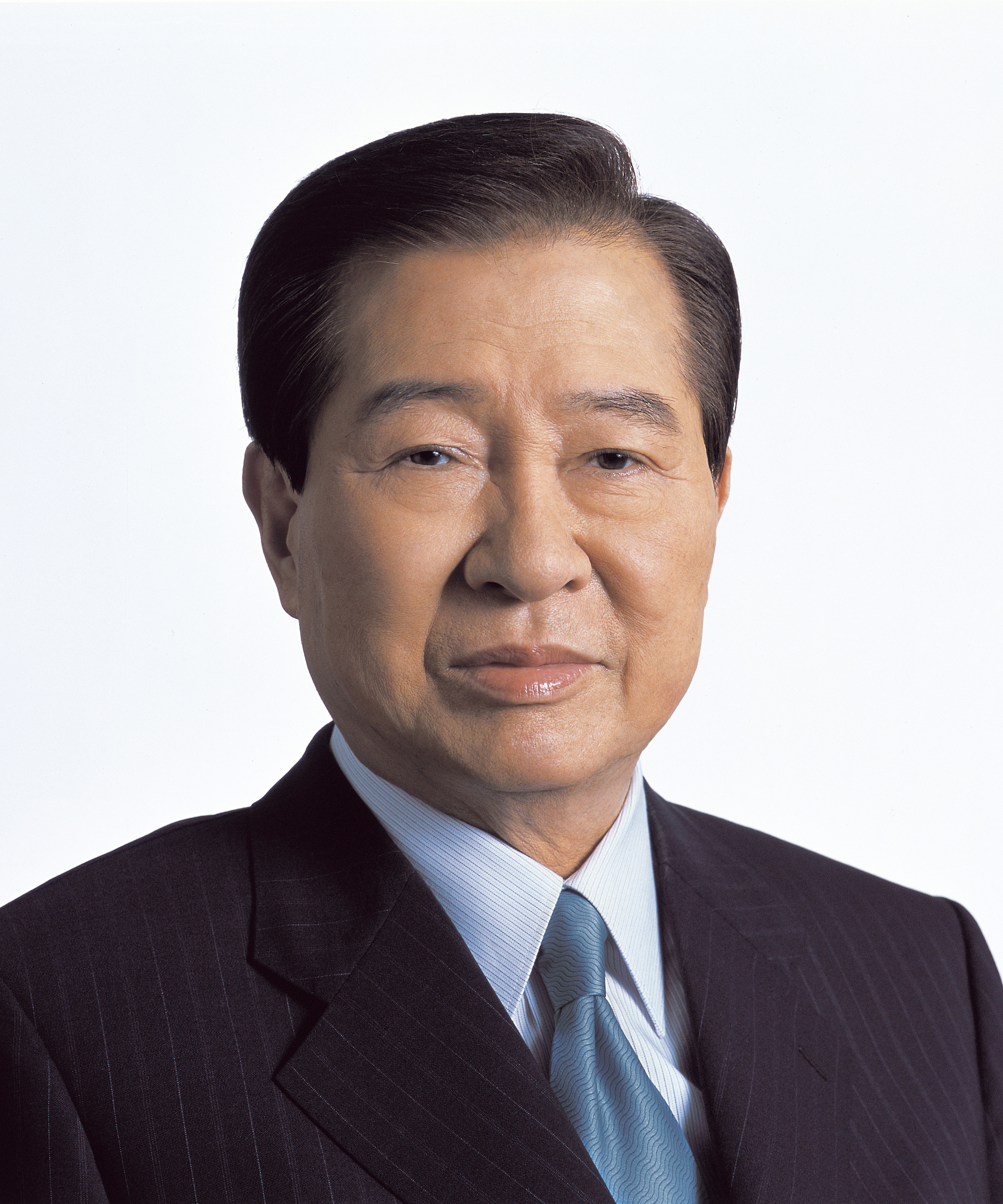
- Official portrait, 1998

8th President of South Korea
- In office 25 February 1998 – 24 February 2003
- Prime Minister: Goh Kun; Kim Jong-pil; Park Tae-joon; Lee Hun-jai (acting); Lee Han-dong; Chang Sang (acting); Jeon Yun-churl (acting); Chang Dae-whan (acting); Kim Suk-soo
- Preceded by: Kim Young-sam
- Succeeded by: Roh Moo-hyun

President of the Millennium Democratic Party
- In office 20 January 2000 – 8 November 2001
- Preceded by: Position established (as President of the National Congress for New Politics)
- Succeeded by: Han Kwang-ok (acting); Position abolished

President of the National Congress for New Politics
- In office 5 September 1995 – 20 January 2000

Member of the National Assembly
- In office 30 May 1988 – 19 December 1992
- Constituency: Proportional Representation
- In office 1 July 1971 – 17 October 1972
- Constituency: Proportional Representation
- In office 17 December 1963 – 30 June 1971
- Constituency: Mokpo (South Jeolla)
- In office 14 May 1961 – 16 May 1961
- Constituency: Inje (Gangwon)

Personal details
- Born: 6 January 1924 Sinan, Hauido, Zenranan Province, Korea, Empire of Japan
- Died: 18 August 2009 (aged 85) Seoul, South Korea
- Resting place: Seoul National Cemetery
- Party: Democratic (1955–1961, 1963–1965); People (1965–1967); New Democratic (1967–1972); Independent (1972–1987, 1987, 1995); Reunification Democratic (1987); Peace Democratic (1987–1991); New United Democratic Party (1991); Democratic (1991–1995); National Congress (1995–2000); Millennium Democratic (2000–2002); Independent (2002–2009)
- Spouses: Cha Yong-ae (m. 1945; died 1959) Lee Hee-ho (m. 1962)
- Children: 3
- Education: Mokpo Commercial High School
- Awards: Nobel Peace Prize (2000); Philadelphia Liberty Medal (1999)

Korean name
- Hangul: 김대중
- Hanja: 金大中
- RR: Gim Daejung
- MR: Kim Taejung
- IPA: kim.dɛ.dʑuŋ

Art name
- Hangul: 후광
- Hanja: 後廣 (Note: Kim's art name comes from Hugwang-ri (후광리; 後廣里), a large piece of farmland formed from tidal flats behind the main village of his native Hauido, South Jeolla Province.)
- RR: Hugwang
- MR: Hugwang

Kim Dae-jung (Korean: 김대중; 6 January 1924 – 18 August 2009) was a South Korean politician, statesman and activist who served as the eighth President of South Korea from 1998 to 2003.

Born in Hauido during Japanese colonial rule, Kim graduated from Mokpo Commercial School and later worked at a Japanese shipping company in Mokpo and later established his own shipping business after World War II. Originally an entrepreneur, Kim abandoned business and entered politics after the Korean War, becoming a member of the new wing of the Democratic Party.

He was an opposition politician who carried out a democratization movement against the military dictatorship from the Third Republic in the 1960s to the Fifth Republic in the 1980s. He escaped death five times, spent six years in prison and ten years under house arrest and in exile. He was repeatedly imprisoned, exiled, almost killed by vehicular homicide, and sentenced to death by the military and political authorities.

He ran unsuccessfully in presidential elections in 1971, 1987, and 1992. In the country's 15th presidential election in 1997, he defeated Grand National Party candidate Lee Hoi-chang through an alliance with Kim Jong-pil and the Democratic Liberal Party. Kim was the first opposition candidate to win the presidency. At the time of his inauguration in 1998, he was 74 years old, making him the oldest president in Korean history.

During his tenure, Kim Dae-jung worked to revive the South Korean economy, which had been hit by the 1997 Asian financial crisis, and reformed the South Korean economic system, enabling South Korea to successfully complete the privatization of enterprises and the transformation of its industrial structure. He promoted the Sunshine Policy, a policy of détente toward North Korea, and held the first-ever inter-Korean summit with North Korean leader Kim Jong Il in June 2000. In addition, he effectively maintained peace and stability on the Korean Peninsula by coordinating the development of relations with the United States, Japan, China and Russia, and enhanced South Korea's international status and prestige.

In 2000, he was awarded the Nobel Peace Prize for his work for democracy and human rights in South Korea and in East Asia in general, and for peace and reconciliation with North Korea and Japan in December 2000. Kim is the only Korean to have been awarded the Nobel Peace Prize to date. He was sometimes referred to as "the Nelson Mandela of Asia".

== Early life ==
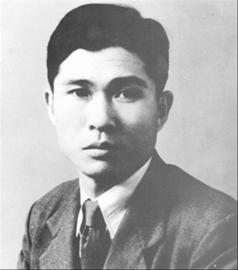
Kim Dae-jung in 1943

Kim Dae-jung was born on 6 January 1924, but his father later changed his registered birth date to 3 December 1925 to exempt him from conscription during Japanese colonial rule. Kim was born on the island of Hauido, Sinan County, Zenranan Province, Korea, Empire of Japan (now Jeonnam-Gwangju Special Metropolitan City, South Korea). Hauido is a small island 34 kilometers from Mokpo. The island's inhabitants mainly made a living by farming. During the annexation of Korea by Japan, the entire island was sold to the Japanese, and all the farmers on the island became tenant farmers of the Japanese, which triggered the "Hauido Farmers Movement". The landlords of Hauido changed nine times on paper. When Kim Dae-jung was young, Hauido was sold to a Japanese man named Tokuda Hiroshichi, and became Tokuda Farm. Influenced by his family, Kim Dae-jung was interested in politics from a young age. When he was eight or nine years old, Kim Dae-jung often read political reports in the newspaper.

Kim was the second of seven children. His father, Kim Un-sik, was a farmer and a village official who was resistant to the Japanese rule. At the same time, Kim Un-sik was very open-minded and believed that the country needed to open its doors to development. The village official's family received the newspaper Maeil sinbo sent by the government every day. Kim was a 12th generation descendant of Kim Ik-soo (김익수; 金益壽) who served as Second Minister of the Board of War (김병조참판; 兵曹參判) and the civil minister (김문신; 文臣) who was involved in the construction of Gwansanggam during Joseon period. Ik-soo is the grandson of Kim Young-jeong (김영정; 金永貞) of Gimhae Kim clan, this makes him a distant relative of Kim Jong-pil.

When Kim Dae-jung was seven years old and of school age, there was no formal primary school on Hauido. His father sent him to a private school on the island. The following year, after a formal four-year primary school was built on the island, he was directly enrolled in the second grade of primary school. When Kim Dae-jung was in the fourth grade of primary school, to enable him to continue his schooling, his family sold their ancestral property and moved to Mokpo City. Kim Dae-jung transferred to the six-year Mokpo Public First Ordinary School (now Mokpo Bukgyo Primary School). When he was in the fifth grade of Mokpo Primary School, Korean language was banned, the school's previous Korean language courses were canceled, and even the use of Korean language to communicate was prohibited on campus, otherwise he would be punished.

In 1939, Kim Dae-jung graduated from Mokpo Elementary School with the highest score and was admitted to the five-year Japanese-style Mokpo Commercial School (now Mokpo Commercial High School) with the highest score. Among the new students, Japanese students and Korean students each accounted for half. During this period, Kim Dae-jung showed a talent for debate and public speaking. This talent was fully utilized after he entered politics. Because Kim Dae-jung was among the top students, he was elected as the class monitor. However, he was later dismissed from his position as class monitor because he wrote an article condemning Japanese colonial rule. When he was in the second year, the school required Korean students to change their names per the sōshi-kaimei ordinance, forcing him to change his name to Toyota Taichū (豊田大中). This was a blow to Kim Dae-jung. Once, Kim Dae-jung had a quarrel with Japanese students who were provoking trouble, which eventually turned into a brawl between Korean and Japanese students. Kim Dae-jung was therefore regarded as a "bad element" by the Japanese. When he was in the third grade, Kim Dae-jung originally wanted to take the college entrance examination after graduation, so he transferred to the college entrance examination preparation class. However, in 1943, due to the Japanese military's repeated defeats in the Pacific War, Kim Dae-jung's grade was arranged to graduate a year early. Kim Dae-jung's dream of going to university was also shattered by the war.

=== Business career ===
When Kim Dae-jung graduated from Mokpo Commercial School, the Japanese government began to conscript soldiers in large numbers as the war situation became unfavorable to Japan. To help him avoid conscription, Kim Dae-jung's father changed his birth date to 3 December 1925. Due to the shortage of manpower at the time, which was in the later stages of the war, Kim Dae-jung easily found a job at a Japanese shipping company in Mokpo. His Japanese boss also acted as a guarantor for him, allowing him to escape police surveillance. On 9 April 1945, Kim Dae-jung married Cha Yong-ae, the younger sister of a classmate from Mokpo Commercial School.

After World War II, Kim Dae-jung was elected as the chairman of the operating committee of the former Japanese shipping company and took over the company for a period of time. Later, the US military government took back the management rights of the company, but Kim Dae-jung, as a representative of the employees, went to Seoul to negotiate and regain the management rights. His prestige in the business world also rose accordingly. At that time, the staff of Daeyang Shipbuilding Industry, the largest shipyard in Mokpo, also invited him to manage the company. So he managed the shipyard for a period of time. Shortly after the birth of Hong-il, the eldest son of Kim Dae-jung and Cha Yong-ae, Kim Dae-jung established his own Mokpo Shipping Company to operate shipping business between Mokpo, Busan, Gunsan and Incheon. The couple also moved into a two-story house in Changnak-dong. While operating the shipping business, he also joined a newspaper originally run by Japanese people, the Mokpo Daily. He quickly went from being a trainee editor and reporter to a senior editor and reporter. In 1948, due to his outstanding performance, Kim Dae-jung, who was only 25 years old, became the president of the Mokpo Daily.

On 25 June 1950, the Korean War broke out. At the time, Kim Dae-jung was on a business trip in Seoul. On the 28th, Kim Dae-jung woke up to find that the Korean People's Army had occupied Seoul. The chaos of the war forced Kim Dae-jung to return to his hometown as soon as possible. The distance from Seoul to Mokpo was about 400 kilometers. Amidst the roar of fighter planes, Kim Dae-jung risked his life to escape back to Mokpo over 20 days, finally seeing his mother waiting anxiously at the door. However, before Kim Dae-jung arrived in Mokpo, it had already been occupied by the Korean People's Army. Kim Dae-jung's house was the largest in the vicinity at the time. When Kim Dae-jung returned, all his property had been confiscated. Kim Dae-jung's wife was about to give birth, and the whole family hid in an air-raid shelter. Kim Dae-jung's second son, Hong-eop, was born in the air-raid shelter. (Note: Kim Dae-jung's eldest son was born during a difficult labor, which led to the death of his eldest daughter at birth.) Three days after returning to Mokpo, Kim Dae-jung was arrested as a "capitalist". His brother and father-in-law were also arrested. Kim Dae-jung was imprisoned for two months and was originally to be executed. However, he was spared death because the United Nations Forces landed in Incheon and the Korean People's Army stationed in Mokpo hastily withdrew north. (Note: Kim Dae-jung's younger brother, Dae-ui, was arrested for having served in the South Korean army. Six of the nine people in his cell were taken away. The remaining three, including Kim Dae-jung himself, escaped after hearing that the Korean People's Army was retreating. Kim Dae-jung's father-in-law, the owner of two large printing factories in Jeolla Province, was arrested and taken to the execution ground to be shot. At the moment of execution, Kim Dae-jung's father-in-law fainted. Knowing they had missed, the People's Army fired two more shots, but both bullets whizzed past his ears.) His brother and father-in-law also miraculously escaped death. His other family members were also safe and sound under the care of the employees of Kim Dae-jung's company.

Kim Dae-jung's company originally owned three ships. One ship was requisitioned by the authorities to transport military equipment, and another was lost in the war. Kim Dae-jung used the remaining ship to start a new business. The Mokpo Daily News was originally the largest local newspaper operated by the Japanese during the Japanese occupation. The Korean War plunged the newspaper into a severe economic crisis. At the invitation of the newspaper's employees, Kim Dae-jung acquired the newspaper in October 1950. On 4 January 1951, the Korean People's Army reoccupied Seoul. The war situation worsened again for the South. South Korea temporarily moved its government to Busan, which became the wartime capital. Kim Dae-jung also moved his family to Busan to develop his shipping business. He established Heungguk Shipping Co., Ltd. in Busan. In addition to the company's original two ships, Kim Dae-jung took out loans to buy three second-hand ships and leased five more, operating a total of ten ships. He monopolized the transportation business of grain, fertilizer, and pesticides for the Financial Cooperation Federation at the time. Before he was even 30 years old, Kim Dae-jung had already become a well-known entrepreneur. However, the infighting among his own people during the Korean War and the chaos under the rule of Syngman Rhee's government also strengthened his resolve to enter politics.

== Early political career ==
=== Leaving business for politics ===
In 1954, Kim Dae-jung abandoned his thriving shipping business and began a bumpy political career. In the same year, he moved his family from Busan back to Mokpo and participated in the third National Assembly election in Mokpo. The labor union had a great influence on the Mokpo election. Because Kim Dae-jung understood workers and was enthusiastic about improving the working conditions of workers, he received the full support and recommendation of the Mokpo Labor Union. The labor union was an organization of the ruling Liberal Party. They put forward a condition that Kim Dae-jung would not participate in the opposition Democratic National Party. Kim Dae-jung agreed to this demand. Because Kim Dae-jung opposed the dictatorship of Syngman Rhee, he was also unwilling to participate in the ruling Liberal Party. In the end, Kim Dae-jung participated in the election as an independent. With the support of the labor union, Kim was originally sure to win. But later the Liberal Party arrested all the cadres of the labor union on the grounds that they, as state cadres, did not support the Liberal Party candidate but supported the independent candidate. Kim's first election in politics was therefore unsuccessful.

On 25 September 1956, Kim, persuaded by Chang Myon, formally joined the opposition Democratic Party. In the spring of 1958, he ran for the fourth National Assembly election in Inje County. Inje County was a newly established constituency after the Korean War, with 80% of its voters being military personnel. Due to severe corruption within the military at the time, the soldiers strongly supported the opposition party and hoped for a new regime to take control of the military. However, Kim's candidacy was heavily obstructed by the Liberal Party, and his candidate registration was ultimately deemed invalid. Kim then filed a lawsuit for "obstruction of candidate registration". In March 1959, the court ruled in favor of Kim Dae-jung, and his election as a ruling party candidate for National Assembly was disqualified. In June, Kim participated in a by-election. To prevent Kim's election, the Liberal Party accused him of being a communist and of election fraud. Kim lost his second attempt to run for parliament. To raise campaign funds, he nearly exhausted his family's wealth and sold his house before participating in the 1960 legislative election, leaving him in dire straits. His first wife, Cha Yong-ae, ran a hair salon to make ends meet. Due to overwork, Cha Yong-ae died of heart disease on 27 May 1960.

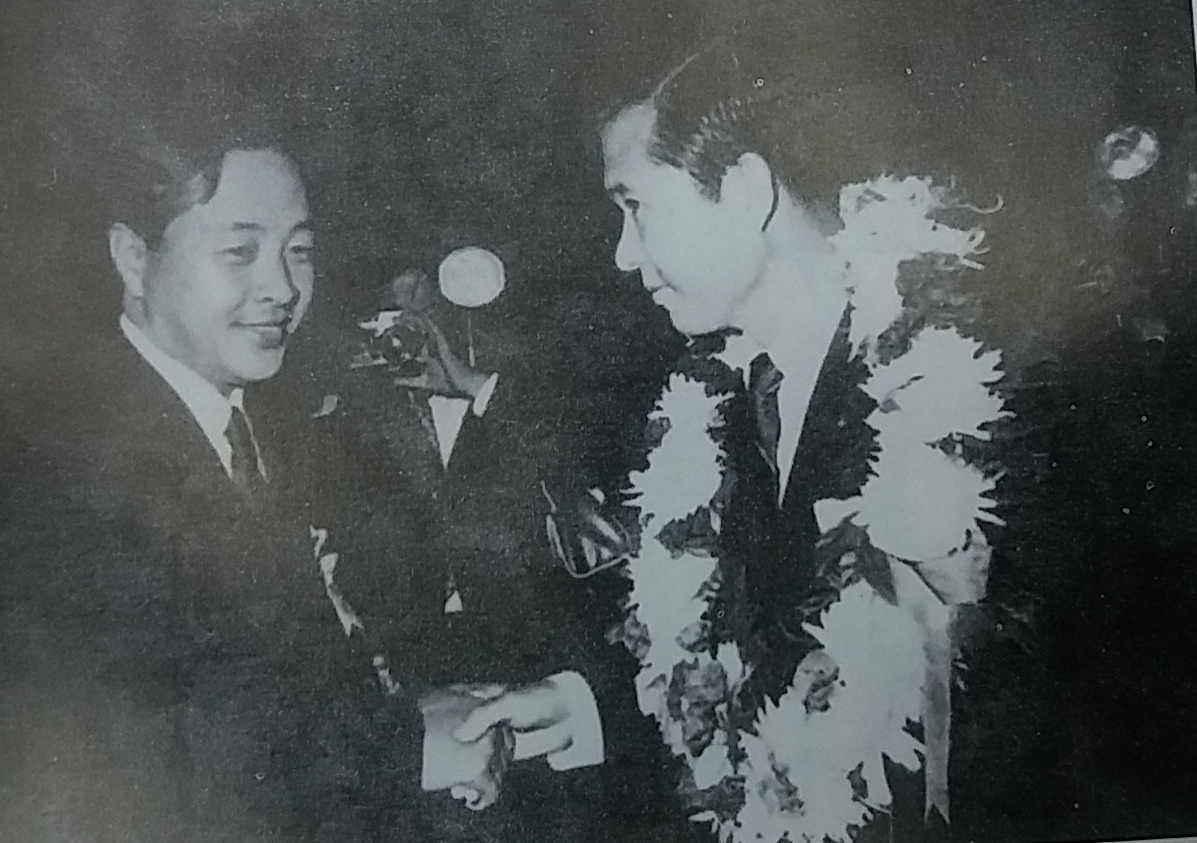
Kim Dae-jung and Kim Young-sam in 1960

15 March 1960 was the fourth presidential election in South Korea. Kim campaigned for the Democratic Party candidate. The crumbling Syngman Rhee regime, in order to seek re-election, engaged in large-scale election fraud, which triggered a large-scale mass demonstration. Kim also represented the Democratic Party in the protest. On 26 April, Rhee announced his resignation under pressure. In July, Kim once again participated in the fifth National Assembly election in Inje County. However, this election was the first absentee election in history, and the soldiers who supported Kim could not participate in the election, resulting in his defeat again. However, in this election, his talent was discovered by Prime Minister Chang Myon. Kim was promoted to the position of spokesperson for the Democratic Party. Even more fortunately, the Liberal Party candidate who defeated Kim was stripped of his parliamentary qualification for dereliction of duty and suspected illegal election. In the subsequent Inje County by-election, Kim was finally elected as a member of parliament on 14 May 1961, and received his certificate of election on the same day. On 16 May, Army Major General Park Chung-hee launched a military coup. The National Assembly of South Korea was dissolved the day after Kim was elected. Kim, who had not yet taken the oath, was also stripped of his parliamentary seat. In order to win over the people, the military government purged the Democratic Party under the banner of eliminating corruption. As the spokesperson of the Democratic Party, Kim was arrested on suspicion of corruption and "harboring communism". Without evidence, detention warrant and arrest warrant, Kim Dae-jung was detained for three months before being released. After being released from prison, Kim moved to Seoul with his two sons and lived with his mother and his sister who was studying at Ewha Womans University. Kim's sister had congenital heart valve disease, but as Kim was unemployed and poor, he could not help her. In the autumn of 1961, when Kim was at his poorest, he ran into Lee Hee-ho, an old friend he had met ten years earlier in Busan. The two married on 10 May 1962, and had a son named Hong-jae.

=== Member of the National Assembly ===
On 27 February 1963, the Park Chung-hee military government lifted the ban on the Political Activity Purification Law and began to establish the Democratic Republican Party in preparation for the fifth presidential election. Kim Dae-jung, who had been suppressed for two years, also began to participate in the reconstruction of the Democratic Party and became active in the political arena as the spokesperson of the Democratic Party. In November 1963, Kim Dae-jung participated in the sixth National Assembly election in Mokpo. Having experienced the failure and setbacks of the previous five elections, Kim Dae-jung was elected with an absolute advantage of 22,513 votes and became a member of the National Assembly. Kim Dae-jung cherished his hard-won position as a member of the National Assembly. In order to prepare his speech for the National Assembly, he spent his days in the National Assembly Library looking for information. In the six months following the opening of the first plenary session of the National Assembly, Kim Dae-jung became the legislator who spoke the most. His speeches were based on examples and data and often put the ruling party in a difficult position.

In 1964, the Park Chung-hee government began negotiations to normalize diplomatic relations with Japan, sparking large-scale protests. Kim Dae-jung shared similar views with the ruling party on this issue, supporting normalization, which drew criticism from the opposition democratic camp and the public, earning him the label of "lackey of the ruling party". Even his father wrote a letter criticizing him. Unlike the ruling party, Kim Dae-jung believed that the $300 million in compensation demanded by the Park Chung-hee government was insignificant, and that it would be better to refuse it entirely, demanding a sincere apology from Japan. On 3 June 1965, the protests against normalizing relations with Japan reached their peak. Park Chung-hee was even prepared to step down. Japan and South Korea were both allies of the United States. The United States, which had initially disliked Park Chung-hee, began to support him due to the issue of normalizing relations between South Korea and Japan. U.S. Ambassador to South Korea, Samuel D. Berger, and Commander of the UN Forces Korea, Hywood, flew over the protesters in a helicopter and landed at the Blue House. That evening, Park issued a martial law order, and the demonstrations were suppressed. On 22 June, South Korea and Japan signed the Treaty on Basic Relations, formally establishing diplomatic relations.

In 1965, the United States began to ask South Korea to send troops to aid in the Vietnam War. South Korean political parties were divided again. Kim Dae-jung also opposed sending troops to Vietnam. The opposition's position deepened the gap with the United States, while the relationship between the Park Chung-hee government and the United States became closer. Shortly after sending troops to Vietnam, Park Chung-hee was invited by US President Johnson to visit the United States and received the highest honors from the leaders of brother countries. However, history proved that South Korea did benefit from sending troops to Vietnam. With the help of US and Japanese aid and the prosperity of the military industry, South Korea's annual economic growth rate exceeded 10%. 1965–1969 also became the peak period of Park Chung-hee's rule. On 21 February 1966, Kim Dae-jung visited the United States for the first time at the invitation of the US State Department, along with two other members of Congress. In September, Kim Dae-jung and other moderate members of Congress went to Vietnam to inspect the South Korean military.

In 1965, the Democratic Party, the People's Justice Party, the Liberal Democratic Party, the Nationalist Party, and the People's Party merged into a single opposition People's Party, and Kim Dae-jung was elected as its spokesperson and head of the propaganda bureau. In August 1966, Kim Dae-jung became a core leader of the People's Party, serving as the chairman of the party's policy committee and a member of the Central Executive Bureau. On 7 February 1967, the two major opposition parties, the People's Party and the Shinhan Party, merged into the New People's Party, and Kim Dae-jung was elected as a member of the Central Executive Bureau of the New People's Party and the spokesperson of the New People's Party. In June 1967, Kim Dae-jung once again participated in the election for the seventh National Assembly in his hometown of Mokpo. As Kim Dae-jung's influence in politics expanded, Park Chung-hee had already regarded him as a thorn in his side. On the eve of the election, Park Chung-hee and the ruling party made a decision that they would rather have the ruling party candidate lose 20 places in other regions than let Kim Dae-jung be elected. Park Chung-hee also personally came to Mokpo twice to campaign for the ruling party candidate. However, Kim Dae-jung was ultimately elected by a narrow margin of 2,000 votes. However, the ruling party won two-thirds of the seats in the National Assembly for the "third election to amend the constitution".

Campaign poster featuring Kim in the 1971 presidential election

=== 1971 presidential election ===
On 17 October 1969, after the opposition party tried its best to stop it but failed, Park Chung-hee's "three-election constitutional reform" plan was passed by the National Assembly. This cleared the legal obstacles for Park Chung-hee to serve as president for the third time. Park Chung-hee's success dealt a heavy blow to South Korean democracy. The leadership of the New Democratic Party at that time was already very old. The aging and conservative ideas, coupled with the failure to resist Park Chung-hee's "three-election constitutional reform", made the atmosphere within the party very depressed. On 8 November 1969, Kim Young-sam, the head of the General Affairs Department of the New Democratic Party, proposed the "40-year-old generation standard-bearer theory", advocating the transfer of political dominance to young politicians in their 40s, which was supported by party members Kim Young-sam, Kim Dae-jung and Lee Cheol-seung, three young leaders in their 40s, became competitors for the New Democratic Party's presidential candidate in 1971. On 29 September 1970, Kim Dae-jung was finally elected as the New Democratic Party's presidential candidate after two rounds of voting.

Kim promised a welfare-oriented "mass economy" and also advocated easing tensions with North Korea, while predicting correctly that if Park was reelected, he would become a "generalissimo". Kim Dae-jung believed that in order to win the presidential election, the opposition party needed to reshape its image and come up with a complete set of governance plans. In October 1970, Kim Dae-jung, as the presidential candidate of the New Democratic Party, held a press conference in Seoul. At the conference, Kim Dae-jung announced a complete set of governance plans, including the unification of North and South Korea, the abolition of the "local reserve army system" which the people complained about, and the economic reform plan of establishing a labor-management co-management committee, which had a significant impact on Korean society. Kim Dae-jung's economic reform plan later became part of his "mass participation economy". In 1985, Harvard University published Kim Dae-jung's "Mass Participation Economy". In February 1971, Kim Dae-jung and his wife Lee Hee-ho visited Japan and the United States, aiming to promote the New Democratic Party's policies to the two countries and seek support and establish cooperative relations. During his stay in the United States, Kim Dae-jung visited key officials of the U.S. State Department and members of Congress such as Edward Kennedy. Lee Hee-ho also visited First Lady Pat Nixon at the White House and took a photo with her. To counter Kim Dae-jung's influence, the Park Chung-hee regime resorted to any means necessary. During Kim Dae-jung's visit to the United States, his residence was bombed. The authorities arrested more than 50 people on the grounds of "insider involvement". Kim Dae-jung's nephew, a second-year middle school student, was subjected to waterboarding and forced to give false testimony, and was made a scapegoat, accused of being the bomber. (Note: The presiding judge, Jo Jun-hui (Korean: 조준희; Hanja: 趙准熙), released Kim's nephew due to insufficient evidence and consequently was stripped of his judgeship. He later became a well-known human rights lawyer.) A few days later, a fire mysteriously broke out in the house of election committee chairman Jung Il-hyung in the early morning. The authorities announced that the fire was caused by a cat bringing fire from the heated floor. This absurd incident became a topic of discussion overseas and was ranked among the top ten news stories in South Korea that year. To obstruct Kim Dae-jung's election, the Park Chung-hee military government falsely accused Kim Dae-jung of being a "communist-friendly" element and incited regional conflicts. Because the opposition party leader and the presidential candidate were not the same person, and due to the infighting among the compromise faction within the party, Kim Dae-jung was essentially fighting alone. In addition, the authorities also arrested and persecuted business people who sponsored Kim Dae-jung's campaign.

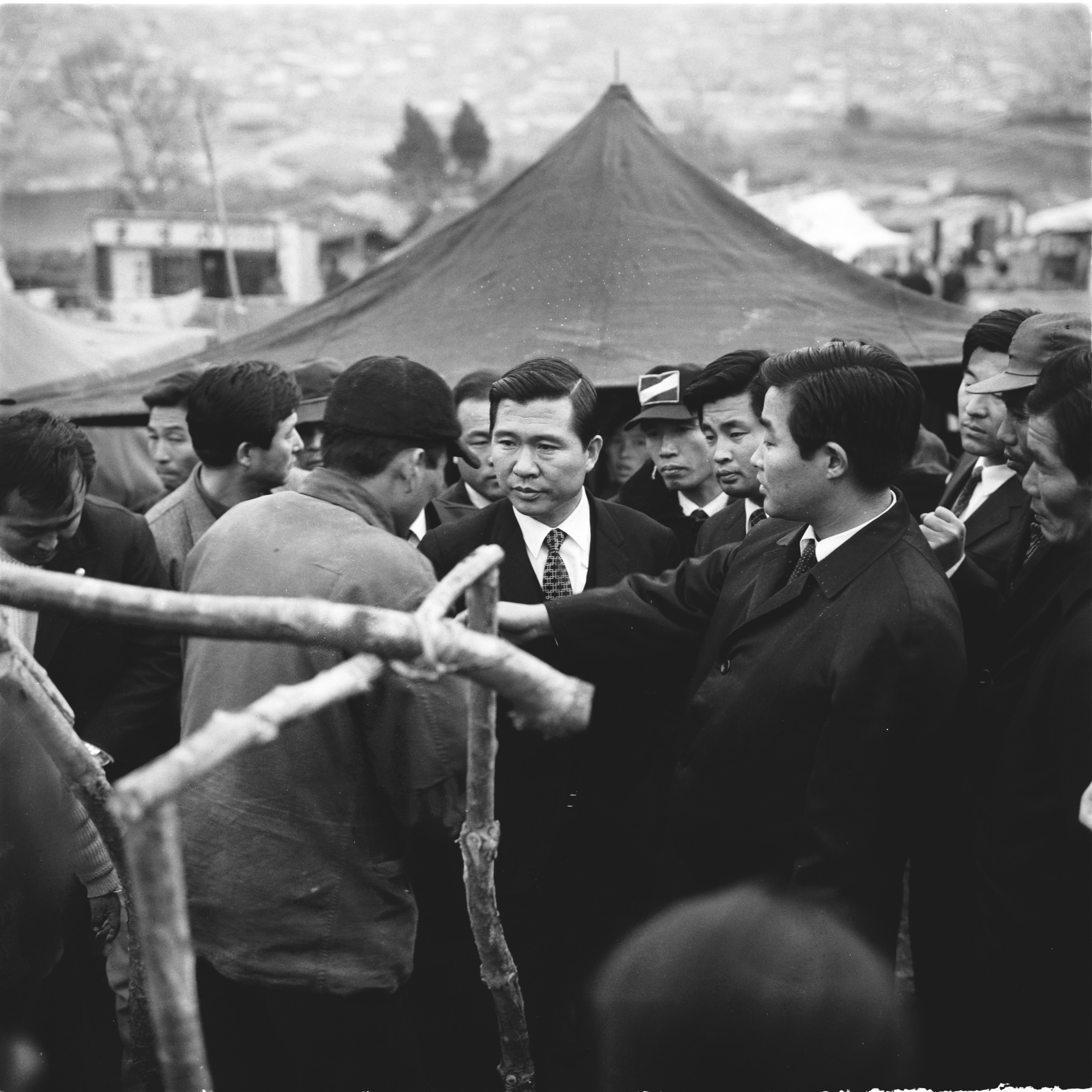
Kim Dae-jung, during his 1971 election campaign, visited the Gwangju Industrial Complex.

In April 1971, Kim Dae-jung ran for president for the first time as the opposition party's presidential candidate, challenging President Park Chung-hee. During the three months of the election, he traveled to various places every day, averaging 400-800 kilometers a day, and was called "Iron Man" by the public. The ruling Democratic Republican Party grassroots tried their best to obstruct Kim Dae-jung's election activities. However, Kim Dae-jung was still welcomed by the local people wherever he went. In Daegu, Park Chung-hee's hometown, 200,000 people spontaneously came to listen to Kim Dae-jung's speech. In Busan, the number of people who listened to his speech reached 500,000. When Kim Dae-jung gave a speech at Jangchungdam Park in Seoul, the number of listeners reached an unprecedented 1 million. When Park Chung-hee gave a speech at Jangchungdam Park, the number of listeners was only one-third of that of Kim Dae-jung. In addition to obstructing Kim Dae-jung's election activities, the ruling DRP also took various illegal and fraudulent actions in the election to ensure that Park Chung-hee was elected. Even the votes cast by Kim Dae-jung and his wife were declared invalid by the authorities. On 28 April, the Japanese newspaper Asahi Shimbun published a report entitled "Invalid and Illegal". showed that Kim Dae-jung won 44.4% of the vote, losing to Park Chung-hee, who sought re-election through large-scale fraud. At the time, some commentators believed that "if there had been a fair election body to supervise and the votes had been counted correctly, Kim Dae-jung would have been elected president".

One month after the presidential election was the election for the eighth National Assembly. Kim Dae-jung used his popularity among the people to lobby for the New People's Party candidates in various places. Kim's rise made Park Chung-hee feel threatened. Kim was subsequently threatened with death several times. On 25 May 1971, on the highway from Mokpo to Gwangju, Kim was involved in a "car accident" deliberately caused by Park Chung-hee, and three supporters traveling with him died on the spot. Although Kim survived, his hip joint was severely injured, leaving him with a lifelong disability and a limp. On 27 May 1971, the results of the vote for the eighth National Assembly were announced. The ruling Democratic Republican Party won 113 seats, and the New People's Party won 89 seats, far exceeding the legally required number of 65 votes (one-third) to resist the amendment of the constitution. Kim was also elected as a member of the eighth National Assembly. The unexpected victory of the New People's Party dealt a heavy blow to Park Chung-hee's dictatorship.

=== Political prosecution ===
Kim Dae-jung went into exile twice: first from 18 October 1972 to 8 August 1973, then from 23 December 1982 to 8 February 1985. Prior to his exile, Kim had been severely injured following an assassination attempt on 25 May 1971 and traveled to Japan for treatment. After the October Restoration established a military dictatorship under Park Chung-hee, Kim applied for asylum and did not return to South Korea.

During his first exile, Kim lived in Tokyo and toured the United States twice. He publicly opposed the Restoration in Japanese press and lobbied Japanese politicians across the political spectrum in support of democratizing South Korea. He continued this work during his tours of the US, organizing American politicians, Korean expatriates, and the general public to apply pressure on the Park regime. On 8 August 1973, Korean intelligence agents kidnapped Kim outside the Grand Palace Hotel in Tokyo and after failing to drown him, took him to Seoul. The Park administration placed Kim under house arrest after the US government intervened to ensure his survival.

For much of the next nine years, Kim remained under house arrest, and the South Korean government imprisoned him twice and even sentenced him to death. From early March 1976 to 27 December 1978, the Park administration jailed Kim for demanding that Park resign and that the Yushin Constitution he promulgated be abolished. In January 1980, the succeeding military dictatorship under Chun Doo-hwan lifted Kim's house arrest, only to arrest him during Chun's second coup on 17 May 1980. On 11 September 1980, the government sentenced Kim to death; this was eventually commuted to twenty years in prison after the intercessions of Pope John Paul II and the US government.

On 23 December 1982, after a two-week negotiation with Kim and his wife, the South Korean government suddenly and discreetly flew him and his family to Washington, DC. While in exile, Kim leveraged American press and mass media in his fight for democracy and against the military dictatorship. From mid-1983, he conducted related research at the Harvard Center for International Affairs as a visiting fellow. On 8 January 1985, he and his ally Kim Young-sam established the New Democratic Party of Korea. One month later, Kim Dae-jung, accompanied by an entourage of prominent Americans for his safety, returned to South Korea to assist in the legislative elections that year.

=== 1987 presidential election ===
In the mid-1980s, with the rise of student and civil movements in South Korea and South Korea's international commitment to the 1988 Summer Olympic Games, the military government's dictatorship in South Korea had reached its end. (Note: IOC President Juan Antonio Samaranch publicly stated that if riots break out in Seoul, the Olympics will be moved to another location.。) At the end of 1984, Kim Dae-jung prepared to return to South Korea to contribute to the National Assembly elections on 12 February of the following year, but was opposed by the South Korean government. However, under the intervention of the US government, the South Korean government finally had to allow Kim Dae-jung to return to South Korea and promised his personal safety. On 8 February 1985, to prevent a repeat of the assassination of Ninoy Aquino, more than thirty-seven supporters, including Patricia M. Derian, former U.S. Assistant Secretary of State for Human Rights; Congressmen Edward Feighan and Thomas Foglietta; Pharis Harvey; and a number of other prominent Americans accompanied Kim Dae-jung back to South Korea. At Gimpo International Airport, Kim received a warm welcome from more than 300,000 people. After returning home, he was immediately placed under house arrest. Four days after Kim returned to Korea, the election for the 1985 South Korean legislative election had a dramatic result. The New People's Party, which had been established for less than a month, won the election and became the largest opposition party. Following the ruling government's drubbing in the legislative election, Chun lifted the ban on fourteen opposition politicians, excluding Kim Dae-jung.

On 12 February 1986, at the first anniversary meeting of the founding of the New Democratic Party, Kim Dae-jung, Kim Young-sam and the president of the New Democratic Party took the lead in signing a petition to amend the constitution. The petition spread like wildfire throughout the country. On 30 April 1987, Chun Doo-hwan was forced to say under pressure that it was not impossible to amend the constitution during his term. However, on 10 June, the ruling Democratic Justice Party (DJP) held a presidential candidate convention and nominated Roh Tae-woo as the candidate for the 13th presidential election, stubbornly insisting on the indirect election system for the president. This move triggered the largest democratic movement in South Korean history, the June Democracy Movement. To quell it, Roh had no choice but to announce on 29 June that the current constitution would be amended, the president would be elected directly, and Kim Dae-jung would be pardoned. (Note: Roh Tae-woo's pardon of Kim Dae-jung was not only due to pressure, but also to divide the democratic camp, pitting Kim Dae-jung against Kim Young-sam and Kim Jong-pil, splitting the votes and allowing him to benefit from the election.)

==== One Roh against three Kims ====
Although the democratic constitutional reform movement achieved a decisive victory, the democratic camp quickly fell into a dilemma of determining the presidential candidate. Kim Dae-jung said he could join Kim Young-sam's Reunification Democratic Party (RDP), but the two Kims refused to give way on the issue of the presidential candidate. Signs of a split appeared between the two leading figures of the democratic movement, Kim Dae-jung and Kim Young-sam. At the same time, another bigwig in the opposition political world, Kim Jong-pil, reorganized the New Democratic Republican Party (NDRP) on 30 October 1987, and was nominated as the party's presidential candidate. That day, Kim Dae-jung left the RDP and established the Peace Democratic Party (PDP) after negotiations with Kim Young-sam to compete for the presidential candidate of the former party broke down. On 12 November, Kim Dae-jung was elected president of the PDP and presidential candidate. Despite the democratic camp's repeated efforts to ask the two Kims to unite, they were unsuccessful. Finally, the 13th presidential election formed a "one Roh against three Kims" election pattern.

Kim Dae-jung threw himself into the election campaign. To obstruct the opposition's victory, the ruling party again instigated regional conflicts and attempted to divide the democratic camp. At Kim Dae-jung's speaking engagements, the ruling party sent people to chant "Support Kim Young-sam," while at Kim Young-sam's speaking engagements, they chanted "Long live Kim Dae-jung!" Violence even erupted at Kim Dae-jung's speaking engagements, with people throwing stones, bottles, and eggs. Furthermore, the ruling party employed old tactics from the Park Chung-hee era, McCarthyistly accusing Kim Dae-jung of being a "communist sympathizer". At a time when the Iron Curtain had not yet been lifted, this had a significant negative impact on Kim Dae-jung's campaign. On 29 November 1987, the bombing of Korean Air Flight 858 occurred. The suspect, North Korean agent Kim Hyon-hui, was extradited to South Korea the day before the election. This event dealt a fatal blow to Kim Dae-jung's campaign and was particularly advantageous to Roh's camp. Ultimately, due to the rivalry among the "three Kims," all three lost the election. The voting results on 16 December showed that Roh Tae-woo received 8.28 million votes (36.6%), Kim Young-sam received 6.33 million votes (28.0%), and Kim Dae-jung received 6.11 million votes (27.1%). Roh benefited from the election that made him the first democratically elected president of South Korea since Park Chung-hee.

In July 2019, according to American Central Intelligence Agency (CIA) documents obtained by Hong Kong's South China Morning Post through a freedom of information request, the military-backed ruling forces drew up detailed plans to fix the election result in case Roh lost. The documents suggested that the government was prepared to crack down hard on any unrest following the vote, with an Intel briefing stating that an "open arrest order" had been prepared for Kim Dae-jung if he tried to "instigate a popular revolt against the election results". As Roh won the election, the plans were not implemented. Kim was subsequently elected to the National Assembly in 1988 and 1992.

=== 1992 presidential election ===
Although Kim Dae-jung lost the 13th presidential election, his People's Party achieved a major victory in the National Assembly elections, winning 70 seats and becoming the largest opposition party. Kim Young-sam's RDP won 59 seats, becoming the second largest opposition party. Kim Jong-pil's NDRP won 35 seats, becoming the third largest opposition party. The combined seats of the three opposition parties exceeded the 125 seats won by the ruling DJP. This created a situation of "small government, large opposition" in South Korean politics for the first time. At the first session of the 13th National Assembly, Kim Dae-jung returned to the National Assembly podium after 16 years of hardship to deliver a speech. He demanded that the Roh Tae-woo government thoroughly investigate the truth of the Gwangju Uprising and investigate the illegal and corrupt practices of the Chun Doo-hwan government. Under the impetus of the People's Party, the National Assembly used its power of oversight and investigation to establish the "Fifth Republic Hearings." Chun Doo-hwan's corrupt practices were exposed. Under pressure, the Roh Tae-woo government arrested Chun Doo-hwan's family members and close associates suspected of corruption at the end of 1989. Chun Doo-hwan was also forced to attend the National Assembly hearings and apologize to the people. Afterwards, Chun Doo-hwan resigned from all public office, paid 13.9 billion won in political funds, and went into seclusion with his wife at Baekdamsa Temple.

==== Three-party merger ====
The "small government, large opposition" political landscape placed the Roh Tae-woo government in a very passive position. Bills and proposals put forward by the ruling party faced joint resistance from the three major opposition parties in the National Assembly, plunging the Roh government into a serious political crisis. However, the three major opposition parties did not hold a two-thirds majority in the National Assembly, thus preventing them from passing their own bills. To break this deadlock, Roh Tae-woo sought a coalition government with one or two powerful opposition parties. He first courted Kim Jong-pil, who shared many commonalities with the former Park Chung-hee regime, and later recruited Kim Young-sam. On 9 February 1990, the DJP, the RDP, and the NDRP officially merged to form the Democratic Liberal Party (DLP), with Roh Tae-woo elected as its president and Kim Young-sam and Kim Jong-pil elected as Supreme Council members. Through the merger of the three parties, Roh Tae-woo successfully divided and consolidated the opposition political forces, giving the ruling party significantly more seats in the National Assembly than required for constitutional amendments, ending the "small government, large opposition" situation. Subsequently, the ruling Democratic Liberal Party used its absolute majority in the National Assembly to force through a series of controversial bills. The merger of the three parties caused a great shock in South Korea. Kim Young-sam, the former opposition leader of democracy, was actually merged into the ruling party of the successor to the dictatorship. Kim Dae-jung severely criticized this. In July, 80 opposition Democratic Party members resigned en masse to protest the dictatorship of the ruling party. On 8 October, Kim Dae-jung began a hunger strike to resist the dictatorship, and later 30 members of the People's Party joined his hunger strike. Anti-government student movements also continued one after another.

On the other hand, the merger of the three parties did not proceed as smoothly as Roh Tae-woo had envisioned. Roh attempted to absorb Kim Young-sam's original democratic forces. However, Kim Young-sam and Roh Tae-woo's forces were originally two parties of different natures, and although merged, they remained irreconcilable. Just when Kim Young-sam was in his most difficult situation, his old ally Kim Dae-jung once again came to his aid. On 24 March 1992, in the 14th National Assembly election in South Korea, Kim Dae-jung's People's Party gained 20 more seats than the previous election, achieving a landslide victory, while the ruling Democratic Liberal Party only won 148 seats, failing to reach the two-thirds majority required for constitutional amendment. With his prestige greatly enhanced, Kim Dae-jung was bound to run for the next presidential election, and within the Democratic Liberal Party, no one except Kim Young-sam could rival him. In order to maintain the Democratic Liberal Party's ruling position, it had no choice but to elect Kim Young-sam as its presidential candidate. In August 1992, Kim Young-sam took over the position of president of the Democratic Liberal Party from Roh Tae-woo.

==== Withdrawal from politics ====
In December 1992, Kim Young-sam and Kim Dae-jung ran for president in South Korea's presidential election as candidates for the ruling Democratic Liberal Party and the opposition People's Party, respectively. The election was extremely competitive. The ruling party resorted to old tactics from the Park Chung-hee era, spreading rumors and slanders against Kim Dae-jung, accusing him of "cooperating with the Communists". On 6 October 1992, before the election, the government disclosed the "Ri Son-sil spy network incident," which caused a huge uproar in South Korea. North Korean spy Ri Son-sil had infiltrated South Korea three times, infiltrating various South Korean organizations and establishing a South Korean branch of the Workers' Party of Korea. The ruling party spread rumors that Ri had visited Kim Dae-jung's home and even posed for a photo with Kim's wife. The National Security Planning Department spread rumors that "Chairman Kim Il-sung of the North called on voters in the South to support candidate Kim Dae-jung in this election." In addition, the ruling party incited regional sentiments among voters, putting Kim Dae-jung at a disadvantage in the election. Kim Dae-jung lost all his constituencies except Seoul and Honam. On 19 December 1992, Kim Young-sam was elected in the 14th presidential election of South Korea with the support of the ruling Democratic Liberal Party, becoming the first civilian president of South Korea since Park Chung-hee.

The defeat in this presidential election dealt a heavy blow to Kim Dae-jung. Kim Dae-jung, now in his seventies, reviewed his arduous and tortuous political career over the past forty years and decided to resign from his position as a member of the National Assembly the day after the election, thus retiring from politics. The South Korean media gave extensive coverage to Kim Dae-jung's retirement. The media's cold suppression of Kim Dae-jung during the election period turned overnight into a hero-like adoration and retrospective of him as a "political giant", a "political pillar", and "a figure who has appeared in the 40 years of democratization".

On 26 January 1993, Kim Dae-jung accepted an invitation from the University of Cambridge to study in England as a research fellow. His research topic was the reunification of Germany and the integration of Europe. During his studies in Europe, Kim Dae-jung visited Germany several times to study the reunification of Germany and to refine and expand his "three-stage unification theory". Prior to this, he and his wife also made a special trip to The Hague, Netherlands, to pay respects at the grave of Yi Chun, a Korean special envoy to The Hague. During his time in Cambridge, Kim Dae-jung met renowned Cambridge scholars such as astrophysicist Stephen Hawking, sociologist Anthony Giddens, and political theorist John Dunn. Kim and Hawking had met previously in 1991 during the latter's visit to South Korea at a banquet Kim attended at the invitation of the British Ambassador to Korea. In Cambridge, Kim Dae-jung was Hawking's neighbor and was deeply inspired by his perseverance. (Note: In August 2000, after Hawking accepted an invitation to attend the COSMO-2000 conference in Korea, Kim received him in the Cheong Wa Dae.) During his studies in England, Kim Dae-jung also wrote his autobiographical essay, "For a New Beginning". At the end of June 1993, Kim Dae-jung finished his studies at Cambridge University and returned to South Korea.

== Return to politics ==
On 27 January 1994, Kim Dae-jung and Corazon Aquino, the widow of Ninoy Aquino and the first female president of the Philippines, founded the Asia-Pacific Peace Foundation. Kim Dae-jung and Corazon Aquino served as co-chairpersons of the foundation. On 10 December 1993, Kim Dae-jung, as a representative of South Korea, attended the inaugural meeting of the International Conference on Asian Democracy and Human Rights in Bangkok, Thailand, and delivered a speech, once again attracting the attention of the world as a symbol of democracy. In May 1994, when North Korea's nuclear weapons became the focus of the world's attention, Kim Dae-jung visited the United States. He delivered a speech at the National Press Club, calling on North Korea to disclose the true situation of its nuclear energy development, and at the same time urging the United States to establish diplomatic relations with North Korea and resolve North Korea's nuclear weapons issue with a package plan. Under Kim Dae-jung's mediation, US President Bill Clinton sent former President Jimmy Carter to North Korea to meet with Kim Il sung to discuss North Korea's nuclear weapons, and the meeting was successful. In November, Kim Dae-jung also visited mainland China and met with Li Ruihuan, the Chairman of the National Committee of the Chinese People's Political Consultative Conference.

After Kim Dae-jung withdrew from politics, the opposition Democratic Party became weak and powerless, and could only cater to the government and the ruling party, and could not play the role that the opposition party should play. Some members of parliament and members of the Democratic Party hoped that Kim could make a comeback. Kim could not ignore this situation. In June 1995, in the first local council and local government elections in South Korea in thirty years, the Democratic Party supported by Kim defeated the ruling DLP. Kim Dae-jung believed that the time was right and announced his return to politics on 18 July 1995, to revitalize the opposition party in order to restrain the one-party rule structure. On 5 September, Kim Dae-jung formed a new political party, the National Assembly of New Politics, and served as its president. In the 1996 National Assembly elections, the National Assembly became the largest opposition party in South Korea.

=== 1997 presidential election ===
In preparation for the 1997 presidential election, the National Congress for New Politics led by Kim Dae-jung formed an alliance with the DLP led by Kim Jong-pil. In December 1997, Kim Dae-jung ran for the presidency of South Korea for the fourth time as the joint presidential candidate of both parties, competing against Lee Hoi-chang, the presidential candidate of the ruling Grand National Party, and Lee In-je, who ran independently after leaving the ruling party. During the campaign, Kim Dae-jung put forward the campaign platform of "Towards the 21st century, towards a new politics of unification", and put forward the "regional change theory" based on the public's dissatisfaction with the ruling party and the status quo. At the same time, Kim Dae-jung made full use of the dissatisfaction over the handling of the 1997 Asian financial crisis by the ruling party to vigorously establish a new image of "economic president" and "president who is ready". Initially trailing heavily in the polls and seen by some as a perennial candidate, his situation became favorable when the public revolted against the incumbent conservative Kim Young-sam government in the wake of the nation's economic collapse in the Asian financial crisis just weeks before the election.

In the election held on 18 December 1997, at the age of 73, Kim Dae-jung, with more than 40 years of political experience, defeated his long-time opponents and was elected as the 15th president of South Korea. His election victory at that time was the closest ever, where a split in the ruling conservative party led to separate candidacies of Lee Hoi-chang and Lee In-je, and both achieved 38.7% and 19.2% of the vote respectively, enabling Kim to win with only 40.3% of the popular vote or by a margin of 390,000 votes of 26 million over his opponent, Lee Hoi-chang. Lee was a former Supreme Court Justice and Prime Minister who had graduated at the top of his class from the Seoul National University School of Law and was widely viewed as politically inexperienced, elitist, and his inept handling of charges that his sons had dodged the mandatory military service further damaged his campaign.

Kim, in contrast, had an outsider image which suited the anti-establishment mood and developed a strategy to use the media effectively in his campaign. In 1997, the "North Winds" scandal involved lawmakers of Lee's party, who met North Korean agents in Beijing, who agreed to instigate, in exchange for bribes, a skirmish on the DMZ right before the presidential election to try to cause a panic that would hamper Kim's campaign due to his dovish stand on North Korea. Lee's colleagues were later prosecuted. Ex-presidents Park Chung Hee, Chun Doo-hwan, Roh Tae-woo, and Kim Young-sam hailed from the Gyeongsang Province region, which became wealthier since 1945 partly because of the policies of Park, Chun, and Roh's regimes. Kim Dae-jung was the first president who came from the southwestern Jeolla region to serve a full term, an area that had been neglected and less developed partly because of the previous presidents' discriminatory policies.

=== Transition period as president-elect ===
Two days after the election, outgoing president Kim Young-sam and the president-elect Kim Dae-jung met and formed a joint 12-member Emergency Economic Committee (ECC), made up of six members each from the outgoing and incoming governments but effectively under the president-elect's control, serving as the de facto economic cabinet until Kim Dae-jung would assume office two months later on 25 February 1998. This meant that Kim effectively had taken charge of making economic decisions during this period even before he took office.

The president-elect's coalition and the majority Grand National Party of the outgoing president also agreed to convene a special session of the National Assembly to deal with a series of thirteen financial reform bills required under both the original IMF program and its 24 December revised deal. This transition period saw important financial reform legislation being passed into law, that had been stalled under the outgoing government. The president-elect cooperated with the outgoing government and ruling party to get legislative backing for several important reform measures. In particular, the delegation of substantial powers to the newly created Financial Supervisory Commission (FSC) greatly enhanced the government's powers to rein in the chaebols who were caught up in the crisis.

As president-elect, Kim Dae-jung also advised outgoing president Kim Young-sam to pardon two former presidents who were both imprisoned in 1996 for corruption, treason and insurrection, Chun Doo-hwan (who had Kim sentenced to death) and Roh Tae-woo (Chun's second-in-command), in the spirit of national unity.

== Presidency (1998–2003) ==
The swearing-in of Kim Dae-jung as the eighth president of South Korea on 25 February 1998 marked the first time in Korean history that the ruling party peacefully transferred power to a democratically elected opposition candidate. In his inaugural address, Kim characterized his administration as a "government of the people".

Kim was elected when the 1997 Asian financial crisis hit South Korea hard, and he was "appointed in a time of crisis". In December 1997, shortly after being elected president, Kim Dae-jung consulted with Kim Young-sam to pardon Chun Doo-hwan and Roh Tae-woo, two old enemies who were imprisoned for corruption, and affirmed their contributions to the economic development of South Korea. Kim Dae-jung hoped to use this move to unite all parties in South Korea to deal with the financial crisis together. He advocated reforming the laws and systems that lead to corruption. Kim adhered to the national view of "unity of the people" and opposed narrow party and regional concepts. Under the IMF system, Kim Dae-jung coordinated the departments of all parties in South Korea to carry out sweeping reforms in the four areas of enterprises, finance, public utilities and labor employment. In order to overcome the foreign exchange crisis, Kim and his wife responded to the "gold donation campaign" launched by the Korean people and donated their treasured gold jewelry.

Kim also personally advertised Korean tourism with the HOT group. This was not only the first time in Korean history that a head of state personally filmed an advertisement for the tourism industry, but it was also an unprecedented situation in the international community. Under Kim's leadership, after the Korean economy shrank by 7% in 1998, it grew rapidly by 9.5% in 1999. His reforms not only enabled Korea to get out of the financial crisis in a relatively short period of time, but also transformed the Korean economy from a low-end product export-oriented economy to an information high-tech economy. The reforms also laid a good foundation for Korea's future economic development and enhanced Korea's ability to resist global financial crises such as the 2008 global financial crisis. Kim was therefore recognized by the international community as an "excellent student" in overcoming the financial crisis.

Kim's "Great Unity" national view is also reflected in his advocacy of national and ethnic unity. After taking office, Kim actively promoted reconciliation between the North and South and successfully held the first inter-Korean summit with North Korean leader Kim Jong Il, "bringing sunshine and warmth to the last Cold War region in the global village". In terms of foreign policy with the United States, Japan, China and Russia, Kim implemented "four-power coordination diplomacy", which promoted peace and stability on the Korean Peninsula and enhanced South Korea's international status and influence by strengthening the South Korea-US alliance, improving relations with Japan, China and Russia.

Kim's governing philosophy is the coordinated development of democratic system, market economy and social welfare. To this end, he abandoned the bureaucratic authoritarian system, reformed the chaebol economy and supported the development of small and medium-sized enterprises. He believed that cultivating a strong middle class and civil society is the prerequisite for the modernization of Korean politics. In June 1999, Kim was selected as one of the "50 Leaders Leading Reforms in Asia" by BusinessWeek.

== Post-presidency ==
According to South Korean political tradition, the president does not participate in politics after leaving office. Kim Dae-jung also said in his farewell speech that he hoped to live a peaceful life after leaving office. However, Kim Dae-jung's later years after leaving office were not peaceful. Kim Dae-jung's second son, Kim Hong-yeop, and third son, Kim Hong-geol, were arrested and sentenced for bribery at the end of his term, and his eldest son, Kim Hong-il, a member of the National Assembly of the Democratic Party, was also prosecuted for suspected bribery shortly after he left office. In addition, Kim Dae-jung's Sunshine Policy was severely criticized by the conservative forces in South Korea and was even ridiculed as a "pay-back policy". On 15 March 2003, Roh Moo-hyun announced a special bill on the "North Korea remittance incident". Kim Dae-jung believed that "this issue should not be subject to judicial review" and was willing to take full responsibility. Kim Dae-jung explained the "remittance incident to North Korea" in his autobiography as follows: "When a rich brother visits a poor brother, how can he go empty-handed? But the government directly provides aid to North Korea, which is indeed a legal problem. I had to provide aid to North Korea through the Hyundai Group." At that time, apart from one member who supported the investigation, the other members of the South Korean State Council also opposed Roh Moo-hyun's approach. However, under Roh Moo-hyun's insistence, the "special investigation" conducted a thorough investigation of banks, companies and government personnel. The core figures of Kim Dae-jung's government, former Minister of Unification Lim Dong- won, former Chief of Staff of the President Park Ji-won and former Chief Secretary for Economic Affairs of the President Lee Ki-ho, were arrested and prosecuted one after another. Chung Mong -hun, then chairman of the Hyundai Group, committed suicide by jumping off a building in his office, which brought a huge shock to South Korean society.

On 29 January 2004, Kim Dae-jung attended the retrial of the "Kim Dae-jung internal strife conspiracy incident," and was acquitted of the death sentence he had been sentenced to more than 23 years earlier. On 24 September, the Seoul High Court ruled that the South Korean government should pay Kim Dae-jung 94.9 million won in reparations for the economic and mental losses he suffered from being wrongfully imprisoned from 18 May 1980 to 22 November 1982.

After stepping down, Kim Dae-jung received numerous invitations to visit from countries around the world. On 10 May 2004, Kim Dae-jung visited France, Norway and Switzerland at the invitation of the European Union. This was his first overseas trip after stepping down. During this trip to the three European countries, he delivered keynote speeches at the "2004 OECD Forum" held in France, the Nobel Institute in Oslo, Norway and the "57th World Health Assembly" held in Geneva, Switzerland. On 29 June, Kim Dae-jung visited China at the invitation of the General Secretary of the Chinese Communist Party (CCP) Hu Jintao and Jiang Zemin, then Chairman of the Central Military Commission of the CCP. On 6 November, Kim Dae-jung also visited Sweden and Rome, Italy at the invitation of the Swedish Prime Minister and the Mayor of Rome. On 12 May 2007, Kim Dae-jung was awarded the first "Freedom Prize" by the Free University of Berlin and visited Germany. On 17 September, Kim Dae-jung visited Washington and New York at the invitation of former US President Clinton. During his visit, Kim Dae-jung also held talks with UN Secretary-General Ban Ki-moon, former US Secretaries of State Kissinger, Albright, Powell, and former US Treasury Secretary (President of Citibank) Robert Rubin.

In 2005, on the fifth anniversary of Kim Dae-jung's Nobel Peace Prize, Kim Dae-jung invited former German President Richard von Weizsäcker and his wife to visit South Korea. Kim Dae-jung and Weizsäcker held a special dialogue entitled "The Experience of German Reunification and the Korean Peninsula". The special dialogue was chaired by Professor Han Sang-jin of Seoul National University. KBS broadcast the dialogue at the end of the year. On 14 June 2006, Kim Dae -jung attended the opening ceremony of the National Reunification Grand Ceremony on the sixth anniversary of the publication of the North-South Joint Declaration at the Gwangju World Cup Football Stadium. The next day, Kim Dae-jung attended the Gwangju Conference of Nobel Prize laureates. This was the first time the conference had been held outside of Rome since it was first held in 1999.

=== Lee Myung-bak administration ===
In April 2008, Kim Dae-jung visited Portland and Boston in the United States. On the 20th, he gave a speech entitled "Sunshine Policy is the Road to Success" at the Kennedy School of Harvard University. In September, Kim Dae-jung attended the "Nobel Peace Prize" summit held in Stavanger, Norway, and gave a speech entitled "The Power of Dialogue - Mutualism Dialogue with Common Interests as the Goal". On 26 October, Kim Dae-jung was invited to attend the "Northeast Asia Regional Development and Cooperation Forum" held in Shenyang. Afterwards, he visited Dandong City, which is separated from the Korean Peninsula by a river. On 4 May 2009, Kim Dae-jung visited China again at the invitation of the Foreign Affairs College and met with Xi Jinping, then Vice President of China, at the Great Hall of the People.

Roh Moo-hyun, who succeeded Kim Dae-jung as president, held him in high esteem. Although their relationship was sometimes tense, it was very close. On 23 May 2009, when Kim Dae-jung learned of Roh Moo-hyun's suicide, he said, "It feels like half of my body has collapsed." On 28 May, when Kim Dae-jung and his wife paid their respects to Roh Moo-hyun at the Seoul Station funeral parlor in a wheelchair, Kim Dae-jung said, "If I were subjected to the same insults, setbacks, and despair as former President Roh Moo-hyun, I would probably make the same choice.. That's how the world is; sometimes it's cloudy, but sometimes it's sunny. If even brave people can't bear it, how can it be. The prosecution investigated Roh Moo-hyun, including himself, his wife, and all his relatives without missing a single one, but until Roh Moo-hyun's death, the prosecution still couldn't produce any conclusive evidence." At the funeral service held the next day, Kim Dae-jung held the hand of Roh Moo-hyun's widow, Kwon Yang-sook, and wept bitterly. He also told reporters that he had intended to deliver a eulogy at the funeral service, but the government prevented him from doing so. At the ninth anniversary of the 15 June North-South Joint Declaration, Kim Dae-jung said that he and Roh Moo-hyun were "like brothers in a previous life" and accused the current government of being a "dictatorship".

== Illness and death ==
Kim Dae-jung's health deteriorated after he left office. In 2003, he underwent coronary artery dilation surgery and had to undergo kidney hemodialysis three times a week after the surgery. In 2005, he was hospitalized twice for pulmonary edema and was frequently in and out of the hospital afterward. By early 2009, his health was already very poor, and he could only attend Roh Moo-hyun's funeral ceremony in a wheelchair. There was even an ambulance on standby at the scene in case of emergency.

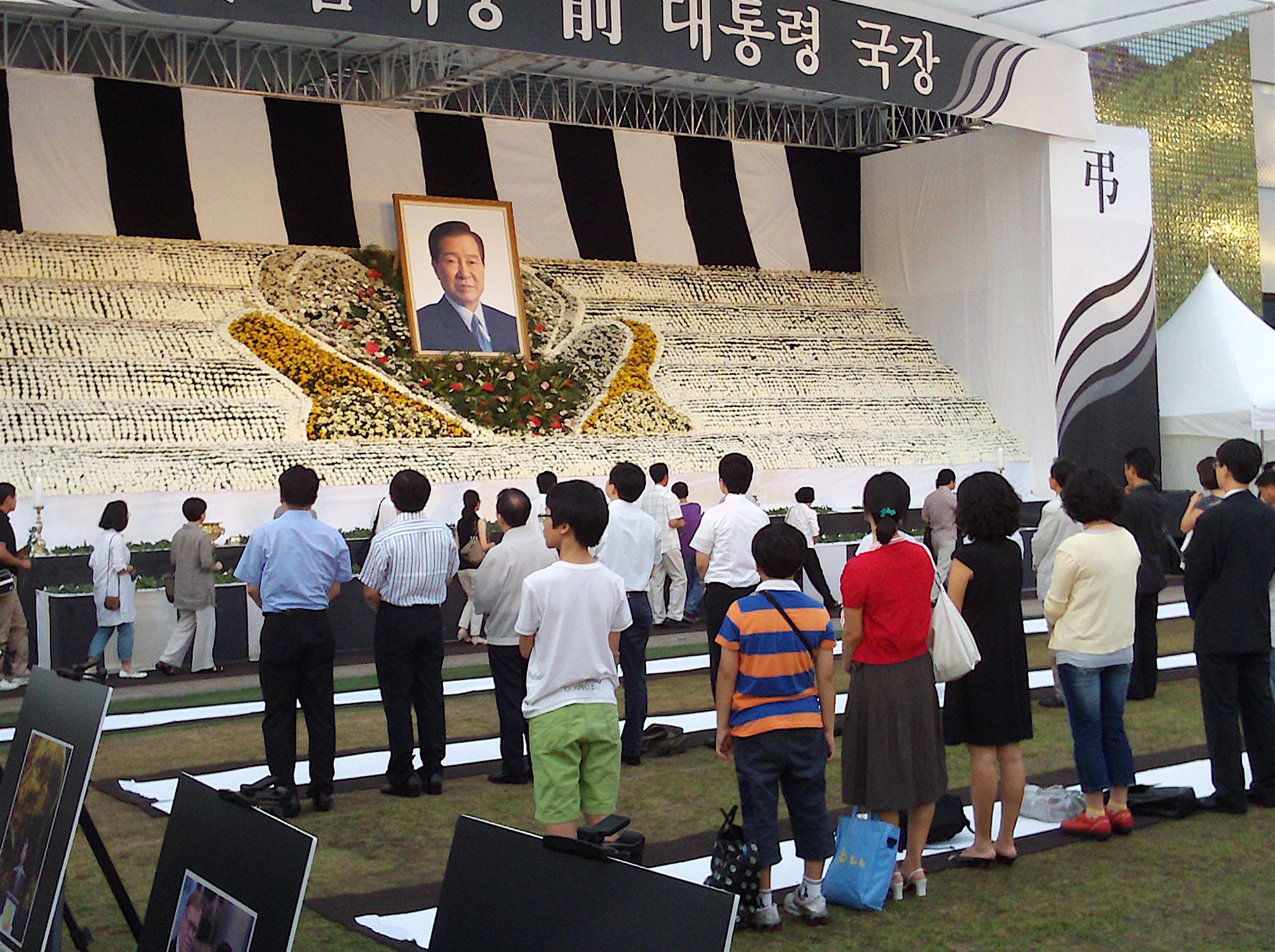
A roadside memorial for Kim Dae-jung

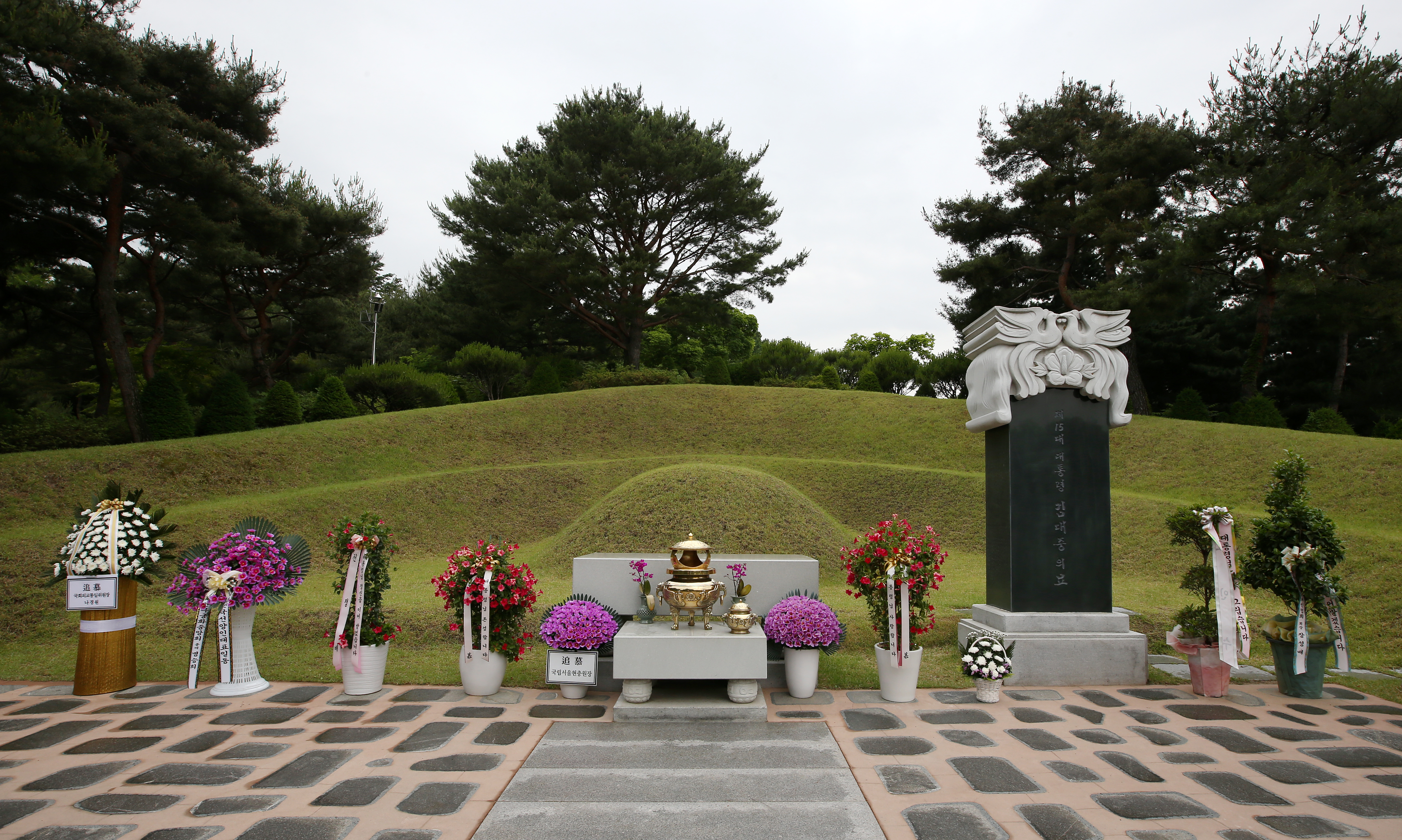
Tomb of President Kim Dae-jung in Seoul National Cemetery

Kim died on 18 August 2009, at 13:43 KST, at Severance Hospital of Yonsei University in Seoul aged 85 years old, three months after his successor Roh Moo-hyun. He was first admitted to hospital suffering from pneumonia on 13 July. The cause of death was cardiac arrest caused by multiple organ dysfunction syndrome. An interfaith state funeral was held for him on 23 August 2009, in front of the National Assembly Building, with a procession leading to the Seoul National Cemetery where he was interred according to Catholic traditions, near former presidents Syngman Rhee and Park Chung Hee. He is the second person in South Korean history to be given a state funeral after Park Chung Hee. It was attended by President Lee Myung-bak, First Lady Kim Yoon-ok, former presidents Chun Doo-hwan, Kim Young-sam, former first Lady Kwon Yang-sook, and members of National Assembly. However, former President Roh Tae-woo and former Prime Minister Kim Jong-pil were absent. North Korea sent a delegation to his funeral.

=== Commemoration ===
The day after Kim Dae-jung's death, in consideration of his great contributions to the country and the nation, the Lee Myung-bak government decided to hold a six-day state funeral for him. During the state funeral, the national flag was flown at half-mast throughout South Korea. This was the first state funeral held in South Korea in thirty years since the state funeral held for Park Chung-hee after his assassination in 1979, and it was also the first state funeral held for a former president. The funeral committee consisted of 2,371 people from the political, educational, religious and economic circles of South Korea, as well as relatives recommended by the bereaved family. It was the largest state funeral in South Korean history. The chairman of the funeral committee was Han Seung-soo, the then Prime Minister of South Korea.

At 2 p.m. on 23 August 2009, Kim Dae-jung's funeral was held in the front yard of the National Assembly of South Korea. More than 30,000 people attended, including Kim Dae-jung's widow Lee Hee-ho and other relatives, South Korean President Lee Myung-bak and his wife Kim Yoon-ok, former President Kim Young-sam, ambassadors and representatives from various countries to South Korea, and South Korean citizens. Former Chinese State Councilor Tang Jiaxuan, former US Secretary of State Madeleine Albright, and former Speaker of the House of Representatives of Japan Kono Yohei, and other dignitaries from various countries came to pay their respects on behalf of their respective governments. Kim Jong-il, General Secretary of the Workers' Party of Korea, sent a telegram of condolence to Kim Dae-jung's family after Kim Dae-jung's death. On 21 August, a North Korean delegation led by Kim Ki-nam, Secretary of the Central Committee of the Workers' Party of Korea, paid their respects at Kim Dae-jung's funeral hall and offered condolences to Kim Dae-jung's family. The funeral lasted about ninety minutes. In his eulogy, Prime Minister Han Seung-soo said, "His Excellency the President dedicated his life to democracy, human rights, peace and national reconciliation. His legacy will be remembered forever as part of our glorious history." After the funeral, Kim Dae-jung's coffin was moved to the Seoul National Cemetery for burial. The hearse passed by landmarks in the city, including the Yeouido Democratic Party headquarters, the Donggyo-dong private residence (which has been expanded into the "Kim Dae-jung Peace Center"), Gwanghwamun Sejong Crossing, Seoul Plaza, and Seoul Station. Hundreds of thousands of people lined the streets to bid farewell to Kim Dae-jung, creating a very moving scene.

=== Other ===
In February 2003, Yonsei University converted the headquarters building of the Asia Pacific Peace Foundation, donated by Kim Dae-jung, into the Kim Dae-jung Library. This is the first presidential library in South Korea. The library is managed by the Institute for Unification Studies at Yonsei University. The library houses the Nobel Peace Prize medals won by Kim Dae-jung, photos of Kim Dae-jung, his personal belongings, and tens of thousands of books donated by Kim Dae-jung, related to Kim Dae-jung, and books on the unification of the Korean Peninsula added by Yonsei University.

The Kim Dae-jung Memorial Hall has been built in Mokpo, Kim Dae-jung's hometown. A bronze statue of Kim Dae-jung stands in front of the library of Mokpo First High School, Kim Dae-jung's alma mater. The Kim Dae-jung Conference Center in Gwangju Metropolitan City, South Korea, and the Kim Dae-jung Bridge connecting Sinan County and Muan County in Jeollanam-do are named after Kim Dae-jung.

In August 2010, on the first anniversary of Kim Dae-jung's death, the Korean Three People Publishing House published Kim Dae-jung's Autobiography, which had a great impact in South Korea. As soon as the book was released, 80,000 copies were sold out. Japan's NHK television station once filmed a documentary entitled "Kim Dae-jung's Autobiography Dedicated to the Japanese People" during Kim Dae-jung's lifetime. The film achieved the second highest viewership rating for a documentary since the establishment of NHK. In 2002, the film KT, which was co-produced by Japan and South Korea and was about the kidnapping of Kim Dae-jung, was nominated for the Golden Bear Award at the Berlin International Film Festival.

== Family ==
Kim Dae-jung's first wife was Cha Yong-ae. The two married on 9 April 1945, and had two sons, Kim Hong-il and Kim Hong-yeop. Kim Dae-jung's second wife was Lee Hee-ho. The two married on 10 May 1962, two years after Cha Yong-ae's death, and had one son, Kim Hong-jae. During Kim Dae-jung's imprisonment for opposing the dictatorship, his eldest son, Kim Hong-il, was arrested and tortured by the authorities, and his waist was injured; his second son, Kim Hong-yeop, was detained and interrogated by the authorities; and his youngest son, Kim Hong-jae, was still in high school at the time and was spared persecution. All three of Kim Dae-jung's sons were sentenced for bribery, and two of them were arrested. Kim Dae-jung apologized to the nation five times for this, and on 6 May 2002, he announced his withdrawal from the ruling New Millennium Democratic Party.

- Kim Hong-il, the eldest son, was a former member of the National Assembly of South Korea. In 2006, he was sentenced to two years in prison, suspended for three years, for bribery. He was also removed from his position as a member of parliament. Kim Hong-il suffers from Parkinson's disease. Some believe that his illness is a sequela of the severe torture he suffered at the hands of the authorities in the 1980s. Because of his physical limitations, Kim Hong-il was exempted from detention.
- The second son, Kim Hong-yeop, was the vice chairman of the Asia-Pacific Peace Foundation. In 2003, he was sentenced to two years in prison and fined 660 million won for bribery and tax evasion. He was pardoned in August 2005. In April 2007, Kim Hong-yeop was re-elected as a member of the National Assembly in a by-election, but lost the election in the 2008 National Assembly election.
- The third son, Kim Hong-jae, studied at the University of Southern California and later worked as a researcher at the Pacific Institute of Pomona University. In 2002, Kim Hong-jae was sentenced to two years in prison, suspended for three years, and fined 200 million won for bribery and tax evasion. In August 2005, on the 60th anniversary of Korea's liberation, Kim Hong-jae was pardoned by the South Korean government.

== Legacy ==
On his 85th birthday, Kim Dae-jung wrote in his diary how he evaluated his life:

Looking back, it was a magnificent life. A life dedicated to the struggle for democracy, a life devoted to saving the economy and opening the path to North-South reconciliation. Although my life was not perfect, I have no regrets.

During his presidency, he introduced South Korea's contemporary welfare state, successfully shepherded the country's economic recovery, brought in a new era of competitive and transparent economy and fostered a greater role for South Korea in the world stage, including the FIFA World Cup, jointly hosted by South Korea and Japan in 2002. South Korea also became more democratic as a society, wired to the Internet, and based on a knowledge-intensive infrastructure. A presidential library at Yonsei University was built to preserve Kim's legacy, and there is a convention center named after him in the city of Gwangju, the Kim Dae-jung Convention Center.

Kim Dae-jung spent most of his life fighting for democracy in South Korea. For this, he was imprisoned several times, spent six years in prison, went into exile twice, and faced death threats five times. In February 1998, Kim Dae-jung entered the Blue House and successfully achieved the first peaceful transfer of power between the ruling and opposition parties in the constitutional history of South Korea. Many South Koreans believe that after Park Chung-hee led the industrialization process of South Korea, Kim Dae-jung led the democratization of South Korean society. Some South Korean scholars believe that with the passing of Kim Dae-jung, South Korean society has bid farewell to the "first stage of modernization". After Kim Dae-jung's death, then-South Korean President Lee Myung-bak praised him as "a tireless fighter for democracy in his career". The Times Weekly said: "For eighty-five years, from the poor to the president, Kim Dae-jung illuminated the night sky of South Korea with his life story, reflecting the transformation of South Korea from autocracy to democracy." The New York Times called him "the Asian Mandela". The Japanese newspaper Asahi Shimbun called Kim Dae-jung's departure the end of the "era of giants" in South Korean politics and believed that he would be more remembered in history than any previous South Korean president.

At the beginning of Kim Dae-jung's term, the Asian financial crisis swept through South Korea. Through reforms in four major areas—business, finance, public sector, and labor-management—Kim Dae-jung led the South Korean people to overcome the crisis in a very short time and realized the transformation of the South Korean economy from exporting low-end products to a high-tech economy centered on information. Kim Dae-jung was widely recognized by the international community in this regard. A public opinion poll conducted by the Dong-A Ilbo on Kim Dae-jung's five-year performance at the time of his resignation showed that overcoming the financial crisis was recognized by the South Korean people as Kim Dae-jung's greatest achievement.

Kim Dae-jung is a pioneer of reconciliation on the Korean Peninsula. As early as the 1970s, when the Cold War between East and West and the confrontation between North and South Korea were tense, he proposed a plan for the unification of the Korean Peninsula with great courage. In 1997, after Kim Dae-jung became President of South Korea, he implemented the Sunshine Policy, which promoted the improvement of relations between North and South Korea and the easing of the situation on the peninsula. In June 2000, Kim Dae-jung and Kim Jong-il held the first inter-Korean summit in Pyongyang and issued the North-South Joint Declaration. During the five years of Kim Dae-jung's administration, exchanges and cooperation between North and South Korea on the Korean Peninsula have achieved visible improvement and development. In 2000, Kim Dae-jung was awarded the Nobel Peace Prize for his contributions to the peaceful development of the Korean Peninsula.

During Kim Dae-jung's administration, South Korea successfully hosted the 1999 Asian Winter Games, the Third Asia-Europe Summit, the 2002 FIFA World Cup and the 2002 Asian Games, which effectively enhanced South Korea's international status and prestige and improved relations with neighboring countries. The achievements of Kim Dae-jung's administration, such as enterprise privatization, improvement of the national annual salary system, improvement of women's status, improvement of the medical and health care system, reform of the tax system and stabilization of housing prices, have also been well received by the South Korean people. A Gallup Korea poll in October 2021 showed Kim, Roh Moo-hyun, and Park Chung Hee as the most highly rated presidents of South Korean history in terms of leaving a positive legacy. However, compared to Roh and Park, Kim attracted an absolute majority of positive opinions amongst all age groups, with the highest support among citizens in the 40-49 age range.

A poll showed that 33% of people believed that the failure to combat corruption and the improper appointment of personnel were the biggest mistakes during Kim Dae-jung's administration. Kim Dae-jung took office with a strong anti-corruption campaign. From September 1999 to June 2000, the Kim Dae-jung government investigated 2,246 suspected corrupt officials and detained 810. In a report released by the U.S. Department of Commerce in 2000 on the implementation of the OECD Protocol on the Prevention of Bribery, the Kim Dae-jung government's anti-corruption efforts were highly praised, and South Korea was called one of the model member countries. During his administration, Kim Dae-jung advocated preventing corruption at its source by reforming regulations and systems. In 2001, after six years of preparation, the National Assembly of South Korea passed the Corruption Prevention Act, which further expanded the scope of those who register and disclose property, strengthened the review of property disclosure, and enhanced the independence of the judiciary. Kim Dae-jung himself was also honest and incorruptible throughout his life. According to Yonhap News Agency, Kim Dae-jung's estate was only 1.2 billion won after his death. Kim Dae-jung had strongly criticized the case of former President Kim Young-sam's son being imprisoned for bribery. However, during Kim Dae-jung's term, his three sons were prosecuted or arrested for suspected bribery or tax evasion. This can be said to be the "greatest tragedy in the later years" of this anti-corruption president. Before leaving office, Kim Dae-jung also publicly stated that his biggest regret during his five years in office was that he had not disciplined his children well. In addition, many high-ranking officials in Kim Dae-jung's government were also prosecuted for corruption. The fact that Kim Dae-jung's confidants transferred money to North Korea through the Hyundai Group before the first inter-Korean summit also led to criticism of Kim Dae-jung's Sunshine Policy.

== In popular culture ==
- Portrayed by Hwang In-shik in the 1989 MBC TV series The Second Republic.
- Portrayed by Baek Yoon-sik in the 1993 MBC TV series The Third Republic.
- Portrayed by Choi Min-sik in the 1995 MBC TV series The Fourth Republic.
- Portrayed by Min-wook in the 1995 SBS TV series Koreagate.
- Portrayed by Yu In-chon in the 1998 SBS TV series The Three Kims Period.
- Portrayed by Han Yeong-su in the 2002–2003 SBS TV series Rustic Period.
- Portrayed by Kim In-mun in the 2002 film Fun Movie.
- Portrayed by Choi Il-hwa in the 2002 film KT.
- Portrayed by Song Yang-gyu in the 2003 film Dying or Live) inspired the character under the name Pizza restaurant owner.
- Portrayed by Kim Dong-seok in the 2004–2005 MBC TV series The Age of Heroes.
- Portrayed by Lim Dong-jin in the 2005 MBC TV series 5th Republic.
- Voiced by Lee Cheol-yong (2008) and Kim Myung-soo in the MBC Standard FM radio drama 50 Years of Turbulence).
- Inspired the character Kim Woom-beom portrayed by Sul Kyung-gu in the 2022 film Kingmaker.

== Electoral record ==
Year	Election	Constituency	Political party	No. of votes	%	Results
1954	3rd National Assembly General Election	Mokpo City (South Jeolla)	Independent	3,391	9.98%	Defeated (5th)
1959	1959 parliamentary by-election	Inje County (Gangwon)	Democratic Party	8,483	28.13%	Defeated (2nd)
1960	5th National Assembly General Election	Inje County (Gangwon)	Democratic Party	6,538	30.98%	Defeated (2nd)
1961	1961 parliamentary by-election	Inje County (Gangwon)	Democratic Party	7,698	36.50%	Won
1963	6th National Assembly General Election	Mokpo City (South Jeolla)	Democratic Party	22,513	56.10%	Won
1967	7th National Assembly General Election	Mokpo City (South Jeolla)	New Democratic Party	29,279	56.28%	Won
1971	1971 Presidential Election	South Korea	New Democratic Party	5,395,900	45.25%	Defeated (2nd)
1971	8th National Assembly General Election	National (2nd)	New Democratic Party	4,969,050	44.28%	Elected
1987	1987 Presidential Election	South Korea	Peace Democratic Party	6,113,375	27.04%	Defeated (3rd)
1988	13th National Assembly General Election	National (11st)	Peace Democratic Party	3,783,279	19.26%	Elected
1992	14th National Assembly General Election	National (1st)	Democratic Party	6,004,578	29.17%	Elected
1992	1992 Presidential Election	South Korea	Democratic Party	8,041,284	33.82%	Defeated (2nd)
1996	15th National Assembly General Election	National (14th)	National Congress for New Politics	4,971,961	25.30%	Not Elected
1997	1997 Presidential Election	South Korea	National Congress for New Politics	10,326,275	40.27%	Won

== See also ==
- Liberalism in South Korea
- Cash-for-summit scandal
- KT

== Notes ==
Political offices
Preceded by Kim Young-sam	President of South Korea; 25 February 1998–24 February 2003	Succeeded by Roh Moo-hyun
Preceded by Cheon Hyeong-san	Member of the National Assembly from Inje County (Gangwon); 14 May 1961–16 May 1961	Succeeded by Lee Seung-choon (Hongcheon County–Inje County, Gangwon)
Preceded by Kim Moon-ok	Member of the National Assembly from Mokpo City (South Jeolla); 17 December 1963–30 June 1971	Succeeded by Kim Kyeong-in
Preceded by	Member of the National Assembly from National (2nd, New Democratic Party); 1 June 1971–17 October 1972	Succeeded by
Preceded by	Member of the National Assembly from National (11st, Peace Democratic Party); 30 May 1988–29 May 1992	Succeeded by
Preceded by	Member of the National Assembly from National (1st, Democratic Party); 30 May 1992–19 December 1992	Succeeded by
Party political offices
Preceded by New Office; Kim Dae-jung (himself); Park Young-sook (acting)	President of Peace Democratic Party, New United Democratic Party; 12 November 1987–7 March 1988; 17 May 1988–14 September 1991	Succeeded by Park Young-sook (acting); Kim Dae-jung (himself); Office abolished
Preceded by New Office	Co-president of Democratic Party; 16 September 1991–18 December 1992	Succeeded by Lee Ki-taek (President of Democratic Party)
New office	President of the National Congress for New Politics; 5 September 1995–20 January 2000	Office abolished
New office	President of the Millennium Democratic Party; 20 January 2000–8 November 2001	Succeeded by Han Kwang-ok (acting); Office abolished
Preceded by Yun Po-sun	New Democratic Party nominee for President of South Korea; 1971	Succeeded by Yu Chi-song (Democratic Korea Party nominee President South Korea)
Preceded by Yu Chi-song (Democratic Korea Party nominee President South Korea)	Peace Democratic Party, Democratic Party, National Congress for New Politics nominee for President of South Korea; 1987, 1992, 1997	Succeeded by Roh Moo-hyun
