= Global Campaign for Education =

Non-governmental organization

Global Campaign for Education (GCE) is an international coalition of non-governmental organizations, working to promote children's and adult education through research and advocacy. It was formed in 1999 as a partnership between NGOs that were separately active in the area, including ActionAid, Oxfam, Education International, Global March Against Child Labour and national networks in around 80 countries including Bangladesh and Brazil.

GCE is together with the International Council for Adult Education and Global Student Forum organising partner of the Education and Academia Stakeholder Group at the UN.
