= Global march against child labor =

The global march against child labour came about in 1998, following the significant response concerning the desire to end child labour. It was a grassroot movement that motivated many individuals and organizations to unite and fight against child labor, not an annual march.

The main goals of this movement were to:

- "Protect and promote the rights of all children, especially the rights to receive free, meaningful education"
- "To be free from economic exploitation and from performing any work that is likely to be damaging to a child's physical, mental, spiritual, moral or social development". The march was very successful and it achieved its purpose by allowing changes to occur with the policies of child labour with the International Labour Organization (ILO)

The United Nations declared 2021 as the International Year for the Elimination of Child Labour.

== Organizations that are involved ==
Currently, there are many organizations that supported the cause of the global march:

- Education International
- Oxfam International
- Action Aid
- World Vision
- Social Alert
- World Confederation of Teachers
- Save the Children Fund (UK)
- Public Services International (PSI)
- Free The Children
- Mani Tese

== International Steering Committee ==
An International Steering Committee (membership is pulled from almost every continent) for the Global March against child labor was formed and consisted of:

- African Network for the Prevention and Protection Against Child Abuse and Neglect in Kenya
- Anti-Slavery International in the United Kingdom
- Education International in Belgium
- FundaHao ABRINQ in Brazil
- International Labor Rights Fund in United States of America
- Network against Child Labour in South Africa
- Novib in the Netherlands
- Robert F. Kennedy Memorial Center for Human Rights in the United States of America
- South Asian Coalition on Child Servitude in India
- Terre des Hommes-Suisse in Switzerland

== Benefits ==
This march was important to children because it discourages them to experience economic exploitation in the labor field such as human trafficking. The policies that were introduced through this march emphasized highly on education. When children are educated it helps the economy since they are more likely to get out of their poverty stricken situation. By limiting education, it is limiting the prosperity

== Origins of the march ==
The march had 140 different countries that participated the act with thousands of partners. It consisted of events, rallies, foot marches and bus caravans. The first country that began the march was in Manila, Philippines on 17 January 1998. The marches took place in Asia, Africa, Latin America and the United States. Out of all of those people who participated in the march, only the select few known as the core marchers moved on to Geneva, Switzerland where the ILO were meeting for a possible revision of a new international convention on the most intolerable forms of child labor (Convention no. 182).

The US led their own nationwide march. It began in Los Angeles, California on 2 May 1998. The marchers went through all the major cities such as: Dallas, Little Rock, St Louis, Detroit and New York. The last city they visited was Washington, D.C., on 26 May 1998. From there, the core marchers went to Geneva, Switzerland. "The U.S. march has two main goals: to focus attention on domestic child labor problems, particularly those related to sweatshops and migrant agricultural work, and to encourage consumers to demand, retailers to sell and manufacturers to produce child-labor-free goods".

Within their nationwide march many organizations got actively involved. These U.S. organizations co-sponsored the Global March against Child Labor.

- AFL–CIO
- American Federation of Teachers
- Association of Farmworker Opportunity Programs
- Childreach/US Member of PLAN
- International Child Labor Coalition
- Church of the Brethren General Board/Office of Brethren Witness
- Community Action on Latin America
- Dr. Homa Darabi Foundation
- Free the Children/U.S.A.
- General Federation of Women's Clubs
- Global Kids Inc.
- International Labour Organization Washington/Branch Office
- International Labor Rights Fund
- The Kids Campaign To "Build A School for Iqbal"/Broad Meadows Middle School
- Kids Meeting Kids Can Make a Difference
- National Consumers League
- Political and Social Action Committee/Washington Ethical Society
- Robert F. Kennedy Memorial Center for Human Rights
- United Methodist Church General Board of Church and Society
- United Methodist Church: Women's Division General Board of Global Ministries
- Washington Ethical Action Office/American Ethical Union
- Women's Environment & Development Organization
- Youth Advocate Program International

== Evolution ==
This march initiated other events to come together to fight against child labor. The march spread the awareness of eliminating child labor in our society and worldwide. Here are some examples of events that branched off from this march:

- South Asian March against Child Trafficking
- UN announced the Global Initiative to Fight Human Trafficking
- Global Campaign for Education
- The World Cup Campaign 2002
- Fair Chocolate for the World
- Northern Advocacy Office in Washington, D.C.

== The First Children’s World Congress on Child Labour ==
The First Children's World Congress on Child Labour (CWWCL) was held in May 2004 in Florence, Italy. The event was organized by the Global March against Child Labor and other grassroots organizations.

Children were invited to the event through selection where at the Congress they were able to interact and communicate their views on the most pertinent concerns connected to their childhood and adolescence. They disclosed their experiences, dreams and ambitions as well as partake in various activities that lead to the formation of Action Plans. The selections for the Congress were made through democratic consultation processes (nominated by other children) at the national and local levels. Most of the representatives were former child laborers that got assistance from education and vocational training in local civic organizations or treatment centers; however some were still working so they could pay for their education and some were chosen to represent associations such as trade unions and Child Rights Organizations.

This Congress was significant because it was the first Congress where children were the focus and were the chief spokespersons, decision-makers and recipients. Approximately 200 children ages 11 to 17 were in attendance. The children that took part in the Congress came from diverse backgrounds and cultures and represented various regions, countries and organizations

This conference was crucial in understanding child labour and work exploitation

== Facts and statistics ==
- 1997: ILO estimated between 100 million and 200 million child laborers in the world
- 2004: ILO estimated that there were 218 million child laborers worldwide, with 7 of 10 working in agriculture
- To globally abolish child labor, ILO approximates an expense of $38 billion per year for 20 years.
- In 2001, Indian government confessed to having 12.7 million child laborers
- In Brazil to convince parents to send their children to school instead of work, the government pays families $4.50 per child a month. Currently, there are more than 1 million participants
- In Guatemala, female child laborers typically work 21 hours a week on domestic responsibilities coupled with a 40-hour working week beyond this.

== Events ==
At a match against Germany on 17 April 2002, the Argentina National Team demonstrated their unity on abolishing child labor. They lifted a banner that read, "The only work for children should be to go to school"

On 17 January 2004, the Global March against Child Labor celebrated its 6th anniversary in Quezon City. The celebration was held at the Occupational Safety and Health Center where more than 5,000 children and their parents marched from Quezon Memorial Circle to honor the movement. The ILO, government organizations, churches and other organizations were present at the celebration.

Political candidates were invited in hopes of convincing them to incorporate child labor issue in their platforms. The candidates were introduced to the issue of child labor and conversed with the children.

After the traditional signing of the RA 9231 all participants joined hands in giving appreciation to the strides made and rewards received because of the successes achieved by the Global March movement. Invited artists and chosen groups of child laborers showcased any talents and artistic skills they possessed in activities such as dancing, singing and playing musical instruments" .

== Recent events ==
The next country to encounter the march is Zimbabwe. The march took place on 1–31 December 2007. It started in Harare and ended in Plumtree. The goal was to combat child labor and to spread education to the children of that country. Media outlets were used to promote this event through television, newspaper and radio. The march was organized and implemented by New Hope Foundation, with support from the British Embassy in Zimbabwe, Save the Children UK and TER DES Homes Germany.
