= Bachpan Bachao Andolan =

India-based children's rights organisation

- Type: Non-profit

Bachpan Bachao Andolan (BBA; Save Childhood Movement) is an India-based children's rights movement. It was started in 1980 by Kailash Satyarthi. It campaigns against bonded labour, child labour and human trafficking, and promotes the right to education for all children. It has so far freed close to 100,000 children from servitude, including bonded labourers, and helped in their re-integration, rehabilitation and education.

== Purpose ==
The stated vision of Bachpan Bachao Andolan (BBA) is "to create a child-friendly society where all children are free from exploitation and receive a free and quality education."It aims to identify, liberate, rehabilitate and educate children in servitude through direct intervention, child and community participation, coalition building, consumer action, promoting ethical trade practices and mass mobilisation.

== History ==
BBA was formed in 1980 by Kailash Satyarthi, Nobel Peace Prize Laureate for 2014, who was appalled by the plight of child slavery across South Asia. Child labour has been socially accepted and widely practised in the region for generations, being seen as a necessary outcome of poverty. BBA became the first organization in India to highlight the issue and spawned the wider South Asian Coalition on Child Servitude (SACCS).

== Strategy ==
The work of BBA takes three strands, being prevention, protection and rehabilitation.

- Prevention is encouraged through community intervention. Public awareness campaigns and efforts to publicise the problems of child labour to consumers are important facets in this activity, as are initiatives at the grassroots level with villages in India where the practice has been tolerated by both employers and parents. The BBA's Child-Friendly Village program (in Hindi, Bal Mitra Gram, or BMG), has been accepted as a best practice model for development and elimination of child labour and trafficking. This program recognises those villages where child labour no longer exists, all children are enrolled in school and they have access to their own public assembly (the Bal Panchayat) that is officially recognised by the elected village council (the Gram Panchayat).
- Protection: where possible, the Indian legislative provisions are used to restrain and eliminate the practices of child labour and trafficking, and campaigns for tightening and developing the legislation are pursued. BBA works to recover fines from employers and traffickers and also to obtain monies owed to those whose labour has been used.
- Rehabilitation: BBA tries to ensure that rehabilitation remains the responsibility of the State (Govt.). Statutory rehabilitation is one of the key components of legal action. This includes a fine of 20,000 Rs. on the employer, in cases of child labour, a further compensation of Rs. 20,000 from the Govt., apart from other Govt. social welfare schemes.

In trafficking and child labour cases requiring transit rehabilitation and other support through residential care, the rescued children find their new life at BBA's transit rehabilitation centres - Mukti Ashram, situated at the outskirts of Delhi and Bal Ashram, situated in Virat Nagar, Rajasthan. Mukti Ashram is an immediate shelter for the children who are rescued from Delhi and its surroundings. They are immediately provided with medical help, food, clothing, recreational facilities, sports, theatre and counselling during their stay until the legal formalities are completed and they are repatriated and reunited with their families. On the other hand, children who do not have families to fall back upon finding a new home at Bal Ashram. Here, Children stay for a longer duration, receive basic as well as formal education as well as vocational training which may help them earn their living when they grow up.

Public Interest Litigations: BBA works on policy and legislative changes through effectively implementing the legal process and approaching the Supreme Court of India or various High Courts for making and enforcing policies in favour of children. This includes a number of judgements/ orders including the recent orders:

1. Upholding the Constitutional validity of Right to Education
2. Prohibition of employment of children in Circuses
3. Recovery of fines and cancellation/ sealing of establishments employing child labourers.
4. Protection of girls being trafficked through unregulated placement agencies.

== Campaigns ==
BBA has led the largest civil society initiative in the world against child labour in the form of the Global March Against Child Labour in 1998, leading to ILO Convention 182 on Worst Forms of Child Labour

One of the recent campaigns of BBA include:

Child Labour Free India Campaign: for an amendment in Child Labour (Prohibition & Regulation) Act, 1986 for total abolition on child labour till the age of 14 yrs., in line with ILO Convention 138.

Right to Education Campaign:

- In 2001, BBA had led the campaign demanding Fundamental Right to Education, with over 180 Members of Parliament and a 15,000 km long march across the country, resulting in a constitutional amendment and the Right of Children to Free and Compulsory Education Act.

Child Domestic Labour campaign

- 6487 Letters sent to all judges in High Court, Supreme Court, Education department, social welfare department, Commissions, members Lok Sabha, Rajya Sabha etc. to create awareness
- 16140 Stickers pasted in total 320 villages and RWAs across the country.
- In Delhi, 225 Resident Welfare Associations pledged to make their home child labour free.

Mukti Caravan (campaign against child trafficking for forced labour)

- Covered 158 villages in UP, Bihar, Delhi and Rajasthan
- 750 street plays, approx. 3500 wall writings, rallies, Public Vigilance Committees 70 formed, 250 schools reached
- Follow up of 137 child labourers, 2 child marriages stopped
- Complaint received – 350 approx

Missing Children Campaign: biggest ever research undertaken on missing children, resulting in Supreme Court issuing notice to all states and union territories on missing children.

== See also ==
- Street children in India
