= Slavery in India =

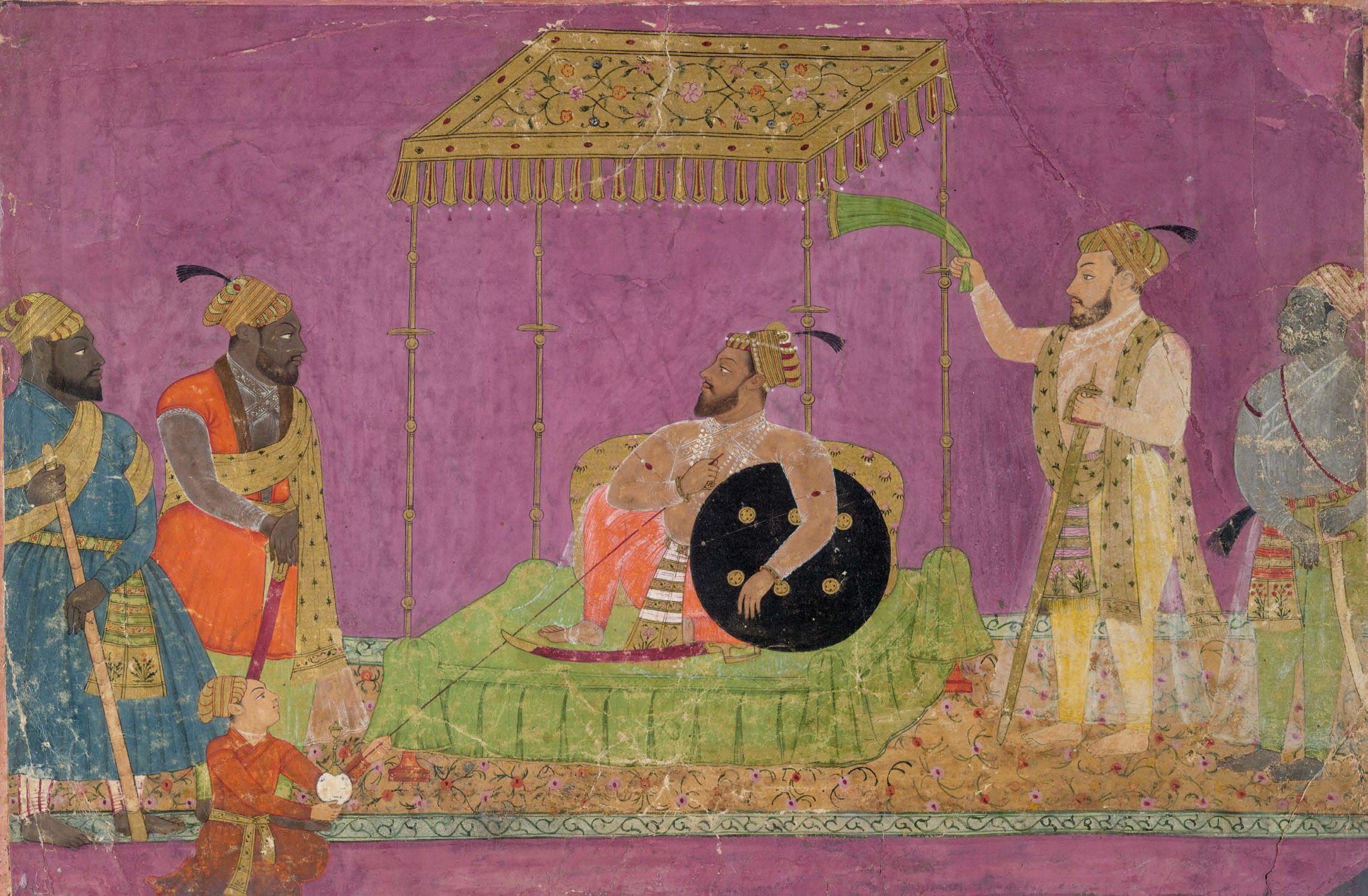
Sultan Muhammad Adil Shah of Bijapur and African courtiers (siddi slaves), ca, 1640

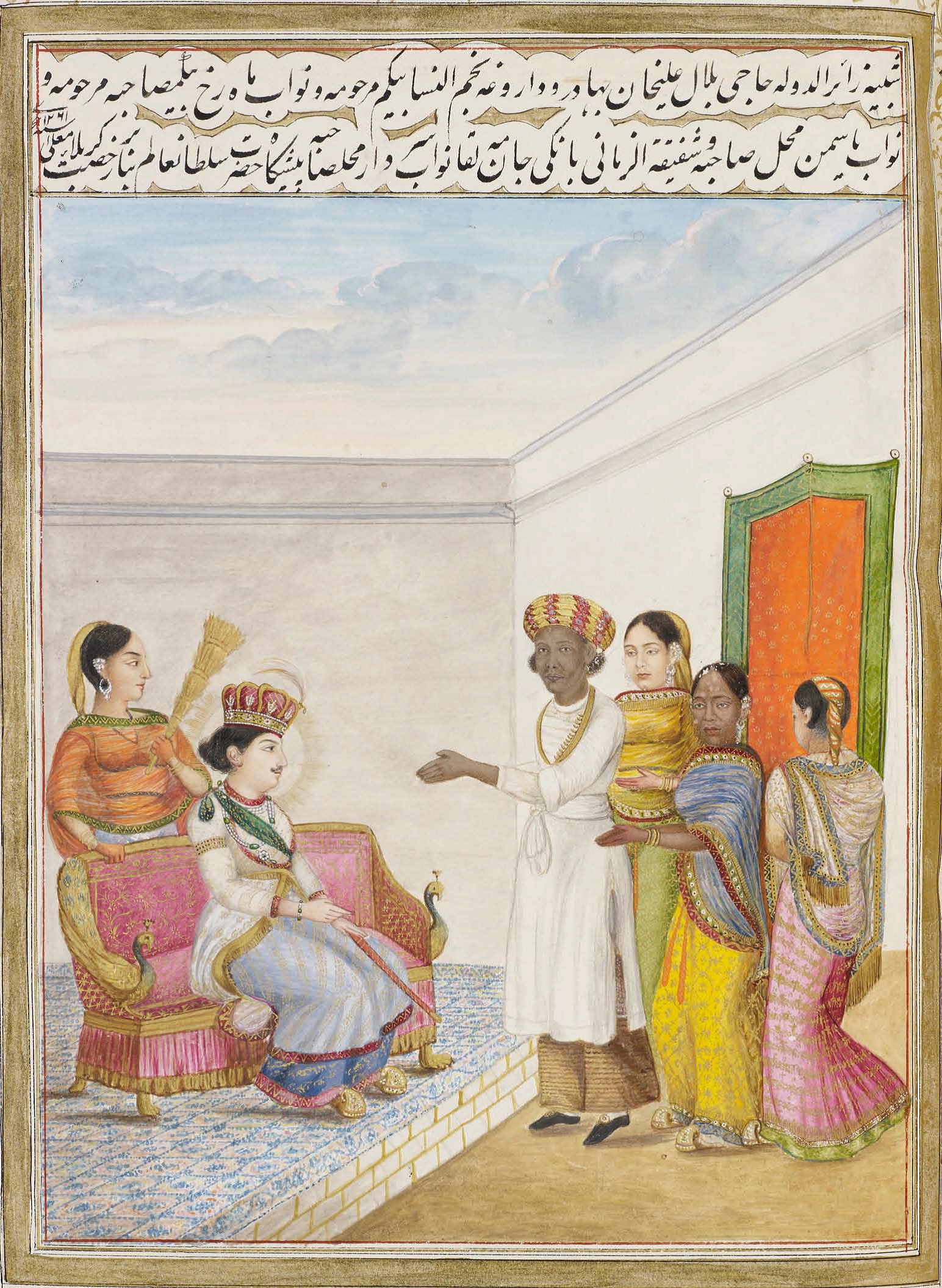
African eunuch (3rd from left) and African queen Yasmin (2nd from right) at the court of Wajid Ali Shah. The eunuch is likely to have been a siddi slave

The early history of slavery in the Indian subcontinent is contested because it depends on the translations of terms such as dasa and dasyu used since the Vedic period.

Greek writer Megasthenes, in his 4th century BCE work Indika or Indica, states that slavery was banned within the Maurya Empire, while the multilingual, mid 3rd Century BCE, Edicts of Ashoka independently identify obligations to slaves (Greek: δούλοις) and hired workers (Greek: μισθωτοῖς), within the same Empire.

Slavery in India escalated during the Muslim conquests and domination of northern India from the 11th century. It became a social institution with the enslavement of Hindus, along with the use of slaves in armies, a practice within Muslim kingdoms of the time. According to Muslim historians of the Delhi Sultanate and the Mughal Empire era, after the invasions of Hindu kingdoms, other Indians were taken as slaves, with many exported to Central Asia and West Asia. Slaves from the Horn of Africa were also imported into the Indian subcontinent to serve in the households of the powerful or the Muslim armies of the Deccan Sultanates and the Mughal Empire.

The Portuguese imported African slaves into their Indian colonies on the Konkan coast between about 1530 and 1740. Under European colonialism, slavery in India continued through the 18th and 19th centuries. During this time, slavery continued to largely be in the form of debt slavery as opposed to chattel slavery. Indian slaves were taken to different parts of the world as agrarian slaves by various European merchant companies as part of the Indian Ocean slave trade.

Slavery was prohibited in the possessions of the East India Company by the Indian Slavery Act, 1843, in French India in 1848, British India in 1861, and Portuguese India in 1876. The abolition of chattel slavery in European colonies in the 1830s led to the emergence of a system of indentured Indian labor. Over a century, more than a million Indians, known as girmitiyas, were recruited to serve fixed-term labor contracts (often five years) in European colonies across Africa, the Indian Ocean, Asia, and the Americas, primarily on the previously slave labour dependent plantations and mines. While distinct from chattel slavery, the grueling conditions and restricted freedoms experienced by many girmitiyas have led some historians to classify their system of labor as akin to slavery.

== Slavery in Ancient India ==
In order to highlight the importance of the prince's birth, the author narrates the multi-ethnic collection of the slave women who took part in the prince's upbringing and birth. This account perhaps is the earliest evidence of Greek slave women serving in India:

"Now little Goyame was attended by five nurses—to wit, a wet-nurse, a bath-nurse, a lap-nurse, and a play-nurse—also by many hunchback women, Kirata women, dwarf women, misshapen women, (Note: 'In Hindu literature dwarfs and monsters are regular attendants of harems') women of Babbara, Pausaya (or Vausaya), Greek, Palhavaya (Pahlavi?)......women of divers lands....Surrounded by this goodly throng of slave-girls and bands of maids..."

— Antagada-Dasao

In Bihar, a Greek slave woman is mentioned as a servant of the Jain harem, predating Alexander. As evidenced already, at least a hundred years prior to Seleucus Nicator I's daughter, Cornelia, was not the first Greek woman to reside in an Indian harem. Cornelia's arrival, probably further brought a lot more Greek women (both slaves and non slaves) into India.

Herodotus narrated that Indian troops in the Mediterranean, who fought as allies or vassals (of the Persian emperor), probably seized Greek women as booty to India.

Also in India, Greek courtezans were demeaned and encountered difficulties:

"But I should not accost her. For who will listen to the Greek (Yavani) courtezan's words which are like the chattering of a monkey, full of shrill sounds and of indistinguishable consonants...?"

— Śyāmilaka 111-112

The earliest surviving South Asian epigraphy, the mid 3rd Century BCE, Edicts of Ashoka, in Greek and Aramaic, independently identify obligations to slaves (Greek: δούλοις, Aramaic: עבד) and hired workers (Greek: μισθωτοῖς), later prohibiting the trading of slaves within the Empire.

Dāsa are offered in examples of Pāṇini's, probably mid 4th century BCE, Sanskrit grammar, the Aṣṭādhyāyī, e.g. 2.3.69 "lusting for the slave", 2.4.24 "the concourse of ladies and slaves".

The term dāsa and dāsyu in Vedic and other ancient Indian literature has been interpreted by as "servant" or "slave", but others have contested such meaning. The term dāsa in the Rigveda, has been also been translated as an enemy, but overall the identity of this term remains unclear and disputed among scholars.

According to Scott Levi, it was likely an established institution in Ancient India by the start of the common era based on texts such as the Arthashastra, the Manusmriti and the Mahabharata. Slavery was "likely widespread by the lifetime of the Buddha and perhaps even as far back as the Vedic period", however he elaborates that the association of the Vedic dasa with 'slaves' is "problematic and likely to have been a later development".

Upinder Singh states that the Rig Veda is familiar with slavery, referring to enslavement in course of war or as a result of debt. She states that the use of dasa (Sanskrit: दास) and dasi in later times were used as terms for male and female slaves. In contrast, Suvira Jaiswal states that dasa tribes were integrated in the lineage system of Vedic traditions, wherein dasi putras could rise to the status of priests, warriors and chiefs as shown by the examples of Kaksivant Ausija, Balbutha, Taruksa, Divodasa and others. Some scholars contest the earlier interpretations of the term dasa as "slave", with or without "racial distinctions". According to Indologists Stephanie W. Jamison and Joel P. Brereton, known for their recent translation of the Rigveda, the dasa and dasyu are human and non-human beings who are enemies of Arya. These according to the Rigveda, state Jamison and Brereton, are destroyed by the Vedic deity Indra. The interpretation of "dasas as slaves" in the Vedic era is contradicted by hymns such as 2.12 and 8.46 that describe "wealthy dasas" who charitably give away their wealth. Similarly, state Jamison and Brereton, the "racial distinctions" are not justified by the evidence. According to the Indologist Thomas Trautmann, the relationship between the Arya and Dasa appears only in two verses of the Rigveda, is vague and unexpected since the dasa were "in some ways more economically advanced" than the Arya according to the textual evidence.

According to Asko Parpola, the term dasa in ancient Indian texts has proto-Saka roots, where dasa or daha simply means "man". Both "dasa" and "dasyu" are uncommon in Indo-Iranian languages (including Sanskrit and Pali), and these words may be a legacy of the PIE root "*dens-", and the word "saka" may have evolved from "dasa", states Parpola. According to Micheline Ishay – a professor of human rights studies and sociology, the term "dasa" can be "translated as slave". The institution represented unfree labor with fewer rights, but "the supposed slavery in [ancient] India was of mild character and limited extent" like Babylonian and Hebrew slavery, in contrast to the Hellenic world. The "unfree labor" could be of two types in ancient India: the underadsatva and the ahitaka, states Ishay. A person in distress could pledge themselves for work leading to underadsatava, while under ahitaka a person's "unfree labor" was pledged or mortgaged against a debt or ransom when captured during a war. These forms of slavery limited the duration of "unfree labor" and such a slave had rights to their property and could pass their property to their kin, states Ishay.

The term dasa appears in early Buddhist texts, a term scholars variously interpret as servant or slave. Buddhist manuscripts also mention kapyari, which scholars have translated as a legally bonded servant (slave). According to Gregory Schopen, in the Mahaviharin Vinaya, the Buddha says that a community of monks may accept dasa for repairs and other routine chores. Later, the same Buddhist text states that the Buddha approved the use of kalpikara and the kapyari for labor in the monasteries and approved building separate quarters for them. Schopen interprets the term dasa as servants, while he interprets the kalpikara and kapyari as bondmen and slave respectively because they can be owned and given by laity to the Buddhist monastic community. According to Schopen, since these passages are not found in Indian versions of the manuscripts, but found in a Sri Lankan version, these sections may have been later interpolations that reflect a Sri Lankan tradition, rather than early Indian. The discussion of servants and bonded labor is also found in manuscripts found in Tibet, though the details vary.

The discussion of servant, bonded labor and slaves, states Scopen, differs significantly in different manuscripts discovered for the same Buddhist text in India, Nepal and Tibet, whether they are in Sanskrit or Pali language. These Buddhist manuscripts present a set of questions to ask a person who wants to become a monk or nun. These questions inquire if the person is a dasa and dasi, but also ask additional questions such as "are you ahrtaka" and "are you vikritaka". The later questions have been interpreted in two ways. As "are you one who has been seized" (ahrtaka) and "are you one who has been sold" (vikritaka) respectively, these terms are interpreted as slaves. Alternatively, they have also been interpreted as "are you doubtless" and "are you blameworthy" respectively, which does not mean slave. Further, according to these texts, Buddhist monasteries refused all servants, bonded labor and slaves an opportunity to become a monk or nun, but accepted them as workers to serve the monastery.

The Indian texts discuss dasa and bonded labor along with their rights, as well as a monastic community's obligations to feed, clothe and provide medical aid to them in exchange for their work. This description of rights and duties in Buddhist Vinaya texts, says Schopen, parallel those found in Hindu Dharmaśāstra and Dharmasutra texts. The Buddhist attitude to servitude or slavery as reflected in Buddhist texts, states Schopen, may reflect a "passive acceptance" of cultural norms of the Brahmanical society midst them, or more "justifiably an active support" of these institutions. The Buddhist texts offer "no hint of protest or reform" to such institutions, according to Schopen.

Kautilya's Arthashastra dedicates the thirteenth chapter on dasas, in his third book on law. This Sanskrit document from the Maurya Empire period (4th century BCE) has been translated by several authors, each in a different manner. Shamasastry's translation of 1915 maps dasa as slave, while Kangle leaves the words as dasa and karmakara. According to Kangle's interpretation, the verse 13.65.3–4 of Arthasastra forbids any slavery of "an Arya in any circumstances whatsoever", but allows the mlecchas to "sell an offspring or keep it as pledge". Patrick Olivelle agrees with this interpretation. He adds that an Arya or Arya family could pledge itself during times of distress into bondage, and these bonded individuals could be converted to slave if they committed a crime thereby differing with Kangle's interpretation. According to Kangle, the Arthasastra forbids enslavement of minors and Arya from all four varnas and this inclusion of shudras stands different from the Vedic literature. Kangle suggests that the context and rights granted to dasa by Kautilya implies that the word had a different meaning than the modern word slave, as well as the meaning of the word slave in Greek or other ancient and medieval civilizations. According to Arthashastra, anyone who had been found guilty of nishpatitah (Sanskrit: निष्पातित, ruined, bankrupt, a minor crime) may mortgage oneself to become dasa for someone willing to pay his or her bail and employ the dasa for money and privileges.

The term dasa in Indic literature when used as a suffix to a bhagavan (deity) name, refers to a pious devotee.

The Buddhist Vanijja Sutta, AN 5:177 listing slave trading to be one of the five wrong livelihood a layperson should not engage in the "Monks, a lay follower should not engage in five types of business. Which five? Business in weapons, business in human beings, business in meat, business in intoxicants, and business in poison. These are the five types of business that a lay follower should not engage in."

Late classical Hindu Dharmaśāstra, would specify who can be enslaved, the treatment of enslaved, and acceptable forms of Vishti (corvee labour), by varna; a theme later medieval commentaries, of the like of Devaṇabhaṭṭa's Smṛticandrikā, would refine.

During the Tang dynasty (618–907), foreign captives and slaves were present in China, including individuals described as "Kunlun" slaves, a category that referred broadly to people from Southeast Asia, South Asia, and sometimes Africa. In 648, the Tang envoy Wang Xuance, after being attacked during a mission to India, returned with Tibetan and Nepali military allies to engage in the Battle of Chabuheluo and captured thousands of people in Central India, including members of the royal family, who were taken to Chang’an. This episode demonstrates that Indians were among Tang war captives. However, the broader identification of Indians as "Kunlun" slaves remains debated among historians, and there is no clear evidence that Tang soldiers systematically enslaved large numbers of northern Indians.

== Slavery in Medieval India ==
Slavery was an important feature of the Muslim conquests of the Indian subcontinent. André Wink summarizes the period as follows,

Slavery and empire-formation tied in particularly well with iqta and it is within this context of Islamic expansion that elite slavery was later commonly found. It became the predominant system in North India in the thirteenth century and retained considerable importance in the fourteenth century. Slavery was still vigorous in fifteenth-century Bengal, while after that date it shifted to the Deccan where it persisted until the seventeenth century. It remained present to a minor extent in the Mughal provinces throughout the seventeenth century and had a notable revival under the Afghans in North India again in the eighteenth century.

— Al Hind, André Wink

Unlike other parts of the medieval Muslim world, slavery was not widespread in Kashmir. Except for the Sultans, there is no evidence the elite kept slaves. The Kashmiris despised slavery. Concubinage was also not practised.

Studies of slave trade records and surviving legal documents indicate that Indians made up a significant proportion of slaves sold in Central Asian markets. Though slaves from India became a minority from the 16th century onwards, as significant number of Iranian war-captives were brought north and enslaved during the course of numerous armed conflicts between the Central Asian Uzbeks and Iranian Safavids. Because of the fragmentary nature of the evidence, scholars have not reached a consensus on the total number of Hindus enslaved during this period. However, based on documented campaign figures and export records, historians estimate that the cumulative total over many centuries may have reached several hundred thousand to over 1 million. These practices gradually declined with the rise of early modern state reforms and the increasing influence of European colonial powers, which eventually abolished legal slavery in India during the nineteenth century.

A document dated to 1431 C.E., gives reference to an instance where Vellalar men and women slaves were given as dowry alongside Paraiyars and livestock.

In an inscription found in the Thiruchirappalli district dated to the early 14th century Vijayanagara period, a potentate by the name of Mazhavadharaiyan is said to have enslaved and owned a Vellalar family consisting of a Vellala man named Thavanjeidhan and his wife along with his sons.

Historian Noboru Karashima notes that Vellalars too were a slave caste in the medieval period despite being an influential agricultural community, this is attested by some inscriptions of Vellalars being sold as low-ranking slaves alongside members of other outcaste communities. It also reflects their once comparatively lower social status in some areas.

=== Islamic invasions (8th to 12th century AD) ===
Andre Wink summarizes the slavery in 8th and 9th century India as follows,

(During the invasion of Muhammad al-Qasim), invariably numerous women and children were enslaved. The sources insist that now, in dutiful conformity to religious law, 'the one-fifth of the slaves and spoils' were set apart for the caliph's treasury and despatched to Iraq and Syria. The remainder was scattered among the army of Islam. At Rūr, a random 60,000 captives reduced to slavery. At Brahamanabad 30,000 slaves were allegedly taken. At Multan 6,000. Slave raids continued to be made throughout the late Umayyad period in Sindh, but also much further into Hind, as far as Ujjain and Malwa. The Abbasid governors raided Punjab, where many prisoners and slaves were taken.

— Al Hind, André Wink

One of the more known cases of slavery during the Umayyad conquest of Sindh was that of Surya Devi and her sister. In the early 11th century Tarikh al-Yamini, the Arab historian Al-Utbi recorded that in 1001 the armies of Mahmud of Ghazni conquered Peshawar and Waihand (capital of Gandhara) after Battle of Peshawar (1001), "in the midst of the land of Hindustan", and enslaved thousands. Later, following his twelfth expedition into India in 1018–19, Mahmud is reported to have returned to with such a large number of slaves that their value was reduced to only two to ten dirhams each. This unusually low price made, according to Al-Utbi, "merchants came from distant cities to purchase them, so that the countries of Central Asia, Iraq and Khurasan were swelled with them, and the fair and the dark, the rich and the poor, mingled in one common slavery".

Warfare and tax revenue policies was the cause of enslavement of Indians for the Central Asian slave market already during the Umayyad conquest of Sindh of the 8th century, when the armies of the Umayyad commander Muhammad bin Qasim enslaved tens of thousands of Indian civilians and well as soldiers.

During the Ghaznavid campaigns in India of the 11th-century, hundreds of thousands of Indians were captured and sold on the Central Asian slave markets; in 1014 "the army of Islam brought to Ghazna about 200,000 captives (qarib do sit hazar banda), and much wealth, so that the capital appeared like an Indian city, no soldier of the camp being without wealth, or without many slaves", and during the expedition of the Ghaznavid ruler Sultan Ibrahim to the Multan area of northwestern India 100,000 captives were brought back to Central Asia, and the Ghaznavids were said to have captured "five hundred thousand slaves, beautiful men and women".

=== Delhi Sultanate (12th to 16th century AD) ===
During the Delhi Sultanate period (1206–1526), references to the abundant availability of low-priced Indian slaves abound. Many of these Indian slaves were used by Muslim nobility in the subcontinent, but others were exported to satisfy the demand in international markets. Many slaves were forcibly converted to Islam. Children fathered by Muslim masters on non-Muslim slaves would be raised Muslim. Non-Muslim women, who Muslim soldiers and elites had slept with, would convert to Islam to avoid rejection by their own communities. Scott Levi states that "Movement of considerable numbers of Hindus to the Central Asian slave markets was largely a product of the state building efforts of the Delhi Sultanate and Mughal Empire in South Asia".

The revenue system of the Delhi Sultanate produced a considerable proportion of the Indian slave population as these rulers, and their subordinate shiqadars, ordered their armies to abduct large numbers of locals as a means of extracting revenue. While those communities that were loyal to the Sultan and regularly paid their taxes were often excused from this practice, taxes were commonly extracted from other, less loyal groups in the form of slaves. Thus, according to Barani, the Shamsi "slave-king" Balban (r. 1266–87) ordered his shiqadars in Awadh to enslave those peoples resistant to his authority, implying those who refused to supply him with tax revenue. Sultan Alauddin Khalji (r. 1296–1316) is similarly reported to have legalised the enslavement of those who defaulted on their revenue payments. This policy continued during the Mughal era.

An even greater number of people were enslaved as a part of the efforts of the Delhi Sultans to finance their expansion into new territories. For example, while he himself was still a military slave of the Ghurid Sultan Muizz u-Din, Qutb-ud-din Aybak (r. 1206–10 as the first of the Shamsi slave-kings) invaded Gujarat in 1197 and placed some 20,000 people in bondage. Roughly six years later, he enslaved an additional 50,000 people during his conquest of Kalinjar. Later in the 13th century, Balban's campaign in Ranthambore, reportedly defeated the Indian army and yielded "captives beyond computation".

Levi states that the forcible enslavement of non-Muslims during Delhi Sultanate was motivated by the desire for war booty and military expansion. This gained momentum under the Khalji and Tughluq dynasties, as being supported by available figures. Zia uddin Barani suggested that Sultan Alauddin Khalji owned 50,000 slave-boys, in addition to 70,000 construction slaves. Sultan Firuz Shah Tughluq is said to have owned 180,000 slaves, roughly 12,000 of whom were skilled artisans. The need to secure the Sultanate regime from Mongol marauders led to the delineation of a frontier that needed to be defended. To guard the Punjab marches, there was increasingly more and more slaves that were being bought. Their allegiance was not along ethnic lines, and their dedicated patronage allowed them to incorporate themselves into the military hierarchy as trusted officers and commanders. The Sultanate bought Turks in order to develop a strong cavalry arm and in particular to amass a corps of mounted archers. This was a proprietary way to build their military capacity, by taking advantage of a unique skillset. Jalaluddin Firuz Khalji and Ghiyath al-Din Tughluq were both frontier military commanders. When they tried to capitalize on their achievements, and take over the Delhi Sultanate they were not given support because of their un-noble origins. When looking at the high level of military success, advancement and capacity that the Turkic slaves added, it is disproportionate to popular sentiment regarding their Turkic origins.

Alauddin also fixed the prices for slaves and animals. Barani gives the following prices for slaves:

Slave prices
Type of slave	Price
Female slave for domestic work	5–12 tankas
Female slave for concubinage	20–40 tankas
Handsome, young male slave	20–30 tankas
Slave experienced in work	10–15 tankas
Inexperienced young slave	7–8 tankas

Barani states that very few slaves were sold for 100-200 tankas: if an expensive slave, whose normal price would be 1,000-2,000 after Alauddin's death, appeared in the market, nobody would buy it because of the fear of Alauddin's spies.

During the Delhi Sultanate, Hindus were enslaved in such large quantities for export to the Central Asian slave market that Indian slaves became low price slaves, available and affordable, and increased their demand in international markets. Aside for war captives enslaved during The Delhi Sultanate were provided with large numbers of Hindu slaves via their revenue system, in which the subordinate iqta'dars ordered their armies to abduct Hindus in large numbers as a means of extracting revenue. Taxes were often extracted from communities less loyal to the Sultan in the form of slaves, and non-Muslims who were not able to pay taxes could be defined as resisting the authority of the Sultan and thus abducted as slaves in warfare; Sultan 'Ala al-Din Khalji (r. 1296–1316) legalized the enslavement of non-Muslims who defaulted on their revenue payments.

In this period, slaves were also first exported from the Somali coast to India. According to historian Molefi Kete Asante, the Somali sultan Jamal ad-Din II (1424-1433) sent conquered Ethiopian captives to India. Ludovico di Varthema, who visited Zeila in 1503, described Abyssinian slaves captured in war being exported from the Somali coast to India.

== Mughal Empire (16th to 19th century) ==
The slave trade continued to exist in the Mughal Empire. One Dutch merchant in the 17th century writes about Abd Allah Khan Firuz Jang, an Uzbek noble at the Mughal court during the 1620s and 1630s, who was appointed to the position of governor of the regions of Kalpi and Kher and, in the process of subjugating the local rebels, beheaded the leaders and enslaved their women, daughters and children, who were more than 200,000 in number.

When Shah Shuja was appointed as governor of Kabul, he carried out a war in Indian territory beyond the Indus. Most of the women burnt themselves to death to save their honour. Those captured were "distributed" among Muslim mansabdars. The Augustinian missionary Fray Sebastian Manrique, who was in Bengal in 1629–30 and again in 1640, remarked on the ability of the shiqdār—a Mughal officer responsible for executive matters in the pargana, the smallest territorial unit of imperial administration to collect the revenue demand, by force if necessary, and even to enslave peasants should they default in their payments.

A survey of a relatively small, restricted sample of seventy-seven letters regarding the manumission or sale of slaves in the Majmua-i-wathaiq reveals that slaves of Indian origin (Hindi al-asal) accounted for over fifty-eight percent of those slaves whose region of origin is mentioned. The Khutut-i-mamhura bemahr-i qadat-i Bukhara, a smaller collection of judicial documents from early-eighteenth-century Bukhara, includes several letters of manumission, with over half of these letters referring to slaves "of Indian origin". In the model of a legal letter of manumission written by the chief qazi for his assistant to follow, the example used is of a slave "of Indian origin". But, it is important to note that those samples were isolated, small in size, and specific to certain regions, hence it would be inaccurate to assume that indians accounted for such percentages in the general slave populous in Central Asia. By the early modern period, most of the slaves traded in the markets of Bukhara and Khiva were of Persian and Slavic origin. Indian slaves continued to be sold in the Central Asian slave markets even in the 18th century, though in reduced numbers. Bukhara slave market. The export of slaves from India was limited to debt defaulters and rebels against the Mughal Empire. The Gakhars of Punjab acted as intermediaries for such slave for trade to Central Asian buyers.

Slaves from the Horn of Africa appeared again in India during this period. In 1525, the Somali military general Imam Ahmed bin Ibrahim al-Ghazi started his invasion of Ethiopia with a Somali army.In some of his campaigns, his soldiers had so many slaves and loot that he was forced to make them abandon it as it was slowing them down. In the course of these military campaigns, Imam Ahmad captured an innumerable amount slaves, this led to a vast, though incalculable, increase in the number of Habesha slaves arriving in the Indian subcontinent. João de Castro wrote that Ethiopian slaves serving as soldiers in India were held in high regard to such a degree that there was a proverb throughout India that good soldiers or servants must be Abyssinian. He added that they were so highly regarded in Bengal, Cambay, Balagate, and other parts of India that those who commanded armies or held high rank were all drawn from among them. The war was considered a major reason for the importation of Ethiopian slaves into India during the sixteenth century. Abyssinians of slave origin played a major role in the politics of Mughal India, where they were called Habshis.

=== Fatawa-i Alamgiri ===
The Fatawa-e-Alamgiri (also known as the Fatawa-i-Hindiya and Fatawa-i Hindiyya) was sponsored by Aurangzeb in the late 17th century. It compiled the law for the Mughal Empire, and involved years of effort by 500 Muslim scholars from South Asia, Iraq and Saudi Arabia. The thirty volumes on Hanafi-based sharia law for the Empire was influential during and after Aurangzeb's rule, and it included many chapters and laws on slavery and slaves in India.

Some of the slavery-related law included in Fatawa-i Alamgiri were,

- the right of Muslims to purchase and own slaves,
- a Muslim man's right to have sex with a captive slave girl he owns or a slave girl owned by another Muslim (with master's consent) without marrying her,
- no inheritance rights for slaves,
- the testimony of all slaves was inadmissible in a court of law
- slaves require permission of the master before they can marry,
- an unmarried Muslim may marry a slave girl he owns but a Muslim married to a Muslim woman may not marry a slave girl,
- conditions under which the slaves may be emancipated partially or fully.

=== Export of Indian slaves to international markets ===
Alongside Buddhist Oirats, Christian Russians, Afghans, and the predominantly Shia Iranians, Indian slaves were an important component of the highly active slave markets of medieval and early modern Central Asia. The all pervasive nature of slavery in this period in Central Asia is shown by the 17th century records of one Juybari Sheikh, a Naqshbandi Sufi leader, owning over 500 slaves, forty of whom were specialists in pottery production while the others were engaged in agricultural work. High demand for skilled slaves, and India's larger and more advanced textile industry, agricultural production and tradition of architecture demonstrated to its neighbours that skilled-labour was abundant in the subcontinent leading to enslavement and export of large numbers of skilled labour as slaves, following their successful invasions.

After sacking Delhi, Timur enslaved several thousand skilled artisans, presenting many of these slaves to his subordinate elite, although reserving the masons for use in the construction of the Bibi-Khanym Mosque in Samarkand. Young female slaves fetched higher market price than skilled construction slaves, sometimes by 150%, as they could be kept as sex slaves.

== Slavery in Colonial India (17th to 20th century) ==
=== 17th century ===
Slavery existed in Portuguese India after the 16th century. "Most of the Portuguese," says Albert. D. Mandelslo, a German itinerant writer, "have many slaves of both sexes, whom they employ not only on and about their persons, but also upon the business they are capable of, for what they get comes with the master."

Japanese slave girls were still owned by India based Portuguese (Lusitanian) families according to Francisco De Sousa, a Jesuit who wrote about it in 1698, long after the 1636 edict by Tokugawa Japan had expelled Portuguese people.

The Dutch, too, largely dealt in slaves. They were mainly Abyssinian, known in India as Habshis. The mixed race of Sheedes in Kanara on the West coast has traces of these slaves.

The Dutch Indian Ocean slave trade was primarily mediated by the Dutch East India Company, drawing captive labour from three commercially closely linked regions: the western, or Southeast Africa, Madagascar, and the Mascarene Islands (Mauritius and Reunion); the middle, or Indian subcontinent (Malabar, Coromandel, and the Bengal/Arakan coast); and the eastern, or Malaysia, Indonesia, New Guinea (Irian Jaya), and the southern Philippines.

During the seventeenth century, the Dutch East India Company (VOC) acquired a significant portion of its slave population from the Indian subcontinent. Enslaved people were taken from regions such as the Coromandel and Malabar coasts, Bengal, the Arakan littoral, and Ceylon, and were transported primarily to Batavia and other VOC settlements. In the early decades of the century, South Asia was one of the principal supply zones for the Company, although by the mid-1660s the reliance on Indian slaves declined as Southeast Asia became a more important source. Indian slaves in the Dutch colonies worked in a range of occupations, including domestic service, construction, and agricultural labour. Vink notes that local resistance sometimes restricted this trade, as Mughal and South Indian rulers opposed the export of human beings from their territories.

The Dutch traded slaves from fragmented or weak small states and stateless societies in the East beyond the sphere of Islamic influence, to the company's Asian headquarters, the "Chinese colonial city" of Batavia (Jakarta), and its regional centre in coastal Sri Lanka. Other destinations included the important markets of Malacca (Melaka) and Makassar (Ujungpandang), along with the plantation economies of eastern Indonesia (Maluku, Ambon, and Banda Islands), and the agricultural estates of the southwestern Cape Colony (South Africa).

On the Indian subcontinent, Arakan/Bengal, Malabar, and Coromandel remained the most important source of forced labour until the 1660s. Between 1626 and 1662, the Dutch exported on an average 150–400 slaves annually from the Arakan-Bengal coast. During the first thirty years of Batavia's existence, Indian and Arakanese slaves provided the main labour force of the company's Asian headquarters. Of the 211 manumitted slaves in Batavia between 1646 and 1649, 126 (59.71%) came from South Asia, including 86 (40.76%) from Bengal. Slave raids into the Bengal estuaries were conducted by joint forces of Magh pirates, and Portuguese traders (chatins) operating from Chittagong outside the jurisdiction and patronage of the Estado da India, using armed vessels (galias). These raids occurred with the active connivance of the Taung-ngu (Toungoo) rulers of Arakan. The eastward expansion of the Mughal Empire, however, completed with the conquest of Chittagong in 1666, cut off the traditional supplies from Arakan and Bengal. Until the Dutch seizure of the Portuguese settlements on the Malabar coast (1658–63), large numbers of slaves were also captured and sent from India's west coast to Batavia, Ceylon, and elsewhere. After 1663, however, the stream of forced labour from Cochin dried up to a trickle of about 50–100 and 80–120 slaves per year to Batavia and Ceylon, respectively.

In contrast with other areas of the Indian subcontinent, Coromandel remained the centre of a sporadic slave trade throughout the seventeenth century. In various short-lived expansions accompanying natural and human-induced calamities, the Dutch exported thousands of slaves from the east coast of India. A prolonged period of drought followed by famine conditions in 1618–20 saw the first large-scale export of slaves from the Coromandel coast in the seventeenth century. Between 1622 and 1623, 1,900 slaves were shipped from central Coromandel ports, like Pulicat and Devanampattinam. Company officials on the coast declared that 2,000 more could have been bought if only they had the funds.

The second expansion in the export of Coromandel slaves occurred during a famine following the revolt of the Nayaka Indian rulers of South India (Tanjavur, Senji, and Madurai) against Bijapur overlordship (1645) and the subsequent devastation of the Tanjavur countryside by the Bijapur army. Reportedly, more than 150,000 people were taken by the invading Deccani Muslim armies to Bijapur and Golconda. In 1646, 2,118 slaves were exported to Batavia, the overwhelming majority from southern Coromandel. Some slaves were also acquired further south at Tondi, Adirampatnam, and Kayalpatnam.

A third phase in slaving took place between 1659 and 1661 from Tanjavur as a result of a series of successive Bijapuri raids. At Nagapatnam, Pulicat, and elsewhere, the company purchased 8,000–10,000 slaves, the bulk of whom were sent to Ceylon while a small portion were exported to Batavia and Malacca. A fourth phase (1673–77) started from a long drought in Madurai and southern Coromandel starting in 1673, and intensified by the prolonged Madurai-Maratha struggle over Tanjavur and punitive fiscal practices. Between 1673 and 1677, 1,839 slaves were exported from the Madurai coast alone. A fifth phase occurred in 1688, caused by poor harvests and the Mughal advance into the Karnatak. Thousands of people from Tanjavur, mostly girls and little boys, were sold into slavery and exported by Asian traders from Nagapattinam to Aceh, Johor, and other slave markets. In September 1687, 665 slaves were exported by the East India Company from Fort St. George, Madras. Finally, in 1694–96, when warfare once more ravaged South India, a total of 3,859 slaves were imported from Coromandel by private individuals into Ceylon.

The volume of the total Dutch Indian Ocean slave trade has been estimated to be about 15–30% of the Atlantic slave trade, slightly smaller than the trans-Saharan slave trade, and one-and-a-half to three times the size of the Swahili and Red Sea coast and the Dutch West India Company slave trades.

=== Slavery in Malabar ===
The main agrestic slave castes in Malabar were Pulayars, Paraiyars, Kuruvars, Cherumas. The principal Collector estimated that the Pulayars and Cherumars constituted about half of the slave population. Buchannan in 1801 stated that almost all cultivators were slaves. He stated that the slaves were primarily used for field labouring and the degree of slavery was the worst among the Parayars, Pulayans and Kuravans who were made to work like beasts. Cheruvans and Pulayans were brought to the towns to be bought and sold. The slave population increased by 65 percent in 36 years from 1806 to 1842. Children born to slaves were also made slaves. According to Dr. Francis Buchanan's estimate in 1801 AD, 41,367 people were slaves in the Malabar's south, central, and northern divisions, out of a total population of 292,366. Travancore had 164,864 slaves in 1836, out of a total population of 1,280,668. During the middle of the nineteenth century, Kerala had an estimated 4.25 lakh (425,000) slaves.

Social oppression was also part of slavery. The majority of the agrestic slaves in Southern Kerala were Parayars and Pulayars, they were not allowed to wear clean clothes and were to keep away from the roads of their masters who were Brahmin and Nairs. Major Walker stated that they were left out to nature and abandoned when they suffered from diseases and sometimes made to stand in rice fields for hours which gave them Rheumatism, Cholera and other diseases. The slaves belonged to the lower castes and were employed only for feudal work, and the stigma that they should be kept away from their masters was strictly followed. Samuel Mateer, noted that even in the working fields the slaves were supervised from a distance. The caste system kept them as untouchables and divided into numerous sub-castes. The condition of the Cherumars was no different in the 19th century, the Kerala Patrike in 1898 wrote that the Cherumar slaves had high regards for their masters because the higher castes convinced them that they were obliged at birth to serve the Higher castes.

Between 1871 and 1881, an estimated 40,000 slaves converted to Islam, according to the 1881 census. During this time, many slaves in Cochin and Travancore converted to Christianity. It was stated at the 1882 Christian Mission Conference that the population of Muslim Mapillas was rapidly expanding due to conversions from the lower strata of Hindu society, and that the entire west coast could become Muslim in such a phase.

=== 18th to 20th century ===
Between 1772 and 1833, debates in the British Parliament recorded the volume of slavery in India. A slave market was noted as operating in Calcutta, and the Company Court House permitted slave ownership to be registered, for a fee of Rs. 4.25 or Rs. 4 and 4 annas.

A number of abolitionist missionaries, including Rev. James Peggs, Rev. Howard Malcom, Sir Thomas Fowell Buxton, and William Adams offered commentaries on the Parliamentary debates, and added their own estimates of the numbers effected by, and forms of slavery in South Asia, by region and caste, in the 1830s. In a series of publications that included their: "India's Cries to British Humanity, Relative to Infanticide, British Connection with Idolatry, Ghau Murders, Suttee, Slavery, and Colonization in India", "Slavery and the slave trade in British India; with notices of the existence of these evils in the islands of Ceylon, Malacca, and Penang, drawn from official documents", and "The Law and Custom of Slavery in British India: In a Series of Letters to Thomas Fowell Buxton, Esq" tables were published detailing the estimates.

Estimates of slaves held in various East India Company territories and Native Kingdoms in the 1830s
Province or Kingdom	Est. Slaves
Malabar	147,000
Malabar and Wynad (Wayanad)	100,000
Canara, Coorg, Wynad, Cochin, and Travancore	254,000
Tinnevelly (Tirunelveli)	324,000
Trichinopoly	10,600
Arcot	20,000
Canara	80,000
Assam	11,300
Surat	3,000
Ceylon (Sri Lanka)	27,397
Penang	3,000
Sylhet and Buckergunge (Bakerganj)	80,000
Behar	22,722
Tizhoot	11,061
Southern Mahratta Country	7,500
Sub Total	1,121,585

The publications have been frequently cited by modern historians when discussing the history of slavery in India, as it included individual letters and reports discussing the practise in various regions throughout India, frequently mentioning the number of people being enslaved:

Slavery in Bombay. In Mr. Chaplin's report, made in answer to queries addressed to the collectors of districts, he says, "Slavery in the Deccan is very prevalent and we know that it has been recognized by the Hindu law, and by the custom of the country, from time immemorial'." Mr. Baber gives more definite information of the number of slaves in one of the divisions of the Bombay territory, viz., that " lying between the rivers Kistna and Toongbutra," the slaves in which he estimates at 15,000; and in the southern Mahratta country, he observes, " All the Jagheerdars, Deshwars, Zemindars, principal Brahmins, and Sahookdars, retain slaves in their domestic establishments; in fact, in every Mahratta household of consequence, they are, both male and female, especially the latter, to be found, and indeed are considered to be indispensable."

— Par. Pap. No. 128, 1834, p. 4.

James Silk Buckingham, the editor of the Calcutta Journal, published an article in 1823, that described Calcutta as:

This great capital is at once the depot of the commerce and riches of the East, and the mart in which the manacled African is sold, like the beast of the field to the highest bidder.

Historian Andrea Major noted the extent of European involvement in Indian slavery:

In fact, eighteenth century Europeans, including some Britons, were involved in buying, selling and exporting Indian slaves, transferring them around the subcontinent or to European slave colonies across the globe. Moreover, many eighteenth century European households in India included domestic slaves, with the owners' right of property over them being upheld in law. Thus, although both colonial observers and subsequent historians usually represent South Asian slavery as an indigenous institution, with which the British were only concerned as colonial reformers, until the end of the eighteenth century Europeans were deeply implicated in both slave-holding and slave-trading in the region.

— Andrea Major

==== Regulation and prohibition ====
In Bengal, the East India Company (EIC) in 1773 opted to codify the pre-existing pluralistic judicial system, with Europeans subject to common law, Muslims to the sharia based Fatawa-e-Alamgiri, and Hindus to an adaptation of a Dharmaśāstra named Manusmriti, which became known as the Hindu law, with the applicable legal traditions, and for Hindus an interpretation of verse 8.415 of the Manusmriti, regulating the practice of slavery. The EIC later passed regulations 9, and 10 of 1774, prohibiting the trade in slaves without written deed, and the sale of anyone not already enslaved, and reissued the legislation in 1789, after a Danish slave trader, Peter Horrebow, was caught, prosecuted, fined, and jailed for attempting to smuggle 150 Bengali slaves to Dutch Ceylon. The EIC subsequently issued regulations 10 of 1811, prohibiting the transport of slaves into Company territories.

When the United Kingdom abolished slavery in its overseas territories, through the 1833 Slavery Abolition Act, it excluded the non-Crown territories administered by the East India Company from the scope of the statute. The Indian Slavery Act of 1843 prohibited Company employees from owning, or dealing, along with granting limited protection under the law, that included the ability for a slave to own, transfer or inherit property, notionally benefitting the millions held in Company territory, that in an 1883 article on slavery in India and Egypt, Sir Henry Bartle Frer (who sat on the Viceroy's Council 1859–67), estimated that within the Companies territory, that did not yet extend to half the sub-continent, at the time of the act:

Comparing such information, district by district, with the very imperfect estimates of the total population fifty years ago, the lowest estimate I have been able to form of the total slave population of British India, in 1841, is between eight and nine millions of souls. The slaves set free in the British colonies on the 1st of August, 1834, were estimated at between 800,000 and 1,000,000; and the slaves in North and South America, in 1860, were estimated at 4,000,000. So that the number of human beings whose liberties and fortunes, as slaves and owners of slaves, were at stake when the emancipation of the slaves was contemplated in British India, far exceeded the number of the same classes in all the slaveholding colonies and dominions of Great Britain and America put together.

— Fortnightly Review, 1883, p. 355

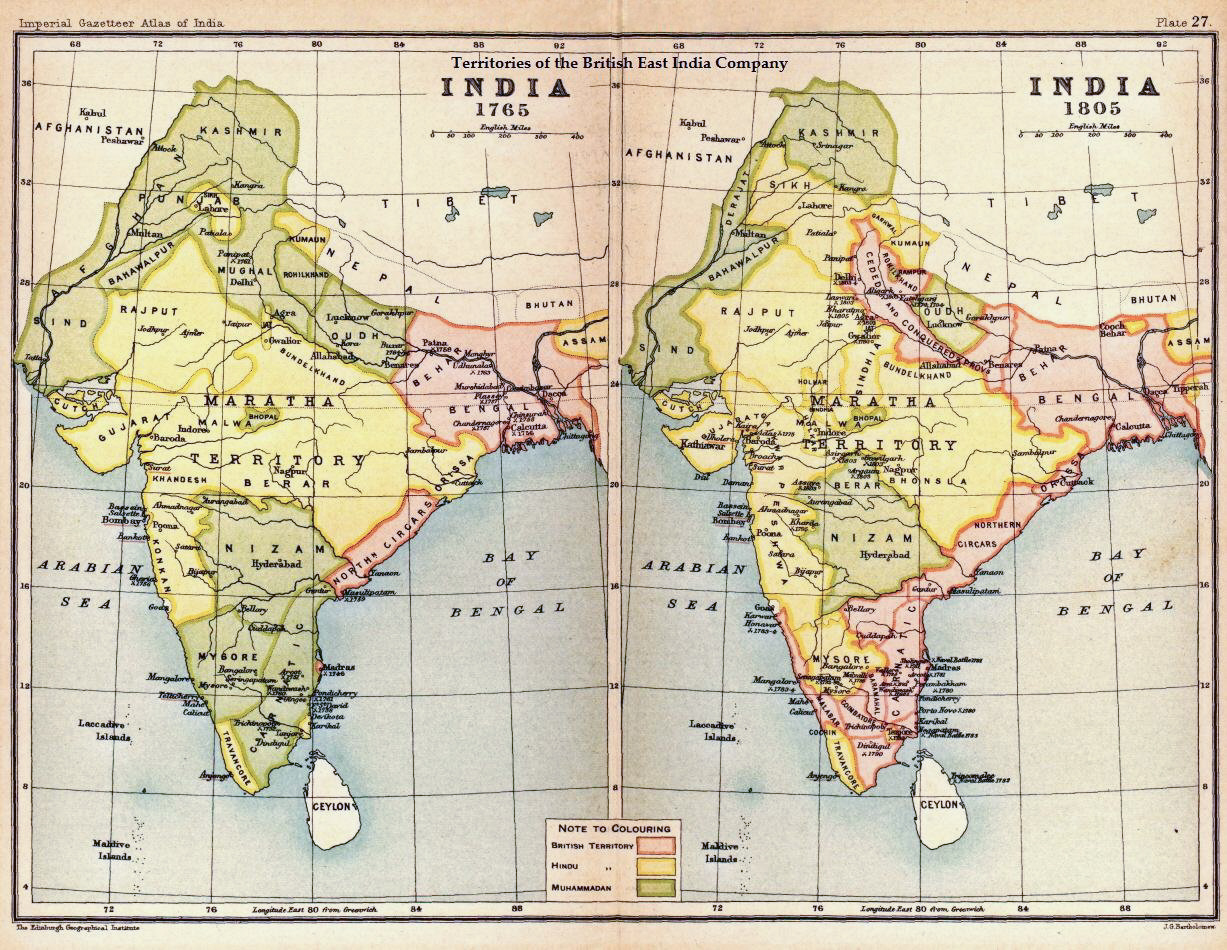

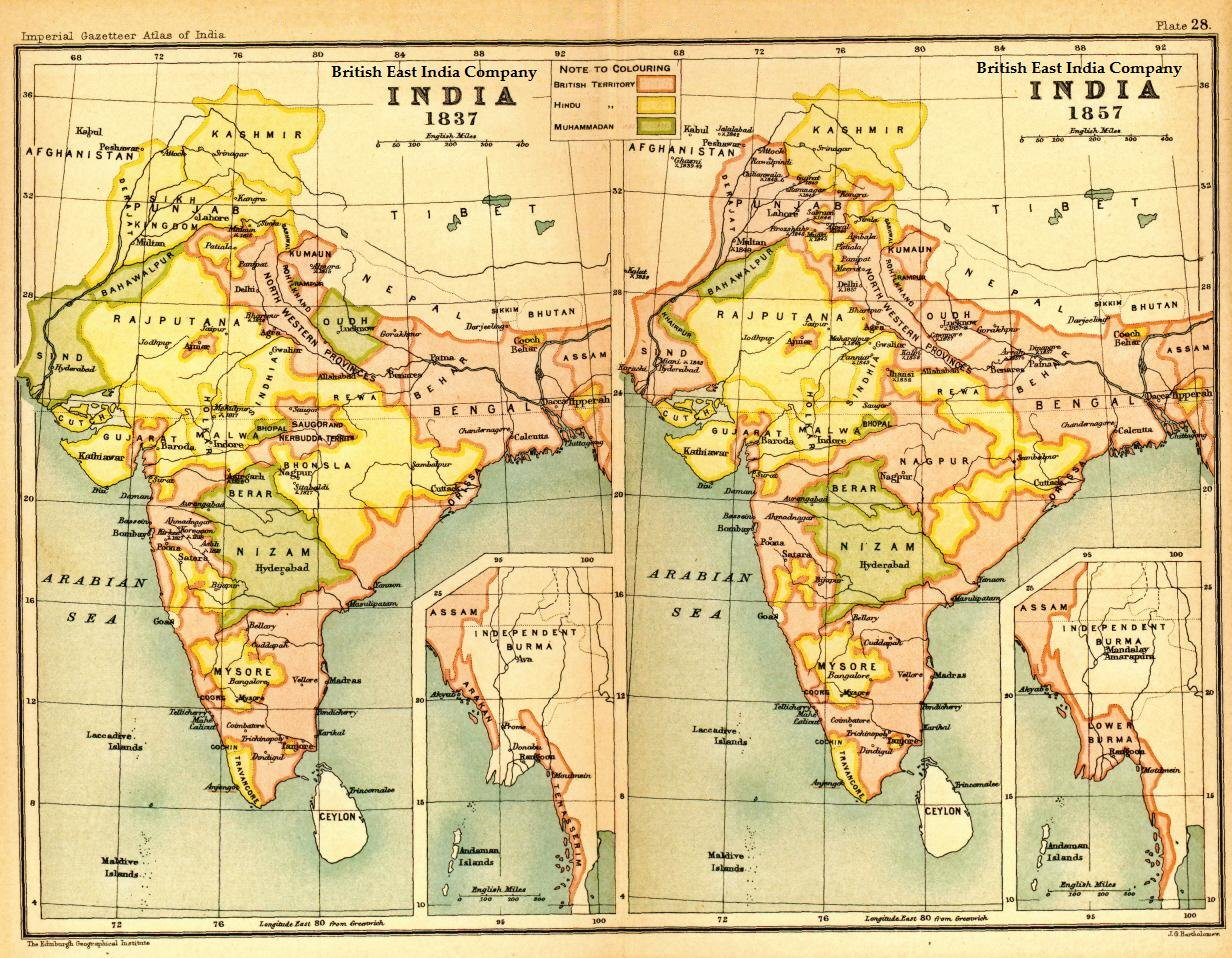
Growth of East India Company controlled territories (pink) between 1765, 1805, 1837 and 1857

When slavery was banned in the colonies of the British Empire in 1833, the ban was not introduced in India because the British areas of India were not Crown colonies but under the rule of the East India Company.

In the 1830s, most chattel slaves in India were indigenous Indian women and children, employed as domestic house servants, concubines (sex slaves) dancing girls, soldiers or agricultural laborers, while it was more common for laborers to be serfs rather than slaves; in 1841 there were reportedly an estimated 9 million slaves in India, most of them debt slaves or sold by their parents.

The policy of the British East India Company was not to outright ban slavery, but to remove all legal basis that recognized the institution; the owning of slaves were not criminalized, but slaves were no longer recognized as slaves by law and thus not prevented to leave if they did so, and the slave owners not economically compensated for their loss. However, the slaves were generally not informed about this legal change unless their owners wished to evict them; most former slaves were either kept in slavery unaware of their changed legal status; or freed but, forced to loan money from their former enslavers, transformed in to a state of de facto debt bondage to their former enslavers. The institution of slavery in India was not outright criminalized until the rule of the British East India Company was replaced by colonial rule in 1860.

British abolitionists generally termed slavery in India as benign slavery, because the majority of the Indian slaves sold themselves as slaves, and were assumed to remain voluntarily, because they could not legally be kept against their will.

Portugal gradually prohibited the importation of slaves into Portuguese India, following the 1818 Anglo-Portuguese anti slavery treaty, a subsequent 1836 Royal Edict, and a second Anglo-Portuguese treaty in 1842 reduced the external trade, but the institution itself was only prohibited in 1876.

France prohibited slavery in French India via the Proclamation of the Abolition of Slavery in the French Colonies, 27 April 1848.

===== British Indian Empire =====
Provisions of the Indian Penal Code of 1861 effectively abolished slavery in British India by making the enslavement of human beings a criminal offense. Criminalisation of the institution was required of the princely states, with the likes of the 1861 Anglo-Sikkimese treaty requiring Sikkim to outlaw the institution, though the 1891 census still recorded slave holdings in the protectorate.

Officials that inadvertently used the term "slave" would be reprimanded, but the actual practices of servitude continued unchanged. Scholar Indrani Chatterjee has termed this "abolition by denial." In the rare cases when the anti-slavery legislation was enforced, it addressed the relatively smaller practices of export and import of slaves, but it did little to address the agricultural slavery that was pervasive inland. The officials in the Madras Presidency turned a blind eye to agricultural slavery claiming that it was a benign form of bondage that was in fact preferable to free labour.

Slaves holdings, in the princely states and protectorates, continued to be recorded, tallied, and published in Census of the India summary books, decades after the institutions notional abolition, in most of the territories of the British Indian Empire. The 1891 summary page for Sikkim noting 124 male, 99 female and 103 child slaves, in the protectorate, thirty years after its prohibition in the territory. According to German ethnographer Friedrich Ratzel (1897) Abyssinian slave-girls, more precisely Oromo women, were highly sought after in India during this period.

In the 1920s, colonial officials admitted to the Temporary Slavery Commission (TSC) that chattel slavery still existed in remote areas of India where the British had little actual control, but that the institution was clearly dying. In the report of slavery in Burma and India to the Temporary Slavery Commission, the British India Office stated that the slaves in Assam Bawi in Lushai Hills were now secured the right to buy their freedom; that chattel slavery still existed in parts of Assam with weak British control; that the British negotiated with Hukawng Valley in Upper Burma to end slavery there, where the British provided loans for slaves to buy their freedom; that all slave trade had been banned, and that slavery in Upper Burma was expected to be effectively phased out by 1926.

Bhutan formally outlawed the institution in the 1950s, and Nepal its Haliya, Haruwa–charuwa, Kamaiya and kamlari systems in the 2000s.

== Indian indenture system ==
After the British government passed legislation which abolished slavery across most of its worldwide empire in 1833, the Indian indenture system arose in response to labor demands in regions which had abolished slavery. The indenture system has been compared to slavery by some historians. According to Richard Sheridan, quoting Dookhan, "[the planters] continued to apply or sanction the means of coercion common to slavery, and in this regard the Indians fared no better than the ex-slaves".

In the Indian indenture system, indentured Indian laborers were brought to regions in which slavery had been abolished to replace Africans as laborers on plantations and mines. The first ships carrying indentured labourers left India in 1836. Once they arrived at their destination, they would then be sent to work under various planters or mine owners. Their work and living conditions were frequently just as poor as the slaves they replaced, being frequently confined to their estates and being paid low salaries. Any breach of contract by them brought automatic criminal penalties and imprisonment. Many of the indentured laborers became indentured through fraudulent means, with Indians from inland regions over a thousand kilometers from seaports being promised jobs, were not told the work they were being hired for, or that they would leave their homeland and communities. They were hustled aboard the waiting ships, unprepared for the long and arduous four-month sea journey. Charles Anderson, a special magistrate investigating these sugarcane plantations, wrote to the Colonial Secretary declaring that with few exceptions, the indentured labourers were treated with "great and unjust severity"; planters enforced their Indian laborers in plantations, mining and domestic work harshly, to the extent that decaying remains of deceased laborers were frequently discovered in fields. If labourers protested and refused to work, the planters would refuse to pay and feed them.

== Contemporary slavery ==
According to the 2018 Global Slavery Index, 40.3 million people were enslaved worldwide in 2016. India accounts for almost 8 million or 20%, making it the largest contributor to modern slavery. This typically involves types of forced labor such as bonded labour, child labour, forced marriage, human trafficking, forced begging, and sexual slavery. According to the 2023 Global Slavery Index, India topped the list with 11 million people living in conditions of modern slavery.

Modern slavery in India consist of both bond slaves and indentured servitude. Over 90% of bonded labours are Dalits or Adivasis.

The existence of slavery, especially child slavery, in South Asia and the world has been alleged by various non-governmental organizations (NGO) and media outlets. With the Bonded Labour (Prohibition) Act 1976 and the International Covenant on Civil and Political Rights (concerning slavery and servitude), a spotlight has been placed on these problems in the country. One of the areas identified as problematic is granite quarries.

== See also ==
- Child labour in India
- Debt bondage in India
- History of slavery in Asia
- Indian Ocean slave trade
- Labour in India
- Veth (India), a system of forced labour
