= Indian slavery =

Indian slavery may refer to:

- Slavery in India
  - Indian Slavery Act, 1843, outlawed slavery
  - Indian indenture system, indentured servitude by Indians in British colonies
    - Girmityas, the indentured Indian laborers
- Slavery in pre-Columbian America
- Slavery among Native Americans in the United States
