= Workforce =

Labour pool in employment

The labour force participation rates of developed nations as of 2021

Ratio of female to male labor force participation rates (ILO WDI)

In macroeconomics, the workforce or labour force is the sum of people either working (i.e., the employed) or looking for work (i.e., the unemployed):

$\text{Labour force} = \text{Employed} + \text{Unemployed}$

Those neither working in the marketplace nor looking for work are out of the labour force.

The sum of the labour force and out of the labour force results in the noninstitutional civilian population, that is, the number of people who (1) work (i.e., the employed), (2) can work but do not, although they are looking for a job (i.e., the unemployed), or (3) can work but do not, and are not looking for a job (i.e., out of the labour force). Stated otherwise, the noninstitutional civilian population is the total population minus people who cannot or choose not to work (children, retirees, soldiers, and incarcerated people). The noninstitutional civilian population is the number of people potentially available for civilian employment.

$$\begin{align}
\text{Noninstitutional civilian population} &= \text{Labour force} + \text{Out of the labour force} \\
&= \text{Employed} + \text{Unemployed} + \text{Out of the labour force}  \\
&= \text{Total Population} - \text{People who cannot work}
\end{align}$$

The labour force participation rate (LFPR) is defined as the ratio of the civilian labour force to the noninstitutional civilian population.

$\text{Labour force participation rate} = \dfrac{\text{Labour force}}{\text{Noninstitutional civilian population}}$

== Formal and informal ==
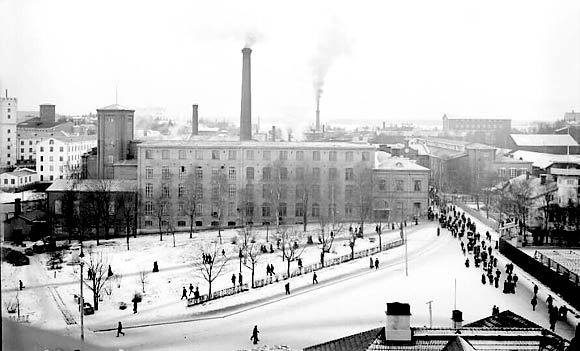
Workers leaving the Tampella factory in Tampere, Finland in 1909

Formal labour is any sort of employment that is structured and paid in a formal way. They are paid formally using payrolls paper, electronic card and alike. Unlike the informal sector of the economy, formal labour within a country contributes to that country's gross national product. Informal labour is labour that falls short of being a formal arrangement in law or in practice. Labour inherit may come as formal or non-formal, an employee old enough but below retirement age bracket passing on to his children. It can be paid or unpaid and it is always unstructured and unregulated. Formal employment is more reliable than informal employment. Generally, the former yields higher income and greater benefits and securities for both men and women.

=== Informal labour ===
The contribution of informal labourers is immense. Informal labour is expanding globally, most significantly in developing countries. According to a study done by Jacques Charmes, in the year 2000 informal labour made up 57% of non-agricultural employment, 40% of urban employment, and 83% of the new jobs in Latin America. That same year, informal labour made up 78% of non-agricultural employment, 61% of urban employment, and 93% of the new jobs in Africa. Particularly after an economic crisis, labourers tend to shift from the formal sector to the informal sector. This trend was seen after the Asian economic crisis which began in 1997.

=== Informal labour and gender ===
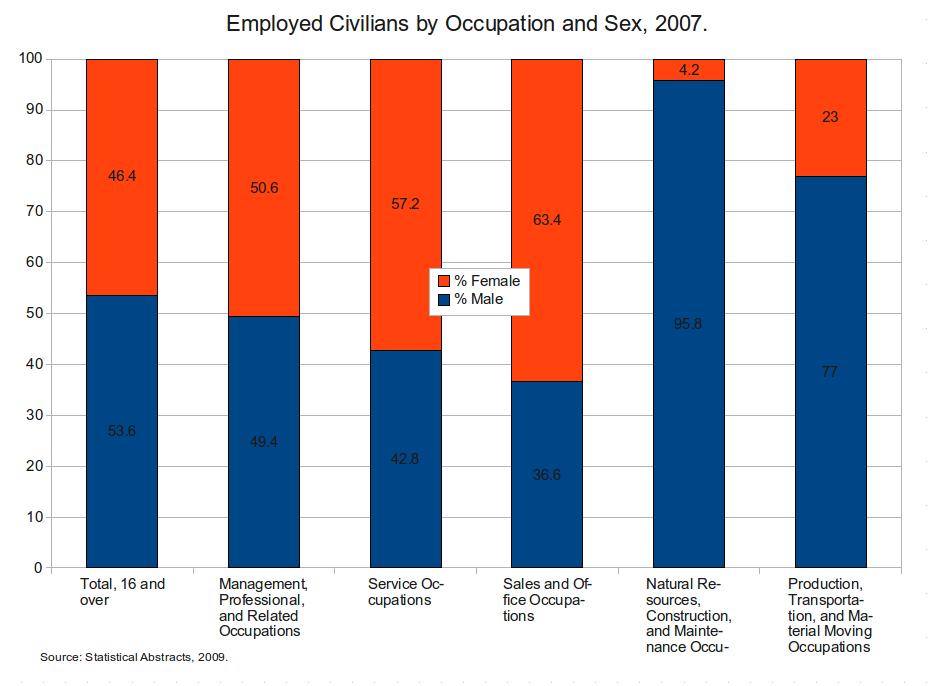
Employed civilians by occupation and gender in the United States as of 2007

Gender is frequently associated with informal labour. Women are employed more often informally than they are formally, and informal labour is an overall larger source of employment for females than it is for males. Women frequent the informal sector of the economy through occupations like home-based workers and street vendors. The Penguin Atlas of Women in the World shows that in the 1990s, 81% of women in Benin were street vendors, 55% in Guatemala, 44% in Mexico, 33% in Kenya, and 14% in India. Overall, 60% of women workers in the developing world are employed in the informal sector.

The specific percentages are 84% and 58% for women in Sub-Saharan Africa and Latin America respectively. The percentages for men in both of these areas of the world are lower, amounting to 63% and 48% respectively. In Asia, 65% of women workers and 65% of men workers are employed in the informal sector. Globally, a large percentage of women that are formally employed also work in the informal sector behind the scenes. These women make up the hidden work force.

According to a 2021 FAO study, currently, 85 percent of economic activity in Africa is conducted in the informal sector where women account for nearly 90 percent of the informal labour force. According to the ILO's 2016 employment analysis, 64 percent of informal employment is in agriculture (relative to industry and services) in sub-Saharan Africa. Women have higher rates of informal employment than men with 92 percent of women workers in informal employment versus 86 percent of men.

Formal and informal labour can be divided into the subcategories of agricultural work and non-agricultural work. Martha Chen et al. believe these four categories of labour are closely related to one another. A majority of agricultural work is informal, which the Penguin Atlas for Women in the World defines as unregistered or unstructured. Non-agricultural work can also be informal. According to Martha Chen et al., informal labour makes up 48% of non-agricultural work in North Africa, 51% in Latin America, 65% in Asia, and 72% in Sub-Saharan Africa.

Agriculture and informal economic activity are among some of the most important sources of livelihood for women. Women are estimated to account for approximately 70 percent of informal cross-border traders and are also prevalent among owners of micro, small, or medium-sized enterprises (MSMEs). MSMEs are more vulnerable to market shocks and market disruptions. For women-owned MSMEs this is often compounded by their lack of access to credit and financial liquidity compared to larger businesses. However, MSMEs are often more vulnerable to market shocks and market disruptions. For women-owned MSMEs, this is often compounded by their lack of access to credit and financial liquidity compared to larger businesses..

== Agricultural work ==
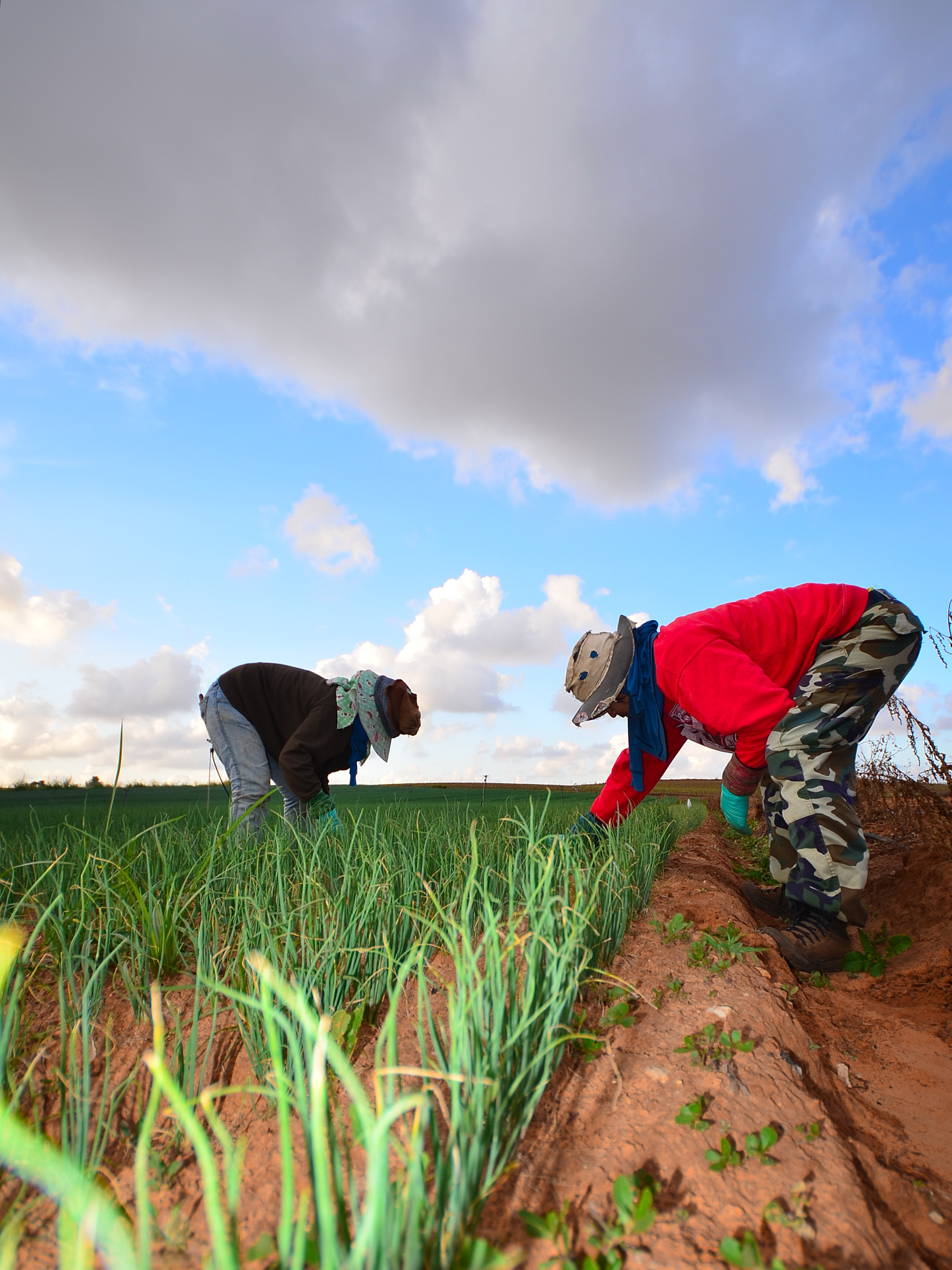
Two farm workers cleaning and picking at an onion field, location unknown

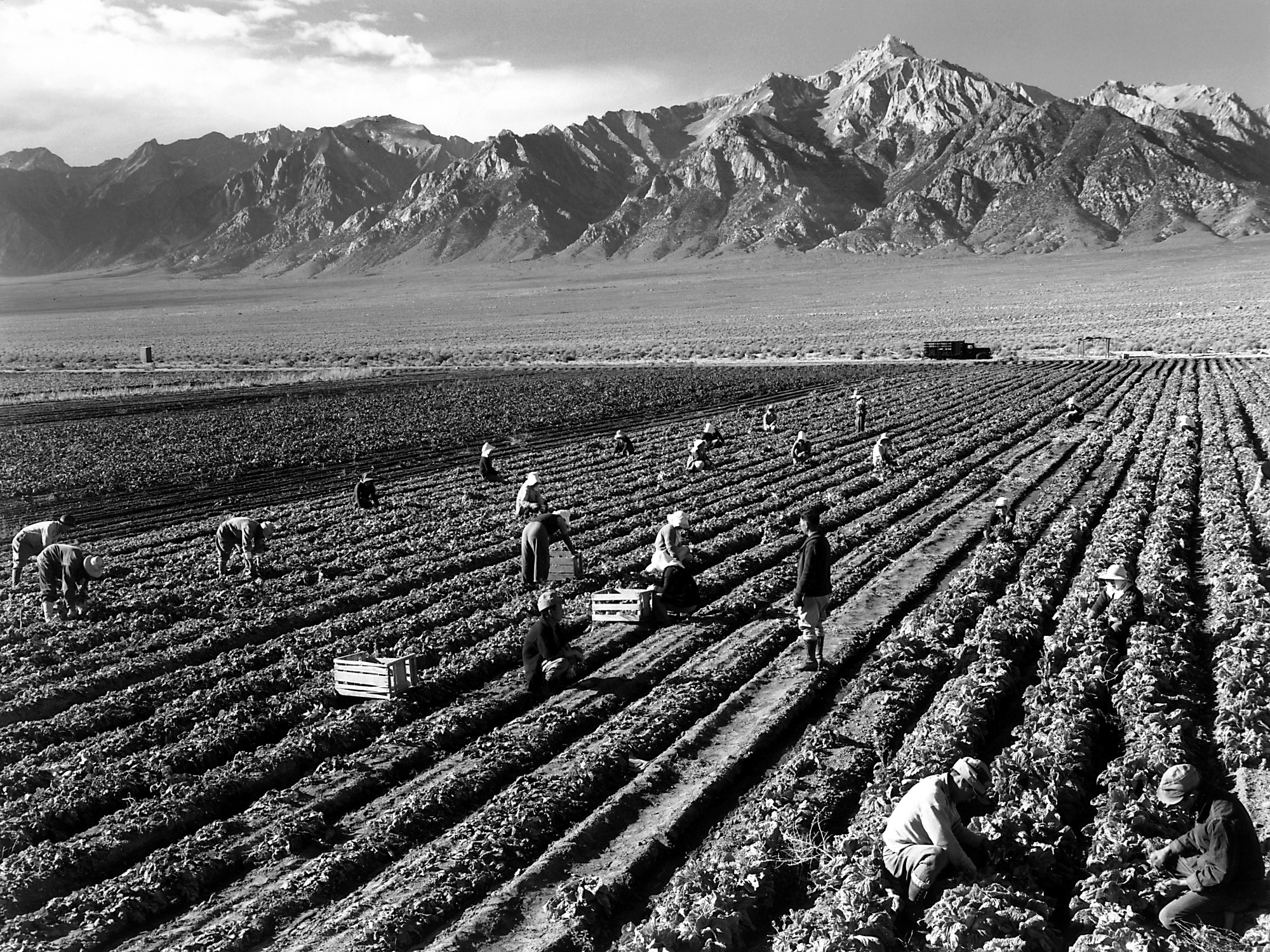
Farm workers on a field near Mount Williamson in Inyo County, California. This photograph is by Ansel Adams.

A farmworker or farmhand, is someone employed for labor in agriculture. In labor law, the term "farmworker" is sometimes used more narrowly, applying only to a hired worker involved in agricultural production, including harvesting. Agricultural work varies widely depending on context, degree of mechanization and crop. Low wages for farmworkers have been associated with farmworker shortages and delayed adoption of agricultural technology.

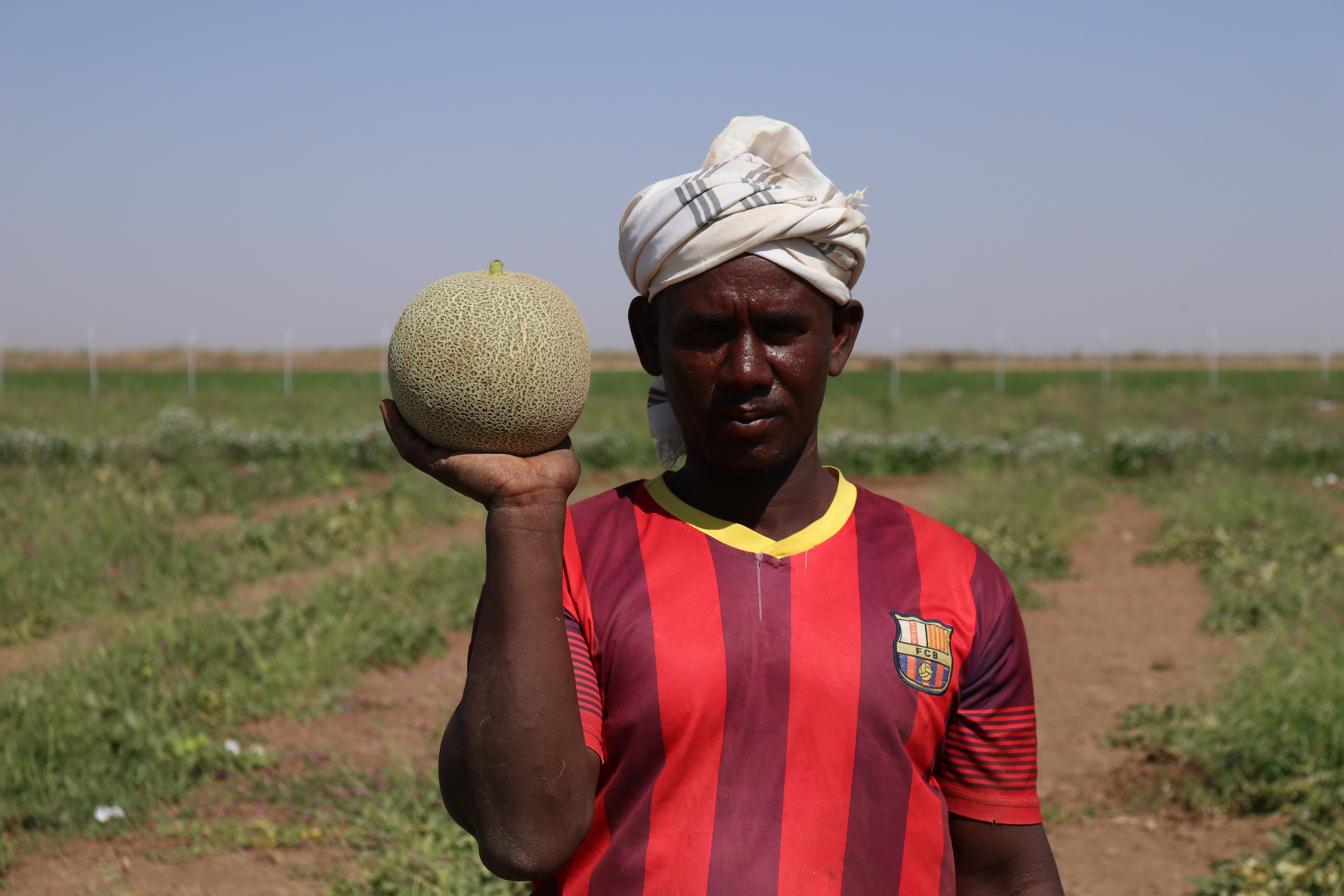
Sudanese farmer reviews cantaloupe production, south of Khartoum.

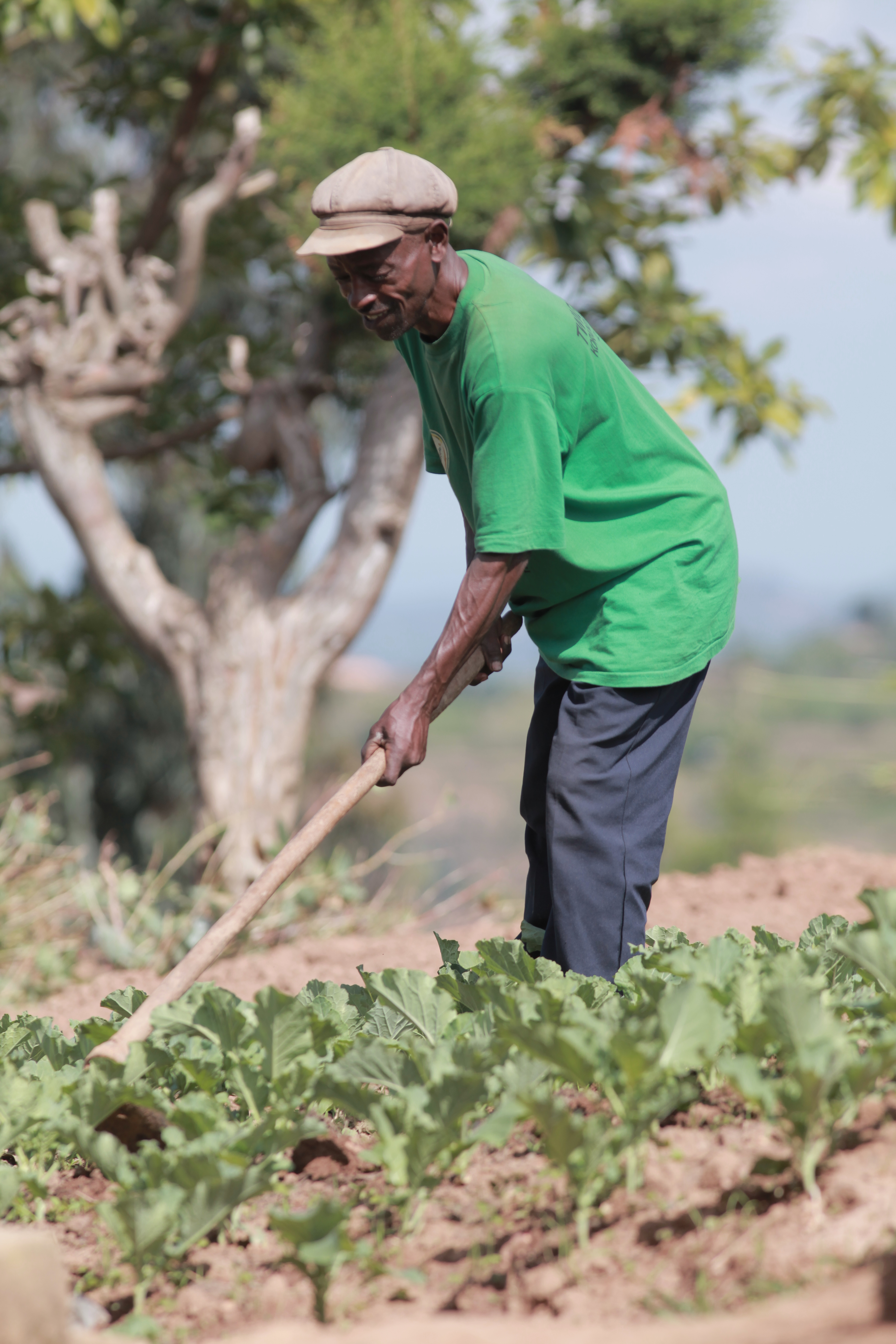
A Rwandan farmworker

Farmworkers in Nigeria making ridges

Agricultural labor is often affected by the human health impacts of environmental issues related to agriculture, such as health effects of pesticides or exposure to other health challenges such as valley fever. To address these environmental concerns and marginal working conditions, many labor rights, economic justice and environmental justice movements have been organized or supported by farmworkers.

== Paid and unpaid ==
Paid and unpaid work are also closely related with formal and informal labour. Some informal work is unpaid, or paid under the table. Unpaid work can be work that is done at home to sustain a family, like child care work, or actual habitual daily labour that is not monetarily rewarded, like working the fields. Unpaid workers have zero earnings, and although their work is valuable, it is hard to estimate its value. Men and women tend to work in different areas of the economy, regardless of whether their work is paid or unpaid. Women focus on the service sector, while men focus on the industrial sector.

=== Unpaid work and gender ===
Women usually work fewer hours in income generating jobs than men do. Often it is housework that is unpaid. Worldwide, women and girls are responsible for a great amount of household work.

The Penguin Atlas of Women in the World, published in 2008, stated that in Madagascar, women spend 20 hours per week on housework, while men spend only two. In Mexico, women spend 33 hours and men spend 5 hours. In Mongolia the housework hours amount to 27 and 12 for women and men respectively. In Spain, women spend 26 hours on housework and men spend 4 hours. Only in the Netherlands do men spend 10% more time than women do on activities within the home or for the household.

The Penguin Atlas of Women in the World also stated that in developing countries, women and girls spend a significant amount of time fetching water for the week, while men do not. For example, in Malawi women spend 6.3 hours per week fetching water, while men spend 43 minutes. Girls in Malawi spend 3.3 hours per week fetching water, and boys spend 1.1 hours. Even if women and men both spend time on household work and other unpaid activities, this work is also gendered.

=== Sick leave and gender ===
In the United Kingdom in 2014, two-thirds of workers on long-term sick leave were women, despite women only constituting half of the workforce, even after excluding maternity leave.

== Globalisation of the labour market ==
The global supply of labour almost doubled in absolute numbers between the 1980s and early 2000s, with half of that growth coming from Asia. At the same time, the rate at which new workers entered the workforce in the Western world began to decline. The growing pool of global labour is accessed by employers in more advanced economies through various methods, including imports of goods, offshoring of production, and immigration. Global labor arbitrage, the practice of accessing the lowest-cost workers from all parts of the world, is partly a result of this enormous growth in the workforce. While most of the absolute increase in this global labour supply consisted of less-educated workers (those without higher education), the relative supply of workers with higher education increased by about 50 percent during the same period. From 1980 to 2010, the global workforce grew from 1.2 to 2.9 billion people. According to a 2012 report by the McKinsey Global Institute, this was caused mostly by developing nations, where there was a "farm to factory" transition. Non-farming jobs grew from 54 percent in 1980 to almost 73 percent in 2010. This industrialization took an estimated 620 million people out of poverty and contributed to the economic development of China, India and others.

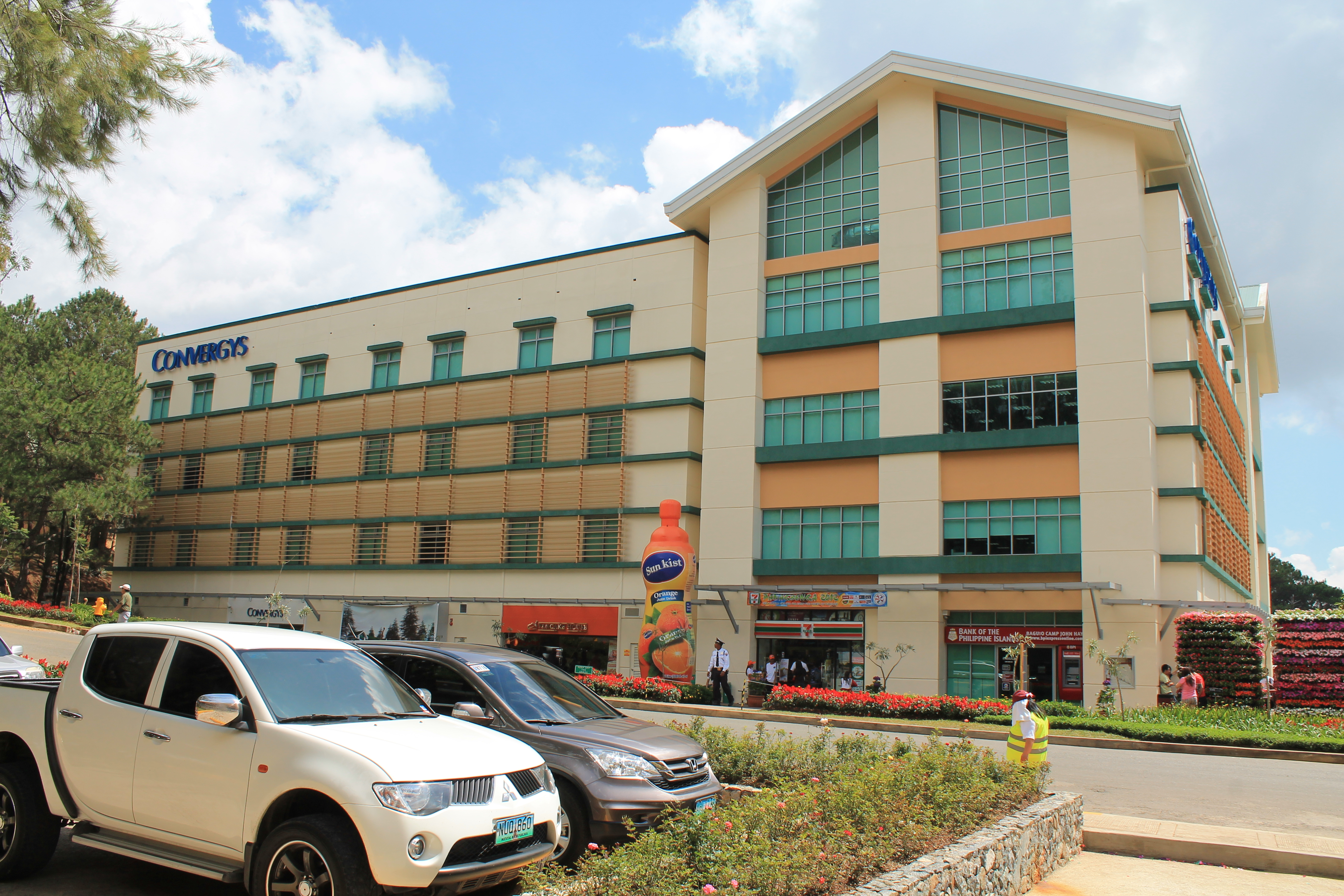
Convergys call center in Baguio, the Philippines (example of a third party outsourcing firm)

Under the "old" international division of labor, until around 1970, underdeveloped areas were incorporated into the world economy principally as suppliers of minerals and agricultural commodities. However, as developing economies are merged into the world economy, more production takes place in these economies. This has led to a trend of transference, or what is also known as the "global industrial shift ", in which production processes are relocated from developed countries (such as the US, European countries, and Japan) to developing countries in Asia (such as China, Vietnam, and India), Mexico and Central America. This is because companies search for the cheapest locations to manufacture and assemble components, so low-cost labor-intensive parts of the manufacturing process are shifted to the developing world where costs are substantially lower.

But not only manufacturing processes are shifted to the developing world. The growth of offshore outsourcing of IT-enabled services (such as offshore custom software development and business process outsourcing) is linked to the availability of large amounts of reliable and affordable communication infrastructure following the telecommunication and Internet expansion of the late 1990s.

== See also ==
- Collective bargaining – Negotiations between employers and a group of employees
- Contingent workforce – Non-permanent type of employment
- Critique of work – Critique of, or wish to abolish, labour
- Designation of workers by collar color – Employment classification
- Division of labour – Separation of tasks in any system so that participants may specialise
- Employment-to-population ratio – Statistical ratio; proportion of a working age population that is employed
- Female labor force in the Muslim world – Involvement of Muslim women in labor
- Feminisation of poverty – Poverty phenomena that most frequently affect women
- Human capital – Economics concept involving knowledge, skills, and training
- Labour economics – Study of the markets for wage labour
- List of countries by labor force
- List of countries by sector composition of the labor force
- Proletariat – Class of wage-earners
- Unemployment – People without work and actively seeking work
- Women in the workforce – All women who perform some kind of job
- Working class – Social class of people working for a living

== Sources ==
This article incorporates text from a free content work. Licensed under CC BY-SA 3.0 (license statement/permission). Text taken from Seizing the opportunities of the African Continental Free Trade Area for the economic empowerment of women in agriculture, FAO, FAO.
