= List of countries by sector composition of the labor force =

This is a list of countries by sector composition of the labor force in 2023, mostly based on World Bank.

* indicates "Labor in COUNTRY or TERRITORY" or "Economy of COUNTRY or TERRITORY" links.

Country / territory	Agriculture (%)	Industry (%)	Services (%)
Afghanistan *	45.5	18.4	36.1
Albania *	34.9	21.2	43.9
Algeria *	9.3	30.8	59.9
Angola *	56.2	5.6	38.2
Argentina *	0.6	23.0	76.4
Armenia *	52.3	14.1	33.6
Australia *	2.1	19.1	78.7
Austria *	3.1	25.7	71.2
Azerbaijan *	35.5	14.8	49.7
Bahamas *	2.9	12.2	84.9
Bahrain *	0.9	34.7	64.5
Bangladesh *	35.3	20.9	43.8
Barbados *	2.6	16.6	80.8
Belarus *	10.0	31.1	58.9
Belgium *	1.1	19.4	79.5
Belize *	15.6	17.8	66.5
Benin *	28.0	22.0	50.0
Bhutan *	43.8	15.3	40.9
Bolivia *	24.4	20.5	55.1
Bosnia and Herzegovina *	17.6	30.6	51.8
Botswana *	18.0	15.8	66.2
Brazil *	8.2	20.2	71.6
Brunei *	1.5	21.4	77.1
Bulgaria *	5.7	29.6	64.7
Burkina Faso *	31.4	22.6	46.0
Burundi *	85.1	3.1	11.9
Cape Verde *	9.9	21.7	68.4
Cambodia *	36.0	26.9	37.1
Cameroon *	43.4	14.9	41.7
Canada *	1.3	19.2	79.5
Central African Republic *	70.5	6.4	23.0
Chad *	69.1	9.6	21.4
Channel Islands	2.3	17.8	79.9
Chile *	6.2	22.1	71.7
China *	22.3	31.8	45.8
Colombia *	14.4	20.0	65.6
Comoros *	34.4	14.8	50.7
Congo *	30.2	23.2	46.7
Costa Rica *	13.4	20.2	66.4
Croatia *	4.7	27.5	67.9
Cuba *	17.1	16.0	66.9
Cyprus *	2.4	16.3	81.4
Czech Republic *	2.7	35.7	61.6
Denmark *	2.0	19.3	78.7
Djibouti *	1.1	6.0	92.9
Dominican Republic *	7.4	19.2	73.4
DR Congo *	55.1	9.8	35.2
Ecuador *	30.0	17.5	52.5
Egypt *	18.7	28.6	52.7
El Salvador *	14.8	23.4	61.9
Equatorial Guinea *	55.9	12.7	31.4
Eritrea *	60.9	9.1	30.1
Estonia *	2.6	27.4	70.0
Eswatini *	13.8	18.5	67.8
Ethiopia *	62.4	6.5	31.2
European Union *	3.8	24.2	72.0
Fiji *	28.1	14.3	57.6
Finland *	3.6	21.6	74.8
France *	2.5	19.2	78.2
French Polynesia *	2.1	14.6	83.4
Gabon *	29.2	15.7	55.1
Gambia *	29.1	18.6	52.3
Georgia *	39.9	13.6	46.5
Germany *	1.2	26.5	72.3
Ghana *	35.4	17.7	46.9
Greece *	11.5	16.0	72.6
Guam *	0.2	13.1	86.6
Guatemala *	26.7	21.9	51.4
Guinea *	58.2	7.0	34.8
Guinea-Bissau *	50.0	10.3	39.7
Guyana *	11.3	25.8	62.9
Haiti *	44.7	12.5	42.9
Honduras *	22.6	21.4	56.1
Hong Kong *	0.2	14.0	85.8
Hungary *	4.4	31.2	64.4
Iceland *	3.7	18.3	78.0
India *	43.5	25.0	31.5
Indonesia *	28.8	22.1	49.1
Iran *	14.3	35.0	50.7
Iraq *	8.2	27.6	64.2
Ireland *	4.0	18.4	77.6
Israel *	0.8	15.6	83.6
Italy *	3.6	26.6	69.8
Ivory Coast *	45.2	10.4	44.4
Jamaica *	14.6	17.6	67.8
Japan *	3.0	23.7	73.3
Jordan *	3.2	18.3	78.4
Kazakhstan *	12.1	21.6	66.3
Kenya *	32.3	15.6	52.2
Kuwait *	1.9	24.9	73.1
Kyrgyzstan *	23.9	24.7	51.5
Laos *	69.6	7.3	23.0
Latvia *	6.8	22.9	70.3
Lebanon *	3.4	20.3	76.2
Lesotho *	29.2	34.9	36.0
Liberia *	38.9	8.2	52.9
Libya *	8.7	23.2	68.1
Lithuania *	5.1	25.8	69.1
Luxembourg *	0.9	9.6	89.5
Macau *	0.5	14.4	85.1
Madagascar *	69.4	10.1	20.5
Malawi *	61.7	8.0	30.3
Malaysia *	9.8	27.8	62.4
Maldives *	7.7	25.0	67.3
Mali *	67.8	10.3	22.0
Malta *	1.1	17.6	81.3
Mauritania *	32.7	14.7	52.6
Mauritius *	5.3	23.0	71.7
Mexico *	12.0	25.0	63.0
Moldova *	51.1	13.3	35.5
Mongolia *	26.1	23.4	50.5
Montenegro *	6.0	16.1	77.8
Morocco *	29.6	24.1	46.3
Mozambique *	69.5	9.1	21.5
Myanmar *	45.2	18.7	36.1
Namibia *	21.5	16.3	62.2
Nepal *	61.2	17.6	21.2
Netherlands *	1.9	14.1	84.0
New Caledonia *	1.8	22.3	75.9
New Zealand *	5.6	20.5	73.9
Nicaragua *	27.7	18.1	54.2
Niger *	70.6	7.1	22.2
Nigeria *	34.3	17.9	47.8
North Korea *	46.8	14.3	38.8
North Macedonia *	9.3	30.2	60.5
Norway *	2.5	18.9	78.5
Oman *	6.1	40.2	53.7
Pakistan *	36.1	25.6	38.3
Panama *	14.7	17.5	67.8
Papua New Guinea *	38.7	7.9	53.4
Paraguay *	17.2	18.0	64.8
Peru *	24.0	16.4	59.7
Philippines *	22.4	18.5	59.2
Poland *	7.6	29.6	62.8
Portugal *	2.9	25.0	72.1
Puerto Rico *	1.2	12.0	86.8
Qatar *	1.7	39.4	58.9
Romania *	17.9	33.2	48.9
Russia *	5.7	26.4	67.9
Rwanda *	54.8	14.5	30.7
Samoa *	30.2	13.8	56.0
São Tomé and Príncipe *	11.1	22.7	66.2
Saudi Arabia *	2.8	16.3	80.8
Senegal *	21.6	22.3	56.1
Serbia *	19.2	28.2	52.6
Sierra Leone *	43.0	11.6	45.3
Singapore *	0.1	14.4	85.5
Slovakia *	2.4	34.9	62.7
Slovenia *	4.0	32.2	63.8
Solomon Islands *	37.6	10.6	51.8
Somalia *	26.0	17.9	56.1
South Africa *	18.8	17.7	63.5
South Korea *	5.3	24.0	70.7
South Sudan *	59.2	13.7	27.0
Spain *	3.6	19.9	76.5
Sri Lanka *	26.3	26.4	47.3
Saint Lucia *	10.4	17.0	72.6
Saint Vincent and the Grenadines *	9.6	18.9	71.5
Suriname *	7.4	26.3	66.3
Sweden *	1.8	17.3	80.9
Switzerland *	1.9	19.9	78.2
Syria *	15.0	21.8	63.1
Tajikistan *	42.7	20.1	37.1
Tanzania *	65.4	8.4	26.2
Thailand *	30.1	22.1	47.8
Timor-Leste *	36.8	11.1	52.1
Togo *	30.3	20.1	49.6
Tonga *	26.3	27.4	46.3
Trinidad and Tobago *	2.9	26.9	70.1
Tunisia *	12.8	33.3	53.8
Turkey *	14.6	27.6	57.8
Turkmenistan *	22.2	33.7	44.1
Uganda *	65.9	7.1	27.0
United Arab Emirates *	1.3	29.6	69.0
United Kingdom *	1.0	17.8	81.2
United States *	1.6	19.3	79.1
Uruguay *	8.7	19.0	72.3
U.S. Virgin Islands *	1.3	15.8	82.9
Uzbekistan *	13.9	27.9	58.2
Vanuatu *	43.6	12.2	44.2
Venezuela *	10.6	18.5	70.9
Vietnam *	33.0	31.2	35.8
Yemen *	28.6	11.2	60.2
Zambia *	55.4	9.9	34.7
Zimbabwe *	52.5	12.3	35.1
World	26.1	23.7	50.2
