= Labour in Nepal =

Overview of workforce in Nepal, workers' rights, labour laws and challenges

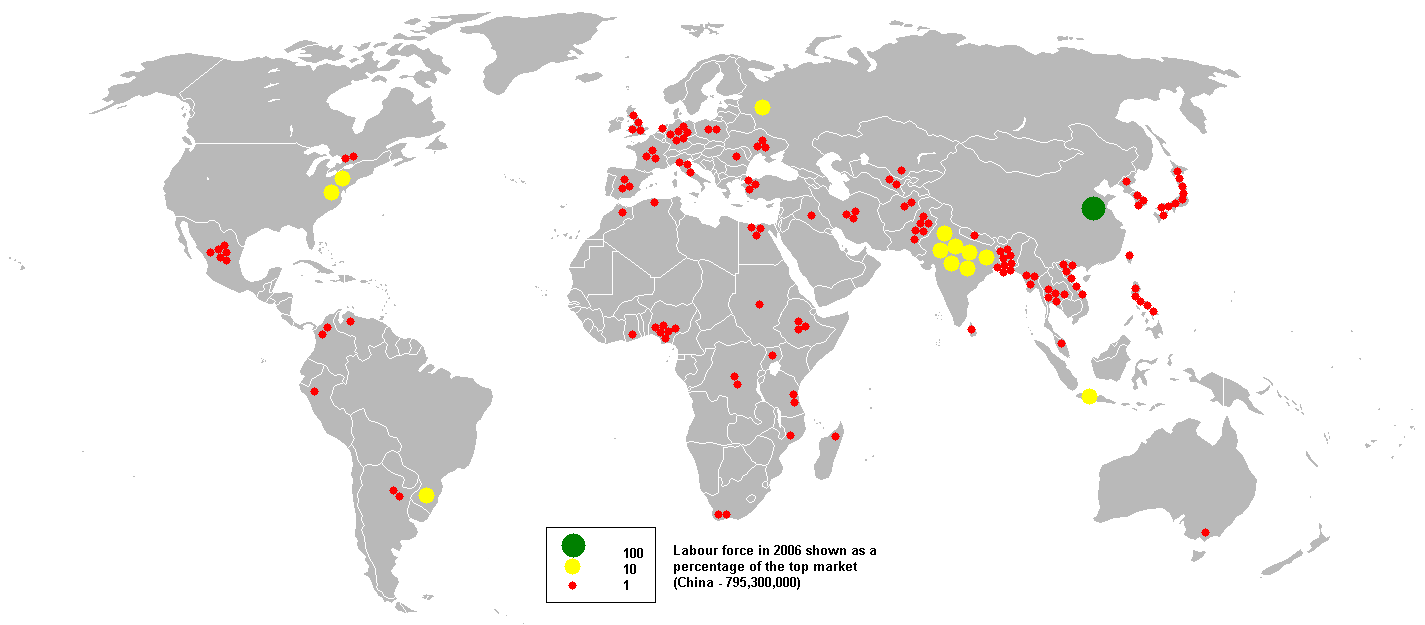
Labour force availability (as of 2006) map

Nepal has a labour force of 16.8 million workers, the 37th largest in the world as of 2017. Although agriculture makes up only about 28 per cent of Nepal's GDP, it employs more than two-thirds of the workforce. Millions of men work as unskilled labourers in foreign countries, leaving the household, agriculture, and raising of children to women alone. Most of the working-age women are employed in the agricultural sector, contributions to which are usually ignored or undervalued in official statistics. Few women who are employed in the formal sectors face discrimination and significant wage gap. Almost half of all children are economically active, half of which (almost a quarter of all children) are child labourers. Millions of people, men, women and children of both sexes, are employed as bonded labourers, in slavery-like conditions. Trade unions have played a significant role in bringing about better working conditions and workers' rights, both at the company level and the national government level. Worker-friendly labour laws, endorsed by the labour unions as well as business owners, provide a framework for better working conditions and secure future for the employees, but their implementation is severely lacking in practice. Among the highly educated, there is a significant brain-drain, posing a significant hurdle in fulfilling the demand for skilled workforce in the country.

The Ministry of Labour, Employment and Social Security governs the development of labour and employment policies in Nepal.

== Overview ==
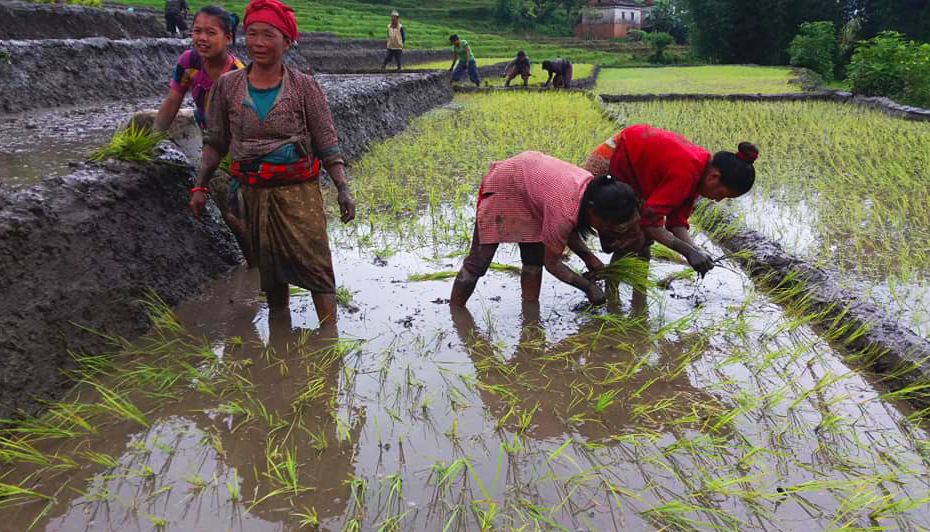
Men prepare the paddy fields and women transplant rice seedlings (rural Nepal)

Nepal is one of the least developed countries in the world, with a severe shortage of skilled labour. The unemployment rate is high. Millions of unskilled labourers work abroad, primarily in the GCC countries and Malaysia, contributing around 28 per cent of the country's total GDP. On the other hand, thousands of well-educated and skilled workforce emigrates to the developed countries in the Americas, Europe and Australasia. As many as 66.5 per cent of men and 59.7 per cent of women employed in Nepal, are employed in the informal sector. According to the labour force survey of 2008, only 16.9 per cent of the employment was in wage employment, with the rest identifying as self-employed.

== Women in the workforce ==
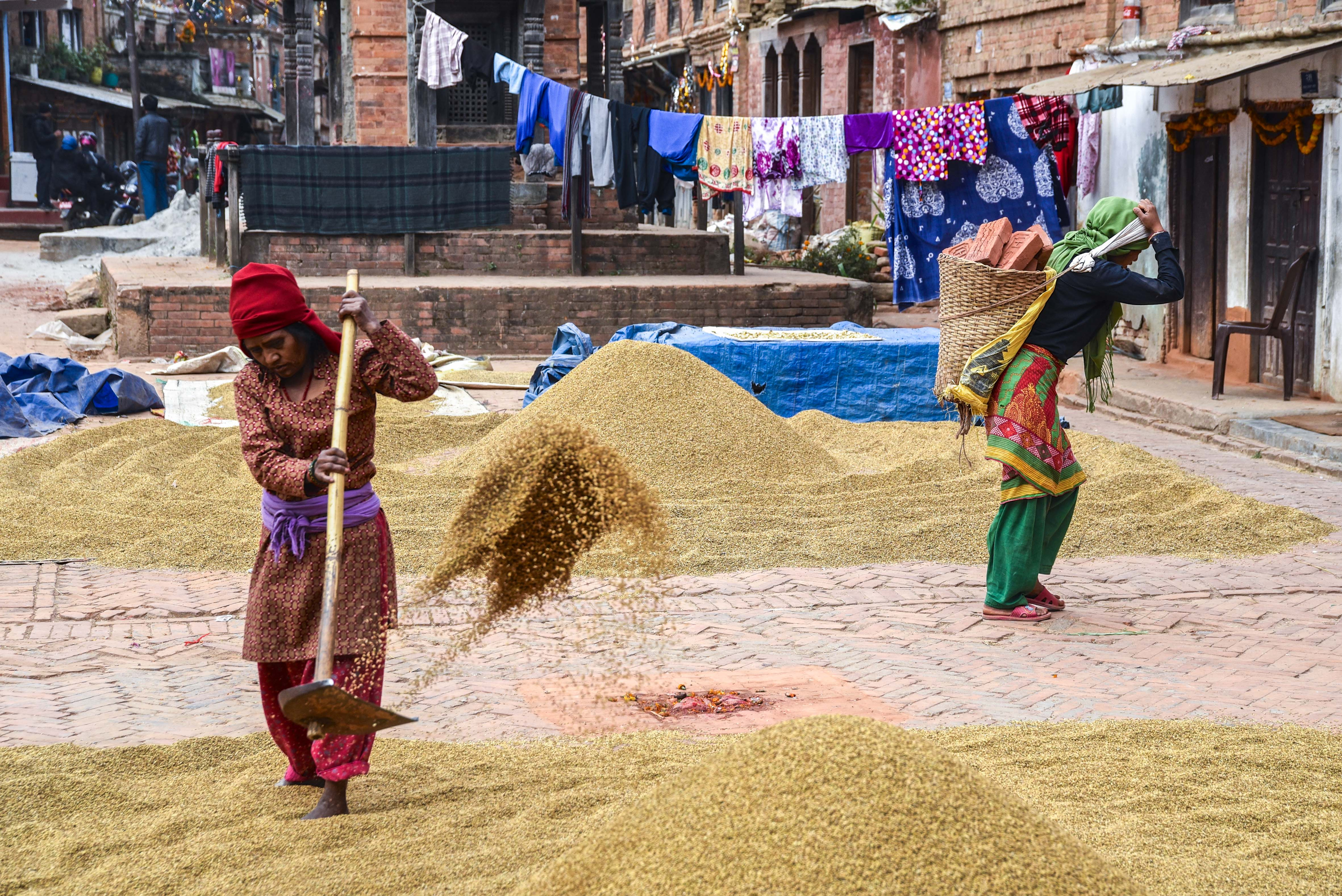
A Nepali woman scatters paddy with a hoe as another carrying a basketful of bricks passes by.

According to Nepal labour force survey 2017-18, Nepal has 125 working-age women for every 100 such men. However, only 22.5 per cent of the working-age women are employed. Of the 11.53 million working-age women, 8.5 million are in the labour force (employed or seeking employment), with only 2.6 million of them actually employed. The low figure of employment is mostly attributed to the fact that women employed in subsistence farming (making no recorded profits) as well as homemakers were counted among the unemployed. Women form the majority of the workforce in the agricultural sector, most of which is ignored in the statistics. Because of continued outmigration of men from rural agricultural villages, women have been forced to take complete responsibility of the household which includes growing crops, animal husbandry, household chores and raising children. 73.9 per cent of the population employed in agriculture was composed of 84.3 per cent of all working women compared to 62.2 per cent for men.

Women, on average, are paid 30 percent less salary compared to men, regardless of profession. Women are preferred for elementary level and non-technical jobs while men are hired for higher positions and technical jobs. There is a trend of hiring men for leadership positions and women as their deputies. Fewer women acquire higher or technical education and they are also subjected to "family penalty", discrimination based on the assumption that motherhood will lead to decreased productivity among women workers in the long term.

== Child labour ==
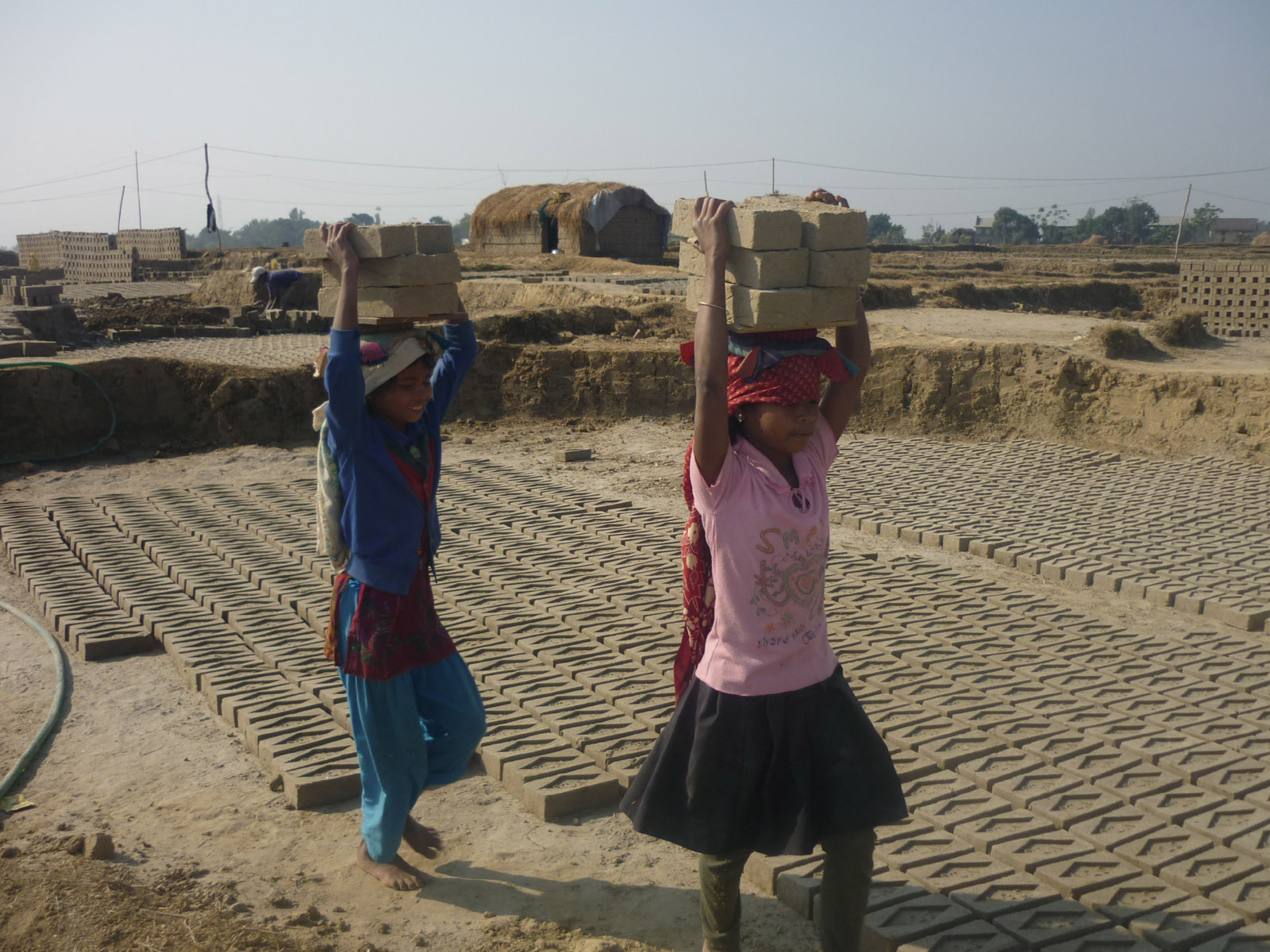
Two Nepalese girls working in a brick factory carry sun-dried bricks on their heads.

The incidence of child labour in Nepal is relatively high compared with other countries in South Asia. Nepal enacted the Child Labour Act 1992 and ratified the ILO Conventions no. 138 and 182, making child labour a criminal offence. However, in practice, millions of children are working as child labourers. According to the Nepal Labour Force Survey (NLFS) in 2008, 40.4 per cent of the child population was economically active, with 51 per cent of it being child labour.

Brick factories are considered a hub for child labour in Nepal. According to a 2017 study, nearly 300,000 children were employed by the 1,100 brick factories throughout Nepal. A series of discussions between the brick factory owners and the government in 2018, led to the signing of an agreement to end child labour in the sector. The president of the Federation of Nepal Brick Industries expressed a commitment to end child labour by 2025.

Some child labourers, particularly in the agricultural sector in the Terai and in the households of affluent families throughout the country, are employed in slavery-like conditions. Charuwa, a form of bonded child labour common in the Terai, has children employed as caretakers of cattle, who work up to 16 hours a day with no opportunity for education. Kamlaris, the young girls from western Terai who are employed as domestic helpers, having been auctioned off by their family to rich landlords, in a tradition now officially banned but alive in practice due to extreme poverty in the affected families, face inhumane living conditions, violence and abuse.

On 9 July 2018, the federal government endorsed a 10-year "master plan" to end all child labour by 2028.

== Bonded labour ==
Slavery was officially abolished by the Rana regime in 1925. However, bonded labour has persisted in Nepal, in other forms.

=== Kamaiya-kamlari system ===
In western Nepal, kamaiyas are male workers, usually of Tharu or Dalit caste groups, bonded to a landlord owing to debt whose interests mount at a rate higher than can be paid with labourer's wage; the indenture is inherited by the subsequent generations as the debt is never paid. It was abolished, and more than 11,000 labourers freed, in 2000. However, the system is believed to still persist in practice as many freed kamaiyas have begun returning to their former landlords, as law-enforcement isn't strict, and freed labourers lack other opportunities for livelihood.

Kamlaris are young girls, as young as six, sold by their parents as indentured servants to higher-caste, land-owning families to repay debts. As the payment is made to the parents, the kamlaris are slaves to the landlord for the duration of the contract, and are subject to violence and abuse. Many kamlaris are sold off repeatedly each year, and so spend many years in slavery. The practice was officially banned in 2013, and more than 12,000 kamalaris freed, but it still exists in some parts of the country, as freed Kamlaris from families in extreme poverty have begun returning to their former landlords.

=== Haruwa-charuwa system ===
In the Terai, the Haruwa-Charuwa system which employs many bonded labourers includes indebted men called haruwas, who are employed to take care of the farms, mainly sowing, growing and harvesting crops in payment of debt or under unfair contracts, whose wife and children are also forced to work for the landlord, as domestic workers, cattle rearers and helpers in the farms, and children, usually of the haruwas, employed as charuwas, who take care of the cattle, cleaning the shed, milking and selling milk, gathering grass and fodder, taking the cattle for grazing (charuwa means "one who grazes cattle") and even helping out elsewhere when not busy with the cattle.

=== Haliya system ===
Haliyas are indentured labourers in the farms of the western hills, who are forced to work for other landowners as they are themselves landless, and are forced to incur debt from the landlords for their livelihood, which they can never completely repay due to the rates at which the interests accumulate. The whole family is bonded to the landlords, and the indentured status is passed from father to son for many generations. The system was abolished, and thousands of labourers freed, in 2008. However, due to the failure of the rehabilitation efforts, many haliyas are reported to have gone back to their former landlords to make their living.

== Immigrant labour ==
Indians make up the bulk of the immigrant labour force. Indian workers were exempt from requiring a work permit to live and work in Nepal until 2019. So, Nepal does not have any data on the number of Indians living and working in Nepal. However, the Indian government puts the number of non-resident Indians in Nepal at 600,000. Most of the workers from India and rest of South Asia are usually employed in unskilled or low-skilled jobs. In recent years, the number of immigrants from South Asia and elsewhere, applying for a work permit for employment in high-skilled jobs has been increasing. These workers number a few thousands, almost half of them from China, while the United Kingdom is at distant second.

== Labour laws ==
=== Minimum wage ===
The Social Security Act that came into force in 2017 set minimum monthly wage for industrial workers at Rs 13,450, a daily minimum wage at Rs 517, and an hourly minimum at Rs 69. Minimum additional entitlements include provident fund and gratuity contributions worth 18.33 per cent of basic wage, festival allowances worth 8.33 per cent of basic wage, as well as planned increases to maternity support, health and accident insurances, taking the total minimum additional entitlements to around Rs 2,500.

=== Worker safety and welfare ===
Any enterprise with more than 20 employee must establish a Health and Safety Committee with representation from the workers. Enterprises with more than 50 employees are required to provide a break room and canteen, whereas a child care center is mandated, either by itself or jointly with another, for companies that employ more than 50 female workers.

=== Foreign workers ===
An enterprise may employ foreign workers not exceeding 5 per cent of the total workforce. Labour permit may be obtained for a maximum of 3 to 5 years depending on the skill level, with a potential for extension of up to two additional years from the Ministry of Labour.

== History of labour laws ==
Labour Act 2048 was enacted following the re-establishment of democracy through the People's movement 1990. Labour Rules 2050 (1993) provided additional guidance on the Labour Act 2048. Labour Act 2048 was repealed by Nepal Labour Act 2074, enacted in 2017, following the establishment of the federal republic and drafting of the new constitution. The new Labour Act also repealed Retirement Fund Act 2042 (1985) and Industrial Trainee Act 2039 (1982). Labour Rules 2075 which provides additional guidance on the Labour Act 2074 was enacted on 27 May 2018. It repealed and replaced Labour Rules 2050 as the supplement to the Labour Act.

== Labour unions and worker rights ==
The history of worker rights campaigns and trade unions in Nepal, begins with the Biratnagar Mills Workers' Association, which under the leadership of democratic revolutionaries from Nepali Congress and Communist Party of Nepal, were able to organise a strike for the first time on 4 March 1947, beginning the revolution for democracy that successfully toppled the Rana regime and established constitutional monarchy in 1951. In the short term, they were successful in persuading the Rana regime to increase their wages by 15 per cent, and full wages for the duration of the strike. After the establishment of democracy, the union split into All Nepal Trade Union Congress and Nepal Trade Union Congress, and rapidly polarised as leftist and non-leftist during the cold war. Many independent industry-based workers' unions came into being in the late 1970s and early 1980s in the tourism, transport and hospitality sectors. On 20 July 1989, most of these unions came together to form the General Federation of Nepalese Trade Unions (GEFONT). By 1996, the CPN UML affiliated GEFONT and Nepali Congress affiliated Nepal Trade Union Congress (NTUC) were the only two recognised confederations of trade unions. After the maoist party entered the peace process in 2006, its affiliate trade union, the All Nepal Federation of Trade Unions (ANFTU) entered as the third major trade union confederation. However, following the merger of CPN UML and CPN (Maoist Centre), GEFONT and ANFTU are in the process of negotiating a merger.

Trade unions work together with investors, NGOs, INGOs and the government in developing policies, laws, rules and regulations related to worker welfare. On the other, due to highly politicized trade unions, they are failed to contribute to overall economic growth for the country.[33,34] However, the labor force in Nepal projects itself very powerful in terms of system framework as per the Labor Act of 2017, Nepal against growing decline of work force across the world.[35]

== Further study ==
- Tulachan, B.P. (2019), "Change, no change or big change? The discontinuous development of trade unions in Nepal", Employee Relations, Vol. 41 No. 6, pp. 1364-1378. https://doi.org/10.1108/ER-02-2018-0041
- Tulachan, B. P., & Felver, T. B. (2019). The evolution of industrial relations in Nepal: a biological evolutionary perspective. Labor History, 60(2), 126–143.https://doi.org/10.1080/0023656X.2019.1537030
- Tulachan, B.P. (2020), "Why is the Nepalese labor force so strong in a global context of decline? Shedding light on the unexplored characteristics of Nepalese labor relations", Employee Relations, Vol. ahead-of-print No. ahead-of-print. https://doi.org/10.1108/ER-02-2020-0068
