= Haruwa–charuwa system =

Forced labour practice of south-eastern Nepal

The haruwa–charuwa system is a forced-labour system based on debt bondage, prevalent in the agricultural sector of the eastern Terai region in Nepal. Haruwa means "forced tiller" and are usually adult males, while charuwa means "forced cattle-herder" and are usually women and children. The victims of this bonded labour system are usually Dalit families, most commonly from the Musahar caste. Due to landlessness and poverty, they are forced into service of landowner families under slavery-like conditions. The haruwa–charuwa system is similar to the Haliya and Kamaiya systems of western Nepal.

Another term, kodarwa, is often used to refer to strong men who cultivate the lands of landlords for wages or payment of debt, similar to haruwas. The written or oral contracts under which the haruwas, charuwas and kodarwas are employed are referred to as laguwas. Even when only the patriarch of the family is contracted as a haruwa, the women and children are forced to work for the same landlord for little or no payment; such a woman worker is referred to as jaan.

== Practice ==
Families in extreme poverty, usually from the historically disadvantaged castes, enter into a haruwa–charuwa contract with landowners, called jamindars or girahats, forced by economic circumstance. Mushahars are the principal caste groups working as haruwa–charuwas; other such groups are Ram, Khatwe and Paswan castes. Some families become haruwa–charuwas when they are forced to seek a loan due to an emergency. Due to a lack of bargaining power, they are forced to accept outrageous interest rates, often compounded, which means that the debt can never be repaid via labour. Such a debt-bonded haruwa–charuwa relationship lasts a life time and is usually inherited by the children of the indebted families as well. A less egregious form of haruwa–charuwa practice involves families in extreme poverty working on a temporary or seasonal basis under unfair contracts.

While many charuwas are women and children of a haruwa's family, others are exclusively cattle herding labourers working under similar conditions as haruwas. Such charuwas herd and graze cattle of many families in the village in exchange for some grains paid annually. In recent years, inter-generational haruwa–girahat relationships are less prevalent. However, most haruwas are still found to exhaust their whole life in service of a single landlord once they enter such a relationship. They are paid subsistence wages in cash or grains. As such, they can not afford medical treatments, education and other necessities beyond food and shelter. A tenth of the labourers are forced to work even when seriously ill or injured. They are also likely to face wage deduction or non-payment of wages, including when sick or injured. Some are obliged to find and pay for a replacement when they are incapacitated. They are not allowed to work outside of the landlord's estate. They also suffer from wage deduction for poor productivity or other reasons as well as delayed or non-payment of wages. As they can not make any savings during their working age, most haruwa–charuwas find themselves in a precarious position when they grow old.

The only recourse for haruwa–charuwas who want to leave their masters is to seek loan from another landlord to repay the loan to their current master and enter into servitude of the new landlord.

In some communities, haruwa–charuwas enter the service of a landlord under an annual contract on a designated auspicious day, such as Shree Panchami. They receive a patch of land as payment; the crops they grow on that patch for the year are theirs. Such land is often the least fertile of the landlord's estate or the most flood-prone. They also receive a daily wage of a few kilos of grain on days they work for the landlords, however they are not allowed to seek employment elsewhere when the landlord doesn't need them.

There is a very high incidence of forced child labour, often unpaid, including children under the age of ten, among the haruwa–charuwa families, who are often also subjected to emotional and physical as well as sexual abuse. Those children who do not have to work for the landlords are instead sent to work in industries or the service sectors in urban areas, chiefly brick kilns and restaurants. Children suffer from communicable diseases due to poor sanitation as well as malnutrition.

== Prevalence ==
According to a 2009 ILO estimate, about 94% of haruwa–charuwa and haliya families are employed as forced labour. A 2006 ILO/IPEC survey of nine VDCs in three districts found a total of around 1,600 haruwa–charuwa families. A Freedom Fund survey estimated the number of bonded labourers under the haruwa–charuwa system nationwide at around 97,000 adults and 13,000 children. It is most prevalent in the Sunsari, Saptari, Siraha, Dhanusa, Sarlahi, Bara and Rautahat districts of eastern Terai. A 2013 ILO report estimated a total of 69,738 haruwa–charuwa families in these seven districts, about 9% of the total households in these districts. Among the seven districts, Dhanusha, Siraha and Saptari, which have a greater density of Dalit populations, have a greater prevalence rate. Dalits account for two-thirds of all haruwa–charuwa labourers. Around 23% of the total Dalit households and 7% of the total Muslims households are haruwa–charuwas in these districts.

== Status ==
According to James A. R. Nafziger, the haruwa–charuwa system falls under the category of forced/compulsory labour practices prohibited by the ILO's Forced Labour Convention of 1930. As a signatory to the convention, Nepal is obligated to eliminate the practice. However, Nepal has failed to enforce a ban on bonded labour. Nepal has previously categorically abolished the kamaiya and haliya systems and freed thousands of bonded labourers, many of whom have begun to return to their former masters due to severe poverty and lack of alternative opportunities for livelihood. By contrast, haruwa–charuwa labourers have never been specifically declared freed, although Nepali constitution and laws prohibit forced and bonded labour in general, with the Kamaiya Labour (Prohibitions) Act 2002 specifically having declared a ban on forced labour, including as haruwa–charuwas. The interim constitution of 2007 stipulated a policy for upliftment of marginalised communities including haruwa–charuwas; however, it has not resulted in any concrete programmes. In the annual budget for economic year 2011–12, the government had included provisions for education and employment of haruwa–charuwa communities and for providing loans at affordable rates for self-employment. However, no programmes were launched to officially document and identify haruwa–charuwas and therefore, they could not benefit from any such programmes. Haruwa–charuwas have not been able to benefit from similar such programmes of subsequent years that target the economically marginalised communities and freed forced labourers, for the same reason.

Haruwa–charuwas are mostly landless and live in huts designated by the landlords or otherwise in the land under public ownership. These communities are therefore largely overlooked for development of infrastructure. According to an ILO survey, a third of haruwa–charuwa families reside in places which are not their own homes, 37% are landless and an additional 40% near-landless.

== Initiatives ==
The government relies on support programmes for the upliftment of haruwa–charuwa families in partnerships with various organisations. Starting in 2008, the International Labour Organisation in partnership with the Government of Nepal, ran programmes to increase education and deter child labour among haruwa–charuwa communities, among others. Thirty-six million dollars were allocated for the programme which included withdrawal of haruwa–charuwa children from child labour and enrollment into formal education or out-of-school Programmes (OSP), non-formal education (NFE) and pre-vocational training for older children as well as literacy training, vocational training and group-dynamics training for haruwa–charuwa adults. The programme aimed at sustainable elimination of child labour and reintegration of families under forced-labour systems as free and economically independent members of the society. The Samudayik Bikas Manch runs a haruwa–charuwa upliftment programme under which it has run citizenship drives to help adults acquire their citizenship certificates, helped families toward economic independence with goat-rearing and other self-employment opportunities as well as school-enrollment and coaching of children and adult literacy classes for adults.

Since the reestablishment of democracy in 2006, haruwa–charuwa communities have begun organising and campaigning for their rights. The Haruwa–Charuwa Rights Forum is one such grassroots organisation that campaigns for haruwa–charuwa rights.
