= Kunlun Nu people =

Term used for dark-skinned people in Tang Dynasty-China

Kunlun Nu was a term used for dark skinned people from Southeast Asia in the Tang Dynasty. Later, Kunlun Nu was used to refer to African slaves in China. The Kunlun Nu arrived in China through the Arab slave trade and remained largely in royal courts and rich people’s households. Their unique physical traits and superb physical abilities raised attention from Chinese authors, who associated them with mythical powers in novels like Taiping Guangji and Kunlun Nu. These traits also incited negative attention from some Chinese authors, as descriptions of "devil slaves" became prominent in certain texts.

== Origin ==
The origin of the widespread usage of “Kunlun” comes from Zanj slaves in China. In 1535, Portuguese traders used weaponry to gain permission from the Ming dynasty to trade at Macau. This agreement technically did not let the Portuguese settle around Macau, but by 1640, there was a Portuguese population of 2,000 people and a majority-African slave population of 5,000 slaves. There were no restrictions on the bondage of sub-Saharan Africans in China, which made the Zanj slave trade more prominent. In addition to the Portuguese traders, Arab traders also brought East African slaves into China. Arabs controlled the Chinese import of slaves from the eighth to the fourteenth century. Arab communities in China, specifically Guangzhou, owned slaves and aided their transport.

== Etymology ==
The term “Kunlun” appears in China during the early centuries of the Common Era and was related to the mythical Kunlun mountain range, which was a Taoist haven, according to legend. The term's usage changed from the mountain range to people with darker skin than the Chinese as time progress, although there is no clear beginning of this transition away from Taoist influence. Originally, Kunlun referred to populations in Indonesia that did not assimilate into Indian culture, but eventually extended to most East Asian people. Trade with India during the Han dynasty also allowed for more interactions between the Chinese and foreign groups, further increasing Kunlun's usage.

=== Tang Dynasty ===
Gradually, during the Tang dynasty, Kunlun became associated with all people who have darker skin than the Chinese. This broad definition caused confusion, as Chinese people themselves were occasionally referred to as Kunlun. Although the association of Kunlun with darker skinned people gained popularity, it is unlikely that Chinese people traveled to Africa during this time. The lack of travel leaves room for error and exaggeration in depictions of the Kunlun.

The definition of the Kunlun Nu evolved to gain negative meanings in some forms of literature. The term “devil slaves” appears in primary sources from Zhu Yu to relate the Kunlun people to wild animals. The Kunlun were described as having incredible strength but lacking intellect. To reinforce their point, Yu states that the languages of the Kunlun people are inhuman. The Chinese attributed this language barrier as them lacking intelligence. Guang Zhiyi, written by Wang Shixing, references Kunlun slaves as entirely subservient to their masters. Shixing describes the Kunlun Nu as essentially unable to think without the lead of their master. The Kunlun Nu followed all instructions from only their master, even if the instruction was to take their own life. The term “devil slaves” does not cover all Kunlun people. "Devil slave" only refers to Africans who could open their eyes underwater.

Kunlun did not only take on negative meanings. Many writers, including Zhao Rugua, highlight the Kunlun’s mythological powers. Zhao showcases these powers, such as healing and the ability to change form, of the Kunlun slaves throughout his writing. When describing swimming, Zhao shifts the connotation of the Kunlun to experts of the water rather than devils in human form.

=== Yuan Dynasty ===
Mongol rule in China under the Yuan dynasty encouraged greater exploration and interest in China's neighboring countries. During this period of increased interest, the use of Kunlun continued to change. Kunlun reverted back to its use as a reference to geological locations off the coast of Vietnam, similar to the definition during the Ming dynasty. When referring to people, Kunlun did not specifically reference skin color or magic abilities, but the term did retain it's nonhuman, primitive description of Southeast Asian people.

As descriptions transitioned to African people, many of the patterns remained the same. Authors avoid descriptions of skin color, magic powers, or slavery in Africa. Instead, the writing focusses on observations on the land and traditions of African people without imposing judgement. The writings depict foreign countries that do not hold any mythological significance. Traveller Wang Dayuan's account of the Kunlun people in his book Daoyi Zhilüe provided the Yuan dynasty with reliable information based on his personal voyages to Africa. This work reinforced the Yuan Dynasty's practical view of the Kunlun Nu, as Dayuan avoided magical powers and skin color.

== Perception in Art ==
=== Taiping Guangji ===
In Taiping Guangji, a Kunlun named Mo Junhe is presented to the emperor, who is immediately struck by his skin color. The emperor remarks that Mo Junhe’s surname, "Mo," meaning “ink,” mirrors his appearance. Subsequently, the emperor refers to him as "Kunlun" and gifts him black clothes. This suggests that the term "Kunlun" had become commonly associated with dark-skinned people, and black individuals were viewed as exotic. However, in a later story, a mother observes that her son, born with dark skin, could grow up to be as valiant as Mo Kunlun, indicating that Chinese people during this era did not associate negative qualities with dark skin.

In another story from the Taiping Guangji, a slave girl named Xiao Jin dreamed of asking an old man for help. The old man responded to her request to heal her back and waist pain by summoning a Kunlun and placing his fingers in the Kunlun’s palm, which stained the old man’s fingers black. The old man then applied this "elixir" to Xiao Jin’s back, and upon waking, she found her pain had ceased. This story links the Kunlun’s exotic physical features to the power of healing, imbuing them with mysterious qualities.

Several stories in the Taiping Guangji document the Kunlun’s ability to dive deep into the water and retrieve treasures. In one such tale, Tao Xian, a man who owns a Kunlun slave, forces the slave to recover a jade sword from a lake inhabited by a dragon. The Kunlun is killed, but the moral of the story criticizes Tao’s greed. Nevertheless, Chinese writers of this period commonly associated Kunluns with exceptional physical abilities, such as deep diving.

=== Kunlun Nu ===
Kunluns can also be portrayed in a more positive light, beyond being sacrificed to their master’s greed. In the Tang story Kunlun Nu, a Kunlun slave named Mo Le assists his master, Cui, in pursuing a lover. As the hero of the tale, Mo offers Cui his help to win over a singing concubine, using his cunning and strength to enable his master to escape before the officials arrive. This story casts the Kunlun in a positive role, highlighting Mo Le’s exceptional strength and praising his resolve and cleverness.
