= Haliya =

Nepali agricultural bonded labourer

A Haliya (Nepali: हलिया) is an agricultural bonded labourer who works on another person's land. The literal meaning of Haliya is "one who ploughs". Haliyas can be found throughout Nepal. But the Haliya system in the far western hilly part of Nepal is considered a bonded labour system.

As of September 2008, the system has been abolished by the Nepalese Government. The effectiveness of this abolition, however, has been questioned.

== See also ==
- Haruwa–charuwa system
- Kamaiya and kamlari
