= Indian Slavery Act, 1843 =

Act passed in British India, outlawing economical transactions associated with slavery

Governor-General of India in Council
- Long title: An Act for declaring and amending the Law regarding the condition of Slavery within the Territories of the East India Company.
- Citation: Act V of 1843
- Enacted by: Governor-General of India in Council
- Enacted: 7 April 1843

Repealed by
- Repealing and Amending Act, 1952
- Status: Repealed

Indian Slavery Act, 1843

The Indian Slavery Act, 1843 (Act V of 1843), was an act passed in British India under East India Company rule, which outlawed many economic transactions associated with slavery.

The act states how the sale of any person as a slave was banned, and anyone buying or selling slaves would be prosecuted under the law, the offence carrying a strict punishment.

== Implementation and effect ==
Some East India Company officials opposed the act, citing Hindu and Muslim customs and maintaining the fact that the act would be seen as interference in traditional social structures. Evangelical politicians who had led successful slavery abolition campaigns in the West Indies prevailed and the Act was implemented.

Historians are divided on whether the Act was able to exclude caste and slavery. The condition of workers in tea plantations in Tamil Nadu and Assam were compared to that of African, West Indian counterparts who worked in sugar plantations. Lack of alternatives meant tea plantation workers had become indentured labourers despite the Act, which historian Amalendu Guha maintained was a new form of slavery.

A 1996 Human Rights Watch report refers to Manjari Dingwaney's book, Unredeemed Promises: The Law and Servitude, and states:

Various forms of debt bondage co-existed with formal slavery, and while the British abolished slavery legislatively through the Anti-Slavery Act of 1843, large numbers of former slaves traded their status for that of perpetually bonded servitude. This was in part due to the fact that the British did not abolish debt-bondage; instead, they regulated it.

== Text ==
ACT No. V. OF 1843
(Passed on the 7th April, 1843)
An Act for declaring and amending the Law regarding the condition of Slavery within the Territories of the East India Company.
1. No public officer shall in execution of any decree or order of Court, or for the enforcement of any demand of rent or revenue, sell or cause to be sold any person, or the right to the compulsory labour or services of any person on the ground that such person is in a state of slavery.
2. No rights arising out of an alleged property in the person and services of another as a slave shall be enforced by any Civil or Criminal Court or Magistrate within the territories of the East India Company.
3. No person who may have acquired property by his own industry, or by the exercise of any art, calling or profession, or by inheritance, assignment, gift or bequest, shall be dispossessed of such property or prevented from taking possession thereof on the ground that such person or that the person from whom the property may have been derived was a slave.
4. Any act which would be a penal offence if done to a free man shall be equally an offence if done to any person on the pretext of his being in a condition of slavery.

== See also ==
- Abolition of slavery timeline
- Indian indenture system
- Slavery Abolition Act 1833
- Slavery in India
