= Kamaiya and kamlari =

Traditional systems of bonded labour in Nepal

Kamaiya and Kamlari (also called Kamana) were two traditional systems of bonded labour practised in the western Terai of Nepal. Both were abolished after protests, in 2000 and 2006 respectively.

== Origins ==
The system of bonded labour existed in Nepal since the 18th century; following the unification of Nepal, members of the ruling elite received land grants in the Terai and were entitled to collect revenue from those who cultivated the land.

The Kamaiya system bonds males to labour, and the Kamlari system bonds females.

== Kamaiya system ==
=== Kamaiya history ===
Traditionally, people without land or work could get loans from landowners allowing them to sustain a minimum livelihood. In exchange for this, they had to live and work on the landowner's land as quasi slaves. Exorbitant debts were charged, and whole families were forced to slave labour for years and even generations, bonded by indebtedness to the landowner and bonded by unequal social relations to sell labour in lieu of the loan taken.

Following the eradication of malaria in the Terai region in the 1950–1960s, the large influx of hill migrants marginalized traditionally landowning Tharu people by occupying their lands. While the Tharus had no records of the land they were cultivating, the settlers registered the land in their name, forcing the Tharus to work as agricultural labourers. The customary practice of obtaining a "helping hand for family business" was gradually replaced by the forced labour system called Kamaiya, which in Tharu parlance is tantamount to hardworking hired farm labour. The Kamaiya system existed in particular in western Nepal and affects especially the Tharu people and Dalits.

=== Kamaiya abolition ===
Increasing protests against the kamaiya system, organized by the "Kamaiya movement", led to its abolition in 2000. On 17 July that year, the Government of Nepal announced the Kamaiya system be banned, all Kamaiyas be freed and their debts be cancelled. Although most Kamaiya families were freed, the system has persisted. Many Kamaiyas were evicted by their former landlords and released into poverty without support. Others received unproductive land.

To alleviate the poverty of the affected people – the main cause of the system – rehabilitation and distribution of land were promised to ex-Kamaiya families. To put action behind the attempts to discuss the land issue with the government, the ex-Kamaiyas started occupying land in Kailali and Bardiya districts in the winter of 2005–06. But a decade after being liberated, the freed Kamaiyas are forced to live a very difficult life as the government has still not fulfilled its promises of providing a proper rehabilitation and relief package.

== Kamlari system ==
=== Practice ===
In its modern form, girls and young women are sold by their parents into indentured servitude under contract for periods of one year with richer, higher-caste buyers, generally from outside their villages.

=== Campaigns for kamlari abolition ===
Several activist groups including the Nepal Youth Foundation (NYF) and the Friends of Needy Children (FNC) have campaigned for abolition of the system since 2000, and worked to free kamlaris by paying off their parents' debts. On 10 September 2006, the Supreme Court of Nepal affirmed that this practice known as kamlari was illegal, and that former kamlaris were entitled to governmental compensation, education and rehabilitation. However, the interim-government of Nepal (formed during the last stage of the Nepalese Civil War following the successful April 2006 revolution against the autocratic monarchy) failed to comply with the Supreme Court's ruling, and the practice continued to exist.

Anti-kamlari organisations launched new campaigns and protests to demand the government to comply, which in 2009 resulted in financial compensation for freed kamlaris. The system was still not abolished, however, and thousands of girls served forcefully for several more years. Various charitable organizations have mitigated the kamlari practice by offering grants larger than prospective masters to families who promise not to sell their daughters, as well as funds for the girls' education.

The next year the Freed Kamlari Development Forum (FKDF) was formed by former slave girls with the help of NYF and FNC. The suspicious death 12-year-old kamlari Srijana Chaudhary in March 2013 revived the movement and saw mass protests taking place to demand the practice's immediate end. After images of police hitting the protesting girls were seen in national and international media, outrage against the Nepalese government soared. In June 2013, the government finally gave in and officially abolished the kamlari system and agreed to a 10-point plan involving compensation, rehabilitation and justice for victims of abuse.

=== Post-abolition practice ===
Despite the 2013 official prohibition on putting girls into indentured servitude, the NYF estimated in October 2017 that hundreds of girls were still living in slave-like conditions, many in the homes of prominent politicians and businessmen.

== See also ==
- Haliya

== Literature ==
- Anita Cheria (2005) Liberation is not enough: the kamaiya movement in Nepal. ActionAid Nepal, Kathmandu 2005 ISBN 99946-800-2-1, ISBN 978-99946-800-2-3
- Giri, B.R. (2012) "The Bonded Labour System in Nepal: Musahar and Tharu Communities' Assessments of the Haliya and Kamaiya Labour Contracts," Journal of Alternative Perspectives in the Social Sciences, 4(2): 518–551.
- Giri, B.R. (2011) "The Bonded Labor System in Nepal: Exploring Haliya and Kamaiya Children's Lifeworlds," in: A. Guneratne (ed.) The Tarai: History, Society, Environment, pp. 101–110, Lalitpur, Nepal: Himal Books.
- Giri, B.R. (2010) The Haliya and Kamaiya Bonded Child Labourers in Nepal, in G. Craig (ed.), Child Slavery Now, pp. 227–241, Bristol (UK): Policy Press.
- Giri, B.R. (2010) "The Bonded Labour Practice in Nepal: "The Promise of Education" as a Magnet of Child Bondedness?" South Asia Research, 30(2): 145-64
- Giri, B.R. (2009) "The Bonded Labour System in Nepal: Perspectives of Haliya and Kamaiya Child Workers," Journal of Asian and African Studies, 44(6): 599–623.
- Giri, B.R. (2007) "Modern Slavery," in: R. Ennals (ed.) From Slavery to Citizenship, West Sussex, UK: John Wiley and Sons, pp. 257–261.
- Peter Lowe, Vinaya Kasajoo (2001) Kamaiya: Slavery and Freedom in Nepal. Mandala Book Point, in association with Danish Association for International Co-operation (MS Nepal), Kathmandu ISBN 99933-1-011-5, ISBN 978-99933-1-011-2 Mandala Book Point: About the book
