= List of former comfort women =

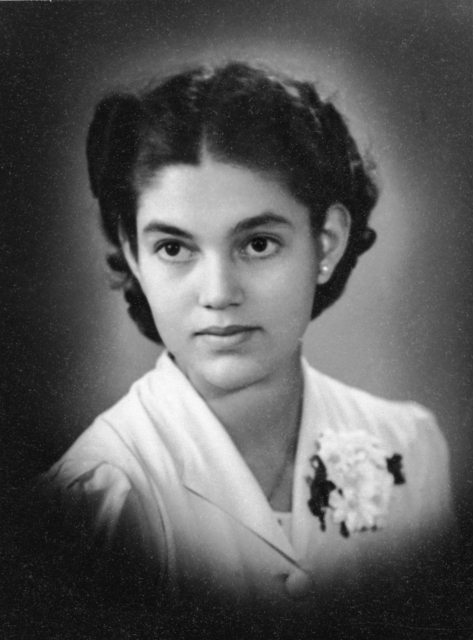
Portrait of Jan Ruff O'Herne taken at Bandoeng, Java, shortly before the Japanese invasion in March 1942

This is a list of known victims of the Japanese Imperial Army's "comfort women" system during World War II.

Several decades after the end of the war, a number of former comfort women demanded formal apologies and a compensation from the Government of Japan, with varying levels of success.

== Dutch East Indies ==
- Jan Ruff O'Herne (January 18, 1923 – August 19, 2019)
- Ellen van der Ploeg (1923–2013)

== Korea ==
Status of former comfort women
Surviving former comfort women	Deceased former comfort women	Registered former comfort women
4	235	240

=== People who died in the 1990s ===
The 1990s were both the period when former "comfort women" began to earnestly testify about their suffering, and when the number of deaths began to gradually increase due to the aging population.

- Bae Bong-gi (1915– October 18, 1991)
- Kim Bong-nyeon (1924 – October 15, 1995)
- Kang Duk-Kyung (February 1929 – February 2, 1996)
- Moon Ok-ju (1924 – October 26, 1996)
- Kim Hak-sun (1924–1997)
- Jeong Hak-su (1925 – March 17, 1998)

=== People who died in the 2000s ===
Entering the 2000s, the number of deaths increased. This is attributed to a steady increase in cases of deteriorating health and natural deaths due to old age, as the average age of the victims exceeded 80.

- Kim Soon-duk (1921 – June 30, 2004)
- Noh Cheong-ja (1921 – June 30, 2004)
- Jang Seo-yoon (1924 – August 26, 2004)
- Kim Sang-hee (1922 – January 2, 2005)
- Kim Bun-seon (1922 – January 10, 2005)
- Park Bok-soon (1921 – January 27, 2005)
- Kang Sun-ae (1928 – April 19, 2005)
- Kim Young-ja (1922 – April 20, 2005)
- Shin Gyeong-ran (1922 – April 25, 2005)
- Park Du-ri (1924 – February 19, 2006)
- Park Young-shim (December 15, 1921 – August 7, 2006)
- Kang Do-ah (1922 – October 23, 2007)
- Ji Dol-ee (1923 – February 6, 2008)
- Moon Pil-gi (1925 - March 5, 2008)
- Kim Eum-jeon (1924 – April 3, 2008)
- Han Do-soon (1921 – December 5, 2008)
- Kim Ui-gyeong (1918–December 2009)

=== People who died in the 2010s ===
- Kim Soon-ak (1928 – January 2, 2010)
- Lee Jeom-rye (1921 – February 11, 2010)
- Lee Du-sun (1922 – March 11, 2010)
- Kim Gye-hwa (1921 – May 16, 2010)
- Park Soon-im (1920 – June 28, 2010)
- Jin Hua-sun (1930 - September 11, 2010)
- Sim Dal-yeon (1927 – December 15, 2010)
- Jeong Yun-hong (1920 – December 31, 2010)
- Lee Ki-seon (1923 – January 3, 2011)
- Im Jeong-ja (1922 – January 13, 2011)
- Park Bun-i (1920 – January 13, 2011)
- Shin Ssang-sim (1927 – March 21, 2011)
- Park Ok-ryeon (1919 – May 15, 2011)
- Jeong Maria (1920 – May 17, 2011)
- Kim Oh-sun (1927 – September 18, 2011)
- Song Nam-i (1920 – September 25, 2011)
- Noh Su-bok (1921 – November 4, 2011)
- Park Seo-un (1917 – December 4, 2011)
- Kim Yo-ji (1924 – December 13, 2011)
- Yun Geum-rye (1922 – March 9, 2012)
- Kim Hwa-sun (1926 – June 13, 2012)
- Hwang Geum-ju (1921 – January 3, 2013)
- Lee Yong-nyeo (1926 – August 11, 2013)
- Choi Seon-sun (1927 – August 24, 2013)
- Hwang Geum-ja (1924–January 26, 2014)
- Bae Chun-hee (1923 – June 8, 2014)
- Hwang Seon-sun (1926 – January 26, 2015)
- Park Wi-nam (1922 – January 31, 2015)
- Lee Hyo-sun (1924 – May 27, 2015)
- Kim Oe-han (1934 – June 11, 2015)
- Kim Yeon-hee (1932 – June 24, 2015)
- Choi Geum-seon (1925 – July 5, 2015)
- Park Yu-nyeon (1922 – August 7, 2015)
- Choi Gap-sun (1919 – December 5, 2015)
- Kim Kyung-soon (1926–2016)
- Gong Jeom-yeop (1920 – May 17, 2016)
- Lee Su-dan (1921 – May 17, 2016)
- Yoo Hee-nam (1927–)
- Park Sook-yi (1922 – December 6, 2016)
- Park Cha-soon (1923 – January 18, 2017)
- Lee Soon-deok (1917 – April 4, 2017)
- Kim Kun-ja (1926 – July 23, 2017)
- Hwang Yu-ryang (1927 – August 12, 2017)
- Ha Sang-suk (1928 – August 28, 2017)
- Lee Ki-jeong (1924 – November 11, 2017)
- Song Sin-do (1922–2017))
- Ahn Jeom-sun (January 2, 1928 – March 30, 2018)
- Choi Deok-rye (1921 – April 23, 2018)
- Kim Bok-deuk (1917 – July 1, 2018)
- Ha Jeom-yeon (1921–October 26, 2018)
- Kim Soon-ok (1922 – December 5, 2018)
- Lee Gwi-nyeo (1926 – December 14, 2018)
- Kim Bok-dong (May 1, 1926 -– January 19, 2019)
- Kwak Ye-nam (1925 – March 2, 2019)

=== People who died in the 2020s ===
- Lee Mak-dal (1923 – August 29, 2020)
- Jeong Bok-su (1922 – February 12, 2021)
- Kim Yang-ju (1924 – May 1, 2022)
- Lee Ok-seon (1928 – December 26, 2022 + from Daegu)
- Park Ok-seon (1924 – September 6, 2024)
- Gil Won-ok (November 30, 1928 – February 16, 2025)
- Lee Ok-seon (1928 – May 11, 2025 + from Busan)
- Kang Il-chul (1928 – March 29, 2026)

=== Currently living ===
- Lee Yong-soo (born December 13, 1928)
- Im Jeong-sun

== Taiwan ==
- Liu Huang A-tao (1923–2011)

== The Philippines ==
- Rosa Henson (December 5, 1927 – August 18, 1997)
- Walterina Markova (1924–2005)

== People's Republic of China ==
- Lei Guiying (1928 - April 25, 2007)
- Zhou Fenying (1917-)
- Inwilin (尹玉林)
- Zhu Qumei (unknown - 2005)
- 虞冬娥
- Wan Aihua (萬愛花): The First Testimony of a Chinese Japanese Military 'Comfort Woman' (c. 1921/22 - September 4, 2013)
- Lee Moon-woo
- Guo Xicui (unknown - July 23, 2013)
- Hou Chaolian (unknown - 1999)
- Liu Nianzhen (1918–2024)
- Xiao Rui (小瑞, 1930–2025)

== See also ==
- Comfort Women
- Asian Women's Fund
- Diary of a Japanese Military Brothel Manager
- List of human rights activists
- List of slaves
- War rape
- Statue of Peace
