= Chung Seo-woon =

Korean activist

Chung Seo-woon (1924–2004) was a Korean "comfort woman" in the Japanese colonial era during World War II. The Japanese army invaded her home without warning and suddenly took her to Busan forcefully. For the next seven years, the Japanese Army transported her to Japan, Taiwan, Singapore, and Indonesia. Chung Seo-woon later became a human rights activist, giving testimony in Japan and the United States and calling for an apology and compensation from Japan.

== Biography ==
Chung Seo-woon was born in Hadong, South Gyeongsang Province. She was the only child of a wealthy family. When she was fourteen years old, her father was arrested. Chung Seo-woon was fooled by the village foreman's advice that her father would be released if she went to work in a Japanese textile factory. The Japanese Army kidnapped her and took her to Busan and then to a warehouse with about one thousand other kidnapped girls in Shimonoseki, Japan. She was later transported to Taiwan, Singapore, and Indonesia. She was allegedly raped by dozens of soldiers every day. Ultimately she spent seven years as a "comfort woman".

Even though she regained her freedom at the end of World War II, Chung Seo-woon had to spend a year in the prison camp in Singapore before returning to her homeland in 1945. She returned to her old home in 1946, but found that it had been abandoned. As a result, she was forced to live in poverty on the street while selling bread and medicine. When she was almost sixty years old, she met her husband. Chung said, "I was never able to have a normal sex life, but I met a kind man who wanted a companion more than anything else." Her husband had been forcibly conscripted by Japan, so he understood and protected her deep wounds. Chung stated, “I do not want to dream nightmare about the harsh experience as a comfort woman anymore.” Chung Seo-woon died at her home in Jinhae, South Gyeongsang Province, in February 2004.

== Activism ==
Soon after Kim Hak-sun gave the first testimony as a former South Korean comfort woman in 1992. Chung Seo-woon publicly disclosed the fact that she was also a victim of the Japanese military comfort system. In September 1995, at age seventy-five, she spoke at the International Symposium on Violence Against Women War and Armed Conflicts in China, saying "The Japanese defiled [my] body but not [my] spirit. Why should I hide? I am not the one who should feel shame; it is Japan who should carry all the shame on its shoulders. Helps me tell this story to American and the whole world.”

Thereafter, she participated in the production of documentaries to testify about the reality of brutality of the Japanese military. She also attended the Wednesday demonstration with Kang Duk-kyung, Kim Bok-dong and Kim Soon-duk. She took the lead in exposing the cruelty of the Japanese military and calling for a proper apology and compensation. As a result, the use of comfort women issue was classified as a war crime by the United Nations. A monument called the "Peace Tower in Memory of Sex Slaves of the Japanese Colonial Army" has been built at the Seomjin River, near Chung's birthplace.
