= Comfort women in the arts =

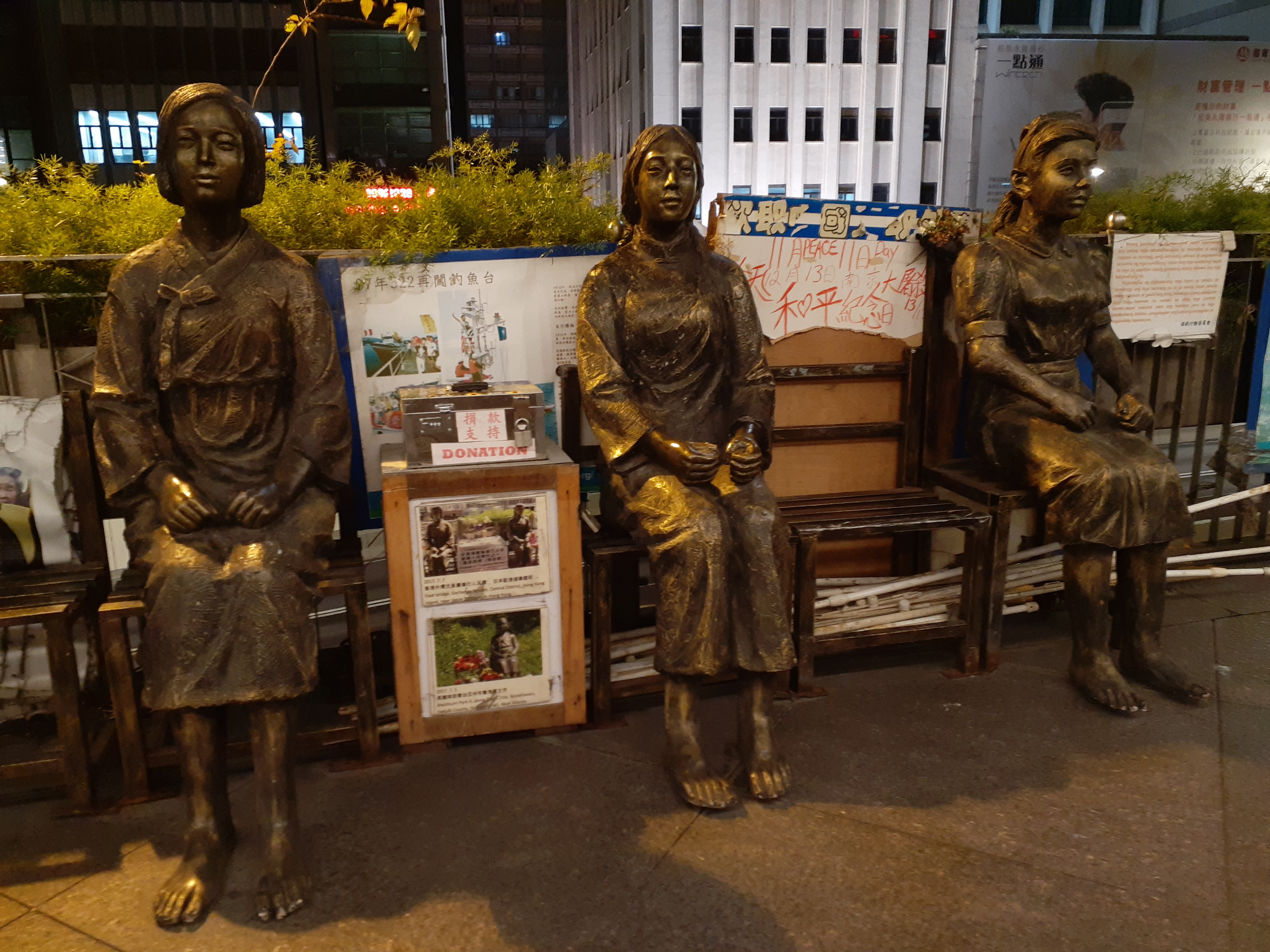
Statue of comfort women in Central, Hong Kong

Comfort women – girls and women forced into sexual slavery for the Imperial Japanese Army – experienced trauma during and following their enslavement. Comfort stations were initially established in 1932 within Shanghai, however silence from the governments of South Korea and Japan suppressed comfort women's voices post-liberation. Catalysed by the feminist-led Redress movement of the 1990s, the cause of comfort women has since been better publicized – in part due to the role of the visual arts in promoting healing and the creation of activist communities.

== Emerging role of the arts ==
Until Kim Hak-sun's testimony in 1991, comfort women were silenced post-liberation – in South Korea due the nation's masculinist culture and nationalist shame. Following this, the issue gained momentum, with demands for recognition and compensation emanating from multiple sources, including feminist organisations and legal professionals.

However, stemming from both comfort women themselves and artists seeking to disseminate their stories, art was similarly utilised to produce a collective memory of colonisation. Art focused on inciting change at the individual level by influencing public perceptions, ensuring sustained engagement in the absence of sufficient scholarly and governmental support, and contributing to the Redress movement.

== Notable artwork ==
- Paintings by Kang Duk-kyung
  - Punish the Guilty
  - Stolen Innocence
- Painting by Kim Soon-duk
  - Unblossomed Flower
- Films
  - Snowy Road
  - Spirits' Homecoming
  - I Can Speak
  - Herstory (film)
- Play by Chungmi Kim
  - Comfort Woman also known as Hanako or Nabi
- Play by Yoshiji Watanabe
  - The Eye Holds the Truth
- Musical by Dimo Hyun Jun Kim
  - Comfort Women: A New Musical
- Statue of Peace

== Contribution ==
Alongside the overarching goal of publicizing the comfort women issue, the impact of artworks has been categorized in three ways: propaganda art, which disperses a truth; dialogic art, which creates a space to gain more authentic perspectives; and social art, which engages the public.

=== Propaganda art ===
Acting as evidence of the impact of Japanese colonialism, propaganda art has focused on giving materiality to survivors' experiences. The paintings Unblossomed Flower and Stolen Innocence sought to disseminate true experiences – both depicting comfort women, with flowers used to symbolise their destroyed virginity. As Unblossomed Flower is routinely displayed and gifted internationally, the piece has taken on a political role – becoming emblematic of the struggles of colonial Korea. Furthermore, through the painting Punish the Guilty, comfort women have centered themselves as anti-colonial figures. Used at the Women's International War Crimes Tribunal on Japan's Military Sexual Slavery, the piece depicts the punishment of an Imperial Japanese soldier. Elevating the voices of comfort women, this worked to publicly oppose Japanese nationalist accounts, which continue to counter that comfort women were sex slaves. As such, these works functioned as contributions to both postcolonial and feminist empowerment.

=== Dialogic art ===
Blurring traditional binaries, dialogic art has sought to expand discussion on comfort women. Films such as Snowy Road and Spirits' Homecoming – both centered around the lives of two Korean girls forced to become comfort women – are examples of works that invite audiences to be in conversation with survivors. They do so by emphasising the consumption of art as a mode of social participation, encouraging citizens to support the ongoing drive to represent the varied experiences of comfort women. Spirits' Homecoming makes an effort to avoid portraying comfort women as helpless victims, despite emphasizing their coercive recruitment. Similarly, Snowy Road emphasizes harmony between Japanese and Korean comfort women and highlights their joint silencing post-liberation. Through this, understandings of Japanese colonialism have been problematized, revealing the shared nature of Japanese and Korean comfort women's experiences and implicating both nations' governments in the perpetuation of trauma – mirroring the transnational advocacy undertaken by Korean and Japanese feminist groups, and impacting the way that individuals understand the issue.

=== Social art ===
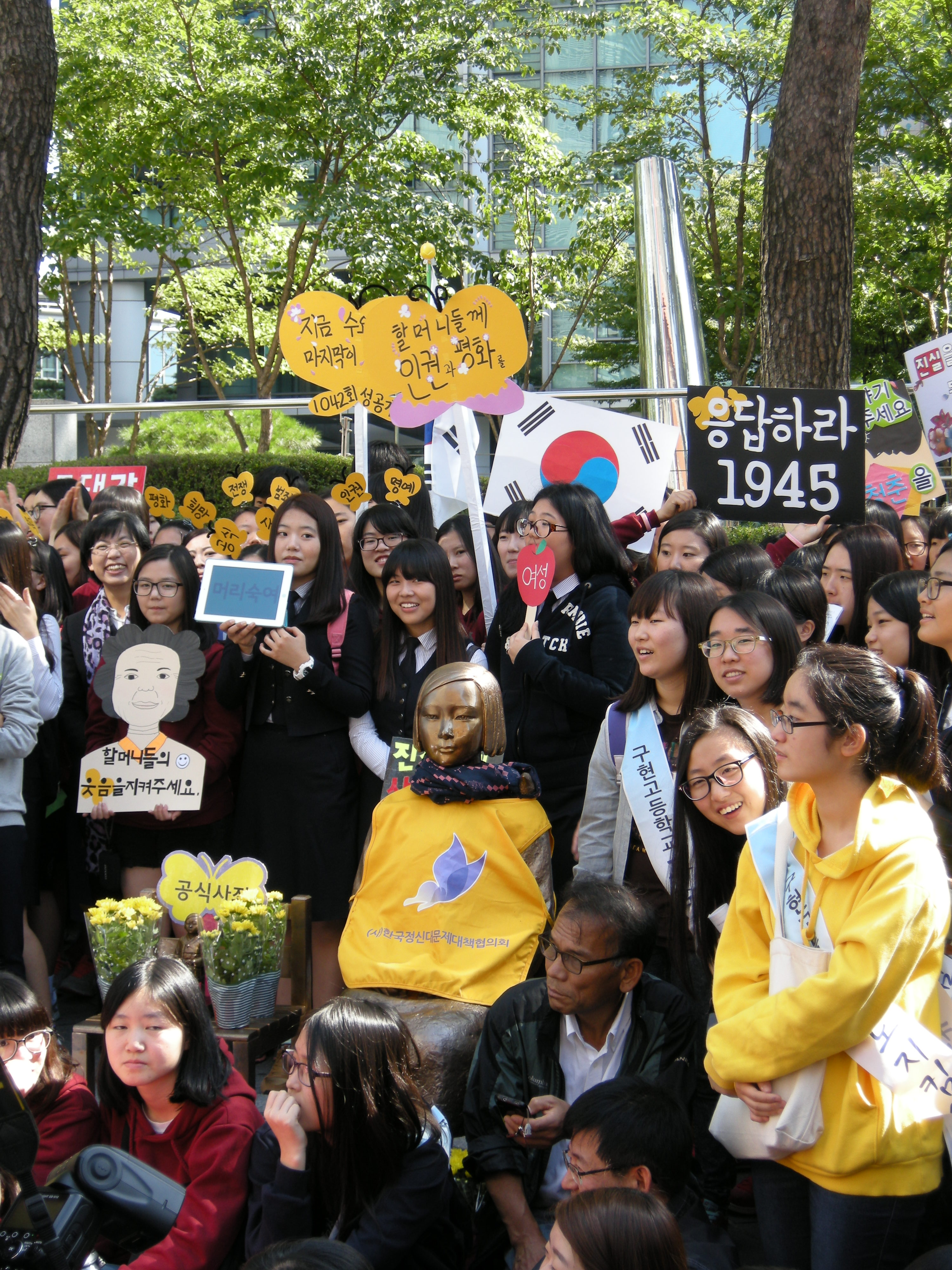
Statue of Peace during 2012 National Foundation Day protests

With the aim of forging communities, social art has worked to integrate advocacy into the everyday lives of citizens. Notably observed through the Statue of Peace – a memorial in Seoul, symbolizing victims of the Comfort System – art has been used to bring attention to the comfort women issue and cement victimhood as an aspect of postcolonial Korean identity. Citizens regularly interact with the statue during the Redress movement's Wednesday demonstrations, dressing it and leaving flowers. As a result, memorials have acted as a collective point for citizens to mobilize around, further solidifying activism. The power of such interactions has inspired the erection of additional memorial statues globally, resulting in increased engagement with the comfort women issue – promoting the transnational nature of colonial victimhood. This has raised demands for reparations internationally, counteracting attempts to whitewash the issue – which has been especially important amid Japanese calls for the statues' removal.

== Impact ==
While yet to succeed in securing meaningful reparations, the use of the visual arts alongside traditional means of social activism has prevented the erasure of comfort women from public consciousness. With a focus on the individual level, artworks have centered the voices of comfort women, encouraging ongoing dialogue within which the public, both domestically and internationally, can participate.
