= Japan–Korea disputes =

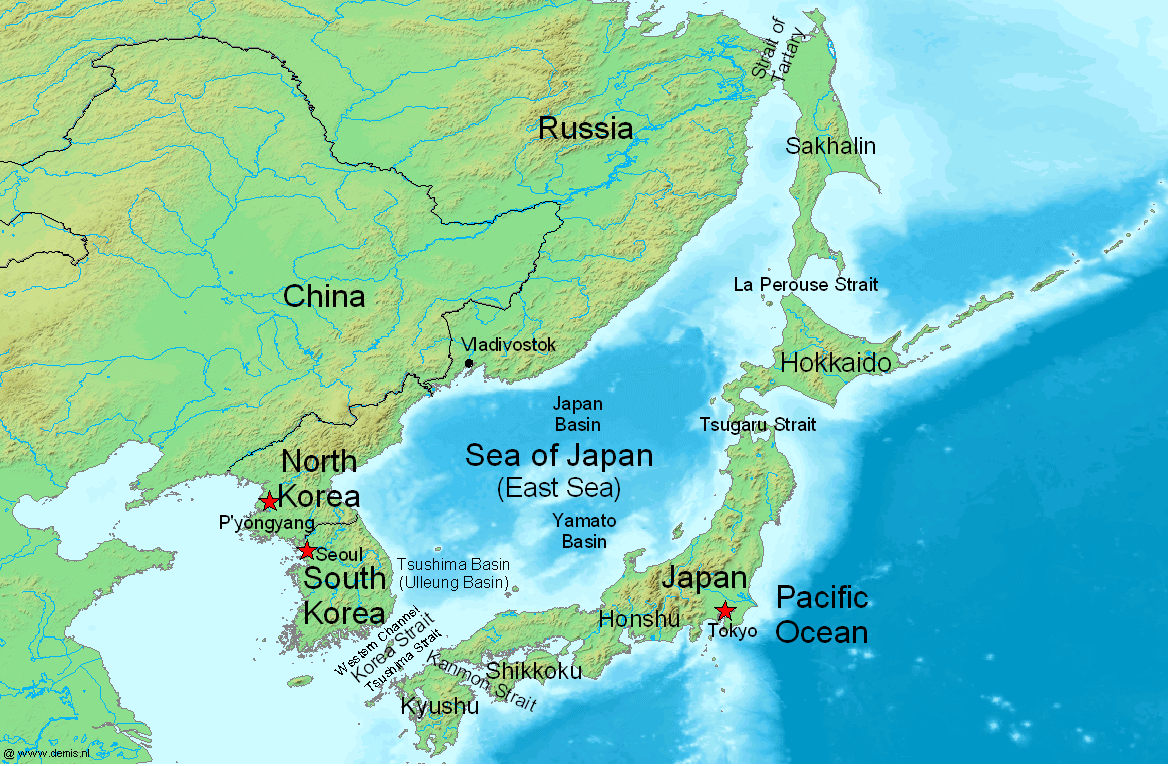
Korea peninsula and the Japanese Archipelago are separated by the Sea of Japan.

There have been a number of significant disputes between various Koreanic and Japonic states. The two regions have a long history of relations as immediate neighbors that has been marked with conflict. One of the most significant issues is the Japanese colonization of Korea that began with the Japan–Korea Treaty of 1910 and ended with the surrender of Japan at the end of World War II.

Although South Korea was established in 1948, Japan–South Korea relations only officially began in 1965 with the signing of the Basic Treaty that normalized their relations. Today, Japan and South Korea are major trading partners, and many students, tourists, entertainers, and business people travel between the two countries. Despite strong economic cooperation between the two countries, ongoing territorial and historical issues exist between the two nations.

Relations between Japan and North Korea are not yet normalized, and there are ongoing historical, geopolitical and nuclear issues between the two nations.

== Background ==
With the Japan–Korea Treaty of 1876, Japan decided to expand their initial settlements and acquired an enclave in Busan. In the Sino-Japanese War of 1894–95, Japan defeated the Qing dynasty, and had released Korea from the tributary system of Qing China by concluding the Treaty of Shimonoseki, which compelled the Qing to acknowledge Yi Dynasty Korea as an independent country. Japan encouraged the modernization of Korea. However, the ruling Min clan, including the Queen Min took precautions against Japan due to its increasing dominance and influence within the Korean peninsula. In 1895, Queen Min was assassinated by Japan after seeking to promote Russian influence and oppose reform.

=== Japan–Korea Annexation Treaty ===
In 1897, Joseon was renamed to the Korean Empire (1897–1910), affirming its independence, but greatly gravitated closer to Russia, with the King ruling from the Russian legation, and then using Russian guards upon return to his palace. Japan declared war on Russia to drive out Russian influence, and ended the war by imposing the Japan–Korea Treaty of 1905. Korea became a protectorate of Japan, a precursor to its annexation. Itō Hirobumi, who was the first prime minister of Japan and one of the elder statesmen, was Resident-General of Korea and was opposed to the annexation of Korea. However, the power balance in domestic Japan grew in favor of the annexation, in part because of Itō's assassination in 1909 by An Jung-Geun. On August 22, 1910, Japan had formally annexed Korea through the Japan–Korea Annexation Treaty.

In 1910, Japan annexed Korea. The legality of the annexation and the subsequent 35-years of occupation of the Korean Peninsula by Japan are controversial. Both have been criticized as illegal based on the fact that the Japan–Korea Treaty of 1905 was signed under duress, as well as its never having been ratified by Gojong of Korea. Some Japanese scholars have challenged this view of the treaty as invalid.

=== Post-war Korea ===
Kim Il Sung had led a Korean independence movement, which was active in the border areas between China and Russia, particularly in areas with considerable ethnic Korean populations. Kim founded North Korea, and his descendants have still not signed a peace treaty with Japan. The Provisional Government of the Republic of Korea, led by (later) South Korea's first president Syngman Rhee, had moved from Shanghai to Chongqing. Lee lobbied the United States and was recognized by the South Korean administrator by Douglas MacArthur. Japanese control of Korea ended on September 9, 1945, when the Governor-General of Korea signed the instrument of surrender document to United States in Seoul.

=== Normalization of bilateral relations and compensation ===
Twenty years after World War II, South Korea and Japan re-established diplomatic relations with the 1965 signing of the Treaty on Basic Relations. In 2005, South Korea disclosed diplomatic documents that detailed the proceedings of the treaty. Kept secret in South Korea for 40 years, the documents revealed that Japan provided 500 million dollars in soft loans and 300 million in grants to South Korea as compensation for the reign of Japan. South Korea agreed to demand no more compensation after the treaty, either at a government-to-government level or an individual-to-government level. It was also revealed that the South Korean government assumed the responsibility for compensating individuals on a lump sum basis while rejecting Japan's proposal for direct compensation.

== Historical issues following normalization ==
=== Individual compensation ===
With the Basic Treaty signed between countries, Japan had compensated the Korean government for both its peacetime occupation and wartime activities. The South Korean government used most of the loans for economic development and paid 300,000 won per death, with only a total of 2,570 million won to the relatives of 8,552 victims who died in forced labor. Korean victims had filed a compensation lawsuit against the South Korean government as of 2005. Subsequent lawsuits in South Korea have had contradictory results as to whether Japan and Japanese companies are still liable for individual compensation from their action during the occupation. Japan claims that all of its and Japanese companies responsibilities have been met by the 1965 Treaty on Basic Relations. Women's International War Crimes Tribunal on Japan's Military Sexual Slavery, a mock trial organised by and supported by Japanese NGO Women's International War Crimes Tribunal on Japan's Military Sexual Slavery, issued a ruling that "states cannot agree by treaty to waive the liability of another state for crimes against humanity".

Diplomatic relations over compensation flared up again following a 2018 ruling by the Supreme Court of Korea which ordered Mitsubishi Heavy Industries to pay compensation to the families of 28 Koreans who were forced laborers. Japan had viewed the Treaty as having been the final instrument of compensation, while the South Korean government backed the ruling of its highest court. The government of Moon Jae-in viewed the Treaty as not having abrogated the rights of individuals to seek compensation.

In July 2019, Prime Minister of Japan Shinzō Abe accused the government of South Korea of not having an "appropriate response to its breach" of the treaty. In response, Blue House spokeswoman Ko Min-jung advised that the two countries' governments "not [to] cross the line and make [the] utmost efforts for future cooperation between the two countries and their people." Moon Jae-In had further called for "technological innovation" so that South Korea relied less on Japan, in the context of ongoing trade wars and South Korean reliance on Japanese technological imports. This issue had significantly impacted South Korea–Japan military cooperation and economic trade.

=== Formal apologies for colonization ===
==== South Korea ====
Although diplomatic relations were established by treaty in 1965, South Korea continues to request an apology and compensation for Korea under Japanese rule. The Japanese government has apologized officially many times. In 2012, The South Korean government asked that Emperor Akihito should apologize for Japan's colonial rule of the Korean Peninsula. Some Japanese Prime Ministers have issued apologies, including Prime Minister Obuchi in the Japan–South Korea Joint Declaration of 1998, but many have not. Survey evidence suggests that Japanese citizens with conservative ideologies and hierarchical group dispositions tend to resist issuing apologies. Even in education, there is only a footnote about comfort women in Japanese textbooks. In one example in 2005, the Koizumi Cabinet did not participate, but 47 Diet members visited Yasukuni shrine for a memorial service at exactly the same time Prime Minister Koizumi was issuing the apology. This was portrayed by South Korean Media as a contradiction and has caused many South Koreans to distrust and discard Japanese statements of apology.

==== North Korea ====
Prime Minister Junichirō Koizumi, in the Japan-DPRK Pyongyang Declaration of 2002, said: "I once again express my feelings of deep remorse and heartfelt apology, and also express the feelings of mourning for all victims, both at home and abroad, in the war."

=== Return of Korean remains ===
In the 1970s, requests were made for Japan to return the remains of around 38,000 Korean people (specifically their noses) from the nose tomb Mimizuka in Kyoto. These noses were cut off the faces of people during the Japanese invasions of Korea from 1592 to 1598. The noses have still not been returned to Korea, although some Koreans wish to keep them there as a monument to Japan's brutal treatment of Koreans during the invasion.

During the Japanese occupation of Korea (particularly during World War II), Japan mobilized 700,000 laborers from Korea to sustain industrial production, mainly in mining. Some of them eventually returned to Korea after the war, with some dying in Japan during the atomic bombing of Hiroshima, or the other Allied bombings of Japan. The high death toll may also have had other causes in the harsh conditions of the war. Corporations, such as Mitsubishi, Mitsui and others, stated that the culpability should fall on the government and not on private companies. The government distributed funds to companies for the purposes of worker repatriation. Japanese companies paid out sums at the end of the war to Chinese work leaders intended for Chinese labourers to return home to China, but the money went missing after distribution to the Chinese workers. Later, the People's Republic of China and South Korea requested help in finding the dead bodies of kidnapped Chinese and Korean laborers for proper burial. The situation prevented China and South Korea from appropriately coordinating their efforts, and they have only identified a few hundred bodies. In addition, Korean workers began demanding their unpaid wages immediately after Japan's surrender and continue to do so today. The issue remains salient in South Korea.

=== Return of Korean cultural artifacts ===
The Japanese rule of Korea also resulted in the relocation of tens of thousands of cultural artifacts to Japan. The issue over where these articles should be located began during the U.S. occupation of Japan. In 1965, as part of the Treaty on Basic Relations between Japan and the Republic of Korea, Japan returned roughly 1,400 artifacts to Korea, and considered the diplomatic matter to have been resolved. Korean artifacts are retained in the Tokyo National Museum and in the hands of many private collectors.

In 1994, hundreds of books of the Heart Sutra which were donated by the Goryeo Dynasty to Japan in 1486 were stolen from a temple. The following year, three damaged books out of these hundreds were discovered in South Korea and registered as National Treasure no. 284. In 2002, thieves stole another medieval gift and a Japanese biography of Prince Shōtoku, and donated them to a temple in Korea.

According to the South Korean government, there are 75,311 cultural artifacts that were taken from Korea. Japan has 34,369, the United States has 17,803, and France has several hundred, which were seized in the French expedition to Korea and loaned back to Korea in 2010 without an apology. In 2010, Prime Minister of Japan Naoto Kan expressed "deep remorse" for the removal of artifacts, and arranged an initial plan to return the Royal Protocols of the Joseon Dynasty and over 1,200 other books, which was carried out in 2011.

=== Comfort women ===
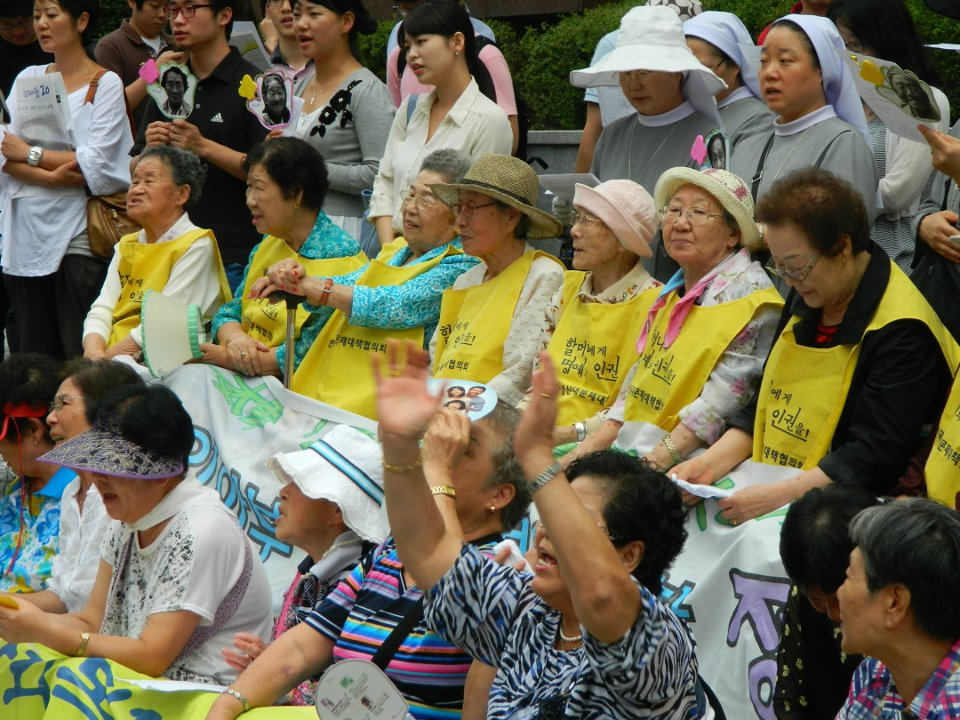
Surviving comfort women (in middle row) at a 'Wednesday demonstration' in front of Japanese Embassy in Seoul

Many South Koreans have demanded compensation for "comfort women", the women who were forced to work in Imperial Japanese military brothels during World War II. Enlisted to the military "comfort stations" through force, including kidnapping, coercion, and deception, the Korean comfort women, most of them under the age of 18, were forced to serve. As the few surviving comfort women continued to demand acknowledgement and a sincere apology, the Japanese court rejected their compensation claims.

In November 1990, the Korean Council for Women Drafted for Military Sexual Slavery by Japan was established in South Korea. As of 2008, a lump sum payment of 43 million South Korean won and a monthly payment of ₩0.8 million won were given to the survivors by the Korean government. In 1993, the government of Japan officially acknowledged the presence of wartime brothels, and set up a private Asian Women's Fund to distribute donated money and issue official letters of apology to the victims. Today, many of the surviving comfort women are in their 80s. As of 2007, according to South Korean government, there are 109 survivors in South Korea and 218 in North Korea. The survivors in South Korea protest every Wednesday in front of the Japanese embassy in Seoul, Korea. The protest was held for the 1000th time in December 2011.

In July 2007, the U.S. House of Representatives passed a non-binding resolution calling for Japan to apologize for forcing women into sex slavery during World War II. The resolution was sponsored by Mike Honda (D-CA), a third-generation Japanese-American. On December 13, 2007, the European Parliament adopted a resolution demanding that the Japanese government apologize to the survivors of Japan's military sexual slavery system. This resolution was passed with 54 ayes out of 57 parliament members present.

On December 28, 2015, Japanese Prime Minister Shinzō Abe and South Korean President Park Geun-hye reached a formal agreement to settle the dispute. Japan agreed to pay ¥1 billion (₩9.7 billion; $8.3 million) to a fund supporting surviving victims while South Korea agreed to refrain from criticizing Japan regarding the issue and to work to remove a statue memorializing the victims from in front of the Japanese embassy in Seoul. The announcement came after Japanese foreign minister Fumio Kishida met his counterpart Yun Byung-se in Seoul, and later Abe phoned Geun-hye to repeat the apologies already offered by Japan. The South Korean government will administer the fund for elderly comfort women. The agreement was firstly welcomed by the majority of the former comfort women (36 out of 47 existed former comfort women at that time) and the payment was received by them. However, Moon Jae-in utilized the criticism against the agreement for his presidential election supported by an activist group, the Korean Council for the Women Drafted for Military Sexual Slavery by Japan, which criticized the agreement and persuaded the women to deny the payment. After Moon Jae-in become the president, South Korea government decided again keep the issue of "Comfort Woman" as a dispute between the two countries by discarding the 2015 agreement and shut down the Japan-funded comfort women foundation which was launched in July 2016 to finance the agreement's settlement on November 21, 2018.

In 2020, a former comfort woman Lee Yong-soo accused the Korean Council for the Women Drafted for Military Sexual Slavery by Japan and Yoon Mee-hyang, the former head of the council, of misusing funds and embezzlement. Some newspapers criticize the council and Yoon Mee-hyang because they seemed to amplify the problem by just criticizing Japan and exploited the former comfort women, although they said they are working for resolve the dispute and working for the former comfort women.

=== Japanese prime ministers' visits to Yasukuni Shrine ===
Yasukuni Shrine is a Shinto shrine that memorializes Japanese armed forces members killed in wartime. It was constructed as a memorial during the Meiji period to house the remains of those who died for Japan. The shrine houses the remains of Hideki Tojo (東条英機), the Prime Minister and Army Minister of Japan between 1941 and 1944, and 13 other Class A war criminals, from 1978 onwards. Yasukuni Shrine has been a subject of controversy, containing a memorial for 1,043 Japanese and 23 Korean B and C war criminals who were executed, as well as the 14 Japanese A-class war criminals. The presence of these war criminals among the dead honoured at Yasukuni Shrine has meant that visits to Yasukuni have been seen by Chinese and South Koreans as apologism for the wartime era.

Yasuhiro Nakasone and Ryutaro Hashimoto visited Yasukuni Shrine in, respectively, 1986 and 1996, and paid respects as Prime Minister of Japan, drawing intense opposition from Korea and China. Junichirō Koizumi visited the shrine and paid respects six times during his term as Prime Minister of Japan, with the first visit on August 13, 2001, stating that he was "paying homage to the servicemen who died [in the] defense of Japan". These visits again drew strong condemnation and protests from Japan's neighbors, mainly China and South Korea. As a result, the heads of the two countries refused to meet with Koizumi, and there were no mutual visits between Chinese and Japanese leaders after October 2001 and between South Korean and Japanese leaders after June 2005. The President of South Korea, Roh Moo-hyun, had suspended all summit talks between South Korea and Japan until 2008 when he resigned from office. The former prime minister, Shinzō Abe, made several visits to the shrine, the most recent being in December 2013.

=== Nationalist historiography ===
Most anthropologists and historians acknowledge that Japan has historically been actively engaged with its neighbors China and Korea, as well as Southeast Asia. Among these neighbors, Chinese culture came to Japan from the Three Kingdoms of Korea. Japanese and Korean peoples share closely linked ethnic, cultural and anthropological histories; a point of controversy between nationalist scholars in Japan and Korea rests on which culture came first, and can thus be considered the forebear of the other.

Modern historiography is also a seat of discord. In South Korea, popular debates about "cleansing history" (Korean: 내역(과거)청산; RR: gwageo cheongsan; MR: kwagŏ ch'ŏngsan) focus on finding and recriminating "collaborators" with Japanese colonial authorities. In North Korea, the songbun system of ascribed status is used to punish citizens with collaborating relatives or ancestors. In 2013, South Korean scholar Park Yu-ha published Comfort Women of the Japanese Empire, a study that reexamined the Japanese military's comfort women system within the broader context of Japanese colonial rule. Park explored the differing experiences of Korean women, the roles of intermediaries, and the influence of colonial structures and national identity on historical memory. The work also addressed the relationship between competing historical interpretations and reconciliation between Japan and South Korea. In 2019, South Korean economist Lee Young-hoon and five co-authors published Anti-Japan Tribalism: The root of the Korean Crisis, a book that challenged South Korean interpretations of Japanese colonial rule, including colonial-era economic development, forced labour, and the comfort women system.

On the other hand, Japan's Ministry of Education, Culture, Sports, Science and Technology (MEXT) reviews and approves the content of school history textbooks available for selection by Japanese schools. Foreign scholars, as well as many Japanese historians, have criticized the political slant and factual errors in some approved textbooks. After a textbook by the Japanese Society for History Textbook Reform (JSHTR) passed inspection in April 2001, the South Korean government, 59 NGOs from South Korea and Japan, and some Japanese teachers' unions, registered objections to certain passages' omission of Imperial Japanese war crimes including comfort women and the Rape of Nanking. Although Tsukurukai's textbook has sold six hundred thousand copies in the general market, it has been adopted by less than 0.39% of Japanese schools. In 2010, another textbook by the JSHTR passed inspection and was published by Jiyusha (自由社).

=== Issue of pro-Japanese collaborators ===
In Korea, people whose ancestors worked or are regarded to have worked for Japanese colonial ruling are criticized. A civic organization publish the list of pro-Japanese collaborators (see Chinilpa). The list is used to tell who was Japanese friendly and Korean people try to dig up and destroy the tomb of the listed people. Korean government accelerate this movement by enacting the Special law to redeem pro-Japanese collaborators' property in 2005 and nationalize land and other properties owned by descendants of pro-Japanese collaborators.

=== Dispute over different view of history ===
Because of many issues and received education, Japanese and Korean people's views of history are different. The parts of both views sometimes do not depend on the historical facts but based on the image of movies or novels.

== Geographic disputes ==
=== Liancourt Rocks ===
The Liancourt Rocks, called Dokdo (독도, 獨島; "solitary island") in Korean and Takeshima (竹島; "bamboo island") in Japanese, are a group of islets in the Sea of Japan whose ownership is disputed between South Korea and Japan. There are valuable fishing grounds around the islets and potentially large reserves of methane clathrate.

The territorial dispute is a major source of nationalistic tensions. Since the South Korean government bases its legitimacy partly on the notion that it defends South Korea from North Korea in the North and from Japan from the south, nationalism has been stoked over this issue. Korean tourists visit the remote, inhospitable island, in order to show national solidarity. In Japan, maps mark the islands as being Japanese territory.

On August 10, 1951, a secret correspondence currently known as the Rusk documents was sent to South Korea communicating the then U.S. position on issues of territorial sovereignty in the Peace Treaty explaining why the U.S. believed Liancourt Rocks were Japanese territory: "This normally uninhabited rock formation was according to our information never treated as part of Korea and, since about 1905, has been under the jurisdiction of the Oki Islands Branch Office of Shimane Prefecture of Japan. The island does not appear ever before to have been claimed by Korea." In September 1954 and March 1962, Japan proposed to South Korea that the dispute be referred to the International Court of Justice, but South Korea rejected the proposals. In 2005, members of the Japanese prefecture of Shimane (the prefecture to which the islands belong according to the Japanese claim) declared "Takeshima Day", to highlight their territorial claim to the islands. Japan again proposed bringing the dispute to the International Court of Justice in August 2012, which was also officially rejected by South Korea on August 30, 2012.

Although the Liancourt Rocks are claimed by both Japan and (both) Koreas, the rocks are controlled by South Korea, which has the South Korean coast guard stationed there, as well as two elderly Korean residents.

=== Tsushima ===
A small minority of Koreans claim this island as belonging to Korea, although the South Korean government does not make this claim. Called "Tsushima" in Japanese and "Daemado" in Korean, this island was recorded on the Chinese history book as a territory of Japan from ancient times. This island, as Tsushima Province, has been ruled by Japanese governments since the Nara period. According to Homer Hulbert, this island was a dependency to Silla, one of the Three Kingdoms of Korea. However, according to the Korean history book Samguk Sagi written in 1145, Tsushima is ruled by the Japanese from CE 400. In the 15th century, King Sejong of Joseon sent troops to the island and occupied it after demanding it pay taxes to the Korean government.

In 1948, the South Korean government formally demanded that the island be ceded to South Korea based on "historical claims". However, the claim was rejected by SCAP in 1949. On July 19, 1951, the South Korean government agreed that the earlier demand for Tsushima had been dropped by the South Korean government with regards to the Japanese peace treaty negotiations.

In 2010, a group of 37 members of the South Korean congress formed a forum to study Korea's territorial claims to Tsushima and make outreach efforts to the public. They said that Tsushima was a part of Korean history and that the people on the island are closely related to Koreans. Yasunari Takarabe, incumbent Mayor of Tsushima rejects the South Korean territorial claim: "Tsushima has always been Japan. I want them to retract their wrong historical perception. It was mentioned in the Gishiwajinden (魏志倭人伝) (a chapter of volume 30 of Book of Wei in the Chinese Records of the Three Kingdoms) as part of Wa (Japan). It has never been and cannot be a South Korean territory."

=== The Sea of Japan naming dispute ===
There is dispute over the international name for this body of water. Japan points out that the name "Sea of Japan" (Japanese: 日本海) was used in a number of European maps from the late 18th century to the early 19th century, and that many maps today retain this naming. However, both the North and South Korean governments have protested that Japan encouraged the usage of the name "Sea of Japan" while Korea lost effective control over its foreign policy under Japanese imperial expansion. South Korea argues that the name "East Sea" or "Korean Eastern Sea" (Korean: 동해; Hanja: 東海), which was one of the most common names found on old European maps of this sea, should be the name instead of (or at least used concurrently with) "Sea of Japan."

Japan claims that Western countries named it the "Sea of Japan" prior to 1860, before the growth of Japanese influence over Korean foreign policy after the outbreak of the First Sino-Japanese War in 1894. Further, Japan claims that the primary naming occurred during the period of Sakoku, when Japan had very little foreign contact, and thus Japan could not have influenced the naming decisions. It was in 1929, when the International Hydrographic Organization's Limits of Oceans and Seas used the name "Sea of Japan", which eventually influenced other official international documents such as the United Nations. South Korea claims that Korea was occupied by the Japanese and effectively had no international voice to protest in 1929.

== Miscellaneous issues ==
=== Statements by Japanese politicians on colonial rule ===
Since the 1950s, many prominent politicians and officials in Japan have made statements on Japanese colonial rule in Korea which created outrage and led to diplomatic scandals in Korean–Japanese relations. The statements have led to anti-Japanese sentiments among Koreans, and a widespread perception that Japanese apologies for colonial rule have been insincere and discarded due to these statements.

During the talks between Japan and Korea in 1953, Kan'ichirō Kubota, one of the Japanese representatives, stated: "Japanese colonial rule was beneficial to Korea ... Korea would have been colonized by other countries anyway, which would have led to harsher rules than Japanese rules." Many Koreans consider this remark to be the first reckless statement made by Japanese politicians about colonial rule in Korea.

In 1997, Shinzō Abe, then a member of the House of Representatives and former Prime Minister of Japan, stated: "Many so-called victims of comfort women system are liars ... prostitution was ordinary behavior in Korea because the country had many brothels."

On May 31, 2003, Tarō Asō, then the Minister of Internal Affairs and Communications and later Prime Minister, stated that "the change to Japanese name (創氏改名) during Japanese colonial rule was what Koreans wanted".

On October 28, 2003, Shintaro Ishihara, then Governor of Tokyo, stated: "The annexation of Korea and Japan was Koreans' choice ... the ones to be blamed are the ancestors of Koreans."

In 2007, Hakubun Shimomura, then Deputy Chief Cabinet Secretary of the Japanese government, stated: "The comfort women system existed, but I believe it was because Korean parents sold their daughters at that time."

On March 27, 2010, on the centennial of Japan–Korean annexation, Yukio Edano, then Japanese Minister of State for Government Revitalization, stated that "The invasion and colonization of China and Korea was historically inevitable ... since China and Korea could not modernize themselves."

=== Censorship of Japanese media in South Korea ===
After the end of Japanese Occupation, Japanese cultural products such as music, film, and books were banned in both North and South Korea. The boycott was lifted in South Korea starting in 1998. Some Japanese cultural items, including but not limited to manga, anime, and music, have been introduced into South Korea even while they were banned (the South Korean public was not informed of their Japanese origin, though people mostly knew that they were).

The Japanese anime Hetalia: Axis Powers, a satire series that personifies various nations created by Hidekaz Himaruya, was banned from airing on the Japanese TV Station, Kid Station, after many protests arrived from South Korea about how the character that represents South Korea was a disgrace and did not represent South Koreans correctly. This is in spite of the fact that a Korean character does not appear in any episode of the animated series, though it appears on web comic versions. The animation continues to see distribution through mobile networks and internet streaming.

On 1 January 2004, all Japanese films were allowed to be shown in theaters, and all Japanese music and video games could be sold by retailers. For satellite and cable television, programming now allowed was lifestyle information programs, educational programs, Japanese music, Japanese films (those screening in theatres), and television dramas that were Japan–Korea productions or had a 7+, 12+ or general rating. For terrestrial television, allowed programming was lifestyle information programs, educational programs, non-animated Japanese films (those screening in theatres), television dramas that were Japan–Korea productions, live broadcasts of Japanese singers' concerts in South Korea, and Japanese singers appearing on Korean programs. The ban on animation was lifted completely on 1 January 2006.

=== Kidnapping of Japanese citizens by North Korea ===
A 13-year-old junior high school student from Niigata, Megumi Yokota, was kidnapped by North Korea on November 15, 1977. In addition to her, many other Japanese citizens were kidnapped by North Korean agents. In 2002, North Korea admitted to kidnapping 13 Japanese citizens during the 1970s and 1980s, in order to train spies to infiltrate U.S. military installations in Japan. Five people have been released, but the North Korean government claimed that there were eight dead. Japan has pressed for the return of the bodies. However, the Japanese government believes that there are still kidnapped Japanese citizens being held captive in North Korea. North Korea's official statement is that the issue has been settled. Because of the overwhelming number of South Koreans also kidnapped by North Korea, there have been some joint efforts by South Korea and Japan to retrieve their citizens. The issue remains unresolved, but Japan has insisted on an explanation of what happened to their citizens as a precondition for normalizing relations with North Korea.

=== Korean influence on early Japanese culture ===
Archeological evidence shows that Korea has historically acted as a cross-roads through which, as part of a long history of contact, several important Chinese innovations in culture and technology were transferred to Japan. Several linguistic theories make similar points. In these theories, practices like wet-rice farming, a new style of pottery, metallurgy, and writing were introduced from China and Korea. Buddhism was first introduced to Japan from Baekje in Korea, but the subsequent development of Japanese Buddhism was primarily influenced by China. Other cultural artifacts that have now become traditional cultural artifacts of Japan, such as the oil-paper umbrella, are also believed to have been introduced via Korea. Prince Asa, a Korean from Baekje, is known to have been Prince Shōtoku's tutor. Emperor Kanmu's mother Takano no Niigasa was of Korean descent, a fact admitted by Emperor Akihito during a press conference in 2001.

Many national treasures from Japan's early history, such as the Kōryū-ji sculptures, are based on Korean prototypes or were made in Korea. In 1976, Japan stopped all foreign archaeologists from studying the circa 2nd century BC Gosashi tomb in Nara Prefecture, believed to be the resting place of Empress Jingū. In 2008, Japan allowed controlled, limited access to foreign archaeologists, but the international community still has many unanswered questions. National Geographic News reported that "the agency has kept access to the tombs restricted, prompting rumors that officials fear excavation would reveal bloodline links between the 'pure' imperial family and Korea—or that some tombs hold no royal remains at all.".

=== Plagiarism of Japanese products ===
South Korea has been accused of plagiarizing Japanese products. In 2007, a K-pop singer, Ivy, was accused of copying a scene from the Japanese video game movie adaptation Final Fantasy VII: Advent Children in one of her music videos. The court ordered that the video be banned from airing on television, stating that "most of the clip is noticeably similar to scenes from the film".

=== Zainichi Koreans ===
Koreans are the third largest group of foreign nationals living in Japan, before the Chinese, Filipinos, and after the Brazilians and Peruvians. Ethnicity censuses are not available in Japan, what leaves naturalized citizens that are part of these and other immigrant populations, as well historical groups with their own identity such as the Ryukyuans, the Ainu and the mixed-race Japanese invisible, so figures giving Yamato people an amount of about 98.5% of the Japanese population are very likely exaggerated.

Zainichi (在日; resident of Japan) Korean refers to ethnic Koreans currently residing in Japan. Most of them are second-, third-, or fourth-generation Koreans who have not applied for Japanese citizenship. Japanese law asserts that, to be a citizen of Japan, one must abdicate of every other citizenship. Some were either forced to relocate to or willingly immigrated to Japan during the Japanese occupation of Korea, while others entered Japan illegally in order to escape the Korean War that took place after the Japanese occupation. They lost their Japanese citizenship after the signing of the San Francisco Peace Treaty, which officially ended the Japanese annexation of Korea and their country of origin, Korea, no longer existed when South Korea and North Korea became separate states. Zainichi communities are split based upon affiliation with North or South Korea (Chongryon and Mindan). It is claimed that two or three of the leaders of the smaller organized crime syndicates found on a list of more than twenty such groups as specified by the National Police Agency in Japan may be ethnic Koreans.

Utoro district, an ethnic enclave of former Korean forced laborers and their families, has been a target of anti-Korean sentiment, with a Japanese man motivated by hatred for Koreans setting fire to a home in the area in 2022.

More positively speaking, Masayoshi Son (Son Jeong-ui), a businessman and CEO of Japanese telecom giant SoftBank, is of Zainichi background. In addition, some of Japan's baseball players and martial artists were of Zainichi Korean background, including Rikidōzan (Kim Sin-rak), Mas Oyama (Choi Yeong-eui), Isao Harimoto (Jang Hun), and Masaichi Kaneda (Kim Kyung-hong). To avoid discrimination, some Zainichi Koreans have adopted Japanese names. Today, however, as the relationship between Japan and South Korea has improved, there also exist many Zainichi Koreans or former Zainichi Koreans with Japanese nationality who do not hide their origin and are in full activity, such as Yu Miri, an Akutagawa Prize-winning playwright and Tadanari Lee (Lee Chung-Sung), a Japanese football player of Korean origin.

=== Kimchi exports ===
In the 1990s, a dispute arose regarding the marketing of kimchi, considered to be a traditional Korean dish. Kimchi was growing in popularity, and its consumption and production were expanding. Korean manufacturers, however, argued that Japanese kimchi is fundamentally different, in that Japanese manufacturers often skip fermentation and mimic the flavors through the use of additives. South Korean producers argued that this made the product fundamentally different from kimchi, while Japanese producers argued they were simply altering the product to fit local tastes. In 2000, South Korea began lobbying the makers of the Codex Alimentarius, an international food-standards maker which provides voluntary advice to national food agencies, to designate kimchi as only that which is produced in the traditional Korean style. In 2001, the Codex Alimentarius published a voluntary standard defining kimchi as "a fermented food that uses salted napa cabbages as its main ingredient mixed with seasonings, and goes through a lactic acid production process at a low temperature", but which did not specify a minimum amount of fermentation or forbid the use of additives.

=== Ban on Japanese seafood products ===
From 2013, South Korea banned all seafood products imported from Fukushima and seven other Japanese prefectures, due to concerns of radioactive contamination from the Fukushima Daiichi nuclear disaster. The Japanese government strongly opposes South Korea's decision on placing the ban, insisting that the country's fisheries exports are safe for consumption, with stringent inspection procedures in place. The ban led Japan to consider taking the issue to the World Trade Organization's dispute settlement process. In April 2019, the WTO upheld the ban.

=== Trade conflict ===
In October and November 2018, there was a decision by the Supreme Court of Korea and many high courts in the country that ordered many Japanese companies, including Mitsubishi Heavy Industries, Nachi-Fujikoshi Corporation, and Nippon Steel to compensate the families of South Koreans who were unfairly treated and illegally forced to supply labor for World War II war efforts. This decisions angers the Japanese government, who claim that the issue was settled under the 1965 treaty of normalization of two countries’ bilateral ties. The Japanese government then, in retaliation, announced they would tighten chemical exports which are vital to South Korean semiconductor industry, such as Hydrogen Fluoride, resist, and fluorinated polyimide on July 1, 2019. These controls, according to the Japanese government, are in place because South Korea fails to comply with Japanese export control security regulations. But South Korea rejects the Japanese government's claims, saying that the move was "economic retaliation".

=== Coronavirus pandemic ===
Diplomatic relations between Japan and South Korea worsened due to the 2020 coronavirus pandemic. South Korea criticised Japan's "ambiguous and passive quarantine efforts", after Japan started to implement travel bans and quarantine measures to limit the spread of the virus from Korea.

=== Discharge of radioactive water of the Fukushima Daiichi Nuclear Power Plant ===
Japan's decision to release Fukushima waste water in April 2021 has emerged as a new source of tensions between the two countries.

Immediately after Japan announced its plans, the South Korean government swiftly condemned the decision and summoned the Japanese ambassador to Seoul to issue a strong protest. Civil protests have ensued across the country as a result of Japan's decision. The South Korean government has been considering legal action against Japan, and various South Korean civil groups and associations have considered the same. Furthermore, South Korea is seeking the cooperation of other countries, such as the U.S., Denmark, and other G7 countries, for support on the issue. The dispute escalated further in June 2021 as the South Korean parliament adopted a resolution condemning Japan's waste water discharge plan, which had passed with support across the political spectrum.

== See also ==
- 2018 Japan–South Korea radar lock-on dispute
- 386 Generation
- American cover-up of Japanese war crimes
- Anti-Japanese sentiment in Korea
- Anti-Korean sentiment in Japan
- Eugenics in Japan
- Hanshin Education Incident
- Hashima Island
- History of Japan–Korea relations
- Japan–North Korea relations
- Japan–South Korea relations
- Japanese nationalism
- Korea under Japanese rule
- Korean ethnic nationalism
- Racism in Japan
- Racism in South Korea
- Sōshi-kaimei
- Uyoku dantai
- Voluntary Agency Network of Korea
- Zaitokukai
