= Moon Ok-ju =

South Korean comfort woman (1924–1996)

- Born: 1924; Daegu, Korea, Empire of Japan
- Died: October 26, 1996 (aged 71–72); Daegu, South Korea
- Education: Gwon-beon
- Known for: Known for her public testimony regarding her experience as a former comfort woman

Moon Ok-ju (Korean: 문옥주; 1924 – 26 October 1996) was a South Korean comfort woman during the Japanese occupation of Korea in World War II. After the war, Moon testified publicly about her experience and life as a comfort woman. Her testimony created controversy about whether she was truly a comfort woman or if she was a prostitute because she received payments for her work. Ultimately, Moon's testimony challenged the idea that she was a prostitute because she gave firsthand accounts of how she was deceived and forced into this work. Her testimony helped lead other comfort women to speak out, which contributed to public recognition of comfort women, to a formal apology from the Japanese government, and to some comfort women receiving compensation for the damage caused.

== Early life ==
Moon was born in 1924 in Daegu, Gyeongsangbuk-do, Korea, Empire of Japan. She grew up in an impoverished household where her father died when she was only eight years old, leaving her mother to raise her and her three siblings.

In 1936, at the age of twelve, she moved to Ōmuta in Kyushu, Japan, to work at a restaurant called Busankan to earn money. The restaurant owner promised that, in return for her work, she would receive education and find a husband. When she started the job, instead of being tasked with the restaurant work, Moon had been promised, she was tasked with caring for children, cleaning, and doing laundry for long hours. After 6 months, she escaped from her workplace and returned to her hometown.

To help support her family, she assisted her mother with household chores, worked part-time at a slipper factory, and attended gwon-beon—a private training school for gisaeng, traditional female entertainers who performed and served at social gatherings for men. As a gisaeng, Moon occasionally sang at social gatherings for patrons to earn an income. She retained the pansori lines and lyrics she had informally learned outside of the gwon-beon classroom. Although her older brother, eight years older than her, had strongly opposed her earlier aspiration to become a gisaeng—deeming it inappropriate for a daughter of a yangban family—he later came to rely on her earnings.

== Japanese military sexual slavery ==
In 1940, when Moon was sixteen years old, two Korean and Japanese military policemen forcibly took her to Dong'ansheng in Manchuria, northeastern China. Alongside other women taken from Daegu, she unwillingly served as a Japanese military comfort woman, serving more than 30 Japanese military policemen or soldiers per day. The owner of the comfort station, also from Daegu, told Moon and the comfort women that he would collect military scrip and later pay them the equivalent amount once they returned to Korea. However, aside from small amount of money given locally for necessities, she never received any payment. To survive in the brothel, Moon tried to gain favorable treatment from soldiers who would offer the comfort women small accommodations if the women provided musical entertainment. Moon then requested assistance from a military police officer to obtain a train ticket to her hometown, assuring him that she would return after caring for her ill mother. In the fall of 1941, she was able to return home in Busan.

Shortly after she returned to her home in Busan, Japanese military personnel abducted Moon again in July 1942, deceiving her with promises of paid employment in a military dining facility. The Japanese military personnel took her to a brothel in Burma (present-day Myanmar), where she was once more forced into sexual slavery. Drawing on the strategies she had developed in Manchuria, she attempted to maintain favorable relations with the soldiers to protect herself. She listened calmly to their stories of family and hometown life and sang Japanese songs to lift their mood. These actions functioned both as a method of self-preservation—especially when facing soldiers who viewed Koreans with disdain or who were prone to violence—and as a means of securing small gratuities from officers. She attended officers' welcome and farewell gatherings when requested and worked to earn money in the form of tips. She deposited the tips she received through the military field post system, with the intention of sending the funds home to support her family. However, the money never reached her family back home.

As World War II intensified, the military orders relocated Moon to a comfort station in Mandalay that operated alongside “Date 8400 Division.” She never received the wages the Japanese soldiers had promised. In the spring of 1943, the Japanese military soldiers moved her from Mandalay to Akyab, then to Prome and Yangon, following the general movements of the division while evading air raids and advancing Allied forces. Throughout these retreats, Japanese soldiers continued to demand sexual services. Whenever military headquarters demanded the services, she was required to comply. In the spring of 1945, after Japan's defeat in Myanmar, the military transported her by truck to Thailand, where she was liberated. She then traveled by ship and arrived in Incheon.

=== After World War II ===
She returned home in 1946 after World War II, having endured six years as a comfort woman. However, her family viewed her as a source of shame and did not welcome her back home. About a year after returning home, Moon's mother arranged for her to enter the Dalseong gwon-beon training institute when Moon was twenty-two years old. Moon spent approximately three years there receiving training and occasionally performing as a gisaeng. After graduating from Dalseong, she worked in a yugwak (licensed entertainment district) in Daegu, where she met a businessman surnamed Kim, who managed a company called Joseon Gongjak Co., and later married him. When Kim's business failed, he died by suicide leaving her without financial support. Moon then resumed work as a gisaeng to support her children and her mother, which she recalled occurred when she was around thirty-two years old.

She had saved tips through the military field post system but never received the 26,145 yen she had saved, and with the interest accrued after the war, the balance as of 1965—when the Treaty on Basic Relations Between Japan and the Republic of Korea was concluded—the total was 50,108 yen. She filed a lawsuit in Japan seeking compensation and the return of the money she had saved at the time. However, 5 years later, she testified that her lawsuit had not been successful and was therefore not able to retrieve her money. She died on October 26, 1996, in the early morning at Daegu Dongsan Hospital.

== Activism and impact ==
=== Testimony and movement ===
In 1990, officials from the Japanese government declared that Japan bore no responsibility for the comfort women system, contesting allegations of the coercive exploitation of young women from multiple nations and the operation of military-operated comfort stations.

On August 14, 1991, Moon became the second person in South Korea after Kim Hak-sun to come forward publicly about her experience as a survivor of the Japanese sexual slavery system. Hak-sun, who had contacted a women's rights group, gave her testimony at a South Korean public broadcast service. Hak-sun's testimony prompted Moon to speak out as she did in her memoir written by Machiko Marikawa. In spite of testimonies, the Japanese government denied Moon's and the other women's claims that they were coerced into sexual slavery.

In her testimony, Moon, documented her journey across multiple comfort stations in East and Southeast Asia, providing first-hand evidence of the coercion and violence in the Japanese military comfort women system. After many other women spoke out, in 2012, the Japanese government began recognizing comfort woman and celebrate the International Memorial Day for Comfort Women on August 14, when it became an official national memorial day in South Korea.

=== After the testimony ===
Moon and Kim's public testimonies encouraged other victims of Japanese military sexual slavery to share their experiences as comfort women. Reports from survivors increased significantly after the testimonies, and former comfort women provided additional testimonies that contributed to the growing documentation of the comfort women issue.

Moon and Kim's testimonies also led the Korean Council for the Women Drafted for Military Sexual Slavery by Japan (hereafter, “the Korean Council”) to initiate regular public demonstrations on 11 December 1991. On 8 January 1992, survivors and women's organizations held the first Weekly Wednesday Demonstration, calling for an official apology from the Japanese government for its role in the mobilization of comfort women during the Second World War. The Korean Council coordinated these demonstrations in collaboration with affiliated groups, including women's organizations, social and peace groups, religious communities, and student associations.

Moon later served as a plaintiff in the Asian Pacific War Korean Victims Compensation Claim Lawsuit. She also participated in a range of transnational advocacy activities, including the Second Asian Solidarity Conference and Japan tour meeting.

In March 1992, Moon filed a claim against the Shimonoseki Post Office in Japan to receive payment for the military postal savings of 26,145 yen she stated she had deposited from tips received during her time as a comfort woman. However, Japan claimed that individual rights to claims were extinguished under the 1965 Korea-Japan Claims Agreement, and therefore would not return the military postal savings of Koreans. She never received the financial compensation.

=== Machiko Morikawa and Moon's collaboration ===
Machiko Morikawa, a Japanese human rights activist and a freelance writer, visited Moon in Daegu in September 1993, asking Moon's permission to write her biography, and Moon consented. Over the following three years, she visited Daegu on eighteen occasions, typically staying for two to four days at a time to record Moon's testimony. Although Moon sometimes insisted she had nothing more to share, she often recalled additional memories just as Morikawa prepared to leave for Fukuoka. After completing a substantial portion of the interviews, Morikawa conducted field research in Myanmar in February 1995 to verify and contextualize Moon's recollections. In 1996, Morikawa published the book Moon Ok-ju: I was a "Comfort Woman" for the Date Division on the Burma Front in Japan, later translated into Korean and published in 2005.

Machiko's project of recording Moon' life alongside historical sources contributed to a broader recognition of the suffering endured by victims who died without leaving testimonies and by those who continue to conceal their experiences, while also preserving the history of women's experiences in Myanmar during the Asia–Pacific War. Her research further established consistency between Moon's testimony and a diary kept by Park Chi-geun, a Korean manager of a Japanese military comfort station, which was discovered in South Korea. Morikawa also formed the “Group for Finding Military Postal Savings” and subsequently located at the Kumamoto Postal Savings Service Center an account ledger belonging to a Korean woman, indicating a balance exceeding 50,000 yen including accrued interest. Together, Moon's testimony and Machiko's documentation provide evidence that the Japanese military recruited and deployed comfort women to war fronts and that some Koreans participated in the system's operation.

== Debates over prostitution and sexual slavery ==
While the majority of the comfort women received little to no remuneration, Moon reportedly earned substantial income during her time in the system through tips, though she was not able to access most of these earnings. Moon's receipt of tips for her work as a comfort woman has sparked considerable debate among scholars and commentators. Right wing groups both in Japan and Korea claim that comfort women were not sex slaves but instead an extension of the system of prostitution.

In 2016, right-wing historian Ikuhiko Hata claimed that Moon's savings were evidence that comfort stations functioned as "licensed brothels moved to the battlefield," and claimed she had earned more than even the highest-ranking officers in Myanmar. However, historian Yoshimi Yoshiaki, a leading scholar on the issue, countered that most victims never received payment at all, and that Moon's case should not be misused to distort the nature of the system. This controversy has reverberated in global public discourse as well. The documentary Shusenjo: The Main Battleground of the Comfort Women Issue (2024) presents a range of perspectives on the controversy, including interviews with individuals in the United States whose views parallel right-winged Japanese arguments that comfort women should be characterized as prostitutes who received compensation for their work.

=== Ramseyer's Claims and subsequent scholarly criticism ===
One influential and widely debated intervention in the comfort women controversy came from Harvard Law Professor J. Mark Ramseyer. In the article “Contracting for Sex in the Pacific War,” published in the International Review of Law and Economics in December 2021, Ramseyer challenged the notion that Japan comfort women system operated on contractual, rather than coercive, terms. He claimed that women agreed to work in military brothels as prostitutes for fixed periods and cited Moon Ok-ju as an example, pointing to her reported tips which she was said to have saved, as evidence of financial remuneration. Ramseyer further argued that Moon's ability to leave the brothel and return home indicated that her labor was voluntary rather than forced. His article generated significant controversy because it challenged the prevailing scholarly consensus that the comfort women system involved coercion and state-organized sexual violence.

Other mainstream historians, human rights activists, and feminists have rejected Ramseyer's claim that comfort women voluntarily entered prostitution contracts during the wars. They argue that due to survivor testimony and research that documents coercion and lack of consent, the comfort women system functioned as a form of sexual violence, military exploitation, and deception. In their research, they found that because comfort women stations were highly weaponized and operated under the conditions of military control, escape was difficult without the fear of violent retaliation and punishment. Several historians have identified several methodological problems in Ramseyer's article, noting that he does not provide any actual wartime contracts involving Korean comfort women and instead bases his analysis on prewar Japanese licensed prostitution contracts, which come from a different period and legal context. According to Stanley, Schieder, Ambaras, Shepherd, and Chatani (2021), this creates a misleading comparison because Ramseyer assumes that contractual practices documented in Japan before the war can be used to characterize the experiences of Korean comfort women during World War II, despite the absence of direct evidence. Their review concludes that Ramseyer's interpretation selectively draws from official Japanese discourse and ignores the firsthand accounts of comfort women during the wars.
