= Comfort Woman =

A comfort woman was a woman forced into sexual slavery by the Imperial Japanese Army in occupied territories before and during World War II.

Comfort Woman may also refer to:

- Comfort Woman (album) by Me'shell Ndegeocello
- Comfort Woman (novel) by Nora Okja Keller
- Comfort women in the arts
