= Gil Won-ok =

South Korean activist (1928–2025)

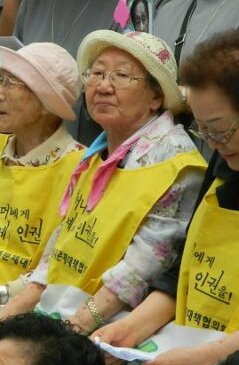
- Gil protesting in front of the Japanese embassy in Korea in August 2011
- Born: 30 November 1928; Huichon, Korea, Empire of Japan
- Died: 16 February 2025 (aged 96); Incheon, South Korea
- Known for: Activism for comfort women
- Children: 1

Korean name
- Hangul: 길원옥
- Hanja: 吉元玉
- RR: Gil Wonok
- MR: Kil Wŏnok

Gil Won-ok (Korean: 길원옥, 30 November 1928 – 16 February 2025), also known as Grandma Gil, was a Korean activist who was forced into becoming a comfort woman during World War II. She dedicated her life to demanding redress and an official apology from Japan for the military sexual violence that affected over 200,000 women in the war.

== Early life ==
Gil Won-ok was born in 1928, probably on 30 November, in Huichon, Korea, Empire of Japan, and spent her early years in Pyongyang.

In 1940, at the age of thirteen, Gil boarded a train to a Japanese factory where she was promised work. Instead of being taken to a factory, Gil was taken to Harbin, Manchuria, and brought to a comfort station in the winter of 1940 where, from thirteen to eighteen years old, she was repeatedly sexually assaulted by Japanese soldiers. During the years Gil spent as a victim of military sexual slavery, she contracted syphilis, which generated tumors in her body, leading to four surgeries. Complications from surgery prompted doctors to give Gil a hysterectomy which left her sterile. After the war, Gil tried to go back home to North Korea, but when she got to the border, it was closed and she was never was able to return. She later operated a food stand and sold Korean rice wine.

== Activist work ==
In 1998, Gil followed the lead of previous comfort women and publicly came out about the sexual violence inflicted upon her for five years. Gil later became an activist, advocating for an official apology from Japan for the crimes they committed during World War II. Even though she was unable to bear children, she adopted a son after he was left at a gambling house where she worked. He is now a minister. In later years, Gil lived with other former comfort women in a home run by The Korean Council for the Women Drafted for Military Sexual Slavery by Japan called Our Peaceful House.

After she publicly came out about the violent crimes that were inflicted upon her by the Japanese Imperial Army, she vowed to dedicate the rest of her life to demanding an official apology from Japan, as they failed to take accountability for the crimes that were committed during World War II. Every Wednesday, Gil participated in the Wednesday Demonstrations, which have been held every week since 8 January 1992, in front of the Japanese Embassy in Korea as an act of protest. Along with participating in the Wednesday Demonstrations, Gil travelled the world speaking at locations including the Japanese Women's University, sharing her story while also advocating for an official apology from Japan. She also participated in the 100 Million Petition Campaign, where the goal was to gather 100 million signatures demanding redress for comfort women. In 2014, Gil traveled to Geneva, Switzerland, where she delivered a petition of 1.5 million signatures to the Office of the United Nations High Commissioner for Human Rights at the United Nations.

=== The Butterfly Fund ===
In 2012, Gil and another former comfort woman, Kim Bok-dong, started The Butterfly Fund with the help of The Korean Council for the Women Drafted for Military Sexual Slavery by Japan as a way to help victims of sexual war crimes around the world. Both women vowed to donate all the funds they received as compensation for the war crimes that were inflicted on them in order to help women who were put in similar situations to theirs. Some of the individuals who were recipients of the fund include victims of the Second Congo War along with rape victims from the Vietnam War whose violence was inflicted by Koreans.

== The Apology ==
The 2016 documentary film The Apology, directed by Tiffany Hsiung, follows three former comfort women who share their personal stories as victims of wartime sexual slavery, while also focusing on the ways in which they are demanding an official apology from Japan. The film focuses on Gil's personal experience as a comfort woman, while also following her through her travel as an activist. In the film, Gil travels to the Japanese Women's University, China, and finally Switzerland where she presented the United Nations a petition of 1.5 million signatures demanding redress for the 200,000 women who were victims of wartime sexual slavery.

== Personal life and death ==
Gil had one son, whom she adopted. Sources differ on if she was ever married; The Washington Post said she had a brief marriage that ended in divorce, while The New York Times said she never married.

Gil's health declined in her later years due to Alzheimer's disease, and she died at her home in Incheon on 16 February 2025, at the age of 96. (Note: Sources mislabel her age as "97".)
