= Yoon Mee-hyang =

South Korean activist and politician (born 1964)

- 윤미향
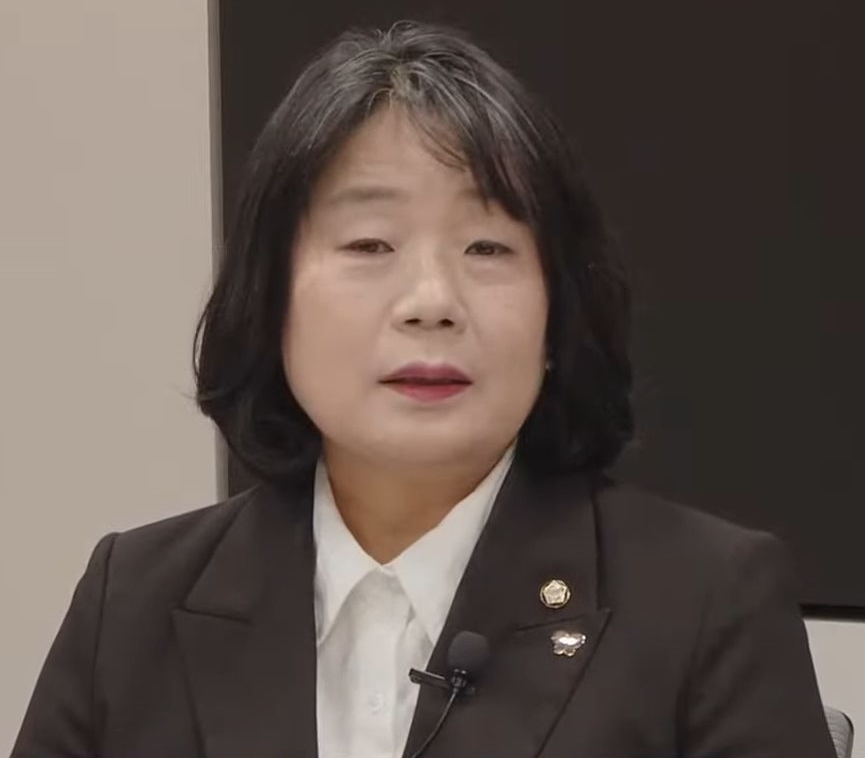

Member of the National Assembly
- In office May 30, 2020 – May 30, 2024
- Constituency: Proportional representation

Personal details
- Born: October 23, 1964 (age 62) Namhae County, South Gyeongsang Province, South Korea
- Party: Democratic Party of Korea (2020-present)
- Other political affiliations: Platform Party (2020)
- Spouse: Kim Sam-seok
- Education: Hanshin University; Ewha Womans University

Korean name
- Hangul: 윤미향
- Hanja: 尹美香
- RR: Yun Mihyang
- MR: Yun Mihyang

Yoon Mee-hyang (Korean: 윤미향; born 1964) is a South Korean human rights activist, politician, and author. She was the former head of the Korean Council for Justice and Remembrance for the Issues of Military Sexual Slavery by Japan, an organization dedicated to advocacy for former comfort women, who were forced into sexual slavery during World War II. She is the author of 25 Years of Wednesdays: The Story of the "Comfort Women" and the Wednesday Demonstrations.

In April 2020, Yoon was elected to National Assembly of the Republic of Korea, in a seat allocated by proportional representation.

In September 2020 Yoon was suspended from the Democratic Party after being indicted by the Seoul Western District Prosecutors' Office on eight charges including fraud, embezzlement and breach of trust for misappropriating donations and government subsidies from the comfort women advocacy organization she was leading.

== Education ==
Yoon was born in Namhae, South Gyeongsang Province, in 1964. She graduated from Hanshin University in 1987 and earned a master's degree in social welfare from Ewha Womans University in 2007.

== Advocacy ==
Since the 1990s, Yoon has been a leader of the Korean Council for the Women Drafted for Military Sexual Slavery by Japan, now called the Korean Council for Justice and Remembrance for the Issues of Military Sexual Slavery by Japan. The organization was established in 1990 to advocate for the rights of former comfort women. Since January 1992, the council has organized over 1000 weekly rallies in front of the Japanese embassy in Seoul to raise awareness of the issue of war violence against women. The group has called upon the Japanese government to issue a formal apology and compensation to former comfort women.

Yoon's book on the subject, 20 Years of Wednesdays: The Unshakable Hope of the Halmoni - Former Japanese Military Comfort Women (20년간의 수요일 : 일본군 '위안부' 할머니들이 외치는 당당한 희망), was published in 2010 in Korean, and translated into Japanese the following year. A 2016 follow-up, 25 Years of Wednesdays (25 년간의 수요일), included information on the new agreement between the Korean and Japanese governments to peacefully resolve the issue. An English translation by Koeun Lee was published in 2019.

Yoon established the War and Women's Human Rights Museum in Seoul in 2012. She has also served as a founding member of the Korea Women's Foundation and as executive director of the Women's Subcommittee of the National Reunification Movement. Yoon appears in The Apology, a documentary film directed by Tiffany Hsiung and featuring former comfort women Gil Won-Ok, Adela Reyes Barroquillo, and Cao Hei Mao.

== Election ==
On April 15, 2020, Yoon was elected to a proportional representation National Assembly seat as a candidate of the Platform Party, a satellite party of the Democratic Party of Korea.

== Controversy ==
In May 2020, Lee Yong-soo, a 91 year old comfort woman survivor, accused Yoon of not using the public donations to benefit the comfort women victims. In a press conference, Lee Yong-soo accused Yoon and her organization of financially and politically exploiting the survivors for 30 years. Lee also stated that Yoon "must not become a member of the National Assembly. She must first solve this problem." Lee stated she did not support Yoon's parliamentary candidacy and accused Yoon of lying about having her support during the election.

The Democratic Party of Korea suspended the party membership of Yoon, who became a proportional lawmaker based on her career of supporting comfort women survivors. In 2024, Yoon was convicted of fraudulently receiving government subsidies and unlawfully collecting donations and was sentenced to 1.5 years imprisonment, suspended for three years.

== Awards and honours ==
In 2012, Yoon was awarded the 9th annual Seoul Women's Award.

In 2013, Yoon was awarded the Late Spring Unification Award, given to individuals who have contributed to national reconciliation and reunification. The same year, she was named a co-winner of Hanshin University's Hanshin Prize, given to individuals for their outstanding contributions to society.
