= Kang Duk-kyung =

South Korean activist (1929–1997)

- Hangul: 강덕경
- Hanja: 姜徳景
- RR: Gang Deokgyeong
- MR: Kang Tŏkkyŏng

Kang Duk-kyung (1929–1997) was a Korean comfort woman in the Japanese colonial era during World War II. She was captured and forcefully taken into sexual slavery by a Japanese soldier in the middle of the night. After liberation in 1945, she could not return to her hometown because of what had happened to her as a comfort woman. Kang Duk-kyung later became a human rights activist. She started to live in the House of Sharing in late 1992. While staying at the House of Sharing, she participated in an art therapy program where she began painting. Her art centers on her experiences as a 'comfort woman.'

== Background ==
Kang Duk-kyung was born in Jinju, South Gyeongsang Province in 1929. Her father died when she was a young girl and her mother was remarried. As a result, she lived in her grandmother's house. She was a 14-year-old student at Yoshino School when one of her male Japanese teachers advised her to enter the Hujikosi airplane factory to work. He said it was a decent, well paying job. Kang Duk-kyung stated, “One hundred fifty people got on a ferryboat in Busan because their Japanese teachers said it was a good opportunity to earn money.” She eventually left the Hujikosi airplane factory in 1944 when she experienced hard working conditions and faced hunger. Several months later, at 15 years old, she was captured and taken by a soldier in the middle of the night. This was the beginning of her life as a militarized sex slave.

Kang Duk-kyung returned home a year after Korea's liberation, in January 1946. During this time she had also given birth to a baby. In returning home with child, Kang Duk-kyung's mother kicked her out of the house. With little support, Kang Duk-kyung decided to leave her child with a Catholic orphanage in Busan. Kang Duk-kyung stated, “I had no affection for my child at that time.” Her feelings towards her child eventually changed. She was working in a restaurant in Busan and decided to go visit the baby one day, only to be informed that her baby had died. She was told that the cause of the child's death was pneumonia and was not permitted to identify the body. Kang stated “I still don't believe it because I haven't seen my child in real life. Since then, I have been devastated.” Her experience as a 'comfort woman' also left her with lifelong debilitating health issues. Her reproductive system was compromised and she poured most of her money into medical bills throughout her life.

Kang Duk-kyung died of lung cancer in 1997, after a long illness.

== Activism ==
Soon after Kim Hak-sun came forward with her story in 1991, Kang Duk-kyung began speaking publicly about her experiences as well. She moved into the House of Sharing along with Kim Bok-dong and Kim Soon-duk. Like the other survivor-residents, Kang Duk-kyung was upset that the Japanese government and military denied their involvement with the torture that she and others had endured during their time as ‘comfort women.’ She committed to advocating and bringing awareness to the issue of sexual slavery and the lives of other ‘comfort women.’ She protested and raised awareness with many broadcast and media interviews. She became one of the movement's most outspoken members, testifying at the United Nations Human Rights Council in Geneva and at an assembly in Japan at the invitation of a Japanese civic group. She fiercely demanded a legal apology from the Japanese government. Kang Duk-kyung faithfully and enthusiastically participated in the Wednesday Demonstrations. Kang Duk-kyung's overall health was failing and she often had to shuffle between being in the intensive care unit and a general ward. Despite this, her enthusiasm and commitment to other ‘comfort women’ and the movement, prevailed. She participated in the Wednesday Demonstration whenever she recovered a bit of strength. In 1996, in the later stage of her cancer battle, Kang Duk-kyung attended the Wednesday demonstration in a hospital ambulance.

Kang Duk-kyung was prolific during her time at the House of Sharing in the art therapy program. Her works have been exhibited globally and contribute to raising awareness of the 'comfort women' issue. Thirty of her artworks, including Stolen Innocence, were put on display in the exhibition hall at the House of Sharing.
