= Kim Soon-duk =

Kim Soon-duk (1921–2004), also known as Kim Tŏk-chin, was a Korean "comfort woman" who became one of the best-known survivors due to her vivid paintings that depicted life as 'comfort women.' She participated in movements against sex slavery including the Wednesday Demonstration. She also travelled abroad to attend exhibits that displayed her paintings, participated in international speaking tours, and testified about her experiences.

After the end of Japanese colonization in Korea, which occurred from 1910 to 1945, many of the atrocities and injustices began to surface. Several activist groups gathered evidence and encouraged victims to come forward. Both Korean and Japanese people pressured the Japanese government to acknowledge its crimes; however, in 1991 the Japanese Embassy in Seoul denied the existence of an official, militarized form of sexual slavery. Kim Hak-sun responded to the Japanese Embassy's official statement and became the first woman to openly testify about her experience as a 'comfort woman.' She inspired other women, including Kim Soon-duk, to come forward with their stories. 'Comfort Women,' along with their supporters, continue to fight against sexual violence and confront the Japanese government to acknowledge their crimes and compensate the victims.

== Background ==
Kim Soon-duk was born in 1921 and grew up in a poor family in South Kyongsang Province. Her father died when she was a child. When she was twelve, she worked as a housemaid to help her mother and her four siblings. In 1937, Kim Soon-duk was 16-years-old when she met a Korean man who told her that she would be sent to Japan to work as a well-paid factory worker. Instead, the Korean man took her and about thirty other women to a military brothel that he ran in Shanghai and later to another comfort station in Nanking.

Although she did not have a formal education, she was smart. She was also pretty. She was chosen to serve high-ranking officers and transported into the army unit by car. She developed an intimate relationship with Izumi, a high-ranking Japanese officer in his fifties, and came to rely on him as her father, husband, and family. She was a 'comfort woman' for three years from 1937 to 1940.

In 1940, Kim Soon-duk and four other women from her village were able to return to Korea due to Izumi's love and concern. She received 100 yen and a white envelope that contained official travel permits that allowed her and her peers to secure lodging, food, and travel by train, truck, and boat. In an interview published in 2008, Kim said:

After returning home, I received letters from Izumi constantly. I sent my replies to him and even sent care packages to him. He would write me thanking me for them, saying that he enjoyed the toasted grain powder, but the chili powder, he wrote, was so hot that it almost killed him, jokingly asking me whether I intended to kill him with it. He would also correct my Japanese spelling and write humorous letters as well….After I moved to Seoul, I continued to receive his letters from Nanking until one or two years before the Liberation. I lost all the letters during the Korean War.

In the early 1990s, Kim Soon-duk was taken to Japan to testify about her experiences during the war. She would actively ask for help from Japanese supporters to find Izumi. In January 1995, a representative of the Korean Council acknowledged that she and her colleagues were embarrassed about Kim Soon-duk's conduct and decided not to take her on their future trips to Japan.

Professor Soh's book, The Comfort Women, which has been referenced to detail the nature of Kim Soon-duk's forced captivity and sexual slavery engages in a dubious amount of historiographical engagement. This is made particularly evident because none of the postwar historiography of the comfort women were ever conducted by Soh herself, and instead she chose to interview only other activists and historians. She demonstrates somewhat irresponsible scholarship and negligence as well, which is indicated by the historical inaccuracies of her argument, such as leaving behind inconsistent legal interpretations of international war crimes, as well as names of certain universities. For this reason, Professor Soh's detail of Kim Soon-duk as wanting to reunite with Izumi is disrespectful to the legacy left behind by Kim Soon-duk, and Kim Soon-duk's own efforts to organize around a formal apology from the Japanese government and reparations for these heinous war crimes.

Surviving 'comfort women,' including Kim Soon-duk, lived in a rental house together in the early 1990s. Buddhist groups helped raise funds to support and establish a social welfare facility called the House of Sharing in 1992. Kim Soon-duk moved into the House of Sharing in 1992 with her friend Park Duri. Park Duri would often jokingly salute Kim Soon-duk, who is five years her senior, and turn to her for advice and assistance. In February 1996, the survivor-residents moved to the new, official House of Sharing that consists of residential wings, a recreation room, a Buddhist sanctuary, educational and training activities, and the first "Japanese Comfort Women History Museum in Korea," which opened in August 1998.

Kim Soon-duk died in 2004 when she was 83-years-old. A Buddhist ceremony commemorated her death in the House of Sharing’s shrine.

== Activism ==
In the 1990s, Kim Soon-duk was involved with The Korean Council for the Women Drafted for Sexual Slavery in Japan, also known as the Korean Council, which organizes weekly protests in Seoul. She was a devoted participant in the weekly Wednesday Demonstrations in front of the Japanese embassy in Seoul, which started in 1992 and still occurs today. Kim Soon-duk also went on international speaking tours to raise awareness internationally through her testimonials and artwork. She and Kang Duk-kyung received a lot of attention during the earlier years of the movement for their distinct, vivid paintings, which depicted the lives and stories of 'comfort women.'

In 2000, she shared her wartime explanation at an art show at the San Francisco Arts Commission Gallery:

Kim recalls the day they arrived, the screaming and confusion. "There were thousands of soldiers lined up, with military police at either end. The women resisted very violently. But it was done on a daily basis. Some girls passed out, and they took them to the hospital." The experience was so horrific that "I tried to commit suicide twice," says Kim, who was later sent to a comfort station in Nanking. She spent three years as a sex slave until she became ill with internal bleeding and was sent home. "It was my strong desire to return home and see my family that kept me going."

Kim Soon-duk hoped that her artwork would:

[Send] a message to the Japanese government, because they haven't issued a formal apology yet. It's (also) a way to send a message to the people in Korea and Japan and all over the world that this shouldn't happen again. This was a horrible experience. Too many innocent people perished and suffered because of this war. My big message is no more war.

The House of Sharing includes a gallery that exhibits Kim Soon-duk's artwork. The House of Sharing also organizes tours to teach the public about her experiences through her paintings. Her famous painting Unblossomed Flower, also inspired the statue of the young girl that stands in the center of the House of Sharing grounds.
