= Lee Yong-soo (activist) =

Korean activist and comfort woman

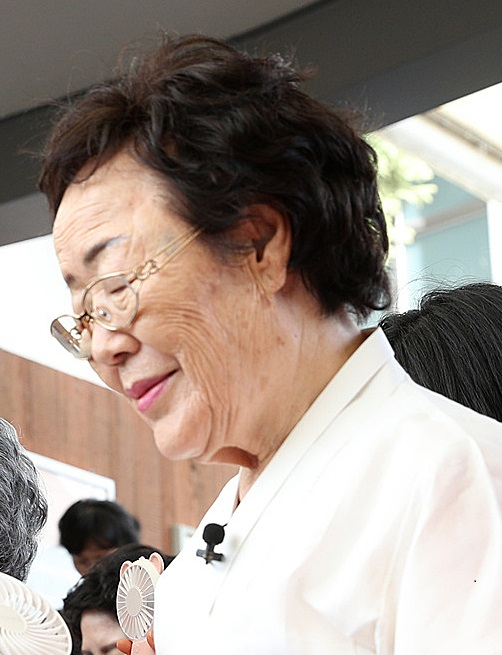
- Lee Yong-soo at the House of Sharing, Gwangju in 2018
- Born: December 13, 1928 (age 97); Daegu, Japanese Korea
- Occupation: Activist

Korean name
- Hangul: 이용수
- RR: I Yongsu
- MR: I Yongsu

Lee Yong-soo (Korean: 이용수; born December 13, 1928) is a former comfort woman from South Korea. Lee was forced to serve as a comfort woman during World War II by the Imperial Japanese Army. She is one of the youngest comfort women still living.

== Biography ==
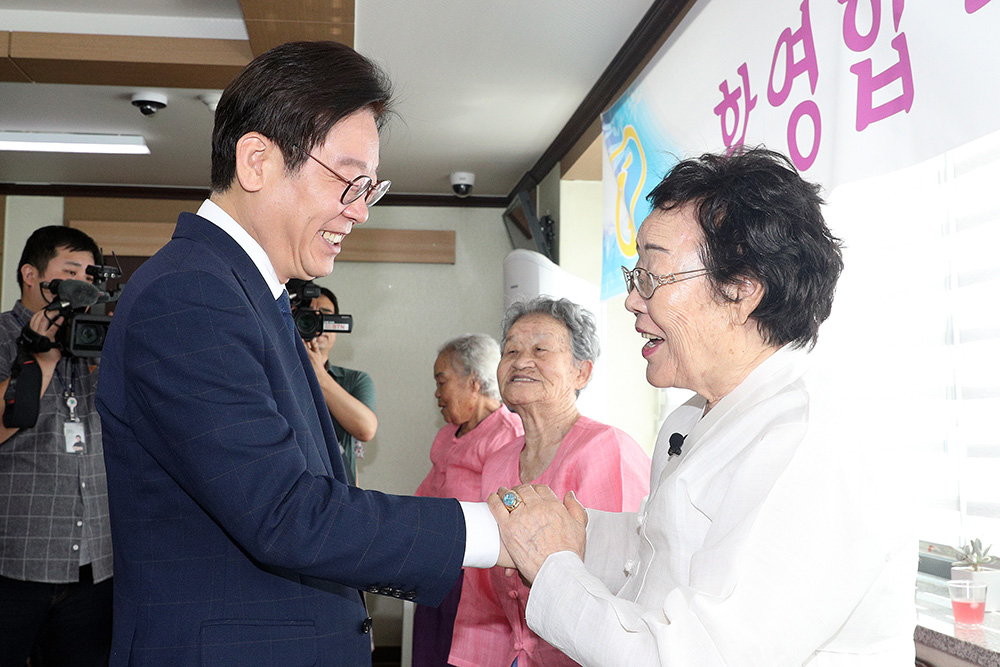
President Lee Jae Myung and Lee Yong-soo in 2018.

Lee Yong-soo was born in Daegu, South Korea on December 13, 1928. Lee was sixteen when she was forced to become a comfort woman. She was outside near a riverbank, catching snails with her friend Bunsun, when both were captured by a military man. She and her friend were taken by train, and then switched to a boat at Anju. On the boat, which was headed to a Kamikaze Unit in Hsinchu County, Taiwan, she was raped for the first time. She recalls that on average, she was forced into sexual relations with four to five men a day and did not have any rest even when she was menstruating. She also says that she "suffered electrical torture, was beaten and was cut by a soldier's knife." She learned quickly to submit so that she would not be shocked or beaten again. Lee says that she never thought to run away because she did not know how to leave the area even if she did escape. Additionally, she was isolated from the other comfort women in her area. After the war and her return home, she said that her family no longer recognized her and she did not feel fit to get married. She was ashamed of what happened to her, and did not realize that it had also happened to so many other women.

Lee first came forward to testify about her experience as a comfort woman in June 1992. She was influenced by Kim Hak-sun's press conference on TV to finally talk to others. Yong-soo registered with the Korean government as a comfort woman. She was the twenty-ninth woman to testify about her experiences. Coming forward gave her life a true purpose: "I thought I was worthless. I didn't talk about it, and nobody asked me. Until the women came out, I did not exist."

In 1996, Lee attended Kyungpook National University and eventually received her master's degree in 2001.

At the Women's International War Crimes Tribunal on Japan's Military Sexual Slavery held in Tokyo in 2000, she testified about what happened to her during World War II, and then later shared her story at the U.S. Holocaust Memorial Museum.

In 2007, she testified in front of the United States joint Congressional session about her experiences during World War II. She said, "I am an honorable daughter of Korea, I am not a comfort woman." Her experience at the hands of the Japanese Army was described as "traumatic." After her testimony, the Prime Minister of Japan, Shinzo Abe, came out and denied that Japan was culpable and that a formal apology from Japan's cabinet in 1993 was not necessary. Nevertheless, the outcome of her testimony (along with the testimony of two other comfort women) led to the House passing a resolution which asked the Japanese government to apologize formally to former comfort women. The resolution was passed unanimously.

Right-wing elements in the Japanese government have been trying to erase the history of comfort woman from the record. This is what Yong-soo and others are fighting against. In 2014, Lee Yong-soo met with Pope Francis. As a devout Catholic, she hoped that the Pope could help end their pain.

In 2015, she attended the South Korean National Assembly's exhibition of art created by former comfort women. Later, she traveled to San Francisco to receive a commendation award from city council and also to ask the city to install a memorial to former comfort women. She was a guest of California Representative Mike Honda in 2015. Yong-soo also participated in protests in the United States when Prime Minister Abe visited.

Lee Yong-soo continues to participate in weekly demonstrations held on Wednesdays in front of the Japanese Embassy. She always wears a traditional Korean hanbok, including the dongjeong, beoseon and gomusin so that everyone who sees her knows that "I am a Joseon daughter. I am an honorable Korean." She says, "I don't want to advertise that I am a comfort women victim. Rather, I want to be a problem solver that can ensure that there will be no other victims of war such as us." She says that she will not give up until Prime Minister Abe acknowledges the truth of her and other women's testimonies.

In May 2020, Lee accused the Korean Council for Justice and Remembrance and Yoon Mee-hyang, the former head, of misusing funds and embezzlement. As a result, Lee said she would no longer attend the Wednesday demonstrations and called for Yoon Mee-hyang to resign from her position as a member of the National Assembly. However, on May 27, Lee made a surprise appearance at one of the Wednesday demonstrations in Daegu.

On March 3, 2021, Lee Yong-soo met Foreign Minister Chung Eui-yong. She asked the Korean government to raise the issue of Japanese military sexual slavery at the International Court of Justice (ICJ). While referring to Harvard law professor J. Mark Ramseyer, who claimed in his paper "Contracting for sex in the Pacific War" that Korean women voluntarily chose to be comfort women, she said, "That professor should be dragged to the ICJ too."
