= The Korean Council for the Women Drafted for Military Sexual Slavery by Japan =

Korean non-governmental organization

- Formation: 1990; 36 years ago
- Legal status: NGO
- Purpose: to restore the rights of the women; to stop war crimes against women; to build peace in Asia
- Headquarters: Mapo-gu, Seoul, Republic of Korea
- Official language: Korean
- Website: http://www.womenandwar.net/contents/main/main.asp

The Korean Council for the Women Drafted for Military Sexual Slavery by Japan (commonly known as The Korean Council) is a Korean non-governmental organization advocating the rights of the surviving comfort women and lobbying the Japanese government to take actions of a full apology and compensation.

Since its foundation in 1990, the Korean Council has been operating on national and transnational stages. Within South Korea, the council has been helping the former comfort women and encouraging the Korean government to resolve the issue. At the same time, the council has been asserting responsibilities of Japan and bringing the issue to international human rights forum such as the UN Commission on Human Rights and the Asian Solidarity Conference. The movements of the council are directly concerned to recover the human rights of the victims of Japanese military sexual slavery, and are broadly in pursuit of preventing wartime crime against women and building peace.

== History ==
The organization's official English name, The Korean Council for Women Drafted for Military Sexual Slavery by Japan is not a direct translation of its native language name (Korean: 한국정신대문제대책협의회; Hanja: 韓国挺身隊問題対策協議会; RR: Hanguk Jeongsindae Munje Daechaek Hyeobuihoe; MR: Han'guk Chŏngsindae Munje Taech'aek Hyŏbŭihoe; Japanese romanization: Kankoku Teishin-tai Mondai Taisaku Kyōgikai). The phrase "women drafted for military sexual slavery" actually corresponds to the term Korean: 정신대; Hanja: 挺身隊; RR: jeongsindae (Japanese romanization: teishin-tai), which originally signified "volunteer corps" as used by the Japanese government, but later used to obliquely refer to Korean comfort women who serviced the Japanese army. This term jeongsindae (teishin-tai) literally means "voluntarily-submitting-body corps".

Former comfort women and activist Lee Yong-soo has expressed her strong dislike for the term "sexual slavery" because it makes her feel "dirty and embarrassed". In her press conference on May 7, 2020, she reproached the Korean Council for using the term to seek international attention.

=== Background ===
Comfort women (Korean: 위안부; Hanja: 慰安婦; RR: wianbu) are the victims of the Japanese military sexual slavery before and during World War II. Among the estimated total of 200,000 women, 80-90 percent were recruited from Korea because of its status under Japanese colonization. There are 208 officially registered victims in South Korea, although it is very likely that there are more unknown survivors.

The issue of the comfort women began to emerge only in the late 1980s with democratization. In a more open atmosphere, there was a group of progressive Christian women starting to inquire into the issue of comfort women. Subsequently, the claim of a Japanese official completely denying state involvement in the recruitment by laying the blame on the private traffickers triggered the formation of a coalition which established the Korean Council for Women Drafted for Military Sexual Slavery by Japan in November 1990 under the leadership of Yun Chung-ok and Lee Hyo-chae. The Korean Council was a unification of mostly women's groups including the Korea Women's Hotline and Korea Women's Associations United, and a few religious organizations such as the Buddhist Human Rights Committee and the National Council of Churches as well.

=== The early movements ===
In 1991, Kim Hak Sun, a former comfort woman, contacted the Korean Council and revealed her story on televised broadcast. Her initiative encouraged other survivors to share their experiences, so the Korean Council installed a hotline for them. Prompted by a series of revelations, the Ministry of Health and Welfare was established to officially recognize the victims and provide them financial aid, free health care, and the right to rent public housing.

In January 1992, the Korean Council led a protest in front of the Japanese Prime Minister Miyazawa's hotel. Since then, the Wednesday Demonstration began to be held on every Wednesday. The Korean Council urged the Japanese government to take the following actions on behalf of the victims: (1) admission of forced draft of Korean women, (2) official apology, (3) fact-finding, (4) a monument, (5) compensation, and (6) history education.

However, the Japanese government did not intend to comply with the demands. In the investigative report on the issue of comfort women in July 1992, Japan included apologies, yet insisted that "all claims were waived by post-war treaties."

=== Reforming the identity of the Council at the international stage ===
As of 1992, the Korean Council took the comfort women issue to the United Nations by being a participant in the UN Commission on Human Rights and its Sub-Commission as a member of the World Council of Churches, which accredited the Korean Council to attend session of the UN. The World Alliance of Reformed Churches and Asia Pacific Forum on Women, Law & Development came to support the Korean Council as well. The request of the Korean Council to conduct a field mission was approved in the International Commission of Jurists, and two members were dispatched to South Korea, the Philippines, North Korea, and Japan. The conclusion of the mission was that "Japan violated international law and was under obligation to pay compensation to the victims." Subsequently, there have been more recommendations from the UN Human Rights Council, Committee on the Elimination of Discrimination against Women, the International Labour Organization, and the International Commission of Jurists. The advocacy by the Korean Council also brought the resolution of the World Conference on Human Rights in Vienna in 1993 and the World Conference on Women in Beijing in 1995, which contributed to publicize the issue of comfort women at an international level.

As the council initiated the process of lobbying the UN Commission on Human Rights (UNCHR), it resolved to integrate human rights norms. The council was influenced by the concept of reparation by Theo van Boven, which suggests that reparation "not only includes material compensation but also restitution, rehabilitation, satisfaction, and guaranteeing non-repetition." According to his concept, the identity of the Korean Council was reframed as human rights advocacy. Following that, the representatives of the Korean Council filed a request for the indictment of the Japanese Imperial Army to the Tokyo Prosecutor's Office in response to Japan's rejection of providing compensations to individual victims in 1994. The legitimacy of the complaint was brought by van Boven's idea of "obligation to compensate for non-punishment". However, the complaint was denied.

In 2000, the Korean Council submitted co-indictment for the Women's International War Crimes Tribunal on Japan's Military Sexual Slavery with North Korea pursuing to clarify the crimes of the perpetrators and to restore the victims' dignity and justice. In the final decision of the tribunal, Hirohito, the Emperor of Japan during World War II, and others involved in the crime were convicted.

=== Transnational solidarity movements ===
In 1992, the Korean Council held the Asian Solidarity Conference in Seoul for the first time. Japan expressed its solidarity by participating in the Conference, and inviting Korean comfort women to Japan to present their testimonies in public. The Asian Solidarity Conference on the Japanese Military Sexual Slavery functioned as a forum for other victimized countries in Asia such as the Philippines, Taiwan, Indonesia, and China to collaborate in devising strategies and directions. Since 1997, public forums were organized by the Korean Council in Geneva on wartime violence against women. Furthermore, the Korean Council included other cases of violation such as rapes perpetrated by military in Myanmar, Sri Lanka, and Sub-Saharan countries into the proceedings at the UN Commission on Human Rights and its Sub-Commission.

The cooperation with North Korea has been the sole "channel of communication" during the hostile relationship between the North and South in the early 1990s. The two Koreas collaborated from the Geneva forum to conferences in Tokyo and Beijing, and exchanged visits and held symposiums in Seoul and Pyongyang.

== Structure ==
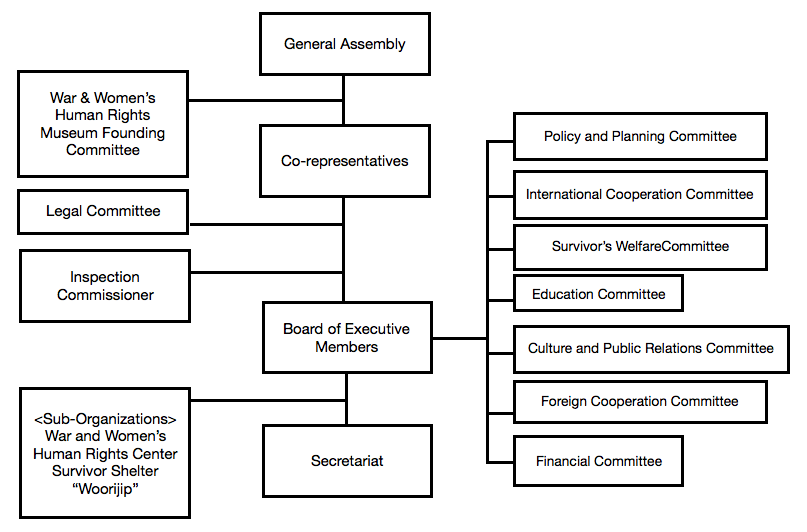

== Funding ==
The Korean Council is mostly funded by private donations. According to the council, this illustrates "the financial and sociopolitical difficulties of a social minority involved in contesting patriarchal states with feminist visions for a more just society."

Historically, the Korean Council conducted nationwide fund-raising campaigns in 1997 and 1998 while defying Asian National Peace Fund for Women, raised by private donations and criticized as an evasion of Japan's governmental responsibility for a valid compensation. As a result, each of the victims received 7,606,800 won, in addition to the government subsidies of 31,500,000 each.

== Objectives ==
Since its foundation, the Korean Council has demanded an admission, an apology, and compensation by the Japanese government for the sexual slavery of Korean women. The objectives are outlined in 7 principal objectives:

1. Acknowledge the war crime

2. Reveal the truth in its entirely about the crimes of military sexual slavery

3. Make an official apology

4. Make legal reparations

5. Punish those responsible for the war crime

6. Accurately record the crime in history textbooks

7. Erect a memorial for the victims of the military sexual slavery and establish a historical museum

"This is to restore the abused rights of the women : to stop wartime violence against women : to correct the distorted history between Korea and Japan : to prevent the reemerging of Japanese militarism : and to build peace in Asia and the world as a whole." - The Korean Council for the Women Drafted for Military Sexual Slavery by Japan

== Activities ==
=== Wednesday Demonstration ===
The Wednesday Demonstration was first held on January 8, 1992, in front of the Japanese Embassy in Korea. Since then, the Korean Council has been hosting the demonstration on every Wednesday at noon with other sympathizers and the survivors of the Japanese sexual slavery. The demonstration represents peace and human rights against war and gender-based violence. The victims have voiced to stop violence against women in the time of armed conflict and to revive justice and human rights. It also provides a forum for on-site education on the comfort women issue and a moment of solidarity under the cause of safeguarding justice. The Wednesday Demonstration marked its 1000th weekly protest on December 14, 2011.

=== Welfare Activities for the Survivors ===
The Korean Council provides counseling, medical support, outdoor visits, arrangements and counseling for funeral procedures, and weekly get-together dinner to help the former military sexual slaves mostly in their old age. In addition, the council is in charge of recruiting and training volunteers to help the survivors heal their trauma. A shelter called "our home" is operated by the council for the survivors.

=== Activities toward the Korean Government and the National Assembly ===
The Korean Council has pressured the Korean Government to take legislative action to protect the rights of comfort women. A thorough investigation on the crime against comfort women was conducted in 1992 under supervision of the Ministry of Foreign Affairs. "The Social Security Law for the Comfort Women of the Japanese Army During the Period of Japanese Colonial Rule" was passed in 1993, which guarantees each survivor priority in renting government housing, among other things. In 1997, "The New Immigration Law to Prohibit Japanese War Criminals from Entering Korea" was issued to forbid the entrance of war criminals to Korean. The Korean Council has been demanding the National Assembly to bring the issue of comfort women to international domain for a full apology and compensation from Japanese government.

=== International solidarity activities ===
The Korean Council has attempted to spread the issue of comfort women throughout the world. Since the Korean Council presented the issue to the UN Commission on Human Rights (UNCHR) in 1992, recommendations to the Japanese government to fulfill its legal responsibilities have been issued by international organizations such as UNCHR, the International Commission of Jurists, and the ILO Committee of Experts. The Korean Council also organizes an Asian Women's Solidarity Conference every year with other victimized Asian states. The 15th Conference in 2018 was held from March 7 to 9 in Seoul.

=== Education Center and the Campaigns ===
In order to recover the human rights of women that have been infringed on by war, the Korean Council opened "The Education Center of the Korean Council for Women Drafted for Military Sexual Slavery Japan" to educate future generations. In the education center, there is the Place of Repose which offers education and healthcare programs for the former comfort women, the Education Room which provides history and human rights, the Exhibition Room which exhibits the articles, historical photographs and photographs of ongoing human rights movements, and the Library which preserves and lends domestic and foreign documents, pictures, and films. In addition, there are various educational programs for students and teachers, civil organization activists, and domestic and foreign visitors which present testimonies of the former comfort women, video footage, and lectures on human rights of women with respect to the comfort women issue.

The Korean Council is promoting the 100 Million Signatures Campaign for the Resolution of the Japanese Military Sexual Slavery Issue.

=== War and Women's Human Rights Center ===
The Korean Council's War and Women's Human Rights Center was founded in 2001 to "stop violence against women in armed conflict regions that is happening around the world today by advancing the comfort women issue." The center is mainly used as a site for history education as well as for campaigns and exhibitions. To preserve the truth of the war crime and provide peace and human rights education, the Korean Council raised funds for a museum exhibiting and recording the council's movement. The museum was completed in 2012 after nine years of construction, and has been informing visitors through exhibitions and archival material. The story of the comfort women is displayed in video footage, personal audio testimonies, photographs, objects, written documentation, and panels. At the end of the exhibition, a tour guide discusses the ongoing movements of the survivors to resolve the issue.

=== Support for Comfort Women: A New Musical ===
The Korean Council for the Women Drafted for Military Sexual Slavery by Japan supports Comfort Women: A New Musical.

== Controversy ==
In May 2020, former comfort woman Lee Yong-soo, publicly accused Yoon Mee-hyang and the Korean Council of having exploited her and the other former comfort women for political and financial gain. Lee accused Yoon and the Korean Council of having exploited former comfort woman Kim Bok-dong by sending her to tour in the United States for fundraising, despite being her having been in poor health. Lee also announced that she would no longer be attending the weekly Wednesday demonstration, which draw large numbers of supporters, especially students. Lee said that the demonstrations taught the younger generations "hatred" in a time when Japan and South Korea should befriend one another to resolve their issues. However, Lee Yong-soo participated in the Wednesday demonstration again from March 2023.

The group has also been accused of having pressured the former comfort women into not accepting money from the Japanese government under a deal made in 2015, which was intended to resolve the issue.

== See also ==
- Comfort women
