= House of Sharing =

Nursing home for comfort women in South Korea

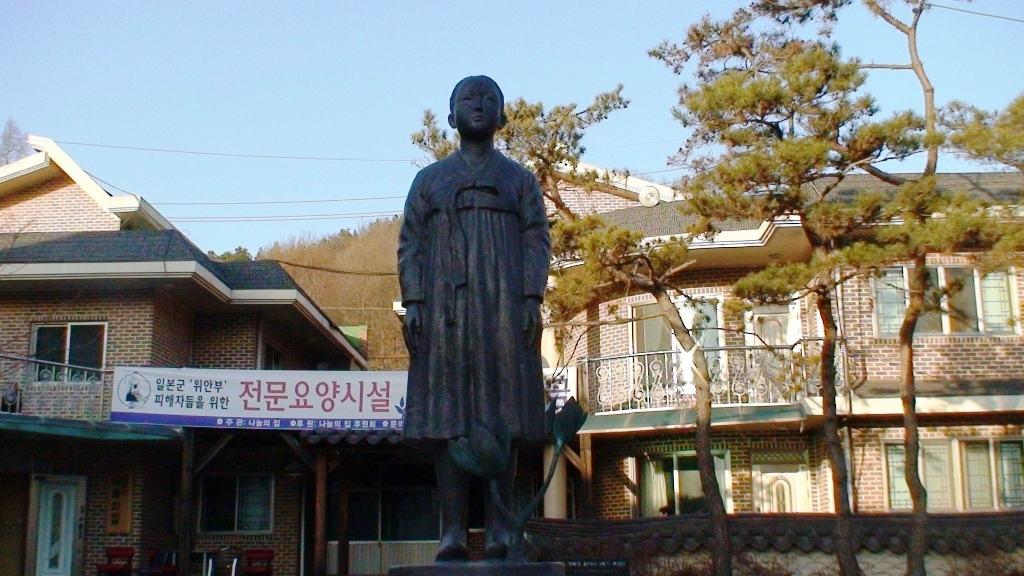
House of Sharing

The House of Sharing (Korean: 나눔의 집, Nanum-ui jib) is a nursing home for living comfort women in Seoul, South Korea. The House of Sharing was founded in June 1992 through funds raised by Buddhist organizations and various socio-civic groups. The original location was a dilapidated, more traditional Korean-style rental house in Hyehwa-dong in Seoul. With continued private funding and a notable donation of private land from prominent Buddhist businesswoman Cho Yong-ja, a spacious, modern compound was completed in December 1995. The 'comfort women' were relocated to the new building located in Gwangju, Gyeonggi, on the outskirts of Seoul, in February 1996. The House of Sharing includes “The Museum of Sexual Slavery by Japanese Military” to spread the truth about the Japanese military's brutal abuse of comfort women and to educate descendants and the public.

The House of Sharing offers art therapy programs for its residents. In 2017, a memorial and exhibition hall opened on the grounds of the House of Sharing. It includes a space to showcase the artwork surviving comfort women have made.

Survivors who live or have lived at the House of Sharing include Kang Duk-kyung, Kim Soon-duk, and Kim Bok-dong. The 'comfort women' who live at the House of Sharing are known for participating in the weekly protest, the Wednesday Demonstration.
