= Kim Bok-dong =

South Korean activist (1926–2019)

- Born: April 19, 1926; Yangsan, Korea
- Died: January 28, 2019 (aged 92); Seoul, South Korea
- Known for: Human rights activism

Korean name
- Hangul: 김복동
- RR: Gim Bokdong
- MR: Kim Poktong

Kim Bok-dong (Korean: 김복동; 19 April 1926 – 28 January 2019) was a human rights activist that campaigned against sexual slavery and war rape. She was a young woman who was put into sexual slavery by the Japanese Imperial Army; a military that recruited girls between the ages of 10 and 18 years of age from colonized and occupied countries from the 1930s until the end of World War II. From age 14, she was put into comfort stations for eight years across different countries in Asia. Her experiences led her to become an activist, and she advocated for the end of war-time sexual violence, anti-imperialism, workers' rights, and inter-Korean reconciliation. Along with the other "comfort women", she made the three-fold demand from the Japanese government: a formal state-level apology, reparations, and correction of Japanese history (including amending Japanese history textbooks to include the truth of the "comfort women" issue). In addition, Kim herself also supported other "comfort women" to step forward, and was a spokesperson in the "comfort women" movement. Kim died in Seoul, South Korea, in a hospital on January 28, 2019.

== Biography ==
Kim Bok-dong was born in Yangsan, Gyeongnam, Korea, Empire of Japan in March 1926. She was the fourth of six daughters. Her family was wealthy when she was young. However, later her family struggled economically and faced poverty. As a result, she had to end her education. Bok-dong's father died when she was eight years old. Her three older sisters married to escape the hard times, but Kim remained at home with her two younger sisters. Until age 14~15 in 1941, Kim and her mother were lied to by Japanese authorities; Kim was told that she was to support the war efforts by working in a military clothing factory and would return in three years. If not, her family would be considered traitors. The Japanese authorities did not take Kim away but demanded that her mother sign a document. Her mother could not read so she conceded to the demand, believing that her daughter would work in a factory in Japan. Instead, she was put into militarized sexual slavery in Japanese occupied territories for eight years, including Guangdong, Hong Kong, Singapore, Indonesia, and Malaysia. Kim Bok-dong had to have sex every day, especially from 8 a.m. to 5 p.m. on Sundays.

She attempted to commit suicide with two other girls by alcohol poisoning, but Japanese soldiers found them unconscious. The army took them to the hospital and medics revived them by pumping their stomachs. Ten days later, she woke up. She said if her father had been alive, she might not have been helplessly taken away. At age 21 and after the war, Kim returned to her hometown. She did not tell her family what happened to her, except to her mother. However, her mother became very distressed and died from a heart attack.

After the Korean War, she owned and operated a successful restaurant in Busan where her older sisters lived. Kim eventually met a man whom she fell in love with. Despite having this love, she suffered throughout her life because she was never able to have a child. She believes this was a result of the sexual abuse she endured. Along with this, her husband later died, not knowing her story. It was not until after he died that she began to speak about her experience.

== Activism ==
Kim stated, "Even as I returned to my homeland, it was never true liberation for me." After her husband died she began to speak out, and later joined another woman seeking official recognition as victims of Japanese sex slavery. In 1992, a year after Kim Hak-sun first broke the silence on the issue, Kim Bok-dong finally publicly began to share her experience and detail what happened to her during her time as a sex slave. This was also the year in which she began to participate in the weekly protest, the Wednesday Demonstration, in front of the Japanese Embassy. Then in 1993, Kim attended and testified at the "World Human Rights Conference" in Vienna, Austria. She had also testified during other events in Japan and the United States. Kim traveled around other parts of the world to tell her story and continued to participate in weekly protests. In an interview, Kim stated, "by presenting my testimony, I regain my sense of self and feel supported and connected with other women." Networking and connecting with other women allowed her to recognize that there are many people who suffered like she did and gave her a sense of community. She attended the Wednesday rallies to demand a formal apology from Japan and legal reparations from the Korean women who were forced into sexual slavery during the war. Kim acknowledged and recognized that she gained a platform where she was able to receive support from both ordinary people and the Korean Council for the Women Drafted for Military Sexual Slavery by Japan (KCWD). She emphasized to her supporters and the public at large that they should do the right thing not just for her but for those without a voice, who have gone through similar struggles she has faced as well as for the next generation.

=== The Butterfly Fund ===
Standing in solidarity with other ‘comfort women’ and wartime rape victims, Kim and Gil Won-ok established The Butterfly Fund, in an effort to help female victims of sexual violence in armed conflicts around the world. The symbolic meaning behind the name was stated by Kim: "We as activists would like the victims to be free from their hurtful past, like a butterfly that has just come out of its cocoon.". The fund was started with money from personal donations. In the early stages of the fund, Kim and Gil declared that they would donate all the money they received as reparations from the Japanese to other women as reparation to those who suffered from war just like they had. Eventually, the KCWD formally established the "Butterfly Fund" in order to accomplish Gil and Kim's objective. The fund began to provide support in the form of $500 per month to a victim support group in the Congo in July 2012. This amount would then be expanded once the Japanese government paid reparations. The first beneficiary of the fund was Rebecca Masika Katsuva. Kim stated, "It will fly high as [an] emancipatory butterfly to many women war victims with the name of the halmeon." The overarching idea behind the fund was to help and network with sexual violence victims in other countries, not only women in the same geographic region as the founders. For example, the fund has been used to aid Vietnamese women who were raped by Korean soldiers from 1964 to 1973 during the Vietnam War. Kim also highlighted that Korea too should make efforts to acknowledge war crimes committed by its own people.

=== Artwork ===
In addition to sharing her stories with the public verbally, Kim also created art to share with the public. In 1992, she began to live in the House of Sharing due to living a lonely life in Busan. During her time at the nursing home, she participated in an art therapy program. Her artwork told her history to future generations. Artwork from the House of Sharing was included in campaigns to raise awareness and educate the global public on the 'comfort women' issue. Her artistic themes included childhood memories, the experience of Japanese military slavery, and her present life and feelings. She worked in paint, woodblock print, and pencil. Her works included The Day a 14 year old Girl is Stolen Away (1998), As Youth Slips Away, and Suddenly I am Old and Grey (1998), Japan Do Not Trespass - Dok Island is Our Land (1998), and The Leaves of that Gaunt Tree will Blossom Someday (1998).
