= Wednesday demonstration =

Weekly protest in Seoul, South Korea

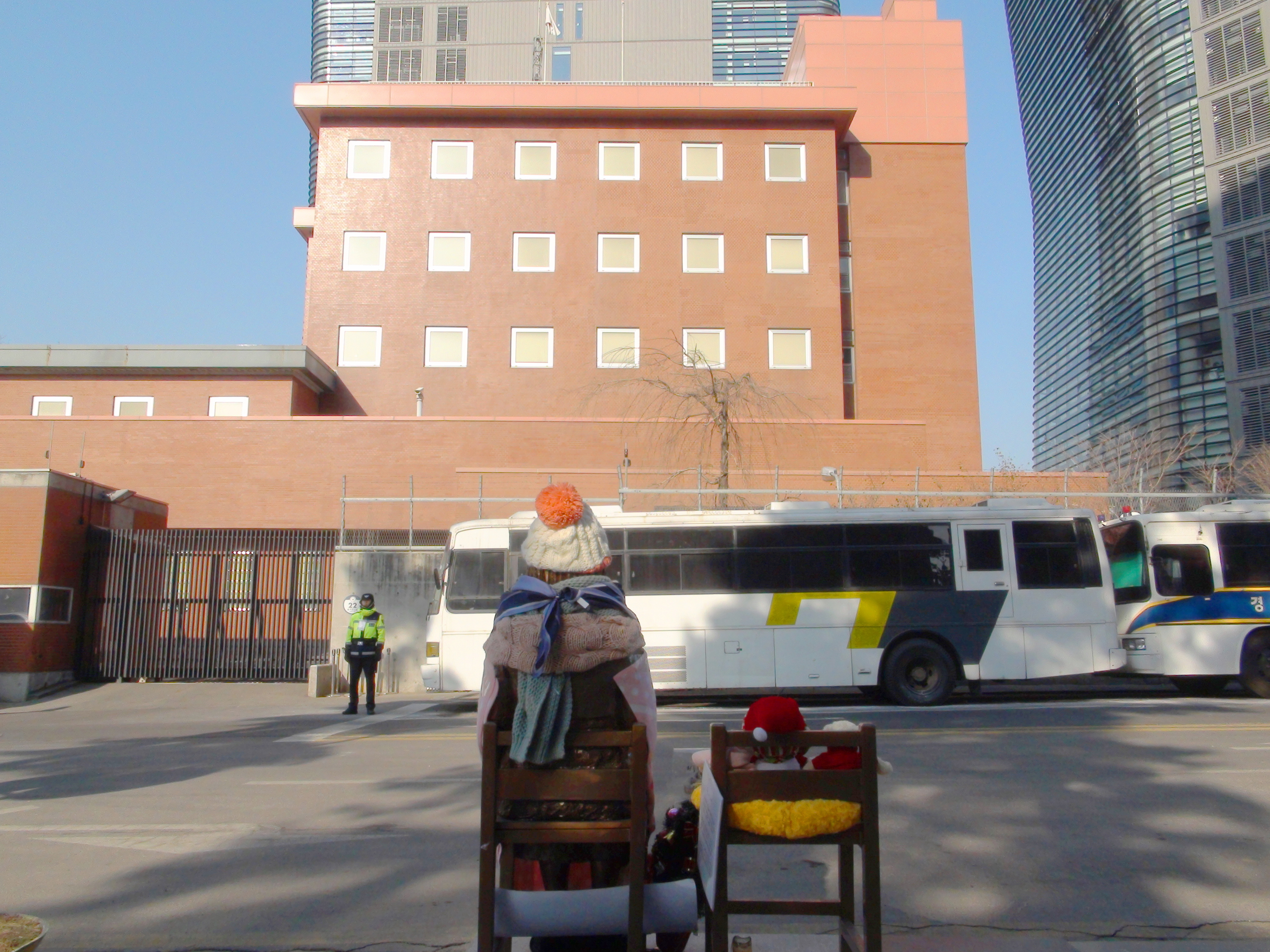
The bronze statue of a comfort woman in front of the Japanese Embassy, Seoul

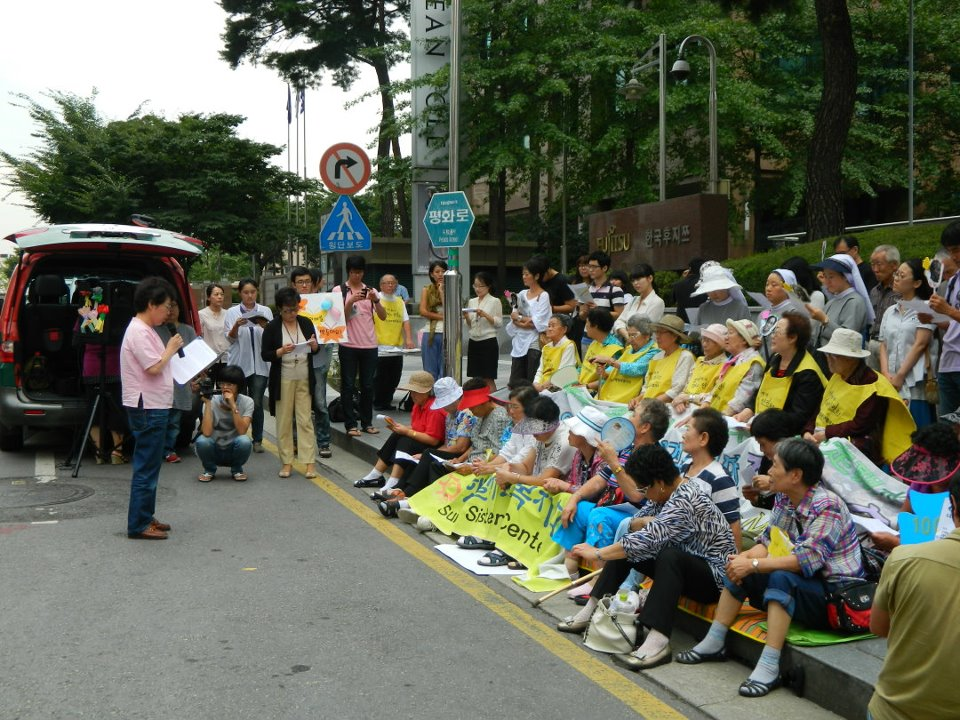
A comfort women rally in front of the Japanese Embassy in Seoul, August 2011

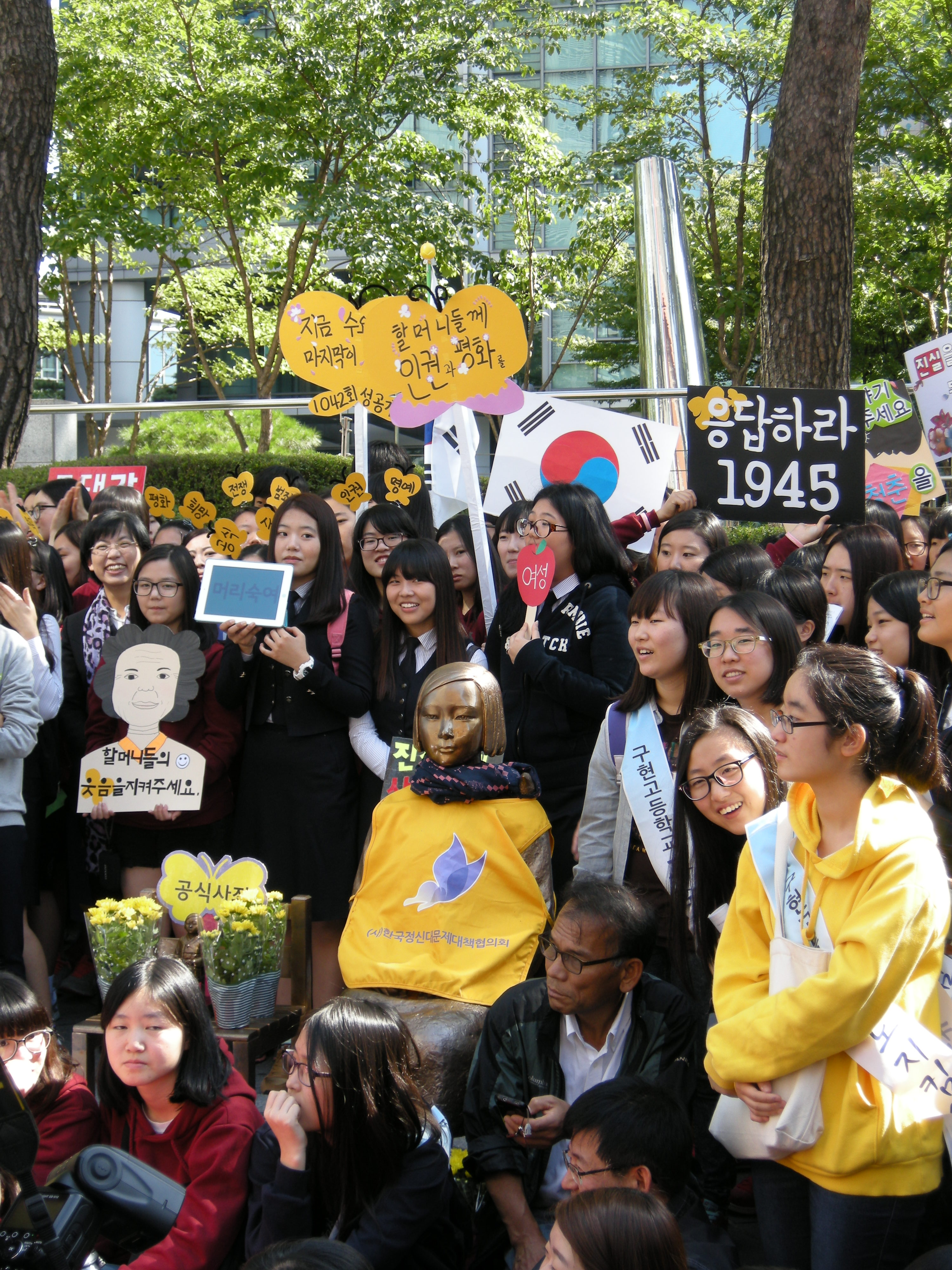
A comfort women rally in front of the Japanese Embassy in Seoul, October 2012

Wednesday demonstration (Korean: 수요 집회, romanized: Suyo jipoe), officially named Wednesday Demonstration demanding Japan to redress the Comfort Women problems (Korean: 일본군 위안부 문제 해결을 위한 정기 수요시위, romanized: ilbongun wianbu munje haegyeoreul wihan jeonggi suyosiwi), is a weekly protest in South Korea which aims at obtaining justice from the Japanese government regarding the large-scale sexual slavery system established under Imperial Japan rule during World War II (its victims are commonly known under the euphemism "comfort women"). The weekly protest is held in the presence of surviving comfort women on every Wednesday at noon in front of the Embassy of Japan in Seoul.

== Background ==
The weekly protest is led by The Korean Council for the Women Drafted for Military Sexual Slavery by Japan, commonly referred to as the Korean Council. The demonstrations take place at noon every Wednesday, the busiest time of the day. The first demonstration was held on January 8, 1992, for the visit of then Prime Minister of Japan Kiichi Miyazawa, and the 1,000th on December 14, 2011. The only Wednesday protest the Korean Council and former comfort women have missed since 1992 was during the Kobe earthquake in Japan in 1995. The Wednesday demonstration was listed in March 2002 in the Guinness Book of Records as the world's oldest rally on a single theme. Such long years of weekly protests are still ongoing as they believe the Japanese government has not given any sincere official apology to these victims. In 2007, the Prime minister of Japan, Shinzo Abe, mentioned how there was no "forceful" action of the Japanese government in gathering the women, which was still his stance regarding this issue until his death in 2022. In December 2015, there was a deal signed by the government of President Park Geun-hye, incumbent Moon Jae-in's predecessor, and Prime minister Shinzo Abe regarding the comfort women issue, but the protest still went on as the deal was regarded as a lacking deal without the consent of the victims and forced by the Park's government's favor. Such stance has been supported by the new foreign minister of South Korea, Kang Kyung-wha who pinpointed how the two countries are at odds regarding the deal struck in 2015. However, the deal was officially cancelled by the government of President Moon Jae-in in November 2018. August 14, 2019, marked the 1,400th Wednesday Demonstration, the day before the 74th National Liberation Day wherein thousands of people gathered in support of the movement.

Korean law prohibits demonstrations around foreign embassies. It is believed that the local government has intentionally left it alone. This statement regarding prohibition around foreign embassies have an issue. Article 11 Clause 4 of the Assembly and Demonstration Act of South Korea restricts the protests within 100 meters from the foreign embassies. Nonetheless, there are three exceptions. One is the case that the protest is not regarding the diplomatic institution nor residence of diplomats. Another is when the demonstration is expected not to become a large scale. The third is that the demonstration is held on holidays. And the demonstration shall not threaten the safety of the diplomatic institution nor its members for all three exceptions. The Wednesday protest falls in the second case. It always keeps its location on the other side of Japanese embassy without occupying the motorway or opposite side, which is deemed to be small size or medium even at largest. In addition, the Japanese embassy moved to a building next to where it used to be, further away from the demonstration spot, in 2015. Thus, the location of the protest at present since 2015 is more accurately across the street from former Japanese embassy.

== Objectives ==
According to the Korean Council, the "Wednesday Demonstrations have turned into a place for solidarity between citizens and the victims, a living site for history education, a platform for peace and women's human rights, bringing people together in solidarity beyond gender, age, borders, and ideologies." The Korean Council states that they will keep protesting until Korea has considered the rights and dignity fully restored to the victims.

Their objective in protesting is "the restoration of dignity and human rights of comfort women." The Korean Council's overall objectives in fully resolving the war crimes are:

1. Acknowledge the war crime.
2. Reveal the truth in its entirety about the crimes of military sexual slavery.
3. Make an official apology by the Japanese Government.
4. Make legal reparations.
5. Punish those responsible for the war crime.
6. Accurately record the crime in history textbooks.
7. Erect a memorial for the victims of military sexual slavery and establish a historical museum.

Recently, the Korean government claims to have a fair negotiation with the Japanese government which implements the voice of the victims of sexual slavery which is seen as an improvement from the former agreement. The 2015 settlement that was reached by President Park Geun-hye's ministry was thrown out by president Moon Jae-in. On November 21, 2018, however, the Japanese-funded comfort women foundation which was launched in July 2016 to finance the controversial negotiated settlement was shut down by President Moon Jae-in ministry after the 2015 agreement was scrapped.

On August 14, 2018, the first official memorial day of comfort women was marked in South Korea.

== Pyeonghwaui Sonyeosang ==
The golden bronze statue, "Pyeonghwaui Sonyeosang" often referred to as ("Statue of Peace") (Korean: 평화의 소녀상), located in Seoul, South Korea, was inaugurated for the 1,000th rally on December 14, 2011. The statue of the Korean girl sitting on a chair facing the former Japanese Embassy represents all of the Korean girls forced into sexual slavery by the Imperial Japanese Army. The bird on her shoulder is symbolic of freedom and peace. The original statue in Seoul has inspired at least a dozen subsequent statues commemorating comfort women including statues in Busan and San Francisco. Nearly all of the statues have been protested or condemned by members of the Japanese government officials and delegates. Repeatedly, Japan has asked for the removal of the "comfort women" statues in Seoul and Busan.

== Controversy ==
In May 2020, Lee Yong-soo, a prominent former comfort woman and activist, along with other elderly victims declared that they will no longer be participating in regular Wednesday demonstrations, after a former leader of the Korean Council, the group organizing the rally, was accused of misusing funds meant for victims. Lee Yong-soo claimed that the protests had only engendered hatred between young South Korean and Japanese people and that the group created to support her and other survivors had exploited public sympathy for their suffering to obtain donations, but had spent little of their funds on the women's welfare. However, Lee Yong-soo participated in the Wednesday demonstration again from March 2023.

== In media ==
Activist Meehyang Yoon's book on comfort women and the Wednesday demonstrations, 20 Years of Wednesdays: The Unshakable Hope of the Halmoni – Former Japanese Military Comfort Women (20년간의 수요일 : 일본군 '위안부' 할머니들이 외치는 당당한 희망), was published in 2010 in Korean, and translated into Japanese the following year. A follow-up, 25 Years of Wednesdays (25 년간의 수요일), was published in 2016.

== See also ==
- Feminism in South Korea
- House of Sharing
- Japan-Korea disputes
- Japanese war crimes
