= Kim Hak-sun =

South Korean activist (1924–1997)

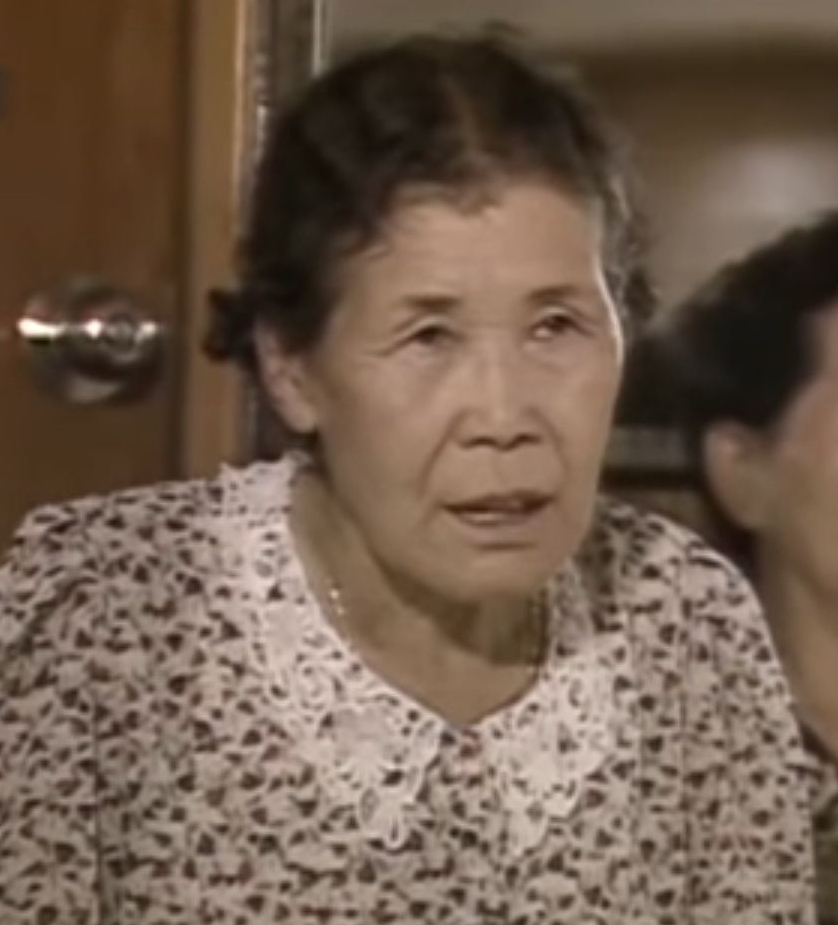
- Born: 20 October 1924; Jilin, China
- Died: 16 December 1997 (aged 73)

Korean name
- Hangul: 김학순
- Hanja: 金學順
- RR: Gim Haksun
- MR: Kim Haksun

Kim Hak-sun (October 20, 1924 – December 16, 1997) was a Korean human rights activist who campaigned against sex slavery and wartime sexual violence. Kim was one of the victims who had been forced into sexual slavery by the Japanese Imperial Army between the early 1930s up until the end of the Pacific War. She is the first woman in Korea to come forward publicly and testify her experience as a comfort woman for the Japanese military. Her testimony was made on 14 August 1991. In December 1991, she filed a class-action lawsuit against the Japanese government for the damages inflicted during the war. She was the first of what would become hundreds of women from Korea, China, Taiwan, the Philippines, Indonesia, and the Netherlands who came forward to tell their stories of their enslavement to the Imperial Japanese military. She was inspired to finally take her story public after 40 years of silence by the growth of the women's rights movement in South Korea. Kim died in 1997 and her court case was still ongoing.

== Background ==
=== Early years ===
Kim Hak-sun was born in 1924 in Jilin, China. Her parents had originally resided in Pyongyang, however they had to move to China because of oppression by Japan. Kim's biological father was a Korean independence activist who had spent his days and nights supporting the independence army. She returned to Pyongyang with her mother after the death of her father, who died when she was only three months old. While living in Pyongyang, Kim attended a missionary school where she held fond memories of "lessons, sports, and playing with my friends." At the age of 14, her mother remarried. She had a difficult time becoming accustomed to her stepfather and eventually rebelled, causing her mother to send her to live with a foster family who trained kisaeng. She attended the academy for two years where she learned many forms of entertainment, including the art of dance, song, and pansori, among other things. She graduated at the age of 17 and was thus unable to obtain a license to work as a kisaeng, which required a minimum age of 19.

=== Japanese military sexual slavery ===
Kim's foster father took her with another adopted daughter to China to sell them. Kim's travel with her foster father eventually brought her to Beijing. Upon their arrival, they were approached by a Japanese soldier who took her foster father aside, suspecting him to be a spy. Hak-sun was subsequently abducted by other Japanese soldiers and was taken to a comfort station where she was forced to work as a comfort woman along with four other Korean women. During her stay, she was given the Japanese name, Aiko. After four months had passed, Hak-sun managed to escape the comfort station she was being held at with the help of a Korean man who later became her husband and the father of her two children.

There are some conflicting stories that Kim's foster father attempted to sell Kim to the owner of the comfort station, and her husband had tried to rape her before helping her escape.

=== After the escape ===
Shortly after the liberation of Korea in 1945, Hak-sun and her family returned to Korea. She lived in a refugee camp in Seoul for three months, where her daughter died from cholera. Some time after 1953, her husband died due to wounds incurred when the roof of a building he had been working in collapsed on top of him. Upon recalling the death of her husband, Hak-sun said: "I had suffered so much, living with this man who had supposedly been my husband. When he was drunk and aggressive, because he knew that I had been a comfort woman, he would insult me with words that had cut me to the heart (...) He had tortured me mentally so much that I did not miss him a lot.” Her son died of a heart attack while swimming at sea.

== Kim's testimonials ==
=== First testimony ===
For over four decades after the war ended, few heard about the comfort women. This was due in part because many women died in the comfort stations, many committed suicide after the war, or did not feel comfortable sharing their experience because rape was too sensitive of a topic in Korean culture. In 1990, the Japanese government announced that Japan was not responsible for the issue of military's comfort women, denying the fact that they forcibly took advantage of young women from numerous countries as sex slaves and the existence of comfort stations. However, in the late 1980s, Korea had become a more democratic state and difficult topics like rape were more openly discussed. Kim could disclose the truth of Japanese military's comfort station and disastrous life of the victims. On 14 August 1991, Kim described: "I do not understand why Japan is lying. I made my determination after watching the news. I was not asked to do it. I am doing this out of my own will. I am almost 70 years old, and I am not afraid of anything. I will say what I have to say."

Kim was 67 years old when she made the first testimony in 1991. She was coercively taken to Japanese military's comfort station which was located in China at the age of 17 by a Japanese military officer. "I tried to escape, but I was caught soon and raped in tears. I was seventeen then." When she resisted, the officer responded by kicking her and threatening her by saying that she would be killed if she did not obey him. She was then brutally raped. Together with other 4 young Korean women, she had to be a "hygienic tool used by Japanese soldiers to satisfy their sexual desire." In the comfort station, the victims aged between 17 and 22 had to deal with about 7 to 8 Japanese soldiers a day in small rooms that were separated from one another by cloth. They sustained their lives with rice which was brought to them from the military unit. They wore whichever clothes that were available to them and had to undergo "sanitary inspections" once a week.

Kim was able to escape from the comfort station after three months with the help of a merchant from Korea. She married him and gave birth to two children. The family came back to Korea after liberation. However, she lost all of them due to accidents and diseases and had lived by herself.

She condemned Korean people who had been "clinging to Japan" while there was painful history they should remember. She stressed that people must be aware of the seriousness of the "comfort women" problem.

=== After the testimony ===
Encouraged by Kim's testimony, other victims of Japanese military sexual slavery declared themselves as comfort women and began to share their ordeal. Kim's testimony was the starting point that the issue of comfort women had come to light in the world. There were about 200 victims in South Korea and a lot more in other countries such as Philippines, Singapore, and North Korea.

On 6 December 1991, Kim and two other victims filed a lawsuit at Tokyo District Court requiring reparation and apology from the Japanese government ("Case on the Claim for Reparations for Korean Victim in the Pacific War"). The plaintiff delegates also included "13 former soldiers and civilians who were attached to Japanese military, 1 prison guard, 3 widows, and 15 survivors." In the complaint, they claimed that both Japanese government and military were responsible for operation of comfort stations and damage inflicted on the victims, and also they ignored their "mental and physical suffering."

She revealed her suffering in the comfort station in the book of collection of victims' testimonies, Korean Comfort Women Who Were Taken Away by Force. She actively participated in rallies and protests which were held in front of the Embassy of Japan in Korea.

In 1995, the Asian Women's Fund was established in Japan to provide compensation through private funding for the victims. The Japanese government was criticized that it did not recognize and admit the crime and compensate the victims properly. The monetary compensation by private organization was viewed as a means for the government to avoid to fulfill its duty. Oga Mayako, one of the leaders of Asian Solidarity Conference, condemned that Japanese government's "pushing" of Asian Women's Fund was the act of "avoiding legal responsibility" for the crime of sex slavery, and it was "the policy of deception." Kim and other victims raised their voices to refuse to get the money and demanded Japan atone and legally compensate them. Also, 191 Korean congressmen issued a public statement requiring Japan to admit that sex slavery had been an inhumane war crime, initiate the duty to punish the criminal, and provide legal restitution, and repeal the Asian Women's Fund which blurred the nature of the problem.

Kim rejected the money. She felt distraught and even regretted making the testimony. "I did not come out with my shameful past because of money. What I strongly demand is restitution, not some money for consolation. I live in an apartment provided by the government, and I receive 250 thousand won of support fund monthly. I do not need money." She was dedicated to sacrifice herself for the comfort women. She claimed to record the fact that Japan had not apologized and compensated on history books.

=== Last interview ===
In 1997, Kim delivered her steadfast opinion about the issue of comfort women during the interview. She was infuriated thinking about the inhumane environment she was forced to be situated in. In the comfort station, she saw many fellow women killed by Japanese soldiers, and she had to live in fear. She had managed to escape the comfort station alive, but many other victims were murdered. After returning to Korea, she had lived her whole life grieving. Although she was victimized and traumatized, the feeling of disgrace was what first overwhelmed her because she could not live a normal life like others did. Rather than being supported, the victims of Japanese sex slavery were scorned and viewed as vulgar, even in their own countries. She could not do anything but spend her days and nights mourning for her ruined youth. She expressed her enragement at Japan's private fund. "What do we get consoled for? That is not right. Uski Geiko, one of the leaders of women's organizations said they would give us about 2 million yen. This is not fair. Japan must atone. My wish is simple: to hear Japan saying sorry. That is what I desperately want."

== Book ==
The story of Kim's life as a Korean comfort woman was published in the book The Korean Comfort Women Who Were Coercively Dragged Away for the Military, published in Korea in 1993. The book was edited by the Korean Council for Women Drafted for Military Sexual Slavery by Japan, and includes the stories of 18 other women who were also forced to be comfort women. Her chapter of the book was translated into English and published in the book True Stories of the Korean Comfort Women.

In 1995, she appeared in a stage play entitled Disappeared in Twilight about the life of comfort women.

== See also ==
- Comfort women
- Wednesday Demonstration
