= SJE =

SJE may refer to:

- Arjeplog Sámi or Pite Sámi (the ISO 639-3 code for this Sámi language)
- Foundation of Japanese Honorary Debts (Stichting Japanse Ereschulden), an interest group for Dutch victims of Japanese captivity during World War II
- San Jose Earthquakes, a soccer team
- Shorter Jewish Encyclopedia
- South Jersey Energy, USA
- State Judicial Exam, China

== See also ==
- Sje, a Cyrillic letter
- Komi Sje, a Cyrillic letter
