= Yoshiaki Yoshimi =

Japanese historian (born 1946)

Yoshiaki Yoshimi (吉見 義明, Yoshimi Yoshiaki; born 1946) is a professor of Japanese modern history at Chuo University in Tokyo, Japan. He is a founding member of the Center for Research and Documentation on Japan's War Responsibility.

He was born in Yamaguchi Prefecture, and studied at the University of Tokyo.

== Notable research ==
Yoshimi has done major research on war crimes perpetrated by the Imperial Japanese Army and the Imperial Japanese Navy during the first part of the Shōwa period. He has published his studies on the use of chemical weapons by Japan, ordered by Michinomiya Hirohito himself.

Yoshimi is mostly noted for his work on sex slaves. He found the first documented evidence at the "Defense Agency Library" of Tokyo that the Imperial Japanese Army established and ran "comfort stations." He discovered plenty of documentation and testimony to prove the existence of approximately 2,000 comfort women centers where as many as 200,000 Korean, Filipina, Taiwanese, Indonesian, Burmese, Dutch, Australian, and Japanese women, many of whom were teenagers and some as young as fourteen, were detained and forced to perform sexual activities with Japanese troops. One piece was a notice written on 4 March 1938 by the adjutants to the Chiefs of Staff of the North China Army and Central China Expeditionary Army titled "Concerning the Recruitment of Women for Military Comfort Stations." According to that document:

"Many agents should have required special attention. Some of them accentuated the name of the armies as much as they might hurt the credibility of the armies and cause misunderstanding among the public, others recruited women without control through war correspondents or entertainers, and others selected the wrong agents who took a kidnapping approach to recruit women so that the police arrested them. In the future, the armies in the field should control recruiting and select the agencies circumspectly and properly, and should build up a closer connection with the local police and the local military police in the implementation of recruiting. Take special care not to have problems which have the potential to damage the armies' credibility or are not acceptable to social standards."

The publication of these documents led to admission statements by the Chiefs of the Cabinet: Secretary Koichi Kato on 12 January 1993 and Yōhei Kōno on 4 August 1993. The Kono statement has been especially important in the comfort women issue. He accused former Prime Minister Shinzo Abe's of denying facts when the former leader denied the military's involvement of comfort women.

In July 2004, Yoshimi and historian Yuki Tanaka proclaimed the discovery of documents at National Archives of Australia that demonstrated that cyanide gas was tested on Australian and Dutch prisoners in November 1944 on the Kai Islands.

On 17 April 2007, Yoshimi and fellow historian Hirofumi Hayashi told a news conference that they had discovered documents at the archives of the Tokyo Tribunal that demonstrate that Tokkeitai members coerced or otherwise forced women from Indonesia, Indochina, and China into sexual slavery.

== Selected publications ==
- Dokugasusen to Nihongun, Iwanami Shoten, 2004, ISBN 4-00-024128-1
- Yoshimi, Y.; O'Brien, S. (2000). Comfort Women: Sexual Slavery in the Japanese Military During World War II. Asia Perspectives: History, Society, and Culture Series. Columbia University Press. ISBN 978-0-231-12033-3.
- Yoshimi and Seiya Matsuno, Dokugasusen Kankei Shiryō II (Materials on poison gas Warfare), Kaisetsu, Hōkan 2, Jūgonen sensô gokuhi shiryōshū, Funi Shuppankan, 1997
- Yoshimi and Kentarō Awaya, Dokugasusen Kankei Shiryō, Jūgonen sensō gokuhi shiryōshū, 18, Fuji Shuppan, 1989
- Yoshimi, Y. (2015). Grassroots Fascism: The War Experience of the Japanese People (E. Mark, Trans.). Columbia University Press. (Original work published 1987)

== See also ==
- Comfort women
- Japanese war crimes
- Prostitutes in South Korea for the U.S. military
