= Comfort women =

WWII-era forced prostitutes for Japan

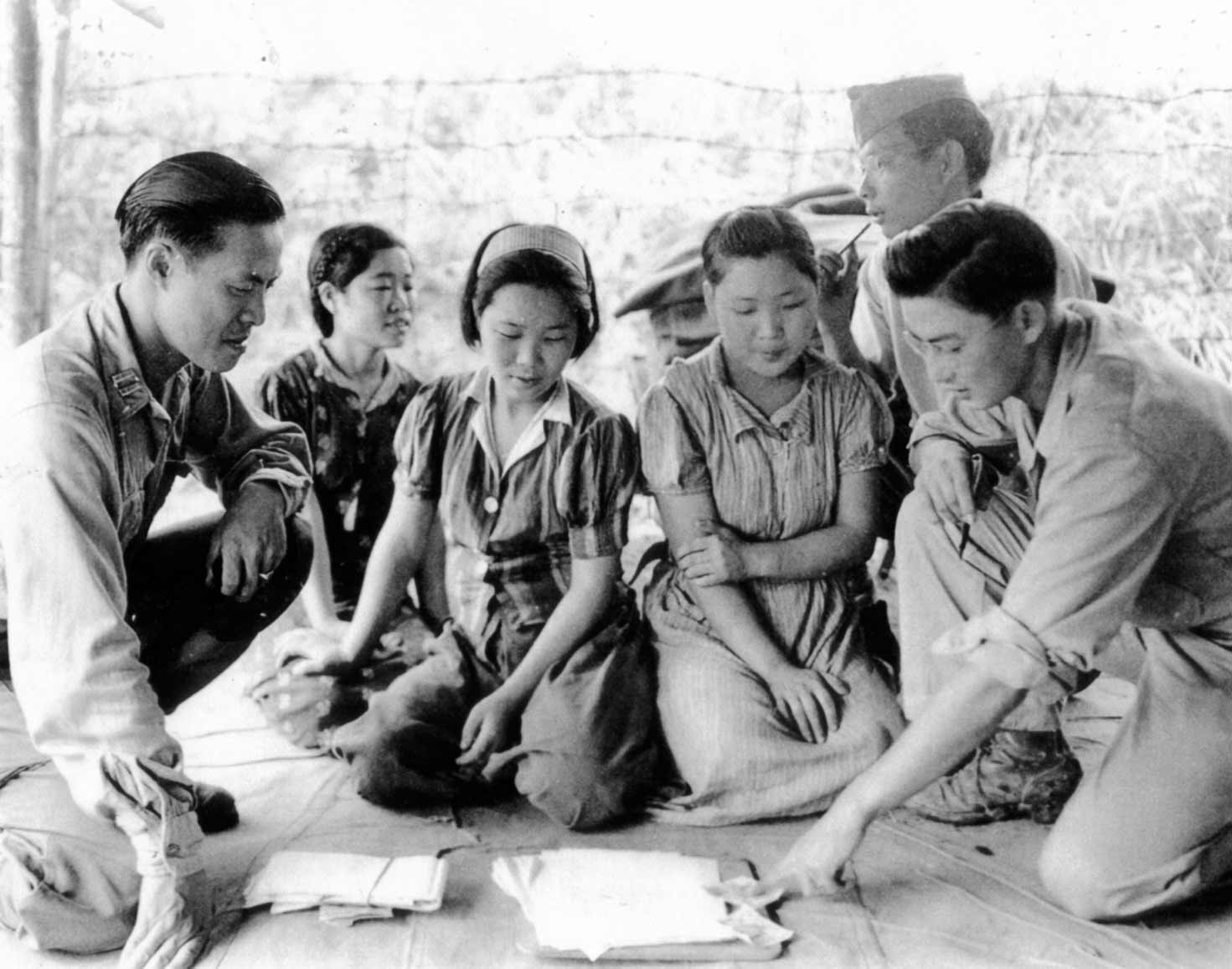
- Korean comfort women being questioned by the United States Army after the Siege of Myitkyina, August 14, 1944
- Native name: Japanese: 慰安婦, ianfu
- Location: Asia-Pacific
- Date: 1932–1945
- Attack type: Sexual slavery, enforced prostitution, wartime rape
- Perpetrator: Imperial Japanese Armed Forces

Comfort women were women and girls forced into sexual slavery by the Imperial Japanese Armed Forces in occupied countries and territories before and during World War II. The term comfort women is a translation of the Japanese ianfu (慰安婦), a euphemism that literally means "comforting, consoling woman".

Japanese troops forced tens or even hundreds of thousands of women into sexual enslavement, mostly from Korea but also from Australia, Burma, China, the Netherlands, the Philippines, Japan, Indonesia, East Timor, New Guinea and other countries. Many women died due to brutal mistreatment; far more sustained physical and emotional distress. After the war, Japan denied the existence of comfort women, refusing to provide an apology or appropriate restitution. After numerous demands for an apology and the revelation of official records showing the Japanese government's culpability, the Japanese government began to offer an official apology and compensation in the 1990s. However, apologies have been criticized as insincere by victims, advocacy groups, and scholars. Many Japanese government officials have continued to either deny or minimize the existence of comfort women. The Japanese government admits that girls and women suffered, but denies evidence that they were taken against their will during wartime.

Estimates vary about the number of women, with most historians settling somewhere in the range of 20,000–200,000; the exact numbers are still being researched and debated reflecting differences in archival evidence and postwar documentation.

The brothels were originally established with the stated intent of providing soldiers with a controlled sexual outlet to reduce wartime rape and the spread of venereal diseases. However, the comfort stations failed to achieve the stated goals. The first victims were Japanese women, some of whom were recruited by conventional means, and others who were recruited through deception or kidnapping. The military later expanded recruitment to women in Japanese colonies, citing factors such as a shortage of Japanese volunteers and concerns about maintaining Japan’s international image. In many cases, women were lured by false job openings for nurses and factory workers. Others were also lured by the promises of equity and sponsorship for higher education. A significant percentage of comfort women were minors.

== Outline of the comfort women system ==
=== Establishment by Japanese military ===
Given that prostitution in Japan was pervasive and organized, it was logical to find military prostitution in the Japanese armed forces. Military correspondence within the Imperial Japanese Army shows that the aims for facilitating comfort stations were to reduce or prevent rape by Japanese army personnel in an effort to prevent a worsening of anti-Japanese sentiment, to reduce venereal diseases among Japanese troops, and to prevent leakage of military secrets by civilians who were in contact with Japanese officers. Carmen Argibay, a former member of the Argentine Supreme Court of Justice, states that the Japanese government aimed to prevent atrocities like the Rape of Nanjing by confining rape and sexual abuse to military-controlled facilities, or stop incidents from leaking to the international press should they occur. She also states that the government wanted to minimize medical expenses on treating venereal diseases that the soldiers acquired from frequent and widespread rape, which hindered Japan's military capacity. Comfort women lived in sordid conditions, and were called "public toilets" by the Japanese. Yuki Tanaka states that local brothels outside of the military's reach had issues of security, since there were possibilities of spies disguised as workers of such private facilities. Japanese historian Yoshiaki Yoshimi further states that the Japanese military used comfort women to satisfy disgruntled soldiers during World War II and prevent military revolt. He said that, despite the goal of reducing rape and venereal disease, the comfort stations did the opposite—aggravating rape and increasing the spread of venereal disease. Comfort women stations were so prevalent that the Imperial Army offered accountancy classes on how to manage comfort stations, which included how to determine the actuarial "durability or perishability of the women procured".

==== Outline ====
In the Russo-Japanese War of 1904–1905, Japan's military closely regulated privately operated brothels in Manchuria.

Comfort houses were first established in Shanghai after the Shanghai incident in 1932 as a response to wholesale rape of Chinese women by Japanese soldiers. Yasuji Okamura, the chief of staff in Shanghai, ordered the construction of comfort houses to prevent further rape. After the rapes of many Chinese women by Japanese troops during the Nanjing Massacre in 1937, the Japanese forces adopted the general policy of creating comfort stations in various places in Japanese occupied Chinese territory, "not because of their concern for the Chinese victims of rape by Japanese soldiers but because of their fear of creating antagonism among the Chinese civilians". To staff the establishments, Japanese prostitutes were imported from Japan. Japanese women were the first victims to be enslaved in military brothels and trafficked across Japan, Okinawa, Japan's colonies and occupied territories, and overseas battlegrounds. According to Yoshiaki Yoshimi, comfort stations were established to avoid criticism from China, the United States of America and Europe following the case of massive rapes between battles in Shanghai and Nanjing.

As Japan continued military expansion, the military found itself short of Japanese volunteers, and turned to local populations—abducting and coercing women into serving as sex slaves in the comfort stations. Many women responded to calls to work as factory workers or nurses, and did not know that they were being pressed into sexual slavery. The Japanese Army often required local collaborationist governments to supply women to be sex slaves.

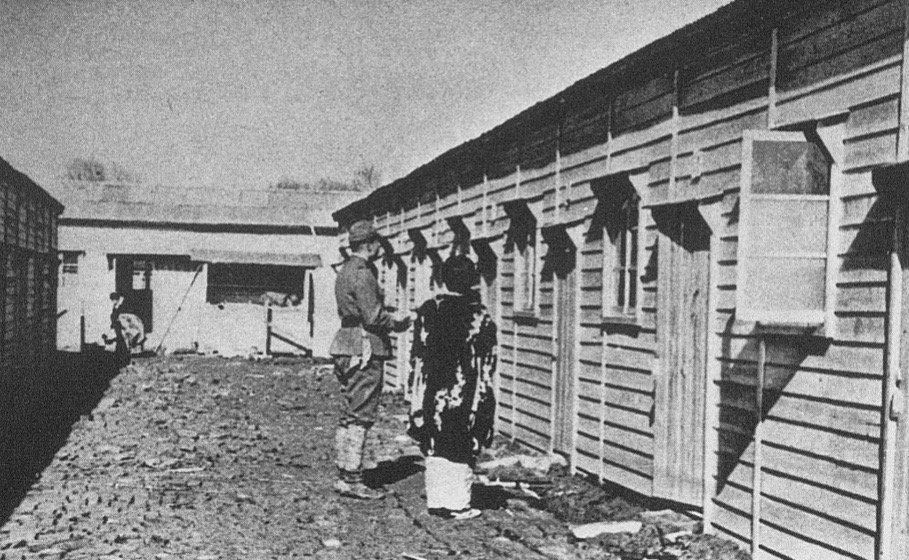
A Japanese military comfort station in China, photographed on February 7, 1938

In the early stages of World War II, Japanese authorities recruited prostitutes through conventional means. In urban areas, conventional advertising through middlemen was used alongside kidnapping. Kim and Cho(2023) note that comfort agents were exempted from legal constraints concerning human trafficking, kidnapping, and illegal recruitment without brokerage permits.

Middlemen advertised in newspapers circulating in Japan and in the Japanese colonies of Korea, Taiwan, Manchukuo, and China. These sources soon dried up, especially in metropolitan Japan. The Ministry of Foreign Affairs resisted further issuance of travel visas for Japanese prostitutes, feeling it tarnished the image of the Japanese Empire. The military turned to acquiring comfort women outside mainland Japan, mostly from Korea and from occupied China. An existing system of licensed prostitution within Korea made it easy for Japan to recruit women in large numbers.

Many women were tricked or defrauded into joining the military brothels. Based on false characterizations and payments—by Japanese or by local recruitment agents—which could help relieve family debts, many Korean girls enlisted to take the job. Furthermore, the South East Asia Translation and Interrogation Center (SEATIC) Psychological Warfare Interrogation Bulletin No.2 states that a Japanese facility manager purchased Korean women for 300 to 1000 yen depending on their physical characteristics, who then became his property and were not released even after completing the servitude terms specified in the contract. In northern Hebei province of China, Hui Muslim girls were recruited to "Huimin Girls' school" to be trained as entertainers, but then forced to serve as sex slaves. The American historian Gerhard Weinberg wrote that a major issue was that no historian had examined whether the soldiers of the Indian National Army used comfort women, since there had been no investigation for it. Lebra wrote "None of those who have written on Bose's Indian national army has investigated whether, while they were trained by the Japanese army, they were permitted to share in the 'comfort' provided by thousands of kidnapped Korean young women held as sex slaves by the Imperial Japanese Army at its camps. This might have provided them with some insight into the nature of Japanese, as opposed to British, colonial rule, as well what might be in store for their sisters and daughters."

Under the strain of the war effort, the military became unable to provide enough supplies to Japanese units; in response, the units made up the difference by demanding or looting supplies from the locals. The military often directly demanded that local leaders procure women for the brothels along the front lines, especially in the countryside where middlemen were rare. When the locals were considered hostile in China, Japanese soldiers carried out the "Three Alls policy" ("kill all, burn all, loot all") which included indiscriminately kidnapping and raping local civilians.

Chen Lifei, Su Zhiliang and Qiu Peipei trace the predecessor of the comfort women system to the brothels of ethnic Japanese prostitutes in Shanghai in the Qing dynasty during the 1880s, with 800 Japanese prostitutes in Shanghai in 1882, and the civilian owned Japanese brothels of Shanghai were not closed until June 1929, and replaced with Japanese barmaids and then the first Japanesen navy owned comfort stations were established with Japanese prostitutes in 1932 after the January 28 incident.

==== Later archives ====
The Tokyo war crimes trials did not address the enslavement of women for sex by the Japanese army, given that rape was not viewed as a war crime. On April 17, 2007, Yoshiaki Yoshimi and Hirofumi Hayashi announced the discovery of seven official documents in the archives of the Tokyo Trials, suggesting that Imperial military forces – such as the Tokkeitai (Naval military police) – forced women whose fathers attacked the Kenpeitai (Japanese Army military police) to work in front-line brothels in China, Indochina, and Indonesia. These documents were initially made public at the war crimes trial. In one of these, a lieutenant is quoted as confessing to having organized a brothel and having used it himself. Another source refers to Tokkeitai members having arrested women on the streets and putting them in brothels after enforced medical examinations.

On May 12, 2007, journalist Taichiro Kajimura announced the discovery of 30 Dutch government documents submitted to the Tokyo tribunal as evidence of a forced mass prostitution incident in 1944 in Magelang.

The South Korean government designated Bae Jeong-ja as a pro-Japanese collaborator (chinilpa) in September 2007 for recruiting comfort women.

In 2014, China produced almost 90 documents from the archives of the Kwantung Army on the issue. According to China, the documents provide ironclad proof that the Japanese military forced Asian women to work in front-line brothels before and during World War II.

In June 2014, more official documents were made public from the government of Japan's archives, documenting sexual violence and women forced into sexual slavery, committed by Imperial Japanese soldiers in French Indochina and Indonesia.

A 2015 study examined archival data which was previously difficult to access, partly due to the China–Japan Joint Communiqué of 1972 in which the Chinese government agreed not to seek any restitution for wartime crimes and incidents. New documents discovered in China shed light on facilities inside comfort stations operated within a Japanese army compound, and the conditions of the Korean comfort women. Documents were discovered verifying the Japanese Army as the funding agency for purchasing some comfort women.

Su Zhiliang, a Chinese professor at Shanghai Normal University, examined the Japanese Kwantung Army's records in Manchuria (now Northeast China), which are housed at the Jilin Archives in China. The operations of the Japanese Military Police, who were in charge of overseeing the "comfort stations" in various parts of China and Java, were the subject of these records. Su concluded that the sources revealed that comfort women stations were ordered, supported, and managed by the Japanese military authorities.

Documents were found in Shanghai that showed details of how the Japanese Army went about opening comfort stations for Japanese troops in occupied Shanghai. Documents included the Tianjin Municipal Archives from the archival files of the Japanese government and the Japanese police during the periods of the occupation in World War II. Municipal archives from Shanghai and Nanjing were also examined. One conclusion reached was that the relevant archives in Korea are distorted. A conclusion of the study was that the Japanese Imperial government and the colonial government in Korea tried to avoid recording the illegal mobilization of comfort women. It was concluded that they burned most of the records immediately before the surrender; however, the study confirmed that some documents and records survived.

=== Number of comfort women ===
Professor Su Jiliang concludes that during the seven-year period from 1938 to 1945, comfort women in the territory occupied by the Japanese numbered 360,000 to 410,000, among whom she said half were Chinese, which she also said was the single largest group, about 200,000. She added 200,000 new victims from China to the already existing 200,000 figure of mostly non-Chinese comfort women accepted by western academics. Lack of official documentation has made estimating the total number of comfort women difficult. Vast amounts of material pertaining to war crimes, and the responsibility of the nation's highest leaders, were either destroyed or concealed on the orders of the Japanese government at the end of the war. Historians have arrived at various estimates by looking at surviving documentation, which indicates the ratio of soldiers in a particular area to the number of women and replacement rates of the women. Estimates by Japanese historians range from 20,000 to 200,000 comfort women.

"Credible academic researchers", in the words of international affairs and humanitarian law scholars Thomas J. Ward and William D. Lay, typically use Yoshiaki's estimate, though many monuments in the United States state as "more than 200,000".

The BBC quotes "200,000 to 300,000", and the International Commission of Jurists quotes "estimates of historians of 100,000 to 200,000 women".

=== Countries of origin ===
Most of the women were from occupied countries, including Korea, China, and the Philippines. Women who were used for military "comfort stations" also came from Burma, Thailand, French Indochina, Malaya, Manchukuo, Taiwan (then a Japanese dependency), the Dutch East Indies, Portuguese Timor, Papua New Guinea (including some mixed race Japanese-Papuans) and other Japanese-occupied territories. Stations were located in Japan, China, the Philippines, Indonesia, Malaya, Thailand, Burma, New Guinea, Hong Kong, Macau, and French Indochina. A smaller number of women of European origin were also involved, mostly from the Netherlands and Australia with an estimated 200–400 Dutch women alone, with an unknown number of other European women.

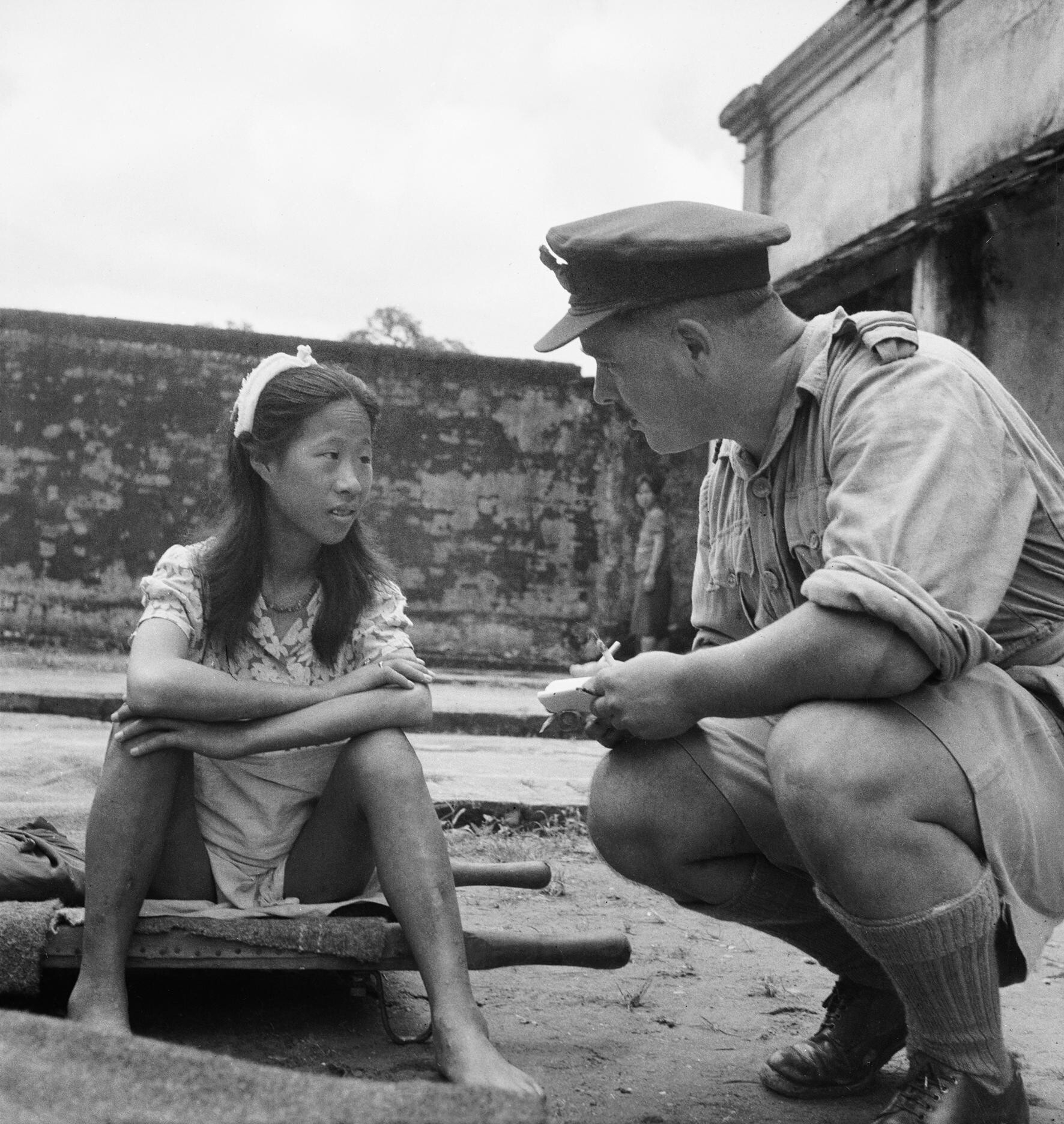
An ethnic Chinese comfort woman being interviewed by a flying officer of the Royal Air Force at Rangoon, August 8, 1945

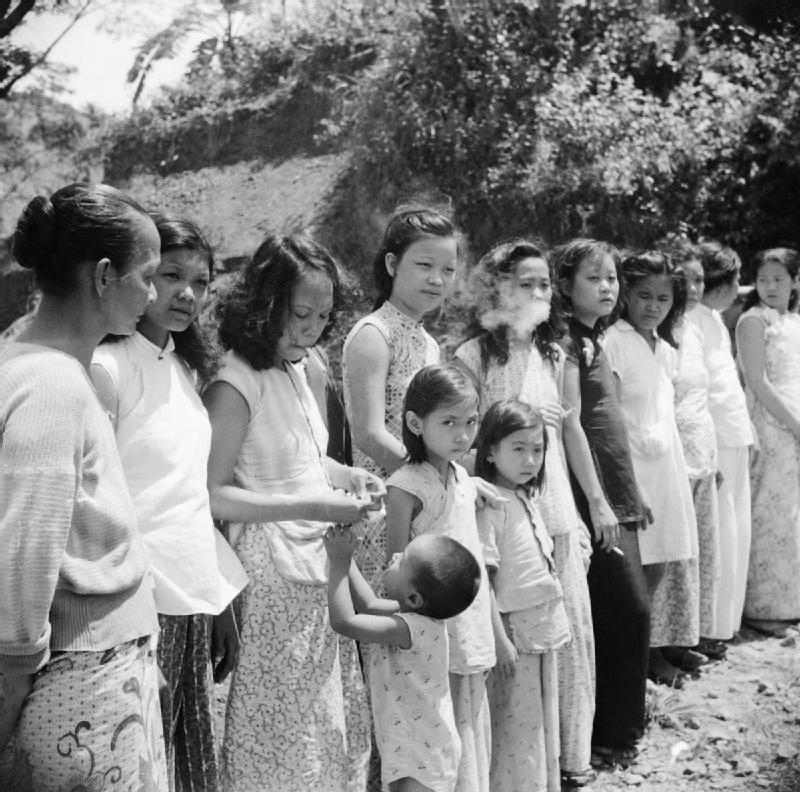
Chinese and Malayan girls forcibly taken from Penang by the Japanese to work as 'comfort girls' for the troops

According to State University of New York at Buffalo professor Yoshiko Nozaki and other sources, the majority of the women were from Korea and China. Chuo University professor and historian Yoshiaki Yoshimi discovered an abundance of documentation and testimony proving the existence of 2,000 comfort women stations where approximately 200,000 Korean, Filipina, Taiwanese, Indonesian, Burmese, Dutch, Australian, and Japanese women, many of whom were teenagers, were confined and forced to perform sexual activities with Japanese troops. According to Qiu Peipei of Vassar College, comfort women were replaced with other women at a rapid rate, making her estimates of 200,000–400,000 comfort women plausible, with half being Chinese women. Ikuhiko Hata, a professor of Nihon University, estimated the number of women working in the licensed pleasure quarter was fewer than 20,000 and that they were 40% Japanese, 20% Koreans, 10% Chinese, with others making up the remaining 30%. According to Hata, the total number of government-regulated prostitutes in Japan was only 170,000 during World War II. Others came from the Philippines, Taiwan, the Dutch East Indies, and other Japanese-occupied countries and regions. Some Dutch women, captured in Dutch colonies in Asia, were also forced into sexual slavery.

In further analysis of the Imperial Army medical records for venereal disease treatment from 1940, Yoshimi concluded that if the percentages of women treated reflected the general makeup of the total comfort women population, Korean women made up 51.8 percent, Chinese 36 percent and Japanese 12.2 percent.

In 1997, Bruce Cumings, a historian of Korea, wrote that Japan had forced quotas to supply the comfort women program and that Korean men helped recruit the victims. Cumings stated that between 100,000 and 200,000 Korean girls and women were recruited. In Korea, the daughters of the gentry and the bureaucracy were spared from being sent into the "comfort women corps" unless they or their families showed signs of pro-independence tendencies, and the overwhelming majority of the Korean girls taken into the "comfort women corps" came from the poor. The Army and Navy often subcontracted the work of taking girls into the "comfort women corps" in Korea to contractors, who were usually associated in some way with organized crime groups that were paid for girls they presented. Though a substantial minority of the contractors in Korea were Japanese, the majority were Korean.

In the Philippines during the Japanese occupation, around 1,000 Filipino women were made into comfort women. The victims were as young as 12 years old at the time of their enslavement. As many of the survivors recall, the garrisons or comfort stations/brothels were spread all over the Philippines. The garrisons were located from the northern region of Cagayan Valley to the Davao region in the south.

During the initial invasion of Dutch East Indies, Japanese soldiers raped many Indonesian and European women and girls. The Kenpeitai established the comfort women program to control the problem. The Kenpeitai forced and coerced many interned women to serve as prostitutes, including several hundred European women. A few of these chose to live in the homes of Japanese officers to serve one man as a sex slave rather than many men in a brothel. One such European woman, K'tut Tantri, of Scottish ancestry, wrote a book describing her ordeal. A Dutch government study described the methods used by the Japanese military to seize the women by force. It concluded that among the 200 to 300 European women found in the Japanese military brothels, "some sixty five were most certainly forced into prostitution". Others, faced with starvation in the refugee camps, agreed to offers of food and payment for work, the nature of which was not completely revealed to them. Some of the women also volunteered in hopes of protecting the younger ones. The number of women forced into prostitution may therefore be much higher than the Dutch record indicated. The number of Dutch women that were sexually assaulted or molested was also largely ignored. It was not until individuals and groups such as the Foundation of Japanese Honorary Debts began advocating for victims of the Japanese occupation that the plight of Dutch comfort women entered the collective conscience. As well as being raped and sexually assaulted every day and night, the Dutch girls lived in constant fear of beatings and other physical violence.

J. F. van Wagtendonk and the Dutch Broadcast Foundation estimated a total number of 400 Dutch girls were taken from the camps to become comfort women.

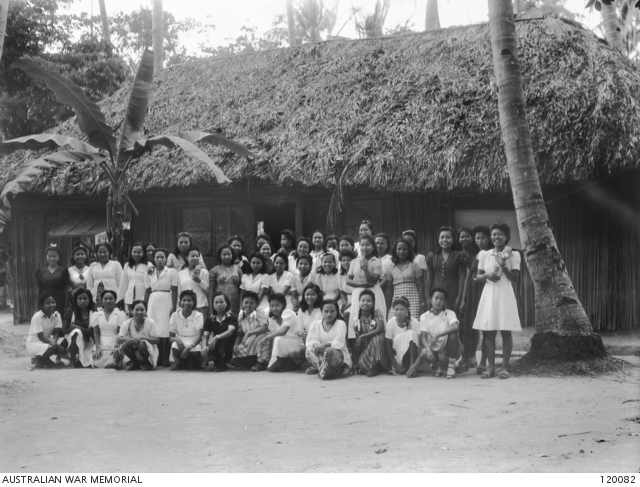
Javanese girls liberated by Australian troops from a Japanese brothel in Koepang, Timor, October 2, 1945

Besides Dutch women, many Javanese were also recruited from Indonesia as comfort women, including around 1000 East Timorese women and girls who were also used as sexual slaves. Most were adolescent girls aged 14–19 who had completed some education and were deceived through promises of higher education in Tokyo or Singapore. Common destinations of comfort women from Java included Burma, Thailand, and Eastern Indonesia. Interviews conducted with former comfort women also suggest that some women came from the island of Flores. After the war, many Javanese comfort women who survived stayed in the locations where they had been trafficked to and became integrated into local populations.

Melanesian women from New Guinea were also used as comfort women. Local women were recruited from Rabaul as comfort women, along with some number of mixed Japanese-Papuan women born to Japanese fathers and Papuan mothers. One Australian Captain, David Hutchinson-Smith, also mentioned mixed-race, young Japanese-Papuan girls conscripted as comfort women. A Papuan activist from Western New Guinea claimed an estimated 16,161 Papuan New Guinean comfort women were used by Japanese male soldiers during their occupation of New Guinea.

In 1985, Japanese comfort woman survivor Shirota Suzuko (1921–1993) released her autobiography, detailing the sufferings she and other women endured as comfort women.

More than 2,000 Taiwanese women were forced into sexual slavery by the Japanese military; as of 2020, only two were still believed to be alive. Yoshiaki Yoshimi notes that more than half of Taiwanese comfort women were minors. In 2023 the last surviving Taiwanese comfort woman died.

The Japanese academic Nakahara Michiko from Waseda University wrote a paper on comfort women in Malaysia who were forced to serve the Japanese military. She wrote that the Japanese targeted their comfort women recruitment from all ethnic groups and not just one in the occupied regions. The Malay Mustapha Yaakub, who was Youth International Bureau secretary for the UMNO -United Malays National Organisation (Pertubuhan Kebangsaan Melayu Bersatu, PEKEMBAR)- called for Malaysians who were victimized by Japanese soldiers such as comfort women to go out in public and talk about what happened in 1993. He received multiple letters including one known by the pseudonym P who was interviewed by Nakahara. However, Najib Tun Razak, the head of UMNO Youth and Defence Minister banned Mustapha Yaakub from talking about the Malay rape victims at the 1993 Austria United Nations Human Rights Conference. Nakahara wrote about an ethnic Malay comfort woman who was raped and forced into sex slavery at a comfort woman station by Japanese soldiers. The Malay rape victim said "I worked like an animal, they did to me just as they liked. I had to obey their orders until the surrender". Nakahara said "Her daughter told me her mother has nightmares and cries in her sleep. She used to wander aimlessly after the bad dreams ... She told me herself that she begged God for pardon for the sins she had committed. She still suffers from her memory and her feeling of having sinned. It seems nobody in her village ever told her that it was not her sin at all ... She had asked her daughter to write a letter for her. However, her long suffering was left unremedied". The Malay woman thought that the UMNO party would demand the Japanese government apologize and pay reparations since she was a member of the UMNO but the UMNO leadership refused to press the case.

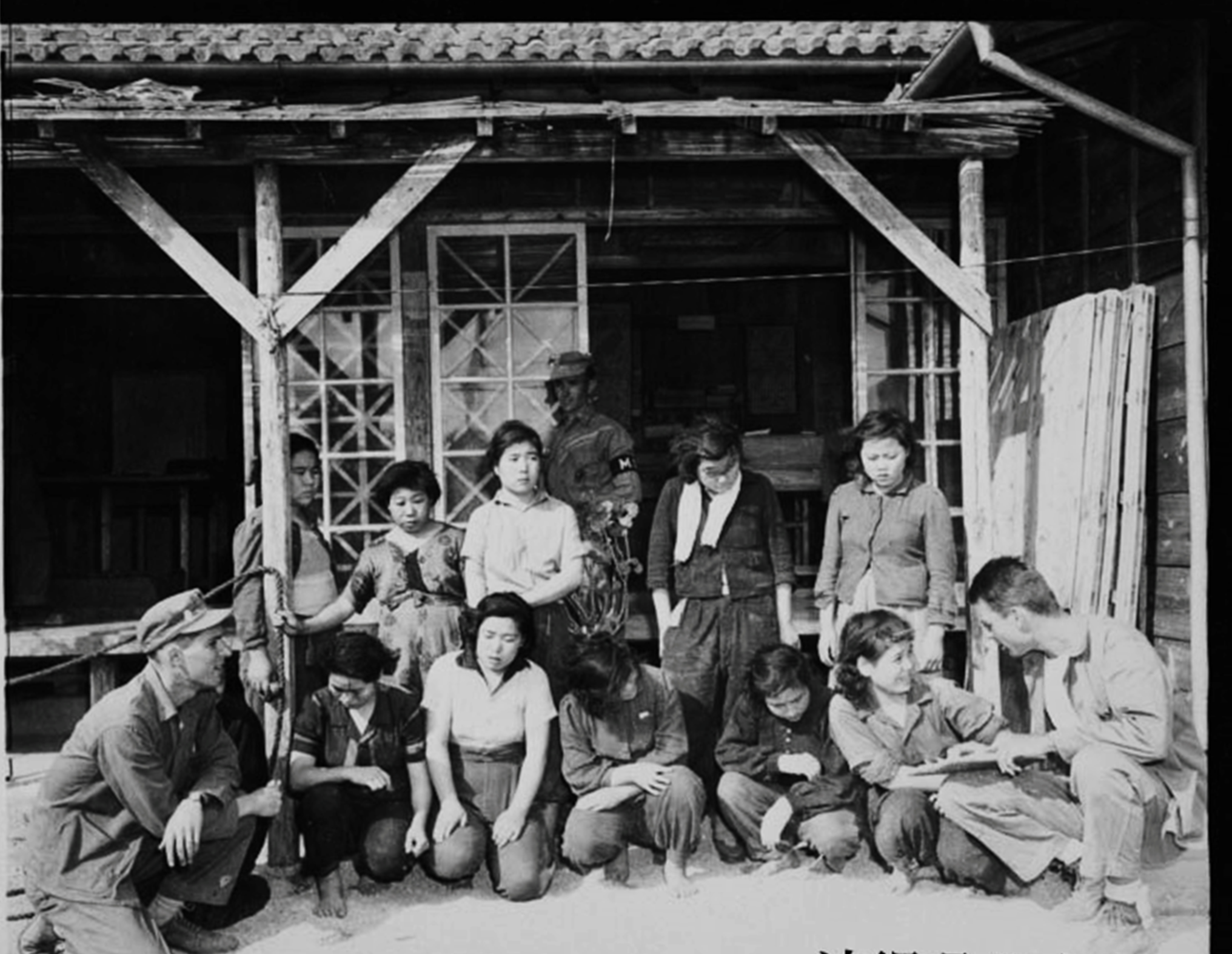
Korean comfort women on Okinawa being interviewed by U.S. marines after liberation

The Japanese forced ethnic Malay Muslim girls into becoming comfort women to be raped by Japanese soldiers. One of these Malay girls had her experience made into a historical play drama called Hayatie's Life (Hayat Hayatie) when she was raped by the Japanese in Singapore. Another play called Wild Rice was also based on another Malay comfort woman who did not tell her family in the 1980s how she was raped by the Japanese in the 1940s and sought to hide her humiliation from them.

On October 16–17, 1992, in Nepal, Kathmandu, the "Conference of International Investigation Committee on the Crimes of War of Japan" took place with members attending from Malaysia, Sri Lanka, Nepal, Bangladesh, India, Pakistan, Thailand, Japan, Algeria and France. The UMNO (United Malays National Organization) Youth secretary Musapha Yakuub was a Malay delegate at the meeting and comfort women were one of the topics there. Mustapha then started his own investigation and documentation of all Japanese crimes committed from 1942 to 1945 when they occupied Malaysia against its people. Mustapha urged all victims to report to him the atrocities that the Japanese had done in Malaysia and wanted to force the Japanese government to pay reparations and apologize by bringing up comfort women and forced labor which he called "cruel deeds" at the UN Human Rights Commission. Mustapha wanted to attend the May 1993 Austria, Vienna UN World Human Rights Conference and submit his report so that countries attacked by Japan could testify to the commission for the reparations and apologies. 3,500 Malaysians sent letters to Mustapha Yaakub in the span of 4 months. The victims thought the UMNO Malaysian government was going to demand reparations and an apology from Japan so they had turned up en masse since a UMNO official was behind the push. Their hopes were dashed when the UMNO heads led by Najiz Razak forced Mustapha Yaakub to back down so Japan did not apologize or pay reparations to Malay rape victims.

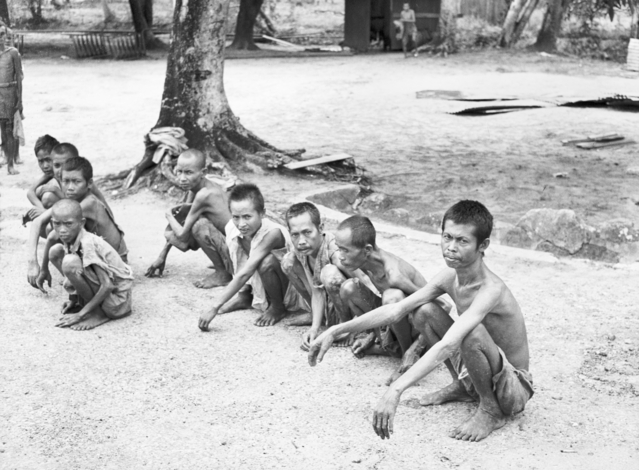
Nine of the 300 Indigenous people, Malays and Javanese who survived starvation while in Japanese detention in Miri. UMNO Malay officials attempted to hide Japanese atrocities against ethnic Malays.

Indigenous Indonesian Muslim Javanese girls and women were taken as comfort women by Japanese soldiers and raped. One Indonesian seaman named Sukarno Martodiharjo (unrelated to the Indonesian President Sukarno) witnessed Indonesian Muslim Javanese girls trafficked as comfort women by Japanese soldiers. Indonesian writer Pramudya Ananta Tur wrote about how Javanese Muslim Indonesian girls were taken as sex slaves by the Japanese and the fact that they were from high class prominent families and their fathers were tricked into sending them into prostitution since the Japanese lied to them and told them their daughters would study in Japan. Javanese collaborators included public servants, school headmasters, policemen, village heads, subdistrict heads and other local chiefs. A Javanese Indonesian Muslim girl, Siti Fatimah recalled being raped as a comfort woman by the Japanese after she was tricked into becoming a comfort woman. She was lied to and told she was being taken to Tokyo to study there and instead sent to a Japanese military brothel in Flores to be raped. Over 20,000 Indonesian women reported they were raped by Japanese soldiers since 1993 after the Indonesian government asked Indonesian women to report if they were victims of Japanese rape. Each Javanese Indonesian comfort woman trafficked to a station in Flores was raped by 23 Japanese men daily, 1 officer, 2 NCOs and 20 soldiers. They were expected to be raped by 100 men each week and received a ticket showing it from every one of them. The mass rapes committed by the Japanese against indigenous Javanese Indonesian Muslim women largely went unpunished since the Allied powers like the Dutch and Australians showed no interest in investigation or pressing charges against the Japanese for raping Indonesian women. The Dutch had sexually abused and raped indigenous Javanese Indonesian women for centuries, including using them as military prostitutes for Dutch soldiers; so the Dutch did not view what the Japanese did to Indonesians as a crime, but rather as a norm. The Japanese also destroyed tons of records related to Indonesian comfort women as they were losing the war so the true number of Indonesian comfort women is unknown. Sukarno, the first president of Indonesia, collaborated with the Japanese and recruited Indonesian girls as prostitutes for Japanese soldiers.

=== Treatment of comfort women ===
Women and girls were stripped of their agency and dehumanized as 'female ammunition', 'public toilets', or 'military supplies'. In order to help injured Japanese soldiers receive treatment, some of them were even forced to donate blood. Even though every victim's testimony was unique, they all shared commonalities: they all experienced severe and brutal physical, sexual, and psychological abuse. They were repeatedly beaten and forced to perform sexual service with 10 men on normal days and up to 40 men on days after combat.

Sufficient food, water, proper housing, toilets, and washing facilities were not provided to the women, and the extent of medical care was restricted to treating sexually transmitted diseases, sterilization, and terminating pregnancies. Torture was used against women who attempted to flee or refused to comply with the troops' demands. In addition, threats were made to the families of girls who attempted suicide.

It is estimated that most of the survivors became infertile because of the multiple rapes or venereal diseases contracted following the rapes.

Since comfort women were forced to travel to the battlefields with the Japanese Imperial Army, many comfort women perished as Allied forces overwhelmed Japan's Pacific defense and annihilated Japanese encampments. In certain cases, the Japanese military executed Korean comfort women when they fled from losing battles with the Allied Forces. During the last stand of Japanese forces in 1944–45, comfort women were often forced to commit suicide or were killed. During World war II, at Chuuk Lagoon, 70 comfort women were killed prior to the expected American assault, when the Navy mistook the American air raid as the prelude to an American landing. During the Battle of Saipan comfort women were among those who committed suicide by jumping off cliffs. In Burma, there were cases of Korean comfort women committing suicide by swallowing cyanide pills or being killed by hand grenades tossed into their dug-outs. During the Battle of Manila, when Japanese sailors ran amok and killed civilians indiscriminately, there were cases of comfort women being killed, though this does not seem to have been a systematic policy. The Japanese government had told the Japanese colonists on Saipan that the Americans were cannibals, and so the Japanese population preferred suicide to falling into the hands of the Americans. Many of the Asian comfort women may also have believed this. British soldiers fighting in Burma often reported that the Korean comfort women whom they captured were astonished to learn that the British were not going to eat them. Ironically, given this claim, there were cases of starving Japanese troops cut off on remote Pacific islands or trapped in the jungles of Burma turning towards cannibalism, and there were at least several cases where comfort women in Burma and on Pacific islands were killed to provide food for the Imperial Japanese Army.

According to an account by a survivor, she was beaten when she attempted to resist being raped. The women who were not prostitutes prior to joining the "comfort women corps", especially those taken in by force, were normally "broken in" by being raped. One Korean woman, Kim Hak-sun, stated in a 1991 interview about how she was drafted into the "comfort women corps" in 1941: "When I was 17 years old, the Japanese soldiers came along in a truck, beat us [her and a friend], and then dragged us into the back. I was told if I were drafted, I could earn lots of money in a textile factory ... The first day I was raped and the rapes never stopped ... I was born a woman but never lived as a woman ... I feel sick when I come close to a man. Not just Japanese men, but all men – even my own husband who saved me from the brothel. I shiver whenever I see a Japanese flag ... Why should I feel ashamed? I don't have to feel ashamed." Kim stated that she was raped 30–40 times a day, every day of the year during her time as a "comfort woman". Reflecting their dehumanized status, Army and Navy records where referring to the movement of comfort women always used the term "units of war supplies".

In the Philippines according to the recounts of Filipino survivors Narcisa Claveria, who was enslaved for 18 months at the age of 13, during the day the women were forced to cook, clean, and do laundry. At night the Japanese soldiers raped and abused the women. The story of the comfort women doing household chores during the day and being sexually abused at night was also recounted by another Filipino Survivor Fedencia David, who was kidnapped by Japanese soldiers at age 14, who also remembered being forced to wash clothes and cook for the Japanese soldiers. At night, she was raped by as many as 5 to 10 Japanese soldiers. Along with being raped multiple times a day the women were subjected to separation from their families, often watching their families being murdered by Japanese soldiers. One survivor recounts that when the Japanese soldiers took her, "soldiers began to skin her father alive." This maltreatment left physical and emotional scars.

Military doctors and medical workers frequently raped the women during medical examinations. One Japanese Army doctor, Asō Tetsuo, testified that the comfort women were seen as "female ammunition" and as "public toilets"—as literally just things to be used and abused—with some comfort women being forced to donate blood for the treatment of wounded soldiers. At least 80% of the comfort women were Korean, who were assigned to the lower ranks, while Japanese and European women went to the officers. For example, Dutch women captured in the Dutch East Indies (modern Indonesia) were reserved exclusively for the officers. Korea is a Confucian country where premarital sex was widely disapproved of, and since the Korean teenagers taken into the "comfort women corps" were almost always virgins, it was felt that this was the best way to limit the spread of venereal diseases that would otherwise incapacitate soldiers and sailors.

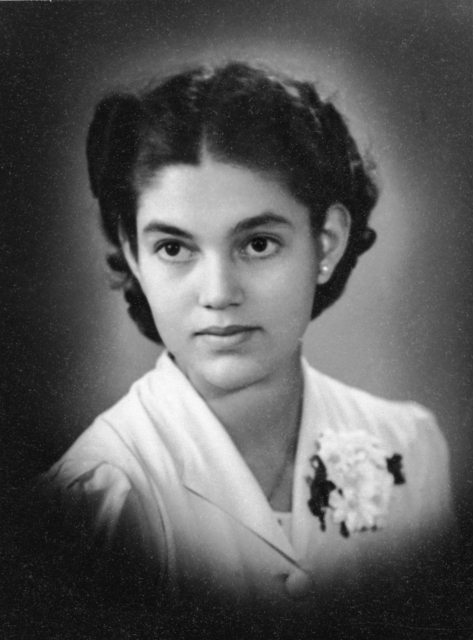
Studio portrait of Jan Ruff O'Herne, taken shortly before she, her mother and sisters, and thousands of other Dutch women and children were interned by the Imperial Japanese Army in Ambarawa. Over the following months, O'Herne and six other Dutch women were repeatedly raped and beaten, day and night, by IJA personnel.

Ten Dutch women were taken by force from prison camps in Java by officers of the Imperial Japanese Army to become forced sex slaves in February 1944. They were systematically beaten and raped day and night. As a victim of the incident, in 1990, Jan Ruff-O'Herne testified to a U.S. House of Representatives committee:

Many stories have been told about the horrors, brutalities, suffering and starvation of Dutch women in Japanese prison camps. But one story was never told, the most shameful story of the worst human rights abuse committed by the Japanese during World War II: The story of the "Comfort Women", the jugun ianfu, and how these women were forcibly seized against their will, to provide sexual services for the Japanese Imperial Army. In the "comfort station" I was systematically beaten and raped day and night. Even the Japanese doctor raped me each time he visited the brothel to examine us for venereal disease.

In their first morning at the brothel, photographs of Ruff-O'Herne and the others were taken and placed on the veranda which was used as a reception area for the Japanese personnel who would choose from these photographs. Over the following four months the girls were raped and beaten day and night, with those who became pregnant forced to have abortions. After four harrowing months, the girls were moved to a camp at Bogor, in West Java, where they were reunited with their families. This camp was exclusively for women who had been put into military brothels, and the Japanese warned the inmates that if anyone told what had happened to them, they and their family members would be killed. Several months later the O'Hernes were transferred to a camp at Batavia, which was liberated on August 15, 1945.

Suki Falconberg, a comfort women survivor, shared her experiences:

Serial penetration by many men is not a mild form of torture. Just the tears at the vaginal opening feel like fire applied to a cut. Your genitals swell and bruise. Damage to the womb and other internal organs can also be tremendous ... [B]eing used as a public dumping ground by those men left me with deep shame that I still feel in the pit of my stomach – it's like a hard, heavy, sick feeling that never entirely goes away. They saw not just my completely helpless, naked body, but they heard me beg, and cry. They reduced me to something low and disgusting that suffered miserably in front of them ... Even years later, it has taken tremendous courage for me to put these words on the page, so deep is the cultural shame ...

At Blora, twenty European women and girls were imprisoned in two houses. Over a period of three weeks, as Japanese units passed by the houses, the women and their daughters were brutally and repeatedly raped.

In the Bangka Island, most of the Australian nurses captured were raped before they were murdered.

The Japanese officers involved received some punishment by Japanese authorities at the end of the war. After the end of the war, 11 Japanese officers were found guilty, with one soldier being sentenced to death by the Batavia War Criminal Court. The court decision found that the charge violated was the Army's order to hire only voluntary women. Victims from East Timor testified they were forced into slavery even when they were not old enough to have started menstruating. The court testimonies state that these prepubescent girls were repeatedly raped by Japanese soldiers while those who refused to comply were killed.

Hank Nelson, emeritus professor at the Australian National University's Asia Pacific Research Division, has written about the brothels run by the Japanese military in Rabaul, in what is now Papua New Guinea during WWII. He quotes from the diary of Gordon Thomas, a POW in Rabaul. Thomas writes that the women working at the brothels "most likely served 25 to 35 men a day" and that they were "victims of the yellow slave trade". Nelson also quotes from Kentaro Igusa, a Japanese naval surgeon who was stationed in Rabaul. Igusa wrote in his memoirs that the women had to wash their genitals after each contact, but since some were unable to wash theirs effectively some due to inexperience, may have been a reason why they became infected with venereal disease, of which some of their genitalia became so badly swollen that they "cried and begged for help". the women continued to work through infection and severe discomfort, using the newly released sulpha drugs which Igusa claims brought about quick cures.

Contrarily, a report based on interrogation of 20 Korean comfort women and two Japanese civilians captured after the Siege of Myitkyina in Burma indicated that the comfort women lived comparatively well, received many gifts, and were paid wages while they were in Burma. The label 'homecoming women', originally referring to comfort women who returned to Korea, has remained as a pejorative term for sexually active women in South Korea.

=== Sterility, abortion and reproduction ===
The Japanese Army and Navy went to great lengths to avoid venereal diseases with large numbers of condoms being handed out for free. Japanese soldiers were required to use these "Attack No. 1"-branded condoms during sex. For example, documents show that in July 1943 the Army handed out 1,000 condoms for soldiers in Negri Sembilan and another 10,000 for soldiers in Perak. However, the women had no ability to resist or object when Japanese soldiers refused to wear condoms.

Comfort women were usually injected with Salvarsan (arsphenamine), which together with damage to the vagina caused by rape were the causes of unusually high rates of sterility among the comfort women.

As the war went on and as the shortages caused by the sinking of almost the entire Japanese merchant marine by American submarines kicked in, medical care for the comfort women declined as dwindling medical supplies were reserved for the servicemen. As Japanese logistics broke down as the American submarines sank one Japanese ship after another, condoms had to be washed and reused, reducing their effectiveness. Comfort women themselves and local laborers were required to wash and recycle the used condoms. In the Philippines, comfort women were billed by Japanese doctors if they required medical treatment. In many cases, comfort women who were seriously ill were abandoned to die alone.

The Survey of Korean Comfort Women Used by Japanese Soldiers said that 30% of the interviewed former Korean comfort women produced biological children and 20% adopted children after World War II.

== History of the recognition ==
In 2006 Henry Hyde of the U.S. House International Relations Committee received a document dated November 15th 1945. Originally declassified in March 1992 it provides evidence against some notions that the system of comfort women had little or no government involvement. In August 1944 a brothel owner was captured with his wife in Burma. Additionally, the pair was also accompanied by 20 prostitutes who were Korean. Originally in Japanese occupied Korea, the local army headquarters suggested to them to go into the comfort women trade. This suggestion was circulated to other Japanese individuals residing in Korea. A total of 22 girls were purchased from nearby families and villages with payment varying. In a letter addressed to all military headquarters of the Japanese army a request was given to provide the transporting parties with any support that was necessary such as medical care. The firsthand account was compiled jointly by Australian and American intelligence services. This led to the creation of Japanese Prisoner of War Interrogation report 49. According to the report, Korean women were deceived into being used as comfort women by the Japanese; in 1942, there were about 800 women trafficked from Korea to Burma for this purpose, under the pretence of being recruited for work such as visiting the wounded in hospitals or rolling bandages.

In Confucian cultures such as those of China and Korea, where premarital sex is considered shameful, the subject of the comfort women was ignored for decades after 1945 as the victims were considered pariahs. In Confucian cultures, traditionally an unmarried woman must value her chastity above her own life, and any women who loses her virginity before marriage for whatever reason is expected to commit suicide; by choosing to live, the survivors made themselves into outcasts. Moreover, documents such as the 1952 Treaty of San Francisco, as well as the 1965 treaty which normalised relations between Japan and South Korea, had been interpreted by the Japanese government as having their issues related to war crimes settled, despite the fact that none of them specifically mentioned the comfort women system.

The issue has been discussed in Korean newspapers since the war's end, with the number of articles jumping in the 1960s, when negotiations towards the normalization of Japan-Korea relations were underway, and further spiking in the 1980s, after the discovery of living former comfort women.

An early figure in comfort women research was the writer Kakou Senda, who first encountered photographs of comfort women in 1962, but was unable to find adequate information explaining who the women in the photographs were. Senda, through a long process of investigation, published the first book on the subject, entitled Military Comfort Women, in 1973. Nonetheless, the book did not garner widespread publicity, and his book has been widely criticized as distorting the facts by both Japanese and South Korean historians. In any event, this book did become an important source for 1990s activism on the issue. The first book written by a Korean on the subject of comfort women appeared in 1981, though it plagiarized a 1976 Japanese book by the zainichi author Kim Il-Myeon.

In 1982, a dispute over history textbooks sprang up after the Ministry of Education ordered a number of deletions in history textbooks related to Japanese wartime aggression and atrocities. This ignited protest from neighbouring countries such as China and also sparked interest in the subject among some Japanese, including a number of wartime veterans who began to speak more openly about their past actions. However, the comfort women issue was not a central topic and instead most of this resurgence in historical interest went towards other themes such as the Nanjing Massacre and Unit 731. Nevertheless, historians who had studied Japan's wartime activities in-depth were already aware of the existence of comfort women in general.

In August 2014, the Japanese newspaper Asahi Shimbun retracted articles that were published based on or including information from Seiji Yoshida, who claimed that he was responsible for the forced abduction of comfort women. The paper clarified that this does not weaken the evidence supporting the existence of comfort women. Following the retraction, attacks from conservatives increased. Takashi Uemura, a journalist who published an article in 1991 but was forced to retract it years later, faced threats and attacks from conservatives, with his employer, Hokusei Gakuen University, also receiving bomb threats from the same group. Ultranationalists further targeted his children, posting online messages encouraging people to drive his teenage daughter to suicide. Uemura sued for libel but lost his case against Professor Tsutomu Nishioka and Japanese news magazine Shūkan Bunshun.

The existence of comfort women in South Korea and activism in their favour began to build momentum following democratisation in 1987, but no former comfort woman had yet come forward publicly. After the Japanese government denied that the state was involved and rejected calls for apologies and compensation in a June 1991 Diet session, Kim Hak-sun came forward in August 1991 as the first to tell her story. She was followed by others in several different countries demanding an apology from the Japanese government through lawsuits being filed. The Japanese government initially denied any responsibility, but, in January 1992, historian Yoshiaki Yoshimi discovered official documents from the archives of the Defense Agency's National Institute of Defense Studies which indicated Japanese military involvement in establishing and running "comfort stations." Additionally, in January 1992 Asahi Shimbun published an article about Yoshiaki Yoshimi's discovery from the archives. Following this, Prime Minister Kiichi Miyazawa became the first Japanese leader to issue a statement specifically apologising for the comfort women issue. This led to an intense increase of public interest in the topic as well. In 1993, following multiple testimonies, the Kono Statement (named after then Chief Cabinet Secretary Yohei Kono) was issued by Japanese Government confirming that coercion was involved in seizing the comfort women.

All of this has since triggered a counterreaction from Japanese right-wing forces since the mid-1990s, with disputes over history textbooks being a common example. In 1999, the Japanese historian Kazuko Watanabe complained about a lack of sisterhood among Japanese women, citing a survey showing 50% of Japanese women did not believe in the stories of the comfort women, charging that many Japanese simply regard other Asians as "others" whose feelings do not count. In 2004, Minister of Education Nariaki Nakayama made known his desire to remove references to comfort women from history textbooks, and textbooks approved in 2005 contained no mentions of comfort women at all. In 2007, the Japanese government issued a response to questions which had been posed to Prime Minister Abe about his position on the issue, concluding that "No evidence was found that the Japanese army or the military officials seized the women by force." In 2014, Chief Cabinet Secretary Yoshihide Suga formed a team to reexamine the background of the report. The review brought to light coordination between Japan and South Korea in the process of composing the Kono Statement and concluded that, at the request of Seoul, Tokyo stipulated coercion was involved in recruiting the women. After the review, Suga and Prime Minister Shinzo Abe stated that Japan continues to uphold the Kono Statement.

In 2014, China released documents it said were "ironclad proof" that the comfort women were forced to work as prostitutes against their will, including documents from the Japanese Kwantung Army military police corps archives and documents from the national bank of Japan's puppet regime in Manchuria.

In 2019, the Ministry of Foreign Affairs of Japan asserted officially the view that the expression "sex slaves" contradicts the facts and should not be used, noting that this point had been confirmed with South Korea in a Japan-South Korea agreement.

=== Apologies and compensation 1951–2009 ===
The governments of South Korea and Japan maintained a cold relationship during the first republic under President Syngman Rhee. After several failed normalisation talks, no formal diplomatic relations were ever established by Rhee's ousting in 1960. The second republic under Prime Minister Jang Myeon made some progress on these talks, but this government was overthrown only a year later in the 1961 May 16 coup, and normalisation was once again delayed. The third republic was led by Park Chung-hee, a military strongman who served in the Japanese-aligned Manchukuo army during World War II. His administration placed high priority on normalising ties between the two states in order to facilitate his plans for economic modernisation and industrialisation. In talks between the two sides around 1964, Park's side initially demanded $364 million in compensation for Koreans forced into labor and military service during the Japanese occupation: $200 per survivor, $1,650 per death and $2,000 per injured person. Tokyo offered to compensate the victims directly, but Seoul insisted that Japan simply give the South Korean government financial aid instead. In the final agreement reached in the 1965 treaty, Japan provided an $800 million aid and low-interest loan package over 10 years. Park's government "spent most of the money on economic development, focusing on infrastructure and the promotion of heavy industry".

Initially, the Japanese government denied any involvement in the comfort women system, until Yoshimi Yoshiaki discovered and published documents from the Japanese Self-Defense Agency's library that suggested direct military involvement. In 1994, under public pressure, the Japanese government admitted its complicity and created the public-private Asian Women's Fund (AWF) to compensate former comfort women. The fund was also used to present an official Japanese narrative about the issue. Sixty one Korean, 13 Taiwanese, 211 Filipino, and 79 Dutch former comfort women were provided with a signed apology from the then prime minister Tomiichi Murayama, stating "As Prime Minister of Japan, I thus extend anew my most sincere apologies and remorse to all the women who underwent immeasurable and painful experiences and suffered incurable physical and psychological wounds as comfort women." Many former Korean comfort women rejected the compensations on principle – although the Asian Women's Fund was set up by the Japanese government, its money came not from the government but from private donations, hence the compensation was not "official". Eventually, 61 former Korean comfort women accepted 5 million yen (approx. $42,000 (Note: Estimated at January 1, 2007, exchange rate of .0084JPY/USD.)) per person from the AWF along with the signed apology, while 142 others received funds from the government of Korea. The fund was dissolved on March 31, 2007. However, the establishment of the AWF was criticized as a way for the Japanese government to evade state responsibility; the establishment of the fund also prompted protests from various Asian countries. Some recipients of compensation expressed gratitude, with statements such as, "I know they express the feelings of goodwill of the Japanese people. Thank you very much."

Three South Korean women filed suit in Japan in December 1991, around the time of the 50th anniversary of the Pearl Harbor attack, demanding compensation for forced prostitution. In 1992, documents which had been stored since 1958 when they were returned by United States troops and which indicated that the military had played a large role in operating what were euphemistically called "comfort stations" were found in the library of Japan's Self-Defense Agency. The Japanese Government admitted that the Imperial Japanese Army had forced tens of thousands of Korean women to have sex with Japanese soldiers during World War II. On January 14, 1992, Japanese Chief Government Spokesman Koichi Kato issued an official apology saying, "We cannot deny that the former Japanese army played a role" in abducting and detaining the "comfort girls," and "We would like to express our apologies and contrition". Three days later on January 17, 1992, at a dinner given by South Korean President Roh Tae Woo, the Japanese Prime Minister Kiichi Miyazawa told his host: "We Japanese should first and foremost recall the truth of that tragic period when Japanese actions inflicted suffering and sorrow upon your people. We should never forget our feelings of remorse over this. As Prime Minister of Japan, I would like to declare anew my remorse at these deeds and tender my apology to the people of the Republic of Korea." He apologized again the following day in a speech before South Korea's National Assembly. On April 28, 1998, the Japanese court ruled that the Government must compensate the women and awarded them US$2,300 (equivalent to $4,543 in 2025) each.

In 2007, the surviving women wanted an apology from the Japanese government. Shinzō Abe, the prime minister at the time, stated on March 1, 2007, that there was no evidence that the Japanese government had kept sex slaves, even though the Japanese government had already admitted the use of coercion in 1993. On March 27 the Japanese parliament issued an official apology.

=== Apologies and compensation since 2010 ===
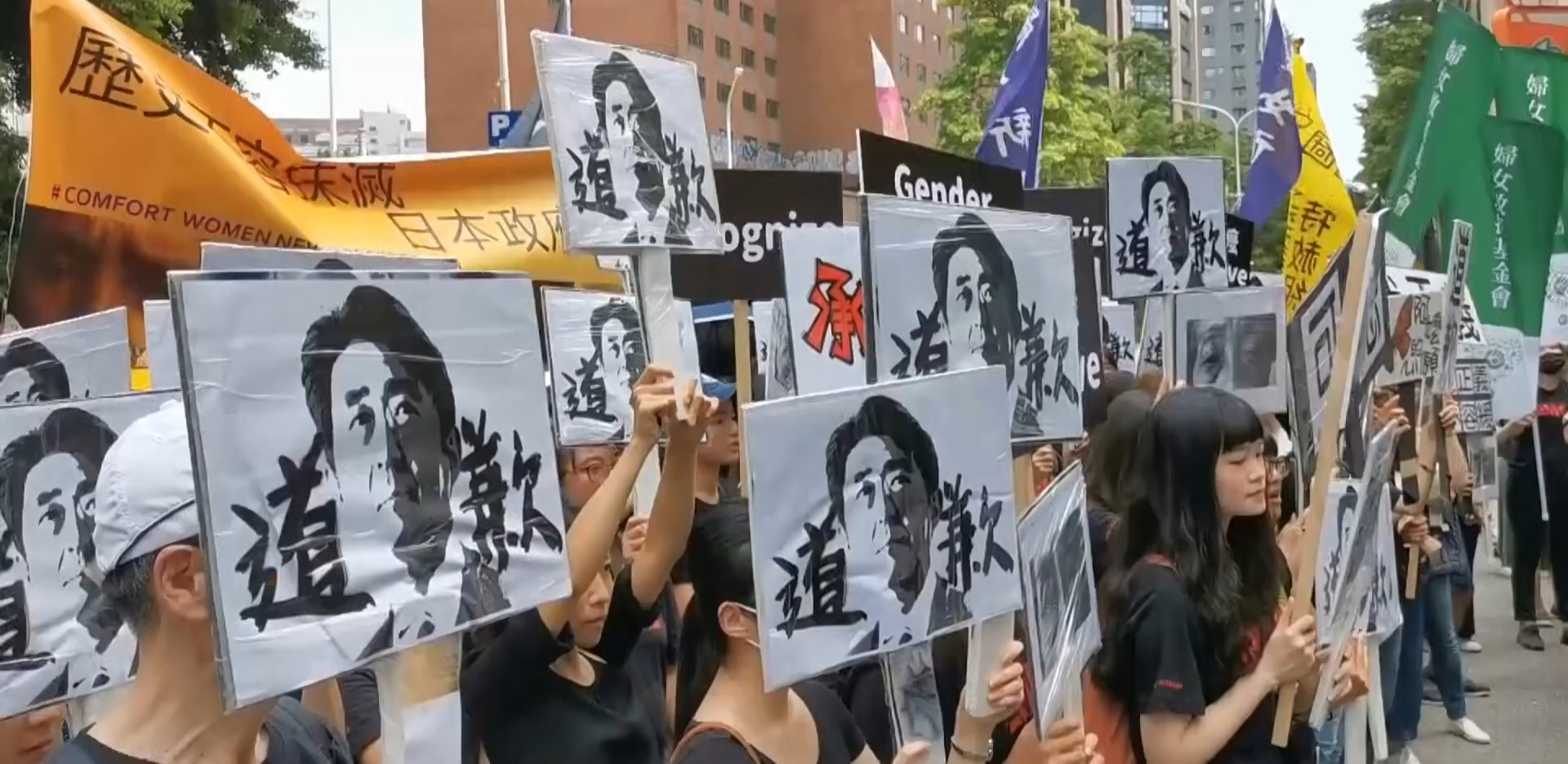
Protesters from the Taipei Women's Rescue Foundation protested outside the Japan-Taiwan Exchange Association, demanding that the Japanese government apologize to Taiwanese "comfort women", 2019.

On February 20, 2014, Chief Cabinet Secretary Yoshihide Suga said the Japanese government may reconsider the study and the apology. However, Prime Minister Abe clarified on March 14, 2014, that he had no intention of renouncing or altering it.

On December 28, 2015, Prime Minister Shinzo Abe and South Korean President Park Geun-hye formally agreed to settle the dispute. Abe again expressed his most sincere apologies and remorse to all the women. He acknowledged that they had undergone immeasurable and painful experiences and suffered incurable physical and psychological wounds as comfort women. He stated that Japan continued to hold the position that issues relating to property and claims between Japan and the ROK, including the issue of comfort women, had been settled completely and finally by the Japan-ROK Claims Settlement and Economic Cooperation Agreement of 1965 and welcomed the fact that the issue of comfort women is resolved "finally and irreversibly" with this agreement. Japan agreed to pay ¥1 billion (₩9.7 billion; $8.3 million) to a fund supporting surviving victims while South Korea agreed to refrain from criticizing Japan regarding the issue and to work to remove a statue memorializing the victims from in front of the Japanese embassy in Seoul. The announcement came after Japan's Foreign Minister Fumio Kishida met his counterpart Yun Byung-se in Seoul, and later Prime Minister Shinzo Abe phoned President Park Geun-hye to repeat an apology already offered by Kishida. The Korean government will administer the fund for the forty-six remaining elderly comfort women and will consider the matter "finally and irreversibly resolved". However, one Korean news organization, Hankyoreh, said that it fails to include the request from the survivals of sexual slavery to state the Japanese government's legal responsibility for the state-level crime of enforcing a system of sexual slavery. The South Korean government did not attempt to collect the viewpoints on the issues from the women most directly affected by it—the survivors themselves. Concerning the deal between two countries, literally, Seoul and Tokyo failed to reach a breakthrough on the comfort women issue during the 11th round of Foreign Ministry director-general level talks on December 15, 2015. Several comfort women protested the agreement as they claim they did not want money, but to see a sincere acknowledgement of the legal responsibility by the Japanese government. The co-representative of a support group of the surviving women expressed that the settlement with Japan does not reflect the will of the comfort women, and they vowed to seek its invalidation by reviewing legal options.

On February 16, 2016, the United Nations' Committee on the Elimination of Discrimination against Women, Seventh and Eighth Periodic Reports, was held, with Shinsuke Sugiyama, Deputy Minister for Ministry of Foreign Affairs (Japan), reiterating the official and final agreement between Japan and South Korea to pay ¥1 billion. Sugiyama also restated the Japanese Government apology of that agreement: "The issue of comfort women, with an involvement of the Japanese military authorities at that time, was a grave affront to the honor and dignity of large numbers of women, and the Government of Japan is painfully aware of responsibilities."

In August 2016, twelve comfort women filed suit against the government of South Korea, declaring that the government had nullified the victims' individual rights to claim damages from Japan by signing an agreement not to demand further legal responsibility without consulting with the victims themselves. The suit claimed the 2015 deal violated a 2011 Constitutional Court ruling that the South Korean government must "offer its cooperation and protection so that citizens whose human dignity and values have been violated through illegal actions perpetrated by Japan can invoke their rights to demand damages from Japan."

In January 2018, South Korea's president Moon Jae-in called the 2015 agreement "undeniable" and said that it "finally and irreversibly" was an official agreement between the two countries; however, when referring to aspects of the agreement he found flawed, he said: "A knot wrongly tied should be untied." These remarks came a day after the government announced it would not seek to renew the 2015 agreement, but that it wanted Japan to do more to settle the issue. Moon said: "A real settlement would come if the victims can forgive, after Japan makes a sincere apology and takes other actions". In March 2018, the Japanese government argued that the 2015 Japan-South Korea agreement confirmed that this issue was finally and irreversibly resolved and lodged a strong protest to South Korea through diplomatic channels, stating that "such a statement goes against the agreement and is therefore completely unacceptable and extremely regrettable".

On June 15, 2018, The 20th civil division of Seoul Central District Court dismissed the comfort women's suit seeking damages against the South Korean government for signing the 2015 agreement with Japan. The court announced that the intergovernmental comfort women agreement "certainly lacked transparency or was deficient in recognizing 'legal responsibility' and on the nature of the one billion yen provided by the Japanese government". However, "an examination of the process and content leading up to the agreement cannot be seen as discharging the plaintiffs' right to claim damages." An attorney for the survivors said they would be appealing the decision on the basis that it recognizes the lawfulness of the 2015 Japan-South Korean agreement.

On January 8, 2021, Seoul Central District Court ordered the government of Japan to pay reparations of 100 million won ($91,300) each to the families of the twelve women. On the court case, referring to the principle of Sovereign immunity guaranteed by International law, the Prime Minister Yoshihide Suga said that "a sovereign state should not be put under the jurisdiction of foreign courts", claiming that the lawsuit should be rejected. And Suga stressed that the issue is already settled completely and finally, through the 1965 Agreement on the Settlement of Problems concerning Property and Claims and on Economic Cooperation". On the same day, Foreign Minister Toshimitsu Motegi also spoke about the lawsuit of a claim for damages against Japanese government consistently in Extraordinary Press Conference from Brazil.

In April 2021, in a separate case, a judge at Seoul Central District Court rejected an effort to order Japan to compensate 20 comfort women and their relatives, citing state immunity and "an inevitable diplomatic clash" between Japan and South Korea governments should the lawsuit proceeded. Lee Yong-soo, a former comfort woman and one of the plaintiffs, said she would seek international litigation.

On June 25, 2021, the Japanese government announced that Prime Minister Yoshihide Suga stands by statements made by past administrations apologizing for Japan's aggression in World War II and admitting the military had a role in coercing comfort women, "largely from the Korean Peninsula", to work in brothels.

In November 2023, Seoul High Court overturned the April 2021 ruling saying state immunity was not applicable to the case because Japan violated international treaties to which it was a party (as well as Japan's own criminal law) that banned sexual slavery and other crimes by the time of World War II. Additionally, the court ordered Japan's government to pay 200 million South Korean wons (US$154,000) in damages to a group of comfort women, most of whom had already died and were represented by their families. Japan condemned the ruling as "extremely regrettable and absolutely unacceptable", and summoned South Korean ambassador Yun Duk Min to Japan to protest it.

While acknowledging that women and girls suffered during the war, the Japanese government denies any evidence that they were taken by force.

=== Concerns and controversies regarding apologies ===
Apologies from Japanese officials have faced scrutiny for their lack of sincerity. For instance, in the Kono Statement, while acknowledging the Japanese military's role in the comfort women system, officials denied coercion and forced transportation of women, and declined to provide compensation to the victims. Kono's apology was meticulous in distinguishing the actions of the Japanese army from those of the Japanese government, ensuring that the Japanese government bore no legal liability or responsibility for its treatment of the comfort women. Also, many victims viewed the apology as insufficient because it was delivered by the Cabinet Secretary of Japan and never officially adopted by the Japanese Parliament. Subsequent apologies were also criticized as insincere because they were delivered by the current prime minister of Japan rather than the National Diet, which would have signified an apology backed by the Japanese government. Subsequent apologies written and signed by the standing prime minister of Japan were distributed by the Asian Women's Fund, which is a non-governmental organization, rendering these apologies unofficial.

Japan has largely disregarded recommendations from the United Nations Human Rights Council, as well as the rulings from the Women's International War Crimes Tribunal concerning Japan's military sexual slavery. Japan has resisted pressure from other countries, including the United States and the European Union, who have passed resolutions urging the Japanese government to respond. Instead, Japan has indicated that it does not consider these statements legally binding and therefore does not feel obligated to act upon them.

=== Controversies ===
A 2001 comic book, Neo Gomanism Manifesto Special – On Taiwan by Japanese author Yoshinori Kobayashi, depicts kimono-clad women lining up to sign up for duty before a Japanese soldier. Kobayashi's book contains an interview with Taiwanese industrialist Shi Wen-long, who stated that no women were forced to serve and that the women worked in more hygienic conditions compared to regular prostitutes because the use of condoms was mandatory.

Moreover, 'patriotic' emerging faiths in Japan like Happy Science and certain Christian factions advocating for the merging of religion and state have initiated a concerted effort domestically and internationally to deny the existence of the comfort women system. They've gathered extensive support from Japanese citizens who refute the existence of the comfort women issue, alleging it as a concoction by left-leaning factions. Several leaders of these groups are women.

In early 2001, in a controversy involving national public broadcaster NHK, what was supposed to be coverage of the Women's International War Crimes Tribunal on Japan's Military Sexual Slavery was heavily edited to reflect revisionist views. In 2014, the new president of NHK compared the wartime Japanese comfort women program to Asian brothels frequented by American troops, which western historians countered by pointing out the difference between the Japanese comfort stations, which forced women to have sex with Japanese troops, and Asian brothels, where women chose to be prostitutes for American troops.

In publications around 2007, Japanese historian and Nihon University professor Ikuhiko Hata estimates the number of comfort women to have been more likely between 10,000 and 20,000. Hata claims that "none of the comfort women were forcibly recruited". Historian Chunghee Sarah Soh noted that Hata's initial estimate was at approximately 90,000, but he reduced that figure to 20,000 for political reasons. He has been criticized by other Japanese scholars for minimizing the hardship of comfort women.

In 2012, the former mayor of Osaka and co-leader of the Japan Restoration Party, Tōru Hashimoto initially maintained that "there is no evidence that people called comfort women were taken away by violence or threat by the [Japanese] military". He later modified his position, asserting that they became comfort women "against their will by any circumstances around them", still justifying their role during World War II as "necessary", so that soldiers could "have a rest".

In 2013, Yuzuru Nishida, who was member of House of Representatives in Japan, said that the women voluntarily engaged in prostitution and that the estimated number of comfort women was significantly exaggerated.

In 2014, Foreign Minister Hirofumi Nakasone chaired a commission established to consider "concrete measures to restore Japan's honor with regard to the comfort women issue", despite his own father Yasuhiro Nakasone, having organized a "comfort station" in 1942 when he was a lieutenant paymaster in Japan's Imperial Navy.

In 2014, the Japanese Foreign Ministry attempted to pressure McGraw Hill into erasing several paragraphs on comfort women from one of their textbooks. The attempt was unsuccessful, and American academics criticized Japanese attempts to revise the history of comfort women.

In 2018, the Japan Times changed its description of the terms "comfort woman" and "forced labourer" causing a controversy among staff and readers.

On August 18, 2018, United Nations rights experts and UN Committee on the Elimination of Racial Discrimination expressed that Japan should do more for sufferers of wartime sexual slavery. Japan responded by stating it has already made numerous apologies and offered compensation to the victims.

Japanese politicians have demanded the removal of comfort women monuments located in other countries. They have demanded the removal of comfort women statues in Palisades Park, New Jersey, United States; San Francisco, California, United States; and Berlin, Germany, with each demand rejected by the relevant authorities.

In 2019, about 24 members of Malaya Lolas, an organization that supports Filipina survivors of sexual slavery during World War II, filed a complaint at UN's Committee on the Elimination of Discrimination Against Women (CEDAW) regarding the Philippine government's failure to fight for their cause, which resulted in ongoing discrimination against comfort women, that continues to this day. In 2023, CEDAW came up with a decision and recommended the government to provide the complainants with full reparation, including material compensation and an official apology for the continuing discrimination.

Based on a statement made by Representative Seijuro Arahune of the Japanese Diet in 1975 in which he claimed to cite numbers provided by Korean authorities during the 1965 Korea-Japan Treaty negotiations, as many as three-fourths of Korean comfort women may have died during the war. However, according to the Japanese government, the validity of this statement has since been brought into question as the number does not seem to be based on an actual investigation on the matter.

Mio Sugita, who is a member of the Liberal Democratic Party and served as a member of the House of Representatives, dismissed the comfort women issue as a fabrication.

The Japanese government denies evidence that women were coerced into sexual slavery but acknowledges that girls and women suffered.

==== Asahi Shimbun Third-Party Investigative Committee ====
In August 2014, the Asahi Shimbun, Japan's second largest newspaper in circulation, retracted 16 articles published between 1982 and 1997. The articles were concerned with former imperial army officer Seiji Yoshida, who claimed he had forcibly taken Korean women to wartime Japanese military brothels from the Jeju Island region in South Korea. Following the retraction of the articles, the newspaper also refused to publish an op-ed on the matter by Japanese journalist Akira Ikegami. The public response and criticism that ensued pushed the newspaper to nominate a third-party investigative committee headed by seven leading scholars, journalists and legal experts. The committee report dealt with the circumstances leading to the publication of Yoshida's false testimony and to the effect these publications had on Japan's image abroad and diplomatic relations with various countries. It found that the Asahi was negligent in publishing Yoshida's testimony, but that the reports on the testimony had "limited" effect on foreign media outlets and reports. On the other hand, the report found that Japanese officials' comments on the issue had a far more detrimental effect on Japan's image and its diplomatic relations.

==== Fraud accusations against support groups ====
In 2004, 13 former comfort women filed a complaint against the Korean Council for the Women Drafted for Military Sexual Slavery and the House of Sharing with the Seoul Western District Court to prevent these two organizations from profiting and exploiting the victims' past experiences to collect donations. The victims accused Shin Hye-Soo, head of the Korean Council at the time, and Song Hyun-Seob, Head of the House of Sharing, of using the women's past experiences in videos and leaflets without their permission to solicit donations and then keeping the money instead of using it to help the victims. The complaint further stated that a significant number of victims did not receive compensation through the citizen-funded Asian Women's Fund established in 1995 by Japan due to the opposition from the organizations in 1998. In addition, they accused the institutions of recruiting six former comfort women survivors from China and paying them to get them to partake in weekly rallies. The complaint was dismissed by the court in May 2005.

Again, in May 2020, Lee Yong-soo, a comfort woman survivor and longtime activist for the victims, held a press conference and accused the Korean Council and its former head, Yoon Mee-hyang, of exploiting her and other survivors, politically and financially for decades, to obtain government funds and public donations through the protests while spending little money aiding them.

Consequently, a civic group filed a complaint against Yoon Mee-hyang, a lawmaker-elect and former head of the Korean Council for Justice and Remembrance for the Issues of Military Sexual Slavery by Japan. After an investigation, the Seoul Western District Prosecutors' Office indicted Yoon, on eight charges including fraud, embezzlement and breach of trust.

Among the charges, Yoon was indicted for is a count of quasi-fraud against Gil Won-ok, a 92-year-old survivor. The prosecution said Gil has dementia and that Yoon had exploited her reduced physical and mental capacities and pressed her to donate a total of 79.2 million won ($67,102) to the Korean Council between November 2017 and January 2020.

Additionally, she was accused of fraud and embezzlement of almost half a million dollars from governmental organizations and private donors, which were used to buy properties and even pay tuition for her daughter's education at the University of California.

In a forensic audit of the comfort women's shelter controlled by Yoon's group, it was found that 2.3% of its $7.5 million budget raised since 2015 was actually spent on supporting the living needs of surviving comfort women, many of whom live in cramped quarters, with substandard care, with few luxuries.

In September 2020, the Democratic Party (DP) suspended Yoon's party membership due to the charges that she was facing.

On November 14, 2024, South Korea's Supreme Court upheld the conviction of Yoon Mee-hyang, on charges of embezzlement. Yoon was sentenced to 18 months in prison, with the sentence suspended for three years. The court found her guilty of misappropriating funds intended for supporting victims.

==== International Court of Justice ====
The Comfort Women survivors have asked the Korean government multiple times to bring their case in front of the International Court of Justice, but South Korea has yet to respond.

==== International court cases ====
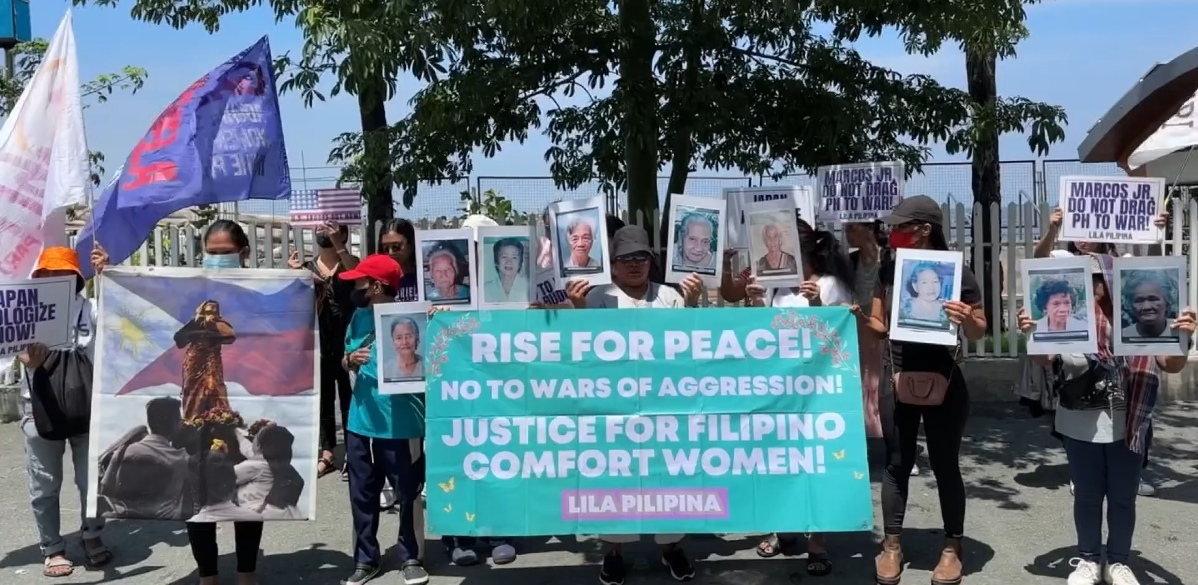
Members of the Malaya Lolas held a demonstration with families of Philippine "comfort women" on International Memorial Day for "Comfort Women" (August 14) 2024 in Manila, Philippines.

Members of the group "Malaya Lolas" in the Philippines have attempted to go to Tokyo to file a suit in the Japanese courts. The lolas were unable to file the lawsuit because, according to the Japanese government, international law required them to be represented by the Philippine government. The lolas filed a case in the Philippine courts, Vinuya et al. v. Executive Secretary et al. The case was directed at the Executive Secretary at the time, Alberto G. Romulo, and the main plaintiff was the leader of Malaya Lolas, Isabelita Vinuya. The lolas filed this case to get the Philippine government to support them in pursuing a petition for compensation in the Japanese courts. The Philippine government won the case with the court stating that the Philippine government "is not under any international obligation to espouse petitioners' claims."

=== International support ===
The cause has long been supported beyond the victim nations, and associations like Amnesty International are campaigning in countries where governments have yet to support the cause, like in Australia, or New Zealand.

Support in the United States continues to grow, particularly after the passage of United States House of Representatives House Resolution 121 on July 30, 2007. The resolution expresses that the government of Japan should formally redress the situation by acknowledging, apologizing and accepting historical responsibility for the use of comfort women by its armed forces; have the Prime Minister of Japan give a public apology; and educate their people using internationally accepted historical facts about the crime while refuting any claims that deny the crime. In July 2012, then Secretary of State Hillary Clinton, a strong advocate of the cause, denounced the use of the euphemism 'comfort women' for what should be referred to as 'enforced sex slaves'. The Obama Administration also addressed the need for Japan to do more to address the issue. In addition to calling attention to the issue, the American memorial statues erected in New Jersey in 2010 and California in 2013 show support for what has become an international cause.

On November 28, 2007, the Parliament of Canada unanimously passed a motion that recognized Japan's use of women as sex slaves during the Second World War, demanding Japan to make a formal sincere apology to all victims.

In 2007, the Netherlands' House of Representatives passed a resolution that urged Japan to apologize for its wartime sex slavery, and to pay compensations to former comfort women.

On December 13, 2007, the European Parliament adopted a resolution on "Justice for the 'Comfort Women' (sex slaves in Asia before and during World War II)" calling on the Japanese government to apologise and accept legal responsibility for the coercion of young women into sexual slavery before and during WWII.

In 2014, Pope Francis met with seven former comfort women in South Korea. Also in 2014, the U.N. Committee on the Elimination of Racial Discrimination called for Japan to, as the committee's deputy head Anastasia Crickley puts it, "conclude investigations into the violations of the rights of 'comfort women' by the military and to bring to justice those responsible and to pursue a comprehensive and lasting resolution to these issues". U.N. Human Rights Commissioner Navi Pillay had also spoken out in support of comfort women several times.

=== Health-related issues ===
In the aftermath of the war, the women recalled bouts of physical and mental abuse that they had experienced while working in military brothels. In the Rorschach test, the women showed distorted perceptions, difficulty in managing emotional reactions and internalized anger. A 2011 clinical study found that comfort women were more prone to showing symptoms of post-traumatic stress disorder (PTSD), even 60 years after the end of the war.

=== Survivors ===
The last surviving victims have become public figures in Korea, where they are referred to as "halmoni", the affectionate term for "grandmother". There is a nursing home, called House of Sharing, for former comfort women in South Korea. China remains more at the testimony collection stage, particularly through the China "Comfort Women" Issue Research Center at Shanghai Normal University, sometimes in collaboration with Korean researchers. For other nations, the research and the interaction with victims is less advanced.

Despite the efforts at assigning responsibility and victims compensation, in the years after World War II, many former Korean comfort women were afraid to reveal their past, because they are afraid of being disowned or ostracized further.

== Memorials and organizations ==
=== China ===
On December 1, 2015, the first memorial hall dedicated to Chinese comfort women was opened in Nanjing. It was built on the site of a former comfort station run by the invading Japanese troops during World War II. The memorial hall stands next to the Memorial Hall of the Victims in Nanjing Massacre by Japanese Invaders.

In 1999, the Research Center for Chinese Comfort Women was established at Shanghai Normal University. Its museum opened in June 2016.

In 2000, the first international conference on the study of Chinese comfort women was held in Shanghai.

=== Taiwan ===
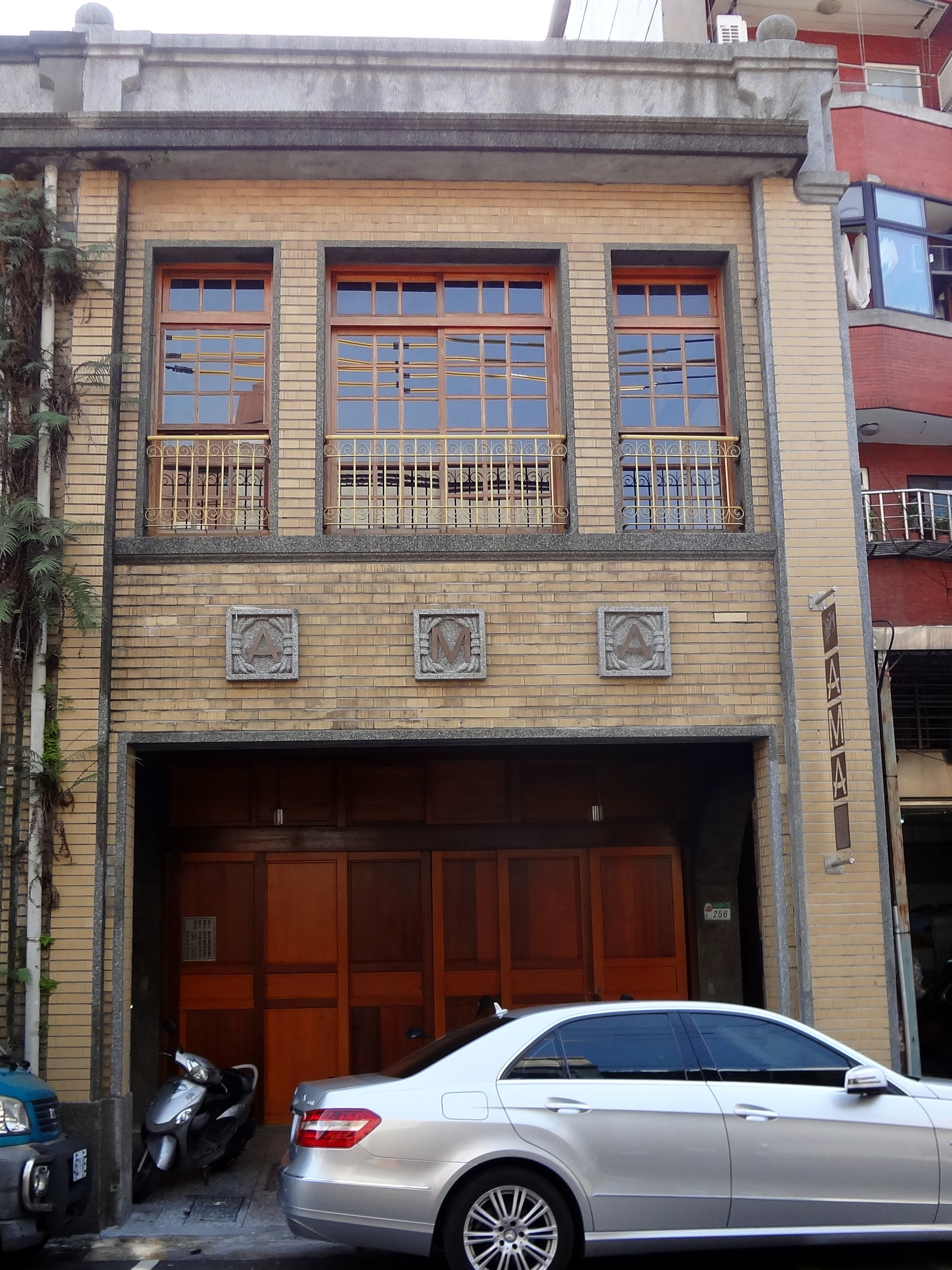
The Ama Museum in Taipei dedicated to Taiwanese comfort women

Since the 1990s, Taiwanese survivors have been bringing to light the comfort woman issue in Taiwanese society, and gaining support from women's rights activists and civil groups. Their testimony and memories have been documented by newspapers, books, and documentary films.

Survivors' claims against the Japan government have been backed by the Taipei Women's Rescue Foundation (TWRF) a non-profit organization helping women against violence, and sexual violence. This organization gives legal and psychological support to Taiwanese comfort women, and also helps in the recording of testimony and doing scholarly research. In 2007, this organization was responsible for promoting awareness in society, by creating meetings in universities and high schools where survivors gave their testimonies to students and the general public. TWRF has produced exhibitions that give survivors the opportunity to be heard in Taipei, and also in the Women's Active Museum on War and Peace, based in Tokyo.

Thanks to this increasing awareness in society, and with the help of TWRF, Taiwanese comfort women have gained the support their government, which on many occasions has asked the Japanese government for apologies and compensation.

In November 2014, "Song of the Reed", a documentary film directed by Wu Hsiu-ching and produced by TWRF, won the International Gold Panda documentary award.

In 2016, a museum dedicated to comfort women, the Ama Museum, opened in Taipei.

On August 14, 2018, the first 'comfort women' statue in Taiwan was unveiled in the city of Tainan. The statue symbolizes women forced to work in wartime brothels for the Japanese military. The bronze statue portrays a girl raising both hands to the sky to express her helpless resistance to suppression and silent protest, according to its creator. In September 2018, Japanese right-wing activist Mitsuhiko Fujii kicked the statue and caused outrage in Taiwan, with the Taiwanese government branding his behavior as unacceptable. A Japanese right-wing group with affiliations to him apologized for his behavior and said he resigned from his group position. In 2024, the land that the statue was on was sold at auction and the statue was put into a warehouse.

=== South Korea ===
==== Wednesday demonstrations ====
Every Wednesday, living comfort women, women's organizations, socio-civic groups, religious groups, and a number of individuals participate in the Wednesday Demonstrations in front of the Japanese Embassy in Seoul, sponsored by "The Korean Council for the Women Drafted for Military Sexual Slavery by Japan (KCWDMSS)". It was first held on January 8, 1992, when Japan's Prime Minister Kiichi Miyazawa visited South Korea. In December 2011, a statue of a young woman was erected in front of the Japanese Embassy to honor the comfort women on the 1,000th Wednesday Demonstration. The Japanese government has repeatedly asked the South Korean government to have the statue taken down, but it has not been removed.

On December 28, 2015, the Japanese government claimed that the Korean government agreed to the removal of the statue. As of September 3, 2016, the statue was still in place due to a majority of the South Korean population being opposed to the agreement. On December 30, 2016, another comfort woman statue identical to the one in front of the Japanese Embassy in Seoul was erected in front of the Japanese consulate in Busan, South Korea. As of January 6, 2017, the Japanese government is attempting to negotiate for the removal of the statue. On May 11, 2017, newly elected South Korean President Moon Jae-in announced the agreement would not be enacted in its current stage and that negotiations for a deal between Japan and South Korea over the comfort women dispute had to start over.

On June 30, 2017, the local government of Busan enacted the legal foundation to protect the Statue of Peace by passing the relative ordinance. By reason of this, it has become difficult to shift the site or demolish the statue.

On August 14, 2018, South Korea held an unveiling ceremony for a monument memorializing Korean women forced to work in wartime brothels for the Japanese military, as the nation observed its first official comfort women memorial day.

On November 21, 2018, South Korea officially cancelled the 2015 agreement and shut down the Japan-funded comfort women foundation which was launched in July 2016 to finance the agreement's settlement to the victims. The settlement had received criticism from victims' groups.

==== House of Sharing ====
The House of Sharing is a nursing home for living comfort women. The House of Sharing was founded in June 1992 through funds raised by Buddhist organizations and various socio-civic groups and it moved to Gyeonggi-do, South Korea in 1998. The House of Sharing includes "The Museum of Sexual Slavery by Japanese Military" to spread the truth about the Japanese military's brutal abuse of comfort women and to educate descendants and the public.

==== Archives by comfort women ====
Some of the survivors, Kang Duk-kyung, Kim Soon-duk and Lee Yong-Nyeo, preserved their personal history through their drawings as a visual archive. Also, the director of the Center for Asian American Media, Dai Sil Kim-Gibson, made a comfort women video archive, a documentary film for K–12 through college level students. Feminist visual and video archives have promoted a place for solidarity between the victims and the public. It has served as a living site for the teaching and learning of women's dignity and human rights by bringing people together despite age, gender, borders, nationality, and ideologies.

=== Philippines ===
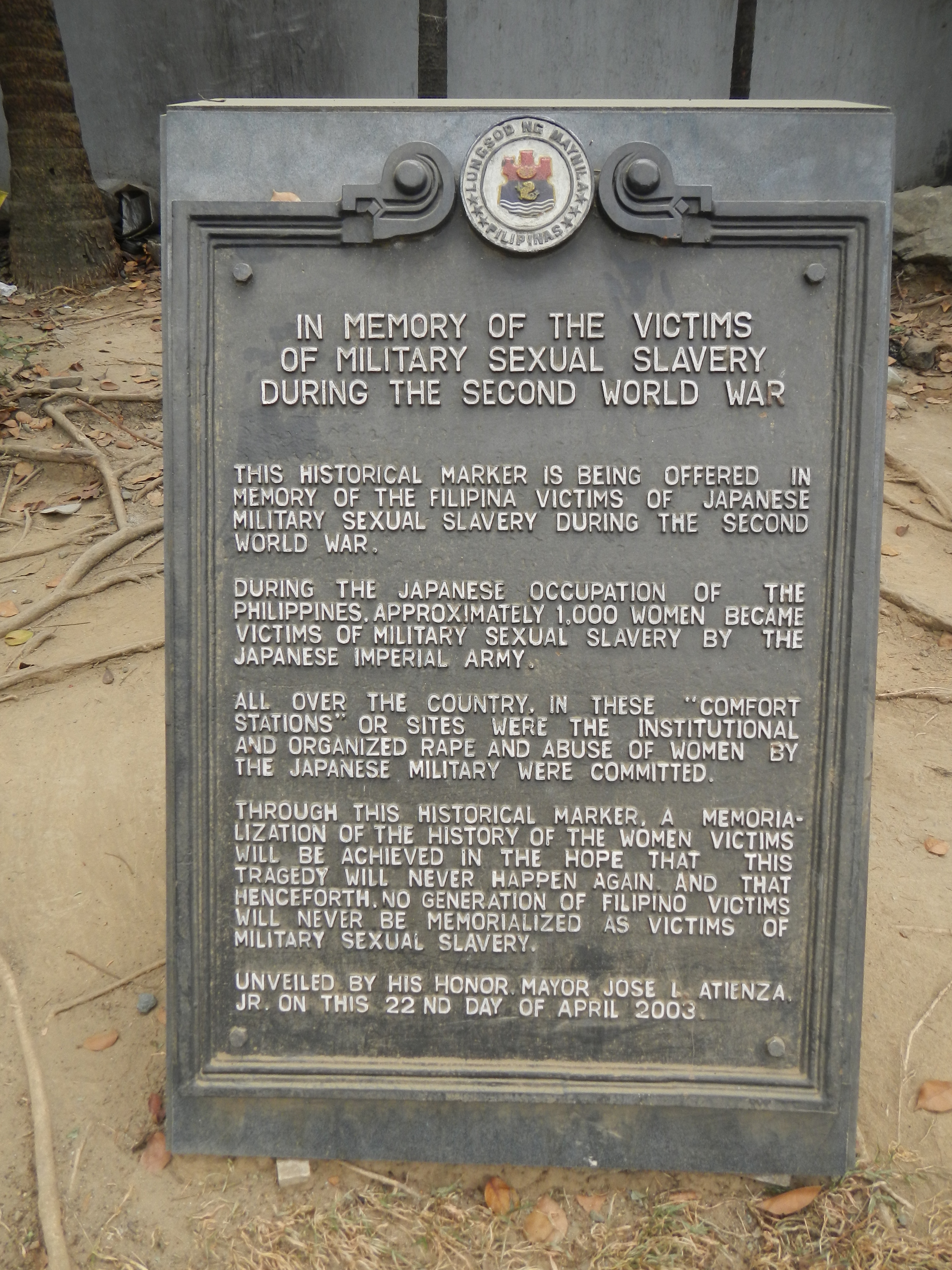
Historical Marker, Plaza Lawton, Liwasang Bonifacio, Manila

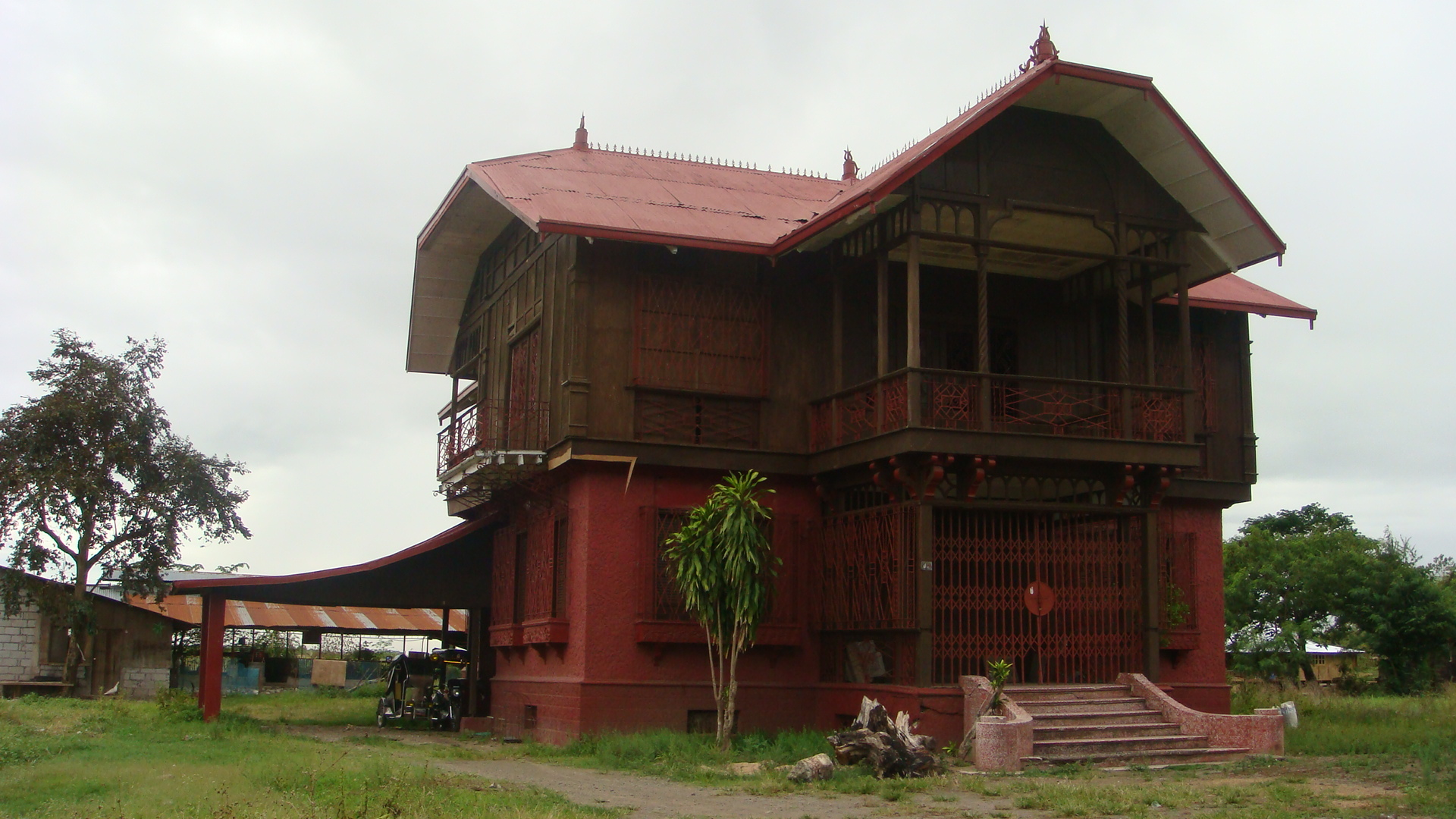
Bahay na Pula in San Ildefonso, Bulacan, used as barracks by Japanese soldiers in World War II where young Filipino comfort women were imprisoned and used as sex slaves

Comfort women in the Philippines, called "Lolas" (grandmothers), formed different groups similar to the Korean survivors. One group, named "Lila Pilipina" (League of Filipino Women), started in 1992 and is member of GABRIELA, a feminist organization. In their brochure they list their demands in two categories, ones to the Japanese government and those for the Philippine government. From the Japanese government Lila Pilipina has five demands:

1. "that Japan fulfills its responsibility in the full disclosure of all information in its war archives concerning the operation of the "comfort stations" and the "comfort women" system
2. "adequate compensation for the women victims and their families from the Japanese government,"
3. "for the Japanese government to include as reference in its textbooks and history books the reality of military sexual slavery through "comfort women" during World War II as a crime,"
4. "for the Japanese government to admit the use of force and violence in the conscription and treatment of the "comfort women" as military sex slaves, contrary to Japanese government report,"
5. "a formal apology to the Filipino people and specifically to the women victims and their families for having a direct hand in the conscription of Asian women for military sexual slavery."

From the Philippine government Lila Pilipina also has five demands:

1. "to issue an official position declaring the comfort women system as a war crime, condemning the Japanese government in its direct involvement for institutionalized sexual slavery and demanding formal apology and compensation for the victims and their families,"
2. "to conduct an official investigation and documentation of the comfort women issue,"
3. "to include the reality of the "comfort women" and "comfort stations" during World War II in Philippine history. These include the curriculum, textbooks and other instructional materials used both in public and private educational institutions in all levels,"
4. "to build historical markers and shrines around the country for the comfort women and war victims of World War II as a reminder to the present generation of the sad realities behind wars of aggression,"
5. "to provide material support for the victims, survivors, and their families."

Lila Pilipina together with the Malaya Lolas (Free grandmothers) took legal actions against Japan. These groups also ask the Philippine government to back their claims against the Japanese government. These groups have taken legal actions against Japan. Malaya Lolas had attempted to go to Tokyo to file a suit in the Japanese courts. Still, according to the Japanese government, the lolas themselves could not file a lawsuit due to international law stating that the lolas need to be represented by the Philippine government. In 2004 the Malaya Lolas filed a cause, Vinuya et al. v. Executive Secretary et al., asking for the support of the Philippine government in pursuing a petition for compensation in the Japanese courts. A decision was made on April 28, 2010, supporting the Philippine government. As of August 2014, after failing in legal action against their own government to back their claims, they planned to take the case the UN Committee on the Elimination of Discrimination against Women and Children (CEDAW).

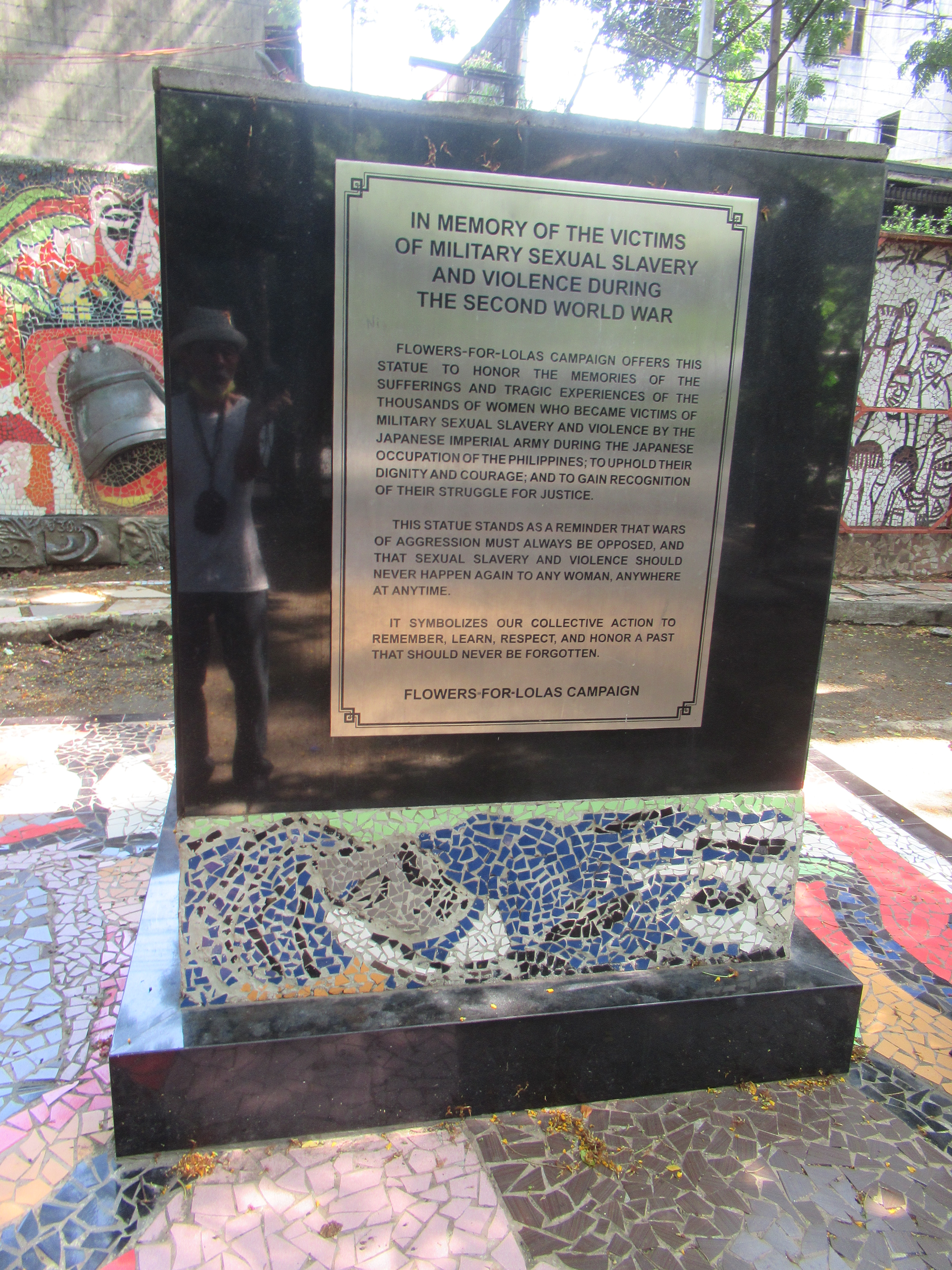
Flower-for-Lolas Campaign Monument

These groups have made demonstrations in front of the Japanese embassy in Manila on many occasions, and have given testimonies to Japanese tourists in Manila. The Filipino news channel ABS-CBN has done interviews with the surviving lolas to bring awareness to the experience of lolas under the Japanese occupation and to remind people that Japan's crimes were not committed that long ago and should not be forgotten.

Similar to the Korean grandmothers, Filipino "Lolas" have their own Grandmother house with a collection of their testimonies. Also two of them have published two autobiographic books: Comfort Woman: Slave of Destiny by Rosa Henson and The Hidden Battle of Leyte: The Picture Diary of a Girl Taken by the Japanese Military by Remedios Felias. This second book was written in the 1990s, after Lila Filipina was formed.

In Bulacan, there is an empty villa house Bahay na Pula (meaning Red House in English) which was seized by Japanese soldiers during WWII and had been used as a comfort station where Filipino women were raped and held as comfort women. The Bahay na Pula is seen as a memorial to the forgotten Filipino comfort women in the Philippines.

On December 8, 2017, the 'Filipina Comfort Women' statue by artist Jonas Roces was installed in Baywalk, Roxas Boulevard in Manila. About four months later, the statue was removed by government officials due to a "drainage improvement project" along the Baywalk. It was later declared missing in 2019 when the statue artist Jonas Roces failed to deliver the statue for its reinstallation at the Baclaran Church.

In 2019, a similar memorial statue in a Catholic-run shelter for the elderly and the homeless in San Pedro, Laguna was removed only two days after it was unveiled to the public. The bronze statue of a young woman with fists resting on her lap was removed without explanation and notice. The move came after the Japanese embassy complained.

=== United States ===
In 2010, the first American monument dedicated to the comfort women was established in Palisades Park, New Jersey.

On March 8, 2013, Bergen County erected a comfort women memorial on the lawn of the Bergen County Courthouse in Hackensack, New Jersey.

In 2013, a memorial statue to comfort women called Peace Monument of Glendale was established in Glendale, California. The statue has been subject to multiple legal attempts to remove it. A 2014 lawsuit seeking the statue's removal was dismissed. In 2013, Mio Sugita, Yuzuru Nishida and Hiromu Nakamaru, three members of the Japanese House of Representatives, urged Glendale to take down the statue.

On May 30, 2014, a memorial was dedicated behind the Fairfax County Government Center in Virginia.

On August 16, 2014, a new memorial statue honoring the comfort women was unveiled in Southfield, Michigan.

In June 2017, Brookhaven, Georgia unveiled a statue memorializing the Comfort Women of World War II.

On September 22, 2017, in an initiative led by the local Chinese-American community, San Francisco erected a privately funded San Francisco Comfort Women Memorial to the comfort women of World War II. Some Japanese and Japanese-American opponents of the initiative argue the statue would promote hatred and anti-Japanese sentiment throughout the community and object to the statue singling out Japan. Tōru Hashimoto, the mayor of Osaka, Japan, objected that the memorial should be "broadened to memorialize all the women who have been sexually assaulted and abused by soldiers of countries in the world". Supporting the statue, Heather Knight of the San Francisco Chronicle pointed to the San Francisco Holocaust Memorial and the landmarked Japanese internment camps in California as evidence that Japan is "not being singled out". In protest over the statue, Osaka ended the sister city relationship with San Francisco that had been established since 1957. When the city accepted the statue as public property in 2018, the mayor of Osaka sent a 10-page letter to the mayor of San Francisco, complaining of inaccuracies and unfairly singling out Japan for criticism.

A 2010 proposal to create a memorial in Koreatown, Fort Lee, New Jersey has been controversial and was undecided as of 2017. On May 23, 2018, a comfort women memorial was installed in Constitution Park in Fort Lee. Youth Council of Fort Lee, a student organization led by Korean American high school students in Fort Lee designed the memorial.

Despite the recognition of comfort women provided by the United States of America education on Japanese war crimes like comfort women is not focused on in the American education system. Additionally the United States was perpetrating similar acts during their post war occupation of Japan. Comfort women despite being primarily perpetrated by Imperial Japanese Forces were sometimes perpetrated in a similar fashion to the Japanese system by American occupying focus in Japan post second world war. The justification used by the Americans for comfort women was the same reason used by the imperial Japanese forces. Author and historian Yuki Tanaka uses both the American and Japanese use of comfort women to argue against the state of militarism.

=== Germany ===
In March 2017, the first comfort women statue in Europe was erected in Wiesent, Bavaria, Germany. The statue was a replica of the bronze statue installed in front of the Japanese Embassy in Seoul. Another German city, Freiburg, had planned to set up a comfort woman statue there but it was scrapped due to "strong obstruction and pressure" by Japan.

=== Canada ===
In 2016, the first statue in Canada devoted to comfort women was placed in Toronto.

=== Australia ===
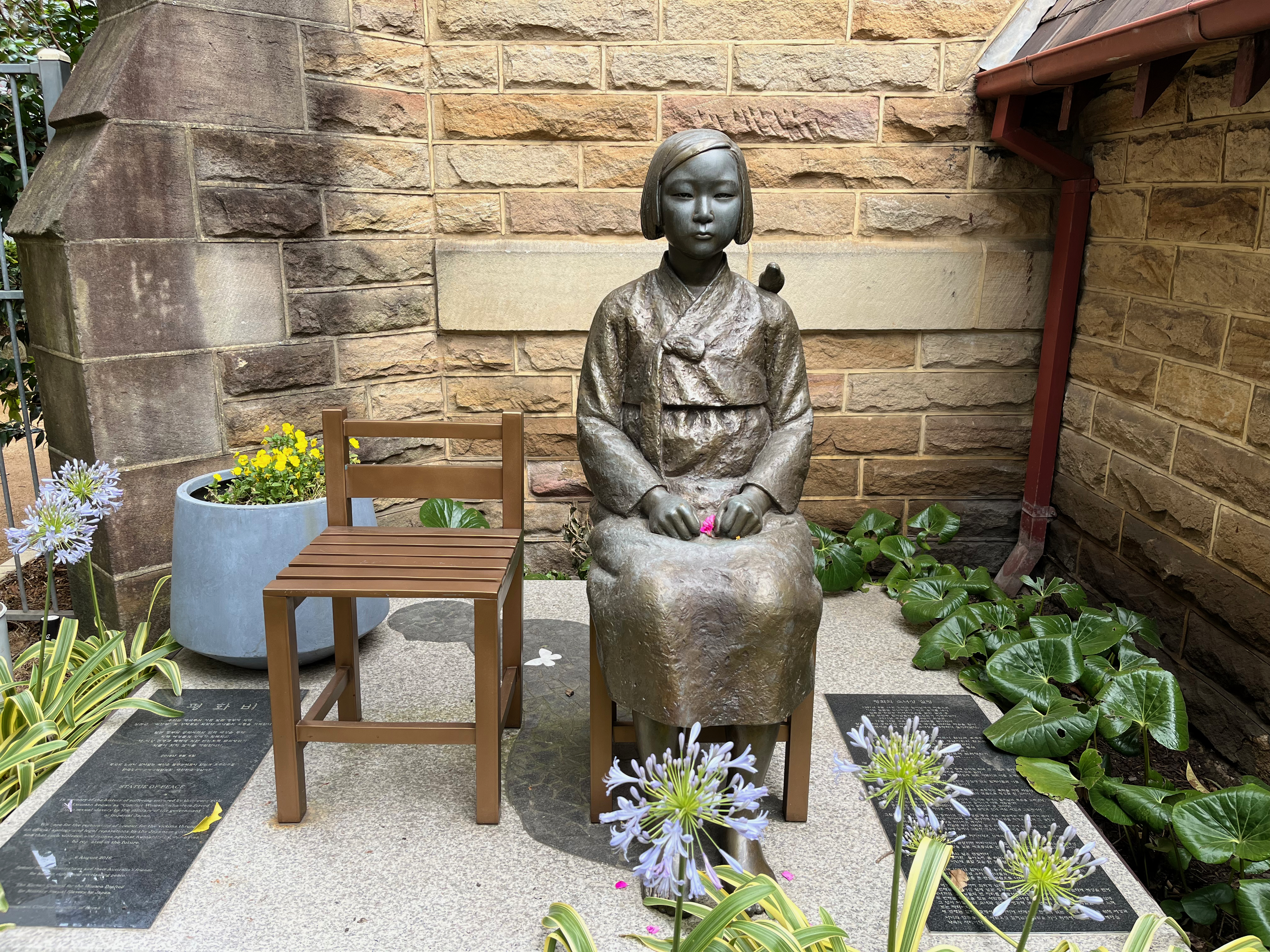
Statue of Peace at Ashfield Uniting Church

A comfort women statue was unveiled in Sydney in August 2016. The 1.5-metre statue imported from Korea was originally meant for a public park in Strathfield, but local council rejected it. Reverend Bill Crews then agreed to install the statue outside his church, Ashfield Uniting Church. He said, "It's finally found a home."

=== New Zealand ===
In April 2026, an Auckland Council local board voted against a proposal to install a comfort women memorial statue following public consultation and objections raised by Japanese officials, with the consultation process indicating a "lack of community support for the proposal".

== Notable former comfort women ==
Former comfort women have provided public accounts of their experiences:

- Dutch East Indies – Jan Ruff O'Herne (1923–2019); nl:Ellen van der Ploeg (1923–2013)
- Korea – Gil Won-ok (1928–2025); Kim Hak-sun (1924–1997); Lee Yong-soo (1928–); Song Sin-do (1922–2017); Yoo Hee-nam (1927–2016); Kim Bok-dong (1926–2019)
- Philippines – Rosa Henson (1927–1997); Remedios Felias (1928–); Isabelita Vinuya (1931–2021)
- Taiwan – Liu Huang A-tao (1923–2011)

== Culture ==
=== Art ===
- Red Angel is a 1966 Japanese war drama film by Yasuzō Masumura where there are scenes of comfort women.
- City of Life and Death is a 2009 Chinese film written and directed by Lu Chuan. The movie is based on the Nanjing Massacre that took place during the Second Sino-Japanese War. Several scenes of Chinese women tearfully volunteering themselves as comfort women to save the rest of the refugees are depicted, as well as their plight, pain and eventual death.
- Snowy Road is a 2015 South Korean film that tells the story about two teenage girls who are taken away from their homes and forced to become comfort women for the Japanese.
- Spirits' Homecoming is a 2016 South Korean period drama film about comfort women.
- I Can Speak is a 2017 South Korean comedy-drama film starring Na Moon-hee as an elderly woman who travels to the United States to testify about her experience as a comfort woman.
- Herstory is a 2018 South Korean drama film based on a real-life story of three comfort women and seven other victims during the Gwanbu Trial which took place in Shimonoseki in 1992.
- How We Disappeared is a 2019 novel by Jing-Jing Lee about a Singaporean woman forced into sexual slavery by the Japanese occupiers.
- Pulang Araw, is a 2024 Filipino war drama series where there are scenes of comfort women.

=== Media ===
- A Secret Buried for 50 Years is a 1998 documentary about the stories of 13 comfort women in Taiwan.
- Within Every Woman is a 2012 documentary by Canadian filmmaker Tiffany Hsiung on the Japanese comfort women program.
- Thirty-Two is a 2014 Chinese documentary about the lives of the 32 still-living Chinese comfort women.
- The Apology is a 2016 documentary about three former comfort women seeking justice and stating their story.
- Twenty-Two is a 2017 Chinese documentary about the lives of the 22 still-living Chinese comfort women.
- Tomorrow Episode 13 of the Korean Netflix series Tomorrow explores the traumatic experiences of the comfort women. The fate of three of these women is the focus of the 60-minute episode Spring, with the peace monument in front of the Japanese embassy in Seoul also playing a significant role.
- Kokosuni, is a 2022 KBS documentary film by reporter Lee Seok-jae, on the revisionist histories of comfort women.

== See also ==
- List of former comfort women
- 1921 International Convention for the Suppression of the Traffic in Women and Children
- Diary of a Japanese Military Brothel Manager
- German camp brothels in World War II
  - House of Dolls/Joy Division
- German military brothels in World War II
- Bordel militaire de campagne
- Human trafficking
- Historical negationism
- Karayuki-san
  - Karayuki-san, the Making of a Prostitute, a documentary about Japanese women forced into prostitution in occupied territories in WWII
- Korean Women's Volunteer Labour Corps
- List of war apology statements issued by Japan
- Nora Okja Keller, author of the 1997 novel, Comfort Woman
- Park Yu-ha
- Rape during the occupation of Japan
- Rape during the occupation of Manchuria
- Rape of Nanjing
- Recreation and Amusement Association, military prostitution in occupied Japan
- Sexual jihad
- United States House of Representatives House Resolution 121
- United States Military and prostitution in South Korea
- Walterina Markova, a "comfort gay"
- Wartime sexual violence
- Forced prostitution
- Crimes against humanity
- Anti-Korean sentiment in Japan § Comfort women issue
- Sexual slavery
- Comfort women in the arts
