= Kokosuni =

Korean documentary on sexual violence and exploitation during the Japanese occupation

- 코코순이
- Directed by: Lee Seok-jae
- Produced by: KBS (Korean Broadcasting System)
- Release date: 2022
- Country: South Korea
- Language: Korean

Kokosuni (Korean: 코코순이) or KOKO SunYi is a 2022 historical documentary film produced by national broadcaster KBS. The subject is the so-called "comfort women", the victims of sexual slavery in occupied Korea and other Asia-Pacific territories, and the historical revisionism of its existence.

The documentary was directed by KBS reporter Lee Seok-jae.

The personal story of a woman named KokoSunyi, is dramatised in the documentary, and is interspersed with interviews with historians, and interactions with revisionists such as J. Mark Ramseyer. Lee Hyori was featured on the soundtrack.

== Critical response ==
The KBS2 movie review show I Love Movies (영화가 좋다) named the film as "pick of the week".

== Legacy ==
In 2023, the film was re-broadcast on KBS on Liberation Day (15 August), and a number of local groups held commemoration events and showed the film in local venues.
