= Within Every Woman =

2012 documentary film by Tiffany Hsiung

- Directed by: Tiffany Hsiung
- Screenplay by: Tiffany Hsiung
- Based on: War crimes and the comfort woman system of the Japanese Imperial Army during World War II
- Produced by: Chris Kang
- Production company: Gold Nugget Productions
- Distributed by: Toronto ALPHA
- Release date: 2012
- Language: English

Within Every Woman is a documentary film by Tiffany Hsiung, depicting war crimes committed by the Japanese Imperial Army during World War II in Asia. It documents the systematic rape of over 200,000 young girls between the ages of nine and twenty-years-old during World War II in Asia. These atrocities and war crimes occurred between 1931 and 1945; however, to this day, the Japanese government has not offered an official apology and many survivors still hide their shame.

This project was started in 2008, with a trip to rural China, the Philippines and South Korea to meet and document the survivors of the largest institutionalized rape system in world history, the comfort women system. Today, the survivors are referred to as "the Grandmothers", all above the age of 80. This documentary will show the complex healing processes of the women who have had to live their lives without acknowledgement of the atrocities they suffered.

== History ==
World War II in Asia began in 1937 with the Second Sino-Japanese War, which was marked by atrocities underscored by the infamous Japanese scorched earth policy and an institutionalized "comfort woman" rape system that abducted girls and women aged 9 to 22 from Korea, the Philippines, Indonesia and China for military sexual slavery.

== Toronto ALPHA ==
The directors and producers of Within Every Woman are collaborating with Toronto ALPHA in order to achieve their systematic goals of raising awareness of Japanese War Crimes during World War II.

== Hot Docs Canadian International Documentary Festival ==
Within Every Woman was selected to participate in the 2011 pitch forum at the Hot Docs Canadian International Documentary Festival on May 4 and 5. The project was pitched to a round table of local and international buyers. A short trailer was shown during the 7 minute pitch, followed by a 7-minute-long moderated question period.

== Kickstarter campaign ==
A Kickstarter campaign was started in order to engage a larger audience and promote the documentary. Through this campaign, the film was successfully pre-sold and funds amounting to over $56,000 were raised, becoming one of the 100 most successful campaigns on Kickstarter and the most successful Canadian campaign on Kickstarter to date.

== See also ==
- The Apology, a 2016 documentary film by Hsiung about the experiences of three former comfort women
