= The Apology (2016 film) =

Documentary film by Tiffany Hsiung

- Directed by: Tiffany Hsiung
- Produced by: Anita Lee
- Cinematography: Tiffany Hsiung
- Edited by: Mary Stephen
- Music by: Lesley Barber
- Production company: National Film Board of Canada
- Release date: April 30, 2016 (Hot Docs)
- Running time: 104 minutes
- Country: Canada
- Language: English

The Apology is a 2016 documentary film by Tiffany Hsiung about three former "comfort women" who were among the 200,000 girls and young women kidnapped and forced into military sexual slavery by the Imperial Japanese Army during World War II. The film is produced by Anita Lee for the National Film Board of Canada.

Hsiung, who worked on the project for nearly a decade, has said that she encountered reluctance at times to re-opening such a painful topic: "One of the other challenges was speaking to villagers in China, for instance, who would not understand why I wanted to make a film on this topic. There is ongoing resistance to talking about atrocities because there is some shame about how they were even allowed to happen." She had also been concerned that her three elderly subjects might not live to see the finished film, during such a long production process.

== Synopsis ==
Some 70 years after their imprisonment in so-called "comfort stations", the three "grandmothers"—Grandma Gil in South Korea, Grandma Cao in China, and Grandma Adela in the Philippines—face their twilight years in fading health. After decades of living in silence and shame about their past, they know that time is running out to give a first-hand account of the truth and ensure that this horrific chapter of history is not forgotten.

As the film unfolds, their history and the struggles that have shaped them and continue to impact their lives come into view. Intimate scenes of daily routines and affectionate exchanges with friends and loved ones provide a glimpse into how they have managed to carry on despite their traumatic experiences. These moments also reveal the many complex choices the grandmothers have had to navigate throughout their lives—and continue to navigate—as survivors. It becomes painfully clear that the past lives on, along with the challenges the inheritors of their legacy will continue to face.

Gil Won-ok, or "Grandma Gil", as she is affectionately known among a well-established network of activists, has been attending weekly demonstrations in front of the Japanese embassy in Seoul for years. Despite her age and declining health, Grandma Gil remains a key spokesperson in the movement for an official apology from the Japanese government. Her exhausting travels eventually take her to the hallowed halls of the UN Human Rights Council in Geneva to deliver a petition with over a million signatures on behalf of her fellow survivors.

Grandma Cao lives in a remote village surrounded by mountains in rural China, where what happened to hundreds of local girls after they were kidnapped has long been an open secret among the old-timers. Fiercely independent, Grandma Cao insists on living alone despite the protests of her loyal daughter, who has been unaware of her mother's story. It is only when a historian requests her testimony of her experiences that Grandma Cao agrees to break decades of stoic silence about her painful past.

In Roxas City, Grandma Adela manages to find solace, camaraderie, and a sense of freedom as part of a support group for other survivors. Though she found love after the war, she carefully hid the truth about her past from her husband. Now widowed, she is wracked with feelings of guilt for not sharing her secret. She resolves to tell her children but remains unsure whether unburdening herself after all these years will make up for withholding the truth from the love of her life.

Whether they are seeking a formal apology from the Japanese government or summoning the courage to finally share their secret with loved ones, their resolve moves them forward as they seize this last chance to set future generations on a course for reconciliation, healing, and justice.

== Cast ==
The film features three former comfort women:

- Gil Won-ok
- Adela Reyes Barroquillo
- Cao Hei Mao

Activists Zhang Shuang Bing and Meehyang Yoon also appear in the film.

== Release ==
The Apology had its world premiere at the 2016 Hot Docs Canadian International Film Festival in Toronto. In October 2016, the film won the Busan Cinephile Award at the Busan International Film Festival's Vision Awards. The following month, it received the Audience Award at the 2016 Cork Film Festival. After airing on PBS in 2018, it then won a 2018 Peabody Award, presented at the 2019 awards ceremony.

== See also ==
- Within Every Woman, a related 2012 documentary by Hsiung on Japanese sexual war crimes in World War II
