= Homecoming women =

Korean term for comfort women

Homecoming women, also returning lady (Korean: 환향녀; Hanja: 還鄉女; RR: Hwanhyang Nyeo) is a term used to refer to Korean comfort women in the context of Korea's status as a tribute state of the Ming Dynasty and Qing Dynasty; as the imperial protectorate of Japan, and in South Korea under the post-colonial protection of the United States. The term is still used to configure and organise female promiscuity in contemporary South Korea. The term and its associated history is still inflammatory and controversial. It has spawned derivative terms that are still used as terms of disrespect and scorn.
