= Ama Museum =

Museum in Datong, Taipei, Taiwan

- 阿嬤家-和平與女性人權館
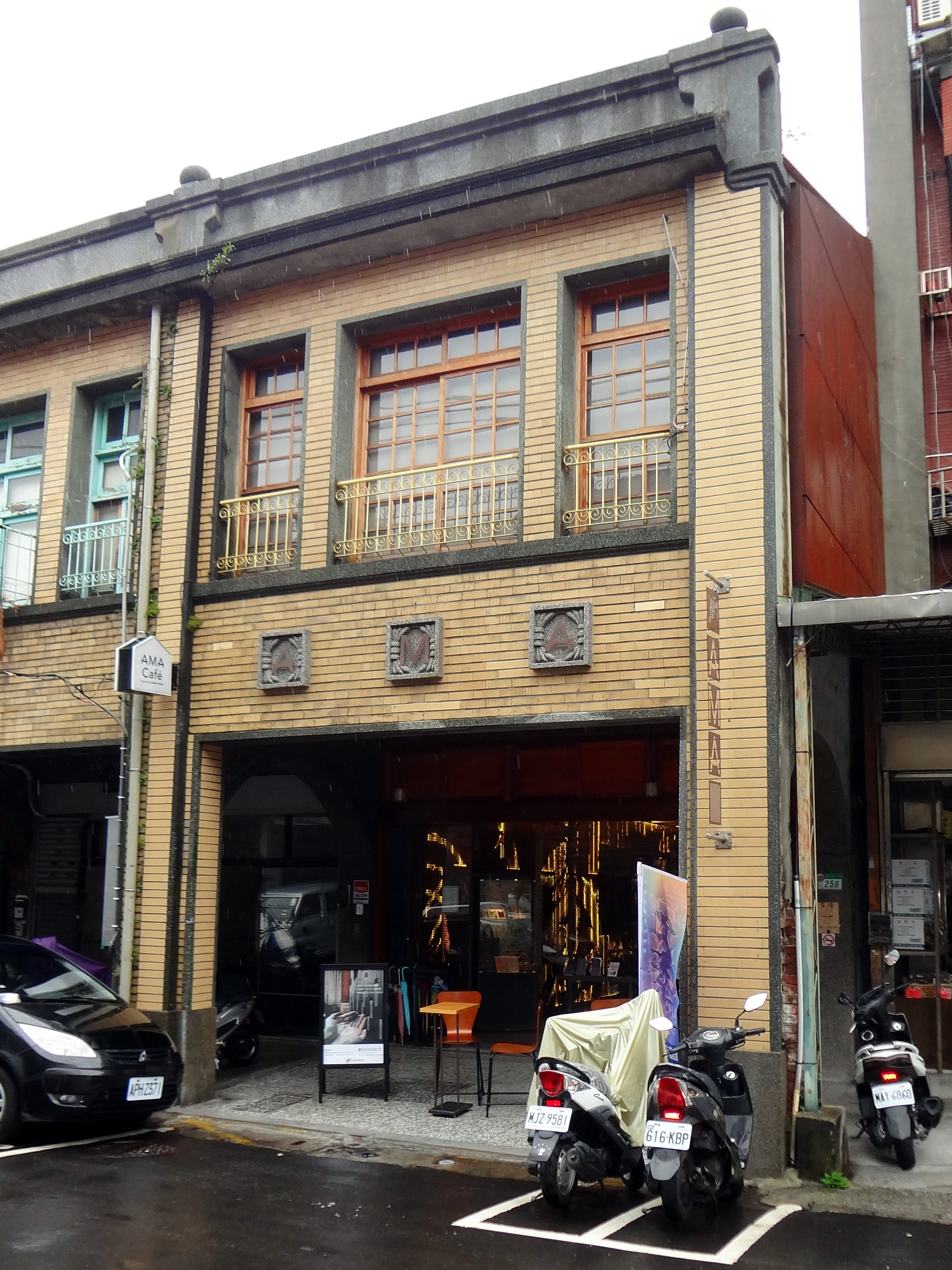
- The original location of the Ama Museum closed in November 2020.
- Established: 10 December 2016
- Location: Datong, Taipei, Taiwan
- Coordinates: 25°3′37.2″N 121°30′33.2″E
- Type: museum
- Public transit access: Minquan West Road metro station
- Website: Official website

The Ama Museum (traditional Chinese: 阿嬤家-和平與女性人權館; simplified Chinese: 阿嬷家-和平与女性人权馆; pinyin: Āmā Jiā-Hépíng Yǔ Nǚxìng Rénquán Guǎn) is a museum dedicated to comfort women in Taiwan. It opened in 2016, in Datong District, Taipei. The original location closed in November 2020, and the museum was relocated and reopened in April 2021 at 5F., No. 32, Sec. 3, Chengde Rd., Datong Dist., Taipei City, Taiwan (R.O.C.)

== Name ==
The museum is dedicated to those who were comfort women during the Japanese rule of Taiwan. Ama means grandmother in Taiwanese Hokkien, referring to the advanced age of those who had survived World War II.

== History ==
The original idea to establish the museum started in 2004. Supported by a large donation from the public in and outside Taiwan, as well as the Taipei Women's Rescue Foundation (TWRF), the museum plaque was unveiled in a ceremony on 8 March 2016 in conjunction with International Women's Day. The ceremony was attended by President Ma Ying-jeou and one former comfort woman.

The museum was finally opened on 10 December 2016 in a ceremony attended by Culture Minister Cheng Li-chun in conjunction with Human Rights Day and the 25th anniversary of the efforts made by the foundation towards comfort women. Speaking during the ceremony, Cheng urged people to never forget the past and to strive for better gender equality. The TWRF chair said that the museum would also be a place to promote gender equality and highlight the damages made by sexual abuse. The ceremony was also attended by one surviving Taiwanese comfort woman and advocates from Japan, South Korea and the United States.

The Taipei Women's Rescue Foundation announced in July 2020 that the Ama Museum would close in November 2020. The museum had operated at a loss since it opened in 2016, and the TWRF sold its offices in 2019 in an effort to keep the museum running. However, the COVID-19 pandemic reduced the museum's income further, leading to the decision to close it. In October 2020, the Taipei Women's Rescue Foundation began a fundraiser to move the Ama Museum, confirming that the original location would close on 10 November 2020. On 7 November 2020, the Taipei Women's Rescue Foundation released another statement on the fate of the Ama Museum, stating that its exhibits would move to an office building near Minquan West Road metro station, scheduled to open in April 2021.

== Architecture ==
The museum was originally housed in a renovated 90-year-old 2-story building with a total floor area of 495 m^{2}. The original location featured a café and workshop space.

== Exhibitions ==
At its original location, the museum permanently displayed photos, documents and videos related to Taiwanese comfort women. When it reopened, the museum planned to rotate exhibitions and introduce new ones.

== Activities ==
In its original location, the museum hosted various workshops and seminars on topics related to human rights. In August 2017, the museum launched a campaign to pressure the Government of Japan through the Japan–Taiwan Exchange Association to apologize and compensate the remaining comfort women.

== Transportation ==
The museum's original location was accessible within walking distance south west of Daqiaotou Station of Taipei Metro. Its new location will be an office building at 5F., No. 32, Sec. 3, Chengde Rd., Datong Dist., Taipei City, Taiwan (R.O.C.)

== See also ==
- List of museums in Taiwan
