= Yun Duk-min =

South Korean political scientist and ambassador

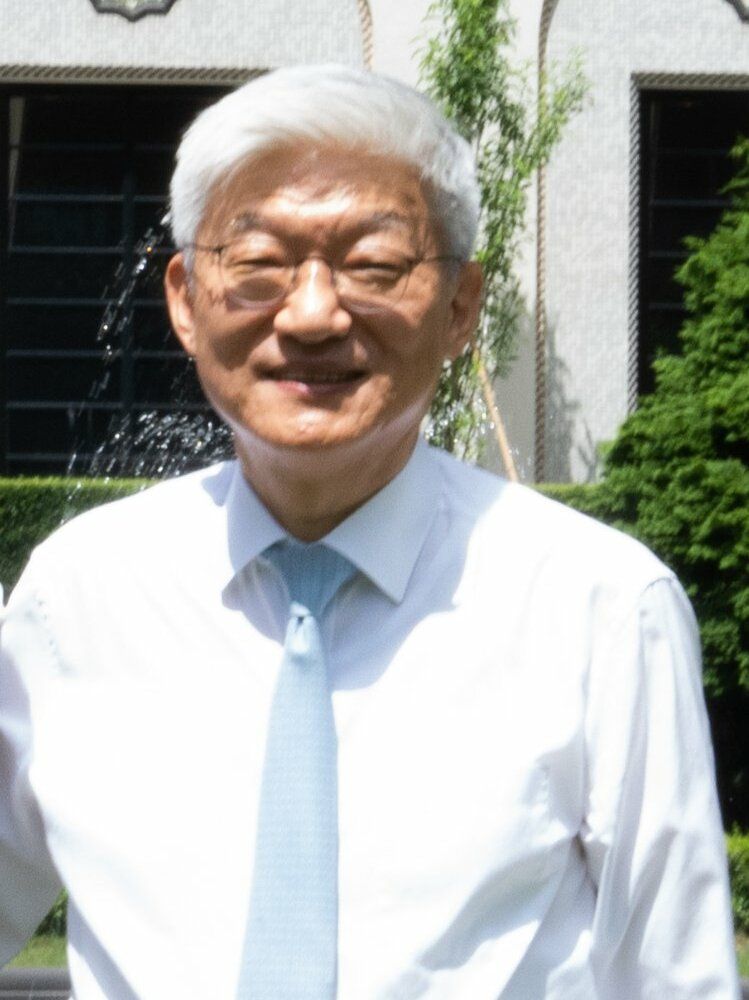
2022

Yun Duk-min (Korean: 윤덕민; Hanja: 尹德敏; born December 8, 1959) is a South Korean political scientist who is the former ambassador of South Korea to Japan. He was a former chancellor of the Korea National Diplomatic Academy.
