= Tokubetsu Keisatsutai =

Imperial Japanese Navy military police

The Tokkeitai (特警隊; short for 特別警察隊, Tokubetsu Keisatsutai; English: "Special Police Force", or Naval Secret Police) was the uniformed military police of the Imperial Japanese Navy (IJN), equivalent to the Kempeitai of the Imperial Japanese Army (IJA). The Tokkeitai also performed plainclothes and secret policing tasks as well as counterintelligence operations.

The original Tokkeitai was known as the General Affairs Section and concerned itself with general military policing and administrative work within the IJN: personnel, discipline and records. It took a more active role, partly to keep the Kempeitai and the IJA from meddling in IJN affairs.

It was especially active in the areas of the South Pacific and the Naval Control Area and was as pervasive as the Kempeitai. It had the same commissar roles in relation to exterior enemies or suspicious persons, and it watched inside units for possible defectors or traitors under the security doctrine of Kikosaku.

In addition to its military police responsibilities, it was the operative branch of the Secret Service Branch of the IJN (Information Office (情報局, Jōhō-kyoku)), which was responsible for counterintelligence, executive protection, some aspects of IJN force protection, recovering and analyzing information for the execution of undercover operations, and supporting ground combat operations (if necessary) alongside other IJN land forces. Its members also provided local security near naval bases alongside IJN "Guard" units. In the final weeks of the Pacific War, it was among the security units prepared for combat against the proposed Allied invaded mainland Japan in Operation Downfall.

== War crimes ==
Alongside IJA and other IJN units, Tokkeitai served as colonial police in some occupied Pacific areas. Later accusations of war crimes were made against them in that role for such acts as coercion of comfort women from Indonesia, Indochina and China into sexual slavery.

Colonel Frederic Borch, a United States Army attorney, historian, and author, asserts that the Tokkeitai were responsible for "widespread and almost daily commission of war crimes". In the post-war Dutch East Indies, military tribunals for Japanese personnel accused of war crimes and Dutch or Dutch East Indies citizens accused of collaboration held that the Tokkeitai was a "criminal group". As such, the Dutch applied the unique standard of "collectieve aansprakelijkheid" (English: lit. "collective liability") to members of the Tokkeitai. This standard asserted, in part:

"If a war crime is committed within the framework of the activities of a group of persons in such a way that the crime can be ascribed to that group as a whole, the crime shall be considered to have been committed by that group, and criminal proceedings taken against and sentences passed on all members of that group. [...] No penalty shall be imposed on the member for whom it is proved that he had taken no part in the commission of the war crime."

Unique among Western post-war tribunals, members of such "criminal groups" were obliged to prove their innocence.
