= Foundation of Japanese Honorary Debts =

Dutch NGO for WWII survivors

- Stichting Japanse Ereschulden (SJE)
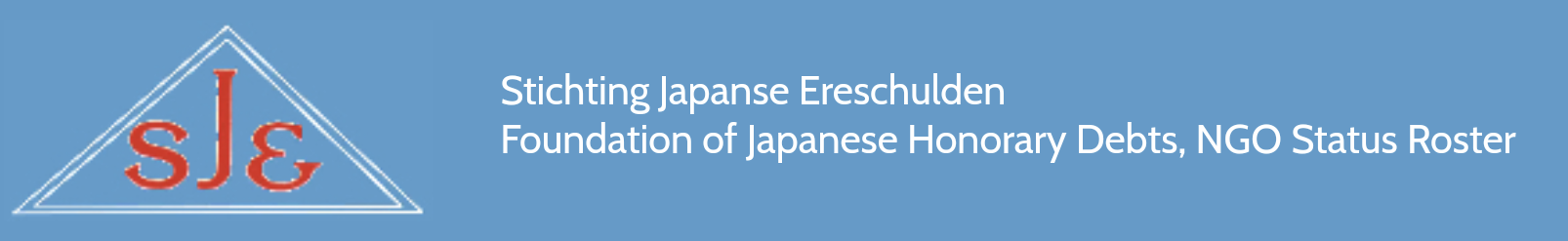
- Formation: 4 April 1990; 36 years ago
- Founder: Kees Stolk
- Type: NGO
- Legal status: Foundation
- Purpose: Advocacy group
- Location: The Hague, the Netherlands
- Chairperson: J.F. van Wagtendonk
- Website: www.japanse-ereschulden.nl

The Foundation of Japanese Honorary Debts (Dutch: Stichting Japanse Ereschulden, SJE) is an independent interest group in the Netherlands for those who incurred physical, mental and material damages inside and outside Japanese-run internment camps in the course of the Japanese occupation of the Dutch East Indies (present-day Indonesia) during World War II.

The SJE was founded on 4 April 1990 by former Burma Railway forced laborer Kees Stolk to demand recognition, apologies and final reparations from both Japan and the Netherlands. It received 76,000 damage claims. From 1990 on, the Japanese government has repeatedly rejected the claims on the basis of the 1951 Treaty of San Francisco and the 1956 Yoshida–Stikker Agreement between Japanese prime minister Shigeru Yoshida and Dutch foreign minister Dirk Stikker. According to the Japanese, the Dutch state has allegedly assumed sole responsibility for the victims' redress through these agreements.

The Foundation of Japanese Honorary Debts also advocates for recognition of and reparations for Dutch comfort women.

The SJE organizes monthly demonstrations at the Embassy of Japan in The Hague and provides statements at the annual sessions of the United Nations Human Rights Council in Geneva.

== See also ==
- Japan–Netherlands relations
- Japanese occupation of the Dutch East Indies
- Japanese war crimes
- Comfort women
