= Nuisance streamer =

Media term for disruptive or provocative livestreamers

Nuisance streamers is a term used by news media to describe livestreamers and online content creators who broadcast disruptive, provocative, confrontational or otherwise antisocial behaviour, particularly while producing IRL streaming content in public places. The term has been used especially in reporting about foreign livestreamers travelling in East and Southeast Asia, although similar behaviour occurs elsewhere.

Nuisance streaming generally involves livestreaming in public while deliberately provoking reactions from members of the public or authorities. The resulting encounters can become part of the entertainment being broadcast to viewers.

== History ==
=== Early IRL streaming ===
American streamer Ice Poseidon was among the prominent early IRL livestreamers. A 2018 profile in The New Yorker examined his livestreaming career, the financial incentives surrounding the medium and controversies resulting from his broadcasts.

The development of mobile livestreaming and platforms including Twitch, YouTube and Kick subsequently made it possible for creators to broadcast continuously from public locations.

== Japan ==
In Japan, it is term as Meiwaku-kei Haishinsha (迷惑系配信者; lit. 'nuisance-style streamers') or Meiwaku-kei YouTuber (迷惑系YouTuber; lit. 'nuisance-style YouTuber'). The country became one of the countries most closely associated with reporting about nuisance streamers.

In 2023, American livestreamer Johnny Somali attracted international attention after broadcasting provocative behaviour in Japan. The Japan Times reported incidents involving public transportation, confrontational behaviour and offensive references to historical events.

Somali was arrested in Osaka in 2023 after entering a construction site without permission. The trespassing case was later dropped, while he was fined ¥200,000 for obstructing business following an incident at a restaurant.

In 2024, YouTuber PewDiePie criticized disruptive streamers operating in Japan.

In February 2025, Japanese users circulated a "wanted" list identifying several livestreamers whom they considered nuisance streamers, reportedly including Johnny Somali and Ice Poseidon.

== South Korea ==
South Korea became a major focus of international coverage following Johnny Somali's activities in the country.

Somali travelled to South Korea in 2024 and continued producing provocative livestreams. One widely reported incident involved the Statue of Peace, a memorial associated with victims of sexual slavery during the Japanese occupation of Korea.

In April 2026, the Seoul Western District Court sentenced Somali to six months in prison. The Associated Press reported that he was convicted of multiple charges including obstruction of business and distributing fabricated sexually explicit content.

The court ordered his immediate detention following the verdict.

== Philippines ==
The Philippines became another focus of reporting about nuisance-style livestreaming in 2025.

Russian-American YouTuber Vitaly Zdorovetskiy was arrested in the Philippines in April 2025 following allegations that he had harassed members of the public while producing social-media content.

The Philippine government's Bureau of Immigration reported that Zdorovetskiy was arrested after being identified as an undesirable foreign national following viral social-media posts showing him harassing Filipinos in Bonifacio Global City.

Philstar.com reported that Zdorovetskiy was detained after his posts went viral and that he had also been seen harassing security guards and traffic personnel.

Manila Bulletin reported that Zdorovetskiy was arrested by the Criminal Investigation and Detection Group after being accused of harassing Filipinos for social-media content.

== Platform policies ==
Kick's community guidelines require users to comply with applicable laws and establish rules governing harmful and unlawful behaviour.

Johnny Somali, was removed from Twitch before continuing to broadcast on Kick.

== See also ==
- Trash stream
