= Trash stream =

Internet broadcast focused on extreme behavior

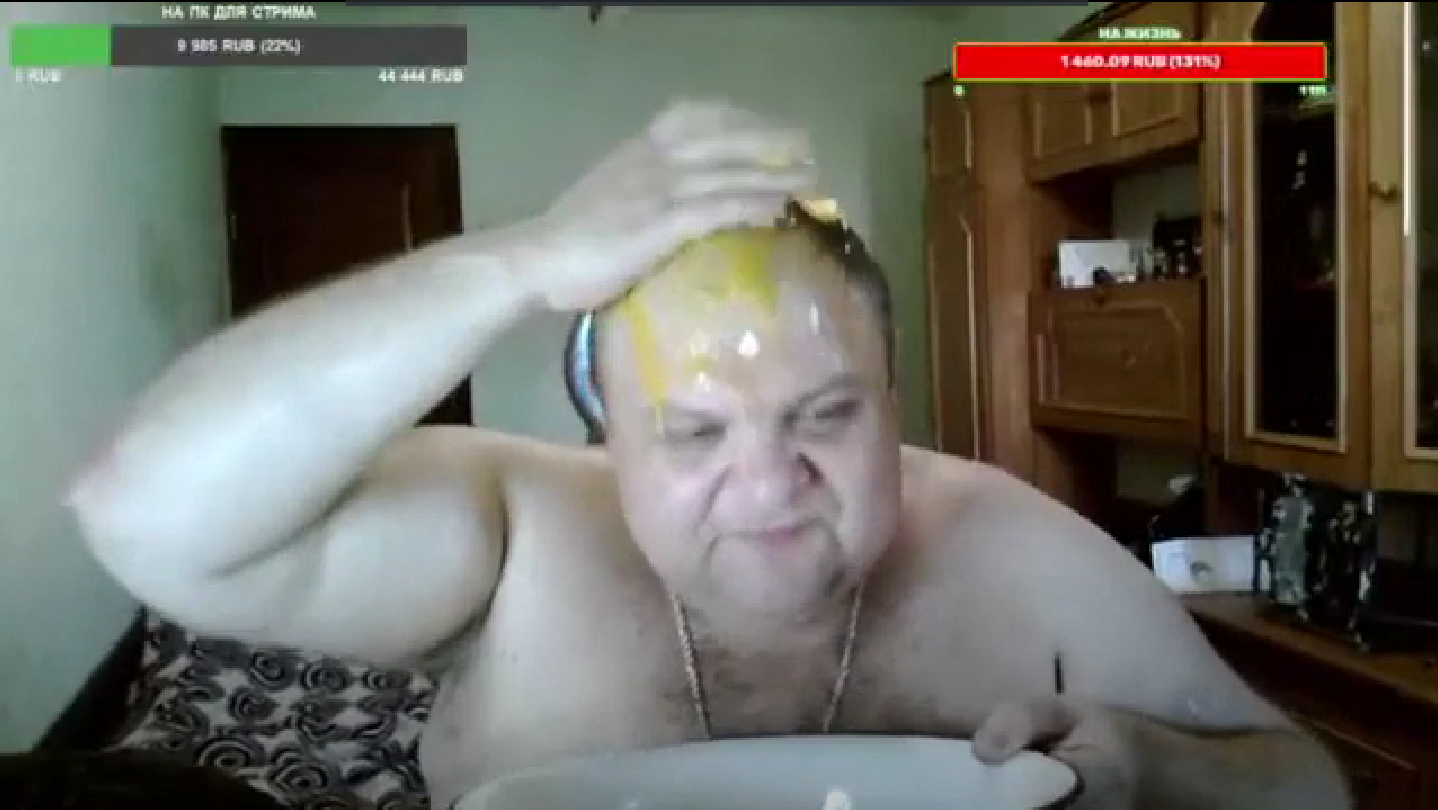
Example of a YouTube trashstream

A trashstream or trash stream is a kind of livestream in which the host engages in shocking, dangerous, humiliating or otherwise controversial actions, often involving themself or others. Those streams are typically monetized through viewer donations, often using services like DonationAlerts, and are primarily hosted on platforms such as YouTube.

Trashstreaming is popular mostly in Eastern European countries such as Russia and Ukraine, where the phenomenon is known as patostream (English: "pathostream", short for "pathological stream"); in Finland, where some incidents are also known to have occurred, it is called rappiostriimaus ("rotstream" or "degradation stream").

== Origins and development ==
The genre is believed to have originated in Russia in the early 2010s, with streamer Kirill Zyryanov (known as VJLink) regarded as a pioneer of the format. By the 2020s, trash streams had gained significant popularity in post-Soviet states, particularly among audiences seeking sensational or extreme content. One of the most infamous figures in the genre is Nikolay Belov, often referred to as the "King of Trash" for his particularly shocking and reckless live broadcasts.

== Controversies and legal issues ==
Trash streams have been the subject of significant controversy due to incidents involving physical harm or death during live broadcasts. Those events have led to administrative and criminal investigations against some trash streamers.

On July 30, 2024, Russia's State Duma passed legislation banning trash streams, citing public safety concerns and the negative societal impact of such content.

== Cultural context ==
The "Lower Internet", where trash streams typically thrive, encompasses online communities known for their edgy, often transgressive content. A notable example is the anonymous Russian imageboard Dvach, which serves as a hub for discussions and dissemination of niche webtrends.

== Incidents ==
=== VJLink ===
In February, 2021, VJLink (Kirill Zyryanov) conducted a livestream during which he humiliated a man named Eduard, who complained about being deprived of sleep. By the end of the stream, Eduard suffered an epileptic seizure due to fatigue and alcohol intoxication.

In December, 2021, a criminal case was initiated against Kirill for a stream where he chained a fellow streamer Maksim Moskalyov to a radiator, abused him, and threw firecrackers at him.

In February, 2022, outside of a stream, Kirill injured his girlfriend's head. She later started a stream asking for financial help, even as little as 50 Russian rubles.

=== Gobzavr and Lyudmuryk ===
Since 2016, blogger Andrey Yashin (also known as Gobzavr), along with his mother Lyudmila Yashina (known as Lyudmuryk), started streaming on YouTube. They drank alcohol and performed tasks for money, such as Andrey kissing his mother on the lips or smashing an egg on her head. Lyudmila often cursed viewers and feuded with fellow bloggers.

On December 1, 2019, Gobzavr beat his mother with a champagne bottle during a stream. In a subsequent video, he publicly apologized.

In February, 2023, on Yashina's birthday, a coffin with a pig's head inside was delivered to her apartment door.

In June of the same year, a recording of a phone conversation was leaked, in which Lyudmila admitted that her son regularly beat her outside of streams; hours later, she released a video denying these claims, but viewers noticed bruises on her arms poorly concealed with makeup. The incident was commented on by politician Ekaterina Mizulina, promising to take action against Andrey Yashin.

=== Mops Dyadya Pyos ===
In the summer of 2016, Ukrainian ex-prisoners Andrey Shchadylo and Sergey Novik (known as Mops Dyadya Pyos) started streaming, with Novik enduring humiliation and beatings from Shchadylo for viewer donations. On October 30, Novik defecated on a cake and attempted to send it to President Petro Poroshenko. In 2017, Shchadylo shot Mops in the head with a non-lethal gun for 50,000 rubles.

=== Shkilla Team ===
In December, 2021, two trash-streamers, Arkady Starikov and Ivan Filatov, were sentenced to respectively 2.6 and 2.3 years in a general regime colony for illegal actions during their streams in Bryansk.

=== "Deputy" Valentin Ganichev ===
In 2017, the channel owner of Tupa Splash, Vladislav "Demon" Pekonidi, started collaborating with "Deputy" Valentin Ganichev. In his streams, Demon intoxicated and abused Valentin.

In 2020, a trash-streamer from Bryansk kidnapped Valentin and forced him to participate in streams where he was beaten, humiliated, intoxicated, and buried alive. In February 2023, Valentin and trash-streamer Vladimir Samovolkin (alias "Pochta") were detained for expressing support for Ukraine during the Russian invasion on a stream. Valentin claimed he did it for a 1,000-ruble donation.

=== German Yagodka ===
At the beginning of March, 2019, trash-streamer German Yagodka (real name: Herman Aleksandrovich Vasilenko) uploaded a stream where he humiliated a veteran by urinating on him. Soon, on the sixth of that month, Yagodka was then located and detained by the St. Petersburg police.

On August 31, 2020, German Yagodka was beaten by a motorcyclist after he provocatively stepped onto the road while drunk, causing an accident.

On January 2, 2024, it was reported that a group of trash-streamers—including the aforementioned ones: VJLink, German Yagodka, and Vladislav Pekonidi—arrived in Thailand and immediately violated local laws on livestream, harassing locals, using obscene language, and making covert references to substances forbidden by local law (i.e., using slang to suggest he had drugs).

=== Mellstroy ===
On October 16, 2020, trash-streamer Andrey Burim (known as Mellstroy) assaulted model Elena Efremova during a stream, slamming her head against a table multiple times; on the 23rd, he was charged for assault. On July 9, 2021, Mellstroy was sentenced to six months of correctional labor, and the model's appeal against the court's decision was rejected.

=== Reeflay ===
On December 2, 2020, trash-streamer Stanislav Reshetnyak (alias "Reeflay") caused the offstream death of his girlfriend, Valentina "Genialnaya" Grigoryeva, by pouring cold water over her and then locking her outside, on the balcony, where she was left overnight in underwear only and eventually succumbed to hypothermia; he then streamed alongside her lifeless body on the sofa. It was initially reported that Grigoryeva had been pregnant at the time of her death; however, forensic examination proved such was not the case. Reshetnyak was detained, and an examination revealed that she had died from brain injury caused by a closed head trauma. In the following year, on April 27, Reshetnyak was sentenced to six years in a strict regime colony for "causing grievous bodily harm, resulting in death through negligence". He apologized to Grigoryeva's mother in court.

=== Jean Pormanove ===
Raphaël Graven, also known as Jean Pormanove or JP, was a 46-year-old French streamer, videographer and influencer who died on August 18, 2025, during a live broadcast on Kick.

As part of the contentious "Lokal" group's streams, Pormanove—the most popular French streamer on Kick—had been taking part in a livestream for more than 280 hours. He was criticized for provocations, humiliations, and obscenity in his content, which was well-known for its explosive, interactive tone and moments of rage. A December 2024 Mediapart investigation had already condemned his streams as "abuse business", claiming that vulnerable people were being subjected to humiliation for views and revenue.

Pormanove reportedly had trouble breathing during the broadcast just before he died. Owen "Naruto" Cenazandotti, one of the other participants, was informed by a donor that Pormanove seemed to be in a critical condition and had stopped showing signs of life. Cenazandotti slapped Pormanove in the face after hurling a water bottle at him to assess his condition. As soon as it became clear how serious the situation was, the livestream was cut off. A few hours later, Naruto made the death public on social media.

A third-party intervention was later ruled out by an autopsy, which suggested a cause of death of "medical or toxicological origin", despite ongoing complementary investigations. Before he died, Pormanove had complained to his mother that the idea of the "death game" had "kidnapped" him and he was "fed up". In a resurfaced video from the stream, Cenazandotti demands that Pormanove say on camera that his "shitty state of health and not [us]" would be the cause of his death.

== Commentary ==
=== Russia ===
In 2018, the first significant articles in Russia about trash streams began to appear. Meduza released an article where journalists studied the phenomenon, conversed with participants, and noted that the genre existed in different formats in other countries, citing Jackass as an example. On March 2, 2019, after an incident involving German Yagodka, Argumenty i Fakty warned readers that, unlike bloggers, trash-streamers were not involved in creativity but used explicit material to attract audiences, urging readers not to view their broadcasts.

On October 25, 2020, Moskovskij Komsomolets released an article about Mellstroy's case, urging for a legislative solution and intervention against trash streams.

On February 25, 2021, Rossiyskaya Gazeta published an article, "Legislation for Trash Streamers", detailing how to combat trash streams. On December 20, 2021, Yaroslavl Newspaper wrote an article about trash streams, highlighting the Mellstroy and Reeflay cases, describing trash streams as a blend of Jerry Springer Show and Big Brother, pointing out the lack of national television oversight, leading to extreme expressions for entertainment. On August 30, 2022, Dni.ru remarked that trash streams no longer brought the desired fame, and in their attempts to generate buzz, the genre led to numerous crimes.

=== Poland ===
Journalist Paulina Wilk attributed the popularity of patostreams amongst Polish teenagers to their transgressional nature, and compared it to reality television. Psychologist Zbigniew Nęcki said that patostream viewers are motivated by the aggression inherent to human nature.

== Research in Poland ==
Scholars Dominika Bek and Malwina Popiołek propose the following typology of patostreams:

- Alco-streaming: Livestreaming of alcohol abuse and drunken actions, also known as drunken streams.
- Violence broadcasting: Streaming of various types of violence, including physical violence (live beatings) and verbal violence (racist content, calls for violence, threats, insults, etc.).
- Sex-streaming or Sextreaming: Streaming situations involving various sexual deviations, including acts of pedophilia, among other extreme perversions.
- Daily trash-streaming: Broadcasting the everyday life of marginalized individuals, with a particular focus on so-called "fights".

== In popular culture ==
The 2020 American film Spree features a trash-streamer protagonist.

"Common People", a 2025 episode of the British television series Black Mirror, features a fictional trash-streaming platform named "Dum Dummies".

== See also ==
- Livestreamed crime
- Livestreamed suicide
- Lower Internet
- Mellstroy
- Nuisance streamer
  - Johnny Somali
- Sam Hyde's Fishtank Live
