= Kim Seo-kyung and Kim Eun-sung =

Korean sculptors

- Hangul: 김서경 & 김운성
- RR: Gim Seogyeong & Gim Unseong
- MR: Kim Sŏgyŏng & Kim Unsŏng

Kim Seo-kyung and Kim Eun-sung are a husband-and-wife team of Korean sculptors.

They are best known for the Statue of Peace. The statue was completed in 2011 and placed near the Japanese embassy in Seoul. It was just one of over 20 similar statues designed by the couple, most of which are located in Korea, with at least two in the USA.

In 2017 they announced plans to make another sculpture, this one named "Vietnam Pieta", and designed to commemorate victims of the massacres in the Vietnam War, allegedly perpetrated by Korean soldiers. The artists declared that just as Korean activists are using the Statue of Peace to pressure Japan, with the Statue of Peace and its replicas placed near numerous Japan embassies around the world, so should Korea be subject to similar pressure from Vietnam.

They have been married since 1990.
