= Peace Monument (disambiguation) =

Peace Monument is a monument at the United States Capitol in Washington, D.C.

Peace Monument may also refer to:

- Peace Monument (Atlanta), a monument at Piedmont Park in Atlanta.
- Peace Monument of Glendale, a monument in Glendale, California
- Peace Monument (Decatur, Indiana), a monument at the Adams County Courthouse in Decatur, Indiana.
- Peace Monument, New York, a statue by Antun Augustinčić in front of the United Nations General Assembly building in New York City.

== See also ==
- Watford Peace Memorial
