= Japan–South Korea Comfort Women Agreement =

2015 Japan–South Korea treaty

The Japan–South Korea Comfort Women Agreement declared that the issue of the comfort women between Japan and South Korea was to be resolved finally and irreversibly. The agreement was announced by the Foreign Ministers of both countries and confirmed by the Prime Minister of Japan and the President of South Korea by a telephone call on 28 December 2015. In 2019, the agreement had been effectively shelved.

== Background ==
An article of East Asia Forum reported that this agreement was pushed by the Obama administration.

== Announcement by Foreign Ministers at the Joint Press Occasion ==
Foreign Ministers of Japan and South Korea held a joint press conference at the Korea-Japan Foreign Ministers' Meeting on 28 December 2015.

=== Statement by Japanese Foreign Minister Kishida ===
The Government of Japan and the Government of the Republic of Korea (ROK) have intensively discussed the issue of comfort women between Japan and the ROK at bilateral meetings including the Director-General consultations. Based on the result of such discussions, I, on behalf of the Government of Japan, state the following:

(1) The issue of comfort women, with an involvement of the Japanese military authorities at that time, was a grave affront to the honor and dignity of large numbers of women, and the Government of Japan is painfully aware of responsibilities from this perspective. As Prime Minister of Japan, Prime Minister Abe expresses anew his most sincere apologies and remorse to all the women who underwent immeasurable and painful experiences and suffered incurable physical and psychological wounds as comfort women.

(2) The Government of Japan has been sincerely dealing with this issue. Building on such experience, the Government of Japan will now take measures to heal psychological wounds of all former comfort women through its budget. To be more specific, it has been decided that the Government of the ROK establish a foundation for the purpose of providing support for the former comfort women, that its funds be contributed by the Government of Japan as a one-time contribution through its budget, and that projects for recovering the honor and dignity and healing the psychological wounds of all former comfort women be carried out under the cooperation between the Government of Japan and the Government of the ROK.

(3) While stating the above, the Government of Japan confirms that this issue is resolved finally and irreversibly with this announcement, on the premise that the Government will steadily implement the measures specified in (2) above. In addition, together with the Government of the ROK, the Government of Japan will refrain from accusing or criticizing each other regarding this issue in the international community, including at the United Nations.

— Fumio Kishida, Minister for Foreign Affairs of Japan

=== Statement by South Korean Foreign Minister Yun ===
The Government of the Republic of Korea (ROK) and the Government of Japan have intensively discussed the issue of comfort women between the ROK and Japan at bilateral meetings including the Director-General consultations. Based on the result of such discussions, I, on behalf of the Government of the ROK, state the following:

(1) The Government of the ROK values the GOJ's announcement and efforts made by the Government of Japan in the lead-up to the issuance of the announcement and confirms, together with the GOJ, that the issue is resolved finally and irreversibly with this announcement, on the premise that the Government of Japan will steadily implement the measures specified in 1. (2) above. The Government of the ROK will cooperate in the implementation of the Government of Japan's measures.

(2) The Government of the ROK acknowledges the fact that the Government of Japan is concerned about the statue built in front of the Embassy of Japan in Seoul from the viewpoint of preventing any disturbance of the peace of the mission or impairment of its dignity, and will strive to solve this issue in an appropriate manner through taking measures such as consulting with related organizations about possible ways of addressing this issue.

(3) The Government of the ROK, together with the Government of Japan, will refrain from accusing or criticizing each other regarding this issue in the international community, including at the United Nations, on the premise that the Government of Japan will steadily implement the measures it announced.

— Yun Byung-se, Foreign Affairs Minister of South Korea

== Summit telephone call ==
In the evening of the announcement by Foreign Ministers, Prime Minister of Japan Shinzo Abe and President of South Korea Park Geun-hye held talks via telephone and confirmed the agreement made by Foreign Ministers.

== Foundation ==
A foundation was set up in South Korea under the agreement. Japan provided 1 billion yen to the foundation.

Of the 47 women who were alive when the agreement was reached, 36 wanted to receive cash payments and 34 of them went on to receive about 10 million yen each.

== Reactions ==
Immediately after the announcement, U.S. Secretary of State John Kerry welcomed the agreement saying " We believe this agreement will promote healing and help to improve relations between two of the United States' most important allies. We applaud the leaders of Japan and the Republic of Korea for having the courage and vision to reach this agreement, and we call on the international community to support it."

== Demise of the agreement ==
After the erection of a second Comfort Women Statue in Busan by a local civic group in 2017, the Japanese government took the new statue as a "breach of the agreement since it required official approval". The Japanese government proceeded then to stop economical negotiations with Korea at the time. As a following, due to this diplomatic incident, and low public support, especially in South Korea, the agreement was starting to fall apart by 2017.

In 2019, the President Moon Jae-in administration dissolved the foundation, effectively annulling the agreement.
