= Seo Kyoung-Duk =

South Korean social activist (born 1974)

- 서경덕 徐坰德
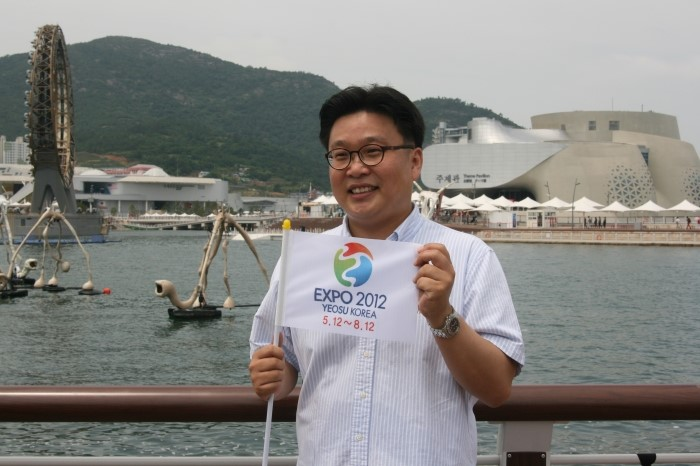
- Born: 1974 (age 51–52); Seoul, South Korea

Academic background
- Education: Korea University (PhD)

Academic work
- Institutions: Sungshin University

Seo Kyoung-Duk (Korean: 서경덕; Hanja:徐坰德, born 25 May 1974) is a South Korean social activist. He is a counselor at the Presidential Council on Nation Branding, a professor in Sungshin University, and the creator of ‘Dokdo School’ (Korean: 독도학교; Hanja: 獨島學校), an educational institution with a strong patriotic orientation. Professor Seo criticizes Japan on comfort women and Liancourt Rocks disputes and actively involves in Sino-Korean cultural disputes.

In 2021, he placed an ad in The New York Times, saying that "Korea's Kimchi, It's for Everyone.".

In 2025, called for a strong sentence against streamer Johnny Somali, who was on trial in South Korea to discourage others from engaging in similar behavior.
