= Pasha Technique =

Russian musician and music producer (1984–2025)

Pasha Technique Паша Техник
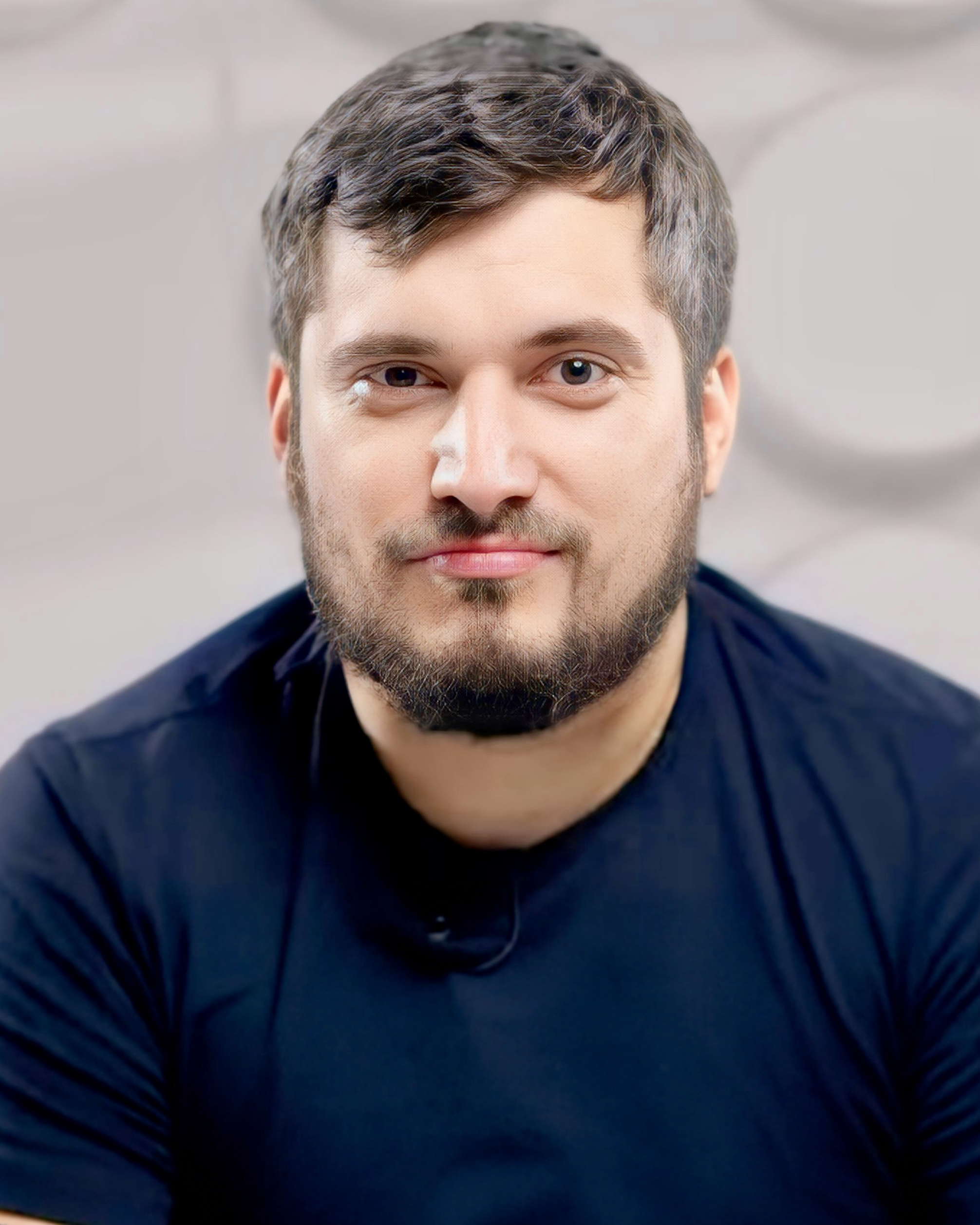
- Technique in 2019

Background information
- Also known as: Pasha Technique
- Born: Pavel Nikolaevich Ivlev; 1 July 1984; Moscow, Russian SFSR, USSR
- Died: 5 April 2025 (aged 40) Phuket province, Thailand
- Occupations: Rapper; record producer; DJ; blogger
- Spouse: Karina Melnichuk (2015–2023)

Pavel Nikolayevich Ivlev (1 July 1984 – 5 April 2025), known by his stage name Pasha Technique (Russian: Паша Техник, romanized: Pasha Tekhnik), was a Russian hip-hop artist and music producer.

Ivlev was a founder of the group Kunteynir and was known for his provocative work and behavior. Among the main themes of his work were drug addiction, nationalism, and black comedy. He was referred to as one of the most significant rappers in Russia's underground hip-hop scene. In 2010, Pitchfork published an article about the Moscow electronic scene, where the Kunteynir was called an "underground legend" and the album Five Years a masterpiece. Former editor of The Flow and Rap.ru Nikolai Redkin described Technique of the mid-2000s as "a well-heard, very erudite music lover who dug new music and was well versed in non-mainstream hip-hop."

From the late 2010s, he gained media popularity and appeared in numerous internet shows, with quotes from these becoming memes.

== Early life ==
Ivlev was born on 1 July 1984 in Moscow. His mother worked as an accountant and his father worked as a trade agent. The family lived in the Lefortovo district. During his school years he took part in swimming competitions, where he took first places despite his full weight. He attended art school, taekwondo and basketball. He graduated as a translator from the Institute of Economics and Culture, according to his own statement - for bribes.

While still at school, he started listening to Russian hip-hop and, in particular, the rap groups Bad Balance, D.O.B., and Slaves of the Lamp. In 2000, he bought audio cassettes with rap records in the office of the RAP Recordz label, which was located in a basement on Tagansky District. The nickname Technique appeared after the musician registered under the nickname technique on the popular rap forum hip-hop.ru in 2002.

== Career ==
=== Kunteynir (2002–2008, 2013–2016) ===
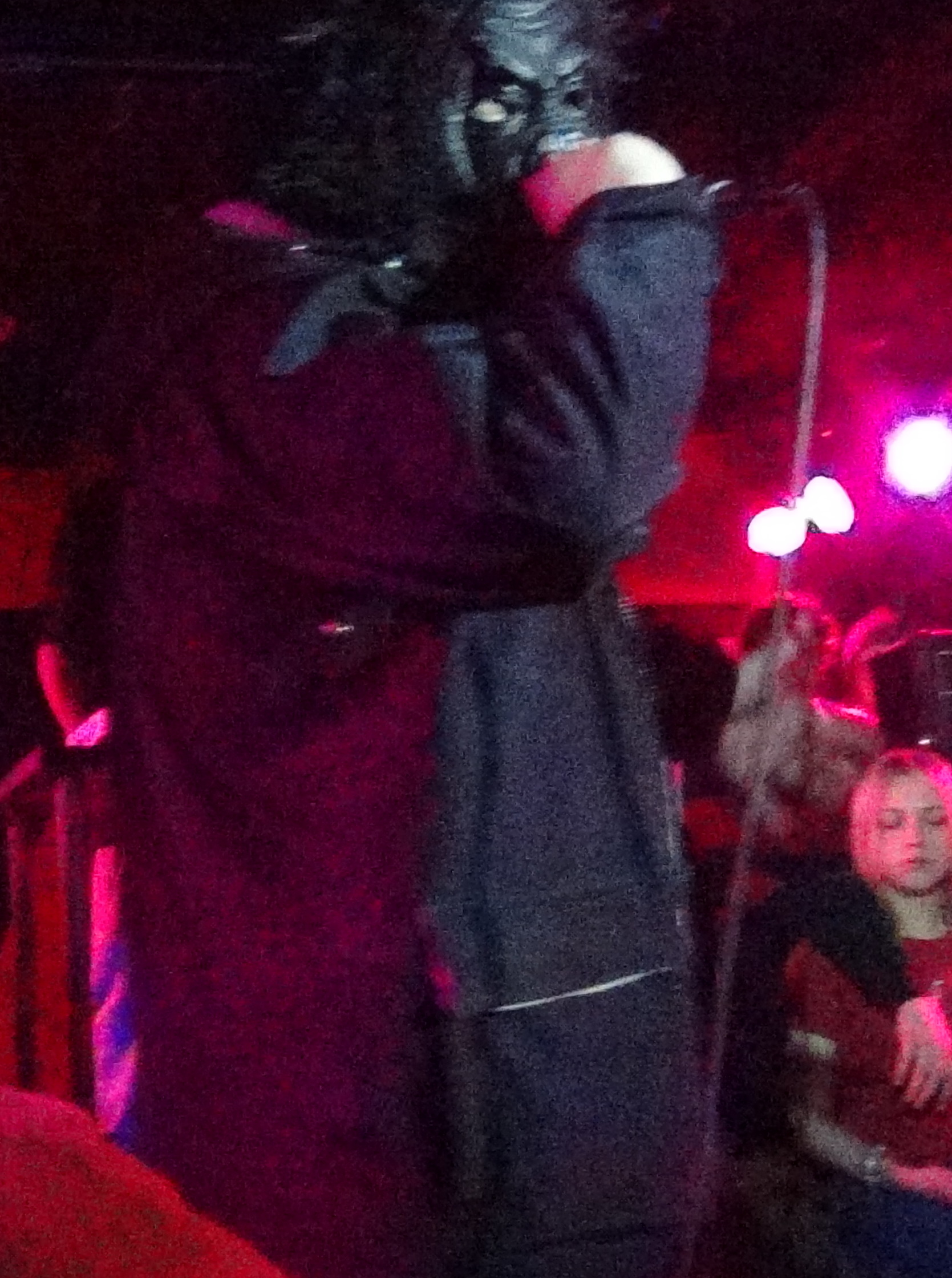
Pasha Technique performing in a gorilla mask in 2015

In 2002, along with rapper MC Smeshnoy, he created the rap group Kunteynir. In 2003, Technique began to master the music writing software Fruity Loops. Kunteynir's debut performance took place at the presentation of the group's album Smoke Curtain in the Moscow club Downtown on 29 April 2004, where the duo performed as a warm-up act and was received coldly by the audience. It was at this event that Pasha Technique first went on stage wearing a gorilla mask, which became his stage appearance until the start of his solo career.

On 4 June 2004, the RAP Recordz label released the duo's debut album Edward Scissorpaperhands. The album was recorded at home. All lyrics were written by Technique, and the music was created by beatmaker Radj from Canadian emigre rap group DaBro. The album had a print run of 500 copies. The cover of the disc was printed on expensive cardboard for business cards and depicted a pink stamp. According to Nikolai Redkin, musically it is "underground boom bap with the hiss of vinyl", "absurd funny rap". After the release of the album MC Smeshnoy left the project and Pasha Technique was joined by MC Blyov.

In 2008, Kunteynir broke up due to Technique's prison sentence for drug possession and distribution, but reformed after his release in 2013. On 15 July 2013, Studio Soyuz released the album 5 Years on CD, and on 9 June 2014, the band's sixth album, Basis, was released.

On 18 May 2014, Pasha Technique took part in the internet show Versus Battle, during which he held a rap battle against St. Petersburg rapper Brol. During the battle, Technique took off his trousers and showed the audience his penis through his underwear, which caused a negative reaction from the audience. In the end, Brol won, but this performance laid the foundation for Technique's future Internet popularity.

In 2015, Technique recorded several solo and collaborative tracks. In 2016 Kunteynir released a mini-album The Last Record, after which the band broke up.

=== Solo career (2017–2025) ===
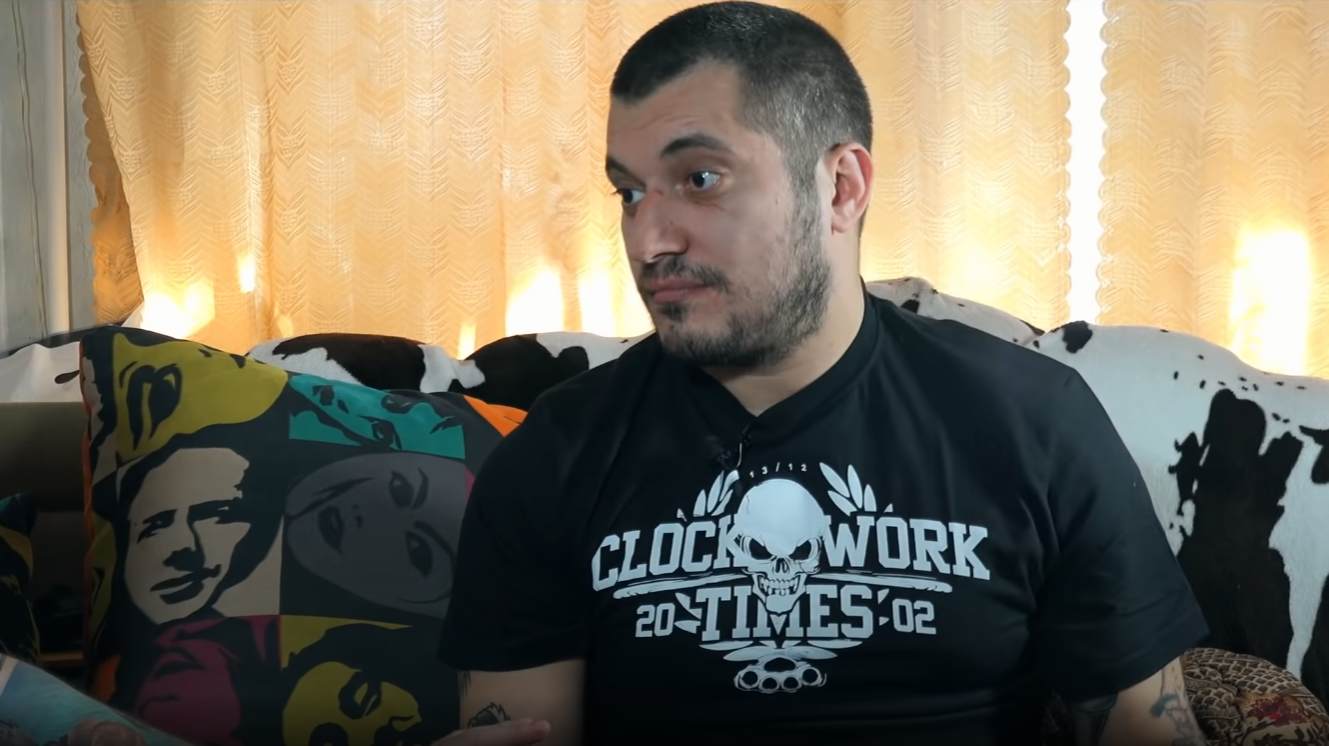
Pasha Technique in 2018

In 2017, he released a double solo album, Statistics of the Goose, and two "Buckwheat" and "Need Xanax" videos.

In 2018, publisher Molot Comics released a series of comic books about the fictional life of Pasha Technique He also launched his own show on YouTube called In Search of Easy Money, recorded an album called Ru$$ian Tre$hmvn, and made his film debut in Igor Belyaev's Lost in the Dark.

In 2019, he recorded a collaborative mini-album with Conductor MC Freckles. On April 20 of the same year, Pasha Technique defeated Mikhail Vakhneev in a pro-wrestling match on the Independent Wrestling Federation's show High Stakes. He also performed at the "#Sasha Skool Cure" benefit concert in support of Sasha Skool, who at the time had cancer, and worked one match as the mascot of FC Krylya Sovetov.

In 2020 he released the album In the Blood, recorded with LuckyProduction.

From 2021, he produced his own energy drink, Zaryazhenka. He also owned a bar in the centre of Moscow called Technique Pub.

In 2022, the album Boiling Pot was released. In the summer of 2022, participated in the MMA project Arena, where he fought against rapper Uncle JI. On 11 October, he joined the media football club GOATS, but on 24 October, he was expelled from the club for unsportsmanlike conduct.

=== Internet popularity ===
Pasha Technique's speeches were rife with profanity. Since the second half of the 2010s, he had been a guest on a number of internet shows, with quotes from these shows becoming memes and catchphrases on the Russian-language Internet: "there's a fuckload of humanity in me", "oldtimer, get the fuck out of here", "I think you're mixed up", and others. His quote, "Let's fucking think, give me a fucking clue, why are you fuckin' with me? How to make it beautiful, for fuck's sake", got a big response with millions of views.

== Personal life ==
He met Karina Melnichuk (born 1994) in 2012, and the two were married in 2015. In 2019, their son Ivan was born. They divorced in 2023 due to Ivlev's drug addiction and cheating.

From early 2025 until his death, Ivlev was dating an escort known as Christina Lexi.

Ivlev was part of the football hooligans, attending FC Dynamo Moscow matches.

=== Drug addiction ===
Pavel Ivlev suffered from drug addiction since the age of 14. He regularly appeared in a state of drug intoxication at various interviews and openly spoke about addiction. According to him, active addiction began in 2013, after he was released from the prison. Since 2015, he had actively abused Xanax.

I haven't injected anything, but I've tried everything.

— Pasha Technique, on his drug addiction

On 11 November 2021, Ivlev was forcibly sent to rehab for two months. On 7 October 2022, he fell into a coma due to abuse of narcotic drugs. On 8 October he regained consciousness and was discharged from the hospital the same day. On 6 November of the same year, he fainted twice and was again sent to the rehab.

== Prison sentences ==
In 2008, he was arrested on charges of drug possession and distribution. In 2009, he was sentenced to five years' imprisonment in a high-security colony, serving his sentence in the Republic of Karelia. He continued his drug use in prison. He was released from prison in 2013.

In December 2019, Ivlev's driving licence was revoked for one year and seven months, and he was fined 30,000 roubles for an accident while under the influence of alcohol. On 17 June 2020, he was arrested in Balashikha for driving while intoxicated for the second time; in September 2020, he was sentenced to 11 months' imprisonment and banned from driving for two years. On 23 August 2021, he was released from prison.

On 7 July 2023, Ivlev was arrested for 13 days for displaying Nazi symbols: the performer had a tattoo on his arm depicting the cartoon character Karlsson-on-the-Roof with a swastika-shaped propeller.

== Death ==
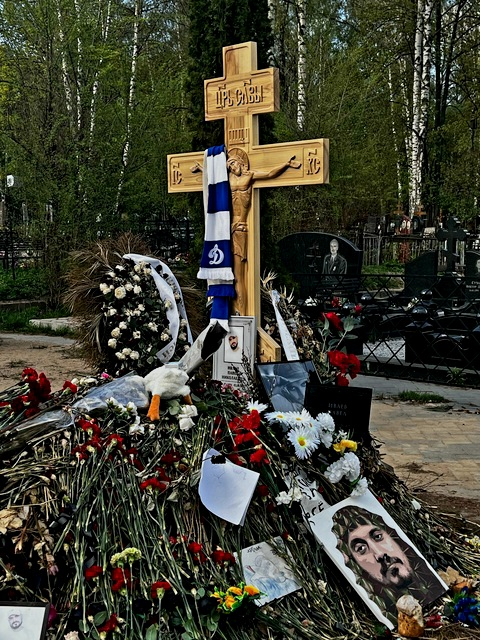

On 27 March, Ivlev was hospitalized in Phuket, Thailand, where he was placed in a medically induced coma and connected to a ventilator and an ECMO machine. He was diagnosed with pneumonia, sepsis, multiple organ dysfunction syndrome, and acute respiratory distress syndrome. He appeared to have been poisoned, allegedly by illegal substances, though a test showed no drugs in his blood. According to his ex-spouse, Ivlev used codeine mixed with ketamine, although the day before he had been treated from opiates. She claimed that he choked on vomit, which gave him bacterial pneumonia. On 28 March, Ivlev's lungs stopped functioning, and he began having heart problems. On 31 March, a specialist from the Institute of Sklifosovsky went to Thailand. It was noted that pneumonia had damaged almost all of the rapper's lungs. On 1 April, it became known that streamer Mellstroy transferred five million rubles for Ivlev's treatment. Also raising funds for treatment was the Survivor Project. On 4 April, Ivlev experienced clinical death, and although he was resuscitated, his condition worsened, including a pneumothorax. The rapper's entourage planned to transport him to a hospital in Bangkok, but he could not be transported because it was not known whether he was brain-dead. The Russian Consulate General in Phuket confirmed a death date of 5 April, with the cause of death listed as septic shock. The death certificate also states that the rapper had advanced lung cancer.

On 9 April, Ivlev's body was brought to Moscow by plane from Phuket. On 11 April, a funeral service was held at the Peter and Paul Church in Lefortovo, after which he was buried at the Nikolo-Arkhangelsky Cemetery in Balashikha, Moscow Oblast.
