= Mellstroy =

Belarusian streamer and blogger (born 1998)

- Born: Andrey Burim; 15 December 1998 (age 27); Gomel, Belarus
- Occupations: Streamer; blogger; entrepreneur
- Years active: 2016–present

Instagram information
- Page: MELLSTROY
- Years active: 2016–present
- Followers: 3.4 million

Kick information
- Channel: Mellstroy987
- Years active: 2023–present
- Followers: 1 million

TikTok information
- Page: mellstroy
- Years active: 2020–present
- Followers: 5.5 million
- Last updated: 1st November 2026
- Website: mellstroy.game

Andrey Alyaksandravich Burim (Note: Russian: Андрей Александрович Бурим; Belarusian: Андрэй Аляксандравіч Бурым, romanized: Andrej Alaksandravič Bury̆m; Belarusian pronunciation: [anˈdrɛj aʎaˈksandravʲit͡ʂ buˈrɨm]) (born December 15, 1998), commonly known by his online alias Mellstroy, is a Belarusian internet personality. His popularity is mainly attributed to provocative and highly controversial actions undertaken by Burim on his trash livestreams held on Twitch and Kick platforms. In March 2024, he set a new record in the post-Soviet states for the highest number of concurrent viewers on a live stream, reaching over 720,000 viewers.

He first gained widespread recognition in 2020 during his live broadcasts from the Moscow-City complex. He experienced a second wave of popularity in 2024 by organizing large-scale contests on social media, in which he offered rewards for subscriptions, videos about him, and video greetings from athletes, media personalities, and celebrities. Since 2024, he has actively engaged in charitable activities. In 2025, an online casino was launched using Mellstroy's alias; however, the following year the streamer himself denied all alleged connections to the project and stated that his name was only used for its promotion.

== Early life and education ==
Andrey Burim was born on December 15, 1998, in Gomel, Belarus, into a working-class family. His father worked at a factory, and his mother was a kiosk saleswoman. During his childhood, their family faced financial difficulties, which forced Andrey to wear second-hand clothes passed from his older brother named Sergey.

In August 2024, he gave a three-hour interview to the project Vpiska, stating that he had been interested in making money online since childhood. According to Burim, around the age of 12, he created Minecraft game servers and tried his hand at trading. The blogger noted that, at first, his hobby was not supported by his family — his father was skeptical about such activities. However, family attitude towards his work changed after Andrey earned his first US$100 online.

After some time, he stopped his Minecraft activities and began playing Dota 2, where he engaged in trading in-game items. Later, he temporarily suspended his online presence. After completing nine or ten grades of school, Andrey enrolled in a vocational school to study electromechanics, but quickly dropped out of studies. According to Burim's recollections, he occasionally experienced bullying during his short time in college, but he never provoked conflicts himself.

== Internet career ==
=== 2016—2019: Beginning of streaming career ===
Shortly after dropping out, Mellstroy began creating gaming content on YouTube. He started with publishing Let's Play videos on Minecraft, Dota 2, and Counter-Strike: Global Offensive. This type of content did not bring him widespread recognition, and he later changed the format, focusing on live streaming of routine activities and interacting with the viewers.

To gather an audience and attract subscribers, Mellstroy began incorporating provocative, humiliating, and often cruel elements into his live broadcasts. During his streams, Burim and the participants performed potentially dangerous, risky, and harmful to health actions, such as spraying human body with urine and consuming excessive amounts of alcohol. He hosted online sessions on Skype and Chatroulette with female participants and encouraged them to perform various provocative actions, such as undressing on camera, while broadcasting the footage on YouTube. In exchange, he offered them cash rewards, promised promotion on social media and publicity for their profiles. After some time, the blogger started receiving advertising offers from online casinos, prize giveaways, and other promotions. By 2017, local Belarusian police confiscated Andrey's computer for forensic analysis, since his streams allegedly involved underage girls and illegal substances, and his Youtube channel with 50,000 subscribers was deleted.

=== 2020: First rise to fame ===
In 2020, Burim moved to Moscow and rented an apartment in the well-known Moscow-City complex to expand the scale and quality of his so-called "streams". Following the rise in popularity of Mellstroy’s streams, he began receiving collaboration offers from online casinos. Mellstroy actively promoted their advertisements, which drew criticism from other bloggers. During his broadcasts, he repeatedly admitted that the main sources of his multimillion-dollar income were advertising and affiliate programs of online casinos.

During the COVID-19 pandemic, IRL streamers gained widespread popularity on Twitch platform. Instead of playing video games, they broadcast their daily routine and interacted with audiences, creating a sense of presence during lockdowns. This type of streams and associated controversial activities have brought Mellstroy his greatest popularity. He hosted multi-hour broadcasts from his apartment in the Moscow-City complex, inviting internet personalities such as Edward Bil, Ruki-Bazuiki (Kirill Tereshin), Grisha Polnoe TV (Grigoriy Chistyakov), and VJLink (Kirill Zyryanov), as well as numerous other guests, organizing drunken fights, anti-social, often humiliating and cruel challenges with cash rewards. Zyryanov once joined Burim for a week-long trash-stream with all-inclusive food and alcohol from a rented house in St. Petersburg. By mid-2020, Mellstroy had gathered a 500,000 viewer audience. The atmosphere at Mellstroy’s parties was described by Yury Khovansky as the likes of "[Russian] Great Gatsby who had decisively gone mad with money".

=== 2021—2022: Decline in popularity ===
In October 2020, during a livestream from Moscow, Mellstroy assaulted an instagram model named Alyona Yefremova by grabbing her and hitting her head twice against the table desk. This incident drew attention from several popular bloggers with multimillion audiences, who criticized Mellstroy for his actions. Among them were Nikolay Sobolev, Ruslan Usachev, and Dmitry Larin. Mellstroy himself stated: "Yes, I am guilty. I must face an appropriate punishment strictly within the framework of the law." (Note: Да, виноват. Я должен понести адекватное наказание исключительно в рамках закона.) Immediately after the incident, Mellstroy’s YouTube channel was blocked. Burim also stated that online casinos had refused to collaborate with him due to the active criminal prosecution opened against him; however, Mellstroy continued to host gaming streams by creating temporary channels, which were soon taken down.

In July 2021, the Presnensky District Court of Moscow sentenced blogger Andrey Burim to six months of corrective labor. The court also ordered him to pay 22,444 rubles to cover the victim’s medical expenses and 50,000 as compensation for moral damages. In September 2022, Mellstroy transferred US$17,000 (equivalent to $20,198 in 2025) to Yury Khovansky to help him purchase an apartment in Serbia. Khovansky thanked Burim for assistance and stated that he now had enough money to buy the apartment, and that he had “completely changed his opinion of Mellstroy.” Earlier in 2021, Khovansky proposed banning his streams in Russia. During this period, Mellstroy frequently mentioned having multimillion debts, which he attempted to repay through gambling winnings. He rarely hosted house-party streams and announced his return in November 2022.

=== 2023: Comeback ===
In December 2022, Mellstroy held a comeback broadcast in his signature manner titled "The Return of Friends". He rented a house with service staff for 4 million and raffled off a Maybach car, won by a viewer who had donated about 2 million (with the car itself valued at 11 million). Burim had apparently reconciled with Alyona Yefremova, who appeared on stream and took part in a dare roulette.

In January 2023, Mellstroy left Russia for the United Arab Emirates and spent some time living in Dubai. Over the following months, the blogger stayed in Bali, Mauritius, and the Seychelles, before returning to Dubai. The same month he moved to stream on the Kick platform. The streamer was permanently banned from Twitch and Trovo for promoting online casinos based on an appeal by the head of the Safe Internet League Ekaterina Mizulina, along with other personalities including Egor Kreed, Maddyson, Buster, PLOHOYPAREN, and Kudes. Mellstroy also stated that he had “pulled himself together”, stopped drinking alcohol, and repaid debts totaling 130 million.

In the summer of 2023, Mellstroy drew public attention by sending large monetary donations to popular Russian Internet streamers, offering them to complete various challenges, including shaving their heads live on stream. The amounts ranged from several hundred thousand to several million Russian rubles. Over the course of several weeks, Mellstroy “had dozens of the biggest Runet streamers shave their heads”. He donated 500,000 to Restorator, 2 million to Kussia, 4 million to Strogo, and 5 million to JesusAVGN. He also attempted to persuade streamer Papich to return to playing Dota 2 for 1 million; Papich had not played the game since 2019. In total, Mellstroy donated nearly 10 million rubles over the span of five days.

=== 2024–present: Second wave of popularity ===
In February 2024 Mellstroy relocated to Turkey due to a new criminal case opened against him in the United Arab Emirates, and paused hosting livestreams. He then attracted attention by challenging viewers to earn money by creating content about him on TikTok, Reels, or YouTube Shorts, rewarding one million views with 200 dollars. As a result, users began to massively publish memes featuring Mellstroy, which once again made him a viral figure. As of March 2024, the blogger had allegedly paid out more than US$1 million for videos featuring him.

In late February 2024, Mellstroy launched a contest with large promised cash rewards — up to tens of millions of rubles — for video greetings or subscriptions to his accounts from internationally known bloggers, celebrities, and athletes. A video greeting from football players such as Lionel Messi, Cristiano Ronaldo, Kylian Mbappé, or Erling Haaland was valued at around 30 million Russian rubles. A similar amount was offered for a subscription from bloggers Logan Paul, IShowSpeed, KSI, or Khaby Lame, as well as for running across the field during the UEFA Champions League final with the Mellstroy logo painted on one’s body. A photo featuring his nickname at the summit of Mount Everest was rewarded with 45 million rubles, while writing his nickname on the Moon was promised a payment of 1 billion rubles.

The highest rewards – 37.5 million rubles for a video greeting and 150 million rubles for a subscription – were set for the blogger MrBeast. The total prize pool of the contest amounted to 322 million rubles. The monetary reward was granted to the participant who first managed to persuade a celebrity to send a greeting or subscribe and provided proof of their involvement. During the contest, Mellstroy’s Instagram account was followed by YouTuber MrBeast, rappers Drake and Tyga, while football player Kylian Mbappé, Lithuanian president Gitanas Nausėda, blogger Logan Paul, and MMA fighter Conor McGregor sent video greetings to Mellstroy. Later it was discovered that a child asked Mr. Nausėda to record a greeting to Burim during an informal meeting, and the president was not aware of the true nature of the request.

In March 2024, Mellstroy visited Russia, despite previously being wanted in both Russia and Belarus in connection with case of evading military service in the Belarusian army. Later, he purchased sports equipment and clothing for 500 orphanages in Belarus, and his name was removed from the wanted lists.

On March 20, 2024, Mellstroy hosted a joint stream with rapper Morgenshtern on the Kick platform. The stream was watched by 720,000 concurrent viewers, breaking the previous record held by streamer Nekoglai and becoming the most-viewed live broadcast in Russia web segment to date. The owners of various online casinos paid Mellstroy 300 million for this stream. Morgenshtern received US$150,000 from Mellstroy for attracting a large audience. Later in an interview for the Vpiska, Mellstroy stated that after the Morgenshtern stream, he has lost the purpose of life because he had already achieved the viewership record – and since then he “stopped enjoying any numbers”. The interview gained 14 million views within five days.

As of 2026, Mellstroy holds some of the highest live viewership figures among the gambling-themed streamers.

== Personal life ==
=== Financial situation ===
In July 2020, Mellstroy stated that he was earning between 20 and 80 thousand Russian rubles per month. His net worth is estimated between US$7.2 million—US$20 million from all cumulative projects, activities, and advertising. According to some journalistic estimates, Mellstroy could be earning around 80 million in two weeks across all sources of income.

=== Family ===
After becoming wealthy, Mellstroy bought his mother an SUV and a luxury apartment in Gomel worth about 10 million. According to Burim, he previously had disagreements with his older brother over money, as the latter taught him to share with the family. Andrey once gifted his brother US$100,000 for the New Year, as well as an affiliate program from an online casino, which was later returned for an apartment in Moscow and a BMW M5 car.

Mellstroy’s father died in November 2022. In 2023, Burim gave his uncle US$30,000 as a birthday gift and drove him around the island of Mauritius “surrounded by girls” to "taste life".

In March 2025, Mellstroy’s mother and brother were accused of money laundering in the amount of 500,000,000 through purchasing cars and real estate with cryptocurrency. The Mellstroy family owns a number of luxury vehicles, including a Lamborghini STO (2024), Bentley Mulsanne (2017), Rolls-Royce Spectre, Rolls-Royce Phantom Long, and Ferrari.

== Business ventures ==
=== Mellstroy.game ===
In May 2025, Mellstroy announced the launch of an online casino under his name with promises of flexible player policy and charitable activities. However, later that year Burim stated that he was only a brand ambassador promoting the casino and had no connection to project owners, and in 2026, he denied his involvement in the project altogether.

== Philanthropy ==
In March 2024, the streamer purchased sports equipment and clothing for 500 orphanages in Belarus. In March 2025, he donated 5 million for the medical treatment of Pasha Technique, who had fallen into a coma after a drug overdose in Thailand. In May 2025, Mellstroy gifted US$50,000 to MMA fighter Goga Shamatava to purchase an apartment after the athlete became a fraud victim.

In September 2025, Burim awarded 6 million to a schoolgirl from Krasnoyarsk as a gift for a viral TikTok video with over 36 million views, where the girl was filmed every year on the first day of school for eleven years. The money went to the family to purchase housing.

On October 17, 2025, the blogger launched a large-scale challenge featuring a giveaway of 30 apartments and a prize pool of US$1.5 million, with one winner being selected every day for a month. Mellstroy described the project as the most expensive and risky in his career, relying entirely on TikTok promotion without any advertising.

== Legal issues ==
During one of his Moscow streams in October 2020, Mellstroy grabbed a girl named Alyona Yefremova by the head and struck her face down twice against the table, resulting in a criminal case being opened against him for “battery”. In July 2021, the Moscow court sentenced Mellstroy to six months of corrective labor and imposed a fine of 72,000. Later, Mellstroy expressed remorse for his actions. In an interview with the YouTube project Vpiska, Andrey admitted the wrongdoing, stating that some time later he reconciled with the victim. Yefremova later appeared on one of his streams, where Mellstroy gave her 80,000 (around €800).

In October 2026, Mellstroy posted and later deleted a message on his Telegram channel stating that he was located by the police in Cyprus at the request of the Republic of Kazakhstan. His arrest status was not independently confirmed, however, as of 2025, the streamer claimed he was wanted by Interpol for organization of illegal gambling activities. Around the same timeframe, all his videos and visual materials were designated as extremist materials by the Belarusian government.
