= Lower Internet =

Russian-language Internet community

Lower Internet (Russian: Нижний Интернет, romanized: Nizhny Internet) is an informal term for the Runet, the Russian-language segment of the Internet. Its content differs significantly from standard online content and often contradicts generally accepted norms of behavior. Representatives of the lower Internet are usually immoral individuals, mentally ill people, former prisoners, and people with alcohol or drug addictions.

== History ==
In the Russian-speaking world, no one has yet analyzed and systematized the division of the Internet among young people into "upper" and "lower" classification. At the same time, the concept of carnivalesque culture as imagined by Mikhail Bakhtin exists.

== Common features ==
The lower Internet consists of media resources that attract smaller numbers of contributors and audiences than the mainstream Internet. Its authors are primarily focused on creating products that interest them, without paying attention to audience size, number of views, or potential monetization. It includes the demonstration of actions that are unacceptable to a wide audience.

Audiences include people who do not share the values of the "upper" internet. They may be united by their dislike of the mainstream, their search for alternative views, a desire to shock others, or simply a desire to find "their own kind."

Content is provocative, including black humor, profanity, and conspiracy theories. The author of the content makes caustic statements and other things that are not typical of the mainstream internet.

Lower internet platforms can include forums, anonymous imageboards, YouTube channels, and Telegram channels.

== See also ==
- Trash stream
- Dark Web
