= Sasha Skool =

Alexander Andreevich Tkach
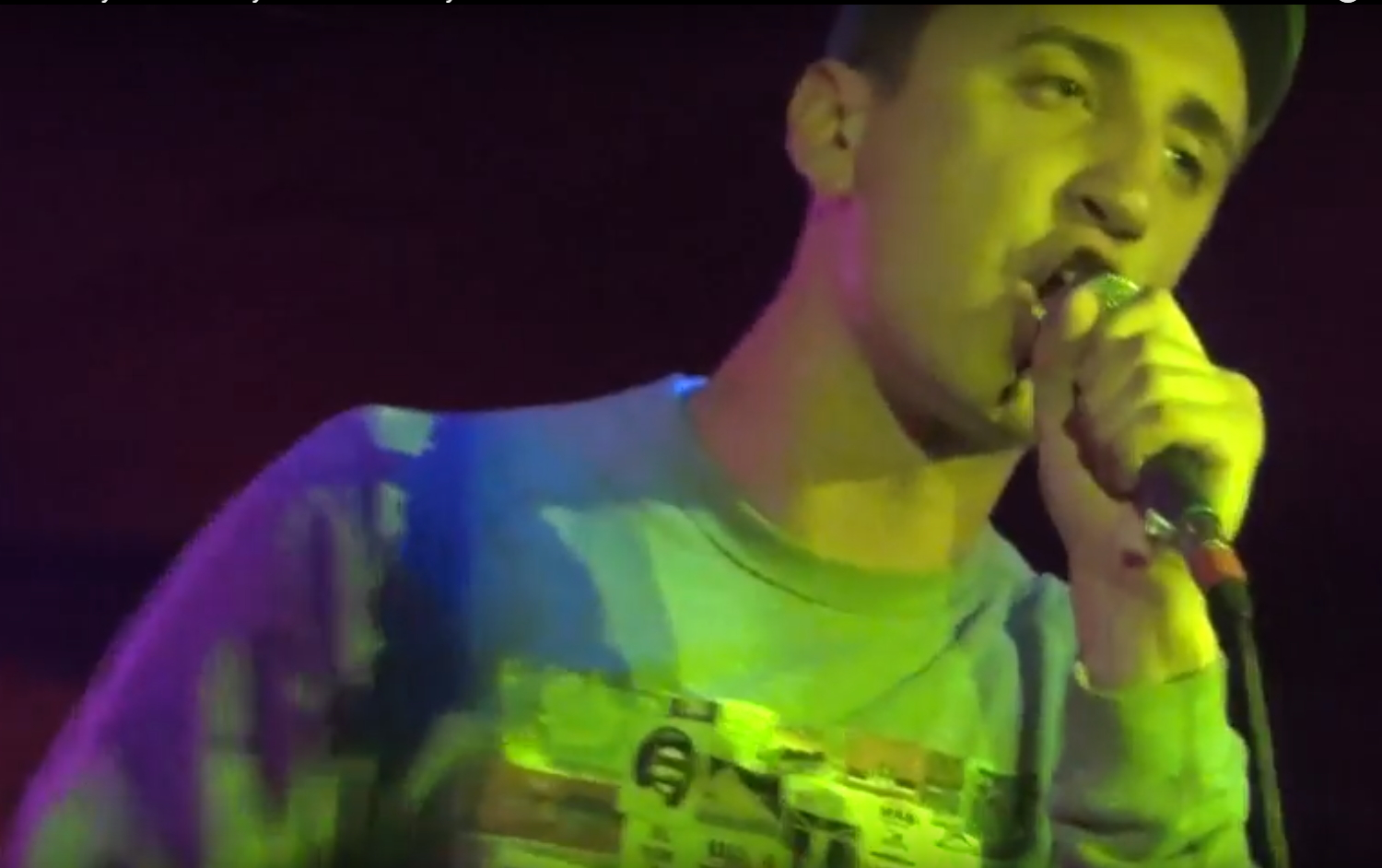

Background information
- Born: 2 June 1989; Bratsk, USSR
- Died: 17 June 2022 (aged 33) Moscow, Russia
- Genres: hip-hop, alternative hip-hop
- Years active: 2004—2022

Alexander Andreevich Tkach (2 June 1989, Bratsk – June 17 2022, Moscow) also known as Sasha Skool, was a Russian rapper and one of the founders of the group Buchenwald Flava. During his musical career, he released five albums as a member of Buchenwald Flava and eleven solo albums.

== Biography ==
=== Early years and early career ===
Tkach was born in Bratsk on 2 June 1989. During his school years, he became interested in Russian hip-hop and rock, listening to bands such as Ellipsis, Lamp Slaves and Red Mold. In 2004, under the pseudonym Sasha Skul, he became a member of the Koba Chok group. Later, in 2009, together with Dmitry Gusev, he created a new collective — Buchenwald Flava, which included the albums My Friend Hitler (2009) and Clockwork Tomato (2011). The band's creative work was characterized by deliberate provocativeness of the content: musicians satirically they turned in their songs to Nazism, xenophobia, to patriotism and banditry.

Since 2011, he began to engage in solo work, releasing his debut album Useless Fossil. In 2013, a new album For Whom the Bell Tolls was released. In 2014, after the release of the album Delirium Tremens, Buchenwald Flava disbanded due to disagreements between the members. In April, he took part in the second season of the show Versus Battle against John Rai. In the same year, a new album was released, Wine from Hemlock. In 2015, he recorded another CD, Kamo pryadeshi.

In 2016, the album Flame was released, produced by RipBeat and Dark Faders; the presentation took place on November 12 in St. Petersburg. The following year, also together with RipBeat and Dark Faders, three albums were recorded: Solntsegrad, Bogachka and 1989, which became the ideological continuation of the 2016 release.

=== Staged death and illness ===
In 2018, the album Songs about You was released, produced by the beatmaker duo Dark Fader., The release track list also includes a humorous cover version of Maxim's song.

In February, reports of the musician's death appeared on the social network VKontakte; a refutation from Skul himself was later published. In May 2019, Sasha Skul reported that he was hospitalized with suspected cancer. In support of Skool, his friends organized a five-hour charity concert, which took place on June 30. Initially, information was also spread that Skul was directly assisted by "his close friend Anna Shulgina", however, according to him, "the Chuvash bratva was engaged in the concert, from her information got to Yelka's social networks, and from her-to singer Shena, Valeria's daughter".

During his illness, Sasha Skul wrote daily notes about his condition on the social network VKontakte, and on November 1, 2019, he released his tenth album Nigredo, in which he documented his battle with cancer. On 7 November 2019, Sasha Skul announced the end of treatment on his social network page.

On 21 February 2020, the first release of Sasha Skula after his illness was released-a joint album with Murda Killa, Navi Tropy, inspired by Russian folklore, with guest verses by Horus and Pyrokinesis. On July 13 of the same year, Murda Killa died due to an asthma attack caused by alcohol and antidepressants.

On April 10, the JAM label, which owns the rights to Skul's songs, sued the BOOM streaming service for 575 thousand rubles for copyright infringement of songs by Sasha Skul and composer Leonid Velichkovsky. The label found songs from Skool's Tagir Majulov album in BOOM's media library, but the copyright information was removed, and the artist did not receive any money from listening to the album. The streaming service could not confirm that it owns the rights to the content.

In July, Skool's second release in 2020 premiered. The album Pestilence is a topical rap to dance music, recorded during self-isolation. School himself describes the album as "not a soundtrack to the end of the world, but a call to a new life-a reminder that the world did not perish".

== Death ==
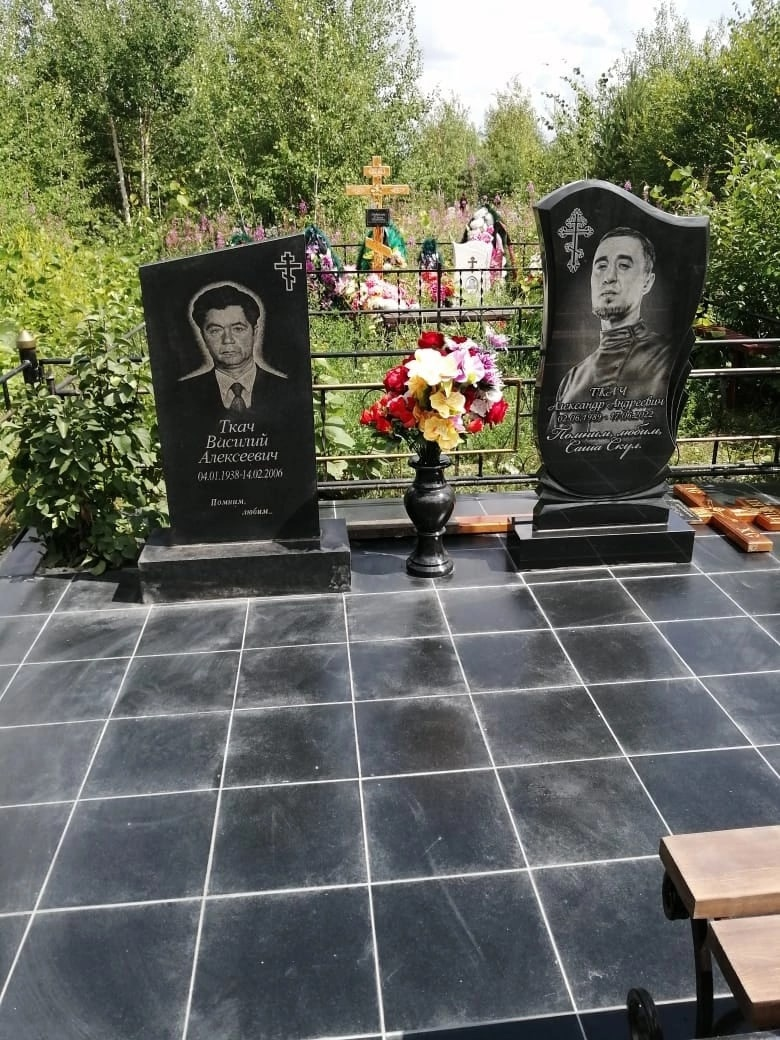
Sasha Skula's grave (right) at the New Cemetery in Bratsk

He died on 17 June 2022 in Moscow; information about the death of Sasha Skul was confirmed to the media by his sister Olga and his friend Nikita Khors.

On June 20, 2022, a funeral farewell was held in Moscow, after which the musician's body was transported to Bratsk, where his funeral was held on June 22, 2022.

On February 16, 2023, the tribute album Death is Inevitable was released in honor of Murda Killa, which was recorded by Sasha.

On February 24, the posthumous album Easter of the Dead was released with the participation of Metox, Pasha Technique and Murda Killa.
