= Jean Pormanove =

French streamer (1979–2025)

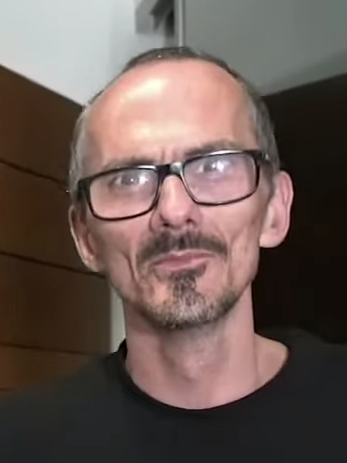
- Pormanove in 2025
- Born: Raphaël Graven; 26 January 1979; Woippy, France
- Died: 18 August 2025 (aged 46); Contes, Alpes-Maritimes, France
- Occupations: YouTuber; streamer; content creator
- Years active: 2020–2025

YouTube information
- Channel: Jean Pormanove
- Subscribers: 202 thousand
- Views: 11.4 million
- Last updated: 23 August 2025

Raphaël Graven (pronunciation; 26 January 1979 – 18 August 2025), known professionally as Jean Pormanove or JP, was a French streamer, videographer, influencer and comedian.

In August 2024, he held the 4th position as the most-watched and most-popular Kick streamer globally. He was also the highest viewed French streamer on the platform.

On 18 August 2025, Pormanove died during a Kick stream that had lasted over 280 hours. The French government announced that it would sue Kick for negligence, alleging that Kick did not stop the broadcast of dangerous material.

== Biography ==
=== Internet career ===
Born in Woippy on 26 January 1979, Pormanove began his career in March 2020 on TikTok, creating humor and gaming videos (including games such as GTA V, FIFA, and Fortnite), and collaborating with influencer TheKairi78. On Twitch, his streams earned him 669,000 followers and totalled more than 35 million views. His content was characterised by an explosive and interactive tone, punctuated by moments of rage, including absurd challenges in his streams, and maintaining close connections to his community. However, his content also attracted criticism through controversial content, such as subject material including provocations, humiliations, and obscenity.

He also participated in events such as the Paris Games Week 2022.

In 2023, Pormanove left Twitch to stream on the platform Kick, and became the highest viewed French streamer on the platform.

=== Controversy before his death ===
In December 2024, a Mediapart investigation denounced an "abuse business" organised around streams, where vulnerable people were exposed to humiliation to generate income and audiences, mentioning Pormanove.

Since January 2025, the Nice Public Prosecutor's Office opened an investigation into several streamers close to Pormanove, Owen "Naruto" Cenazandotti and Safine Hamadi, for suspicion of deliberate violence in assembly with vulnerable persons, endangerment, and the dissemination of violent images.

Shortly before his death, he wrote a message to his mother:

Hi mom, how are you? Stuck for a bit in [Owen Cenazandotti's] death game. It's going too far. I feel like I'm kidnapped with their shitty concept. I'm fed up, I want to get out of here, the other guy won't let me, he's keeping me locked in." (Note: French: Salut maman, comment tu vas ? Coincé pour un moment avec son jeu de mort. Ça va trop loin. J’ai l’impression d’être séquestré avec leur concept de merde. J’en ai marre, je veux me barrer, l’autre il veut pas, il me séquestre.)

A clip from before his death resurfaced after his death. In it, "Naruto" Cenazandotti utters a blunt sentence: "Let him say on camera, right now, that if he dies tomorrow in the middle of a live show, it's due to his shitty state of health and not to us." Pormanove initially refused, but Naruto insisted: "We're in the middle of a live show, you get angry, start screaming and go into cardiac arrest? [...] People are going to take it out on us when it's due to your 46 years of miserable life." (Note: French: Qu'il dise face caméra, maintenant, que si demain il meurt en plein live, c'est dû à son état de santé de merde et pas à nous", "On est en plein live, tu t'énerves, tu te mets à crier et tu fais un arrêt cardiaque ? [...] Les gens vont s'en prendre à nous alors que c'est dû à tes 46 ans de vie minable.)

=== Death ===
Pormanove died on 18 August 2025, at the age of 46, during a live broadcast of more than 280 hours on Kick, which did not censor its content.

Shortly before his death, he reportedly experienced breathing difficulties. One donor alerted one of the participants, "Naruto" Cenazandotti, noting that Pormanove appeared to be in a critical situation and no longer showed any signs of life. Cenazandotti checked Pormanove's condition by throwing a water bottle at him and then slapping him in the face. The live stream was immediately interrupted after the seriousness of the situation was evident.

A few hours later, Naruto publicly confirmed the death of Pormanove on his social networks. He expressed his sadness and paid tribute to the streamer:

Unfortunately, JP (Raphael Graven) has left us ... I love you my brother and we will miss you terribly."

=== Aftermath ===
Following Graven's death, French digital affairs minister Clara Chappaz launched a judicial investigation against Kick. She stated that, prior to his death, Graven had suffered months-long humiliation and mistreatment while streaming for the platform. She referred the case to Arcom and PHAROS.

Youth minister Sarah El Haïry said that Graven's death was "horrifying" and that "platforms have an immense responsibility in regulating online content to ensure our children are not exposed to violent content."

Police interviewed a number of people who were present when he died and seized equipment and videos.

On 19 August 2025, Canadian rapper Drake and American streamer Adin Ross announced their intention to cover the funeral expenses.

On 20 August, Kick announced that it had banned accounts: "All co-streamers who participated in this live broadcast have been banned pending the ongoing legal investigation", and assured that it had "terminated [its] collaboration with the former French social media agency" and undertaken "a complete review of [its] French-language content".

On 22 August, court authorities said his death was not a result of trauma or the intervention of a third party. The prosecutor of Nice said an autopsy showed no trace of traumatic injuries that could explain the death, and that the probable causes of death therefore appear to be medical or toxicological in origin.

On August 26, Chappaz announced that the government would sue Kick for alleged negligence. On the same day, the Paris prosecutor's office announced that an investigation would be opened into whether Kick had violated the EU Digital Services Act and if it had knowingly broadcast "videos of deliberate attacks on personal integrity". Kick criticized these decisions as politicizing the death.

On 27 January 2026, Cenazandotti and Hamadi were taken into custody on charges of assault, incitement to hatred, abuse of a vulnerable person, and recording and broadcasting violent images in connection with Pormanove's death. During the hearings before the Tribunal judiciaire de Nice on 6 and 7 July 2026, the prosecution requested a prison sentence of 30 months for Cenazandotti (consisting of 18 months suspended and one year to be served at home with electronic monitoring) in addition to a fine of €30,000 as well as a suspended prison sentence of 18 months and a fine of €15,000 for Hamadi.

The court rendered its final verdict on 5 August 2026 at 13:30 (CEST). It found both defendants guilty and ordered suspended prison sentences (two years for Cenazandotti, 18 months for Hamadi), fines (€15,000 for Cenazandotti, €5,000 for Hamadi), and prohibited both of them from posting on social media platforms for a period of six months.

== See also ==
- Mate crime – Befriending a vulnerable person with the intent of exploiting them
- Trash stream – Internet broadcast focused on extreme behavior
