= Johnny Somali =

American live streamer (born 2000)

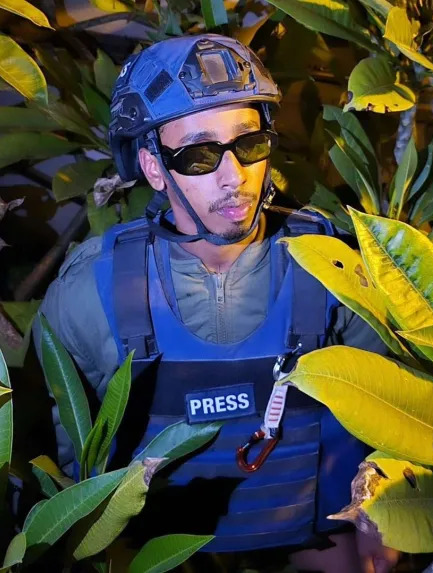
- Ismael c. 2023–2024
- Born: Ramsey Khalid Ismael; September 26, 2000 (age 26); Phoenix, Arizona, U.S.

YouTube information
- Years active: 2023–2024
- Subscribers: 20.7 thousand (old channel)
- Views: 5.4 million (old channel)
- Criminal information
- Status: Incarcerated in South Korea
- Convictions: Obstruction of business (4 counts); Violation of Minor Crimes Act (2 counts); Violation of Special Act of Sexual Violence Crimes (2 counts)
- Penalty: 6 months imprisonment plus 20 days of detention and a five-year employment restriction at institutions related to children, adolescents, and the disabled.

Details
- Date apprehended: April 9, 2025
- Last updated: April 17, 2026

Ramsey Khalid Ismael (born September 26, 2000), better known as Johnny Somali, is an American former live streamer and YouTuber, best known for his provocative and hostile behavior while in other countries. Ismael has been banned from Twitch, Kick, Rumble and Parti.

His behavior has resulted in his arrest, detention and conviction in various countries, including Japan, Israel, and South Korea. Ismael pled guilty to several charges in South Korea, and in 2026 he was sentenced to six months in prison.

== Early life ==
Ramsey Khalid Ismael has reportedly made several conflicting statements about his ethnicity. He reportedly once said that he was born to a Somali father and an Ethiopian mother. Ismael also stated that he was a former child soldier in the Somali Civil War and a former Somali pirate; several sources have expressed doubt about these statements.

Ismael has also stated that he grew up in Scottsdale, Arizona, and graduated from Arizona State University, but he also claims to have been a financial worker and a real estate manager. The Evening Standard cited him as being an Arizona native. He claims to be diagnosed with bipolar disorder.

== Career ==
Ismael garnered notice for documenting his contentious activities in countries such as Japan, and Bali, Indonesia, despite calls requesting him to be barred from entry. After being banned from Twitch, he moved to Kick, before being banned from that platform as well. In 2024, he streamed on Rumble. He also started to stream on Parti, an alternative streaming platform, which eventually suspended him. Somali's YouTube account was terminated in November 2024 after the Statue of Peace incident.

== Incidents, arrests and convictions ==
=== Japan ===
During his travels to Japan, Ismael made anti-Japanese taunts towards locals. This includes comments about the bombings of Hiroshima and Nagasaki, such as him going to people and shouting "Hiroshima, Nagasaki — we'll do it again". Ismael was occasionally assaulted and called racial slurs by locals who recognized him in public. In one incident, he was confronted by an American man for his behavior, leading Ismael to state, "I'm a troll". The American man was praised by many people on the internet for his actions, while Ismael claimed to have been drunk at the time and apologized to the man. Ismael is also accused of having harassed Meowko, a Japanese Twitch streamer, which contributed to Ismael's subsequent 72-hour ban by Kick (instituted after Ismael had already been permanently banned by Twitch). However, she walked away from him after he had bragged that she could be banned if she showed him on her stream, eventually bursting into tears and ending the stream.

In August 2023, Ismael, who was masked, and Jeremiah Dwane Branch, who was recording for him, went into a hotel construction site in Osaka, where he then yelled "Fukushima" at the construction workers. After the construction workers ejected them from the property, Ismael and Branch were both arrested on suspicion of trespassing. In September, they were arrested on the suspicion of conspiracy of obstruction of business when they disrupted a restaurant by playing extremely loud noises and music during business hours. He claimed that the reason the music was playing was because of the phone producer Huawei, who "put a Chinese virus on the phone". This was later brought up in court, where the judge found him guilty and stated, "he could've just turned down the volume on his phone".

On December 19, 2023, Ismael, who had been in custody since his second arrest, appeared at the Osaka District Court on the charge of conspiracy of obstruction of business. The charge of trespassing on a construction site was dropped. Prosecutors requested that he be fined ¥200,000 (equivalent to US$1,400). A verdict of guilty was announced on January 10, 2024.

=== Israel ===
On April 5, 2024, he traveled to the Western Wall in Jerusalem, where he began live-streaming. He filmed himself attaching images of Harvey Weinstein, Adin Ross, and Jeffrey Epstein to the wall.

On April 7, 2024, Ismael was detained at a protest in Tel Aviv for sexual harassment of a female police officer. He was released 16 minutes later, and later that same day, went live again, saying that he had witnessed a mass shooting at a restaurant. Ismael justified these actions by stating that his status as an American citizen made them permissible. One of the men was seen holding an item, possibly a weapon, but Ismael was not assaulted with it.

=== South Korean conviction ===
In August 2025, Ismael faced eight charges in South Korea including "special act of sexual violence" crimes and "obstruction of business" crimes. On April 15, 2026, he was convicted of all of the charges (including the two deepfake charges he pleaded not guilty to) and is currently sentenced to six months in prison.

On September 27, 2024, Ismael went to Seoul, where he played loud, offensive noises on the subway, such as speeches by Kim Jong Un, and was ejected from a bus after playing loud North Korean music.

On October 7, 2024, Ismael kissed and performed lap dances on the Statue of Peace, a memorial that commemorates young comfort women (sex slaves for Japanese soldiers during World War II), though he later apologized for his actions, claiming to be unaware of its significance. On one occasion, Ismael bought ramyeon noodles and purposefully poured them onto a table in the dining area. After being confronted by the store owner and told to leave, Ismael proceeded to throw some of the noodles, making a mess. In addition, after being barred from drinking alcohol, Ismael made sexist comments towards one of the workers. He was reported to the police the same day. Ismael also harassed people on the street with a bag of odorous fish, and he disrupted a bus ride.

On October 26, 2024, there was a confrontation between Ismael and female Kick streamers Moxie and Xena outside of an ABC Pizza in South Korea where he allegedly threatened them.

On October 28, 2024, Ismael's YouTube channel was hacked and later deleted, after it had streamed pornographic content. On multiple occasions, while live-streaming in public, Ismael was assaulted by locals. He was physically assaulted three times by various people, twice in Mapo District, and once by a man who reportedly approached Ismael, asking "Where are you going?" before striking him.

On November 2, 2024, Ismael was barred from leaving the country while under probation for his earlier incidents. On November 6, Ismael uploaded an apology video in which he filmed next to the Statue of Peace and attempted to defend himself by saying, "I didn't understand the significance of the statue", and further elaborating: "I am truly sorry for having been disrespectful." It was reported that bounties had been offered for anyone who would reveal Ismael's location. On April 9, 2025, Ismael was investigated for acts of child sexual harassment in South Korea, as he had, allegedly, used a text-to-speech application to target minors with explicit messages.

In November 2025, Justice Minister Jung Sung-ho said the government was reviewing measures to block foreign nationals from entering Korea if they had previously "expressed hate toward South Korea from overseas."

==== Trial and sentencing ====
On November 11, 2024, Ismael was indicted by the Seoul Southern District Prosecutors' Office on charges of "obstruction of business" over the October 17 incident at the convenience store. A travel ban linked to the case prevents him from leaving South Korea. In December, his trial was postponed until March 7, 2025.

Ismael's trial commenced on March 7, 2025. He arrived an hour late, citing a stomach ache. He attempted to enter the courtroom wearing a MAGA hat, but was prevented from doing so by the courtroom rules. He continued, repeatedly, to put it on despite having been told to remove it. During the trial, Ismael's incident of spilling ramyeon noodles on a table at a convenience store in Mapo-gu was adjudicated an obstruction of business. He was also charged for having caused discomfort to pedestrians in Mapo-gu with a bag of rotten fish, and for having disturbed commuters on a bus and subway by playing loud music and dancing, together constituting two violations of the Minor Crimes Act. He pled guilty to three charges (one charge of obstruction of business and two charges of Minor Crimes Act violations). The next trial date was scheduled to be on April 9, but was later rescheduled to May 16.

Professor Seo Kyoung-Duk of Sungshin Women's University called for a strong sentence to act as deterrent to any other foreign visitors from engaging in similar behavior. Seo further criticized Ismael for calling South Korea a U.S. "vassal state".

In March 2025, Ismael faced two charges of sexual violence and authorities added a sexual charge onto Ismael's case for creating a fabricated pornographic deepfake which depicted a female South Korean streamer and himself without consent. In May 2025, a second sexual charge was added onto Ismael's case for another fabricated pornographic deepfake, depicting another South Korean streamer without consent. Ismael's second hearing was held on May 16, 2025, when prosecutors added one obstruction-of-business charge and two charges under the Special Act on Sexual Violence Crimes. Ismael's lawyers admitted the earlier charges and the bus-obstruction charge, but denied the newly added ones.

Ismael's third trial commenced on August 13, 2025. During the trial, Ismael changed his position on one of the obstruction of business charge to a guilty plea due to a witness from Lotte World showing up to testify against him. Ismael also pled guilty to a fourth charge of obstruction of business. At minimum, Ismael faced a fine, a permanent ban from South Korea, and at most up to seven years in prison. South Korean legal experts said that if sentenced to jail time, Ismael would likely serve a sentence in South Korea, then be deported, followed by an entry ban. The prosecutors for the trial had recommended a sentence of three years in prison.

On April 15, 2026, the Seoul Western District Court found Ismael guilty of all charges and sentenced him to six months in prison. In addition, he was given 20 days of detention and a five-year employment restriction at institutions related to children, adolescents, and the disabled.

==== Post-sentencing ====
Both Ismael and the prosecutors filed appeals, with prosecutors seeking a harsher sentence. In an appeal hearing on June 11, 2026, the prosecution argued for a three-year sentence. Somali requested leniency, testifying that he had been diagnosed with bipolar disorder and had discontinued taking medication to treat it upon entering Korea. A ruling was scheduled for June 25, 2026. The result of the ruling was that the judge upheld his conviction and sentencing, saying his sentence should not be extended or reduced. Though, the court did deem the confiscation of Ismael's phone did not have legal grounds to be upheld. Due to the fact that the charges include sexual violence, it would require that, after Ismael's sentence, he would have to register as a sex offender in his return to the United States.

== See also ==
- IRL streaming
