= Peace Monument of Glendale =

Replica of a memorial dedicated to comfort women

Coordinates: 34°08′36″N 118°15′13″W

The Peace Monument of Glendale is an exact replica of the original memorial dedicated to comfort women, the Statue of Peace. The statue is located in Central Park near the Glendale Public Library in Glendale, California, United States. The Glendale Peace Monument was funded and built in 2013 by the Korean American Forum of California, a non-profit human rights organization. The installation of the memorial happened shortly after Toru Hashimoto, former mayor of Osaka, Japan, expressed that comfort women were necessary to maintain discipline within the Japanese army during World War II. The unveiling of the statue was also considered a celebration due to the passing of a 2007 United States House of Representatives resolution, which urged the Japanese government to accept responsibility for their wartime crimes.

== Appearance ==
The 1,100 pound bronze statue monument is a replica of the original comfort women statue located in Seoul, South Korea. It depicts a girl sitting in a chair, with an empty chair beside her. The chair represents aging survivors who have not yet received justice, as well as space for people to sit and reflect on how women and girls were subjected to become sex slaves during the Japanese wartime. The statue of the girl herself represents many different aspects and effects of the violence and exploitation experienced by comfort women. For example, the statue portrays a girl with unevenly cut hair due to it being torn off. The unevenness and rough appearance of the hair represents the suffering comfort women endured as a result of being taken from their homes and forced into sex slavery. Her clenched fist represent her resolve for justice, as well as her resolve for endurance and defiance against her injustice. Her bare unsettled feet represent being abandoned by the world, along with her inability to ground and settle herself, unable to completely trust her environment. The bronze bird located at the top of her left shoulder symbolizes not only the connection between the living and the deceased, but as a symbol of freedom and peace. The shadow behind the young girl is of an elderly woman, fragmented pieces of painful memories symbolizing the passing of time with her trauma left unspoken. Finally, is the butterfly located at the center of shadow's body, right at her heart. This butterfly depicts the hope to be reincarnated with a new life in a different world, but also that one day, whether in this life or the next, the sexually exploited victims of Japanese colonial rule, comfort women, will receive their apology.

== Controversy ==
After Glendale City Councilman Frank Quintero announced plans for an identical Statue of Peace to be installed the Central Park of Glendale, it was met with particular opposition from Japanese entities. Dozens of Japanese-Americans filled the City Hall chamber in opposition to the installation of the statue, with some claiming the comfort women narrative depicted by Koreans as manufactured or exaggerated. Ultimately, however, the Glendale City Council agreed 4 to 1 to become the first United States city on the west coast to install a memorial to commemorate comfort women. A lawsuit was then filed by two Glendale residents, Michiko Shiota Gingery and Koichi Mera together with the Global Alliances for Historical Truth-US Corp, a non-profit organization dedicated to “defending the honor of Japan”. They claimed the memorial would cause “irreparable injury” and cause discomfort to Japanese-American citizens who would be seen with disapproval and prejudice. The plaintiffs also argued that the installation of the statue exceeds the power of Glendale, and infringes on the U.S. government's ability to handle foreign affairs. Other opponents of the statue expressed the idea that comfort women were being hailed as prostitutes.

Another point brought up by many opponents was the 2015 agreement between the South Korean and Japanese governments. The agreement stated that both governments would refrain from criticizing or accusing the other in the international community over the topic concerning comfort women. Under the agreement, Japan took responsibility for the issue of comfort women, but South Korean activists claimed the apology was vague and did not explicitly state that Japan took "legal" responsibility over the enslavement of comfort women. An additional point raised by activists states that Japan and South Korea made the agreement because of pressure from the U.S. government to form a united front for national security reasons.

Other organizations known as the San Fernando Valley Japanese American Citizens League, Japanese American Bar Association and the Nikkei for Civil Rights and Redress came out in defense of the statue. The coordinator of the Korean American Forum of California, Won Choi expressed the importance of the statue because it reminds people of the rights that were violated, and to warn others about the vulnerability women face in time of war. The U.S. Supreme Court dismissed the case against the statue, validating its right to remain in the park. Julie Tang, chairwoman of the Comfort Women Justice Coalition, views this ruling as a victory for comfort women, as well as giving a green light for future statues to be placed all over the United States.
