= Embassy of Japan, Seoul =

Diplomatic mission in South Korea

Embassy of Japan in Seoul
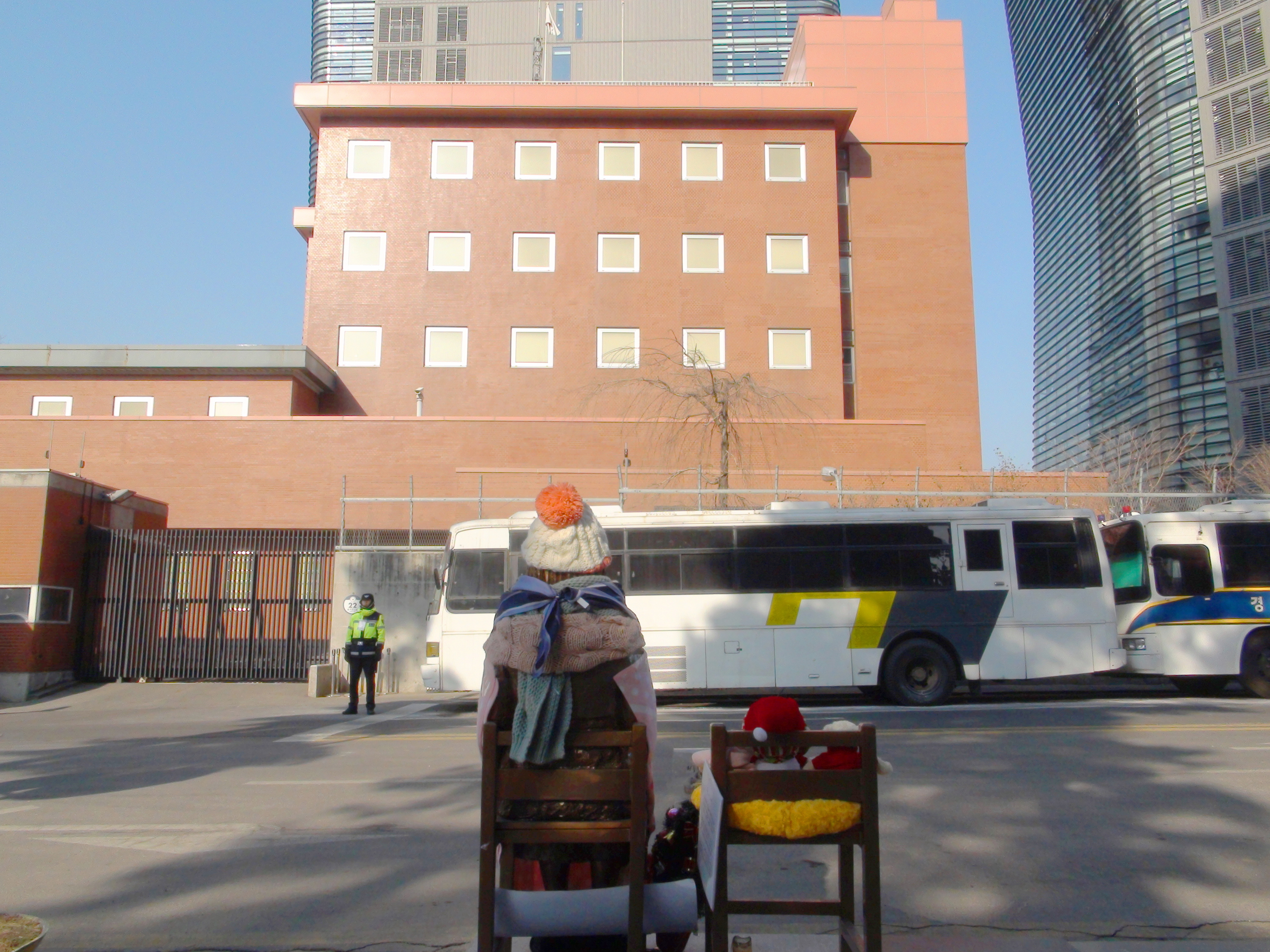
- Location: Seoul
- Address: Twin Tree Tower A, 6, Yulgok-ro, Jongno-gu, Seoul, South Korea
- Coordinates: 37.5754°N 126.9798°E
- Ambassador: Koichi Aiboshi

The Embassy of Japan in Seoul (Korean: 주 대한민국 일본 대사관; Hanja: 駐大韓民國 日本 大使館) is the diplomatic mission of Japan in South Korea. It is located in Seoul, South Korea's capital.

In addition to this embassy, Japan also has two consulates in South Korea: one in Busan and one in Jeju City.

== History ==
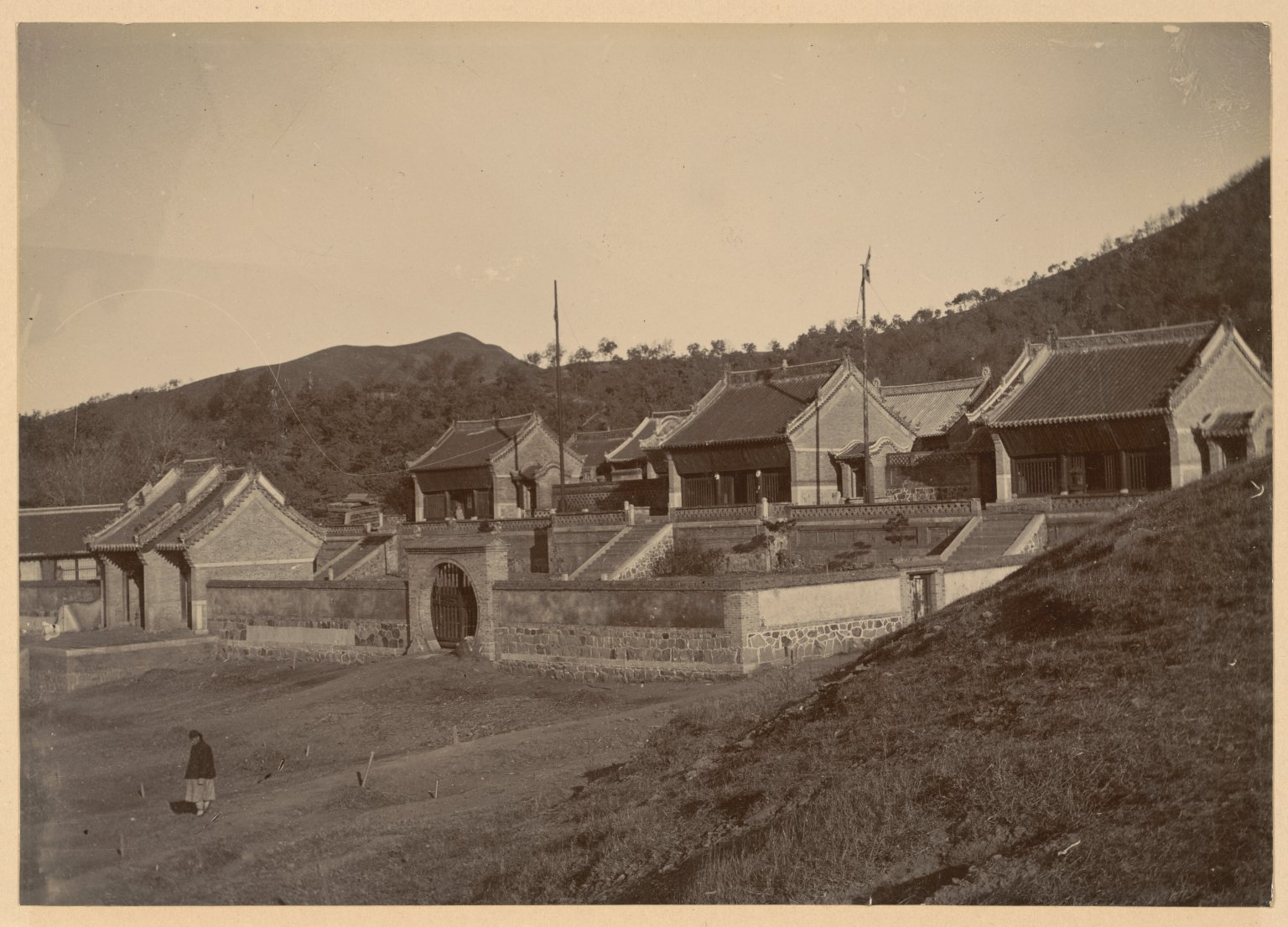
Japanese Consulate (1904)

The very first diplomatic installation was the consulate of Japan that was set up in Seoul in the year of 1879. The current embassy was opened on 18 December 1965, following the re-establishment of relations between the two countries, under its first ambassador, Toshikatsu Maeda. In 2015, the embassy was moved to the Twin Tree Tower as a temporary location while the embassy building is being renovated.

== Design ==
The building has been described as "a large, red brick structure surrounded by high, barbed-wire-topped walls and guarded at all hours by dozens of police officers".

== Demonstrations ==
The embassy is known as the site of numerous South Korean anti-Japanese demonstrations. In 1974, the embassy was ransacked by angry protesters during a time of heightened tensions between Japan and South Korea. In 2005, two South Koreans sliced off their fingers during a protest related to the Liancourt Rocks dispute outside the embassy. In 2012, a South Korean driver rammed his truck against the gate of the embassy, claiming it was done to highlight the Liancourt Rocks dispute.

=== Comfort women protests ===
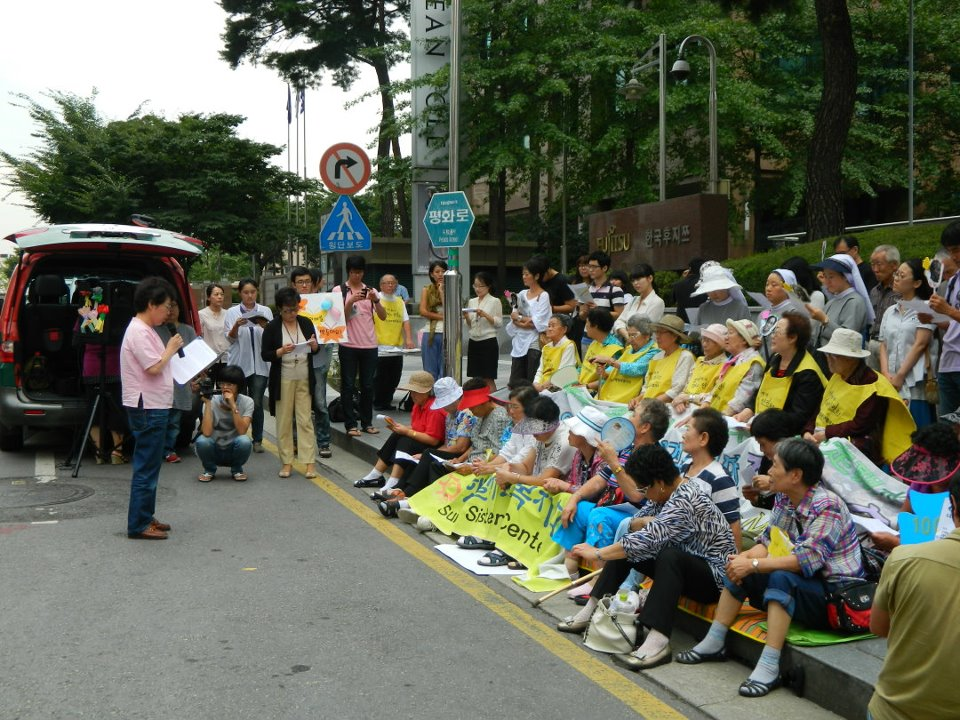
A comfort women rally in front of the embassy, August 2011

Since 1992, the embassy has been a site of weekly Wednesday demonstrations related to the comfort women issue. The controversial Statue of Peace, related to the comfort women issue, was unveiled in front of the embassy in 2011, causing another lengthy diplomatic row between Japan and South Korea. In 2012, a Chinese man threw four Molotov cocktails at the embassy to voice his anger over the comfort women issue. In 2015, an elderly South Korean man set himself on fire during a weekly Wednesday demonstration.

== Gallery ==
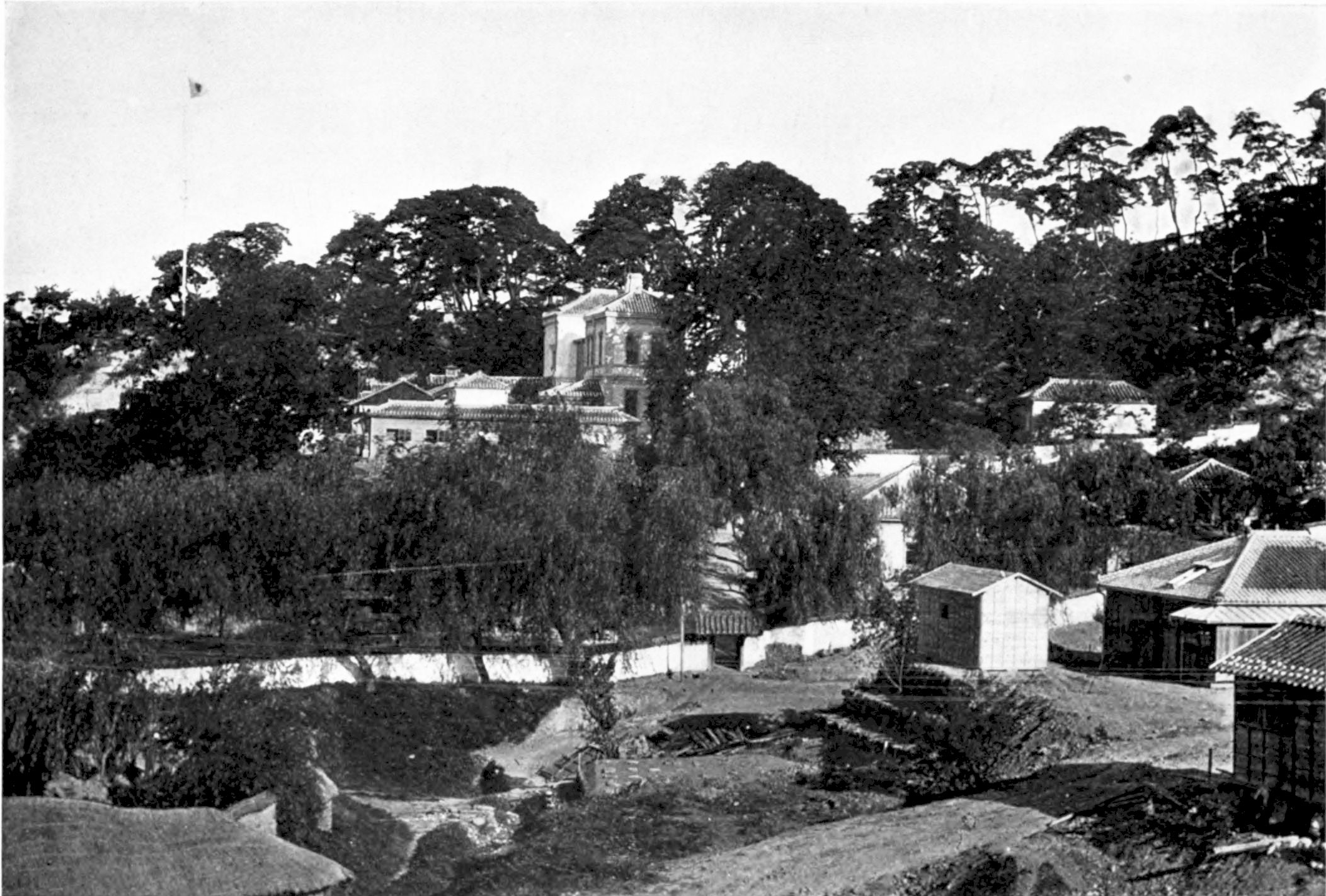
Japanese legation to Korea(1900)

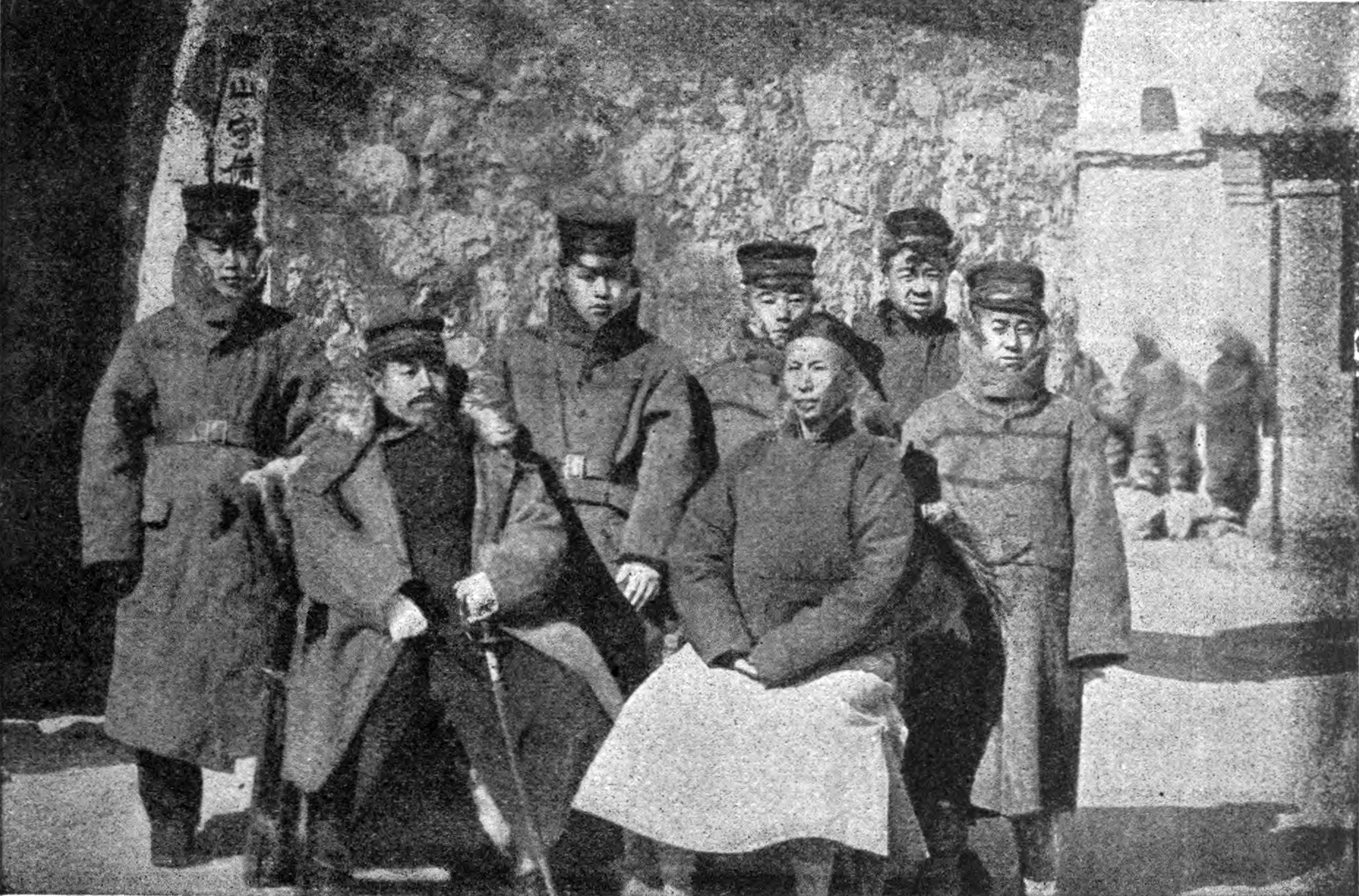
Japanese guards protecting its Legation

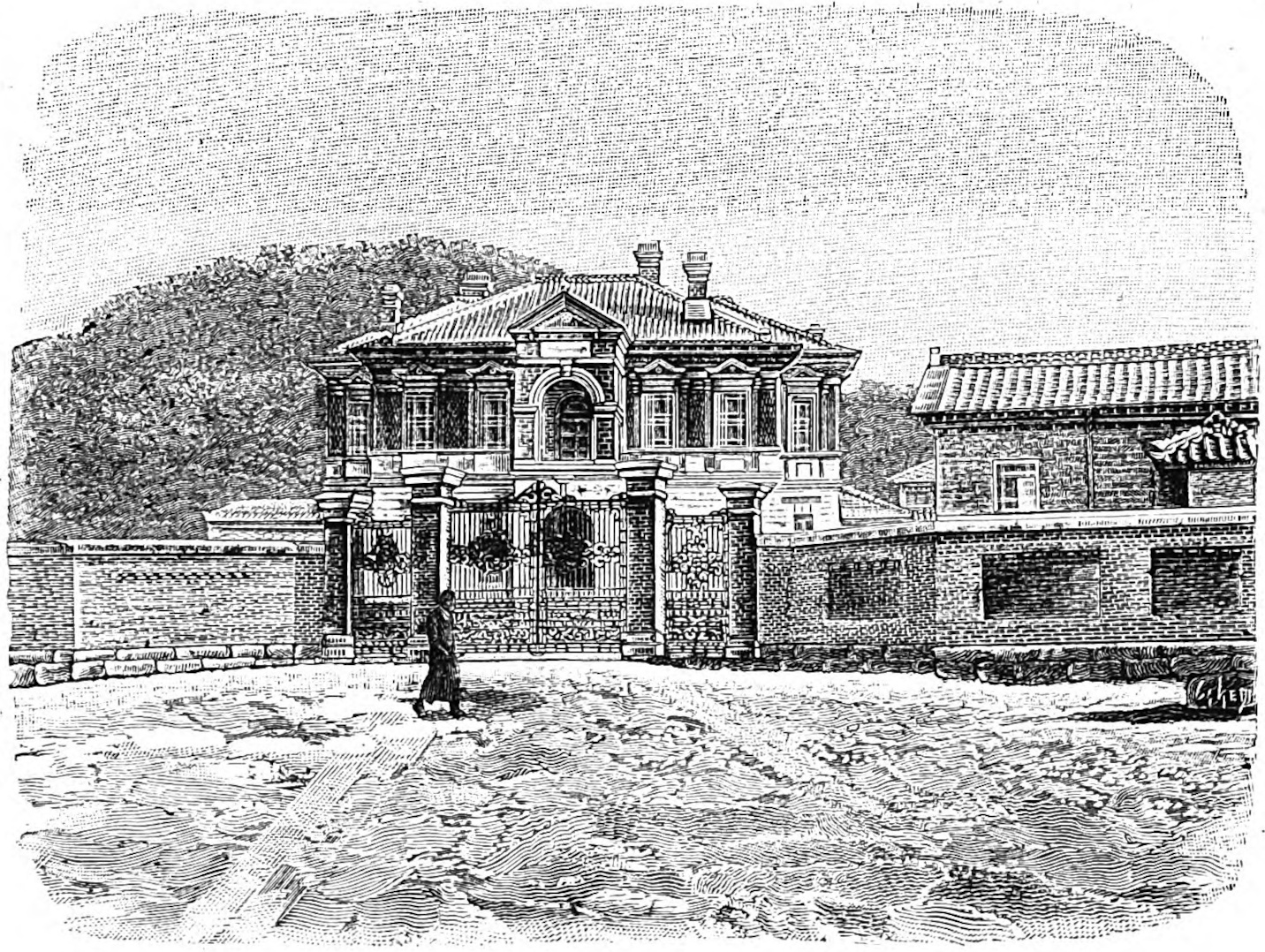
Drawing of Japanese legation(1901)

== See also ==
- Consulate-General of Japan, Busan
- Consulate-General of Japan, Jeju
