= Statue of Peace =

Memorial statue in Seoul, South Korea

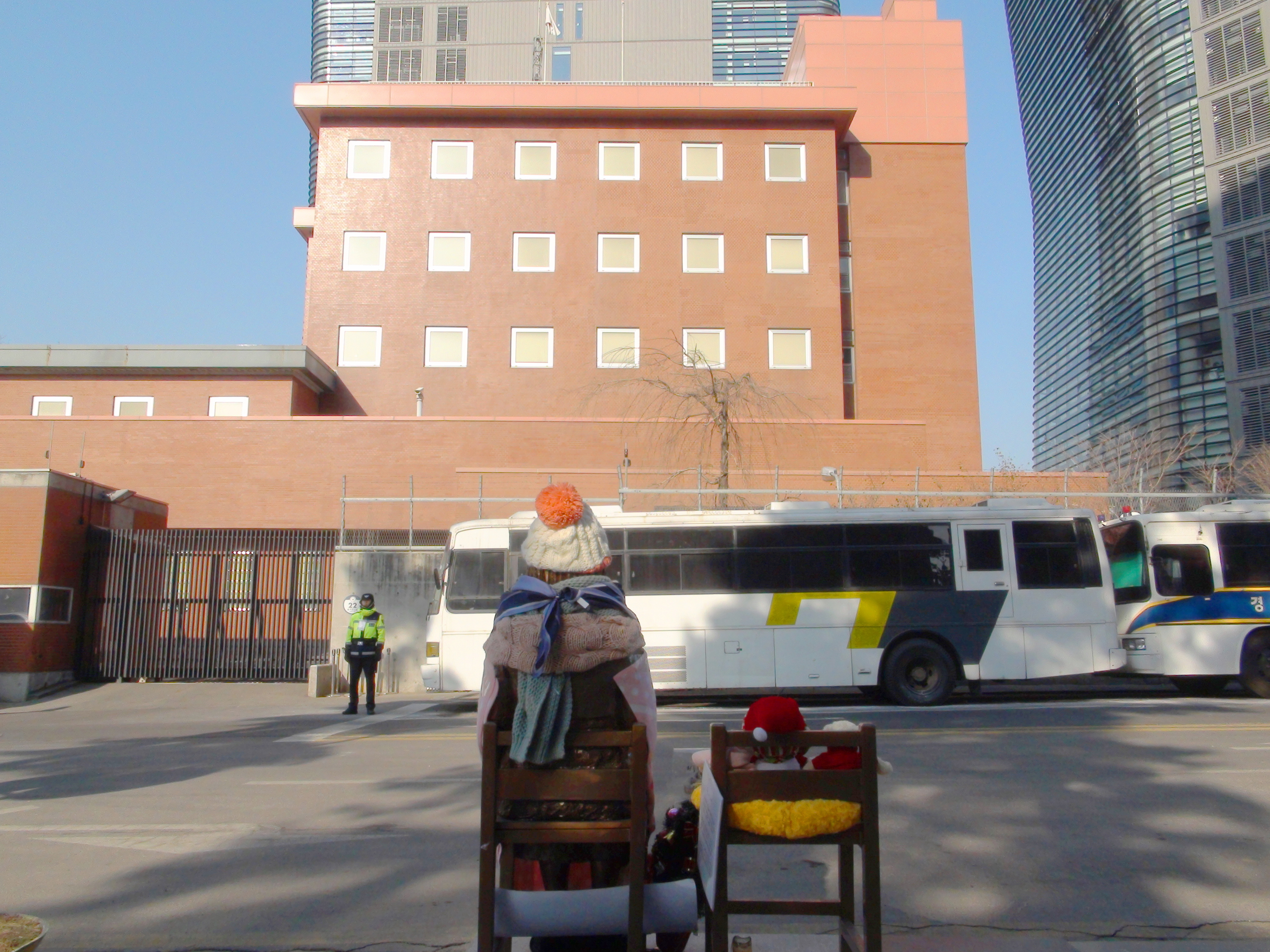
- Statue of Peace from behind, facing the Embassy of Japan
- Artists: Kim Seo-kyung and Kim Eun-sung
- Completion date: 14 December 2011
- Medium: Bronze
- Location: Seoul, South Korea

Korean name
- Hangul: 평화의 소녀상
- Hanja: 平和의 少女像
Transcriptions
- Revised Romanization: Pyeonghwaui sonyeosang
- McCune–Reischauer: P'yŏnghwaŭi sonyŏsang

Japanese name
- Kanji: 平和の少女像
- Hiragana: へいわのしょうじょぞう
Transcriptions
- Revised Hepburn: Heiwa no shōjo-zō
- Kunrei-shiki: Heiwa no syôzyo-zô

The Statue of Peace (Korean: 평화의 소녀상; Japanese: 平和の少女像), often shortened to Sonyeosang in Korean or Shōjo-zō in Japanese (literally "statue of girl") and sometimes called the Comfort Woman Statue (慰安婦像, Ianfu-zō), is a symbol of the women forced into sexual slavery—known euphemistically as comfort women—by the Imperial Japanese Armed Forces before and during World War II—specifically, the period from the beginning of the Second Sino-Japanese War until the end of the Pacific War. The Statue of Peace was first erected in Seoul to urge the Japanese government to apologize to and honour the victims. It has since become a site of representational battles among different parties.

== History ==
The Wednesday demonstration started in 1992 and, nearly 20 years later, the idea for the Statue of Peace was proposed by the Korean Council for Women Drafted for Military Sexual Slavery by Japan. More specifically, the council proposed that a memorial stone be erected in front of the embassy of Japan in Seoul to commemorate the women forced into sexual slavery by the Imperial Japanese Armed Forces during the Second Sino-Japanese War and the Pacific War—euphemistically referred to as "comfort women". This proposal was realized on 14 December 2011, when the bronze statue was installed in front of the embassy.

The Statue of Peace was designed by the couple Kim Seo-kyung and Kim Eun-sung. It depicts a girl dressed in a chima jeogori, a modified form of hanbok in the late-19th to early-20th century, with small hands and short hair, sitting and staring at the embassy of Japan in central Seoul.

Japan has repeatedly demanded that the statue be removed. Seoul, and especially the victims, have rejected such demands, consistently arguing that the Japanese government has never officially admitted the direct involvement of its military in the comfort women issue.

Until now in South Korea, since the Statue of Peace has not been designated as a public sculpture, it has been difficult to prevent it from being damaged. In June 2017, the civil congress of the city of Busan created a legal foundation to protect the statue by passing the relevant ordinance.

== Diplomatic incident with Japan ==
According to the Japanese Ministry of Foreign Affairs, in 2015, South Korea and Japan reached an agreement to settle the comfort women issue. As a part of this agreement, South Korea acknowledged the fact that Japan was concerned about the statue in front of the embassy of Japan in Seoul and committed to solve the issue in an appropriate manner. However, the South Korean government has never explicitly promised to remove the statue.

In December 2015, Japan stated that it would not pay ¥1 billion as compensation unless the Statue of Peace was removed from its location in Seoul, since South Korea agreed to address the statue issue, yet failed to do so. Afterward, a second statue was erected in Busan. Japan then recalled two diplomats from South Korea and halted high-level talks.

South Korea terminated the 2015 agreement in November 2018 and effectively shut down the Japanese-funded comfort women foundation that was set up to pay the agreed settlement. Japan maintains that the agreement is still legally binding and therefore, the placement of the statue is illegal.

== Local opposition to the Statue of Peace in the United States ==
In July 2021, the city council in Aurora, Colorado voted against a proposal for a Statue of Peace to be installed on public property. After the vote, city staff wrote "The memorials have attracted a wide range of community response including peaceful and antagonistic free speech events, vandalism, Asian hate, and legal action requesting removal". The letter also states, "The City of Aurora is the most culturally diverse community in Colorado with many Asian citizens. The memorial represents an unresolved dispute between South Korea and Japan. Based on this information, the Parks, Recreation, and Open Space Department believes the memorial placement on city-owned property is not a compatible use".

== Other statues inspired by the Statue of Peace ==
The issue of comfort women and the Statue of Peace has inspired other such monuments to be built in Seoul and in cities around the world with sizeable Korean populations. The San Francisco Comfort Women Memorial is the first in a major U.S. city; it was unveiled in September 2017. After the statue was revealed, Osaka, Japan ended its decades-long sister-city relationship.

In May 2012, officials in Koreatown, Palisades Park, New Jersey, rejected requests by two diplomatic delegations from Japan to remove a small monument from a public park, a brass plaque on a block of stone, dedicated in 2010 to the memory of the comfort women. Days later, a South Korean delegation endorsed the borough's decision. However, in neighboring Koreatown, Fort Lee, various Korean American groups could not reach a consensus on the design and wording for such a monument as of early April 2013.

In October 2012, a similar memorial was announced in nearby Hackensack, New Jersey, to be raised behind the Bergen County Courthouse, alongside memorials to the Holocaust, the Great Irish Famine, slavery in the United States, and the Armenian genocide, and it was unveiled in March 2013.

The Peace Monument of Glendale is an exact replica of the Statue of Peace. The Glendale statue was funded and built in 2013 by the Korean American Forum of California, a nonprofit human rights organization.

A replica of the statue, located in Stintino, Italy, has reportedly caused Japanese far-right figures to send threatening emails, letters, and packages to the government of the comune.

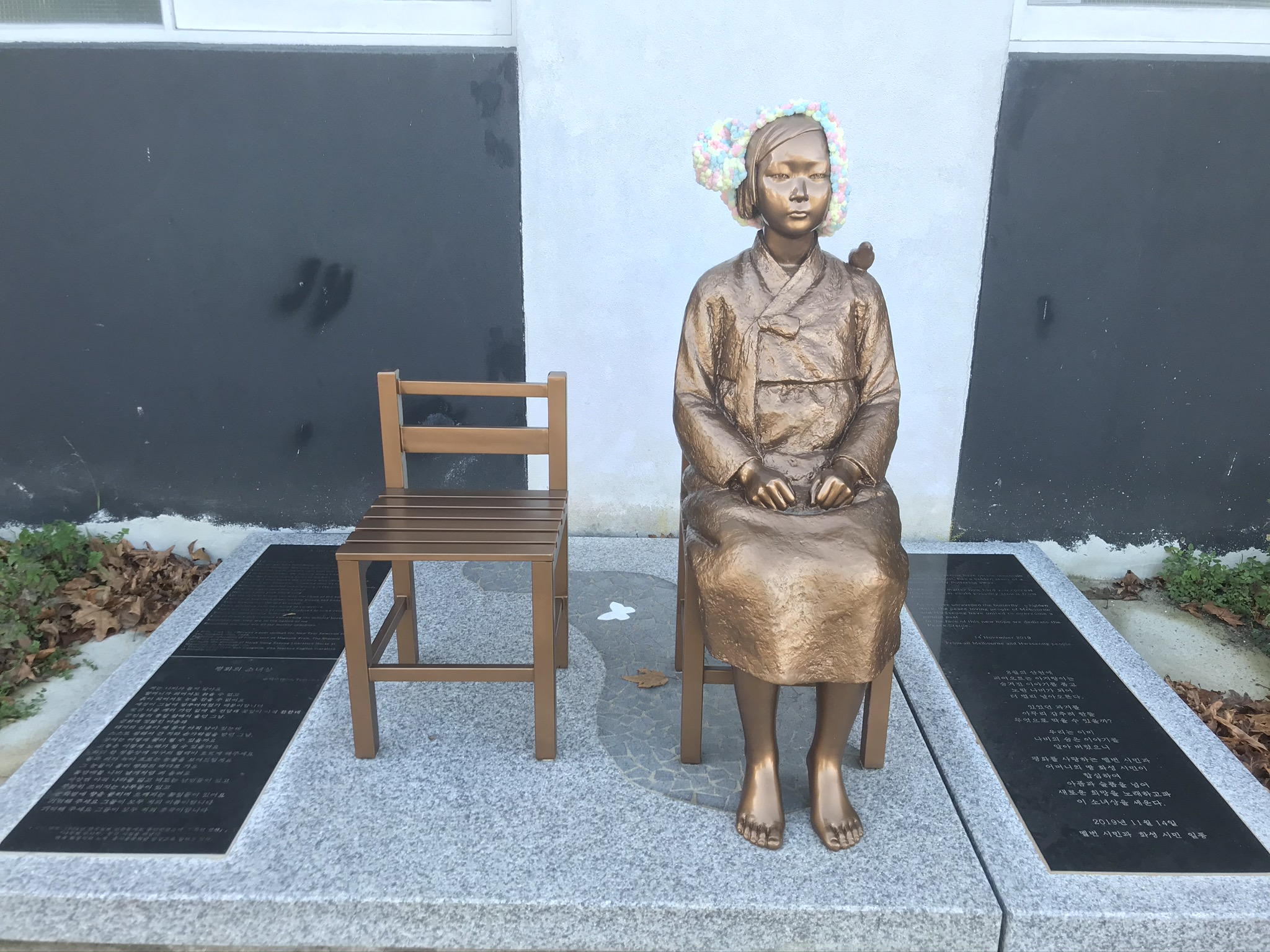
Statue of Peace in Melbourne, Australia

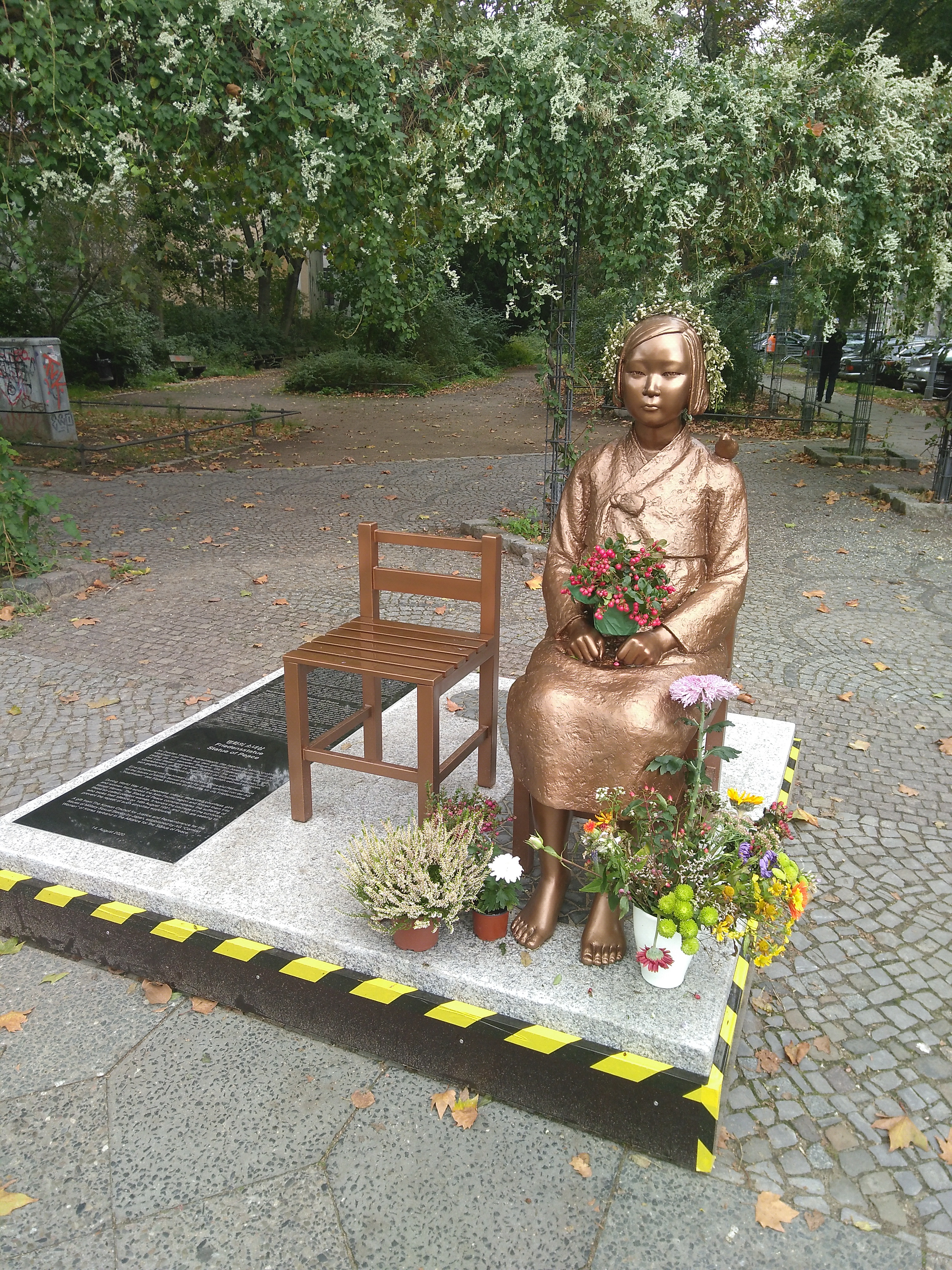
Statue of Peace in Berlin, Germany

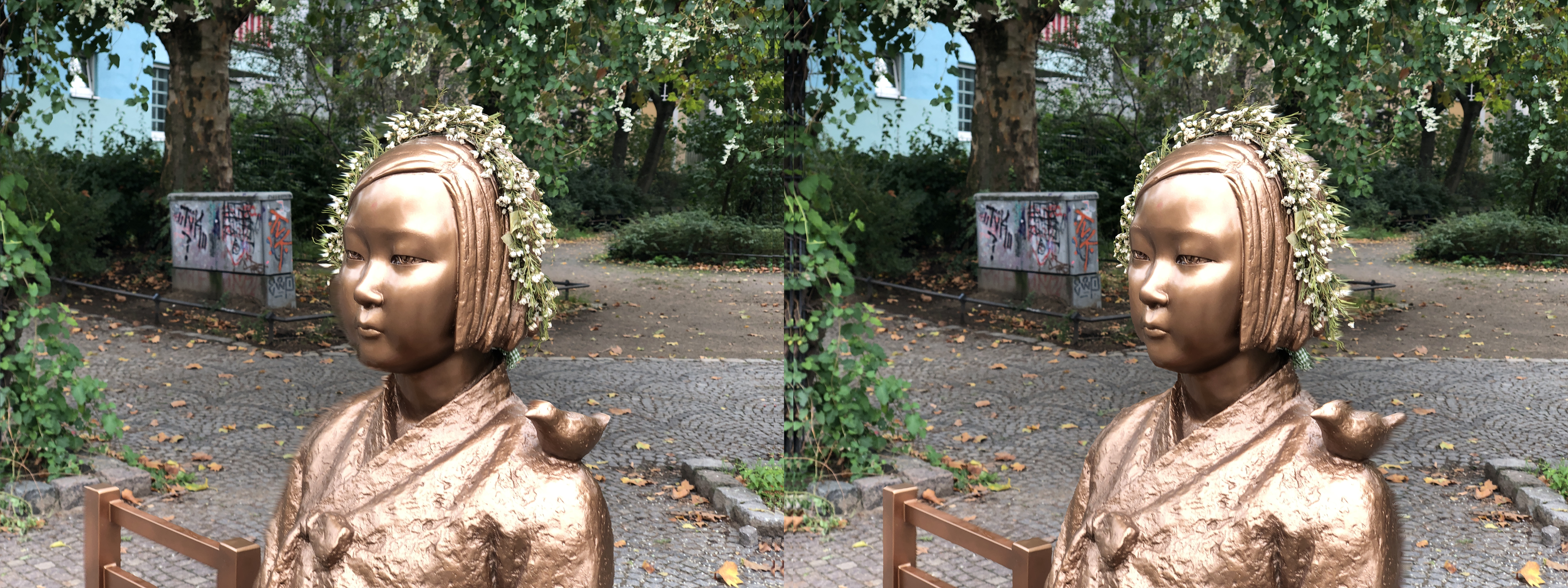
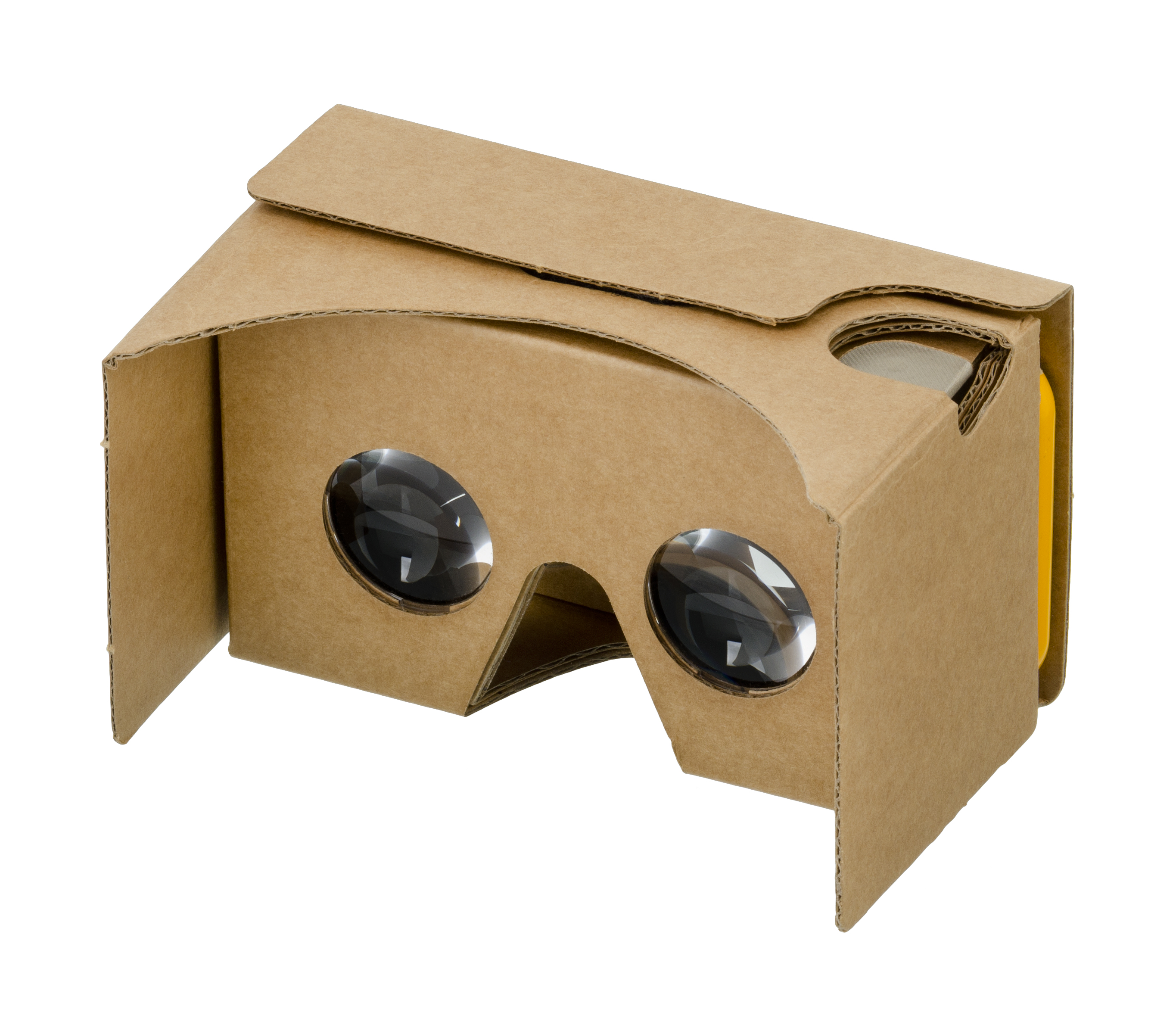
Friedensstatue (3D view)

== See also ==
- Peace Monument of Glendale
- Japan–Korea disputes
- Japanese war crimes
