= List of public art in San Francisco =

This is a list of public art in San Francisco. This list applies only to works of public art accessible in a public space. For example, this does not include artwork visible inside a museum.

== Balboa Park ==
Title	Image	Artist	Year	Location	Coordinates	Material	Dimensions	Owner
Transverse and Column		Carroll Barnes	1977	Muni Barn, Corner of Ocean & San Jose Ave, Curtis E. Green Metro Center		Cor-ten steel	8 x 9 x 19 ft.	San Francisco Museum of Modern Art

== Civic Center ==
Title	Image	Artist	Year	Location	Coordinates	Material	Dimensions	Owner
Abraham Lincoln		Haig Patigian	1926	San Francisco City Hall		Bronze	H. 5 ft.	San Francisco Arts Commission
Hiro II		Peter Voulkos	1971	San Francisco City Hall		Bronze		
Hall McAllister	Hall McAllister by Robert Ingersoll Aitken - San Francisco, CA - DSC02820	Robert Ingersoll Aitken	1904	San Francisco City Hall		Bronze		

== Chinatown ==
Title	Image	Artist	Year	Location	Coordinates	Material	Dimensions	Owner
Chinese Foo Dogs		Mary Erckenbrack	1952	711 Pacific Ave., at the Ping Yuen Housing Project	37°47′48.37″N 122°24′27.49″W	Terra cotta	8 dogs; each 18 x 12 x 15 in.	San Francisco Arts Commission
Dr. Sun Yat-sen		Benny Bufano	1937	Saint Mary's Square	37°47′31.45″N 122°24′19.63″W	Stainless steel & rose granite	H. 12 ft.	San Francisco Arts Commission
Dragon Relief		Patti Bowler	1969	Broadway Tunnel	37°47′50.03″N 122°24′40.71″W	Bronze	9 x 56 x 2 1/2 ft.	San Francisco Arts Commission
Goddess of Democracy		Thomas Marsh	1989	Portsmouth Square	37°47′41.66″N 122°24′19.31″W	Bronze & patina	114 x 33 x 33 in.	
Guardian		Bruce Beasley	1992	600 California Street	37°47′34.06″N 122°24′17.79″W	Bronze & patina	Two pieces. Part 1: approx. 13 ft. x 70 in. x 71 in.; Part 2: approx. 25 x 42 x 46 in.	
Tot Lot		Mary Fuller and Robert P. McChesney	1983	Portsmouth Square		Concrete & glass	86 in. x 30 ft. 7 in. x 25 ft. 9 in.	
San Francisco Comfort Women Memorial		Steven Whyte	2017	Saint Mary's Square	37°47′30.51″N 122°24′16.15″W	Bronze		
Auspicious Clouds		Michael Arcega	2018	Chinatown–North Beach corridor		Stainless steel		San Francisco Arts Commission

== Embarcadero ==
Title	Image	Artist	Year	Location	Coordinates	Material	Dimensions	Owner
Aurora		Ruth Asawa	1986	188 The Embarcadero		Stainless steel		
Bay Bench		Steve Gillman	1990	Pier 7, bay side		Sunset red granite and bronze	2 pieces. Approx. 1 ft. 5 in. x 8 ft. 4 in.; Bronze insert is approx. 6 ft. 6 in. square.	Port of San Francisco
Cupid's Span		van Bruggen and Oldenburg	2002	Rincon Park		Fiberglass and steel	64 ft. x 143 ft. 9 in. x 17 ft. 3/8 in.	
Guardians of the Gate		Miles Metzger	1991	Pier 39	37°48′31.44″N 122°24′38.9″W	Everdur bronze	4 ft. 6 in. x 8 ft. x 5 ft.	Pier 39 Limited Partnership
History of San Francisco		Anton Refregier	1948	Rincon Center lobby	37°47′33″N 122°23′31″W	Mural, tempera on gesso	27 panels, collectively 400 ft. × 6 ft. 9 in.	Hudson Pacific Properties
International Longshoreman's and Warehousemen's Union Memorial		Various artists	1986	Intersection of Mission Street & Steuart Street	37°47′36.30″N 122°23′36.30″W	Welded steel, paint, concrete	3 units. Sculpture: overall approx. 15 x 20 x 9 ft.	San Francisco Arts Commission
Mahatma Gandhi Statue		Zlatko Pounov and Steven Lowe	1988	In the plaza to the northeast of the San Francisco Ferry Building	37.795°N 122.392°W	Bronze	8 Ft	
Skygate		Roger Barr	1985	On the Embarcadero, between Pier 35 and Pier 39	37°48′29.07″N 122°24′29.15″W	Stainless steel, concrete footings	27 ft. x 17 ft. 6 in. x 3 ft. 6 in.	San Francisco Arts Commission

== Financial District ==
Title	Image	Artist	Year	Location	Coordinates	Material	Dimensions	Owner
Bronze Sculpture		Gwynn Merril		200 California St.	37°47′36.74″N 122°23′55.82″W	Bronze	92 x 29 x 22 in.	
Dyonisos		Arman	1988	Federal Reserve Bank Building	37°47′40″N 122°23′58″W	Bronze	89 x 39 3/8 x 22 3/4 in.	Pacific Property Services
Hermes		Arman	1988	Federal Reserve Bank Building	37°47′40″N 122°23′58″W	Bronze	87 1/2 x 39 1/2 x 22 1/2 in.	Pacific Property Services
Horse		Marino Marini	1967	One Maritime Plaza	37°47′45.69″N 122°23′55.7″W	Bronze	43 1/2 x 64 x 17 in.	San Francisco Arts Commission
Monadnock Lion Heads		Charlie Brown	1986	Monadnock Building		Bronze		
Pacific Bird		Seymour Lipton	1964	Golden Gateway Center		Nickel silver & Monel metal	H. 84 in.	Golden Gateway Center
The Penguins		Beniamino Bufano	1967	Golden Gateway Center		Porphyry granite and stainless steel	103 x 37 x 32 in.	Golden Gateway Center
Puddle Jumpers		Glenna Goodacre	1989	Transamerica Redwood Park	37°47′41.88″N 122°24′6.84″W	Bronze	78 x 152 x 48 in.	
Standing Figure, Knife-Edge		Henry Moore	1962	One Maritime Plaza		Bronze	15 ft. x 3 1/2 ft. x 1 ft. 4 in.	San Francisco Arts Commission
Transcendence		Masayuki Nagare	1968-1969	555 California Street	37°47′32.86″N 122°24′14.51″W	Polished Swedish black granite	13 ft. x 19 ft. 6 in. x 25 ft. 3 in.	Shorenstein Properties and Bank of America
Two Open Rectangles Eccentric Variation VII Triangle Section		George Ricket	1977	Sydney Walton Square	37°47′51.6″N 122°23′57.27″W	Brushed stainless steel, tin base	H. 20 ft. x W. 10 ft.	Garden Gateway Center
Untitled		Marie-Rose Henri	1979	Engine House 13	37°47′44.64″N 122°24′5.31″W	Braised-pounded copper	5 ft. x 7 ft.	San Francisco Arts Commission

== Fisherman's Wharf ==
Title	Image	Artist	Year	Location	Coordinates	Material	Dimensions	Owner
Andrea		Ruth Asawa	1968	Ghirardelli Square	37°48′21.61″N 122°25′21.01″W	Bronze, concrete, cobblestones	Sculpture: approx. H. 4 ft. 6 in., Diam. 10 ft. 6 in.; Base (three steps:) approx. H. 2 ft. 2 in., Diam. 28 ft.	Ghirardelli Square Associates
Saint Francis de la Varenne		Benny Bufano	1928	Corner of Taylor & Beach St.	37°48′26.78″N 122°24′50.52″W	Carved granite	15 x 10 x 2 1/2 ft.	San Francisco Bay Area Longshoreman's Memorial Association & Warehouseman's Union

== Forest Hill, San Francisco ==
Title	Image	Artist	Year	Location	Coordinates	Material	Dimensions	Owner
Florence Nightingale		David Edstrom	1936-1937	Laguna Honda Hospital	37°44′51.93″N 122°27′26.24″W	Cast stone, stucco	90 x 36 x 24 in.	San Francisco Arts Commission

== Golden Gate Park ==
Title	Image	Artist	Year	Location	Coordinates	Material	Dimensions	Owner
Beethoven		Henry Baerer	Original bust 1884, installed 1915	Golden Gate Park	37°46′10.52″N 122°28′4.4″W	Bronze	50 x 30 x 18 in.	San Francisco Arts Commission
Roald Amundsen		Sigvald Asbjornsen	ca. 1914-1920 or 1929	Golden Gate Park	37°46′11.76″N 122°30′37.56″W	Bronze	H. 2 1/2 x W. 2 1/2 ft.	San Francisco Arts Commission
Horse		Vet Anderson		Horseshoe Courts, Golden Gate Park	37°46′24.98″N 122°27′20.73″W	Concrete	144 x 224 x 24 in.	City of San Francisco
Horseshoe Pitcher		Vet Anderson		Horseshoe Courts, Golden Gate Park		Concrete	135 x 133 x 10 in.	City of San Francisco
Thomas Starr King		Daniel Chester French		Golden Gate Park	37°46′20.24″N 122°27′58.59″W	Bronze	H. 9 ft. x W. 4 1/2 ft.	San Francisco Arts Commission
Thomas Garrigue Masaryk		J. Matatka	1926	Golden Gate Park	37°46′16.53″N 122°28′15.42″W	Bronze	20 x 11 x 12 in.	San Francisco Arts Commission
Roman Gladiator		George Geefs	1881	Golden Gate Park	37°46′18.18″N 122°28′5.65″W	Bronze	100 x 36 1/4 x 33 in.	San Francisco Arts Commission
Young Girl		Jack Moxom	ca. 1939	Sharon Meadow, Golden Gate Park		Sandstone	4 ft. x 20 in. x 14 in.	San Francisco Arts Commission

== Hayes Valley ==
Title	Image	Artist	Year	Location	Coordinates	Material	Dimensions	Owner
Balanced-Unbalanced: Balanced-Unbalanced T		Fletcher Benton	1980	Davies Symphony Hall	37°46′38.85″N 122°25′12.16″W	Steel & enamel	161 1/4 x 130 x 134 in.	San Francisco Museum of Modern Art
Large Four Piece Reclining Figure		Henry Moore	1972	Davies Symphony Hall	37°46′41.16″N 122°25′12.16″W	Bronze	H. 6 1/2 x W. 4 ft. x D. 13 1/2 ft.	San Francisco Arts Commission
Untitled		Sidney Gordin	1969	Davies Symphony Hall		Bronze	8 ft. 5 in. x 5 ft. 8 in. x 4 ft. 3 in.	San Francisco Arts Commission

== Inner Sunset ==
Title	Image	Artist	Year	Location	Coordinates	Material	Dimensions	Owner
Bear		Benny Bufano	ca. 1930s	UCSF Medical Center	37°45′46.85″N 122°27′35.72″W	Cast granite	6 ft. x 30 in. x 7 ft.	San Francisco Arts Commission
Bear and Cubs		Benny Bufano	1968	UCSF Medical Center	37°45′47.56″N 122°27′32.07″W	Granite	5 ft. x 30 in. x 40 in.	University of California, San Francisco

== Lake Merced ==
Title	Image	Artist	Year	Location	Coordinates	Material	Dimensions	Owner
Captain Juan Bautista de Anza		Julian Martinez (sculptor)	1967	Lake Merced	37°43′42.01″N 122°29′37″W	Bronze	H. 12 ft.	San Francisco Arts Commission
Penguin's Prayer		Benny Bufano	1976	Lake Merced	37°42′47.29″N 122°29′7.32″W	Granite	17 ft. x 70 in. x 70 in.	San Francisco Arts Commission

== Lincoln Park ==
Title	Image	Artist	Year	Location	Coordinates	Material	Dimensions	Owner
The Thinker		Auguste Rodin	1924	California Palace of the Legion of Honor	37°47′5.11″N 122°30′1.7″W	Bronze	78 x 51 x 52 3/4 in.	San Francisco Arts Commission

== Mission District ==
Title	Image	Artist	Year	Location	Coordinates	Material	Dimensions	Owner
Balmy Alley		Las Mujeres Muralistas and other local artists	1972	Between 24th Street and Garfield Square.	37°45′06″N 122°24′45″W	Paint		
Clarion Alley Murals		Clarion Alley Mural Project	1992	Between 17th and 18th streets, and Mission and Valencia streets	37°45'46.8"N 122°25'14.3"W	Paint		
Father Junipero Serra		Arthur Putnam	1909	Mission San Francisco de Asís	37°45′50.57″N 122°25′37″W	Cast stone	H. 6 ft. 6 in.	Archbishop of San Francisco
Golden Fire Hydrant		M. Greenberg's Sons created the original hydrant. Painted with a fresh coat of gold paint each April 18 by the community.	First honored after the 1906 San Francisco Earthquake. Dedicated 1966	On the southwest corner of 20th and Church streets	37°45'29.0"N 122°25'40.8"W	Cast iron and gold paint	3 ft. tall	
Miguel Hidalgo Statue		Juan F. Olaguibel.	1962	Mission Dolores Park	37°45'34.6"N 122°25'38.1"W	Bronze on a marble base with a brass plaque		

== Nob Hill ==
Title	Image	Artist	Year	Location	Coordinates	Material	Dimensions	Owner
Bret Harte Memorial		Jo Mora	1919	Bohemian Club		Bronze	3 ft. 3 7/8 in. x 7 ft. 11 5/8 in. x 2 1/2 in.	Bohemian Club
Doors of Paradise (after Lorenzo Ghiberti)		Bruno Bearzi	1964	Grace Cathedral	37°47′31″N 122°24′47″W	Gilded bronze	16 ft. 2 in. x 4 ft. 7 in. x 4 in.	Episcopal Diocese of California

== Noe Valley ==
Title	Image	Artist	Year	Location	Coordinates	Material	Dimensions	Owner
Outdoor Wall Mosaic		Lois Anderson	1987	Douglass Dog Park		Tile, glass, found objects	37 x 33 x 1 in.	San Francisco Arts Commission

== North Beach ==
Title	Image	Artist	Year	Location	Coordinates	Material	Dimensions	Owner
Guglielmo Marconi Memorial Plaque		Raymond Puccinelli	1938	Lombard St. & Telegraph Hill Rd.	37°48′12.81″N 122°24′23.33″W	Bronze	D. 3/4 in. x Diam. 30 in.	San Francisco Arts Commission

== Parkmerced ==
Title	Image	Artist	Year	Location	Coordinates	Material	Dimensions	Owner
Peace		Benny Bufano	1939		37°42′53.19″N 122°28′33.21″W	Granite, tile, stainless steel	H. 26 1/2 ft. x Diam. 10 ft.	San Francisco Arts Commission

== Richmond District ==
Title	Image	Artist	Year	Location	Coordinates	Material	Dimensions	Owner
Louis Pasteur		Harriet G. Moore	1984	French Campus of Kaiser Permanente's San Francisco Medical Center, 4131 Geary		Bronze	23 x 16 x 12 in.	French Heritage Alliance

== Rincon Hill ==
Title	Image	Artist	Year	Location	Coordinates	Material	Dimensions	Owner
Andrew Furuseth		Hal Bayard-Runyon	1940	Sailors' Union of the Pacific Building	37°47′11.28″N 122°23′34.02″W	Bronze	approx. 24 x 20 x 16 in.	San Francisco Arts Commission
Harry Lundeberg (1901-1957)		E. Hunt	1957	Sailors' Union of the Pacific Building	37°47′11.19″N 122°23′33.65″W	Bronze	30 x 24 x 24 in.	San Francisco Arts Commission
Smile		John Seward Johnson II	1957	201 Spear St.		Bronze	5 ft. 9 in. x 1 ft. 8 in. x 3 ft.	Compass Management and Leasing
Tau		Roger Berry	1974	160 Spear St.	37°47′29.94″N 122°23′35.77″W	Stainless steel	H. 6 ft. x D. 5 ft.	Vintage Properties

== San Francisco State University ==
Title	Image	Artist	Year	Location	Coordinates	Material	Dimensions	Owner
Granite Nude Torso		Benny Bufano	1934	San Francisco State University		Granite	41 x 23 x 15 in.	San Francisco Arts Commission
St. Francis		Benny Bufano	1938	San Francisco State University		Red marble	34 x 37 x 22 in.	San Francisco Arts Commission

== SoMA ==
Title	Image	Artist	Year	Location	Coordinates	Material	Dimensions	Owner
Tau		Roger Berry	1984	160 Spear Street		Stainless steel	Overall approx: H. 6 ft. x D. 5 ft.; Circular disc: approx. D. l ft. 2 in. with approx. diam: 8 ft.; Base: approx. H. 1 ft. 4 in.	Vintage Properties

== Tenderloin ==
Title	Image	Artist	Year	Location	Coordinates	Material	Dimensions	Owner
Redding School, Self-Portrait		Ruth Asawa	1984	Alfred Boeddeker Recreation Center	37°47′3.71″N 122°24′42.9″W	Reinforced concrete	4 ft. x 16 1/2 ft. x 2 1/4 in.	San Francisco Arts Commission

== Union Square ==
Title	Image	Artist	Year	Location	Coordinates	Material	Dimensions	Owner
Ruth Asawa's San Francisco Fountain		Ruth Asawa	1969-1970	Grand Hyatt San Francisco		Bronze	H. 90 in. x Diam. 193 in.	Hyatt

== University of San Francisco ==
Title	Image	Artist	Year	Location	Coordinates	Material	Dimensions	Owner
Rev. Anthony Joseph Maraschi, S. J.		Harriet G. Moore	1985	University of San Francisco		Bronze	22 1/2 x 21 x 13 in.	University of San Francisco
Tides		Yoko Kubrick	2019	University of San Francisco	37.77851, -122.4519	Marble	H 48 x 55 x 53 in	University of San Francisco
