= Waterfront Park (San Francisco) =

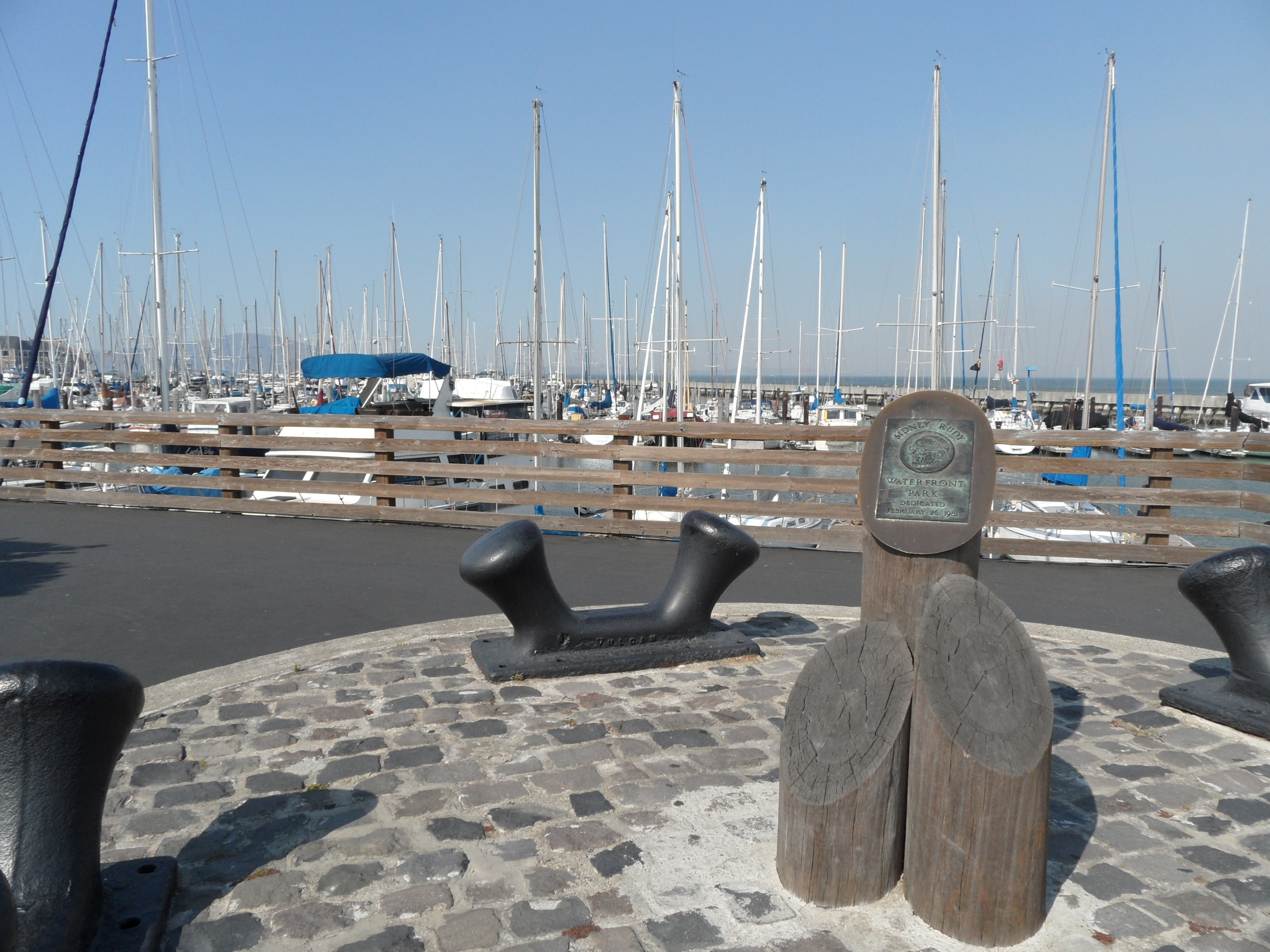
- Skygate sculpture
- Interactive map of Waterfront Park
- Nearest city: San Francisco, California, U.S.
- Coordinates: 37.80818°N 122.40842°W

Waterfront Park is a park along San Francisco's Embarcadero, near Pier 39, in the U.S. state of California. The park, established in 1976, is owned by the Port Authority. The park is home to the Skygate sculpture.

== See also ==
- List of parks in San Francisco
