= San Francisco Comfort Women Memorial =

Memorial in the United States

- Interactive map of San Francisco Comfort Women Memorial
- Location: San Francisco
- Coordinates: 37.791822°N 122.404513°W
- Designer: Steven Whyte
- Type: Memorial
- Material: Bronze
- Height: 10 feet
- Opening date: September 22nd, 2017
- Dedicated to: Comfort women before and during World War II

The San Francisco Comfort Women memorial is a monument dedicated to comfort women before and during World War II. It is built in remembrance of the girls and women that were sexually enslaved by the Imperial Japanese Army through deceit, coercion, and brutal force. It is approximated that there were around 400,000 "comfort women" from Korea, Taiwan, China, Indonesia, the Philippines and other Asian countries. The site is located near the Saint Mary's Square, at the crossroads of San Francisco Chinatown and the Financial District. The statue "Comfort Women" Column of Strength, by sculptor Steven Whyte, is one of nine and the first sculpture placed in a major U.S. city to commemorate the comfort women.

In 2017, in protest of the memorial, Hirofumi Yoshimura—the mayor of Osaka, Japan—dissolved the sister-city relationship between Osaka and San Francisco that was established in 1957.

== Column of Strength statue ==
The San Francisco Comfort Women memorial and its bronze, 10-foot-tall "Comfort Women" Column of Strength statue were unveiled on September 22, 2017. The memorial statue was designed by the Carmel-based sculptor Steven Whyte. It depicts three teen-age girls, with each being of a specific nationality—Chinese, Korean, and Philippine—and altogether representing the estimated 200,000 "comfort women" from countries across East and Southeast Asia that were occupied by the Imperial Japanese Army before and during World War II. These three girls are cast in bronze, standing in a circle atop a pedestal and holding hands in a back-to-back posture. Standing next to the pedestal and gazing up at them is another bronze figure of a halmoni (Korean for grandmother). It bears a resemblance to the Korean human rights activist Kim Hak-Sun, who was a victim of the forced enslavement to the Imperial Japanese Army during WWII and the first woman in Korea to come forward publicly about her experiences as a comfort woman.

== Steven Whyte ==
Steven Whyte, the sculptor of the "Comfort Women" Column of Strength statue, is a British-American artist living in Carmel, California. His works also include a life-sized Jumbo the Elephant at Tufts University and a multi-sculptures monument entitled National Salute to Bob Hope and the Military.

Whyte describes himself as "a figurative sculptor," with a strong emphasis on the creation of characters in his works. He has a preference in human form as the sculpture subject, and often works with live models when designing sculptures. For "Comfort Women" Column of Strength, he found models from the Central Coast and designed the figures of the teen-age Chinese, Korean, and Philippine girls partially based on the models.

Whyte also describes himself as a "sculptor of people" who prioritizes "the emotional quality and impact of the sculpture" and intends for his work to become catalysts for public responses, interactions, and conversations. To make "Comfort Women" Column of Strength resonate with its audience emotionally, Whyte puts an emphasis on the girls’ strength and solidarity through their posture, and makes them look at viewers directly "in an almost accusatory way" and with "post-traumatic" stress and shock.

Whyte reflects on the Column of Strength statue that "this is a story that has been hidden for so long that if it serves a purpose —to make people look into history and learn from history a little more— then my work is done."

== Development ==
In 2015, the San Francisco Board of Supervisors unanimously passed the resolution to build a memorial dedicated to comfort women, under the push led by retired judges Lillian Sing and Julie Tang. According to District 1 Supervisor Eric Mar, the memorial is expected to serve as the starting point for education and healing process, with an aim to "keep the issue alive when some in Japan are trying to silence the issue."

The memorial is privately funded by the Comfort Women Justice Coalition and was established in cooperation with other community organizations and city agencies. The organization raised $205,000 to make and install the statue. In a double-blind competition, British-American artist Steven Whyte’s design was chosen from more than 30 submissions from all over the world by an expert jury of arts professionals, community organizers and citizens. Whyte was then tasked with sculpting the memorial piece. The sculpture was installed on September 22, 2017.

During the design process, the sensitivity of the controversial issue was taken into consideration and the statue was designed not to display any violence or brutality. The memorial statue was given the name Women's Column of Strength, and represents the young girls and women taken from China, Korea, and the Philippines, as well as to bring awareness to the sex trafficking of women during wartime.

== Controversy ==
Under the 2015 agreement, Japan contributed ¥1 billion to a South Korean foundation for former comfort women, and both governments stated that the issue would be resolved “finally and irreversibly.

This is due to the different purpose of attending the agreement and a different view of the nature of this issue between the two groups, the Korean victims and Japan.

The victims’ core demand was for Japan to “painfully acknowledge its moral and legal responsibility,” but Japan uniformly and repeatedly stated that there is no legal responsibility, avoiding the fundamentals of the issue. The victims also demanded an irreversible apology from the Japanese government following the ‘Cabinet decision’, but again, Japan avoided the formalities. In addition, the apology was not directly delivered to the victims, leaving the sincerity question.

The victims agreed to receive 100 million won (approx. $89,686) each and 20 million won (approx. $17,937) for the dead as compensation. However, immediately after the agreement, Japan insisted that the nature of the money paid would “not be reparation based on any legal responsibility.” As the Korean government has not sought the victims’ opinion on the amount of money during the negotiation process and the fundamental problem, as well as the issue of “legal responsibility,” would not be resolved without Japan's will to apologize, the majority of victims decided that they would not take any money other than in a form of compensation.

Japan on the other hand rejects that it is responsible in the first place. Japan claims that the comfort women were recruited by Korean pimps doing business and that the Japanese Imperial Forces supervised, but were not the “pivot of operation” of the comfort stations.

In 2017, after the unveiling ceremony of "Comfort Women" Column of Strength, and in light of San Francisco's recognition of the memorial and its statue, Hirofumi Yoshimura—the mayor of Osaka, Japan—protested and threatened to end the sisterhood between the two cities of Osaka and San Francisco.

According to the Japanese national newspaper Asahi Shimbun, Yoshimura contended that the relationship between Osaka and San Francisco of trust was "completely destroyed" by the placement of the statue. He argued that the memorial was unnecessary because Japan has already made amends regarding the issue of comfort women. Yoshimura also made the objection that the comfort women statue unfairly singles out Japan for wartime atrocities.

He said that "I am in favor of activities to protect the dignity and human rights of women. However, if the purpose is to protect the human rights of women, I would suggest that some of the special attention currently being given to Japan’s ‘comfort women’ issue should be broadened to memorialize all the women who have been sexually assaulted and abused by soldiers of countries in the world." Yoshimura formally withdrew sister city status from San Francisco in October, 2018.

The installation of the San Francisco statue worried some Japanese-Americans who felt it stigmatized the community and offered only a one-sided account to the comfort women story. Retired California judge and current chairman of the Comfort Women Justice Coalition, Julie Tang, refuted this claim by stating the memorial statue tackles the issue of women's freedom from sexual violence, such as through rape and assault during wartime.

== See also ==
- Filipina Comfort Women Statue
- Statue of Peace
