= Filipina Comfort Women =

Bronze sculpture dedicated to Filipino comfort women

- Manila Comfort Women Memorial as of December 2017
- Artist: Jonas Roces
- Medium: Bronze
- Subject: Filipino "comfort women"
- Dimensions: 2 m (6.56 ft)
- Condition: Lost (stolen)
- Location: Manila (2017–2018) Antipolo, Rizal (as of 2018) Unknown (stolen after its transfer to Antipolo)
- Owner: Manuel Chua of Tulay Foundation

Filipina Comfort Women was a statue publicly displayed along Baywalk, Roxas Boulevard in Manila. Unveiled on December 8, 2017, and installed through the National Historical Commission of the Philippines (NHCP) and other donors and foundations, it was dedicated to the Filipino "comfort women", who worked in military brothels in World War II including those who were coerced into doing so.

Since its installation in Manila it has garnered support from concerned groups, and criticism from government agencies. The statue was removed on April 27, 2018, which has received backlash. It has since been stored in the private studio of its artist, Jonas Roces, in Antipolo, Rizal, but was later stolen.

== Composition ==
The statue consists of a bronze statue designed by Jonas Roces and a historical marker installed by the NHCP. The statue took three months to complete.

The bronze statue is two meters tall, depicting a representation of an estimated 1,000 Filipinas who have undergone sexual slavery during World War II. It depicts a grieving blindfolded woman in traditional Maria Clara attire. The pedestal features the historical marker on its front, while its back cites the effort and donations of groups and individuals. On the base of the backside is a small plaque, with the title of the statue as "Filipina Comfort Women" and the name of its designer.

Roces has insisted that the statue is not made as means to protest against either the government of Japan and the Philippines but as a "reminder" of Philippine history that he wanted future generations not to forget. Aside from the sculpture as a whole symbolizing the Filipino comfort women, the statue's other elements had symbolism. According to the sculpture's artist, the blindfold represents "injustice or the continuous desire for justice" of surviving comfort women who are seeking a satisfactory official apology and compensation from the Japanese government. The comfort women's resilience is signified by the sculpture's dress which is embellished with images of the coral vine, a perennial plant also known locally as the "cadena de amor". The position of the statue when it was still installed in Manila was a reference to Japan's title as the "Land of the Rising Sun"; the statue did not face the sea where the sun sets.

== History ==
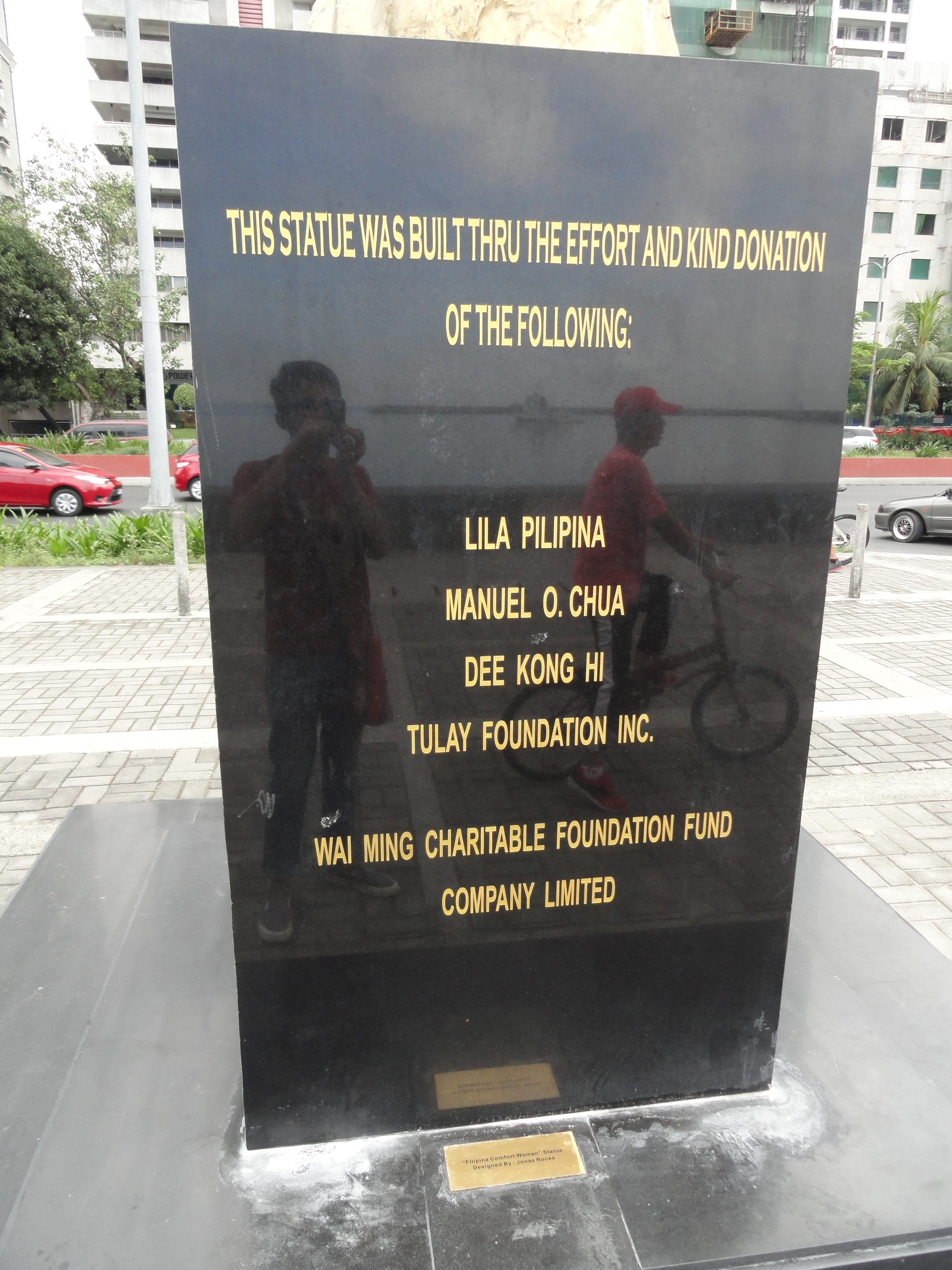
List of donors and partners.

=== Pre-installation ===
Before the statue's installation, a historical marker remembering the comfort women was installed along Liwasang Bonifacio by the city government of Manila on April 22, 2003. It was unveiled by then-Mayor Lito Atienza.

The statue was commissioned by Manuel Chua of Tulay Foundation, Inc. After Chua's death, the NHCP successfully sought Teresita Ang See approval for the statue's installation. Other donors and partners, according to its pedestal backside, include Lila Pilipina, Manuel O. Chua, Dee Kong Hi, and Wai Ming Charitable Foundation Fund Company Limited.

Around 2014, the Tulay Foundation approached the Manila city government to request a place, where the statue could be installed.

=== Installation ===
The National Historical Commission of the Philippines led the installation of the Filipino Comfort Woman Statue with the city government of Manila providing a place for the statue as well as technical support. The statue was formally unveiled on December 8, 2017.

=== Reception ===
Days after the installation, the statue caught the attention of the Philippine Department of Foreign Affairs (DFA) which formally sought an explanation from officials of Manila City Hall and the NHCP regarding details of the installation of the statue through a letter tagged as "extremely urgent". The DFA cites the sensitivity of the "comfort women issue" within domestic matters and bilateral affairs with Japan. Officials from the Japanese embassy also went to the Manila City Hall. The city government of Manila said that it only provided the space, while the NHCP facilitated its installation.

Seiko Noda, the Japanese minister for Internal Affairs and Communications, aired her dismay to Philippine President Rodrigo Duterte. Teresita Ang See, a prominent member of the Filipino-Chinese community wrote to the DFA, and said that the statue is not meant as an insult against the Japanese people. She also said that this serves as a timely memorial, given that many women have come out in the West against violence upon them.

In January 2018, Duterte said that he respects the freedom of expression of groups for this statue. However, Foreign Affairs Secretary Alan Peter Cayetano aired his grievances over the Philippines' relationship with Japan.

=== Removal from site in Manila ===
On April 27, 2018, the Department of Public Works and Highways (DPWH) removed the statue, along with two others, for a drainage improvement project along the Baywalk. Many individuals and groups, including Gabriela Women's Party condemned the removal, stating their opposition to historical revisionism and submission to Japanese policy. They also stated that this has been an unlawful removal, since the heritage act protects markers and memorials by the NHCP. President Duterte remarked that the memorial can be placed in a private property, since the state would not want to "antagonize" other countries.

On May 10, 2018, Representatives Emmi De Jesus and Arlene Brosas, both from the Gabriela Women's Party filed House Resolution 1859, directing a probe by the House of Representatives, specifically, the House committee on foreign affairs, on the issue of removal. The resolution states that it is in violation of laws and it is a dishonor on the memory and experiences of the comfort women. Moreover, it also states its relation with the pressure, especially with the earlier installation of similar statues in the United States and South Korea.

=== Transfer to Antipolo ===
After the statue was removed from its former site in Manila, the statue was transported to Antipolo, Rizal. The sculpture was stored inside the private studio of its artist, Jonas Roces. The statue was given to its artist for repair, while the project's funders looked for a possible new location for the artwork.

=== Theft ===
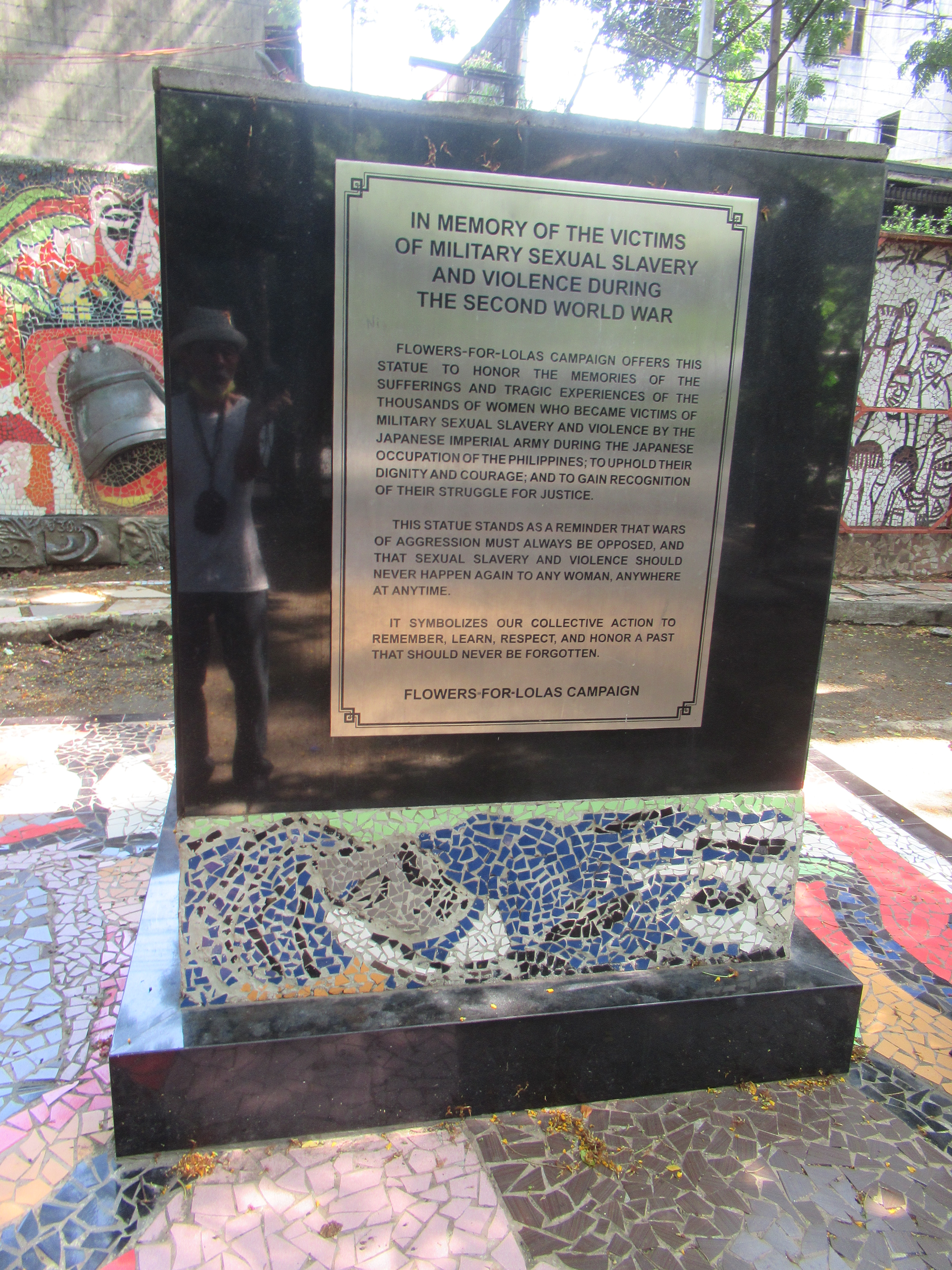
Flower-for-Lolas Campaign Monument at the Baclaran Church.

By August 2019, the statue went missing. After the funders of the Filipina Comfort Women found a new location for the statue at Baclaran Church, they contacted Jonas Roces but the sculptor failed to show up and claimed that the statue was "stolen" from his studio.

== Memorial marker ==
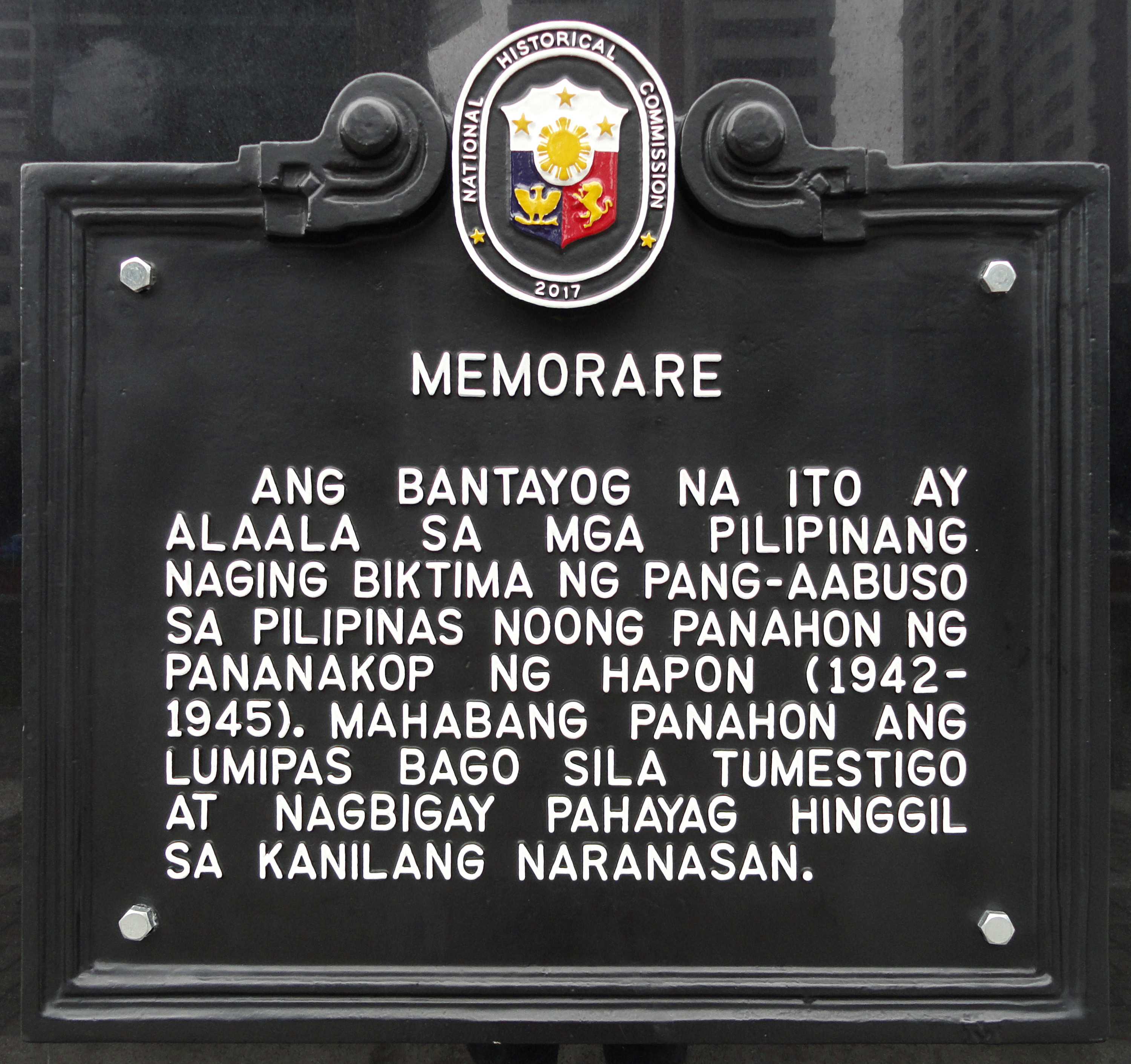
Historical marker attached to the pedestal

The marker, entitled Memorare, was installed by the NHCP along with the statue. The marker text is written in Filipino.

| Original Filipino Text | Translated English Text |
|---|---|
| Ang bantayog na ito ay alaala sa mga Pilipinang naging biktima ng pang-aabuso sa Pilipinas noong panahon ng pananakop ng Hapon (1942–1945). Mahabang panahon ang lumipas bago sila tumestigo at nagbigay pahayag hinggil sa kanilang naranasan. | This monument is a memory of all the Filipino women who became victims of abuse during the Japanese occupation (1942–1945). It took them a long time before they testified and gave their statements regarding their experience. |

== See also ==
- Statue of Peace
- San Francisco Comfort Women Memorial
- Historical markers of the Philippines
- Historical markers of the Philippines in Metro Manila
- Japan–Philippines relations
- Japanese occupation of the Philippines
- Japanese War Crimes
- Malaya Lolas
