= Bust of Tomáš Garrigue Masaryk (San Francisco) =

Sculpture in San Francisco, California, U.S.

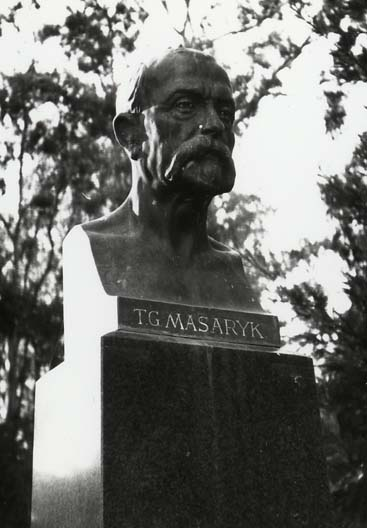
- Artist: Josef Mařatka
- Subject: Tomáš Garrigue Masaryk
- Location: Golden Gate Park, San Francisco, California, U.S.; 37°46′17.2″N 122°28′15.5″W

A bust of Tomáš Garrigue Masaryk by Josef Mařatka is installed in San Francisco's Golden Gate Park, in the state of California.
