= Robert Royston =

American architect (1918–2008)

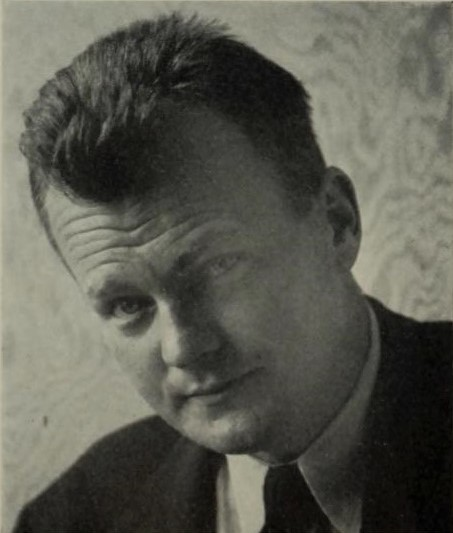
Robert Royston, c. 1946

Eckbo, Dean, Williams, Royston

Robert N. Royston (1918 – September 19, 2008) was one of America's most distinguished landscape architects, based in the San Francisco Bay Area of California in the United States. His design work and university teaching in the years following World War II helped define and establish the California modernism style in the post-war period. During his sixty years of professional practice Royston completed an array of award-winning projects that ranged from residential gardens to regional land use plans. He is perhaps best known for his important innovations in park design. A recent book, Modern Public Gardens: Robert Royston and the Suburban Park, details this area of his professional creativity and philosophy.

== Early life ==
Royston was born in 1918 in San Francisco, California. He grew up on a farm in the Santa Clara Valley of Northern California in the town on Morgan Hill. As a high school student he demonstrated a talent for drawing, dramatic performance, and athletics. One teacher advised him to be either an attorney or a ballet dancer. He pursued instead his interest in design and the outdoors and upon graduation in 1936 enrolled in the program for "Landscape Design" in the College of Environmental Design at the University of California, Berkeley.

Royston's mentor, H. Leland Vaughan, allowed him to experiment on his own with the new design perspectives emerging in the innovative work of Thomas Church and the more avant-garde explorations of Daniel Kiley, Garrett Eckbo, and James Rose. Royston's interest in painting, which he continued to pursue in order to explore aesthetic principles applicable to his design work, can be traced to the studio art classes that were a part of his early education.

While working his way through college, Royston was employed part-time in the office of Thomas Church and upon graduation in 1940 became a full-time employee. At the time Church was expanding his practice, which had been centered primarily on residential gardens, to include the design of larger-scale planned residential communities and college campuses. Young Royston was given major responsibilities on such San Francisco projects as the Valencia Gardens Housing Project in the Mission District (by architect William Wurster), the Potrero Hill Housing project, and the large Park Merced Apartment complex near the Pacific Ocean. He also was an early member of 'Telesis', an informal group of designers concerned with environmental problems of the San Francisco Bay Area. Here he met several of the architects he was later to collaborate with on various projects as well as his future professional partner, Garrett Eckbo.

With the outbreak of World War II, Royston volunteered for the Navy and served as a junior officer in the Pacific theatre. In his spare time aboard ship, Royston experimented with design ideas, building models of residential gardens and creating jewelry out of scrap materials. In 1945 Royston returned to the Bay Area and accepted Garrett Eckbo's invitation to form a partnership with him and landscape architect Edward Williams. The new firm, Eckbo, Royston, and Williams, eventually established offices in San Francisco and Los Angeles.

In 1947 Royston accepted a teaching position at the University of California Berkeley while continuing his professional practice. His students included both architects and landscape architects. His teaching career at Berkeley ended in 1951 when he resigned after refusing to sign a loyalty oath. Soon after leaving Berkeley, he accepted a part-time position at Stanford University and later at North Carolina State University. Over the course of his career he taught and lectured at over twenty-five colleges and universities in the United States.

== Career ==
Royston's early professional work was concentrated in Northern California and at first consisted mostly of residential site planning and garden design. This was a period of astronomical growth fueled by the post-War economic boom and an acute shortage of housing. Most of this growth occurred as low- density suburban development, where Royston did much of his work. His practice soon expanded to include parks, plazas, and planned residential communities. Royston collaborated on numerous residential projects with many notable San Francisco Bay Area architects. His site plans emphasized the integration of indoor and outdoor space and elegant, functional garden rooms for outdoor living. Royston's specific design vocabulary of layered, non-axial spaces and bold asymmetrical arcs and polygons suggests such influences as analytical cubism, biomorphism, and the rectilinear geometry of Mondrian's paintings. The approach to architectural space of Mies van der Rohe and Le Corbusier are also clearly visible. Royston regards space as the primary medium of design and insists on the absolute necessity of integrating design form with human use. For example, in a typical Royston park design, a wading pool for young children may be laid out as a visually engaging biomorphic form but at the same time is scaled to the distance a parent's voice can reach. The depth of the pool would also reflect function over pure form in that it would be shallowest in the middle where the child is farthest from parental aid. In Royston's design vocabulary there is no art for art's sake. Design form is always directly related to use and the psychological effect of space on its participants.

For Royston, landscape architecture "Practices the fine art of relating the structure of culture to the nature of landscape, to the end that people can use it, enjoy it, and preserve it."

In dealing with more complex projects such as planned residential communities, Royston developed early in his practice his concept of the "landscape matrix," which he defines as "the linking of open space as a continuous system throughout the community establishing a strong framework whereby communities are controlled and given form." An early application of the 'landscape matrix' was the plan for a 258-acre (1.04 km^{2}) cooperative housing project, 'Ladera' (1946), near Portola Valley, California. Royston's design featured a linear park which tied together the residential clusters and separated automobile and pedestrian circulation. The plan was built, but not according to Royston's specifications.

== Park work ==
Royston's innovative park work also began during the 1950s. His first major commission was the Standard Oil Rod and Gun Club (1950) located at the Standard Oil Refinery near Point Richmond, California, and was a recreation facility for workers at the refinery. Royston's carefully zoned design provided a gymnasium, swimming pools, imaginatively designed custom play equipment, family picnic areas, and several multi-use areas in a series of skillfully layered spaces on the site of a former skeet range and fishing pier. The biomorphic forms he employed were reminiscent of his residential design work. The facility was an immediate success and attracted the attention of the Bay Area planners representing several municipalities. Royston soon was given important park and playground commissions, many of which gained attention in the national media.

Among his more important works were Krusi Park in Alameda, California; Pixie Park in Ross, California; Bowden and Mitchell parks in Palo Alto, California (1956); and, later, Santa Clara's Central Park (1960). Royston rejected the notion of parks as primarily outdoor gymnasiums catering to a narrow range of age groups. He envisioned parks as "public gardens" serving a wide range of users, including families, very young children, and the elderly. Many of his parks contain residential scale elements such as pergolas and enclosed patio-like areas that create a sense of familiarity and intimacy. Royston also designed urban plazas, such as San Francisco's Portsmouth Square and Saint Mary's Square city parks. (1952).

In 1958 Royston amicably left the firm of Eckbo, Royston, Williams, and formed a new professional office with Asa Hanamoto. The firm developed into Royston, Hanamoto, Alley and Abey (RHAA) which is still in existence today.

== Awards ==
Robert Royston was the recipient of many professional awards, including Fellow of the American Society of Landscape Architects, 1975, The American Institute of Architects Medal in 1978, and in 1989 the American Society of Landscape Architects Medal, the highest award of that professional organization.

== Designs ==
Royston designs that can be visited and are reasonably intact:

- Saint Mary's Square, San Francisco
- Mitchell Park, Palo Alto, California
- Bowden Park, Palo Alto, California
- Central Park, Santa Clara, California
- Cuesta Park, Mountain View, California
- Santa Clara Civic Center, Santa Clara, California
- Upper Quarry Amphitheater (UC Santa Cruz), Santa Cruz, California

== Additional reading ==
- Rainey, Reuben M. and JC Miller, Modern Public Gardens: Robert Royston and the Suburban Park, William Stout Publishers, San Francisco 2006
- Robert Royston on Landscape Architecture:
  - "Is There a Bay Area Style?" Architecture Record, 105 (May 1949), p. 96.
  - "Looking Down on the San Francisco Bay Area," Landscape Architecture, Vol. 64:4 (July 1974), pp. 234–243.
  - "Getting the Feel for a New Town Site and Its Design," Landscape Architecture, Vol. 66:5 (Spring 1976), pp. 432–443.
  - "Point of View," Landscape Architecture, Vol. 76:6 (November 1986), pp. 66–67
  - "A Brief History," Landscape Australia, Vol. 8:1 (Fall 1986), pp. 34–36, 38.
  - "Robert Royston's Thoughts on Landscape Architecture," Landscape Australia, Vol. 8:2 (Winter 1986), pp. 152–164.
- Robert Royston's collected papers and design drawings, located in the Environmental Design Archives at the University of California, Berkeley
