= Statue of Sun Yat-sen (San Francisco) =

Statue of Sun Yat-sen by Beniamino Bufano in San Francisco, California, U.S.

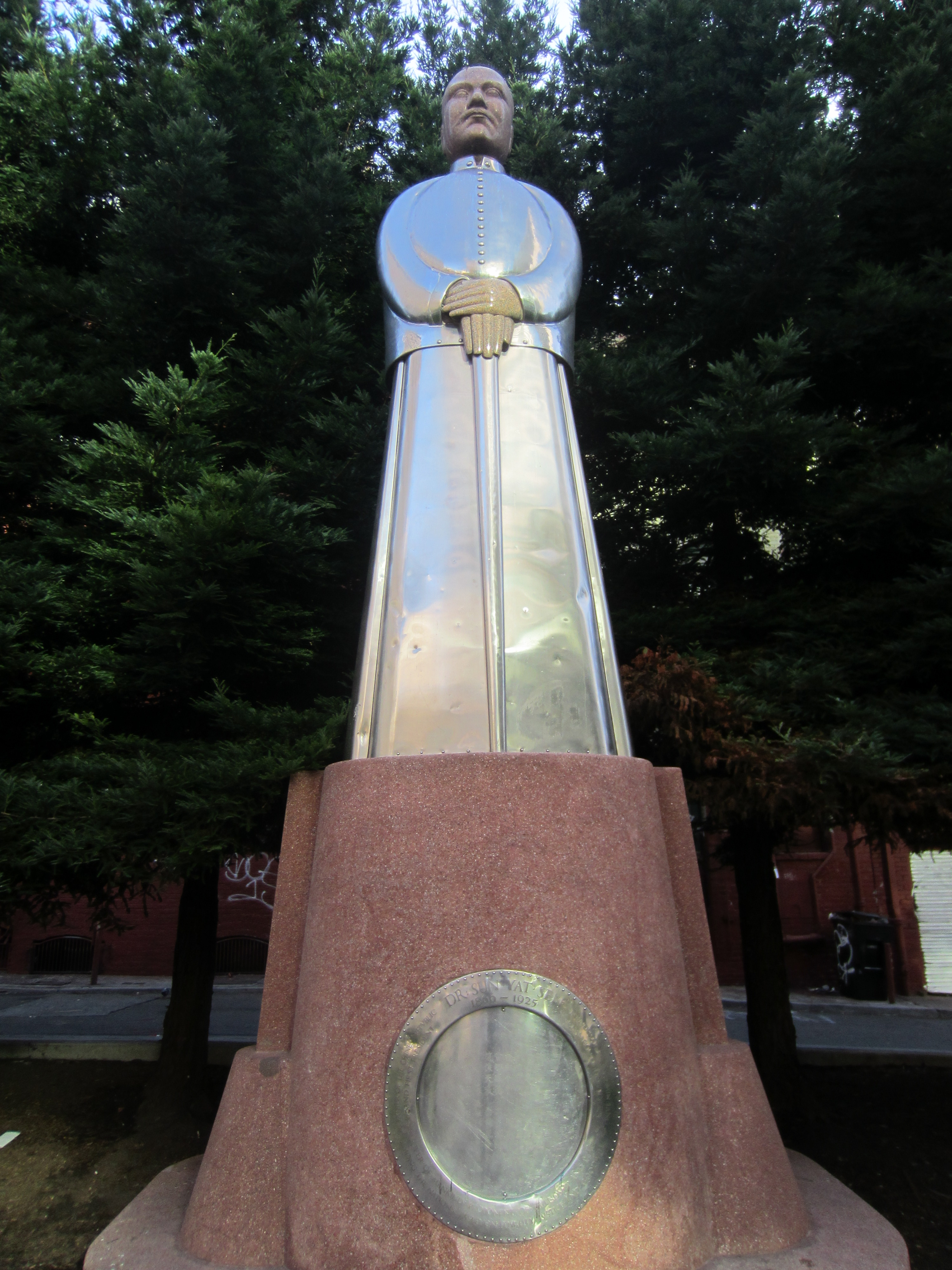
- The statue in 2013
- Artist: Beniamino Bufano
- Year: 1937
- Medium: Sculpture
- Subject: Sun Yat-sen
- Location: San Francisco, California, United States; 37.79203°N 122.4055°W

Sun Yat-sen is an outdoor sculpture depicting the Chinese physician, writer, and philosopher of the same name by Beniamino Bufano, installed in San Francisco's Saint Mary's Square, in 1937, in the U.S. state of California.
