= Untitled (Gordin) =

Sculpture by Sidney Gordin in San Francisco, California, U.S.

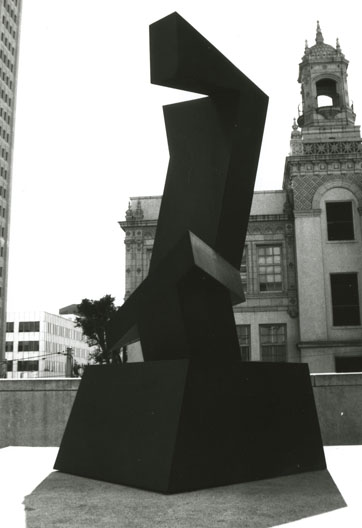
- The sculpture in 2011
- Artist: Sidney Gordin
- Year: 1969
- Medium: Bronze sculpture
- Location: San Francisco, California, United States
- 37.777417°N 122.420062°W

Untitled is a 1969 bronze sculpture by artist Sidney Gordin, installed outside San Francisco's Louise M. Davies Symphony Hall, in the U.S. state of California.

== Description and history ==
The abstract sculpture, installed at the corner of Van Ness Avenue and Hayes, outside Louise M. Davies Symphony Hall, measures 8 ft. 5 in. x 5 ft. 8 in. x 4 ft. 3 in. It rests on a concrete base measuring approximately 16.5 in. x 11 ft. x 11 ft. The sculpture's plaque reads: "SIDNEY GORDIN / AMERICAN born Russia, 1918 / UNTITLED / 1969 / bronze / San Francisco Art Commission".

Untitled has been on extended loan to the Hall since 1981, and was previously on loan to the San Francisco Museum of Modern Art. The artwork was surveyed by the Smithsonian Institution's "Save Outdoor Sculpture!" program in 1993.

== See also ==
- 1969 in art
