= Josef Mařatka =

Czech sculptor (1874–1937)

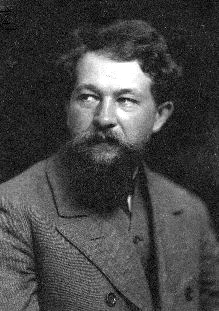
Josef Mařatka (date unknown)

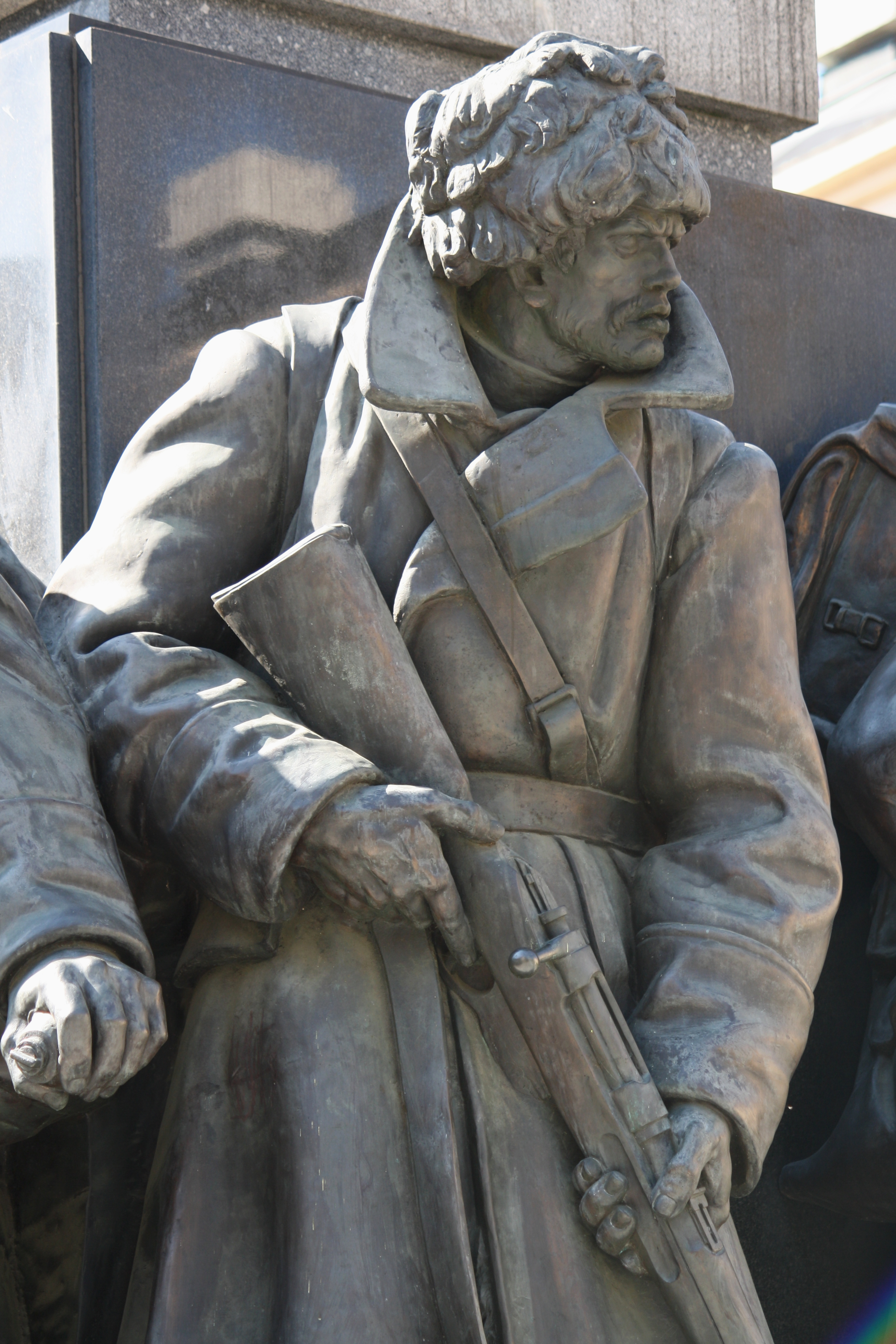
A restored figure from "Prague's Victorious Sons"

Josef Mařatka (21 May 1874 – 20 April 1937) was a Czech sculptor. His work was influenced by Antoine Bourdelle.

== Life ==
Josef Mařatka was born in Prague on 21 May 1874. His father, Wilhelm Mařatka, was a shoemaker. From 1889 to 1896, he studied at the School of Applied Arts under Celda Klouček, who was a paleontologist as well as a sculptor. In 1899, he attended the Academy of Fine Arts, where he studied with Josef Václav Myslbek. The following year, he went to Paris and was briefly employed in the studios of Auguste Rodin. His first exhibition was held in Prague in 1902. He married Zdeňka Procházková (1890–1980) in 1912. Their son, Zdeněk, became a prominent gastroenterologist.

He began by responding to the influences he had absorbed from the expressionist movement, incorporating elements of symbolism and Art Nouveau. His most important work from this period is the Opuštěna Ariadna (Abandoned Ariadne, 1903). He later came under the influence of Antoine Bourdelle. After World War I, he returned to the styles he had learned from Myslbek, combining Neoclassicism with a bit of early Socialist Realism; for example, Praha svým vítězným synům (Prague's Victorious Sons) at the Emmaus Monastery. The monument was destroyed during the German Occupation and restored in 1998. After 1920, he worked as a Professor at the Academy of Arts, Architecture and Design.

Between 1921 and 1926, he created thirteen monuments of various sizes, honoring Czech President, Tomáš Garrigue Masaryk, one of which is in San Francisco. His work was also part of the sculpture event in the art competition at the 1932 Summer Olympics.

Mařatka died in Prague on 20 April 1937.

== Writings/Further reading ==
- Josef Mařatka: Vzpomínky a záznamy (Memories and Records), introduction by Petr Wittlich, Prague, Karolinum, 2003, ISBN 80-246-0518-X
- Josef Mařatka : 1874-1937, exhibition catalog, Gottwald Regional Art Gallery, 1989
- Josef Mařatka, introduction by Jaromír Pečírka, Prague, Mánes Union of Fine Arts, Melantrich, 1942
