= Sidney Gordin =

Russian-born American artist (1918–1996)

Sidney Alexander Gordin
- Born: October 24, 1918; Chelyabinsk, Russian Republic
- Died: January 28, 1996 (aged 77); Berkeley, California, U.S.
- Education: Brooklyn Museum Art School; Cooper Union
- Occupations: Artist, professor
- Movement: Abstract expressionism, constructivism

Sidney Alexander Gordin (1918–1996) was a Russian-born American artist and educator, known for his abstract paintings, prints, and sculptures. He was a Professor Emeritus at University of California, Berkeley, where he taught from 1958 to 1986. Gordin was associated with abstract expressionism and constructivism.

== Early life and education ==
Gordin was born on October 24, 1918, in Chelyabinsk, Russian Republic. When he was born the Russian Empire had recently collapsed due to the Russian Revolution. His family migrated to Shanghai, and later Harbin in Heilongjiang province, China. In 1922, at the age of 4, his family moved to Brooklyn, New York City, New York.

Gordin graduated from Brooklyn Technical High School. He attended Brooklyn Museum Art School in 1935 to 1936; followed by study at Cooper Union in 1937 to 1941, where he graduated.

== Art career ==
Gordin's first group exhibition was in 1951 at the Metropolitan Museum of Art, named "American Sculpture 1951". That same year in 1951, Gordin's first solo show was held at Bennington College in Vermont. In 1954, the Museum of Modern Art (MoMA) hosted the "Play Sculpture Competition", Gordin had participated and won third place with "Tunnel Maze" (1954). His "Tunnel Maze" was judged as most successful for play, safety, and ease; and subsequently was manufactured by Creative Playthings.

In 1958, he moved to California. In 1960, Gordin acquired an art studio in Provincetown, Massachusetts, while still maintaining his home in California. In the 1960s, "The Breakfast Group" was founded by Elmer Bischoff and Gordin. The group was made up of Berkeley-based artists who met weekly to talk art over breakfast, the group held several group exhibitions.

In 1959, he had his first solo exhibition in the San Francisco Bay Area at the Dilexi Gallery of San Francisco founded by Jim Newman. In 1992, he was awarded the Maggie Kuhn Award by Presbyterian Senior Services, for being a role model in aging.

== Teaching ==
He briefly taught in schools in New York state including at Brooklyn College, Pratt Institute, Sarah Lawrence College, and the New School for Social Research. Gordin moved to California in 1958 to start a teaching position at University of California, Berkeley, where he remained until 1986. He was a full professor from 1967 to 1986, and served as the department chair.

== Death and legacy ==
He died on January 28, 1996, at home in Berkeley. His memorial service was held at Kroeber Hall on the U.C. Berkeley campus.

His work can be found in public museum collections include at the Whiney Museum of American Art, Museum of Modern Art, the Art Institute of Chicago, Fine Arts Museums of San Francisco, Lowe Art Museum, San Francisco Museum of Modern Art, Chrysler Museum of Art, Madison Museum of Contemporary Art, Brooklyn Museum, Farnsworth Art Museum, and Oakland Museum of California.

== See also ==
- Untitled (Gordin)
- Herbert and Dorothy Vogel
