= Roald Amundsen Memorial =

Memorial by Sigvald Asbjørnsen in San Francisco, California, U.S.

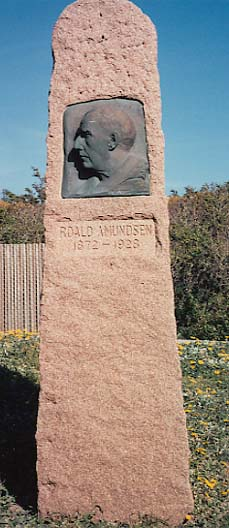
- The memorial in 2007
- Location: Golden Gate Park
- Coordinates: 37.76994°N 122.51045°W
- Designer: Sigvald Asbjørnsen
- Type: Memorial
- Dedicated to: Roald Amundsen

The Roald Amundsen Memorial by Sigvald Asbjørnsen is installed in San Francisco's Golden Gate Park, in the U.S. state of California. It honours Norwegian polar explorer Roald Amundsen, the first person to the South Pole.
