= Skygate =

1985 sculpture by Roger Barr in San Francisco, California, U.S.

- The sculpture in 2018
- Artist: Roger Barr
- Year: 1985
- Type: Sculpture
- Medium: Stainless steel
- Location: San Francisco, California, United States; 37°48′29″N 122°24′29″W

Skygate is an outdoor 1985 stainless steel sculpture by Roger Barr, installed along the Embarcadero in San Francisco, California, in the United States. The sculpture was the first piece of public art along the Embarcadero.

As inscribed on the plaque placed on the ground nearby, this artwork is dedicated to American philosopher Eric Hoffer.
