= Saint Mary's Square (San Francisco) =

Park in San Francisco, California, US

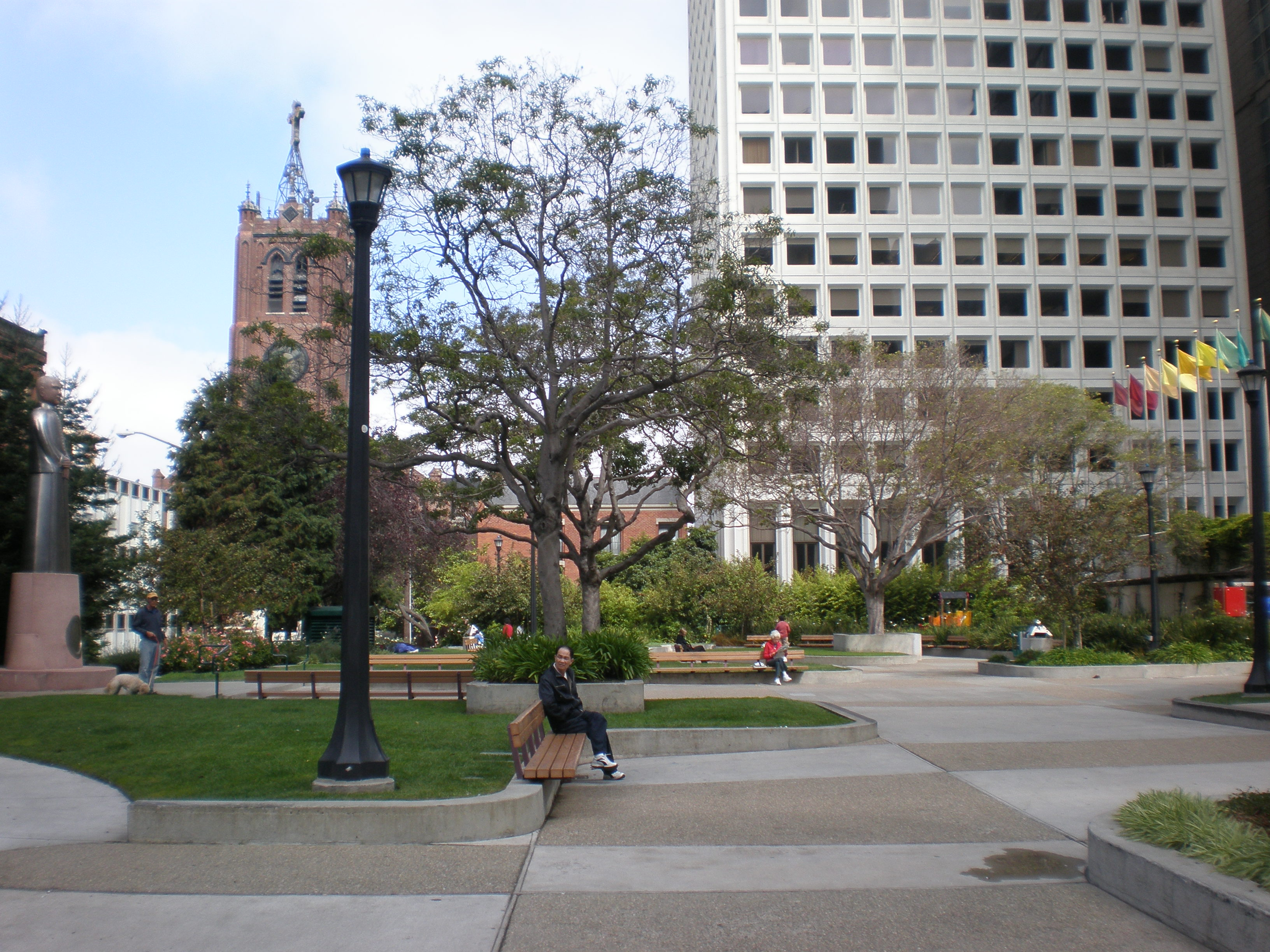
- The square in 2008
- Interactive map of Saint Mary's Square
- Coordinates: 37°47′31″N 122°24′19″W

Saint Mary's Square is a park and urban square across California Street from Old St. Mary's Cathedral in San Francisco's Chinatown, in the U.S. state of California.

== History ==
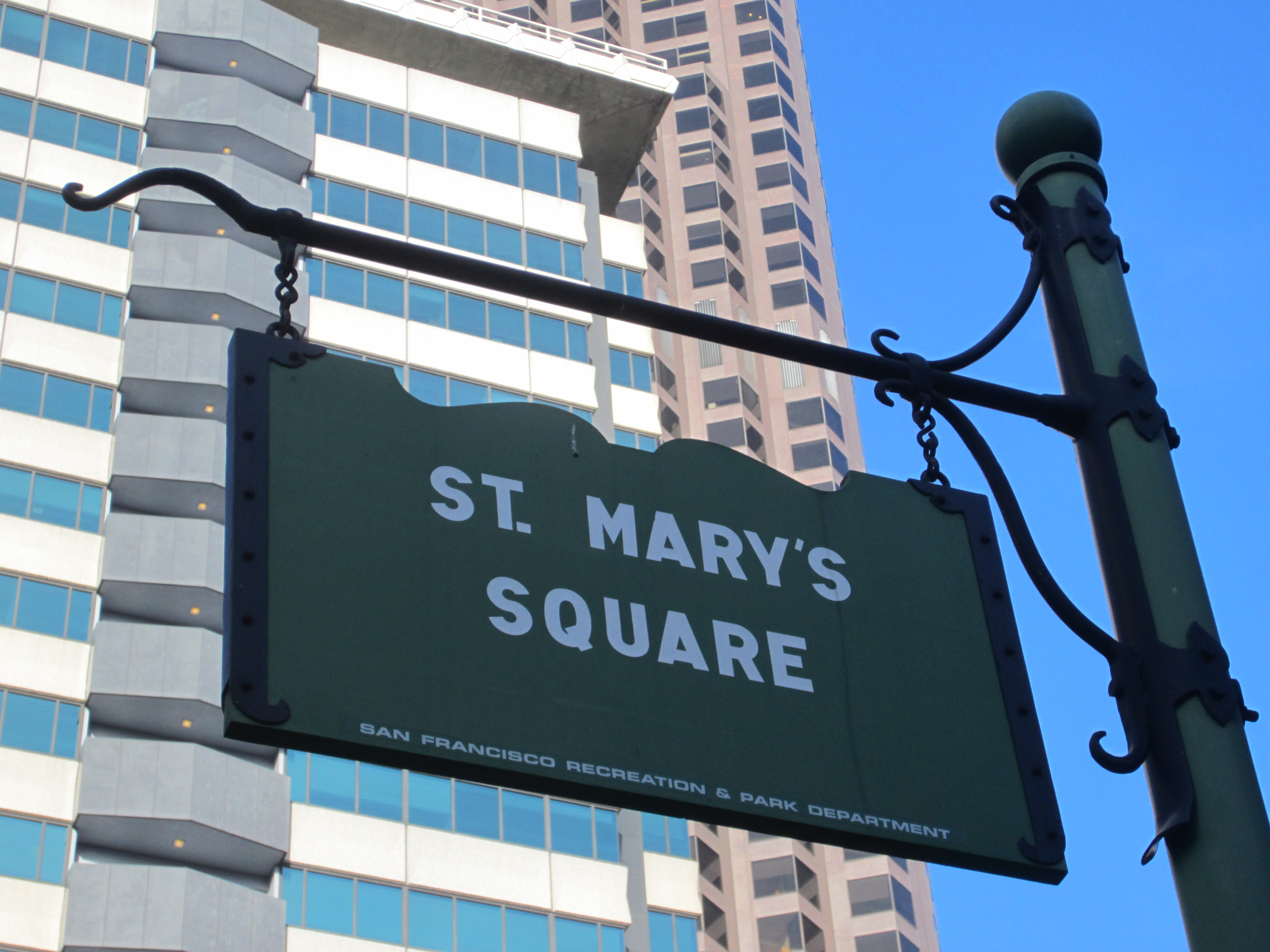
Park signage, 2013

Designed in 1957 by Robert Royston the square is a rooftop park located on the top level of a parking garage in San Francisco's Chinatown neighborhood. At the time, rooftop gardens were promoted in the city by real estate developers as a means to maximize buildable areas, and were most often sited on two‐story, above‐ground parking structures. being one of the first below ground parking structures, the rooftop garden was put into the designs as an afterthought. the current existing park was redesigned from the historic park that occupied the space prior to the implementation of the underground parking.

=== Design ===
Royston's design used a system of grids and multiple tones of concrete to draw attention from the geometry of the space, imposed on it by the virtue of being above a parking garage. by implementing low seat walls and the curved nature of the planting beds, he divided up the pedestrian spaces, generating a feeling of nature within the space. The park has access to the street via a wide concrete staircase on one end and an at-grade entrance at the other. An existing row of poplar trees was retained as backdrop for the park, and a sculpture of Sun Yat-Sen by local artist Benny Bufano provides a focal point for the space. The park also includes a playground and refreshment stand.

== Prominent features ==
=== The “Women’s Column of Strength” ===
A privately funded statue that was placed in 2017 after being approved by the Board of Supervisors. The sculpture is controversial, as it honors the comfort women who were women and girls forced into sexual slavery by the Imperial Japanese Army in occupied territories before and during World War II. The mayor of Osaka, Japan stated he would sever the sister-city relationship with San Francisco as "the relationship of trust has completely been destroyed".

=== Statue of Sun Yat-sen ===
A 14-foot statue of statue of Sun Yat-sen by Beniamino Bufano, made of red granite and stainless steel, was erected in St. Mary's Square in 1937. It is inscribed: "Dr. Sun Yat Sen 1866-1925 Father of the Chinese Republic and First President Founder of the Kuo Min Tang Champion of Democracy Lover of mankind: Proponent of friendship and peace among the nations, based on equality, justice and goodwill". Sun Yat-sen had often frequented the park during his visits to San Francisco in the early 1900s.

=== Memorial plaque ===
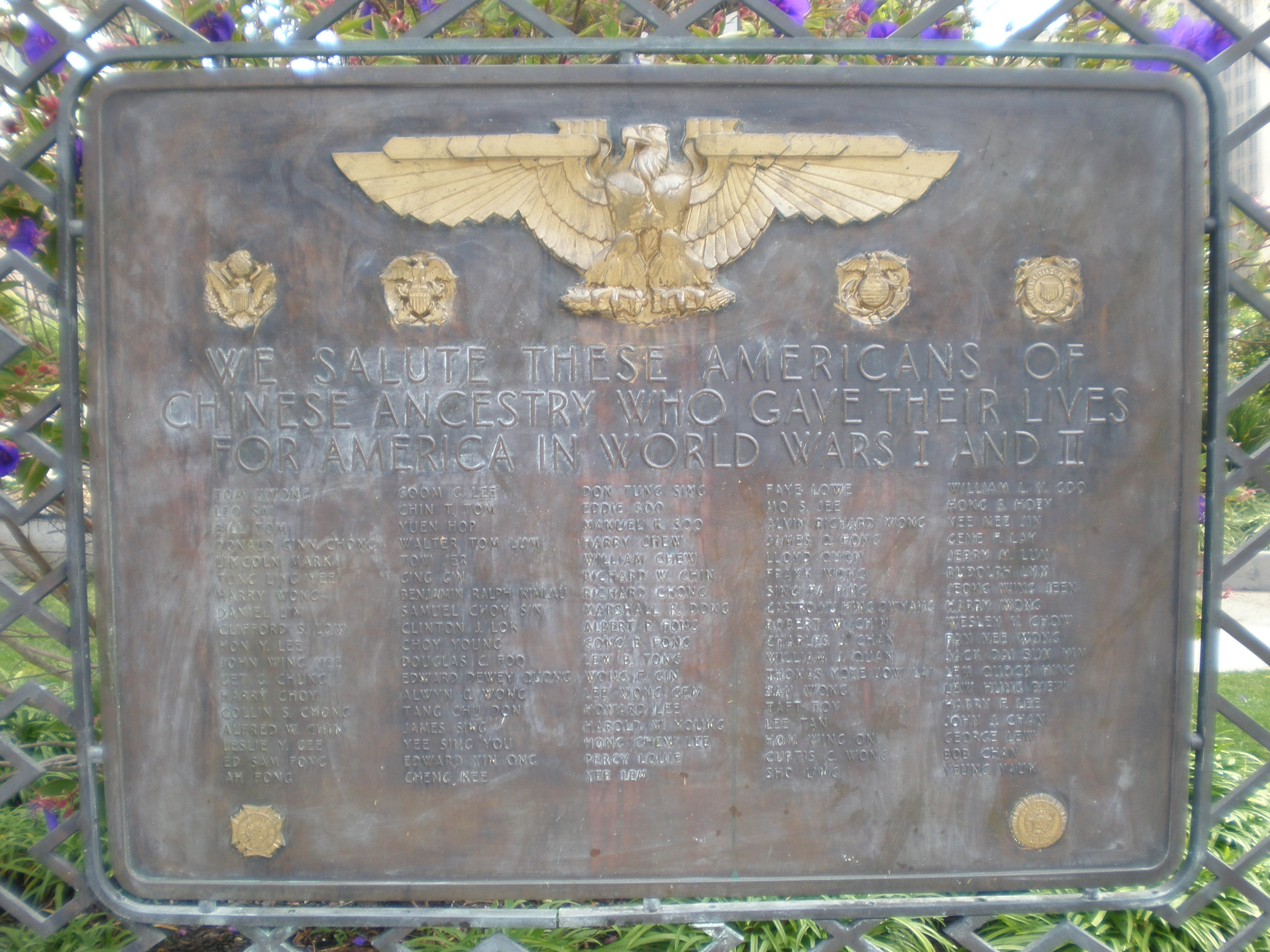
Memorial plaque

A memorial plaque in dedication to the Americans of Chinese ancestry who gave their lives for America in World Wars I and II. Reads, "We Salute these Americans of Chinese Ancestry who gave their lives for America in World Wars I and II".

=== Other points of note ===
A ginkgo biloba tree, planted in March 2017, honors Chinatown activist Rose Pak.

St. Mary's Square includes the former location of the Kong Chow Temple.
