= Steven Whyte =

American sculptor

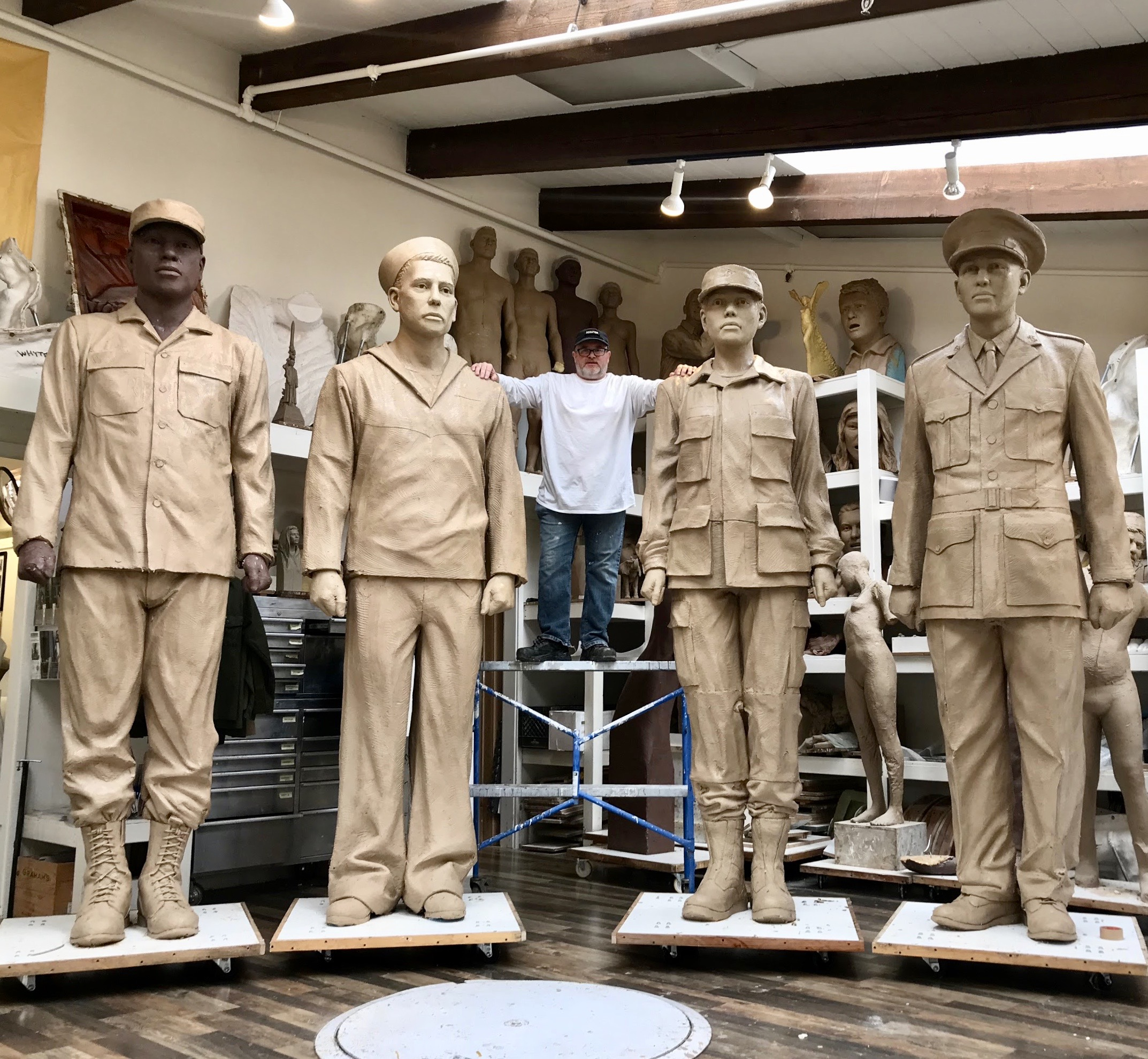
Whyte with his sculptures of Dublin Soldiers (2019)

Steven Whyte (born 17 March 1969) is a sculptor classically trained in the traditional methodology of figurative bronze and portrait sculpture living in Carmel, California. He has produced many public memorials and installations in both England and throughout the United States with subjects ranging from miners, to soldiers and fire fighters. He is credited with over fifty life size and larger bronze public figures and major monuments including The Silverdale Mining Memorial, The Lance Sergeant Jack Baskeyfield VC Tribute, The Spirit of 1948, and The Dr. John Roberts Monument. Whyte's multimillion-dollar, sixteen-figure monument in San Diego, California entitled National Salute to Bob Hope and the Military is one of his most notable works.

In 2010, Whyte unveiled a twice life size portrait monument of the 1957 Heisman Trophy Winner, John David Crow at Texas A&M University in College Station, Texas, and a life-size full-relief statue of St. Anthony and Child at Basilica of Mission San Carlos Borromeo de Carmelo (Carmel Mission) Carmel-by-the-Sea, California.

Whyte's work also includes four life-size figures for a memorial to the fallen officers of the San Diego Sheriff's Department which was unveiled in May 2011. He also completed a nine figure composition for Cannery Row, Monterey, CA, and a life size Jumbo the Elephant for Tufts University, MA. One of Whyte's most complex works, the massive statue for Texas A&M University titled The Aggie War Hymn Monument, has twelve 1.6 times life size bronze figures of students, "sawing off varsity's horns". The 10 ft by 39 ft sculpture was unveiled in September 2014, at a cost of $1.7M. In 2016 Whyte was awarded Sports Artist of the Year, sculptor, by The United States Sports Academy and The American Sport Art Museum & Archives. In December 2016 The Smithsonian Institution acquired Whyte's bronze bust of Congressman John Conyers Jr. for the National Portrait Gallery (United States) in Washington D.C..

Whyte was the sculptor for the Column of Strength, San Francisco's controversial Comfort Women Memorial.

== Biography ==
Steven Whyte is a British-American figurative sculptor known for his classically inspired public monuments and portraiture. With a career spanning over 30 years, he has created more than 80 life-size or larger public bronze figures installed globally. Based in Carmel, California, Whyte is a Fellow of the National Sculpture Society and a former vice president of the Royal Society of Portrait Sculptors. His work is featured in the collections of the Smithsonian Institution and the Carter Presidential Library.

== Early life and education ==
Whyte was born in England. He was the only undergraduate ever accepted into the prestigious Sir Henry Dalton School of Sculpture, where he studied under Dame Elizabeth Fink RA and Professor Colin Melbourne ARCA. Before graduating, he began receiving high-profile portrait commissions, including Keith Sutton (Bishop of Lichfield), Viscount Blakenham, the Earl of Stockton, Sir John Harvey-Jones, and the Speaker of the House of Commons.

Disturbed by the decline of figurative sculpture in formal education, Whyte co-created the first nationally validated course devoted to figurative sculpture with sculptor Michael Talbot ARA. He taught at Stafford College, where the course became a model for classical training in the UK.

== Professional recognition ==
Whyte became the youngest member of the London-based Society of Portrait Sculptors and was later elected vice president, serving alongside Franta Belsky PPRBS. His early public works in the UK include:

- Silverdale Mining Memorial
- Lance Sergeant Jack Baskeyfield VC Tribute
- The Spirit of 1948

== Move to the United States ==
In 2004, Whyte relocated to Carmel, California, where he opened the Steven Whyte Sculpture Studios and Gallery. The studio quickly gained attention and became a cultural landmark. Media features included CNN's My City My Secret, The San Francisco Chronicle, and The New York Times in its 36 Hours travel column. After thirteen years in the U.S., Whyte became a naturalized American citizen.

== Monumental works ==
Whyte is known for large-scale public monuments that blend classical technique with contemporary themes. Major commissions include:

- The National Salute to Bob Hope and the Military (San Diego, CA) – Featuring Bob Hope surrounded by historically accurate service members from each major conflict in which he performed.
- Dr. Martin Luther King Jr. Monuments
  - Column of Knowledge (Fontana, CA) – A bust of King atop a column representing books that influenced him.
  - Monument (Hollywood, FL) – A 1.5x life-size bust atop a granite slab engraved with the "I Have a Dream" speech.
- High Relief at Mission San Carlos Borromeo (Carmel, CA) – Depicting St. Anthony and the Christ Child.
- U.S. Presidents Series – Busts of Abraham Lincoln, Thomas Jefferson, and others. A Lincoln bust was displayed by former secretary of defense Leon Panetta at the Pentagon.
- Texas A&M University
  - John David Crow Monument – A 13-foot statue of the Heisman Trophy winner.
  - War Hymn Monument – A 1.6x life-size group of twelve students in mid-cheer.
- San Diego Law Enforcement Memorial – A sheriff presenting a folded flag to a fallen comrade’s family.
- Tufts University – A life-size bronze elephant, Jumbo, the school’s mascot.
- Cannery Row Monument (Monterey, CA) – Features John Steinbeck and characters from his novel Cannery Row; the largest public monument between San Francisco and Los Angeles.
- Comfort Women Memorials – Located in San Francisco and Seoul, these commemorate the estimated 200,000 women forced into sexual slavery by the Japanese military in WWII. The San Francisco monument was named one of Smithsonian Magazine’s top monuments of 2017.
- Joseph Vaughn Monument (Furman University, SC) – Celebrating the university’s first Black student.
- Florida Slavery Memorial – Currently in progress.
- Fred Gray Tribute (Alabama) – Honoring the civil rights attorney who represented Rosa Parks and Martin Luther King Jr.
- Crossroads Veterans Monument (Dublin, CA) – A $500,000 installation honoring U.S. veterans.
- Local tributes – Including portraits of Mike Marotta (Monterey, CA) and Dennis Capra (Swiss Rifle Club).

== Style and philosophy ==
Whyte’s work emphasizes expressive presence, detailed realism, and classical craftsmanship. He is known for blending technical rigor with emotional depth. His sculptures range from intimate portrait busts to large public monuments and frequently explore themes of identity, resilience, and representation.

== Awards and recognition ==
- 2016 – Sports Artist of the Year, United States Sports Academy
- Smithsonian National Portrait Gallery – Bronze bust of Congressman John Conyers, Jr. added to the permanent collection
- The Carter Center – Heroic bust of President Jimmy Carter (3.3x life-size)
- 2021 – Stanley Bleifeld Memorial Award, National Sculpture Society
- 2022 – Champion of the Arts, Monterey County
- 2022 – Recognized by the U.S. Congress and California Senate for contributions to the arts
- 2024 – Elected Fellow of the National Sculpture Society

== Artistic style ==
The human form is Whyte's preferred subject, and he typically works with live models whenever possible. His sculptures are ultimately cast in bronze, but they begin as clay.

Steven Whyte describes himself as a "sculptor of people" and although his pieces are reminiscent of classical figures, Whyte chooses to put importance on "the emotional quality and impact of the sculpture" more than the adherence to traditional technique. Whyte intends for his work to have "narrative and tangible personality".

Whyte currently works in a studio that is open to the public.

== Public collections ==
=== Public collections (selected) ===
Smithsonian National Portrait Gallery, Washington, D.C. Smithsonian National Museum of African American History and Culture, Washington, D.C. National Portrait Gallery, London The House of Commons, London National Museum of China, Nanjing, China National Marine Corps Museum, Virginia Carter Presidential Library, Atlanta, Georgia The Potteries Museum, Hanley, England

=== Municipal collections ===
San Diego Port Authority, California San Diego County, California City of Stoke-on-Trent, United Kingdom City of Fontana, California City of Seaside, California City of Monterey, California City of Hollywood, Florida City of Seoul, South Korea City of Dublin, California The State of Florida City of Mobile, Alabama

=== Educational institutions ===
Texas A&M University Tufts University Houston Baptist University Furman University Houston Christian University California Polytechnic State University, San Luis Obispo (Cal Poly SLO)

== Public commissions ==
- Marion Hollins. Life-size figure of the American amateur golfer, athlete, and the only known female golf course developer in history. Winner of the 1921 U.S. Women's Amateur Golf Championship, alongside a life-size figure of legendary golf course designer Alister MacKenzie. Pasatiempo Golf Club, CA. April 2025. (Project budget: $200,000)
- The State of Florida’s Slavery Memorial Monument. Multiple life-size bronze figures representing the history of African slavery in the USA. Florida State Capitol Building, Tallahassee, FL. February 2025. (Project budget: $450,000)
- Fred Gray. Life-size figure of the justice, equality, and civil rights lawyer for Martin Luther King Jr. and Rosa Parks. Alabama State Bar Association, Montgomery, AL. 2025. (Project budget: $100,000)
- Isom Clemon Civil Rights Memorial Park. 1.5x life-size bronze figure and five plaques representing the history of Longshoremen in Alabama. City of Mobile and the State of Alabama. 2025. (Project budget: $300,000)
- Fire and Rescue Sculpture #80. 1.5x life-size bronze half figure representing a female firefighter. Station #80, Gainesville, FL. 2025. (Project budget: $75,000)
- John Madden. Life-size figure of the legendary football player, coach, and commentator. California Polytechnic University, San Luis Obispo, CA; also Carmel, CA; also Pleasanton, CA. 2023–24. (Project budget: $200,000)
- President Jimmy Carter. Three times life-size bust for Carter Center, Presidential Library. Atlanta, GA. 2022. (Project budget: $110,000)
- Don Biddle Memorial. Life-size bust of Councilman Don Biddle. Don Biddle Community Park, Dublin, CA. 2022. (Project budget: $50,000)
- Dublin Crossroads Veterans Memorial. Four 1.6x life-size military figures and plaza. Crossing Park, Dublin, CA. 2022. (Project budget: $640,000)
- Dennis Caprara Memorial. Life-size standing figure of the president of the Swiss Rifle Club of Monterey County, CA. 2022. (Project budget: $75,000)
- Michael Marotta Memorial. Life-size seated figure of “Mr. Monterey.” Monterey, CA. 2021. (Project budget: $85,000)
- James Dean. Life-size posthumous portrait bust of the movie icon. Zak Bagans’ The Haunted Museum, Las Vegas, NV. 2021. (Project budget: $12,500)
- Joseph Vaughn. Life-size standing bronze sculpture of the first African-American student at Furman University. Greenville, SC. 2020. (Project budget: $80,000)
- Comfort Women’s Circle of Strength. Four life-size figures of WWII Comfort Women, redesigned from the San Francisco monument to emphasize recognition, participation, and agency. Seoul, South Korea. 2019. (Project budget: $250,000)
- Five Saints. Five half life-size figures sculpted for niches in the Cloisters on the Platte chapel. Omaha, NE. 2019. (Project budget: $125,000)
- Stewart Morris, Sr.. Life-size figure of one of Houston Christian University’s founding fathers. Houston, TX. 2017. (Project budget: $75,000)
- Saint Mary and Saint Joseph. Life-size figures of Mary and Joseph. Cloisters on the Platte, Omaha, NE. 2018. (Project budget: $150,000)
- Mary and Joseph. 7 ft figure of Mary and 8 ft figure of Joseph. Cloisters on the Platte, Omaha, NE. 2018. (Project budget: $212,000)
- Comfort Women’s Column of Strength. Four life-size figures of WWII Comfort Women and cylindrical cor-ten steel base. San Francisco, CA. 2017. (Project budget: $250,000)
- Jumbo the Elephant. Life-size (11 ft) African elephant monument for Tufts University’s mascot. Medford, MA. 2014. (Project budget: $300,000)
- Aggie War Hymn Monument. Twelve 1.6x life-size figures on a 40' x 7' base representing Aggie students during a traditional cheer. Texas A&M University, College Station, TX. 2014. (Project budget: $1.9 million)
- A National Monument to John Steinbeck and Cannery Row. Nine slightly over life-size figures on a 17' x 20' x 16' stone formation. Features Steinbeck and eight characters from Cannery Row. Monterey, CA. 2014. (Project budget: $1 million)
- Tribute to Fallen Deputies. Four life-size figures in tribute to fallen officers and their families. San Diego Sheriffs Deputies Association, San Diego, CA. 2011. (Project budget: $350,000)
- John David Crow. Twice life-size action portrait figure of the 1957 Heisman Trophy Winner. Texas A&M University, College Station, TX. 2010. (Project budget: $250,000)
- Dream Speech Bust. Twice life-size portrait bust of Dr. Martin Luther King Jr., with his “I Have a Dream” speech in full. City of Hollywood, FL. 2008. (Project budget: $25,000)
- St. Anthony and Child. Life-size full relief. Carmel Mission Basilica, Carmel, CA. 2008. (Project budget: $55,000)
- Column of Knowledge. 1.5x life-size portrait bust of Dr. King on a stack of books. City of Fontana, CA. 2008. (Project budget: $55,000)
- A National Tribute to Bob Hope and the Military. Eight life-size figures representing U.S. service members from different eras in a 15-figure design. Co-created with Eugene Daub. San Diego Port Authority, CA. 2008. (Project budget: $2 million)
- Dr. John L. D. Roberts Monument. Life-size statue of the founder of Seaside, California. 2004. (Project budget: $40,000)
- The Lance Sergeant Jack Baskeyfield VC Tribute. Twice life-size (12 ft) figure of the Victoria Cross recipient. Hanley, England. 1996. (Project budget: $250,000)
- Spirit of 1948. Tribute for the Staffordshire Fire Service featuring three life-size figures in cast stone. Staffordshire, England. 1998. (Project budget: $90,000)
- Holden Lane High School Relief. Collaborative 21' x 7' brick relief project with a local school. Burslem, England. 1998. (Project budget: $40,000)
- The Mier Portal. 36' x 14' brick relief for an interstate tunnel. Mier, England. 1997. (Project budget: $40,000)
- The Silverdale Mining Memorial. 1.5x life-size miner pushing a mining tub with eleven bronze plaques, including four life-size portrait reliefs. Newcastle-under-Lyme, England. 1996. (Project budget: $250,000)
- Tribute to Reginald Mitchell. 1.25x life-size full memorial portrait figure of the Spitfire aircraft designer. The Potteries Museum, Hanley, England. 1991. (Project budget: $70,000)
- Destiny. 9 ft rising female goddess figure. Queen’s Moat Hotel Group, Staffordshire, England. 1991. (Project budget: $30,000)

== Religious work ==
• Five Saints. Five half life-size figures sculpted for niches in the Cloisters on the Platte chapel. Omaha, NE. 2019.

• Stewart Morris, Sr. A life-size figure of one of Houston Baptist University's founding fathers. Houston Baptist University, Houston, TX. 2017.

• Saint Mary and Saint Joseph. Life-size figures of Mary and Joseph. Cloisters on the Platte, Omaha, NE. 2018.

• Mary and Joseph. 7 ft figure of Mary and 8 ft figure of Joseph. Cloisters on the Platte, Omaha, NE. 2018.

== Titled portrait works from life ==
UK Busts and Figures 1989-2000

Shami Ahmad - Chairman, Pinwise PLC

Lord Alexander - Chairman, National Westminster Bank PLC

Heather Angel RSP - Photographer, author

Viscount Blakenham - Chairman, Pearson PLC

James Bowman - Counter Tenor, English National Opera

Arthur Chollerton CBE - Chairman, Staffordshire County Council

Mrs. Hilda Clarke - Director, St. Modwen PLC

Sir Stanley W. Clarke - Chairman, St. Modwen PLC

The Rt. Hon. Kenneth Clarke M.P. - Chancellor of the Exchequer

Peter Cropper - Leader, The Lindsey String Quartet

Peter Cheeseman - Director, The New Victoria Theatre, Newcastle-under-Lyme

Counsellor Alan Edwards - Lord Mayor of Stoke-on-Trent

Professor Brian Fender CMG - Vice-chancellor, Keele University

Mark Fisher MP - Junior Minister of the Arts

Lord Forte - President, Forte PLC

Richard Giordano KBE - Chairman, British Gas PLC

Sir John Harvey-Jones - Industrialist, author, Retired chairman ICI PLC

Edgar Haber - President, Quail Lodge Resort, Carmel, CA

Dr. James Heron MB FRCP - Chairman, The Institute of Neurologists

Freddie Jones - Actor RSC

Dr. Stephen Lock - Editor, The British Medical Journal

Patrick Moore OBE - Astronomer, author

Jackie Mudie - Scottish International Soccer Player

Lord Palumbo - Chairman, The Arts Council of Great Britain

Rupert Pennent-Rea - Deputy chairman, The Bank of England

Trevor Pinnock ARMC - Director, The English Concert Orchestra

Sir Evelyn de Rothschild - Chairman, Rothschild Bank

John Rudge - Manager, Port Vale Football Club

Sir Colin Southgate - Chairman, Thorne EMI PLC

The Earl of Stockton - President, Macmillan Publishers Ltd

Neal Smith - CEO, The Golf Group Inc.

Lord Sterling - Chairman, P&O PLC

The Rt. Rev. Keith Sutton - Lord Bishop of Lichfield

Lord Tombs - Retired chairman, Rolls-Royce Aero PLC

May Walley MBE - Director, The Bedford Singers

Lord Weathrill MP - Speaker, The House of Commons

The Duke of Westminster - President, Grosvenor International Holdings

Lord Young - Chairman, Cable and Wireless PLC

USA Busts and Figures 1989-2000

Ted Balestreri - Chairman & CEO, Cannery Row Company

Mike Beasley - Venture Partner of Nobska Ventures. Chairman, Rocket Software

Congressman John J Conyers - US representative, Dean of the House of Representatives

Herman "Herm" Edwards Jr. - American football analyst for ESPN and former NFL player and coach

Gustavo M. de la Garza Ortega - Founder and chairman, Marcatel Com

Edgar H. Haber - Founder of Quail Lodge Resort and Golf Club

Secretary Leon Panetta - Director, CIA. US secretary of defense

Sylvia Panetta - Director, Panetta Institute

Sam Linder - President, Sam Linder Auto Group

Burt Mendlesohn - Consultant

George Tanimura - Co-founder, Tanimura & Antle

== Achievements ==
- 1987: Recipient fellowship to attend the Sir Henry Doulton School of Sculpture
- 1994–2002: Member, The Society of Portrait Sculptors
- 1994–1996: Vice-president, The Society of Portrait Sculptors
- 1997–present: Associate, National Association for the Prosecution of Felons (Burslem)
- 2002–2004: Invited in 2002-2004 to guest lecture at The National Portrait Gallery, London
- 2005-2007: Voted "Best Artist" in Monterey County by the readers of Monterey County Weekly
- 2008-2009: Voted "Best Sculpture Gallery" in Monterey County by the readers of Carmel Pine Cone
- 2009: Voted "Best Sculpture Gallery" in Monterey County by the readers of Monterey County Weekly
- 2009-2016: Voted "Best Artist" in Monterey County by the readers of Carmel Pine Cone
- 2016 Awarded Sports Artist of the Year, sculptor, by The United States Academy of Sports and The American Sport Art Museum & Archives.
- 2016 Smithsonian Institution acquire Whyte's bronze bust of Congressman John J. Conyers Jr. for the National Portrait Gallery in Washington D.C..
- 2019 Work acquired by the Jimmy Carter Presidential Library, GA
- 2021 Winner of National Sculpture Society's, Stanley Bleifeld Memorial Award

== See also ==
- List of sculptors
