= Speaker of the National Assembly (South Korea) =

Presiding officer of the National Assembly of South Korea

Speaker of the National Assembly of the Republic of Korea
- 대한민국 국회의장 (Korean)
- Emblem of the National Assembly

- Flag of the National Assembly

- Incumbent; Cho Jeong-sik since 5 June 2026
- National Assembly
- Style: Mr Speaker (informal); The Right Honourable (formal); His Excellency; (Respected Title)
- Status: Presiding officer
- Residence: Gukhoeuijang Gonggwan
- Seat: National Assembly, Seoul, South Korea
- Nominator: Party
- Appointer: National Assembly
- Term length: Two years
- Constituting instrument: Constitution of South Korea
- Formation: 31 May 1948; 78 years ago
- First holder: Syngman Rhee
- Deputy: Deputy Speaker of the National Assembly of South Korea
- Salary: US$115,000
- Website: korea.assembly.go.kr

The speaker of the National Assembly (Korean: 국회의장; Hanja: 國會議長; RR: Gukhoe Uijang) is the presiding officer of the National Assembly of South Korea.

The current Speaker, Cho Jeong-sik was elected by the National Assembly and took office on 5 June 2026.

== List of speakers ==
=== 1948–1960 ===
No.	Portrait	Name Constituency (Birth–Death)	Term of office		Party	National Assembly
No.	Portrait	Name Constituency (Birth–Death)	Took office	Left office	Party	National Assembly
1		Syngman Rhee 이승만 李承晩; Member for Dongdaemun A, Seoul (1875–1965)	31 May 1948	24 July 1948	NARRKI	Constituent National Assembly
2		Sin Ik-hui 신익희 申翼熙; Member for Gwangju, Gyeonggi (1892–1956)	4 August 1948	30 May 1954	NARRKI	Constituent National Assembly
2		Sin Ik-hui 신익희 申翼熙; Member for Gwangju, Gyeonggi (1892–1956)	4 August 1948	30 May 1954	DNP	2nd
3		Lee Ki-poong 이기붕 李起鵬; Member for Seodaemun, Seoul (until 1958) and Icheon, Gyeonggi (from 1958) (1896–1960)	9 June 1954	28 April 1960	Liberal	3rd
3		Lee Ki-poong 이기붕 李起鵬; Member for Seodaemun, Seoul (until 1958) and Icheon, Gyeonggi (from 1958) (1896–1960)	9 June 1954	28 April 1960	Liberal	4th
4		Kwak Sang-hoon 곽상훈 郭尙勳; Member for Incheon B, Gyeonggi (1896–1980)	2 May 1960	23 June 1960	Democratic (1955)	4th

=== 1960–1961 ===
==== President of the House of Councillors ====
No.	Portrait	Name Constituency (Birth–Death)	Term of office		Party	National Assembly
No.	Portrait	Name Constituency (Birth–Death)	Took office	Left office	Party	National Assembly
—		Baek Nak-jun 백낙준 白樂濬; Member for Seoul (1895–1985)	8 August 1960	16 May 1961	Independent	5th

==== Speaker of the House of Representatives ====
No.	Portrait	Name Constituency (Birth–Death)	Term of office		Party	National Assembly
No.	Portrait	Name Constituency (Birth–Death)	Took office	Left office	Party	National Assembly
(4)		Kwak Sang-hoon 곽상훈 郭尙勳; Member for Incheon B, Gyeonggi (1896–1980)	8 August 1960	16 May 1961	Democratic (1955)	5th

=== 1963–1972 ===
No.	Portrait	Name Constituency (Birth–Death)	Term of office		Party	National Assembly
No.	Portrait	Name Constituency (Birth–Death)	Took office	Left office	Party	National Assembly
5		Rhee Hyo-sang 이효상 李孝祥; Member for Nam, Daegu, North Gyeongsang (1906–1989)	17 December 1963	30 June 1971	Democratic Republican	6th
5		Rhee Hyo-sang 이효상 李孝祥; Member for Nam, Daegu, North Gyeongsang (1906–1989)	17 December 1963	30 June 1971	Democratic Republican	7th
6		Paik Too-chin 백두진 白斗鎭; Member for National PR (1908–1993)	26 July 1971	17 October 1972	Democratic Republican	8th

=== 1973–1980 ===
No.	Portrait	Name Constituency (Birth–Death)	Term of office		Party	National Assembly
No.	Portrait	Name Constituency (Birth–Death)	Took office	Left office	Party	National Assembly
7		Chung Il-kwon 정일권 丁一權; Member for Sokcho–Inje– Goseong–Yangyang, Gangwon (1917–1994)	12 March 1973	11 March 1979	Democratic Republican	9th
8		Paik Too-chin 백두진 白斗鎭; Member appointed by the President (1908–1993)	17 March 1979	17 December 1979	Democratic Republican	10th
—		Min Kwan-shik 민관식 閔寬植; Member for Jongno–Jung, Seoul (1918–2006); Acting	18 December 1979	27 October 1980	Democratic Republican	10th

=== Since 1981 ===
No.	Portrait	Name Constituency (Birth–Death)	Term of office		Party	National Assembly
No.	Portrait	Name Constituency (Birth–Death)	Took office	Left office	Party	National Assembly
9		Chung Rae-hyuk 정래혁 丁來赫; Member for Damyang–Gokseong–Hwasun, South Jeolla (1926–2022)	11 April 1981	10 April 1983	Democratic Justice	11th
10		Chae Mun-shik 채문식 蔡汶植; Member for Mungyeong–Yecheon, North Gyeongsang (1925–2010)	11 April 1983	10 April 1985	Democratic Justice	11th
11		Lee Jae-hyung 이재형 李載灐; Member for National PR (1914–1992)	13 May 1985	29 May 1988	Democratic Justice	12th
12		Kim Jae-soon 김재순 金在淳; Member for Hwacheon–Cheorwon, Gangwon (1923–2016)	30 May 1988	29 May 1990	Democratic Justice	13th
13		Park Jyun-kyu 박준규 朴浚圭; Member for Dong, Daegu (until 1992) and Dong B, Daegu (from 1992) (1925–2014)	30 May 1990	30 March 1993	Democratic Liberal	13th
13		Park Jyun-kyu 박준규 朴浚圭; Member for Dong, Daegu (until 1992) and Dong B, Daegu (from 1992) (1925–2014)	30 May 1990	30 March 1993	Democratic Liberal	14th
—		Hwang Nak-joo 황낙주 黃珞周; Member for Changwon B, South Gyeongsang (1928–2002); Acting	31 March 1993	26 April 1993	Democratic Liberal	14th
14		Lee Man-sup 이만섭 李萬燮; Member for National PR (1932–2015)	27 April 1993	28 June 1994	Democratic Liberal	14th
15		Hwang Nak-joo 황낙주 黃珞周; Member for Changwon B, South Gyeongsang (1928–2002)	29 June 1994	29 May 1996	Democratic Liberal	14th
16		Kim Soo-han 김수한 金守漢; Member for National PR (1928–2024)	4 July 1996	29 May 1998	New Korea	15th
17		Park Jyun-kyu 박준규 朴浚圭; Member for Jung, Daegu (1925–2014)	3 August 1998	29 May 2000	ULD	15th
18		Lee Man-sup 이만섭 李萬燮; Member for National PR (1932–2015)	5 June 2000	29 May 2002	Millennium Democratic	16th
19		Park Kwan-yong 박관용 朴寬用; Member for Dongnae, Busan (born 1938)	8 July 2002	29 May 2004	Grand National	16th
20		Kim Won-ki 김원기 金元基; Member for Jeongeup, North Jeolla (born 1937)	5 June 2004	29 May 2006	Uri	17th
21		Lim Chae-jung 임채정 林采正; Member for Nowon C, Seoul (born 1941)	19 June 2006	29 May 2008	Uri	17th
22		Kim Hyong-o 김형오 金炯旿; Member for Yeongdo, Busan (born 1947)	10 July 2008	29 May 2010	Grand National	18th
23		Park Hee-tae 박희태 朴熺太; Member for Yangsan, South Gyeongsang (born 1938)	8 June 2010	27 February 2012	Grand National	18th
—		Chung Ui-hwa 정의화 鄭義和; Member for Jung–Dong, Busan (born 1948); Acting	27 February 2012	29 May 2012	Saenuri	18th
24		Kang Chang-hee 강창희 姜昌熙; Member for Jung, Daejeon (born 1946)	1 July 2012	29 May 2014	Saenuri	19th
25		Chung Eui-hwa 정의화 鄭義和; Member for Jung–Dong, Busan (born 1948)	30 May 2014	29 May 2016	Saenuri	19th
26		Chung Sye-kyun 정세균 丁世均; Member for Jongno, Seoul (born 1950)	9 June 2016	29 May 2018	Democratic (2015)	20th
27		Moon Hee-sang 문희상 文喜相; Member for Uijeongbu A, Gyeonggi (born 1945)	13 July 2018	29 May 2020	Democratic (2015)	20th
28		Park Byeong-seug 박병석 朴炳錫; Member for Seo A, Daejeon (born 1952)	5 June 2020	29 May 2022	Democratic (2015)	21st
29		Kim Jin-pyo 김진표 金振杓; Member for Suwon E, Gyeonggi (born 1947)	4 July 2022	29 May 2024	Democratic (2015)	21st
30		Woo Won-shik 우원식 禹元植; Member for Nowon A, Seoul (born 1957)	5 June 2024	29 May 2026	Democratic (2015)	22nd
31		Cho Jeong-sik 조정식 趙正湜; Member for Siheung B, Gyeonggi (born 1963)	5 June 2026	Incumbent	Democratic (2015)	22nd

== List of deputy speakers ==
=== 1948–1960 ===
Portrait	Name Constituency (Birth–Death)	Term of office		Party	Speaker	National Assembly
Portrait	Name Constituency (Birth–Death)	Took office	Left office	Party	Speaker	National Assembly
	Sin Ik-hui 신익희 申翼熙; Member for Gwangju, Gyeonggi (1892–1956)	31 May 1948	3 August 1948	NARRKI	Syngman Rhee (until 1948) Sin Ik-hui (from 1948)	Constituent National Assembly
	Kim Dong-won 김동원 金東元; Member for Yongsan, Seoul (1884–1951)	31 May 1948	30 May 1950	Korea Democratic	Syngman Rhee (until 1948) Sin Ik-hui (from 1948)	Constituent National Assembly
	Kim Yak-su 김약수 金若水; Member for Dongnae, South Gyeongsang (1890–1964)	4 August 1948	2 July 1949	Korea Republican	Syngman Rhee (until 1948) Sin Ik-hui (from 1948)	Constituent National Assembly
	Yun Chi-young 윤치영 尹致暎; Member for Jung, Seoul (1898–1996)	4 July 1949	30 May 1950	Korea Democratic	Syngman Rhee (until 1948) Sin Ik-hui (from 1948)	Constituent National Assembly
	Chang Taek-sang 장택상 張澤相; Member for Chilgok, North Gyeongsang (1893–1969)	19 June 1950	6 May 1952	Independent	Sin Ik-hui	2nd
	Cho Bong-am 조봉암 曺奉岩; Member for Incheon C, Gyeonggi (1899–1959)	19 June 1950	30 May 1954	Korea Nationalist	Sin Ik-hui	2nd
	Kim Dong-seong 김동성 金東成; Member for Kaesong, Gyeonggi (1890–1969)	8 May 1952	18 June 1952	Independent	Sin Ik-hui	2nd
	Yun Chi-young 윤치영 尹致暎; Member for Gongju B, South Chungcheong (1898–1996)	10 July 1952	30 May 1954	Korea Nationalist	Sin Ik-hui	2nd
	Choe Sun-ju 최순주 崔淳周; Member for Yeongdong, North Chungcheong (1902–1956)	9 June 1954	2 December 1954	Liberal	Lee Ki-poong	3rd
	Kwak Sang-hoon 곽상훈 郭尙勳; Member for Incheon B, Gyeonggi (1896–1980)	9 June 1954	8 June 1956	Independent	Lee Ki-poong	3rd
	Jo Gyeong-gyu 조경규 趙瓊奎; Member for Haman, South Gyeongsang (1904–1983)	2 March 1955	30 May 1958	Liberal	Lee Ki-poong	3rd
	Hwang Seong-su 황성수 黃聖秀; Member for Yongsan, Seoul (1917–1997)	9 June 1956	27 November 1956	Liberal	Lee Ki-poong	3rd
	Lee Jae-hak 이재학 李在鶴; Member for Hongcheon, Gyeonggi (1904–1973)	5 December 1956	30 May 1958	Liberal	Lee Ki-poong	3rd
	Lee Jae-hak 이재학 李在鶴; Member for Hongcheon, Gyeonggi (1904–1973)	7 June 1958	26 May 1960	Liberal	Lee Ki-poong (until 1960) Kwak Sang-hoon (from 1960)	4th
	Han Hui-seok 한희석 韓熙錫; Member for Cheonan, South Chungcheong (1909–1983)	7 June 1958	2 September 1959	Liberal	Lee Ki-poong (until 1960) Kwak Sang-hoon (from 1960)	4th
	Lim Cheol-ho 임철호 任哲鎬; Member for Buyeo B, South Chungcheong (1905–1990)	4 October 1959	26 May 1960	Liberal	Lee Ki-poong (until 1960) Kwak Sang-hoon (from 1960)	4th
	Kim Do-yeon 김도연 金度演; Member for Seodaemun A, Seoul (1894–1967)	10 June 1960	28 July 1960	Democratic	Lee Ki-poong (until 1960) Kwak Sang-hoon (from 1960)	4th
	Lee Jae-hyeong 이재형 李載灐; Member for Siheung, Gyeonggi (1914–1992)	10 June 1960	28 July 1960	Liberal	Lee Ki-poong (until 1960) Kwak Sang-hoon (from 1960)	4th

=== 1960–1961 ===
==== Vice President of the House of Councillors ====
Portrait	Name Constituency (Birth–Death)	Term of office		Party	President	National Assembly
Portrait	Name Constituency (Birth–Death)	Took office	Left office	Party	President	National Assembly
	So Seon-gyu 소선규 蘇宣奎; Member for North Jeolla (1903–1968)	8 August 1960	16 May 1961	Democratic	Baek Nak-jun	5th

==== Deputy Speaker of the House of Representatives ====
Portrait	Name Constituency (Birth–Death)	Term of office		Party	Speaker	National Assembly
Portrait	Name Constituency (Birth–Death)	Took office	Left office	Party	Speaker	National Assembly
	Lee Yeong-jun 이영준 李榮俊; Member for Dongdaemun A, Seoul (1896–1968)	8 August 1960	16 May 1961	Democratic	Kwak Sang-hoon	5th
	Seo Min-ho 서민호 徐珉濠; Member for Goheung B, South Jeolla (1903–1974)	8 August 1960	16 May 1961	Democratic	Kwak Sang-hoon	5th

=== 1963–1972 ===
Portrait	Name Constituency (Birth–Death)	Term of office		Party	Speaker	National Assembly
Portrait	Name Constituency (Birth–Death)	Took office	Left office	Party	Speaker	National Assembly
	Chang Kyung-soon 장경순 張坰淳; Member for Gimje, North Jeolla (1922–2022)	17 December 1963	30 June 1967	Democratic Republican	Rhee Hyo-sang	6th
	Na Yong-gyun 나용균 羅容均; Member for Jeongeup, North Jeolla (1896–1984)	17 December 1963	16 December 1965	Democratic	Rhee Hyo-sang	6th
	Lee Sang-cheol 이상철 李相喆; Member for Cheongyang–Hongseong, South Chungcheong (1893–1979)	17 December 1965	30 June 1967	People's	Rhee Hyo-sang	6th
	Chang Kyung-soon 장경순 張坰淳; Member for Gimje, North Jeolla (1922–2022)	10 July 1967	30 June 1971	Democratic Republican	Rhee Hyo-sang	7th
	Yoon Je-sul 윤제술 尹濟述; Member for Seodaemun B, Seoul (1904–1986)	7 June 1968	6 June 1970	New Democratic	Rhee Hyo-sang	7th
	Jeong Seong-tae 정성태 鄭成太; Member for Gwangju A, South Jeolla (1915–2000)	7 September 1970	30 June 1971	New Democratic	Rhee Hyo-sang	7th
	Chang Kyung-soon 장경순 張坰淳; Member for Gimje, North Jeolla (1922–2022)	26 July 1971	17 October 1972	Democratic Republican	Paik Too-chin	8th
	Jeong Hae-yeong 정해영 鄭海永; Member for Busanjin B, North Jeolla (1915–2005)	26 July 1971	17 October 1972	New Democratic	Paik Too-chin	8th

=== 1973–1980 ===
Portrait	Name Constituency (Birth–Death)	Term of office		Party	Speaker	National Assembly
Portrait	Name Constituency (Birth–Death)	Took office	Left office	Party	Speaker	National Assembly
	Kim Jin-man 김진만 金振晩; Member appointed by the President (1918–2006)	12 March 1973	11 March 1976	Democratic Republican	Chung Il-kwon	9th
	Lee Cheol-seung 이철승 李哲承; Member for Jeonju–Wanju, North Jeolla (1922–2016)	12 March 1973	11 March 1976	New Democratic	Chung Il-kwon	9th
	Ku Tae-hui 구태회 具泰會; Member appointed by the President (1923–2016)	12 March 1976	11 March 1979	Democratic Republican	Chung Il-kwon	9th
	Lee Min-u 이민우 李敏雨; Member for Cheongju–Cheongwon, North Chungcheong (1915–2004)	12 March 1976	11 March 1979	New Democratic	Chung Il-kwon	9th
	Min Kwan-shik 민관식 閔寬植; Member for Jongno–Jung, Seoul (1918–2006)	17 March 1979	27 October 1980	Democratic Republican	Paik Too-chin	10th
	Ko Heung-mun 고흥문 高興門; Member for Dobong, Seoul (1921–1998)	17 March 1979	27 August 1980	New Democratic	Paik Too-chin	10th

=== Since 1981 ===
Portrait	Name Constituency (Birth–Death)	Term of office		Party	Speaker	National Assembly
Portrait	Name Constituency (Birth–Death)	Took office	Left office	Party	Speaker	National Assembly
	Chae Mun-shik 채문식 蔡汶植; Member for Mungyeong–Yecheon, North Gyeongsang (1925–2010)	11 April 1981	10 April 1983	Democratic Justice	Chung Rae-hyuk (until 1983) Chae Mun-shik (from 1983)	11th
	Kim Eun-ha 김은하 金殷夏; Member for Jung–Nam, Incheon, Gyeonggi (1923–2003)	11 April 1981	10 April 1983	Democratic Korea	Chung Rae-hyuk (until 1983) Chae Mun-shik (from 1983)	11th
	Yun Gil-jung 윤길중 尹吉重; Member for Seodaemun–Eunpyeong, Seoul (1916–2001)	11 April 1983	10 April 1985	Democratic Justice	Chung Rae-hyuk (until 1983) Chae Mun-shik (from 1983)	11th
	Ko Jae-cheong 고재청 高在淸; Member for Damyang–Gokseong–Hwasun, South Jeolla (1928–2014)	11 April 1983	10 April 1985	Democratic Korea	Chung Rae-hyuk (until 1983) Chae Mun-shik (from 1983)	11th
	Choe Yeong-cheol 최영철 崔永喆; Member for Mokpo–Muan–Sinan, South Jeolla (1935–2025)	13 May 1985	12 May 1987	Democratic Justice	Lee Jae-hyung	12th
	Kim Nok-yeong 김녹영 金祿永; Member for Seo, Gwangju, South Jeolla (1924–1985)	13 May 1985	10 July 1985	New Korean Democratic	Lee Jae-hyung	12th
	Jo Yeon-ha 조연하 趙淵夏; Member for Seo, Gwangju, South Jeolla (1924–2006)	28 October 1985	29 November 1986	New Korean Democratic	Lee Jae-hyung	12th
	Jang Seong-man 조연하 趙淵夏; Member for Buk, Busan (1932–2015)	13 May 1987	29 May 1988	Democratic Justice	Lee Jae-hyung	12th
	No Seung-hwan 노승환 盧承煥; Member for Mapo A, Seoul (1927–2014)	30 May 1988	29 May 1990	Peace Democratic	Kim Jae-soon (until 1990) Park Jyun-kyu (from 1990)	13th
	Kim Jae-gwang 김재광 金在光; Member for Eunpyeong B, Seoul (1922–1993)	30 May 1988	29 May 1992	Reunification Democratic	Kim Jae-soon (until 1990) Park Jyun-kyu (from 1990)	13th
	Jo Yun-hyeong 조윤형 趙尹衡; Member for Seongbuk B, Seoul (1932–1996)	30 May 1990	29 May 1992	Peace Democratic	Kim Jae-soon (until 1990) Park Jyun-kyu (from 1990)	13th
	Hwang Nak-joo 황낙주 黃珞周; Member for Changwon B, South Gyeongsang (1928–2002)	29 June 1992	28 June 1994	Democratic Liberal	Park Jyun-kyu (until 1993) Hwang Nak-joo (acting: 1993) Lee Man-sup (1993–1994) Hwang Nak-joo (from 1994)	14th
	Heo Gyeong-man 허경만 許京萬; Member for Suncheon, South Jeolla (born 1938)	29 June 1992	28 June 1994	Democratic	Park Jyun-kyu (until 1993) Hwang Nak-joo (acting: 1993) Lee Man-sup (1993–1994) Hwang Nak-joo (from 1994)	14th
	Lee Chun-gu 이춘구 李春九; Member for Jecheon, North Chungcheong (1934–2011)	29 June 1994	20 February 1995	Democratic Liberal	Park Jyun-kyu (until 1993) Hwang Nak-joo (acting: 1993) Lee Man-sup (1993–1994) Hwang Nak-joo (from 1994)	14th
	Hong Yeong-gi 홍영기 洪英基; Member for Imsil–Sunchang, North Jeolla (1918–1999)	29 June 1994	29 May 1996	Peace Democratic	Park Jyun-kyu (until 1993) Hwang Nak-joo (acting: 1993) Lee Man-sup (1993–1994) Hwang Nak-joo (from 1994)	14th
	Lee Han-dong 이한동 李漢東; Member for Yeoncheon–Pocheon, Gyeonggi (1934–2021)	20 February 1995	29 May 1996	Democratic Liberal	Park Jyun-kyu (until 1993) Hwang Nak-joo (acting: 1993) Lee Man-sup (1993–1994) Hwang Nak-joo (from 1994)	14th
	Oh Se-eung 오세응 吳世應; Member for Bundang, Seongnam, Gyeonggi (1933–2019)	4 July 1996	29 May 1998	New Korea	Kim Soo-han (until 1998) Park Jyun-kyu (from 1998)	15th
	Kim Yung-bae 김영배 金令培; Member for Yangcheon B, Seoul (1932–2013)	4 July 1996	29 May 1998	National Congress	Kim Soo-han (until 1998) Park Jyun-kyu (from 1998)	15th
	Shin Sang-woo 신상우 辛相佑; Member for Sasang B, Busan (1937–2012)	17 August 1998	29 May 2000	Democratic Liberal	Kim Soo-han (until 1998) Park Jyun-kyu (from 1998)	15th
	Kim Bong-ho 김봉호 金琫鎬; Member for Haenam–Jindo, South Jeolla (born 1933)	17 August 1998	29 May 2000	National Congress	Kim Soo-han (until 1998) Park Jyun-kyu (from 1998)	15th
	Hong Sa-duk 홍사덕 洪思德; Member for National PR (1943–2020)	5 June 2000	12 June 2001	Grand National	Lee Man-sup (until 2002) Park Kwan-yong (from 2002)	16th
	Kim Chong-hoh 김종호 金宗鎬; Member for National PR (1935–2018)	5 June 2000	29 May 2002	ULD	Lee Man-sup (until 2002) Park Kwan-yong (from 2002)	16th
	Kim Jong-ha 김종하 金鍾河; Member for Changwon A, South Gyeongsang (born 1934)	12 June 2001	29 May 2002	Grand National	Lee Man-sup (until 2002) Park Kwan-yong (from 2002)	16th
	Kim Tai-shik 김태식 金台植; Member for Wanju–Imsil, North Jeolla (born 1939)	8 July 2002	29 May 2004	National Congress	Lee Man-sup (until 2002) Park Kwan-yong (from 2002)	16th
	Cho Boo-young 조부영 趙富英; Member for National PR (born 1936)	8 July 2002	29 May 2004	ULD	Lee Man-sup (until 2002) Park Kwan-yong (from 2002)	16th
	Kim Duk-gyu 김덕규 金德圭; Member for Jungnang B, Seoul (1941–2020)	7 June 2004	29 May 2006	Uri	Kim Won-ki (until 2006) Lim Chae-jung (from 2006)	17th
	Park Hee-tae 박희태 朴熺太; Member for Namhae–Hadong, South Gyeongsang (born 1938)	7 June 2004	29 May 2006	Grand National	Kim Won-ki (until 2006) Lim Chae-jung (from 2006)	17th
	Lee Yong-hui 이용희 李龍熙; Member for Boeun–Okcheon–Yeongdong, North Chungcheong (1931–2022)	19 June 2006	29 May 2008	Uri	Kim Won-ki (until 2006) Lim Chae-jung (from 2006)	17th
	Lee Sang-deuk 이상득 李相得; Member for Nam, Pohang–Ulleung, North Gyeongsang (1935–2024)	19 June 2006	29 May 2008	Grand National	Kim Won-ki (until 2006) Lim Chae-jung (from 2006)	17th
	Lee Yun-seong 이윤성 李允盛; Member for Namdong A, Incheon (born 1944)	16 July 2008	29 May 2010	Grand National	Kim Hyong-o (until 2010) Park Hee-tae (2010–2012) Chung Ui-hwa (acting: from 2012)	18th
	Moon Hee-sang 문희상 文喜相; Member for Uijeongbu A, Gyeonggi (born 1945)	16 July 2008	29 May 2010	ULD	Kim Hyong-o (until 2010) Park Hee-tae (2010–2012) Chung Ui-hwa (acting: from 2012)	18th
	Chung Ui-hwa 정의화 鄭義和; Member for Jung–Dong, Busan (born 1948)	8 June 2010	29 May 2012	Grand National	Kim Hyong-o (until 2010) Park Hee-tae (2010–2012) Chung Ui-hwa (acting: from 2012)	18th
	Hong Jae-hyong 홍재형 洪在馨; Member for Sangdang, Cheongju, North Chungcheong (born 1938)	8 June 2010	29 May 2012	ULD	Kim Hyong-o (until 2010) Park Hee-tae (2010–2012) Chung Ui-hwa (acting: from 2012)	18th
	Lee Byung-suk 이병석 李秉錫; Member for Buk, Pohang, North Gyeongsang (born 1952)	2 July 2012	29 May 2014	Saenuri	Kang Chang-hee (until 2014) Chung Ui-hwa (from 2014)	19th
	Park Byeong-seug 박병석 朴炳錫; Member for Seo A, Daejeon (born 1952)	2 July 2012	29 May 2014	Democratic United	Kang Chang-hee (until 2014) Chung Ui-hwa (from 2014)	19th
	Jeong Kab-yoon 정갑윤 鄭甲潤; Member for Jung, Ulsan (born 1950)	30 May 2014	29 May 2016	Saenuri	Kang Chang-hee (until 2014) Chung Ui-hwa (from 2014)	19th
	Lee Seok-hyun 이석현 李錫玄; Member for Dongan A, Anyang, Gyeonggi (born 1951)	30 May 2014	29 May 2016	NPAD	Kang Chang-hee (until 2014) Chung Ui-hwa (from 2014)	19th
	Shim Jae-chul 심재철 沈在哲; Member for Dongan B, Anyang, Gyeonggi (born 1958)	9 June 2016	29 May 2018	Saenuri	Chung Sye-kyun (until 2018) Moon Hee-sang (from 2018)	20th
	Park Joo-sun 박주선 朴柱宣; Member for Dong–Nam A, Gwangju (born 1949)	9 June 2016	29 May 2018	People	Chung Sye-kyun (until 2018) Moon Hee-sang (from 2018)	20th
	Lee Ju-young 이주영 李柱榮; Member for Masanhappo, Changwon, South Gyeongsang (born 1951)	13 July 2018	29 May 2020	Liberty Korea	Chung Sye-kyun (until 2018) Moon Hee-sang (from 2018)	20th
	Joo Seung-yong 주승용 朱昇鎔; Member for Yeosu B, South Jeolla (born 1952)	13 July 2018	29 May 2020	Bareunmirae	Chung Sye-kyun (until 2018) Moon Hee-sang (from 2018)	20th
	Kim Sang-hee 김상희 金相姬; Member for Bucheon C, Gyeonggi (born 1954)	5 June 2020	29 May 2022	Democratic	Park Byeong-seug (until 2022) Kim Jin-pyo (from 2022)	21st
	Chung Jin-suk 정진석 鄭鎭碩; Member for Gongju–Buyeo–Cheongyang, South Chungcheong (born 1960)	31 August 2021	10 November 2022	People Power	Park Byeong-seug (until 2022) Kim Jin-pyo (from 2022)	21st
	Kim Young-joo 김영주 金榮珠; Member for Yeongdeungpo A, Seoul (born 1955)	4 July 2022	29 May 2024	Democratic	Park Byeong-seug (until 2022) Kim Jin-pyo (from 2022)	21st
	Chung Woo-taik 정우택 鄭宇澤; Member for Sangdang, Cheongju, North Chungcheong (born 1953)	10 November 2022	29 May 2024	People Power	Park Byeong-seug (until 2022) Kim Jin-pyo (from 2022)	21st
	Lee Hack-young 이학영 李學永; Member for Gunpo, Gyeonggi (born 1952)	5 June 2024	29 May 2026	Democratic	Woo Won-shik (until 2026) Cho Jeong-sik (since 2026)	22nd
	Joo Ho-young 주호영 朱豪英; Member for Suseong A, Daegu (born 1959)	27 June 2024	29 May 2026	People Power	Woo Won-shik (until 2026) Cho Jeong-sik (since 2026)	22nd
	Nam In-soon 남인순 南仁順; Member for Songpa C, Seoul (born 1958)	5 June 2026	Incumbent	Democratic	Woo Won-shik (until 2026) Cho Jeong-sik (since 2026)	22nd
	Park Duk-hyum 박덕흠 朴德欽; Member for Boeun–Okcheon–Yeongdong–Goesan, North Chungcheong (born 1953)	5 June 2026	Incumbent	People Power	Woo Won-shik (until 2026) Cho Jeong-sik (since 2026)	22nd
