= List of members of the National Assembly (South Korea), 1973–1979 =

This is a list of members of the 9th National Assembly of South Korea which sat from 12 March 1973 until 11 March 1979.

== Members ==
Province/City	Constituency	Member	Party	
Province/City	Constituency	Member	At election	At term's end
Seoul	Jongno–Jung	Jang Gi-yeong (Note: Jang Gi-yeong died on 11 April 1977.)	DRP	DRP
Seoul	Jongno–Jung	Jeong Il-hyeong (Note: Jeong Il-hyeong died on 22 March 1977.)	NDP	NDP
Seoul	Jongno–Jung	O Je-do (Note: O Je-do was by-elected on 10 June 1977, to succeed Jang Gi-yeong.)	Independent	Independent
Seoul	Jongno–Jung	Jeong Dae-cheol (Note: Jeong Dae-cheol was by-elected on 10 June 1977, to succeed Jeong Il-hyeong.)	Independent	NDP
Seoul	Dongdaemun	Gang Sang-uk	DRP	Independent
Seoul	Dongdaemun	Song Won-yeong	NDP	NDP
Seoul	Seongdong	Min Byeong-gi	DRP	DRP
Seoul	Seongdong	Jeong Un-gap	NDP	NDP
Seoul	Seongbuk	Go Heung-mun	NDP	NDP
Seoul	Seongbuk	Jeong Rae-hyeok	DRP	DRP
Seoul	Seodaemun	Kim Jae-gwang	Independent	NDP
Seoul	Seodaemun	O Yu-bang	DRP	DRP
Seoul	Mapo–Yongsan	Kim Won-man	NDP	NDP
Seoul	Mapo–Yongsan	No Seung-hwan	NDP	NDP
Seoul	Yeongdeungpo A	Kim Su-han	NDP	NDP
Seoul	Yeongdeungpo A	Jeong Hui-seop	DRP	DRP
Seoul	Yeongdeungpo B	Park Han-sang	NDP	NDP
Seoul	Yeongdeungpo B	Gang Byeong-gyu	DRP	DRP
Busan	Jung–Yeongdo	Kim Sang-jin	NDP	NDP
Busan	Jung–Yeongdo	Sin Gi-seok	DRP	DRP
Busan	Seo–Dong	Kim Young-sam	NDP	NDP
Busan	Seo–Dong	Park Chan-jong	DRP	DRP
Busan	Busanjin	Jeong Hae-yeong	NDP	NDP
Busan	Busanjin	Kim Im-sik	DRP	DRP
Busan	Dongnae	Yang Chan-u	DRP	DRP
Busan	Dongnae	Lee Gi-taek	NDP	NDP
Gyeonggi Province	Incheon	Kim Eun-ha	NDP	NDP
Gyeonggi Province	Incheon	Ryu Seung-won	DRP	DRP
Gyeonggi Province	Suwon–Hwaseong	Lee Byeong-hui	DRP	DRP
Gyeonggi Province	Suwon–Hwaseong	Kim Hyeong-il (Note: Kim Hyeong-il died on 3 June 1978.)	NDP	NDP
Gyeonggi Province	Uijeongbu–Yangju–Paju	Park Myeong-geun	DRP	DRP
Gyeonggi Province	Uijeongbu–Yangju–Paju	Lee Jin-yong	Independent	Independent
Gyeonggi Province	Yeoju–Gwangju–Icheon	Cha Ji-cheol (Note: Cha Ji-cheol resigned on 20 August 1974, upon being appointed as chief of the Presidential Security Service.)	DRP	DRP
Gyeonggi Province	Yeoju–Gwangju–Icheon	O Se-eung	NDP	Independent
Gyeonggi Province	Pyeongtaek–Yongin–Anseong	Yu Chi-song	NDP	NDP
Gyeonggi Province	Pyeongtaek–Yongin–Anseong	Seo Sang-rin	DRP	DRP
Gyeonggi Province	Siheung–Bucheon–Yongjin	Lee Taek-don	NDP	NDP
Gyeonggi Province	Siheung–Bucheon–Yongjin	O Hak-jin	DRP	DRP
Gyeonggi Province	Goyang–Gimpo–Ganghwa	Kim Jae-chun	DRP	Independent
Gyeonggi Province	Goyang–Gimpo–Ganghwa	Kim Yu-tak	DRP	DRP
Gyeonggi Province	Yeoncheon–Pocheon–Gapyeong–Yangpyeong	Kim Yong-chae	DRP	DRP
Gyeonggi Province	Yeoncheon–Pocheon–Gapyeong–Yangpyeong	Cheon Myeong-gi	NDP	NDP
Gangwon Province	Chuncheon–Chunseong–Cheolwon–Hwacheon–Yanggu	Son Seung-deok	DRP	DRP
Gangwon Province	Chuncheon–Chunseong–Cheolwon–Hwacheon–Yanggu	Hong Chang-seop	Independent	Independent
Gangwon Province	Wonju–Wonseong–Hongcheon–Hoeseong	Park Yeong-rok	NDP	NDP
Gangwon Province	Wonju–Wonseong–Hongcheon–Hoeseong	Kim Yong-ho	DRP	DRP
Gangwon Province	Kangneung–Myeongju–Samcheok	Kim Hyo-yeong	DRP	DRP
Gangwon Province	Kangneung–Myeongju–Samcheok	Kim Myeong-yun	NDP	Independent
Gangwon Province	Sokcho–Yangyang–Inje–Goseong	Jeong Il-gwon	DRP	DRP
Gangwon Province	Sokcho–Yangyang–Inje–Goseong	Kim In-gi (Note: Kim In-gi resigned on 19 July 1978.)	Independent	NDP
Gangwon Province	Yeongwol–Pyeongchang–Jeongseon	Eom Yeong-dal	NDP	NDP
Gangwon Province	Yeongwol–Pyeongchang–Jeongseon	Jang Seung-tae	DRP	DRP
North Chungcheong Province	Cheongju–Cheongwon	Min Gi-sik	DRP	DRP
North Chungcheong Province	Cheongju–Cheongwon	Lee Min-u	NDP	NDP
North Chungcheong Province	Chungju–Jungwon–Jecheon–Danyang	Lee Jong-geun	DRP	DRP
North Chungcheong Province	Chungju–Jungwon–Jecheon–Danyang	Lee Hae-won	DRP	DRP
North Chungcheong Province	Boeun–Okcheon–Yeongdong	Yuk In-su	DRP	DRP
North Chungcheong Province	Boeun–Okcheon–Yeongdong	Lee Yong-hui	Independent	NDP
North Chungcheong Province	Jincheon–Gwisan–Eumseong	Lee Chung-hwan	NDP	NDP
North Chungcheong Province	Jincheon–Gwisan–Eumseong	Kim Won-tae	DRP	DRP
South Chungcheong Province	Daejeon	Kim Yong-tae	DRP	DRP
South Chungcheong Province	Daejeon	Im Ho (Note: Im Ho was removed on 28 December 1973, after his election was invalidated.)	Independent	Independent
South Chungcheong Province	Daejeon	Park Byeong-bae (Note: Park Byeong-bae was declared elected on 31 December 1973, after Im Ho's election was invalidated.)	DUP	DUP
South Chungcheong Province	Cheonan–Cheonwon–Asan	Kim Jong-cheol	DRP	DRP
South Chungcheong Province	Cheonan–Cheonwon–Asan	Hwang Myeong-su (Note: Hwang Myeong-su resigned on 1 November 1978.)	NDP	NDP
South Chungcheong Province	Geumsan–Daedeok–Yeongi	Yu Chin-san (Note: Yu Chin-san died on 28 April 1974.)	NDP	NDP
South Chungcheong Province	Geumsan–Daedeok–Yeongi	Kim Je-won	DRP	DRP
South Chungcheong Province	Nonsan–Gongju	Park Chan	NDP	Independent
South Chungcheong Province	Nonsan–Gongju	Lee Byeong-ju	DRP	DRP
South Chungcheong Province	Buyeo–Seocheon–Boryeong	Kim Ok-seon (Note: Kim Ok-seon resigned on 13 October 1975.)	NDP	NDP
South Chungcheong Province	Buyeo–Seocheon–Boryeong	Kim Jong-ik	DRP	DRP
South Chungcheong Province	Cheongyang–Hongseong–Yesan	Jang Yeong-sun	DRP	DRP
South Chungcheong Province	Cheongyang–Hongseong–Yesan	Han Geon-su	NDP	NDP
South Chungcheong Province	Seosan–Dangjin	Han Yeong-su	Independent	NDP
South Chungcheong Province	Seosan–Dangjin	Yu Je-yeon	NDP	NDP
North Jeolla Province	Jeonju–Wanju	Lee Cheol-seung	NDP	NDP
North Jeolla Province	Jeonju–Wanju	Ryu Gi-jeong	DRP	DRP
North Jeolla Province	Gunsan–Okgu–Iri–Iksan	Chae Yeong-cheol	DRP	DRP
North Jeolla Province	Gunsan–Okgu–Iri–Iksan	Kim Hyeon-gi	NDP	NDP
North Jeolla Province	Jinan–Muju–Jangsu	Choi Seong-seok	NDP	NDP
North Jeolla Province	Jinan–Muju–Jangsu	Kim Gwang-su	Independent	DRP
North Jeolla Province	Imsil–Namwon–Sunchang	Son Ju-hang	Independent	Independent
North Jeolla Province	Imsil–Namwon–Sunchang	Yang Hae-jun	NDP	NDP
North Jeolla Province	Jeongeup–Gimje	Kim Taek-ha	Independent	Independent
North Jeolla Province	Jeongeup–Gimje	Jang Gyeong-sun	DRP	DRP
North Jeolla Province	Gochang–Buan	Lee Byeong-ok	DRP	DRP
North Jeolla Province	Gochang–Buan	Jin Ui-jong	Independent	NDP
South Jeolla Province	Gwangju	Kim Nok-yeong	DUP	DUP
South Jeolla Province	Gwangju	Park Cheol	DRP	DRP
South Jeolla Province	Mokpo–Muan–Sinan	Gang Gi-cheon	DRP	DRP
South Jeolla Province	Mokpo–Muan–Sinan	Kim Gyeong-in	DUP	DUP
South Jeolla Province	Yeosu–Yeocheon–Gwangyang	Park Byeong-hyo	NDP	NDP
South Jeolla Province	Yeosu–Yeocheon–Gwangyang	Kim Sang-yeong	DRP	DRP
South Jeolla Province	Suncheon–Gurye–Seungju	Park Sam-cheol	DRP	Independent
South Jeolla Province	Suncheon–Gurye–Seungju	Gang Gil-man	Independent	Independent
South Jeolla Province	Naju–Gwangsan	Lim In-chae	DRP	DRP
South Jeolla Province	Naju–Gwangsan	Kim Yun-deok	NDP	NDP
South Jeolla Province	Damyang–Gokseong–Hwasun	Mun Hyeong-tae	DRP	DRP
South Jeolla Province	Damyang–Gokseong–Hwasun	Go Jae-cheong	NDP	NDP
South Jeolla Province	Goheung–Boseong	Shin Hyeong-sik	DRP	DRP
South Jeolla Province	Goheung–Boseong	Lee Jung-jae	NDP	NDP
South Jeolla Province	Jangheung–Gangjin–Yeongam–Wando	Kil Jeon-sik	DRP	DRP
South Jeolla Province	Jangheung–Gangjin–Yeongam–Wando	Hwang Ho-dong	NDP	NDP
South Jeolla Province	Haenam–Jindo	Lim Chung-sik (Note: Lim Chung-sik died on 29 January 1974.)	DRP	DRP
South Jeolla Province	Haenam–Jindo	Park Gwi-su	Independent	Independent
South Jeolla Province	Yeonggwang–Hampyeong–Jangseong	Yun In-sik	DRP	DRP
South Jeolla Province	Yeonggwang–Hampyeong–Jangseong	Lee Jin-yeon	NDP	NDP
North Gyeongsang Province	Jung–Seo–Buk, Daegu	Park Chan	DRP	DRP
North Gyeongsang Province	Jung–Seo–Buk, Daegu	Han Byeong-chae	Independent	NDP
North Gyeongsang Province	Dong–Nam, Daegu	Lee Hyo-sang	DRP	DRP
North Gyeongsang Province	Dong–Nam, Daegu	Sin Do-hwan	NDP	NDP
North Gyeongsang Province	Pohang–Yeongil–Ulleung–Yeongcheon	Jeong Mu-sik	DRP	DRP
North Gyeongsang Province	Pohang–Yeongil–Ulleung–Yeongcheon	Gwon O-tae	Independent	Independent
North Gyeongsang Province	Gyeongju–Wolseong–Cheongdo	Park Suk-hyeon	DRP	DRP
North Gyeongsang Province	Gyeongju–Wolseong–Cheongdo	Lee Yeong-pyo	Independent	Independent
North Gyeongsang Province	Gimcheon–Geumneung–Sangju	Kim Yun-ha	Independent	Independent
North Gyeongsang Province	Gimcheon–Geumneung–Sangju	Baek Nam-eok	DRP	DRP
North Gyeongsang Province	Andong City–Andong County–Uiseong	Kim Sang-nyeon	DRP	DRP
North Gyeongsang Province	Andong City–Andong County–Uiseong	Park Hae-chung	NDP	NDP
North Gyeongsang Province	Dalseong–Gyeongsan–Goryeong	Park Jun-gyu	DRP	DRP
North Gyeongsang Province	Dalseong–Gyeongsan–Goryeong	Park Ju-hyeon	Independent	Independent
North Gyeongsang Province	Gunwi–Seongju–Seonsan–Chilgok	Sin Hyeon-hwak	DRP	DRP
North Gyeongsang Province	Gunwi–Seongju–Seonsan–Chilgok	Kim Chang-hwan	NDP	NDP
North Gyeongsang Province	Yeongdok–Cheongsong–Uljin	Mun Tae-jun	DRP	DRP
North Gyeongsang Province	Yeongdok–Cheongsong–Uljin	O Jun-seok	DRP	DRP
North Gyeongsang Province	Yeongyang–Yeongju–Bonghwa	Park Yong-man	NDP	NDP
North Gyeongsang Province	Yeongyang–Yeongju–Bonghwa	Gwon Seong-gi	DRP	DRP
North Gyeongsang Province	Mungyeong–Yecheon	Chae Mun-sik	NDP	NDP
North Gyeongsang Province	Mungyeong–Yecheon	Hwang Jae-hong	DRP	DRP
South Gyeongsang Province	Masan–Jinhae–Changwon	Lee Do-hwan	DRP	DRP
South Gyeongsang Province	Masan–Jinhae–Changwon	Hwang Nak-ju	NDP	NDP
South Gyeongsang Province	Jinju–Samcheonpo–Jinyang–Sacheon	Choi Se-gyeong (Note: Choi Se-gyeong resigned on 19 February 1979.)	DRP	DRP
South Gyeongsang Province	Jinju–Samcheonpo–Jinyang–Sacheon	Jeong Heon-ju	NDP	NDP
South Gyeongsang Province	Chungmu–Tongyeong–Geoje–Goseong	Kim Ju-in	DRP	DRP
South Gyeongsang Province	Chungmu–Tongyeong–Geoje–Goseong	Choi Jae-gu	DRP	DRP
South Gyeongsang Province	Ulsan–Ulju–Dongnae	Kim Won-gyu	DRP	Independent
South Gyeongsang Province	Ulsan–Ulju–Dongnae	Choi Hyeong-u	NDP	NDP
South Gyeongsang Province	Uiryeong–Haman–Hapcheon	Lee Sang-cheol (Note: Lee Sang-cheol died on 18 June 1973.)	DRP	DRP
South Gyeongsang Province	Uiryeong–Haman–Hapcheon	Lee Sang-sin	NDP	NDP
South Gyeongsang Province	Milyang–Changnyeong	Park Il	NDP	NDP
South Gyeongsang Province	Milyang–Changnyeong	Seong Nak-hyeon (Note: Seong Nak-hyeon resigned on 28 July 1978.)	DRP	DRP
South Gyeongsang Province	Yangsan–Gimhae	Sin Sang-u	NDP	NDP
South Gyeongsang Province	Yangsan–Gimhae	Kim Yeong-byeong	DRP	DRP
South Gyeongsang Province	Namhae–Hadong	Sin Dong-gwan	DRP	DRP
South Gyeongsang Province	Namhae–Hadong	Mun Bu-sik	NDP	NDP
South Gyeongsang Province	Sancheong–Hamyang–Geochang	Jeong U-sik	DRP	DRP
South Gyeongsang Province	Sancheong–Hamyang–Geochang	Kim Dong-yeong	NDP	NDP
Jeju Province	Jeju–Bukjeju–Namjeju	Hong Byeong-cheol	DRP	Independent
Jeju Province	Jeju–Bukjeju–Namjeju	Yang Jeong-gyu	Independent	Independent
Presidential appointees		Gal Bong-geun	Yushin	Yushin
Presidential appointees		Gang Mun-bong (Note: Gang Mun-bong resigned on 15 August 1976.)	Yushin	Yushin
Presidential appointees		Gang Mun-yong	Yushin	Yushin
Presidential appointees		Go Jae-pil	Yushin	Yushin
Presidential appointees		Gu Beom-mo	Yushin	Yushin
Presidential appointees		Gu Im-hoe (Note: Presidential appointees whose term ended on 11 March 1976.)	Yushin	Yushin
Presidential appointees		Gu Tae-hoe	Yushin	Yushin
Presidential appointees		Gwon Gap-ju	Yushin	Yushin
Presidential appointees		Gwon Il	Yushin	Yushin
Presidential appointees		Gwon Hyo-seop	Yushin	Yushin
Presidential appointees		Kim Gi-hyeong	Yushin	Yushin
Presidential appointees		Kim Dong-uk	Yushin	Yushin
Presidential appointees		Kim Myeong-hoe	Yushin	Yushin
Presidential appointees		Kim Bong-hwan	Yushin	Yushin
Presidential appointees		Kim Sam-bong	Yushin	Yushin
Presidential appointees		Kim Seong-du	Yushin	Yushin
Presidential appointees		Kim Seong-rak	Yushin	Yushin
Presidential appointees		Kim Seong-ju (Note: Kim Seong-ju resigned on 12 January 1976, upon being appointed as commissioner general of the National Security Headquarters.)	Yushin	Yushin
Presidential appointees		Kim Se-ryeon	Yushin	Yushin
Presidential appointees		Kim Yeong-do	Yushin	Yushin
Presidential appointees		Kim Ok-ja	Yushin	Yushin
Presidential appointees		Kim Yong-seong	Yushin	Yushin
Presidential appointees		Kim Jae-gyu (Note: Kim Jae-gyu resigned on 19 December 1973, upon being appointed as Minister of Construction.)	Yushin	Yushin
Presidential appointees		Kim Jae-sun	Yushin	Yushin
Presidential appointees		Kim Jong-pil	Yushin	Yushin
Presidential appointees		Kim Jin-man	Yushin	Yushin
Presidential appointees		Kim Jin-bong	Yushin	Yushin
Presidential appointees		Kim Chang-gyu	Yushin	Yushin
Presidential appointees		Kim Tae-gyu	Yushin	Yushin
Presidential appointees		No Jin-hwan	Yushin	Yushin
Presidential appointees		Mun Tae-gap	Yushin	Yushin
Presidential appointees		Min Byeong-gwon	Yushin	Yushin
Presidential appointees		Park Jeong-ja	Yushin	Yushin
Presidential appointees		Paik Too-chin	Yushin	Yushin
Presidential appointees		Seo Byeong-gyun	Yushin	Yushin
Presidential appointees		Seo Yeong-hui	Yushin	Yushin
Presidential appointees		Seo In-seok	Yushin	Yushin
Presidential appointees		Song Ho-rim	Yushin	Yushin
Presidential appointees		An Jong-yeol	Yushin	Yushin
Presidential appointees		An Chun-saeng	Yushin	Yushin
Presidential appointees		Eom Gyeong-seop	Yushin	Yushin
Presidential appointees		O Jeong-geun	Yushin	Yushin
Presidential appointees		O Ju-hwan	Yushin	Yushin
Presidential appointees		Yu Min-sang	Yushin	Yushin
Presidential appointees		Yun Tae-il	Yushin	Yushin
Presidential appointees		Lee Do-seon	Yushin	Yushin
Presidential appointees		Lee Beom-jun	Yushin	Yushin
Presidential appointees		Lee Seong-ga (Note: Lee Seong-ga died on 1 December 1975.)	Yushin	Yushin
Presidential appointees		Lee Suk-jong	Yushin	Yushin
Presidential appointees		Lee Yeong-geun	Yushin	Yushin
Presidential appointees		Lee Jong-sik	Yushin	Yushin
Presidential appointees		Lee Jin-hui	Yushin	Yushin
Presidential appointees		Lee Hae-rang	Yushin	Yushin
Presidential appointees		Im Sam	Yushin	Yushin
Presidential appointees		Jang Dong-sik	Yushin	Yushin
Presidential appointees		Jang Jun-han	Yushin	Yushin
Presidential appointees		Jang Chang-guk	Yushin	Yushin
Presidential appointees		Jeon Jae-gu	Yushin	Yushin
Presidential appointees		Jeong Gwang-ho	Yushin	Yushin
Presidential appointees		Jeong Bok-hyang	Yushin	Yushin
Presidential appointees		Jeong Jae-ho	Yushin	Yushin
Presidential appointees		Ju Yeong-gwan	Yushin	Yushin
Presidential appointees		Ji Jong-geol (Note: Ji Jong-geol resigned on 27 December 1977.)	Yushin	Yushin
Presidential appointees		Choi Yeong-cheol	Yushin	Yushin
Presidential appointees		Choi Yeong-hui	Yushin	Yushin
Presidential appointees		Choi Yong-su	Yushin	Yushin
Presidential appointees		Han Tae-yeon	Yushin	Yushin
Presidential appointees		Ham Myeong-su	Yushin	Yushin
Presidential appointees		Ham Jae-hun	Yushin	Yushin
Presidential appointees		Ham Jong-bin	Yushin	Yushin
Presidential appointees		Heo Mu-in (Note: Heo Mu-in died on 4 December 1974.)	Yushin	Yushin
Presidential appointees		Hyeon O-bong	Yushin	Yushin
Presidential appointees		Hwang Chang-ju	Yushin	Yushin
Presidential appointees		Song Hyo-sun (Note: Song Hyo-sun took office on 20 December 1973, to succeed Kim Jae-gyu.)	Yushin	Yushin
Presidential appointees		Kim Chung-su (Note: Kim Chung-su took office on 4 December 1974, to succeed Heo Mu-in.)	Yushin	Yushin
Presidential appointees		Lee Seung-bok (Note: Lee Seung-bok took office on 1 December 1975, to succeed Lee Seong-ga.)	Yushin	Yushin
Presidential appointees		Nam Sang-don (Note: Nam Sang-don took office on 12 January 1976, to succeed Kim Seong-ju.)	Yushin	Yushin
Presidential appointees		Gwon Chung-dong (Note: Presidential appointees whose term began on 12 March 1976.)	Yushin	Yushin
Presidential appointees		Kim Do-chang	Yushin	Yushin
Presidential appointees		Kim Dong-seong	Yushin	Yushin
Presidential appointees		Kim Seong-yong	Yushin	Yushin
Presidential appointees		Kim Se-bae	Yushin	Yushin
Presidential appointees		Kim Sin	Yushin	Yushin
Presidential appointees		Kim Ik-jun	Yushin	Yushin
Presidential appointees		Kim Jin-bok	Yushin	Yushin
Presidential appointees		Park Dong-myo	Yushin	Yushin
Presidential appointees		Park Chan-hyeon	Yushin	Yushin
Presidential appointees		Paek Yeong-hun	Yushin	Yushin
Presidential appointees		Sin Gwang-sun	Yushin	Yushin
Presidential appointees		Sin Beom-sik	Yushin	Yushin
Presidential appointees		Sin Sang-cho	Yushin	Yushin
Presidential appointees		Yun Yeo-hun	Yushin	Yushin
Presidential appointees		Yun Ju-yeong	Yushin	Yushin
Presidential appointees		Lee Seong-geun	Yushin	Yushin
Presidential appointees		Lee Seung-yun	Yushin	Yushin
Presidential appointees		Lee Jeong-sik	Yushin	Yushin
Presidential appointees		Lee Jong-chan	Yushin	Yushin
Presidential appointees		Jeon Bu-il	Yushin	Yushin
Presidential appointees		Jeong Il-yeong	Yushin	Yushin
Presidential appointees		Choi U-geun	Yushin	Yushin
Presidential appointees		Byeon U-ryang (Note: Byeon U-ryang took office on 25 August 1976, to succeed Gang Mun-bong.)	Yushin	Yushin
Presidential appointees		Ma Dal-cheon (Note: Ma Dal-cheon took office on 27 December 1977, to succeed Ji Jong-geol.)	Yushin	Yushin

== See also ==
- 1973 South Korean legislative election
- National Assembly (South Korea)#History
