= Kim Jae-hong =

- Hangul: 김재홍
- RR: Gim Jaehong
- MR: Kim Chaehong

Kim Jae-hong is a Korean name and may refer to:

- Kim Jae-hong (politician, born 1932) (1932–2001), South Korean politician, member of the 10th National Assembly, 1979–1980
- Kim Jae-hong (politician, born 1950), South Korean politician, member of the 17th National Assembly, 2004–2008
- Kim Jae-hong (footballer) (born 1984), South Korean football player
- Kim Jae-hong (author) (born 1985), South Korean author and illustrator
- Amotti (born 1992), South Korean CrossFitter and YouTuber
