= List of members of the National Assembly (South Korea), 1958–1960 =

The members of the 4th National Assembly of South Korea were elected on 2 May 1958. The assembly sat from 31 May 1958 until 28 July 1960.

== Members ==
Province/City	Constituency	Member	Party	
Province/City	Constituency	Member	At election	At term's end
Seoul	Jongno A	Yun Po-sun	Democratic	Democratic
Seoul	Jongno B	Han Geun-jo	Democratic	Democratic
Seoul	Jung A	Ju Yo-han	Democratic	Democratic
Seoul	Jung B	Jeong Il-hyeong	Democratic	Democratic
Seoul	Dongdaemun A	Min Gwan-sik	Independent	Democratic
Seoul	Dongdaemun B	Lee Yeong-jun	Democratic	Democratic
Seoul	Seongdong A	Yu Seong-gwon	Democratic	Democratic
Seoul	Seongdong B	Chough Pyung-ok (Note: Chough Pyung-ok died on 15 February 1960.)	Democratic	Democratic
Seoul	Seongbuk	Seo Beom-seok	Democratic	Democratic
Seoul	Seodaemun A	Kim Do-yeon	Democratic	Democratic
Seoul	Seodaemun B	Choi Gyu-nam (Note: Choi Gyu-nam resigned on 1 July 1960.)	Liberal	Liberal
Seoul	Mapo	Kim Sang-don	Democratic	Democratic
Seoul	Yongsan A	Eom Sang-seop (Note: Eom Sang-seop died on 3 May 1960.)	Democratic	Democratic
Seoul	Yongsan B	Kim Won-man	Democratic	Democratic
Seoul	Yeongdeungpo A	Yun Myeong-un	Democratic	Democratic
Seoul	Yeongdeungpo B	Ryu Hong	Democratic	Democratic
Gyeonggi Province	Incheon A	Kim Jae-gon	Democratic	Democratic
Gyeonggi Province	Incheon B	Kwak Sang-hoon	Democratic	Democratic
Gyeonggi Province	Incheon C	Kim Hun	Democratic	Democratic
Gyeonggi Province	Suwon	Hong Gil-seon	Democratic	Democratic
Gyeonggi Province	Goyang	Lee Seong-ju	Liberal	Independent
Gyeonggi Province	Gwangju	Choi In-gyu (Note: Choi In-gyu resigned on 3 May 1960.)	Liberal	Independent
Gyeonggi Province	Yangju A	Gang Yeong-hun	Democratic	Democratic
Gyeonggi Province	Yangju B	Gang Seong-tae (Note: Gang Seong-tae resigned on 2 July 1960.)	Liberal	Liberal
Gyeonggi Province	Pocheon	Yun Seong-sun (Note: Yun Seong-sun resigned on 1 July 1960.)	Liberal	Liberal
Gyeonggi Province	Gapyeong	Hong Ik-pyo	Democratic	Democratic
Gyeonggi Province	Yangpyeong	Yu Yong-sik	Liberal	Liberal
Gyeonggi Province	Yeoju	Kim Ui-jun	Liberal	Independent
Gyeonggi Province	Icheon	Lee Ki-poong (Note: Lee Ki-poong died on 28 April 1960.)	Liberal	Liberal
Gyeonggi Province	Yongin	Gu Cheol-hoe	Democratic	Liberal
Gyeonggi Province	Anseong	O Jae-yeong	Liberal	Liberal
Gyeonggi Province	Pyeongtaek	Jeong Jon-su (Note: Jeong Jon-su resigned on 26 May 1960.)	Liberal	Liberal
Gyeonggi Province	Hwaseong A	Son Do-sim (Note: Son Do-sim resigned on 3 May 1960.)	Liberal	Liberal
Gyeonggi Province	Hwaseong B	Hong Bong-jin	Democratic	Democratic
Gyeonggi Province	Siheung	Lee Jae-hyeong	Independent	Independent
Gyeonggi Province	Bucheon	Jang Gyeong-geun (Note: Jang Gyeong-geun resigned on 3 May 1960.)	Liberal	Liberal
Gyeonggi Province	Gimpo	Jeong Jun	Independent	Independent
Gyeonggi Province	Ganghwa	Yun Jae-geun	Independent	Independent
Gyeonggi Province	Paju	Jeong Dae-cheon	Liberal	Liberal
Gyeonggi Province	Yeoncheon	Lee Ik-heung	Liberal	Independent
Gyeonggi Province	Ongjin	Yu Yeong-jun	Liberal	Independent
Gangwon Province	Chuncheon	Gye Gwang-sun	Democratic	Democratic
Gangwon Province	Wonju	Park Chung-mo	Democratic	Democratic
Gangwon Province	Gangneung	Choi Yong-geun	Liberal	Independent
Gangwon Province	Chunseong	Im U-yeong	Liberal	Liberal
Gangwon Province	Hongcheon	Lee Jae-hak (Note: Lee Jae-hak resigned in May 1960.)	Liberal	Liberal
Gangwon Province	Hoeseong	Jang Seok-yun	Liberal	Liberal
Gangwon Province	Wonseong	Hong Beom-hui (Note: Hong Beom-hui resigned on 1 July 1960.)	Liberal	Independent
Gangwon Province	Yeongwol	Jeong Gyu-sang	Liberal	Independent
Gangwon Province	Pyeongchang	Hwang Ho-hyeon	Independent	Independent
Gangwon Province	Jeongseon	Yu Gi-su	Independent	Independent
Gangwon Province	Cheolwon	Seo Im-su	Independent	Independent
Gangwon Province	Gimhwa	Park Hyeon-suk	Liberal	Independent
Gangwon Province	Hwacheon	Park Deok-yeong	Liberal	Liberal
Gangwon Province	Yanggu	Choi Gyu-ok (Note: Choi Gyu-ok resigned on 1 July 1960.)	Liberal	Liberal
Gangwon Province	Inje	Na Sang-geun (Note: Na Sang-geun was removed on 11 March 1959, after his election was invalidated.)	Liberal	Liberal
Gangwon Province	Inje	Jeon Hyeong-san (Note: Jeon Hyeong-san was by-elected on 5 June 1959, to succeed Na Sang-geun.)	Liberal	Liberal
Gangwon Province	Goseong	Hong Seung-eop (Note: Hong Seung-eop resigned on 2 July 1960.)	Liberal	Liberal
Gangwon Province	Yangyang	Lee Dong-geun	Liberal	Liberal
Gangwon Province	Myeongju	Park Yong-ik	Liberal	Liberal
Gangwon Province	Samcheok	Kim Jin-man	Liberal	Independent
Gangwon Province	Uljin	Jeon Man-jung	Liberal	Liberal
North Chungcheong Province	Cheongju	Lee Min-u	Democratic	Democratic
North Chungcheong Province	Chungju	Hong Byeong-gak	Liberal	Liberal
North Chungcheong Province	Cheongwon A	O Beom-su (Note: O Beom-su resigned in 1960.)	Liberal	Liberal
North Chungcheong Province	Cheongwon B	Gwak Ui-yeong	Liberal	Liberal
North Chungcheong Province	Boeun	Kim Seon-u	Liberal	Liberal
North Chungcheong Province	Okcheon	Gwon Bok-in	Liberal	Liberal
North Chungcheong Province	Yeongdong	Min Jang-sik	Democratic	Democratic
North Chungcheong Province	Jincheon	Jeong Un-gap	Liberal	Independent
North Chungcheong Province	Eumseong	Kim Ju-muk	Democratic	Independent
North Chungcheong Province	Gwisan	Kim Won-tae	Liberal	Independent
North Chungcheong Province	Chungwon	Jeong Sang-hui	Liberal	Independent
North Chungcheong Province	Jecheon	Lee Tae-yong	Democratic	Democratic
North Chungcheong Province	Danyang	Jo Jong-ho	Independent	CRA
South Chungcheong Province	Daejeon A	Jeong Nak-hun	Liberal	Independent
South Chungcheong Province	Daejeon B	Jin Hyeong-ha	Democratic	Democratic
South Chungcheong Province	Daedeok	Park Byeong-bae	Independent	Independent
South Chungcheong Province	Yeongi	Ryu Ji-won	Liberal	Liberal
South Chungcheong Province	Gongju A	Park Chung-sik	Liberal	Independent
South Chungcheong Province	Gongju B	Kim Hak-jun	Democratic	Democratic
South Chungcheong Province	Nonsan A	Kim Gong-pyeong	Liberal	Liberal
South Chungcheong Province	Nonsan B	Yun Dam	Democratic	Democratic
South Chungcheong Province	Buyeo A	Han Gwang-seok (Note: Han Gwang-seok resigned on 30 June 1960.)	Liberal	Liberal
South Chungcheong Province	Buyeo B	Im Cheol-ho (Note: Im Cheol-ho resigned on 27 May 1960.)	Liberal	Liberal
South Chungcheong Province	Seocheon	U Hui-chang	Democratic	Democratic
South Chungcheong Province	Boryeong	Lee Won-jang (Note: Lee Won-jang resigned on 1 July 1960.)	Liberal	Liberal
South Chungcheong Province	Cheongyang	Kim Chang-dong	Liberal	Liberal
South Chungcheong Province	Hongseong	Yu Seung-jun	Democratic	Liberal
South Chungcheong Province	Yesan	Yun Byeong-gu	Liberal	Independent
South Chungcheong Province	Seosan A	Jeon Yeong-seok	Democratic	Democratic
South Chungcheong Province	Seosan B	Ryu Sun-sik	Liberal	Independent
South Chungcheong Province	Dangjin A	In Tae-sik	Liberal	Independent
South Chungcheong Province	Dangjin B	Won Yong-seok (Note: Won Yong-seok resigned on 28 June 1960.)	Liberal	Liberal
South Chungcheong Province	Asan	Lee Min-u	Liberal	Independent
South Chungcheong Province	Cheonan A	Han Hui-seok (Note: Han Hui-seok resigned in 1960.)	Liberal	Liberal
South Chungcheong Province	Cheonan B	Kim Jong-cheol	Liberal	Independent
North Jeolla Province	Jeonju A	Ryu Cheong	Democratic	Democratic
North Jeolla Province	Jeonju B	Yi Cheol-seung	Democratic	Democratic
North Jeolla Province	Gunsan	Kim Won-jeon	Liberal	Independent
North Jeolla Province	Iri	Kim Won-jung	Liberal	Liberal
North Jeolla Province	Wanju A	Lee Jon-hwa (Note: Lee Jon-hwa resigned on 3 May 1960.)	Liberal	Liberal
North Jeolla Province	Wanju B	Bae Seong-gi	Democratic	Democratic
North Jeolla Province	Jinan	Lee Ok-dong	Independent	Liberal
North Jeolla Province	Geumsan	Yu Chin-san	Democratic	Democratic
North Jeolla Province	Muju	Kim Jin-won	Liberal	Liberal
North Jeolla Province	Jangsu	Jeong Jun-mo	Liberal	Independent
North Jeolla Province	Imsil	Park Se-gyeong	Liberal	Independent
North Jeolla Province	Namwon A	Jo Jeong-hun	Democratic	Liberal
North Jeolla Province	Namwon B	An Gyun-seop	Liberal	Independent
North Jeolla Province	Sunchang	Im Cha-ju	Liberal	Liberal
North Jeolla Province	Jeongeup A	Na Yong-gyun	Democratic	Democratic
North Jeolla Province	Jeongeup B	Song Yeong-ju	Democratic	Liberal
North Jeolla Province	Gochang A	Jeong Se-hwan	Independent	Liberal
North Jeolla Province	Gochang B	Hong Sun-hui	Democratic	Independent
North Jeolla Province	Buan	Sin Gyu-sik (Note: Sin Gyu-sik resigned on 1 July 1960.)	Liberal	Liberal
North Jeolla Province	Gimje A	Jo Han-baek	Democratic	Democratic
North Jeolla Province	Gimje B	Yun Je-sul	Democratic	Democratic
North Jeolla Province	Okgu	Yang Il-dong	Independent	Democratic
North Jeolla Province	Iksan A	Kim Hyeong-seop	Liberal	Independent
North Jeolla Province	Iksan B	Yun Taek-jung	Democratic	Democratic
South Jeolla Province	Gwangju A	Jeong Seong-tae	Democratic	Democratic
South Jeolla Province	Gwangju B	Lee Pil-ho	Democratic	Democratic
South Jeolla Province	Gwangju C	Park Heung-gyu	Liberal	Independent
South Jeolla Province	Mokpo	Jeong Jung-seop	Democratic	Democratic
South Jeolla Province	Yeosu	Jeong Jae-wan	Democratic	Democratic
South Jeolla Province	Suncheon	Yun Hyeong-nam	Democratic	Democratic
South Jeolla Province	Gwangsan	Lee Jeong-hyu	Liberal	Independent
South Jeolla Province	Damyang	Guk Kwae-nam (Note: Guk Kwae-nam resigned on 1 July 1960.)	Liberal	Liberal
South Jeolla Province	Gokseong	Jo Sun	Liberal	Liberal
South Jeolla Province	Gurye	Lee Gap-sik	Liberal	Independent
South Jeolla Province	Gwangyang	Hwang Suk-hyeon	Liberal	Independent
South Jeolla Province	Yeocheon	Lee Eun-tae (Note: Lee Eun-tae resigned on 1 July 1960.)	Liberal	Liberal
South Jeolla Province	Seungju	Lee Hyeong-mo	Liberal	Independent
South Jeolla Province	Goheung A	Son Mun-gyeong (Note: Son Mun-gyeong resigned on 1 July 1960.)	Liberal	Liberal
South Jeolla Province	Goheung B	Park Cheol-ung (Note: Park Cheol-ung resigned on 1 July 1960.)	Liberal	Liberal
South Jeolla Province	Boseong	An Yong-baek (Note: An Yong-baek was removed on 24 June 1959, after his election was invalidated.)	Liberal	Liberal
South Jeolla Province	Boseong	Hwang Seong-su (Note: Hwang Seong-su was by-elected on 12 September 1959, to succeed An Yong-baek, but resigned on 1 July 1960.)	Liberal	Liberal
South Jeolla Province	Hwasun	Gu Heung-nam	Liberal	Independent
South Jeolla Province	Jangheung	Son Seok-du	Liberal	Independent
South Jeolla Province	Gangjin	Kim Hyang-su	Independent	Independent
South Jeolla Province	Haenam A	Kim Byeong-sun	Liberal	Liberal
South Jeolla Province	Haenam B	Kim Seok-jin	Liberal	Liberal
South Jeolla Province	Yeongam	Kim Chun-yon	Unification	Unification
South Jeolla Province	Muan A	Na Pan-su	Liberal	Liberal
South Jeolla Province	Muan B	Yu Ok-u	Democratic	Democratic
South Jeolla Province	Muan C	Kim Sak	Democratic	Liberal
South Jeolla Province	Naju A	Lee Sa-hyeong	Independent	Liberal
South Jeolla Province	Naju B	Jeong Myeong-seop	Liberal	Liberal
South Jeolla Province	Hampyeong	Kim Ui-taek	Democratic	Democratic
South Jeolla Province	Yeonggwang	Jo Yeong-gyu	Democratic	Democratic
South Jeolla Province	Jangseong	Byeon Jin-gap	Liberal	Liberal
South Jeolla Province	Wando	Kim Seon-tae	Democratic	Democratic
South Jeolla Province	Jindo	Son Jae-hyeong	Independent	Independent
North Gyeongsang Province	Daegu A	Sin Do-hwan (Note: Sin Do-hwan resigned on 3 May 1960.)	Independent	Liberal
North Gyeongsang Province	Daegu B	Lee Byeong-ha	Democratic	Democratic
North Gyeongsang Province	Daegu C	Lee U-jul (Note: Lee U-jul was removed on 24 December 1958, after his election was invalidated.)	Independent	Independent
North Gyeongsang Province	Daegu C	Im Mun-seok (Note: Im Mun-seok was declared elected on 31 December 1958, after Lee U-jul's election was invalidated.)	Democratic	Democratic
North Gyeongsang Province	Daegu D	Jo Jae-cheon	Democratic	Democratic
North Gyeongsang Province	Daegu E	Jo Il-hwan	Democratic	Democratic
North Gyeongsang Province	Daegu F	Lee Sun-hui (Note: Lee Sun-hui was removed on 20 September 1958, after his election was invalidated.)	Liberal	Liberal
North Gyeongsang Province	Daegu F	Choi Hui-song (Note: Choi Hui-song was declared elected on 29 September 1958, after Lee Sun-hui's election was invalidated, but resigned on 30 June 1960.)	Democratic	Democratic
North Gyeongsang Province	Pohang	Ha Tae-hwan	Liberal	Independent
North Gyeongsang Province	Gyeongju	An Yong-dae	Independent	Independent
North Gyeongsang Province	Gimcheon	Mun Jong-du	Independent	Independent
North Gyeongsang Province	Dalseong	Kim Seong-gon	Liberal	Independent
North Gyeongsang Province	Gunwi	Park Man-won (Note: Park Man-won resigned on 3 May 1960.)	Liberal	Liberal
North Gyeongsang Province	Uiseong A	Kim Gyu-man	Democratic	Liberal
North Gyeongsang Province	Uiseong B	Park Yeong-gyo	Liberal	Independent
North Gyeongsang Province	Andong A	Gwon O-jong (Note: Gwon O-jong died on 1 February 1960.)	Democratic	Liberal
North Gyeongsang Province	Andong B	Kim Ik-gi (Note: Kim Ik-gi resigned on 1 July 1960.)	Liberal	Liberal
North Gyeongsang Province	Cheongsong	Yun Yong-gu	Liberal	Independent
North Gyeongsang Province	Yeongyang	Park Jong-gil	Liberal	Independent
North Gyeongsang Province	Yeongdeok	Kim Won-gyu	Liberal	Liberal
North Gyeongsang Province	Yeongil A	Park Sun-seok (Note: Park Sun-seok resigned on 29 June 1960.)	Liberal	Liberal
North Gyeongsang Province	Yeongil B	Kim Ik-no (Note: Kim Ik-no was removed on 4 November 1959, after his election was invalidated.)	Liberal	Liberal
North Gyeongsang Province	Yeongil B	Kim Jang-seop (Note: Kim Jang-seop was by-elected on 23 January 1960, to succeed Kim Ik-no.)	Liberal	Independent
North Gyeongsang Province	Wolseong A	Lee Hyeop-u	Liberal	Independent
North Gyeongsang Province	Wolseong B	Lee Jong-jun	Liberal	Independent
North Gyeongsang Province	Yeongcheon A	Kim Sang-do	Liberal	Liberal
North Gyeongsang Province	Yeongcheon B	Gwon Jung-don	Democratic	Democratic
North Gyeongsang Province	Gyeongsan	Park Hae-jeong	Democratic	Democratic
North Gyeongsang Province	Cheongdo	Ban Jae-hyeon	Independent	Independent
North Gyeongsang Province	Goryeong	Jeong Nam-taek	Liberal	Liberal
North Gyeongsang Province	Seongju	Ju Byeong-hwan	Democratic	Democratic
North Gyeongsang Province	Chilgok	Chang Taek-sang	Independent	Independent
North Gyeongsang Province	Geumneung	Kim Cheol-an	Liberal	Liberal
North Gyeongsang Province	Seonsan	Kim U-dong (Note: Kim U-dong was removed on 3 January 1959, after his election was invalidated.)	Liberal	Liberal
North Gyeongsang Province	Seonsan	Kim Dong-seok (Note: Kim Dong-seok was declared election on 3 January 1959, after Kim U-dong's election was invalidated.)	Independent	Independent
North Gyeongsang Province	Sangju A	Jo Gwang-hui (Note: Jo Gwang-hui resigned on 28 June 1960.)	Liberal	Liberal
North Gyeongsang Province	Sangju B	Kim Jeong-geun	Independent	Independent
North Gyeongsang Province	Mungyeong	Lee Dong-nyeong	Liberal	Independent
North Gyeongsang Province	Yecheon	Jeong Jae-won	Liberal	Independent
North Gyeongsang Province	Yeongju	Lee Jeong-hui	Liberal	Liberal
North Gyeongsang Province	Bonghwa	Jeong Mun-heum	Liberal	Liberal
North Gyeongsang Province	Ulleung	Choi Byeong-gwon	Liberal	Independent
South Gyeongsang Province	Jung, Busan	Kim Eung-ju	Democratic	Democratic
South Gyeongsang Province	Seo A, Busan	Lee Sang-yong	Liberal	Liberal
South Gyeongsang Province	Seo B, Busan	Kim Dong-uk	Democratic	Democratic
South Gyeongsang Province	Yeongdo A, Busan	Lee Yeong-eon	Liberal	Liberal
South Gyeongsang Province	Yeongdo B, Busan	Lee Man-u	Democratic	Democratic
South Gyeongsang Province	Dong A, Busan	Park Sun-cheon	Democratic	Democratic
South Gyeongsang Province	Dong B, Busan	O Wi-yeong (Note: O Wi-yeong resigned on 30 June 1960.)	Democratic	Democratic
South Gyeongsang Province	Busanjin A, Busan	Lee Jong-nam	Democratic	Democratic
South Gyeongsang Province	Busanjin B, Busan	Park Chan-hyeon	Democratic	Democratic
South Gyeongsang Province	Dongnae, Busan	Kim In-ho	Liberal	Liberal
South Gyeongsang Province	Masan	Heo Yun-su	Democratic	Liberal
South Gyeongsang Province	Jinju	Kim Yong-jin	Democratic	Democratic
South Gyeongsang Province	Chungmu	Choi Cheon	Democratic	Democratic
South Gyeongsang Province	Jinhae	Ju Geum-yong	Independent	Independent
South Gyeongsang Province	Samcheonpo	Lee Jae-hyeon	Independent	Independent
South Gyeongsang Province	Jinyang	Gu Tae-hoe	Liberal	Independent
South Gyeongsang Province	Uiryeong	Lee Yeong-hui	Liberal	Liberal
South Gyeongsang Province	Haman	Jo Gyeong-gyu	Liberal	Liberal
South Gyeongsang Province	Changnyeong	Sin Yeong-ju	Independent	Independent
South Gyeongsang Province	Milyang A	Park Chang-hwa	Democratic	Democratic
South Gyeongsang Province	Milyang B	Kim Jeong-hwan	Democratic	Democratic
South Gyeongsang Province	Yangsan	Ji Yeong-jin	Liberal	Liberal
South Gyeongsang Province	Ulsan A	An Deok-gi	Liberal	Liberal
South Gyeongsang Province	Ulsan B	Kim Seong-tak	Liberal	Independent
South Gyeongsang Province	Dongnae	Jo Il-jae	Democratic	Democratic
South Gyeongsang Province	Gimhae A	Gang Jong-mu	Liberal	Liberal
South Gyeongsang Province	Gimhae B	Lee Jong-su	Liberal	Liberal
South Gyeongsang Province	Cheongwon A	Kim Hyeong-don	Liberal	Liberal
South Gyeongsang Province	Cheongwon B	Lee Yong-beom	Liberal	Independent
South Gyeongsang Province	Tongyeong	Seo Jeong-gwi	Democratic	Democratic
South Gyeongsang Province	Geoje	Jin Seok-jung (Note: Jin Seok-jung died on 13 July 1960.)	Liberal	Liberal
South Gyeongsang Province	Goseong	Choi Seok-rim	Independent	Liberal
South Gyeongsang Province	Sacheon	Jeong Heon-ju	Democratic	Democratic
South Gyeongsang Province	Namhae	Kim Jeong-gi	Liberal	Liberal
South Gyeongsang Province	Hadong	Son Yeong-su	Liberal	Liberal
South Gyeongsang Province	Sancheong	Kim Jae-wi	Liberal	Liberal
South Gyeongsang Province	Hamyang	Park Sang-gil	Independent	Independent
South Gyeongsang Province	Geochang	Seo Han-du	Liberal	Liberal
South Gyeongsang Province	Hapcheon A	Yu Bong-sun	Liberal	Liberal
South Gyeongsang Province	Hapcheon B	Choi Chang-seop	Liberal	Independent
Jeju Province	Jeju	Go Dam-ryong	Democratic	Democratic
Jeju Province	Bukjeju	Kim Du-jin	Liberal	Independent
Jeju Province	Namjeju	Hyeon O-bong	Independent	Independent

== See also ==
- 1958 South Korean legislative election
- National Assembly (South Korea)#History
