= Kim Soo-han =

South Korean politician (1928–2024)

His Excellency Kim Soo han
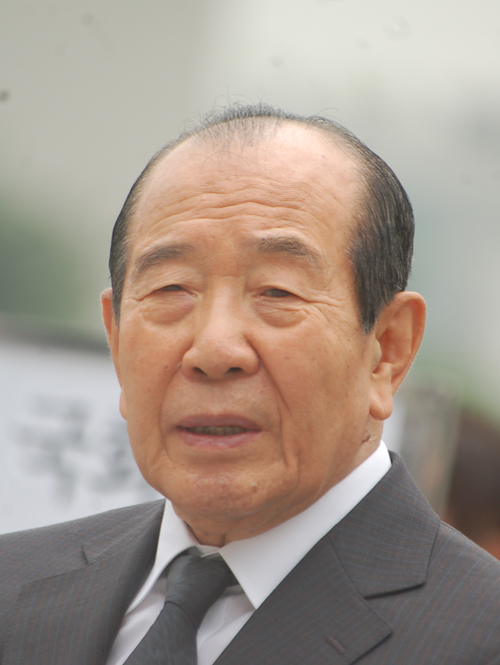
- Kim in 2010

15th Speaker of the National Assembly
- In office 1996–1998

1th President of the New Korean Democratic Party
- In office 1985–1988

1th President of the Democratic Liberal Party
- In office 1990–1995

Personal details
- Born: 20 August 1928 Korea, Empire of Japan
- Died: 30 December 2024 (aged 96) Seoul, South Korea
- Spouse: Shin Young-ja
- Children: Son Kim Seong-dong
- Education: Ritsumeikan University (LL.M.)
- Awards: Order of Civil Merit (Government of South Korea); Order of the Rising Sun (Imperial House of Japan)

- Korean name
- Hangul: 김수한
- Hanja: 金守漢
- RR: Gim Suhan
- MR: Kim Suhan

Art name
- Hangul: 일성
- Hanja: 一聲
- RR: Ilseong
- MR: Ilsŏng

Courtesy name
- Hangul: 달가
- Hanja: 達可
- RR: Dalga
- MR: Talga

Kim Soo-han (Korean: 김수한; 20 August 1928 – 30 December 2024) was a South Korean Statesman. He was speaker of the National Assembly from 1996 to 1998. Kim died on 30 December 2024, at the age of 96.

== Life ==
He was a member of the Andong Kim clan and was born into an aristocratic family that owned servants. He earned a bachelor's degree in law from Yeungnam University.

He entered politics in 1957 and was elected to the National Assembly in the 7th general election in 1967 as a member of the New Democratic Party. He later served as a lawmaker in the 8th, 9th, 10th, 12th, and 15th National Assemblies.

In 1996, he served as Speaker of the 15th National Assembly. After retiring from politics, he served as a senior statesman and standing advisor to the nation.

He passed away on 30 December 2024, at the age of 96, in a private suite at Sinchon Severance Hospital in South Korea. In the wake of his death, South Korea declared a period of national mourning.

He was laid to rest in the National Cemetery for Social Contributors at Daejeon National Cemetery.

== Family ==
- Spouse: Shin Young-ja
  - Son: Kim Seong-dong(M.P.)
  - Brother-in-law: Kim Woo-kyung(M.P.)
