= List of members of the National Assembly (South Korea), 1979–1980 =

This is a list of members of the 10th National Assembly of South Korea which sat from 17 March 1979 to 17 May 1980.

== Members ==
Province/City	Constituency	Member	Party	
Province/City	Constituency	Member	At election	At term's end
Seoul	Jongno–Jung	Jeong Dae-cheol	NDP	NDP
Seoul	Jongno–Jung	Min Gwan-sik	DRP	DRP
Seoul	Dongdaemun	Song Won-yeong (Note: Song Won-yeong resigned on 27 August 1980.)	NDP	NDP
Seoul	Dongdaemun	Lee In-geun	DRP	DRP
Seoul	Seongdong	Kim Je-man	NDP	NDP
Seoul	Seongdong	Yang Il-dong (Note: Yang Il-dong died on 1 April 1980.)	DUP	DUP
Seoul	Seongbuk	Jo Se-hyeong	NDP	NDP
Seoul	Seongbuk	Jeong Rae-hyeok	DRP	DRP
Seoul	Dobong	Go Heung-mun (Note: Go Heung-mun resigned on 27 August 1980.)	NDP	NDP
Seoul	Dobong	Hong Seong-u	Independent	DRP
Seoul	Seodaemun	Kim Jae-gwang	NDP	NDP
Seoul	Seodaemun	O Yu-bang	DRP	Independent
Seoul	Mapo–Yongsan	Park Gyeong-won	DRP	DRP
Seoul	Mapo–Yongsan	No Seung-hwan	NDP	NDP
Seoul	Yeongdeungpo	Park Han-sang	NDP	NDP
Seoul	Yeongdeungpo	Gang Byeong-gyu	DRP	DRP
Seoul	Gwanak	Kim Su-han (Note: Kim Su-han resigned on 27 August 1980.)	NDP	NDP
Seoul	Gwanak	Jeong Hui-seop	DRP	DRP
Seoul	Gangnam	Jeong Un-gap	NDP	NDP
Seoul	Gangnam	Lee Tae-seop	DRP	DRP
Seoul	Gangseo	Nam Jae-hui	DRP	DRP
Seoul	Gangseo	Kim Yeong-bae	NDP	NDP
Busan	Jung–Yeongdo	Ye Chun-ho (Note: Ye Chun-ho resigned on 4 July 1980.)	Independent	NDP
Busan	Jung–Yeongdo	Kim Sang-jin	NDP	NDP
Busan	Seo–Dong	Kim Young-sam (Note: Kim Young-sam was removed on 4 October 1979.)	NDP	NDP
Busan	Seo–Dong	Park Chan-jong	DRP	Independent
Busan	Busanjin–Buk	Jeong Hae-yeong (Note: Jeong Hae-yeong resigned on 27 August 1980.)	NDP	NDP
Busan	Busanjin–Buk	Kim Im-sik	DRP	DRP
Busan	Dongnae	Lee Gi-taek	NDP	NDP
Busan	Dongnae	Yang Chan-u	DRP	DRP
Busan	Nam	Kim Seung-mok	NDP	NDP
Busan	Nam	Kim Jae-hong	DRP	DRP
Gyeonggi Province	Incheon	Kim Eun-ha	NDP	NDP
Gyeonggi Province	Incheon	Ryu Seung-won	DRP	DRP
Gyeonggi Province	Suwon–Hwaseong	Lee Byeong-hui (Note: Lee Byeong-hui resigned on 4 July 1980.)	DRP	DRP
Gyeonggi Province	Suwon–Hwaseong	Yu Yong-geun	NDP	NDP
Gyeonggi Province	Uijeongbu–Yangju–Paju	Park Myeong-geun	DRP	DRP
Gyeonggi Province	Uijeongbu–Yangju–Paju	Kim Hyeong-gwang	NDP	NDP
Gyeonggi Province	Seongnam–Gwangju–Yeoju–Icheon	Jeong Dong-seong	DRP	DRP
Gyeonggi Province	Seongnam–Gwangju–Yeoju–Icheon	O Se-eung	Independent	NDP
Gyeonggi Province	Pyeongtaek–Yongin–Anseong	Yu Chi-song	NDP	NDP
Gyeonggi Province	Pyeongtaek–Yongin–Anseong	Seo Sang-rin	DRP	DRP
Gyeonggi Province	Bucheon–Anyang–Siheung–Ongjin	Lee Taek-don (Note: Lee Taek-don resigned on 4 July 1980.)	NDP	NDP
Gyeonggi Province	Bucheon–Anyang–Siheung–Ongjin	Yun Guk-no	DRP	DRP
Gyeonggi Province	Goyang–Gimpo–Ganghwa	O Hong-seok	NDP	NDP
Gyeonggi Province	Goyang–Gimpo–Ganghwa	Kim Yu-tak	DRP	DRP
Gyeonggi Province	Yeoncheon–Pocheon–Gapyeong–Yangpyeong	O Chi-seong	DRP	DRP
Gyeonggi Province	Yeoncheon–Pocheon–Gapyeong–Yangpyeong	Cheon Myeong-gi	NDP	NDP
Gangwon Province	Chuncheon–Chunseong–Cheolwon–Hwacheon–Yanggu	Son Seung-deok	DRP	DRP
Gangwon Province	Chuncheon–Chunseong–Cheolwon–Hwacheon–Yanggu	Kim Jun-seop	NDP	NDP
Gangwon Province	Wonju–Wonseong–Hongcheon–Hoengseong	Park Yeong-rok (Note: Park Yeong-rok resigned on 27 August 1980.)	NDP	NDP
Gangwon Province	Wonju–Wonseong–Hongcheon–Hoengseong	Kim Yong-ho	DRP	DRP
Gangwon Province	Gangneung–Myeongju–Samcheok	Kim Hyo-yeong	DRP	DRP
Gangwon Province	Gangneung–Myeongju–Samcheok	Kim Jin-man (Note: Kim Jin-man resigned on 4 July 1980.)	Independent	Independent
Gangwon Province	Sokcho–Yangyang–Inje–Goseong	Jeong Il-gwon	DRP	DRP
Gangwon Province	Sokcho–Yangyang–Inje–Goseong	Ham Jong-bin	Independent	DRP
Gangwon Province	Yeongwol–Pyeongchang–Jeongseon	Jang Seung-tae	DRP	DRP
Gangwon Province	Yeongwol–Pyeongchang–Jeongseon	Eom Yeong-dal	NDP	NDP
North Chungcheong Province	Cheongju–Cheongwon	Kim Hyeon-su	DUP	DUP
North Chungcheong Province	Cheongju–Cheongwon	Lee Min-u	NDP	NDP
North Chungcheong Province	Chungju–Jungwon–Jecheon–Danyang	Lee Jong-geun	DRP	DRP
North Chungcheong Province	Chungju–Jungwon–Jecheon–Danyang	Lee Taek-hui	NDP	NDP
North Chungcheong Province	Boeun–Okcheon–Yeongdong	Yuk In-su	DRP	DRP
North Chungcheong Province	Boeun–Okcheon–Yeongdong	Lee Yong-hui	NDP	NDP
North Chungcheong Province	Jincheon–Gwisan–Eumseong	O Yong-un	DRP	DRP
North Chungcheong Province	Jincheon–Gwisan–Eumseong	Lee Chung-hwan	NDP	NDP
South Chungcheong Province	Dong–Jung, Daejeon	Im Ho	Independent	Independent
South Chungcheong Province	Dong–Jung, Daejeon	Kim Yong-tae (Note: Kim Yong-tae resigned on 27 August 1980.)	DRP	DRP
South Chungcheong Province	Cheonan–Cheonwon–Asan	Kim Jong-cheol	DRP	DRP
South Chungcheong Province	Cheonan–Cheonwon–Asan	Jeong Jae-won	NDP	NDP
South Chungcheong Province	Geumsan–Daedeok–Yeongi	Lee Jun-seop	DRP	DRP
South Chungcheong Province	Geumsan–Daedeok–Yeongi	Yu Han-yeol	NDP	NDP
South Chungcheong Province	Nonsan–Gongju	Jeong Seok-mo	DRP	DRP
South Chungcheong Province	Nonsan–Gongju	Park Chan	Independent	NDP
South Chungcheong Province	Buyeo–Seocheon–Boryeong	Kim Jong-pil (Note: Kim Jong-pil resigned on 4 July 1980.)	DRP	DRP
South Chungcheong Province	Buyeo–Seocheon–Boryeong	Jo Jung-yeon	NDP	NDP
South Chungcheong Province	Cheongyang–Hongseong–Yesan	Jang Yeong-sun (Note: Jang Yeong-sun resigned on 27 August 1980.)	DRP	DRP
South Chungcheong Province	Cheongyang–Hongseong–Yesan	Han Geon-su	NDP	NDP
South Chungcheong Province	Seosan–Dangjin	Sim Hyeon-jik	DRP	DRP
South Chungcheong Province	Seosan–Dangjin	Han Yeong-su	NDP	NDP
North Jeolla Province	Jeonju–Wanju	Lee Cheol-seung (Note: Lee Cheol-seung resigned on 4 July 1980.)	NDP	NDP
North Jeolla Province	Jeonju–Wanju	Yu Gi-jeong (Note: Yu Gi-jeong resigned on 4 October 1980.)	DRP	DRP
North Jeolla Province	Gunsan–Okgu–Iri–Iksan	Kim Hyeon-gi	NDP	NDP
North Jeolla Province	Gunsan–Okgu–Iri–Iksan	Chae Yeong-cheol	DRP	DRP
North Jeolla Province	Jinan–Muju–Jangsu	Kim Gwang-su	DRP	DRP
North Jeolla Province	Jinan–Muju–Jangsu	Choi Seong-seok	NDP	NDP
North Jeolla Province	Imsil–Namwon–Sunchang	Seol In-su	DRP	DRP
North Jeolla Province	Imsil–Namwon–Sunchang	Son Ju-hang (Note: Son Ju-hang resigned on 4 July 1980.)	Independent	NDP
North Jeolla Province	Jeongeup–Gimje	Jang Gyeong-sun	DRP	DRP
North Jeolla Province	Jeongeup–Gimje	Kim Won-gi	NDP	NDP
North Jeolla Province	Gochang–Buan	Park Yong-gi	Independent	DRP
North Jeolla Province	Gochang–Buan	Lee Ho-jong	DRP	DRP
South Jeolla Province	Dong–Seo, Gwangju	Lee Pil-seon	NDP	NDP
South Jeolla Province	Dong–Seo, Gwangju	Kim Nok-yeong (Note: Kim Nok-yeong resigned on 4 July 1980.)	DUP	DUP
South Jeolla Province	Mokpo–Muan–Sinan	Choi Yeong-cheol	DRP	DRP
South Jeolla Province	Mokpo–Muan–Sinan	Im Jeong-gi	NDP	NDP
South Jeolla Province	Yeosu–Yeocheon–Gwangyang	Lee Do-seon	DRP	DRP
South Jeolla Province	Yeosu–Yeocheon–Gwangyang	Park Byeong-hyo	NDP	NDP
South Jeolla Province	Suncheon–Gurye–Seungju	Ryu Gyeong-hyeon	DRP	DRP
South Jeolla Province	Suncheon–Gurye–Seungju	Heo Gyeong-man	NDP	NDP
South Jeolla Province	Naju–Gwangsan	Kim Yun-deok	NDP	NDP
South Jeolla Province	Naju–Gwangsan	Han Gap-su	Independent	DRP
South Jeolla Province	Damyang–Gokseong–Hwasun	Mun Hyeong-tae	DRP	DRP
South Jeolla Province	Damyang–Gokseong–Hwasun	Go Jae-cheong	NDP	NDP
South Jeolla Province	Goheung–Boseong	Sin Hyeong-sik (Note: Sin Hyeong-sik resigned on 27 August 1980.)	DRP	DRP
South Jeolla Province	Goheung–Boseong	Kim Su	Independent	DRP
South Jeolla Province	Jangheung–Gangjin–Yeongam–Wando	Gil Jeon-sik (Note: Gil Jeon-sik resigned on 27 August 1980.)	DRP	DRP
South Jeolla Province	Jangheung–Gangjin–Yeongam–Wando	Yun Jae-myeong	Independent	DRP
South Jeolla Province	Haenam–Jindo	Kim Bong-ho	DRP	DRP
South Jeolla Province	Haenam–Jindo	Im Yeong-deuk	Independent	DRP
South Jeolla Province	Yeonggwang–Hampyeong–Jangseong	Kim Jae-sik	DRP	DRP
South Jeolla Province	Yeonggwang–Hampyeong–Jangseong	Lee Jin-yeon	NDP	NDP
North Gyeongsang Province	Jung–Seo–Buk, Daegu	Han Byeong-chae	Independent	NDP
North Gyeongsang Province	Jung–Seo–Buk, Daegu	Lee Man-seop	DRP	DRP
North Gyeongsang Province	Dong–Nam, Daegu	Lee Hyo-sang	DRP	DRP
North Gyeongsang Province	Dong–Nam, Daegu	Sin Do-hwan	NDP	NDP
North Gyeongsang Province	Pohang–Yeongil–Ulleung–Yeongcheon	Gwon O-tae	Independent	DRP
North Gyeongsang Province	Pohang–Yeongil–Ulleung–Yeongcheon	Jo Gyu-chang	NDP	NDP
North Gyeongsang Province	Gyeongju–Wolseong–Cheongdo	Park Suk-hyeon	DRP	DRP
North Gyeongsang Province	Gyeongju–Wolseong–Cheongdo	Park Gwon-heum	NDP	NDP
North Gyeongsang Province	Gimcheon–Geumneung–Sangju	Park Jeong-su	Independent	DRP
North Gyeongsang Province	Gimcheon–Geumneung–Sangju	Jeong Hwi-dong	Independent	DRP
North Gyeongsang Province	Andong City–Andong County–Uiseong	Kim Sang-nyeon	DRP	DRP
North Gyeongsang Province	Andong City–Andong County–Uiseong	Park Hae-chung (Note: Park Hae-chung resigned on 27 August 1980.)	NDP	NDP
North Gyeongsang Province	Gumi–Gunwi–Seongju–Seonsan–Chilgok	Shin Hyun-hwak (Note: Shin Hyun-hwak resigned on 12 December 1979, upon being appointed as Prime Minister of South Korea.)	DRP	DRP
North Gyeongsang Province	Gumi–Gunwi–Seongju–Seonsan–Chilgok	Kim Hyeon-gyu	Independent	NDP
North Gyeongsang Province	Dalseong–Gyeongsan–Goryeong	Park Jun-gyu	DRP	DRP
North Gyeongsang Province	Dalseong–Gyeongsan–Goryeong	Kim Jong-gi	NDP	NDP
North Gyeongsang Province	Yeongdeok–Cheongsong–Uljin	Mun Tae-jun	DRP	DRP
North Gyeongsang Province	Yeongdeok–Cheongsong–Uljin	Hwang Byeong-u	NDP	NDP
North Gyeongsang Province	Yeongyang–Yeongju–Bonghwa	Kim Chang-geun	DRP	DRP
North Gyeongsang Province	Yeongyang–Yeongju–Bonghwa	Park Yong-man	NDP	NDP
North Gyeongsang Province	Mungyeong–Yecheon	Chae Mun-sik	NDP	NDP
North Gyeongsang Province	Mungyeong–Yecheon	Gu Beom-mo	DRP	DRP
South Gyeongsang Province	Masan–Jinhae–Changwon	Park Jong-gyu (Note: Park Jong-gyu resigned on 4 July 1980.)	DRP	Independent
South Gyeongsang Province	Masan–Jinhae–Changwon	Hwang Nak-ju	NDP	NDP
South Gyeongsang Province	Jinju–Samcheonpo–Jinyang–Sacheon	Gu Tae-hoe (Note: Gu Tae-hoe resigned on 27 August 1980.)	DRP	DRP
South Gyeongsang Province	Jinju–Samcheonpo–Jinyang–Sacheon	Lee Sang-min	Independent	NDP
South Gyeongsang Province	Chungmu–Tongyeong–Geoje–Goseong	Choi Jae-gu	DRP	DRP
South Gyeongsang Province	Chungmu–Tongyeong–Geoje–Goseong	Kim Dong-uk	NDP	NDP
South Gyeongsang Province	Ulsan–Ulju	Lee Hu-rak (Note: Lee Hu-rak resigned on 4 July 1980.)	Independent	Independent
South Gyeongsang Province	Ulsan–Ulju	Choi Hyeong-u (Note: Choi Hyeong-u resigned on 27 August 1980.)	NDP	NDP
South Gyeongsang Province	Uiryeong–Haman–Hapcheon	Kim Sang-seok	DRP	DRP
South Gyeongsang Province	Uiryeong–Haman–Hapcheon	Lee Sang-sin	NDP	NDP
South Gyeongsang Province	Milyang–Changnyeong	Park Il	NDP	NDP
South Gyeongsang Province	Milyang–Changnyeong	Ha Dae-don	DRP	DRP
South Gyeongsang Province	Yangsan–Gimhae	Kim Taek-su	DRP	DRP
South Gyeongsang Province	Yangsan–Gimhae	Sin Sang-u	NDP	NDP
South Gyeongsang Province	Namhae–Hadong	Sin Dong-gwan	DRP	DRP
South Gyeongsang Province	Namhae–Hadong	Choi Chi-hwan	Independent	DRP
South Gyeongsang Province	Sancheong–Hamyang–Geochang	No In-hwan	DRP	DRP
South Gyeongsang Province	Sancheong–Hamyang–Geochang	Kim Dong-yeong (Note: Kim Dong-yeong resigned on 27 August 1980.)	NDP	NDP
Jeju Province	Jeju–Bukjeju–Namjeju	Hyeon O-bong (Note: Hyeon O-bong resigned on 27 August 1980.)	DRP	DRP
Jeju Province	Jeju–Bukjeju–Namjeju	Byeon Jeong-il	Independent	DRP
Presidential appointees		Gal Bong-geun	Yushin	Yushin
Presidential appointees		Go Jae-pil	Yushin	Yushin
Presidential appointees		Kim Bong-gi	Yushin	Yushin
Presidential appointees		Kim Seong-hwan (Note: Kim Seong-hwan died on 8 October 1979.)	Yushin	Yushin
Presidential appointees		Kim Se-bae	Yushin	Yushin
Presidential appointees		Kim Yeong-gwang	Yushin	Yushin
Presidential appointees		Kim Yeong-su	Yushin	Yushin
Presidential appointees		Kim Yeong-ja	Yushin	Yushin
Presidential appointees		Kim Ok-yeol	Yushin	Yushin
Presidential appointees		Kim Yong-ho	Yushin	Yushin
Presidential appointees		Kim Yun-hwan	Yushin	Yushin
Presidential appointees		Kim Jong-ha	Yushin	Yushin
Presidential appointees		Kim Ju-in	Yushin	Yushin
Presidential appointees		Park Dong-ang	Yushin	Yushin
Presidential appointees		Park Jun-gyu	Yushin	Yushin
Presidential appointees		Park Hyeon-seo	Yushin	Yushin
Presidential appointees		Park Hyeong-gyu	Yushin	Yushin
Presidential appointees		Paik Too-chin	Yushin	Yushin
Presidential appointees		Baek Yeong-hun	Yushin	Yushin
Presidential appointees		Byeon U-ryang	Yushin	Yushin
Presidential appointees		Seo Yeong-hui	Yushin	Yushin
Presidential appointees		Seon U-ryeon	Yushin	Yushin
Presidential appointees		Song Bang-yong	Yushin	Yushin
Presidential appointees		Sin Gwang-sun	Yushin	Yushin
Presidential appointees		Sin Dong-sun	Yushin	Yushin
Presidential appointees		Sin Beom-sik	Yushin	Yushin
Presidential appointees		Sin Sang-cheol	Yushin	Yushin
Presidential appointees		Sin Sang-cho	Yushin	Yushin
Presidential appointees		Sin Cheol-gyun	Yushin	Yushin
Presidential appointees		Sim Yong-taek	Yushin	Yushin
Presidential appointees		An Gap-jun	Yushin	Yushin
Presidential appointees		O Jun-seok	Yushin	Yushin
Presidential appointees		Yun Sik	Yushin	Yushin
Presidential appointees		Yun Yeo-hun	Yushin	Yushin
Presidential appointees		Yun In-sik	Yushin	Yushin
Presidential appointees		Lee Gyeong-ho	Yushin	Yushin
Presidential appointees		Lee Do-hwan	Yushin	Yushin
Presidential appointees		Lee Dong-won	Yushin	Yushin
Presidential appointees		Lee Myeong-chun	Yushin	Yushin
Presidential appointees		Lee Sang-ik	Yushin	Yushin
Presidential appointees		Lee Seok-je	Yushin	Yushin
Presidential appointees		Lee Sang-geun	Yushin	Yushin
Presidential appointees		Lee Seung-yun (Note: Lee Seung-yun resigned on 22 May 1980, upon being appointed as Minister of Finance.)	Yushin	Yushin
Presidential appointees		Lee Yang-u	Yushin	Yushin
Presidential appointees		Lee Yeong-geun	Yushin	Yushin
Presidential appointees		Lee Ja-heon	Yushin	Yushin
Presidential appointees		Lee Jeong-seok	Yushin	Yushin
Presidential appointees		Lee Jeong-sik	Yushin	Yushin
Presidential appointees		Lee Jong-ryul	Yushin	Yushin
Presidential appointees		Lee Jong-sik	Yushin	Yushin
Presidential appointees		Lee Jong-chan	Yushin	Yushin
Presidential appointees		Lee Cheol-hui	Yushin	Yushin
Presidential appointees		Lee Hae-won	Yushin	Yushin
Presidential appointees		Jang Gi-seon	Yushin	Yushin
Presidential appointees		Jang Ji-ryang	Yushin	Yushin
Presidential appointees		Jeon Bu-il	Yushin	Yushin
Presidential appointees		Jeon Jeong-gu	Yushin	Yushin
Presidential appointees		Jeong Byeong-hak	Yushin	Yushin
Presidential appointees		Jeong Il-yeong	Yushin	Yushin
Presidential appointees		Jeong Jae-ho	Yushin	Yushin
Presidential appointees		Jeong Hui-chae	Yushin	Yushin
Presidential appointees		Jo Byeong-gyu	Yushin	Yushin
Presidential appointees		Jo Sang-ho	Yushin	Yushin
Presidential appointees		Jo Il-je	Yushin	Yushin
Presidential appointees		Jo Hong-rae	Yushin	Yushin
Presidential appointees		Cheon Byeong-gyu	Yushin	Yushin
Presidential appointees		Choi Gyeong-rok (Note: Choi Gyeong-rok resigned on 13 August 1980, upon being appointed as ambassador of South Korea to Japan.)	Yushin	Yushin
Presidential appointees		Choi Dae-hyeon	Yushin	Yushin
Presidential appointees		Choi Yeong-hui	Yushin	Yushin
Presidential appointees		Choi U-geun	Yushin	Yushin
Presidential appointees		Choi Tae-ho (Note: Choi Tae-ho resigned on 27 August 1980.)	Yushin	Yushin
Presidential appointees		Tae Wan-seon	Yushin	Yushin
Presidential appointees		Han Gi-chun	Yushin	Yushin
Presidential appointees		Han Ok-sin	Yushin	Yushin
Presidential appointees		Han Tae-yeon	Yushin	Yushin
Presidential appointees		Ham Myeong-su	Yushin	Yushin
Presidential appointees		Hyeon Gi-sun	Yushin	Yushin
Presidential appointees		Ko Gwi-nam (Note: Ko Gwi-nam took office on 8 October 1979, to succeed Kim Seong-hwan.)	Yushin	Yushin
Presidential appointees		Nam Jae-han (Note: Nam Jae-han took office on 22 May 1980, to succeed Lee Seung-yun.)	Yushin	Yushin
Presidential appointees		Lee Ho-dong (Note: Lee Ho-dong took office on 13 August 1980, to succeed Choi Gyeong-rok.)	Yushin	Yushin
Presidential appointees		Kim Yu-bok (Note: Kim Yu-bok took office on 27 August 1980, to succeed Choi Tae-ho.)	Yushin	Yushin

== See also ==
- 1978 South Korean legislative election
- National Assembly (South Korea)#History
