= List of members of the National Assembly (South Korea), 1967–1971 =

The members of the seventh National Assembly of South Korea were elected on 8 June 1967. The assembly sat from 1 July 1967 until 30 June 1971.

== Members ==
Province/City	Constituency	Member	Party	
Province/City	Constituency	Member	At election	At term's end
Seoul	Jongno	Yu Jin-o	NDP	NDP
Seoul	Jung	Jeong Il-hyeong	NDP	NDP
Seoul	Dongdaemun A	Song Won-yeong	NDP	NDP
Seoul	Dongdaemun B	Jang Jun-ha	NDP	Independent
Seoul	Seongdong A	Jo Han-baek (Note: Jo Han-baek was removed on 11 January 1971.)	NDP	NDP
Seoul	Seongdong B	Park Jun-gyu	DRP	DRP
Seoul	Seongbuk A	Jo Yun-hyeong	NDP	NDP
Seoul	Seongbuk B	Seo Beom-seok	NDP	NDP
Seoul	Seodaemun A	Kim Jae-gwang	NDP	NDP
Seoul	Seodaemun B	Yun Je-sul	NDP	NDP
Seoul	Mapo	Kim Hong-il	NDP	NDP
Seoul	Yongsan	Kim Won-man	NDP	NDP
Seoul	Yeongdeungpo A	Yu Chin-san	NDP	NDP
Seoul	Yeongdeungpo B	Park Han-sang	NDP	NDP
Busan	Jung	Kim Eung-ju	NDP	NDP
Busan	Yeongdo	Ye Chun-ho	DRP	DRP
Busan	Seo	Kim Young-sam	NDP	NDP
Busan	Dong	Park Gi-chul (Note: Park Gi-chul was removed on 22 March 1971.)	NDP	NDP
Busan	Busanjin A	Jeong Sang-gu	NDP	NDP
Busan	Busanjin B	Choi Du-go	DRP	DRP
Busan	Dongnae	Im Gap-su	NDP	DRP
Gyeonggi Province	Incheon A	Kim Jeong-yeol	NDP	NDP
Gyeonggi Province	Incheon B	Kim Eun-ha	NDP	NDP
Gyeonggi Province	Suwon	Lee Byeong-hui	DRP	DRP
Gyeonggi Province	Uijeongbu–Yangju	Lee Jin-yong (Note: Lee Jin-yong was removed on 19 March 1971.)	DRP	DRP
Gyeonggi Province	Gwangju–Icheon	Cha Ji-cheol	DRP	DRP
Gyeonggi Province	Pocheon–Gapyeong–Yeoncheon	O Chi-seong	DRP	DRP
Gyeonggi Province	Yeoju–Yangpyeong	Lee Byeong-il	DRP	DRP
Gyeonggi Province	Yongin–Anseong	Seo Sang-rin	DRP	DRP
Gyeonggi Province	Pyeongtaek	Lee Yun-yong	DRP	DRP
Gyeonggi Province	Hwaseong	Kim Hyeong-il	NDP	NDP
Gyeonggi Province	Goyang–Paju	Sin Yun-chang	DRP	DRP
Gyeonggi Province	Gimpo–Ganghwa	Kim Jae-so	DRP	DRP
Gyeonggi Province	Siheung–Bucheon–Ongjin	O Hak-jin	DRP	DRP
Gangwon Province	Chuncheon–Chunseong	Kim U-yeong (Note: Kim U-yeong was removed on 8 March 1971.)	DRP	DRP
Gangwon Province	Wonju–Wonseong	Park Yeong-rok	NDP	NDP
Gangwon Province	Gangneung–Myeongju	Choi Ik-gyu	DRP	DRP
Gangwon Province	Hongcheon–Inje	Lee Seung-chun	DRP	DRP
Gangwon Province	Yeongwol–Jeongseon	Jang Seung-tae	DRP	DRP
Gangwon Province	Cheolwon–Hwacheon–Yanggu	Kim Jae-sun	DRP	DRP
Gangwon Province	Sokcho–Yangyang–Goseong	Kim Jong-ho	DRP	DRP
Gangwon Province	Hoeseong–Pyeongchang	Lee U-hyeon	DRP	DRP
Gangwon Province	Samcheok	Kim Jin-man	DRP	DRP
North Chungcheong Province	Cheongju	Jeong Tae-seong	DRP	DRP
North Chungcheong Province	Cheongwon	Min Gi-sik	DRP	DRP
North Chungcheong Province	Chungju–Jungwon	Lee Jong-geun	DRP	DRP
North Chungcheong Province	Okcheon–Boeun	Yuk In-su	DRP	DRP
North Chungcheong Province	Gwisan	An Dong-jun (Note: An Dong-jun resigned on 16 June 1971.)	DRP	DRP
North Chungcheong Province	Yeongdong	Jeong Jik-rae	DRP	DRP
North Chungcheong Province	Jincheon–Eumseong	O Won-seon	DRP	DRP
North Chungcheong Province	Jecheon–Danyang	Kim Yu-taek	DRP	DRP
South Chungcheong Province	Daejeon	Park Byeong-bae	NDP	NDP
South Chungcheong Province	Daedeok–Yeongi	Kim Yong-tae	DRP	DRP
South Chungcheong Province	Gongju	Kim Dal-su	DRP	Independent
South Chungcheong Province	Nonsan	Yang Sun-jik	DRP	DRP
South Chungcheong Province	Buyeo	Kim Jong-pil (Note: Kim Jong-pil resigned on 2 June 1968.)	DRP	DRP
South Chungcheong Province	Buyeo	Kim Jong-ik (Note: Kim Jong-ik was by-elected on 24 September 1968, to succeed Kim Jong-pil.)	DRP	DRP
South Chungcheong Province	Seocheon–Boryeong	Lee Won-jang (Note: Lee Won-jang was removed on 3 June 1968, after his election was invalidated.)	DRP	Independent
South Chungcheong Province	Seocheon–Boryeong	Kim Ok-seon (Note: Kim Ok-seon was declared elected on 3 June 1968, after Lee Won-jang's election was invalidated.)	NDP	NDP
South Chungcheong Province	Cheongyang–Hongseong	Jang Yeong-sun	DRP	DRP
South Chungcheong Province	Yesan	Park Byeong-seon (Note: Park Byeong-seon was removed on 24 December 1970, after his election was invalidated.)	DRP	Independent
South Chungcheong Province	Seosan	Lee Sang-hui	DRP	DRP
South Chungcheong Province	Dangjin	Kim Du-hyeon	DRP	DRP
South Chungcheong Province	Asan	Lee Min-u	DRP	DRP
South Chungcheong Province	Cheonan–Cheonwon	Kim Jong-cheol	DRP	DRP
South Chungcheong Province	Geumsan	Gil Jae-ho	DRP	DRP
North Jeolla Province	Jeonju	Kim Yong-jin	DRP	DRP
North Jeolla Province	Gunsan–Okgu	Cha Hyeong-geun	DRP	DRP
North Jeolla Province	Iri–Iksan	Kim Seong-cheol	DRP	DRP
North Jeolla Province	Wanju	Ryu Beom-su	DRP	DRP
North Jeolla Province	Jinan–Jangsu–Muju	Jeon Hyu-sang	DRP	DRP
North Jeolla Province	Imsil–Sunchang	Han Sang-jun	DRP	DRP
North Jeolla Province	Namwon	Ryu Gwang-hyeon	DRP	DRP
North Jeolla Province	Jeongeup	Park Du-seon	DRP	DRP
North Jeolla Province	Gochang	Sin Yong-nam (Note: Sin Yong-nam resigned on 4 July 1967, but returned by being by-elected on 24 September 1968.)	DRP (Note: Sin Yong-nam was an independent when he resigned. He was by-elected as a member of the Mass Party, but was affiliated with the Democratic Republican Party at the end of his term.)	DRP
North Jeolla Province	Buan	Lee Byeong-ok	DRP	DRP
North Jeolla Province	Gimje	Jang Gyeong-sun	DRP	DRP
South Jeolla Province	Gwangju A	Jeong Seong-tae	NDP	NDP
South Jeolla Province	Gwangju B	Jeong Rae-jeong	DRP	DRP
South Jeolla Province	Mokpo	Kim Dae-jung	NDP	NDP
South Jeolla Province	Yeosu–Yeocheon	Lee U-heon (Note: Lee U-heon was removed on 20 April 1971.)	DRP	DRP
South Jeolla Province	Suncheon–Seungju	Kim U-gyeong	DRP	DRP
South Jeolla Province	Damyang–Jangseong	Go Jae-pil	DRP	DRP
South Jeolla Province	Hwasun–Gokseong	Gi Se-pung (Note: Gi Se-pung resigned on 5 July 1967.)	DRP	Independent
South Jeolla Province	Hwasun–Gokseong	Yang Hoe-su (Note: Yang Hoe-su was by-elected on 24 September 1968, to succeed Gi Se-pung.)	NDP	NDP
South Jeolla Province	Gurye–Gwangyang	Lee Hyeon-jae (Note: Lee Hyeon-jae was removed on 3 May 1971.)	DRP	DRP
South Jeolla Province	Goheung	Seo Min-ho	Mass	NDP
South Jeolla Province	Boseong	Yang Dal-seung (Note: Yang Dal-seung was removed on 25 July 1969, after his election was invalidated.)	DRP	Independent
South Jeolla Province	Boseong	Lee Jung-jae (Note: Lee Jung-jae was by-elected on 14 August 1969, to succeed Yang Dal-seung.)	NDP	NDP
South Jeolla Province	Jangheung	Gil Jeon-sik	DRP	DRP
South Jeolla Province	Yeongam–Gangjin	Yun Jae-myeong	DRP	DRP
South Jeolla Province	Wando	Jeong Gan-yong	DRP	DRP
South Jeolla Province	Haenam	Kim Byeong-sun	DRP	DRP
South Jeolla Province	Muan	Bae Gil-do	DRP	DRP
South Jeolla Province	Naju	Lee Ho-beom (Note: Lee Ho-beom resigned on 11 December 1968, but returned by being by-elected on 28 February 1969.)	DRP (Note: Lee Ho-beom was an independent when he resigned. He was by-elected as a member of the Democratic Republican Party.)	DRP
South Jeolla Province	Gwangsan	Park Jong-tae (Note: Park Jong-tae was removed on 23 February 1971.)	DRP	DRP
South Jeolla Province	Yeonggwang–Hampyeong	Yun In-sik	DRP	DRP
South Jeolla Province	Jindo	Lee Nam-jun	DRP	DRP
North Gyeongsang Province	Jung, Daegu	Lee Man-seop	DRP	DRP
North Gyeongsang Province	Dong, Daegu	Lee Won-man	DRP	DRP
North Gyeongsang Province	Nam, Daegu	Lee Hyo-sang	DRP	DRP
North Gyeongsang Province	Buk–Seo, Daegu	Jo Il-hwan	NDP	NDP
North Gyeongsang Province	Pohang–Yeongil–Ulleung	Kim Jang-seop	DRP	DRP
North Gyeongsang Province	Gimcheon–Geumneung	Baek Nam-eok	DRP	DRP
North Gyeongsang Province	Gyeongju–Wolseong	Lee Sang-mu	DRP	DRP
North Gyeongsang Province	Dalseong–Goryeong	Kim Seong-gon	DRP	DRP
North Gyeongsang Province	Gunwi–Seonsan	Kim Bong-hwan	DRP	DRP
North Gyeongsang Province	Uiseong	U Hong-gu	NDP	NDP
North Gyeongsang Province	Andong City–Andong County	Kim Dae-jin	DRP	DRP
North Gyeongsang Province	Cheongsong–Yeongdeok	Mun Tae-jun	DRP	DRP
North Gyeongsang Province	Yeongyang–Uljin	O Jun-seok	DRP	DRP
North Gyeongsang Province	Yeongcheon	Lee Won-u	DRP	DRP
North Gyeongsang Province	Gyeongsan–Cheongdo	Park Ju-hyeon	DRP	DRP
North Gyeongsang Province	Seongju–Chilgok	Song Han-cheol	DRP	DRP
North Gyeongsang Province	Sangju	Kim Cheon-su	DRP	DRP
North Gyeongsang Province	Mungyeong	Lee Dong-yeong	DRP	DRP
North Gyeongsang Province	Yecheon	Jeong Jin-dong	DRP	DRP
North Gyeongsang Province	Yeongju–Bonghwa	Kim Chang-geun	DRP	DRP
South Gyeongsang Province	Masan	Han Tae-il (Note: Han Tae-il was removed on 4 May 1971.)	DRP	DRP
South Gyeongsang Province	Jinju–Jinyang	Gu Tae-hoe	DRP	DRP
South Gyeongsang Province	Chungmu–Tongyeong–Goseong	Choi Seok-rim (Note: Choi Seok-rim was removed on 1 May 1970, after his election was invalidated. He returned by being by-elected on 22 May 1970, but was removed on 24 February 1971.)	DRP (Note: Choi Seok-rim was an independent when he resigned. He was by-elected as a member of the Democratic Republican Party.)	DRP
South Gyeongsang Province	Geoje	Kim Ju-in	DRP	DRP
South Gyeongsang Province	Jinhae–Changwon	Jo Chang-dae (Note: Jo Chang-dae died on 22 August 1969.)	DRP	DRP
South Gyeongsang Province	Samcheonpo–Seocheon–Hadong	Kim Yong-sun	DRP	DRP
South Gyeongsang Province	Haman–Uiryeong	Kim Chang-uk	DRP	DRP
South Gyeongsang Province	Changnyeong	Seong Nak-hyeon (Note: Seong Nak-hyeon resigned on 7 September 1969, but returned by being by-elected on 5 December 1969.)	NDP (Note: Seong Nak-hyeon was by-elected as a member of the Democratic Republican Party.)	DRP
South Gyeongsang Province	Sancheong–Hapcheon	Kim Sam-sang	DRP	DRP
South Gyeongsang Province	Milyang	Gong Jeong-sik	DRP	DRP
South Gyeongsang Province	Yangsan–Dongnae	No Jae-pil	DRP	DRP
South Gyeongsang Province	Ulsan–Ulju	Seol Du-ha	DRP	DRP
South Gyeongsang Province	Gimhae	Kim Taek-su	DRP	DRP
South Gyeongsang Province	Namhae	Choi Chi-hwan	DRP	DRP
South Gyeongsang Province	Hamyang–Geochang	Min Byeong-gwon	DRP	DRP
Jeju Province	Jeju–Bukjeju	Yang Jeong-gyu	DRP	DRP
Jeju Province	Namjeju	Hyeon O-bong	DRP	DRP
National	Proportional representation	Jeong Gu-yeong	DRP	DRP
National	Proportional representation	Yun Chi-yeong	DRP	DRP
National	Proportional representation	Paik Too-chin	DRP	DRP
National	Proportional representation	Choi Hui-song	DRP	DRP
National	Proportional representation	Kim Jeong-ryeol	DRP	DRP
National	Proportional representation	Yun Cheon-ju	DRP	DRP
National	Proportional representation	Yang Chan-u	DRP	DRP
National	Proportional representation	Lee Dong-won	DRP	DRP
National	Proportional representation	Kim Dong-hwan	DRP	DRP
National	Proportional representation	Choi Yeong-hui (Note: Choi Yeong-hui resigned on 27 February 1968, upon being appointed as Ministry of National Defense.)	DRP	DRP
National	Proportional representation	Lee Yeong-geun	DRP	DRP
National	Proportional representation	Kim Seong-hui	DRP	DRP
National	Proportional representation	Lee Won-yeop	DRP	DRP
National	Proportional representation	Kim Yu-tak	DRP	DRP
National	Proportional representation	Park No-seon	DRP	DRP
National	Proportional representation	Kim Yong-ho	DRP	DRP
National	Proportional representation	Kim Yeong-bok	DRP	DRP
National	Proportional representation	Lee Jeong-seok	DRP	DRP
National	Proportional representation	Sin Dong-uk	DRP	DRP
National	Proportional representation	Kim Gyu-nam (Note: Kim Gyu-nam resigned on 14 May 1969.)	DRP	DRP
National	Proportional representation	Lee Byeong-ju	DRP	DRP
National	Proportional representation	Lee Mae-ri	DRP	DRP
National	Proportional representation	Lee Seong-su	DRP	DRP
National	Proportional representation	Sin Dong-jun	DRP	DRP
National	Proportional representation	Kim Ik-jun	DRP	DRP
National	Proportional representation	Lee Won-yeong	DRP	DRP
National	Proportional representation	Lee Yeong-ho	DRP	DRP
National	Proportional representation	Hyeon Jeong-ju (Note: Hyeon Jeong-ju took office on 27 February 1968, to succeed Choi Yeong-hui, but died on 11 June 1970.)	DRP	DRP
National	Proportional representation	Kim Yong-chae (Note: Kim Yong-chae took office on 14 May 1969, to succeed Kim Gyu-nam.)	DRP	DRP
National	Proportional representation	Park Sun-cheon	DRP	DRP
National	Proportional representation	Kim Do-yeon (Note: Kim Do-yeon died on 19 July 1967.)	DRP	DRP
National	Proportional representation	Jeong Hae-yeong	DRP	DRP
National	Proportional representation	Ko Heung-mun	DRP	DRP
National	Proportional representation	Lee Jae-hyeong (Note: Lee Jae-hyeong resigned on 8 February 1971.)	DRP	DRP
National	Proportional representation	Kim Se-yeong (Note: Kim Se-yeong resigned on 29 June 1970.)	DRP	DRP
National	Proportional representation	Jeong Un-gap	DRP	DRP
National	Proportional representation	Han Tong-suk	DRP	Independent
National	Proportional representation	Kim Seong-yong	DRP	DRP
National	Proportional representation	Yeon Ju-heum (Note: Yeon Ju-heum resigned on 7 September 1969.)	DRP	DRP
National	Proportional representation	Pyeon Yong-ho	DRP	DRP
National	Proportional representation	Park Jae-u	DRP	USP
National	Proportional representation	Lee Gi-taek	DRP	DRP
National	Proportional representation	Lee Min-u	DRP	DRP
National	Proportional representation	Kim Su-han	DRP	DRP
National	Proportional representation	Kim Sang-hyeon	DRP	DRP
National	Proportional representation	Jo Heung-man (Note: Jo Heung-man resigned on 7 September 1969.)	DRP	DRP
National	Proportional representation	Kim Hyeon-gi (Note: Kim Hyeon-gi took office on 19 July 1967, to succeed Kim Do-yeon.)	DRP	DRP

== See also ==
- 1967 South Korean legislative election
- National Assembly (South Korea)#History
