= Kwak Sang-hoon =

South Korean politician (1896–1980)

Samyeon Kwak
- 삼연 곽상훈
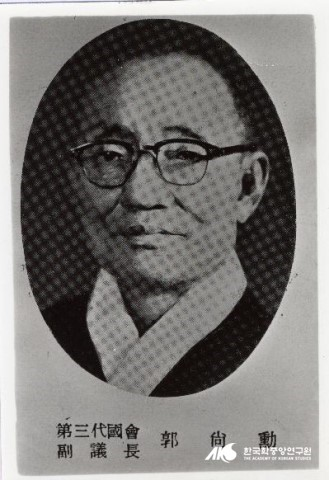

Acting President of South Korea
- In office June 16, 1960 – June 22, 1960
- Prime Minister: Ho Chong
- Preceded by: Ho Chong (acting)
- Succeeded by: Ho Chong (acting)

4th Speaker of the National Assembly
- In office 2 May 1960 – 17 May 1961
- Deputy: Lim Cheol-ho; Kim Do-yeon; Lee Jae-hyeong; Lee Yeong-jun
- Preceded by: Lee Ki-poong
- Succeeded by: Rhee Hyo-sang (1963)

9th Deputy Speaker of the National Assembly
- In office June 9, 1954 – June 8, 1956
- Speaker: Lee Ki-poong
- Preceded by: Choe Sun-ju
- Succeeded by: Jo Gyeong-gyu

Personal details
- Born: 21 October 1896
- Died: 19 January 1980 (aged 83) Seoul, South Korea

Kwak Sang-hoon (Korean: 곽상훈; 21 October 1896 – 19 January 1980) was a South Korean independence activist and politician who served as the 1st to 5th National Assembly member and served as acting president of South Korea for 7 days.

== Early life ==
Kwak Sang-hoon was born on 21 October 1896, in Dongnae-gun in the South Gyeongsang Province as the son of a military officer. His grandfather served as a military officer and served as a lieutenant colonel in Yeoju-gun, and the head of the middle army and the house of the middle army.

== In popular culture ==
Kwak was portrayed by actor Park Woong in the 1981―82 TV series, 1st Republic.
