= List of members of the National Assembly (South Korea), 1971–1972 =

This is a list of members of the 8th National Assembly of South Korea which sat from 26 July 1971 until 17 December 1972.

== Members ==
Province/City	Constituency	Member	Party
Seoul	Jongno	Gwon Jung-don	NDP
Seoul	Jung	Jeong Il-hyeong	NDP
Seoul	Dongdaemun A	Song Won-yeong	NDP
Seoul	Dongdaemun B	Yu Ok-u	NDP
Seoul	Seongdong A	Yang Il-dong	NDP
Seoul	Seongdong B	Hong Yeong-gi	NDP
Seoul	Seongdong C	Jeong Un-gap	NDP
Seoul	Seongbuk A	Jo Yun-hyeong	NDP
Seoul	Seongbuk B	Seo Beom-seok	NDP
Seoul	Seongbuk C	Go Heung-mun	NDP
Seoul	Seodaemun A	Kim Jae-gwang	NDP
Seoul	Seodaemun B	Kim Sang-hyeon	NDP
Seoul	Seodaemun C	Yun Je-sul	NDP
Seoul	Mapo	No Seung-hwan	NDP
Seoul	Yongsan	Kim Won-man	NDP
Seoul	Yeongdeungpo A	Jang Deok-jin	DRP
Seoul	Yeongdeungpo B	Kim Su-han	NDP
Seoul	Yeongdeungpo C	Park Han-sang	NDP
Seoul	Yeongdeungpo D	Yun Gil-jung	NDP
Busan	Jung	Kim Eung-ju	NDP
Busan	Yeongdo	Kim Sang-jin	NDP
Busan	Seo	Kim Young-sam	NDP
Busan	Dong	Kim Seung-mok	NDP
Busan	Busanjin A	Kim Im-sik	DRP
Busan	Busanjin B	Jeong Hae-yeong	NDP
Busan	Dongnae A	Yang Chan-u	DRP
Busan	Dongnae B	Lee Gi-taek	NDP
Gyeonggi Province	Dong–Jung, Incheon	Ryu Seung-won	DRP
Gyeonggi Province	Nam, Incheon	Kim Eun-ha	NDP
Gyeonggi Province	Buk, Incheon	Kim Suk-hyeon	DRP
Gyeonggi Province	Suwon	Lee Byeong-hui	DRP
Gyeonggi Province	Uijeongbu–Yangju	Lee Yun-hak	DRP
Gyeonggi Province	Gwangju–Icheon	Cha Ji-cheol	DRP
Gyeonggi Province	Pocheon–Gapyeong–Yeoncheon	O Chi-seong	DRP
Gyeonggi Province	Yeoju–Yangpyeong	Cheon Myeong-gi	NDP
Gyeonggi Province	Yongin–Anseong	Seo Sang-rin	DRP
Gyeonggi Province	Pyeongtaek	Choi Yeong-hui	DRP
Gyeonggi Province	Hwaseong	Kim Hyeong-il	NDP
Gyeonggi Province	Paju	Park Myeong-geun	DRP
Gyeonggi Province	Goyang	Kim Yu-tak	DRP
Gyeonggi Province	Gimpo–Ganghwa	Kim Jae-chun	People's (Note: Affiliated with the Democratic Republican Party at the end of the member's term.)
Gyeonggi Province	Siheung	Lee Taek-don	NDP
Gyeonggi Province	Pucheon–Ongjin	O Hak-jin	DRP
Gangwon Province	Chuncheon–Chunseong	Hong Chang-seop	NDP
Gangwon Province	Wonju–Wonseong	Kim Yong-ho	DRP
Gangwon Province	Gangneung–Myeongju	Choi Don-ung	DRP
Gangwon Province	Hongcheon–Inje	Lee Gyo-seon	DRP
Gangwon Province	Yeongwol–Jeongseon	Jang Seung-tae	DRP
Gangwon Province	Cheolwon–Hwacheon–Yanggu	Kim Jae-sun	DRP
Gangwon Province	Sokcho–Yangyang–Goseong	Han Byeong-gi	DRP
Gangwon Province	Hoeseong–Pyeongchang	Lee U-Hyeon	DRP
Gangwon Province	Samcheok	Kim Jin-man	DRP
North Chungcheong Province	Cheongju	Choi Byeong-gil	NDP
North Chungcheong Province	Cheongwon	Min Gi-sik	DRP
North Chungcheong Province	Chungju–Jungwon	Lee Taek-hui	NDP
North Chungcheong Province	Okcheon–Boeun	Yuk In-su	DRP
North Chungcheong Province	Gwisan	Kim Won-tae	DRP
North Chungcheong Province	Yeongdong	Jeong Gu-jung	DRP
North Chungcheong Province	Jincheon–Eumseong	Lee Jeong-seok	DRP
North Chungcheong Province	Jecheon–Danyang	Lee Hae-won	DRP
South Chungcheong Province	Daejeon A	Park Byeong-bae	NDP
South Chungcheong Province	Daejeon B	Kim Yong-tae	DRP
South Chungcheong Province	Daedeok–Yeongi	Kim Je-won	DRP
South Chungcheong Province	Gongju	Lee Byeong-ju	DRP
South Chungcheong Province	Nonsan	Kim Han-su	NDP
South Chungcheong Province	Buyeo	Kim Jong-ik	DRP
South Chungcheong Province	Seocheon	Lee Sang-ik	DRP
South Chungcheong Province	Boryeong	Choi Jong-seong	DRP
South Chungcheong Province	Cheongyang–Hongseong	Jang Yeong-sun	DRP
South Chungcheong Province	Yesan	Han Geon-su	NDP
South Chungcheong Province	Seosan	Park Seung-gyu	DRP
South Chungcheong Province	Dangjin	Ryu Je-yeon	NDP
South Chungcheong Province	Asan	Kim Se-bae	DRP
South Chungcheong Province	Cheonan–Cheonwon	Kim Jong-cheol	DRP
South Chungcheong Province	Geumsan	Park Seong-ho	DRP
North Jeolla Province	Jeonju	Lee Cheol-seung	NDP
North Jeolla Province	Gunsan–Okgu	Kang Geun-ho	NDP
North Jeolla Province	Iri–Iksan	Kim Hyeon-gi	NDP
North Jeolla Province	Wanju	Yu Gi-jeong	DRP
North Jeolla Province	Jinan	Jeon Hyu-sang	DRP
North Jeolla Province	Jangsu–Muju	Gil Byeong-jeon	DRP
North Jeolla Province	Imsil–Sunchang	Lee Jeong-u	DRP
North Jeolla Province	Namwon	Yang Hae-jun	NDP
North Jeolla Province	Jeongeup	Ryu Gap-jong	NDP
North Jeolla Province	Gochang	Jin Ui-jong	NDP
North Jeolla Province	Buan	Lee Byeong-ok	DRP
North Jeolla Province	Gimje	Jang Gyeong-sun	DRP
South Jeolla Province	Gwangju A	Jeong Seong-tae	NDP
South Jeolla Province	Gwangju B	Kim Nok-yeong	NDP
South Jeolla Province	Mokpo	Kim Gyeong-in	NDP
South Jeolla Province	Yeosu	Kim Sang-yeong	DRP
South Jeolla Province	Yeocheon	Kim Jung-tae	DRP
South Jeolla Province	Suncheon–Seungju	Jo Yeon-ha	NDP
South Jeolla Province	Damyang–Jangseong	Go Jae-pil	DRP
South Jeolla Province	Hwasun–Gokseong	Mun Hyeong-tae	DRP
South Jeolla Province	Gurye–Gwangyang	Pak Jun-ho	DRP
South Jeolla Province	Goheung	Sin Hyeong-sik	DRP
South Jeolla Province	Boseong	Lee Jung-jae	NDP
South Jeolla Province	Jangheung	Gil Jeon-sik	DRP
South Jeolla Province	Yeongam–Gangjin	Yun Jae-myeong	DRP
South Jeolla Province	Wando	Jeong Gan-yong	DRP
South Jeolla Province	Haenam	Im Chung-sik	DRP
South Jeolla Province	Muan	Im Jong-gi	NDP
South Jeolla Province	Sinan	Jeong Pan-guk	DRP
South Jeolla Province	Naju	Na Seok-ho	NDP
South Jeolla Province	Gwangsan	O Jung-yeol	DRP
South Jeolla Province	Yeonggwang	Park Jong-jin	DRP
South Jeolla Province	Hampyeong	Yun In-sik	DRP
South Jeolla Province	Jindo	Son Jae-hyeong	DRP
North Gyeongsang Province	Jung, Daegu	Han Byeong-chae	NDP
North Gyeongsang Province	Dong, Daegu	Kim Jeong-du	NDP
North Gyeongsang Province	Nam, Daegu	Sin Jin-uk	NDP
North Gyeongsang Province	Seo, Daegu	Jo Il-hwan	NDP
North Gyeongsang Province	Buk, Daegu	Kang Jae-gu	DRP
North Gyeongsang Province	Pohang–Ulleung	Kim Byeong-yun	DRP
North Gyeongsang Province	Yeongil	Jeong Mu-sik	DRP
North Gyeongsang Province	Gimcheon–Geumneung	Baek Nam-eok	DRP
North Gyeongsang Province	Gyeongju–Wolseong	Sim Bong-seop	NDP
North Gyeongsang Province	Dalseong–Goryeong	Kim Seong-gon (Note: Kim Seong-gon resigned on 5 October 1971.)	DRP
North Gyeongsang Province	Dalseong–Goryeong	Park Jun-gyu (Note: Park Jun-gyu was by-elected on 14 December 1971, to succeed Kim Seong-gon.)	DRP
North Gyeongsang Province	Gunwi–Seonsan	Kim Bong-hwan	DRP
North Gyeongsang Province	Uiseong	Kim Sang-nyeon	DRP
North Gyeongsang Province	Andong City–Andong County	Park Hae-chung	NDP
North Gyeongsang Province	Cheongsong–Yeongdeok	Mun Tae-jun	DRP
North Gyeongsang Province	Yeongyang–Uljin	O Jun-seok	DRP
North Gyeongsang Province	Yeongcheon	Jeong Jin-hwa	DRP
North Gyeongsang Province	Gyeongsan	Lee Hyeong-u	NDP
North Gyeongsang Province	Cheongdo	Park Suk-hyeon	DRP
North Gyeongsang Province	Seongju–Chilgok	Kim Chang-hwan	NDP
North Gyeongsang Province	Sangju	Kim In	DRP
North Gyeongsang Province	Mungyeong	Ko U-jin	DRP
North Gyeongsang Province	Yecheon	Jo Jae-bong	National (Note: Independent at the end of the member's term.)
North Gyeongsang Province	Yeongju	Kim Chang-geun	DRP
North Gyeongsang Province	Bonghwa	Gwon Seong-gi	DRP
South Gyeongsang Province	Masan	Hwang Eun-hwan	NDP
South Gyeongsang Province	Jinju–Jinyang	Gu Tae-hoe	DRP
South Gyeongsang Province	Chungmu–Tongyeong	Kim Gi-seop	NDP
South Gyeongsang Province	Goseong	Choi Jae-gu	DRP
South Gyeongsang Province	Geoje	Lee Hak-man	DRP
South Gyeongsang Province	Jinhae–Changwon	Hwang Nak-ju	NDP
South Gyeongsang Province	Samcheonpo–Seocheon	Choi Se-gyeong	DRP
South Gyeongsang Province	Hadong	Eom Gi-pyo	DRP
South Gyeongsang Province	Haman–Uiryeong	Jo Hong-rae	NDP
South Gyeongsang Province	Changnyeong	Kim Lee-gwon	NDP
South Gyeongsang Province	Sancheong	Jeong U-sik	DRP
South Gyeongsang Province	Hapcheon	Lee Sang-sin	NDP
South Gyeongsang Province	Milyang	Park Il	NDP
South Gyeongsang Province	Yangsan–Dongnae	Sin Sang-u	NDP
South Gyeongsang Province	Ulsan–Ulju	Choi Hyeong-u	NDP
South Gyeongsang Province	Gimhae	Kim Yeong-byeong	DRP
South Gyeongsang Province	Namhae	Sin Dong-gwan	DRP
South Gyeongsang Province	Hamyang–Geochang	Min Byeong-gwon	DRP
Jeju Province	Jeju–Bukjeju	Hong Byeong-cheol	DRP
Jeju Province	Namjeju	Hyeon O-bong	DRP
National	Proportional representation	Kim Jong-pil	DRP
National	Proportional representation	Chung Il-kwon	DRP
National	Proportional representation	Paik Too-chin	DRP
National	Proportional representation	Gil Jae-ho (Note: Gil Jae-ho resigned on 5 October 1971.)	DRP
National	Proportional representation	Kim Hyong-uk	DRP
National	Proportional representation	Gwon O-byeong	DRP
National	Proportional representation	Hwang Jong-ryul (Note: Hwang Jong-ryul died on 21 January 1972.)	DRP
National	Proportional representation	Lee Dong-won	DRP
National	Proportional representation	Lee Jong-u	DRP
National	Proportional representation	Yu Bong-yeong	DRP
National	Proportional representation	Hong Seung-man	DRP
National	Proportional representation	Mo Yun-suk	DRP
National	Proportional representation	Choi Yong-su	DRP
National	Proportional representation	Lee Hae-rang	DRP
National	Proportional representation	Gang Byeong-gyu	DRP
National	Proportional representation	Gang Seong-won	DRP
National	Proportional representation	Mun Chang-tak	DRP
National	Proportional representation	Gwon Il	DRP
National	Proportional representation	Kim Seong-du	DRP
National	Proportional representation	Sin Gwang-sun	DRP
National	Proportional representation	Park Tae-won	DRP
National	Proportional representation	Park Cheol	DRP
National	Proportional representation	Jeon Jeong-gu	DRP
National	Proportional representation	Jang Deok-jin	DRP
National	Proportional representation	Lee Do-seon	DRP
National	Proportional representation	Kim Hyeon-suk	DRP
National	Proportional representation	Pyeon Jeong-hui	DRP
National	Proportional representation	Kim Ok-ja (Note: Kim Ok-ja took office on 5 October 1971, to succeed Gil Jae-ho.)	DRP
National	Proportional representation	No Jin-hwan (Note: No Jin-hwan took office on 21 January 1972, to succeed Hwang Jong-ryul.)	DRP
National	Proportional representation	Yu Chin-san	NDP
National	Proportional representation	Kim Dae-jung	NDP
National	Proportional representation	Hong Ik-pyo	NDP
National	Proportional representation	Kim Hong-il	NDP
National	Proportional representation	Kim Ui-taek	NDP
National	Proportional representation	Ryu Cheong	NDP
National	Proportional representation	Jeong Heon-ju	NDP
National	Proportional representation	Lee Jong-nam	NDP
National	Proportional representation	Lee Se-gyu	NDP
National	Proportional representation	Pyeon Yong-ho	NDP
National	Proportional representation	Kim Jun-seop	NDP
National	Proportional representation	Chae Mun-sik	NDP
National	Proportional representation	Lee Sang-jo	NDP
National	Proportional representation	Sin Do-hwan	NDP
National	Proportional representation	Kim Jae-hwa	NDP
National	Proportional representation	Kim Yong-seong	NDP
National	Proportional representation	Gang Pil-seon	NDP
National	Proportional representation	O Se-eung	NDP
National	Proportional representation	Yu Seong-beom	NDP
National	Proportional representation	Jeong Gyu-heon	NDP
National	Proportional representation	Lee Dae-u	NDP
National	Proportional representation	O Hong-seok	NDP
National	Proportional representation	Park Jong-yul	NDP
National	Proportional representation	Kim Yun-deok	NDP

== See also ==
- 1971 South Korean legislative election
- National Assembly (South Korea)#History
