= 1978 South Korean legislative election =

- Directly elected members
- 12 December 1978

154 of the 231 seats in the National Assembly 116 seats needed for a majority
- Turnout: 77.08% (▲5.72pp)
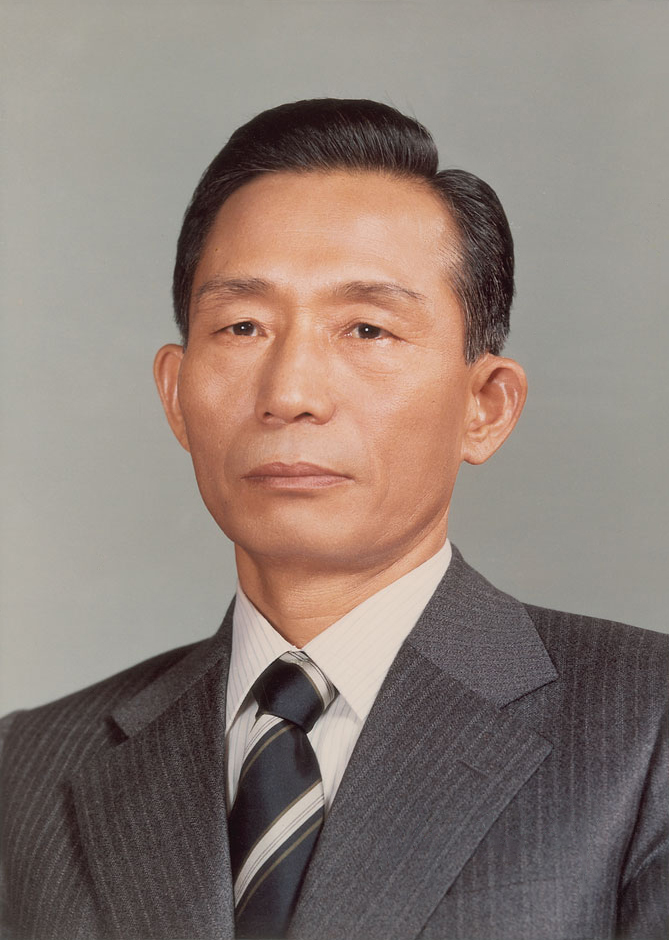

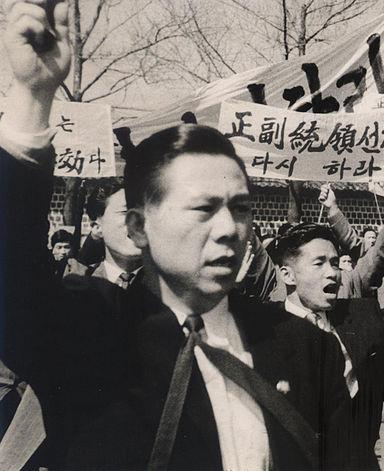

	Majority party	Minority party	Third party
Leader	Park Chung Hee	Yi Cheol-seung	Yang il-dong
Party	Democratic Republican	New Democratic	Democratic Unification
Last election	73 seats	52 seats	2 seats
Seats won	68	61	3
Seat change	▼5	▲9	▲1
Popular vote	4,695,955	4,861,204	1,095,507
Percentage	31.70%	32.82%	7.39%
Swing	▼6.98pp	▲0.27pp	▼2.75pp
- Presidential appointees
- 21 December 1978
- 77 seats of the National Assembly for Presidential appointees
Party	Leader	Vote %	Seats	+/–
Independents	Park Chung Hee	99.10	77	+4
This lists parties that won seats. See the complete results below.
Results by constituency
Speaker before	Speaker after
Chung Il-kwon; Democratic Republican	Baek Du-jin; Presidential appointee

Legislative elections were held in South Korea on 12 December 1978 to elect 154 members of the National Assembly. Another 77 members appointed by President Park Chung-hee were indirectly elected by the National Conference for Unification on 21 December 1978.

Despite garnering 169,000 fewer popular votes than the opposition New Democratic Party, the ruling Democratic Republican Party won a supermajority victory with 68 of the 154 elected seats in the National Assembly and an additional 77 members appointed by President Park. Voter turnout was 77.1%.

== Electoral system ==
Two-thirds of the seats were elected from two-member constituencies via single non-transferable vote. The remaining one-third of the seats were presidential appointees, nominated by president Park and confirmed by the National Conference for Unification elected in May 1978.

== Results ==
Graph of the party split among 231 seats.
Party	Votes	%	Seats	+/–
New Democratic Party	4,861,204	32.82	61	+9
Democratic Republican Party	4,695,995	31.70	68	–5
Democratic Unification Party	1,095,057	7.39	3	+1
Independents	4,160,187	28.09	22	+3
Presidential appointees			77	+4
Total	14,812,443	100.00	231	+12
Valid votes	14,812,443	98.60		
Invalid/blank votes	210,927	1.40		
Total votes	15,023,370	100.00		
Registered voters/turnout	19,489,490	77.08		
Source: Nohlen et al.

=== By city/province ===
Region	Total seats	Seats won			
Region	Total seats	DRP	NDP	DUP	Ind.
Seoul	22	9	11	1	1
Busan	10	4	5	0	1
Gyeonggi	16	8	7	0	1
Gangwon	10	5	3	0	2
North Chungcheong	8	3	4	1	0
South Chungcheong	14	7	5	0	2
North Jeolla	12	6	4	0	2
South Jeolla	20	8	7	1	4
North Gyeongsang	22	9	8	0	5
South Gyeongsang	18	8	7	0	3
Jeju	2	1	0	0	1
Total	146	68	61	3	22

=== Presidential appointees ===
On 21 December 1978, the National Conference for Unification indirectly elected 77 members of the National Assembly appointed by President Park Chung-hee. Out of the 2,581 delegates, 2,573 were present with 2,539 of them approving the election of Park's appointees.

Party	Votes	%	Seats
Presidential appointees	2,539	99.10	77
Against	23	0.90	–
Total	2,562	100.00	77
Valid votes	2,562	99.57	
Invalid/blank votes	11	0.43	
Total votes	2,573	100.00	
Registered voters/turnout	2,581	99.69	
Source: JoongAng Ilbo

==== By city/province ====
Region	Votes			Delegates		
Region	For	Against	Invalid	Voted	Absent	Total
Seoul	376	9	4	389	2	391
Busan	143	1	1	145	0	145
Gyeonggi	319	0	0	319	0	319
Gangwon	149	2	0	151	0	151
North Chungcheong	130	1	0	131	0	131
South Chungcheong	229	4	1	234	0	234
North Jeolla	200	1	0	201	2	203
South Jeolla	310	1	1	312	0	312
North Gyeongsang	373	2	1	376	3	379
South Gyeongsang	284	2	2	288	1	289
Jeju	26	0	1	27	0	27
Total	2,539	23	11	2,573	8	2,581
Source: Naver News Library
