= Democratic Unification Party (South Korea) =

1973–1980 political party in South Korea

The Democratic Unification Party (Korean: 민주통일당; Hanja: 民主統一黨) was a conservative political party in the Fourth Republic of South Korea. Its official abbreviation was the Unification Party.

== Overview ==
On 27 January 1973, Kim Hong-il, Yang Il-dong, Yoon Je-sul, and other anti-establishment leaders from the New Democratic Party (a Third Republic opposition party) formed the Democratic Unification Party, with the slogan, “Establishing a new path forward for the party.” Yang Il-dong served as the Chief Representative.

On 17 October 1972, President Park Chung-hee’s special proclamation (the October Restoration) had led to the cessation of political activity in South Korea. Because the Democratic Unification Party was established hurriedly, one month after the eventual resumption of political activity (on 12 December 1972), the party experienced a crushing defeat in the February 1973 legislative elections, with only 2 of the 57 candidates they backed winning their respective elections.

After that, the Democratic Unification Party was resigned to its position as minor political party, and managed to win only three seats in the 1978 legislative elections. Not long after, the party was dissolved by a supplementary provision in the Constitution of the Fifth Republic, which was promulgated in 1980, a year after Park Chung-hee’s assassination on 26 October 1979.

== Electoral Strength ==
General Elections in the National Assembly
Date	Election	Seats Won	Percentage of Votes
27 February 1973	9th General Election	2	10.2%
12 December 1978	10th General Election	3	7.4%
