= Kim Do-yeon (politician) =

South Korean politician (1894–1967)

- Born: June 16, 1894
- Died: April 19, 1967 (aged 72)
- Occupations: politician, independence activist

Kim Do-yeon (Korean: 김도연; Hanja: 金度演; June 6, 1894 – April 19, 1967) was a Korean independence activist, politician and member of the cabinet.
