= New Democratic Party (South Korea) =

1967–1980 political party in South Korea

New Democratic Party 신민당
- Abbreviation: NDP
- Leader: Yu Jin-oh
- Founded: 7 February 1967 (First iteration); 22 September 1969 (Second iteration)
- Dissolved: 8 September 1969 (First iteration); 27 October 1980 (Second iteration)
- Succeeded by: New Korean Democratic Party (1985)
- Ideology: Liberal democracy

Party flag

- New Democratic Party
- Hangul: 신민당
- Hanja: 新民黨
- RR: Sinmindang
- MR: Sinmindang

The New Democratic Party (NDP; Korean: 신민당) was a South Korean opposition party that existed from 1967 to 1980, when it was forcibly dissolved by the ninth amendment of the constitution promulgated by Chun Doo-hwan the same year. It was the main opposition party during the Park Chung Hee dictatorial regime, and especially since 1972, when the Yushin constitution was put into effect.

== Timeline of the party ==
- 7 February 1967 – founded as a coalition of the parties opposing the Park regime – that is, the New Korea Party led by former President Yun Bo-seon and Populist Party led by Park Sun-cheon.
- 21 February 1967 – officially registered.
- 8 September 1969 – internal party crisis, as there is no consensus about the amendment of the constitution to allow Park Chung-hee run for a third reelection.
- 21 September 1969 – the party is again registered.
- 26 January 1970 – the Liberal Party representatives join the NDP.
- 3 February 1970 – the independents in the National Assembly of South Korea join the NDP to strengthen the opposition.
- March 1971 – the party unanimously elects Kim Dae-jung as candidate in the presidential election.
- 1973–1979 – Kim Young-sam as New Democratic Party leader in the National Assembly
- 27 October 1980 – the party is dissolved by the transitory dispositions of the Constitution of the Fifth Republic of South Korea.

== Election results ==
=== President ===
Election	Candidate	Votes	%	Result
1967	Yun Bo-seon	4,526,541	40.93	Not elected
1971	Kim Dae-jung	5,395,900	45.26	Not elected

=== Legislature ===
Election	Leader	Votes	%	Seats				Position	Status
Election	Leader	Votes	%	Constituency	Party list	Total	+/–	Position	Status
1967	Yu Jin-o	3,554,224	32.74	28 / 131	17 / 44	45 / 175	new	2nd	Opposition
1971	Kim Hong-il	4,969,050	44.38	65 / 153	24 / 51	89 / 204	▲44	2nd	Opposition
1973	Yu Chin-san	3,577,300	32.55			52 / 146	▼37	2nd	Opposition
1978	Yi Cheol-seung	4,861,204	32.82			61 / 154	▲9	2nd	Opposition

== See also ==
- Democratic Party (South Korea, 2008)
- Democratic Party (South Korea, 2011)
- New Politics Alliance for Democracy
