= 1975 South Korean constitutional referendum =

- 12 February 1975
- For or against the restoration constitution

Results
Choice	Votes	%
Yes	9,800,201	74.41%
No	3,370,085	25.59%
Valid votes	13,170,286	98.25%
Invalid or blank votes	233,959	1.75%
Total votes	13,404,245	100.00%
Registered voters/turnout	16,788,839	79.84%

A constitutional referendum was held in South Korea on 12 February 1975. The referendum was aimed at confirming the authenticity of the constitution, and was approved by 74% of voters, with a turnout of 80%.

== Background ==
The Fourth Republic of South Korea, or the 'Restoration Regime,' was established after the October Restoration in October 1972. However, there was increasing resistance from opposition forces and student protesters after Emergency Measures No. 1 (Note: The emergency measures were passed on the basis of Article 53 of the Constitution of the Fourth Republic (Presidential Emergency Measures) and were abused as a means of suppressing democratization movements during the Fourth Republic. Emergency Measure No. 1 was decreed for the purpose of suppressing a signature campaign for constitutional amendment that had been ongoing since December 1973, with the aim of amending the Restoration Constitution. The contents of No. 1 are as follows: 1. Any acts that repudiate, oppose, distort, or defame the Constitution are prohibited.; 2. Any acts that advocate, propose, or petition for the amendment or abolishment of the Constitution are prohibited.; 3. Any acts of spreading baseless rumors are prohibited.; 4. Any acts of encouraging, inciting, or otherwise promoting the conduct prohibited in the previous clauses, or making such conduct known to others through broadcasting, reporting, publishing, or any other means, is prohibited.; 5. Any individual who violates or defames the above measures will be subject to arrest, search, and seizure without a court warrant, and will be sentenced to imprisonment with hard labor for a period not exceeding 15 years. In such cases, a suspension of qualifications of up to 15 years may be concurrently imposed.; 6. Any individual who violates or defames the above measures will be judged in an emergency military court (established on the basis of the concurrently decreed Emergency Measure No. 2).) and No. 4 (Note: The emergency measures were related to the "Democratic Youth League Incident", which came to light in April 1974. The chief contents of Emergency Measure No. 4 were: 1. Any actions involving or otherwise related to the National Federation of Democratic Youth and Students and its related organizations are prohibited, including mass demonstrations by students; 2. It is left to the discretion of the Minister of Education to expel or shut down students and schools who violate the emergency measures.) were lifted in August 1974. When the New Democratic Party, the largest opposition party at the time, elected 47-year-old Kim Young-sam as its president at its 22 August convention, (Note: Following the death of New Democratic Party Chairman Yu Chin-san on April 28 the same year, this party convention was held for the purpose of determining his successor. Yu Chin-san’s death and Kim Young-sam’s inauguration as party leader came to signify a generational change in the opposition party.) the party abandoned its former stance of cooperation with the government to actively pursue constitutional amendments and democratic restoration. On 27 November the National Congress for the Restoration of Democracy was launched, composed of more than 60 people from the political, religious, academic, media and legal circles. Opposition parties and the private sector began working together to promote a movement to repeal the new constitution and democratize the country through constitutional amendments.

Opposition to the Restoration Regime continued to increase, and as the degree of political turmoil intensified, President Park Chung-hee unexpectedly issued a special statement on 23 January 1975, announcing that a referendum would be held to ask the people about their confidence in the Restoration Constitution and the Restoration Regime. In the statement he expressed that the upcoming referendum would not just be a vote of confidence in the constitution, but also for him as president. He declared that in the event that voters favored abolishing the constitution, he would view it as a lack of confidence in his presidency and promptly step down.

Opposition parties expressed their opposition to the referendum, pointing out that the referendum law made it nearly impossible to campaign for or against the referendum until the day before the vote, and that it excluded people affiliated with political parties from observing the voting or the counting of ballots. Opposition parties and protest movements thus boycotted the referendum.

== Results ==
The Restoration constitution was upheld by 74% of voters with an 80% turnout.

Choice	Votes	%
For	9,800,201	74.41
Against	3,370,085	25.59
Total	13,170,286	100.00
Valid votes	13,170,286	98.25
Invalid/blank votes	233,959	1.75
Total votes	13,404,245	100.00
Registered voters/turnout	16,788,839	79.84
Source: Spokesperson's Office

== Aftermath ==
The day after the votes were counted, Park issued the following statement: "Based on the national legitimacy reaffirmed by this referendum, we will continue to develop a national political system based on the unity of all citizens." On 15 February he took measures to release all violators of Emergency Measures No. 1 and No. 4 from prison, except those from the People's Revolutionary Party Incident and those who violated the Anti-Communist Law.
