= National Congress for the Restoration of Democracy =

1974–1975 organization in South Korea

The National Congress for the Restoration of Democracy (Korean: 민주회복국민회의; Hanja: 民主回復國民會議) was a coalition of democratization movements in South Korea under the Fourth Republic, and was established on 25 December 1974. Its abbreviated name was the "National Congress".

== Overview ==
The National Congress held up the goal of democratic restoration, prescribed its organizational character as a “pan-national, non-political organization that advances a national movement without engaging in political activity,” and adopted “autonomy, peace, and conscience” as its code of conduct.

The democratization movement opposed to the personal dictatorship of President Park Chung-hee—the so-called Restoration Regime—was suppressed through Emergency Order No. 1, proclaimed in January 1974, and Emergency Order No.4, proclaimed in April 1974 in connection with the Democratic Youth League Incident. However, when the Emergency Measures were lifted in August, the democratization movement gained momentum again, with active movements developing among people from various fields, including opposition parties, students, religious figures, and journalists.

On 27 November, 71 representatives from various fields gathered at a Christian church in Jongno, Seoul, and held the Assembly for the Declaration of Democratic Resotration. The group included Yun Po-sun (former President), Yu Jin-o (former leader of the New Democratic Party and scholar of constitutional law), Kim Young-sam (then leader of the New Democratic Party), Yang Il-dong (Korean Democratic Unionist Party representative), Ham Seok-heon (religious leader), Cheon Gwan-u (orator), Yun Hyeong-jung (religious leader), Lee Byeong-lin (lawyer), and Lee Tai-young (lawyer). At this assembly, a resolution was passed to establish the National Congress for the Restoration of Democracy. The assembly also adopted a six-point “National Declaration,” which called for amending the current constitution to a democratic one through a reasonable process, releasing all political prisoners subject to prison sentences, detentions, or house arrest and restoring their political rights, and guaranteeing freedom of speech.

On 25 December that same year, the National Congress for the Restoration of Democracy was officially launched at its founding meeting, held at the Seoul YMCA Hall. Ten members were elected as committee representatives, including Yun Hyeong-jung (regular representative), Lee Byeong-lin, Lee Tai-young, Yang Il-dong, and Ham Seok-heon, while another six were elected as members of the steering committee, including Hong Seong-u, Han Seung-heon, and Ham Se-ung. In addition, another 18 people, including Yun Po-sun and Kim Dae-jung, were elected as advisors.

By March 1975, three months after its formal establishment, branches had been formed in 7 cities and provinces, along with 20 additional cities and counties. As the central force within the democratization movement, the National Congress launched a boycott of the national referendum held on February 12 regarding the Restoration Constitution, as well as a Declaration of Conscience movement to declare the confessions, statements, and memorandums compelled by investigative authorities invalid. However, from the very beginning, the group was subjected to severe government oppression, including the dismissal of university professors who had signed the National Declaration and the arrest of lawyers involved in the management of the National Congress. Following the proclamation of Emergency Order No. 9 in May 1975, the activities of the National Congress were completely shut down.

Signatories of the National Declaration of Democratic Restoration (71 Individuals)
Classification	Full Name
Elder Statesman	Yun Po-sun, Baek Nak-jun, Lee In, Kim Hong-il, Yu Jin-oh, Jeong Il-hyeong, Jeong Hwa-am
Independence Activist	Kim Jae-ho, Ahn Jae-hwan, Yu Seok-hyun
Constituent National Assembly Member	Jin Heon-sik, Song Jin-baek, Hwang Ho-hyun
Catholic	Yun Hyeong-jung, Ham Se-ung, Shin Hyeon-bong, Kim Tak-am, Ahn Chung-seok, Yang Hong, Lee Chang-bok, Park Sang-rae
Protestant	Kim Jae-jun, Ham Seok-heon, Kang Sin-myeong, Kang Won-ryong, Kim Gwan-seok, Yun Pan-ung, Jo Hyang-rok, Lee Sang-rin, Park Chang-gyun, Kang Gi-cheol, Gye Koon-tae
Buddhist	Beop-jeong
Academic	Lee Hee-seung, Jeong Seok-hae, Lee Dong-hwa, Jeon Gyeong-won, Park Bong-in, Seo Nam-dong, Mun Dong-hwan, Ahn Byeong-mo
Literati	Lee Heong-gu, Kim Jeong-han, Park Won-hee, Kim Gyu-dong, Baek Nak-cheong, Go Eun, Kim Yun-su, Kim Byeong-gyeol, Hong Sa-jung
Orator	Cheon Gwan-u, Lee Yeong-hee, Jang Yong-hak, Kim Yong-gu, Bu Wan-hyeok, Lim Jae-gyeong
Legal Professional	Lee Byeong-lin, Hong Seong-u, Hwang In-cheol, Han Seung-heon, Lim Gyeong-gu
Women's Activist	Lee Tai-young, Gong Deok-gwi, Lee U-jeong, Kim Jeong-ye
Politician	Kim Young-sam, Yang Il-dong, Ahn Pil-su, Go Heung-mun, Yun Jae-sul, Kim Cheol
