= List of members of the National Assembly (South Korea), 1960–1961 =

The members of the fifth National Assembly of South Korea were elected on 29 June 1960. The assembly sat from 29 July 1960 until 16 May 1961.

== House of Councillors ==
Members of the House of Councillors were grouped into two sets. Set 1 members were elected to a six-year term, while Set 2 members were elected to a three-year term.

Province/city	Set	Member	Party
Seoul	1	Baek Nak-jun	Independent
Seoul	1	Han Tong-suk	Democratic
Seoul	1	Kim Dong-myeong	Democratic
Seoul	2	Lee In	Independent
Seoul	2	Go Hui-dong	Democratic
Seoul	2	Jeon Yong-sun	Democratic
Gyeonggi Province	1	Yeo Un-hong	Independent
Gyeonggi Province	1	Jeong Nak-pil	Democratic
Gyeonggi Province	1	Sin Ui-sik	Liberal
Gyeonggi Province	2	Kim Yong-seong	Democratic
Gyeonggi Province	2	Lee Gyo-seon	Independent
Gyeonggi Province	2	Ha Sang-hun	Democratic
Gangwon Province	1	Jeong Sun-eung	Democratic
Gangwon Province	1	Kim Dae-sik (Note: Kim Dae-sik was removed on 8 March 1961.)	Independent
Gangwon Province	2	Kim Byeong-ro	Democratic
Gangwon Province	2	Kim Jin-gu	Democratic
North Chungcheong Province	1	Park Gi-un	Democratic
North Chungcheong Province	1	Song Pil-man	Democratic
North Chungcheong Province	2	Park Chan-hui	Democratic
North Chungcheong Province	2	O Beom-su (Note: O Beom-su was removed on 25 April 1961.)	Liberal
South Chungcheong Province	1	Lee Beom-seok	Independent
South Chungcheong Province	1	Sim Jong-seok	Democratic
South Chungcheong Province	1	Lee Beom-seung	Democratic
South Chungcheong Province	2	Lee Hun-gu	SMP
South Chungcheong Province	2	Jeong Geung-mo	Independent
South Chungcheong Province	2	Han Gwang-seok (Note: Han Gwang-seok was removed on 8 March 1961.)	Liberal
North Jeolla Province	1	So Seon-gyu	Democratic
North Jeolla Province	1	Gang Taek-su	Democratic
North Jeolla Province	1	Song Bang-yong	Independent
North Jeolla Province	2	Yang Chun-geun	Independent
North Jeolla Province	2	Eom Byeong-hak	Democratic
North Jeolla Province	2	Eom Min-yeong	Democratic
South Jeolla Province	1	Hwang Seong-su (Note: Hwang Seong-su was removed on 8 March 1961.)	Liberal
South Jeolla Province	1	Jo Guk-hyeon	Democratic
South Jeolla Province	1	Kim Nam-jung	Independent
South Jeolla Province	1	Lee Nam-gyu	Democratic
South Jeolla Province	2	Park Cheol-ung (Note: Park Cheol-ung was removed on 8 March 1961.)	Independent
South Jeolla Province	2	Jeong Mun-gap	Independent
South Jeolla Province	2	Choi Sang-chae	Democratic
South Jeolla Province	2	Yang Hoe-yeong	Democratic
North Gyeongsang Province	1	Baek Nam-eok	Democratic
North Gyeongsang Province	1	Lee Hyo-sang	Independent
North Gyeongsang Province	1	Song Gwan-su (Note: Song Gwan-su was removed on 8 March 1961.)	Independent
North Gyeongsang Province	1	Choi Hui-song	Democratic
North Gyeongsang Province	2	Lee Won-man	Democratic
North Gyeongsang Province	2	Gwon Dong-cheol	Independent
North Gyeongsang Province	2	Kim Jang-seop (Note: Kim Jang-seop was removed on 8 March 1961.)	Independent
North Gyeongsang Province	2	Choi Dal-hui	KSP
South Gyeongsang Province	1	An Ho-sang	Independent
South Gyeongsang Province	1	O Wi-yeong	Democratic
South Gyeongsang Province	1	Kim Yong-ju	Democratic
South Gyeongsang Province	1	Seol Chang-su	Democratic
South Gyeongsang Province	2	Yun Chi-hyeong	Democratic
South Gyeongsang Province	2	Kim Hyeong-du	Independent
South Gyeongsang Province	2	Jeong Sang-gu	GFIA
South Gyeongsang Province	2	Kim Dal-beom	Independent
Jeju Province	1	Gang Jae-ryang	Democratic
Jeju Province	2	Gang Gyeong-ok (Note: Gang Gyeong-ok was removed on 25 April 1961.)	Independent

== House of Representatives ==
Province/City	Constituency	Member	Party	
Province/City	Constituency	Member	At election	At term's end
Seoul	Jongno A	Yun Po-sun (Note: Yun Po-sun resigned on 12 August 1960, upon being elected as President of South Korea.)	Democratic	Democratic
Seoul	Jongno A	Jeon Jin-han (Note: Jeon Jin-han was by-elected on 10 October 1960, to succeed Yun Po-sun.)	Independent	KSP
Seoul	Jongno B	Han Geun-jo	Democratic	Democratic
Seoul	Jung A	Ju Yo-han	Democratic	Democratic
Seoul	Jung B	Jeong Il-hyeong	Democratic	Democratic
Seoul	Dongdaemun A	Min Gwan-sik	Democratic	NDP
Seoul	Dongdaemun B	Lee Yeong-jun	Democratic	NDP
Seoul	Seongdong A	Yu Seong-gwon	Democratic	Democratic
Seoul	Seongdong B	Hong Yong-jun	Democratic	NDP
Seoul	Seongbuk	Seo Beom-seok	Democratic	NDP
Seoul	Seodaemun A	Kim Do-yeon	Democratic	NDP
Seoul	Seodaemun B	Kim San	Democratic	NDP
Seoul	Mapo	Kim Sang-don (Note: Kim Sang-don resigned on 3 December 1960.)	Democratic	Independent
Seoul	Mapo	Sin Sang-cho (Note: Sin Sang-cho was by-elected on 10 February 1961, to succeed Kim Sang-don.)	Democratic	Democratic
Seoul	Yongsan A	Chang Myon	Democratic	Democratic
Seoul	Yongsan B	Kim Won-man	Democratic	Democratic
Seoul	Yeongdeungpo A	Yun Myeong-un	Democratic	Democratic
Seoul	Yeongdeungpo B	Kim Seok-won	Independent	Independent
Gyeonggi Province	Incheon A	Kim Jae-gon	Democratic	Democratic
Gyeonggi Province	Incheon B	Kwak Sang-hoon	Democratic	Democratic
Gyeonggi Province	Incheon C	Kim Hun	Democratic	Democratic
Gyeonggi Province	Suwon	Hong Gil-seon	Democratic	NDP
Gyeonggi Province	Goyang	Ryu Gwang-ryeol	Independent	NDP
Gyeonggi Province	Gwangju	Sin Ha-gyun	Independent	NDP
Gyeonggi Province	Yangju A	Gang Yeong-hun (Note: Gang Yeong-hun died on 15 August 1960.)	Democratic	Democratic
Gyeonggi Province	Yangju A	Jo Yun-hyeong (Note: Jo Yun-hyeong was by-elected on 10 October 1960, to succeed Gang Yeong-hun.)	Democratic	NDP
Gyeonggi Province	Yangju B	Gang Seung-gu	Democratic	NDP
Gyeonggi Province	Yeoncheon	Heo Hyeok	Democratic	NDP
Gyeonggi Province	Pocheon	Kim Yong-gu	Democratic	Democratic
Gyeonggi Province	Gapyeong	Hong Ik-pyo	Democratic	Democratic
Gyeonggi Province	Yangpyeong	Cheon Se-gi	Democratic	Democratic
Gyeonggi Province	Yeoju	Park Ju-un	Democratic	Democratic
Gyeonggi Province	Icheon	Choi Ha-yeong (Note: Choi Ha-yeong was removed on 21 February 1961.)	Independent	Independent
Gyeonggi Province	Icheon	Baek Du-jin (Note: Baek Du-jin was by-elected on 24 April 1961, to succeed Choi Ha-yeong.)	Independent	Independent
Gyeonggi Province	Yongin	Kim Yun-sik	Democratic	Democratic
Gyeonggi Province	Anseong	Kim Gap-su	Independent	NDP
Gyeonggi Province	Pyeongtaek	Lee Byeong-heon	Democratic	Democratic
Gyeonggi Province	Hwaseong A	Park Sang-muk	Independent	Democratic
Gyeonggi Province	Hwaseong B	Seo Tae-won	Independent	Independent
Gyeonggi Province	Siheung	Lee Jae-hyeong	Independent	Independent
Gyeonggi Province	Bucheon	Park Je-hwan	Independent	Independent
Gyeonggi Province	Gimpo	Jeong Jun (Note: Jeong Jun resigned on 5 December 1960.)	Independent	Independent
Gyeonggi Province	Gimpo	Heo Gil (Note: Heo Gil was by-elected on 10 February 1961, to succeed Jeong Jun.)	Democratic	Democratic
Gyeonggi Province	Ganghwa	Yun Jae-geun	Independent	Independent
Gyeonggi Province	Paju	Hwang In-won	Democratic	NDP
Gyeonggi Province	Ongjin	Son Chi-ho (Note: Son Chi-ho was removed on 13 December 1960, after his election was invalidated.)	Independent	Independent
Gyeonggi Province	Ongjin	Jang Ik-hyeon (Note: Jang Ik-hyeon was by-elected on 30 December 1960, to succeed Son Chi-ho.)	Independent	Independent
Gangwon Province	Chuncheon	Gye Gwang-sun	Democratic	Democratic
Gangwon Province	Wonju	Park Chung-mo	Democratic	Democratic
Gangwon Province	Gangneung	Kim Myeong-yun	Democratic	Democratic
Gangwon Province	Chunseong	Lee Chan-u	Independent	Independent
Gangwon Province	Hongcheon	Lee Jae-hak (Note: Lee Jae-hak was removed on 21 February 1961.)	Independent	Independent
Gangwon Province	Hongcheon	Lee Gyo-seon (Note: Lee Gyo-seon was by-elected on 24 April 1961, to succeed Lee Jae-hak.)	Independent	Independent
Gangwon Province	Hoeseong	Yang Deok-in	Democratic	Democratic
Gangwon Province	Wonseong	Yun Gil-jung	SMP	SMP
Gangwon Province	Yeongwol	Tae Wan-seon	Democratic	Democratic
Gangwon Province	Pyeongchang	Jang Chun-geun	Independent	Independent
Gangwon Province	Jeongseon	Sin In-u	Democratic	NDP
Gangwon Province	Cheolwon	Hwang Hak-seong	Independent	Democratic
Gangwon Province	Gimhwa	Sin Gi-bok	Democratic	Democratic
Gangwon Province	Hwacheon	Kim Jun-seop	Democratic	Democratic
Gangwon Province	Yanggu	Kim Jae-sun	Democratic	Democratic
Gangwon Province	Inje	Jeon Hyeong-san (Note: Jeon Hyeong-san was removed on 8 March 1961.)	Liberal	Liberal
Gangwon Province	Inje	Kim Dae-jung (Note: Kim Dae-jung was by-elected on 13 May 1961, to succeed Jeon Hyeong-san.)	Democratic	Democratic
Gangwon Province	Goseong	Kim Eung-jo	Independent	NDP
Gangwon Province	Yangyang	Ham Jong-bin	Democratic	Democratic
Gangwon Province	Myeongju	Choi Jun-gil	Democratic	Democratic
Gangwon Province	Samcheok	Choi Gyeong-sik	Democratic	Democratic
Gangwon Province	Uljin	Kim Gwang-jun	Democratic	Democratic
North Chungcheong Province	Cheongju	Lee Min-u	Democratic	NDP
North Chungcheong Province	Chungju	Kim Gi-cheol	Democratic	Democratic
North Chungcheong Province	Cheongwon A	Shin Jong-ho	Democratic	Democratic
North Chungcheong Province	Cheongwon B	Kim Chang-su	Democratic	NDP
North Chungcheong Province	Boeun	Park Gi-jong	Democratic	Democratic
North Chungcheong Province	Okcheon	Shin Gak-hyu	Democratic	NDP
North Chungcheong Province	Yeongdong	Min Jang-sik	Democratic	Democratic
North Chungcheong Province	Jincheon	Lee Chung-hwan	Democratic	NDP
North Chungcheong Province	Gwisan	An Dong-jun (Note: An Dong-jun was removed on 8 March 1961.)	Independent	Independent
North Chungcheong Province	Gwisan	Kim Sa-man (Note: Kim Sa-man was by-elected on 13 May 1961, to succeed An Dong-jun.)	Democratic	Democratic
North Chungcheong Province	Eumseong	Lee Jeong-seok (Note: Lee Jeong-seok was removed on 8 March 1961.)	Independent	Independent
North Chungcheong Province	Eumseong	Jeong In-so (Note: Jeong In-so was by-elected on 13 May 1961, to succeed Lee Jeong-seok.)	Independent	Independent
North Chungcheong Province	Chungwon	Jeong Sang-hui	Independent	Independent
North Chungcheong Province	Jecheon	Lee Tae-yong	Democratic	Democratic
North Chungcheong Province	Danyang	Jo Jong-ho	CRA	CRA
South Chungcheong Province	Daejeon A	Yu Jin-yeong	Democratic	Democratic
South Chungcheong Province	Daejeon B	Jin Hyeong-ha	Democratic	NDP
South Chungcheong Province	Daedeok	Park Byeong-bae	Independent	Independent
South Chungcheong Province	Yeongi	Seong Tae-gyeong	Democratic	Democratic
South Chungcheong Province	Gongju A	Park Chung-sik (Note: Park Chung-sik was removed on 4 April 1961, after his election was invalidated.)	Independent	Independent
South Chungcheong Province	Gongju A	Eom Dae-seop (Note: Eom Dae-seop was by-elected on 24 April 1961, to succeed Park Chung-sik.)	Democratic	Democratic
South Chungcheong Province	Gongju B	Kim Hak-jun	Democratic	Democratic
South Chungcheong Province	Nonsan A	Kim Cheon-su	Democratic	NDP
South Chungcheong Province	Nonsan B	Yun Dam	Democratic	NDP
South Chungcheong Province	Buyeo A	Lee Seok-gi	Democratic	Democratic
South Chungcheong Province	Buyeo B	Lee Jong-sun	Democratic	NDP
South Chungcheong Province	Seocheon	U Hui-chang	Democratic	Democratic
South Chungcheong Province	Boryeong	Kim Yeong-seon	Democratic	Democratic
South Chungcheong Province	Cheongyang	Lee Sang-cheol	Democratic	Democratic
South Chungcheong Province	Hongseong	Kim Yeong-hwan	Independent	Independent
South Chungcheong Province	Yesan	Seong Won-gyeong	Democratic	Democratic
South Chungcheong Province	Seosan A	Jang Gyeong-sun	Independent	Democratic
South Chungcheong Province	Seosan B	An Man-bok	Democratic	Democratic
South Chungcheong Province	Dangjin A	Lee Gyu-yeong	Democratic	Democratic
South Chungcheong Province	Dangjin B	Park Jun-seon	Democratic	NDP
South Chungcheong Province	Asan	Seong Gi-seon	Democratic	Democratic
South Chungcheong Province	Cheonan A	Hong Chun-sik	Democratic	NDP
South Chungcheong Province	Cheonan B	Lee Sang-don	Democratic	NDP
North Jeolla Province	Jeonju A	Yu Cheong	Democratic	NDP
North Jeolla Province	Jeonju B	Yi Cheol-seung	Democratic	Democratic
North Jeolla Province	Gunsan	Kim Pan-sul	Democratic	Democratic
North Jeolla Province	Iri	Lee Chun-gi	Democratic	Democratic
North Jeolla Province	Wanju A	Lee Jeong-won	Democratic	Democratic
North Jeolla Province	Wanju B	Bae Seong-gi	Democratic	Democratic
North Jeolla Province	Jinan	Jeon Hyu-sang	Independent	Independent
North Jeolla Province	Geumsan	Yu Chin-san	Democratic	NDP
North Jeolla Province	Muju	Shin Hyeon-don	Democratic	Democratic
North Jeolla Province	Jangsu	Song Yeong-seon	Independent	Democratic
North Jeolla Province	Imsil	Han Sang-jun	Independent	Democratic
North Jeolla Province	Namwon A	Park Hwan-saeng	SMP	SMP
North Jeolla Province	Namwon B	Yun Jeong-gu	Democratic	Democratic
North Jeolla Province	Sunchang	Hong Yeong-gi	Democratic	Democratic
North Jeolla Province	Jeongeup A	Na Yong-gyun	Democratic	Independent
North Jeolla Province	Jeongeup B	Song Neung-un (Note: Song Neung-un was removed on 8 March 1961.)	Independent	Independent
North Jeolla Province	Jeongeup B	Kim Seong-hwan (Note: Kim Seong-hwan was by-elected on 13 May 1961, to succeed Song Neung-un.)	Independent	Independent
North Jeolla Province	Gochang A	Ryu Jin	Democratic	NDP
North Jeolla Province	Gochang B	Kim Sang-heum	Independent	NDP
North Jeolla Province	Buan	Song Eul-sang	Democratic	Democratic
North Jeolla Province	Gimje A	Jo Han-baek	Democratic	NDP
North Jeolla Province	Gimje B	Yun Je-sul	Democratic	NDP
North Jeolla Province	Okgu	Yang Il-dong	Democratic	NDP
North Jeolla Province	Iksan A	Jo Gyu-wan	Democratic	NDP
North Jeolla Province	Iksan B	Yun Taek-jung	Democratic	Democratic
South Jeolla Province	Gwangju A	Jeong Seong-tae	Democratic	NDP
South Jeolla Province	Gwangju B	Kim Yong-hwan	Democratic	NDP
South Jeolla Province	Gwangju C	Lee Pil-seon	Democratic	Independent
South Jeolla Province	Mokpo	Kim Mun-ok	Democratic	Democratic
South Jeolla Province	Yeosu	Jeong Jae-wan	Democratic	Independent
South Jeolla Province	Suncheon	Yun Hyeong-nam	Democratic	NDP
South Jeolla Province	Gwangsan	Ko Mong-u	Democratic	NDP
South Jeolla Province	Damyang	Kim Dong-ho	Democratic	Democratic
South Jeolla Province	Gokseong	Yun Chu-seop	Democratic	Democratic
South Jeolla Province	Gurye	Ko Gi-bong	Democratic	Democratic
South Jeolla Province	Gwangyang	Kim Seok-ju	Democratic	Democratic
South Jeolla Province	Yeocheon	Kim U-pyeong	Democratic	NDP
South Jeolla Province	Seungju	Jo Yeon-ha	Democratic	Democratic
South Jeolla Province	Goheung A	Park Hyeong-geun	Democratic	NDP
South Jeolla Province	Goheung B	Seo Min-ho	Democratic	NDP
South Jeolla Province	Boseong	Lee Jeong-rae	Democratic	NDP
South Jeolla Province	Hwasun	Park Min-gi	Democratic	Democratic
South Jeolla Province	Jangheung	Ko Yeong-wan	Democratic	Democratic
South Jeolla Province	Gangjin	Yang Byeong-il	Democratic	Democratic
South Jeolla Province	Haenam A	Hong Gwang-pyo	Independent	Democratic
South Jeolla Province	Haenam B	Kim Chae-yong	Democratic	Democratic
South Jeolla Province	Yeongam	Kim Chun-yon	Unification	Unification
South Jeolla Province	Muan A	Kim Ok-hyeong	Democratic	NDP
South Jeolla Province	Muan B	Yu Ok-u	Democratic	NDP
South Jeolla Province	Muan C	Ju Do-yun	Democratic	Democratic
South Jeolla Province	Naju A	Jeong Mun-chae	Democratic	Democratic
South Jeolla Province	Naju B	Lee Gyeong	Democratic	NDP
South Jeolla Province	Hampyeong	Kim Ui-taek	Democratic	NDP
South Jeolla Province	Yeonggwang	Jo Yeong-gyu	Democratic	NDP
South Jeolla Province	Jangseong	Kim Byeong-su	Democratic	NDP
South Jeolla Province	Wando	Kim Seon-tae	Democratic	Democratic
South Jeolla Province	Jindo	Park Hui-su	Democratic	Democratic
North Gyeongsang Province	Daegu A	Seo Dong-jin	Democratic	Democratic
North Gyeongsang Province	Daegu B	Seo Sang-il	SMP	SMP
North Gyeongsang Province	Daegu C	Lim Mun-seok	Democratic	Democratic
North Gyeongsang Province	Daegu D	Jo Jae-cheon	Democratic	Democratic
North Gyeongsang Province	Daegu E	Jo Il-hwan	Democratic	Democratic
North Gyeongsang Province	Daegu F	Jang Yeong-mo	Democratic	NDP
North Gyeongsang Province	Pohang	Lee Sang-myeon (Note: Lee Sang-myeon was removed on 11 April 1961.)	Democratic	Democratic
North Gyeongsang Province	Gimcheon	Kim Se-yeong	Independent	Independent
North Gyeongsang Province	Gyeongju	O Jeong-guk	Democratic	Democratic
North Gyeongsang Province	Dalseong	Park Jun-gyu	Democratic	NDP
North Gyeongsang Province	Gunwi	Mun Myeong-ho	Democratic	Democratic
North Gyeongsang Province	Uiseong A	O Sang-sik	Democratic	NDP
North Gyeongsang Province	Uiseong B	U Hong-gu	Democratic	Democratic
North Gyeongsang Province	Andong A	Kim Si-hyeon	Independent	Independent
North Gyeongsang Province	Andong B	Park Hae-chung	Democratic	Democratic
North Gyeongsang Province	Cheongsong	Shim Gil-seop	Democratic	Democratic
North Gyeongsang Province	Yeongyang	Park Jong-gil (Note: Park Jong-gil was removed on 25 April 1961.)	Independent	Independent
North Gyeongsang Province	Yeongdeok	Kim Yeong-su	Democratic	NDP
North Gyeongsang Province	Yeongil A	Choi Tae-neung	Democratic	Democratic
North Gyeongsang Province	Yeongil B	Choi Hae-yong	Democratic	Democratic
North Gyeongsang Province	Wolseong A	Kim Jong-hae	Independent	Democratic
North Gyeongsang Province	Wolseong B	Hwang Han-su	Democratic	Democratic
North Gyeongsang Province	Yeongcheon A	Jo Heon-su	Democratic	Democratic
North Gyeongsang Province	Yeongcheon B	Kwon Jung-don	Democratic	NDP
North Gyeongsang Province	Gyeongsan	Park Hae-jeong	Democratic	Democratic
North Gyeongsang Province	Cheongdo	Kim Jun-tae	Democratic	Democratic
North Gyeongsang Province	Goryeong	Kwak Tae-jin	Democratic	Democratic
North Gyeongsang Province	Seongju	Ju Byeong-hwan	Democratic	Democratic
North Gyeongsang Province	Chilgok	Chang Taek-sang	Independent	Independent
North Gyeongsang Province	Geumneung	U Don-gyu	Independent	Independent
North Gyeongsang Province	Seonsan	Shin Ju-won	Independent	Independent
North Gyeongsang Province	Sangju A	Hong Jeong-pyo	Democratic	Democratic
North Gyeongsang Province	Sangju B	Kim Gi-yeong	Independent	Democratic
North Gyeongsang Province	Mungyeong	Lee Byeong-ha	Democratic	Democratic
North Gyeongsang Province	Yecheon	Hyeon Seok-ho	Democratic	Democratic
North Gyeongsang Province	Yeongju	Hwang Ho-yeong	Democratic	Democratic
North Gyeongsang Province	Bonghwa	Choi Yeong-du	Independent	Democratic
North Gyeongsang Province	Ulleung	Jeon Seok-bong	Independent	Democratic
South Gyeongsang Province	Jung, Busan	Kim Eung-ju	Democratic	Democratic
South Gyeongsang Province	Seo A, Busan	Kim Young-sam	Democratic	NDP
South Gyeongsang Province	Seo B, Busan	Kim Dong-uk	Democratic	Democratic
South Gyeongsang Province	Yeongdo A, Busan	Choi Seong-uk	Democratic	Democratic
South Gyeongsang Province	Yeongdo B, Busan	Lee Man-u	Democratic	Democratic
South Gyeongsang Province	Dong A, Busan	Park Sun-cheon	Democratic	Democratic
South Gyeongsang Province	Dong B, Busan	Lee Jong-rin	Democratic	Democratic
South Gyeongsang Province	Busanjin A, Busan	Lee Jong-nam	Democratic	Democratic
South Gyeongsang Province	Busanjin B, Busan	Park Chan-hyeon	Democratic	Democratic
South Gyeongsang Province	Dongnae, Busan	Kim Myeong-su	Democratic	Democratic
South Gyeongsang Province	Masan	Jeong Nam-gyu	Democratic	Democratic
South Gyeongsang Province	Jinju	Kim Yong-jin	Democratic	Democratic
South Gyeongsang Province	Chungmu	Choi Cheon	Democratic	NDP
South Gyeongsang Province	Jinhae	Kim Byeong-jin	Democratic	Democratic
South Gyeongsang Province	Samcheonpo	Lee Jae-hyeon	Independent	Independent
South Gyeongsang Province	Jinyang	Hwang Nam-pal	Democratic	Democratic
South Gyeongsang Province	Uiryeong	Kang Bong-yong	Democratic	Democratic
South Gyeongsang Province	Haman	Han Jong-geon	Democratic	Democratic
South Gyeongsang Province	Changnyeong	Park Gi-jeong	Democratic	Democratic
South Gyeongsang Province	Milyang A	Baek Nam-hun	Democratic	NDP
South Gyeongsang Province	Milyang B	Park Gwon-hui	SMP	SMP
South Gyeongsang Province	Yangsan	Lim Gi-tae	Independent	Independent
South Gyeongsang Province	Ulsan A	Choi Yeong-geun	Democratic	Democratic
South Gyeongsang Province	Ulsan B	Jeong Hae-yeong	Independent	NDP
South Gyeongsang Province	Dongnae	Jo Il-jae	Democratic	Democratic
South Gyeongsang Province	Gimhae A	Choi Won-ho	Democratic	Democratic
South Gyeongsang Province	Gimhae B	Seo Jeong-won	Independent	Independent
South Gyeongsang Province	Cheongwon A	Lee Yang-ho	Democratic	Democratic
South Gyeongsang Province	Cheongwon B	Kim Bong-jae	Independent	Independent
South Gyeongsang Province	Tongyeong	Seo Jeong-gwi	Democratic	Democratic
South Gyeongsang Province	Geoje	Yun Byeong-han	Democratic	Democratic
South Gyeongsang Province	Goseong	Choi Seok-rim (Note: Choi Seok-rim was removed on 4 April 1961, after his election was invalidated.)	Liberal	Liberal
South Gyeongsang Province	Goseong	Kim Gi-yong (Note: Kim Gi-yong was by-elected on 24 April 1961, to succeed Choi Seok-rim.)	Independent	Independent
South Gyeongsang Province	Sacheon	Jeong Heon-ju	Democratic	Democratic
South Gyeongsang Province	Namhae	Choi Chi-hwan (Note: Choi Chi-hwan was removed on 8 March 1961.)	Independent	Independent
South Gyeongsang Province	Namhae	Kim Jong-gil (Note: Kim Jong-gil was by-elected on 13 May 1961, to succeed Choi Chi-hwan.)	Democratic	Democratic
South Gyeongsang Province	Hadong	Yun Jong-su	Independent	Independent
South Gyeongsang Province	Sancheong	Jo Myeong-hwan	Democratic	Democratic
South Gyeongsang Province	Hamyang	Jeong Jun-hyeon	Democratic	Democratic
South Gyeongsang Province	Geochang	Sin Jung-ha	Democratic	Democratic
South Gyeongsang Province	Hapcheon A	Lee Sang-sin	Democratic	NDP
South Gyeongsang Province	Hapcheon B	Jeong Gil-yeong	Democratic	Democratic
Jeju Province	Jeju	Go Dam-ryong	Democratic	NDP
Jeju Province	Bukjeju	Hong Mun-jung	Independent	Democratic
Jeju Province	Namjeju	Kim Seong-suk	KSP	KSP

== See also ==
- 1960 South Korean parliamentary election
- National Assembly (South Korea)#History
- House of Councillors (South Korea)
- House of Representatives (South Korea)
