= New Democratic Party (1960–1961) =

1960–1961 political party in South Korea

The New Democratic Party (Korean: 신민당; Hanja: 新民黨) was a political party in South Korea. Although there were additional “New Democratic Parties” during the Third and Fourth Republics of South Korea, this article concerns the New Democratic Party that existed in 1961 during the Second Republic of South Korea.

== History and development ==
After the so-called April Revolution (a series of student demonstrations in response the electoral fraud of the March 1960 presidential election) led to the collapse of the Syngman Rhee regime, the 1960 South Korean parliamentary election was held, in which the opposition Democratic Party achieved a majority in both the House of Representatives and the House of Councillors.

However, within the Democratic Party, conflict continued between the new faction, centered around politicians who held key positions in the former regime, and the old faction, which had its roots in the former Democratic Nationalist Party (a conservative party that descended from the Korea Democratic Party). This conflict rapidly intensified during the approval process for a new prime minister following the election.^{a} After rejecting the proposal to approve Kim Do-yeon, the old faction nominee of President Yun Po-sun, the leader of the new faction, Chang Myon, assumed the post of prime minister, prompting the old faction to separate from the party and declare the formation of a new party on 13 October that year.

On 24 November, the Old Faction Association of Comrades, the intra-parliamentary bargaining group of the old faction assembly members, officially changed its name to the “New Democratic Party.” The party was officially launched through a preparatory assembly on 8 November 1960 and a party convention on 20 February 1961, with Kim Do-yeon chosen as committee chair (party leader) and Yu Chin-san chosen as Secretary General. However, the party was forcibly dissolved by an edict of the military government that was established following the May 16 coup later that year. The Civil Rule Party, which was later established as an opposition party just prior to the start of the Third Republic, included many politicians who had been active in the former New Democratic Party, starting with Yun Po-sun.

== Footnotes ==
a. During the Second Republic, the South Korean government changed from a president-centered system to a parliamentary system, and the prime minister thus became the supreme governmental authority. As a result, the question of which faction would the prime ministry became a major focal point of debate.
