= Kidnapping of Kim Dae-jung =

1973 kidnapping of dissident leader Kim Dae-jung by the South Korean CIA in Tokyo, Japan

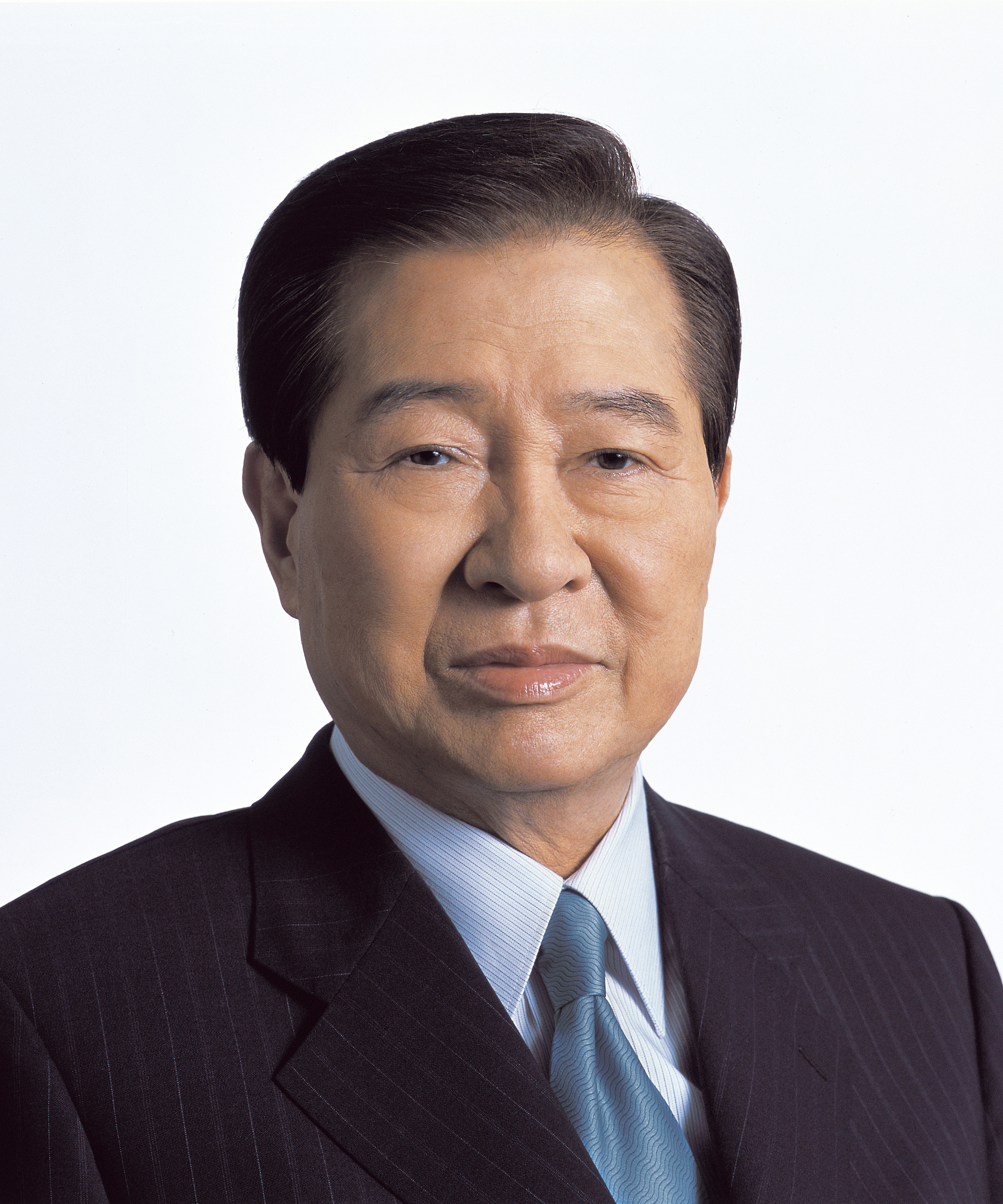
Kim Dae-jung

On August 8, 1973, the Korean Central Intelligence Agency (KCIA) kidnapped South Korean dissident leader and future president of South Korea Kim Dae-jung from a conference of Korean anti-authoritarian reformers in Tokyo, Japan.

== Background ==
In the 1971 South Korean presidential election, Kim represented the New Democratic Party, challenging incumbent President Park Chung Hee of the Democratic Republican Party. Kim won 45.3% of the popular vote but narrowly lost to Park's 53.2%, by about 900,000 votes. Following the election, Kim was involved in a car accident which left him with a permanent injury on his hip joint.

Believing the accident to be an attempt on his life, Kim fled to Japan where he eventually began an exile movement for democracy in South Korea, following Seoul's declaration of the Yushin Constitution in October 1972 while seeking medical treatment. With widespread allegations of corruption and manipulation of the results, Park turned his regime into a military dictatorship.

== Kidnapping ==
Around 11:00 am of August 8, 1973, Kim was attending a meeting with the leader of the Democratic Unification Party held in the Room 2211 of the Hotel Grand Palace in Tokyo. At around 1:19 pm, Kim was abducted by a group of unidentified men as he walked out of the room after the meeting. The entire rest of the floor of that hotel was rumored to have been rented out by a notorious yakuza syndicate run by the South Korean national Machii Hisayuki, a man long known to have extensive ties to the Korean Central Intelligence Agency (KCIA). He was then taken into the next door empty Room 2210 where he was drugged and fell unconscious. Kim was later moved to Osaka and later to Seoul, South Korea.

Kim's hands and feet were tied with weights while aboard the boat heading toward Korea, indicating that the kidnappers had intended to drown him by throwing him into the Sea of Japan. They were, however, forced to abandon this plan as the Japan Coast Guard began a pursuit of the kidnappers' boat, and they fired an illuminating shell just when the kidnappers brought Kim on the deck. Subsequently, Kim was released in Busan. He was found alive at his house in Seoul five days after the kidnapping.

According to some reports, Kim was only saved when U.S. Ambassador Philip Habib found out the KCIA was involved and intervened with the South Korean government. He mobilized senior embassy personnel to go around Seoul and speak to prominent Koreans who may have an idea on what happened to Kim Dae-jung without waiting for authorization from Washington, D.C., since doing so could get Kim killed before Habib was allowed to intervene.

== NIS inquiry ==
On October 24, 2007, following an internal inquiry, South Korea's National Intelligence Service (NIS) has admitted that its precursor, the KCIA, undertook the kidnapping, saying it had at least tacit backing from then-leader Park Chung Hee.

== Fiction ==
The film KT depicts the kidnapping of Kim Dae-jung.

== See also ==
- List of solved missing person cases (pre-1950)
