= Exile of Kim Dae-jung =

Kim Dae-jung, when he was an opposition leader before becoming President of South Korea, went into exile twice: first from 18 October 1972 to 8 August 1973, then from 23 December 1982 to 8 February 1985. Prior to his exile, Kim had been severely injured following an assassination attempt on 25 May 1971 and traveled to Japan for treatment. After the October Restoration established a military dictatorship under Park Chung-hee, Kim applied for asylum and did not return to South Korea.

During his first exile, Kim lived in Tokyo and toured the United States twice. He publicly opposed the Restoration in Japanese press and lobbied Japanese politicians across the political spectrum in support of democratizing South Korea. He continued this work during his tours of the US, organizing American politicians, Korean expatriates, and the general public to apply pressure on the Park regime. On 8 August 1973, Korean intelligence agents kidnapped Kim outside the Grand Palace Hotel in Tokyo and after failing to drown him, took him to Seoul. The Park administration placed Kim under house arrest after the US government intervened to ensure his survival.

For much of the next nine years, Kim remained under house arrest, and the South Korean government imprisoned him twice and even sentenced him to death. From early March 1976 to 27 December 1978, the Park administration jailed Kim for demanding that Park resign and that the Yushin Constitution he promulgated be abolished. In January 1980, the succeeding military dictatorship under Chun Doo-hwan lifted Kim's house arrest, only to arrest him during Chun's second coup on 17 May 1980. On 11 September 1980, the government sentenced Kim to death; this was eventually commuted to twenty years in prison after the intercessions of Pope John Paul II and the US government.

On 23 December 1982, after a two-week negotiation with Kim and his wife, the South Korean government suddenly and discreetly flew him and his family to Washington, DC. While in exile, Kim leveraged American press and mass media in his fight for democracy and against the military dictatorship. From mid-1983, he conducted related research at the Harvard Center for International Affairs as a visiting fellow. On 8 January 1985, he and his ally Kim Young-sam established the New Democratic Party of Korea. One month later, Kim Dae-jung, accompanied by an entourage of prominent Americans for his safety, returned to South Korea to assist in the legislative elections that year.

== First overseas exile and Tokyo kidnapping case ==
Due to the fatigue of the presidential and parliamentary campaigns and the worsening of his injuries after the attempted vehicular homicide, Kim was bedridden. The Park Chung-hee administration began to monitor Kim 24 hours a day, and including tapping his home phone. The houses around Kim's home were also rented by the authorities for surveillance, while his name began to disappear from newspapers, television and radio. On 17 October 1972, while Kim was receiving treatment for a hip injury in Japan, Park Chung-hee launched the October Restoration. Ten days later, Park Chung-hee promulgated the Yushin Constitution, changing the direct election of the president to an indirect election by the National Conference for Unification, and abolishing the term limits on the president. On 23 December, Park Chung-hee was elected in the eighth presidential election of South Korea as the only candidate. After careful consideration, Kim decided to apply for political asylum in Tokyo to seek intervention from the Japanese and American governments. On 18 October, Kim invited journalists from various countries to a press conference in Tokyo and wrote articles in several Japanese newspapers and media outlets to oppose Park's October Restoration.

In late 1972, Kim flew from Japan to the United States to lobby American politicians to put pressure on the situation in South Korea. Through introductions from two Harvard University professors, Kim met with several prominent American political figures, including Democratic Party senator Mike Mansfield, who later became the US Ambassador to Japan. He also gave speeches at several American universities, including Columbia University, Missouri State University, the University of Chicago, and the University of Washington, talking about the Yushin coup and calling on the United States to support South Korea's democratic struggle against Park Chung-hee. Reportedly, these universities received protest calls from the Korean Central Intelligence Agency, demanding that they not provide venues for Kim. On 5 January 1973, Kim returned to Japan from the United States. As in the US, Kim maintained extensive contact with members of both ruling and opposition parties in Japan, including Kakuei Tanaka, Takeo Fukuda, and Tomisaburo Hashimoto. During his exile in Japan, Kim published the book Dictatorship and My Struggle. On 6 March 1973, he came to the US for the second time and established a political organization with Korean expatriates in the US to develop democracy, oppose Park Chung-hee and promote national reunification, called the National Conference for the Restoration of Democracy and Promotion of Unification of Korea.

On 10 July 1973, Kim returned to Japan in order to establish the "Korean Democratic Unification Japan Headquarters". Kim Dae-jung's activities overseas angered Park Chung-hee. On 8 August 1973, Kim Dae-jung met with Yang Yi-tong, the president of the Democratic Party of Unification, who came to Japan from South Korea for medical treatment, at the Grand Palace Hotel in Tokyo. Since Yang Yi-tong and Kim Dae-jung were close friends, Yang Yi-tong was followed by South Korean agents on this trip. When Kim came out of Yang Yi-tong's room, he was kidnapped by five or six unidentified men in black sent by the Korean Central Intelligence Agency (KCIA). After being drugged, Kim was tied up and taken to the sea. He was almost drowned and was eventually kidnapped back to Seoul. Later, with the help of the American Central Intelligence Agency, Kim Dae-jung was released on 26 October, but was placed under house arrest. During this period, he was designated a prisoner of conscience by Amnesty International. Kim reflected on these events during his 2000 Nobel Peace Prize lecture:

I have lived, and continue to live, in the belief that God is always with me. I know this from experience. In August of 1973, while exiled in Japan, I was kidnapped from my hotel room in Tokyo by intelligence agents of the then military government of South Korea. The news of the incident startled the world. The agents took me to their boat at anchor along the seashore. They tied me up, blinded me, and stuffed my mouth. Just when they were about to throw me overboard, Jesus Christ appeared before me with such clarity. I clung to him and begged him to save me. At that very moment, an airplane was sent down from Heavens by the almighty God Himself to rescue me from the moment of death.

— Kim Dae-jung

Philip Habib, the US ambassador in Seoul, had interceded for him with the South Korean government; the "airplane" referred to was a patrol plane from the Japan Maritime Self-Defense Force which was tracking the kidnappers. In October 2007, the National Intelligence Service (NIS), successor to the KCIA, admitted that the KCIA carried out the plot. The NIS expressed its regret and had planned to kill and dump Kim into the sea. While the NIS panel said President Park "at least gave a passive approval", the panel added it could not prove Park directly ordered the kidnapping at the time. The kidnapping of Kim Dae-jung on Japanese soil was clearly an infringement on Japanese sovereignty. This matter has attracted much attention in Japan. However, the Park Chung-hee administration described the kidnapping of Kim Dae-jung as "a play written and directed by Kim Dae-jung himself". In order to quell Japanese public opinion, South Korean Prime Minister Kim Jong-pil visited Japan and expressed his apology to Japan. On 15 August 1974, South Korea's Liberation Day, Moon Se-gwang, a Japanese Korean who travelled to South Korea to assassinate Park Chung-hee, shot and killed Park's wife, Yuk Young-soo, at the National Theater in Jangchung-dong. This put Japan in an awkward position, and after that, Japan's investigation into the kidnapping of Kim Dae-jung was also left unresolved.

== Myeongdong Declaration of Democracy and National Salvation ==
Following the October Restoration military coup, opposition democratic forces suffered severe suppression under Park Chung-hee's dictatorial rule. After the abduction of Kim Dae-jung shocked the government and the public, the democratic camp began to challenge Park Chung-hee's reformist system. Various democratic parties issued declarations demanding the restoration of democracy. On 24 December 1973, the New Democratic Party led a petition campaign with one million signatures demanding constitutional revision. On 14 October 1974, the New Democratic Party, under the leadership of Kim Young-sam, published its "Outline for Constitutional Revision." In March 1975, opposition democratic leaders including Kim Young-sam, Yun Bo-sun, Kim Dae-jung, and Yang Yi-tong reached an agreement to unite opposition forces and form a democratic united front as soon as possible. In response, Park Chung-hee issued Emergency Measures Decree No. 9, comprehensively prohibiting all activities opposing the reformed constitution. In January 1976, the Republican Party indicted Kim Young-sam for violating Emergency Measures Decree No. 9 and expelled Kim Ok-sun, the executor of Kim Young-sam's policies, from the National Assembly. Emergency Measures Order No. 9 plunged the South Korean democracy movement into another low ebb.

On 1 March 1976, Kim Dae-jung, along with seventeen other leaders of the pro-democracy movement, jointly signed the "Declaration of Democracy for National Salvation" at the Myeongdong Cathedral in Seoul, demanding the resignation of Park Chung-hee and the abolition of the Yushin Constitution. Kim Dae-jung, along with Dr. Chung Il-hyung and others, also held a candlelight vigil in Myeongdong. Prior to this, Kim Dae-jung had told Cardinal Kim Soo-hwan that he was prepared to go to prison to awaken the Korean people. A few days later, the Park Chung-hee regime arrested eighteen pro-democracy activists who had signed the declaration on charges of violating Presidential Emergency Measures Order No. 9. Kim Dae-jung was accused of being the mastermind and sentenced to the maximum seven-year prison term. Following the arrests of these pro-democracy activists, demonstrations demanding their release were held by the public, including their families. The following year, the Supreme Court commuted Kim Dae-jung's sentence to five years in prison and deprived him of his political rights for five years. Meanwhile, Kim Hyung- wook, the former head of the Korean Central Intelligence Agency, who was in exile in the United States, revealed the truth about the 1973 kidnapping of Kim Dae-jung in the US Congress and listed the names of those involved in the kidnapping. On 6 July 1978, Park Chung-hee was elected in the ninth presidential election of South Korea by the "National Conference on Unification of the Mainland". He then granted Kim Dae-jung a pardon. On 27 December, Kim Dae-jung returned home after serving two years and nine months in prison, but was soon placed under house arrest by the military government.

== Death sentence ==
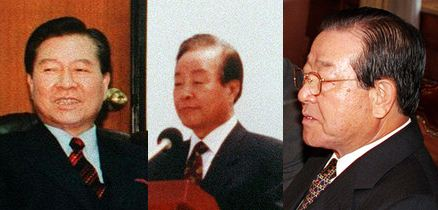
Kim Dae-jung, Kim Young-sam, and Kim Jong-pil are known as the "Three Kims" in South Korean politics

On 26 October 1979, after Park Chung-hee was assassinated, Seoul experienced a brief political spring. On 10 November, Acting President Choi Kyu-hah issued a "Special Statement" proposing that, in accordance with national law, a "National Assembly for the Unification of the Mainland" be held to indirectly elect a president within three months. The new president would listen to opinions from all sectors as quickly as possible, amend the Yushin Constitution, and then elect a president in accordance with the new constitution. Choi Kyu-hah's speech was supported by the US government. The transitional government quickly lifted a series of emergency measures issued by Park Chung-hee. All sectors of the government and the public also began to prepare for the 1980 presidential election. Two months later, Kim Dae-jung's house arrest was lifted, while his citizenship was restored on 1 March 1980.

On 12 December 1979, Chun Doo-hwan launched a military coup, seizing control of the military and establishing a caretaker cabinet under Choi Kyu-hah. In May 1980, the three Kims who led the democracy movement, university students, and the public engaged in a life-or-death struggle with Chun's military forces. Protests demanding the abolition of the Yushin Movement and Chun's resignation continued to erupt in Seoul. On 17 May, Chun launched another military coup. Government buildings, the National Assembly building, news agencies, and universities in Seoul were occupied by the military. Kim Dae-jung and Kim Jong-pil were arrested, Kim Young-sam was placed under house arrest, and hundreds of other democracy activists were arrested. The military imposed martial law nationwide. South Korea's democratic development process once again entered a period of hardship. The day after Kim Dae-jung's arrest, the Gwangju Uprising erupted in Gwangju. On 11 September, Kim Dae-jung was sentenced to death by a military court on two charges: "conspiracy to instigate the Gwangju Uprising" and "chief culprit of an anti-national group" that organized the "Unification of the Republic of Korea" overseas after the 1972 October Restoration coup. Kim Dae-jung appealed. Pope John Paul II sent a letter to South Korean President Chun Doo-hwan on 11 December 1980, asking for clemency for Kim, a Catholic, then on the 13th, US Defense Secretary Harold Brown warned the Chun regime, that the execution would have a "very significant" impact upon US-Korean relations.

In January 1981, his appeal was rejected by the Supreme Court. Under pressure from the United States, however, Kim Dae-jung's sentence was eventually commuted to life imprisonment. After the sentence was changed to life imprisonment, Kim Dae-jung was transferred from the army prison to Cheongju Prison. During his imprisonment, Kim Dae-jung's wife wrote, totaling 640 letters over two years. His sons also wrote him more than 200 letters. However, the prison did not allow the retention of letters, and letters and photos from family members were confiscated after being viewed. According to prison regulations, Kim Dae-jung could only send one postcard per month at most. To this end, Kim Dae-jung began to practice writing small characters on both sides of the postcards. He once wrote a letter of more than 20,000 words on a postcard sent to his family. In 1983, these letters of Kim Dae-jung were compiled into a book called With the Regret of the Nation and published in the United States. Later, it was translated into Japanese and published in Japan under the title Letters from Prison. In 1984, the book was published in South Korea under the title Letters from Prison of Kim Dae-jung.

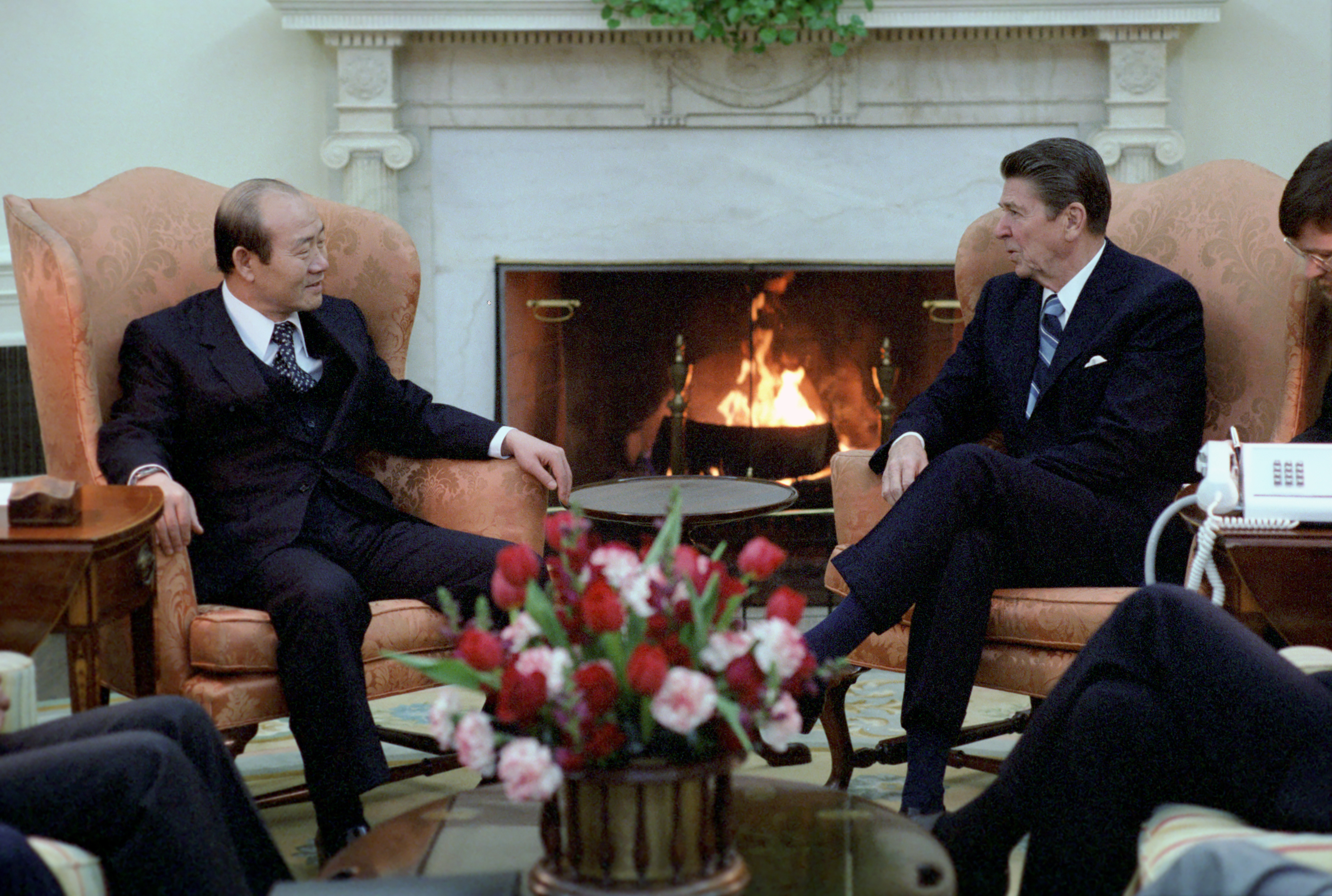
President Chun Doo-hwan visiting US President Ronald Reagan at the White House in February 1981. Reagan invited Chun, in exchange for Chun commuting Kim Dae-jung's death sentence.

American intelligence understood that Chun wanted Kim's execution to take place during the US presidential transition between the outgoing president Jimmy Carter and president-elect Ronald Reagan. The outgoing Carter Administration, which had poor relations with the South Korean government, asked Reagan's incoming National Security Advisor Richard V. Allen to intervene. Allen, not wanting the Reagan Administration to be blamed for the execution, told Chun that Reagan was opposed to Kim's execution. Allen asked for Kim's sentence to be commuted, and Chun, who was eager to seek American acceptance of his rule following the 1980 coup, accepted in exchange for an invitation to be one of the first foreign leaders to visit the new Reagan Administration at the White House in February 1981. Kim's sentence was commuted to 20 years in prison.

== Second overseas exile ==
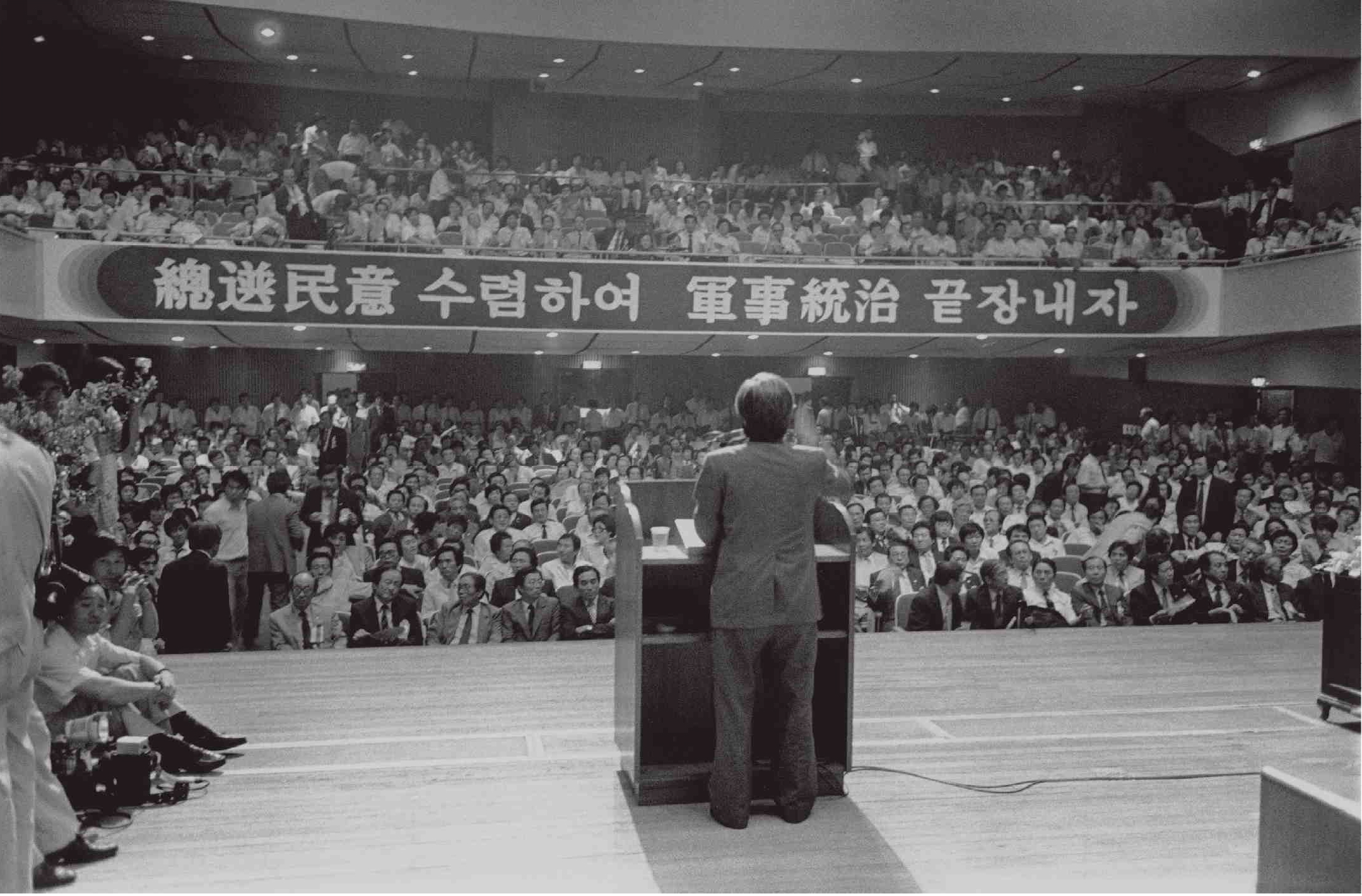
The Shinhan Democratic Party holding its founding ceremony in Seoul.

On 10 December 1982, an official came to ask Kim Dae-jung if he was willing to go to the United States for medical treatment. Considering that some people were still imprisoned because of him, Kim Dae-jung refused the suggestion. Later, Kim Dae-jung and his wife reached a compromise with Noh Shin-yong, the Minister of National Security Planning, and agreed to go to the United States on the condition that those imprisoned because of Kim Dae-jung be released. On 23 December, Kim Dae-jung and his family were suddenly informed by the authorities to leave the country immediately. In order to avoid the news media, the authorities arranged for Kim Dae-jung and his family to get their passports and tickets in the cabin. The deputy warden of Cheongju Prison also announced the termination of Kim Dae-jung's sentence in the cabin. After arriving at Dulles International Airport in Washington, D.C., Kim Dae-jung was welcomed by more than 300 supporters. He made an impromptu statement to reporters at the airport. Congressman Edward Kennedy held a welcome party for Kim Dae-jung in Washington.

During his exile in the United States, Kim Dae-jung actively engaged in various activities against military dictatorship and to promote the democratization of South Korea. He frequently appeared on local television and radio programs on ABC, NBC, and Public Radio, which made the American public more aware of and concerned about the democratization of South Korea. In July 1983, Kim Dae-jung also established the "Institute for Korean Human Rights Issues". On 17 May 1983, the third anniversary of the Gwangju Uprising, Kim Young-sam launched an indefinite hunger strike to resist Chun Doo-hwan's dictatorship. After learning about this, Kim Dae-jung published an article in The New York Times in support of Kim Young-sam. He also organized Korean expatriates in the United States to hold demonstrations in Washington and New York and other places, and held a rally to support Kim Young-sam. This hunger strike also united the democratic forces of Kim Young-sam and Kim Dae-jung in South Korea. In May 1984, the "Association for the Promotion of Democracy" was established. Kim Dae-jung and Kim Young-sam were elected as the presidents of the association. On 8 January 1985, the two sides established the New Democratic Party of Korea.

Six months after arriving in the United States, Kim Dae-jung became a visiting fellow at the Harvard Center for International Affairs, where he conducted related research. During his period abroad, he authored a number of opinion pieces in leading western newspapers that were sharply critical of the South Korean government. On 30 March 1983, Kim presented a speech on human rights and democracy at Emory University in Atlanta, Georgia and accepted an honorary Doctor of Laws degree by the institution. During his time at Harvard, he also met the Philippine opposition leader, Ninoy Aquino, and his wife, Corazon Aquino. At that time, Kim Dae-jung proposed to Aquino to jointly establish an Asian democratic cause organization. However, on 21 August 1983, Aquino was brutally murdered by the Marcos authorities in the Philippines when he returned home.
