= 1973 South Korean legislative election =

- Directly elected members
- 27 February 1973

146 of the 219 seats in the National Assembly 110 seats needed for a majority
- Turnout: 71.36% (▼1.86pp)
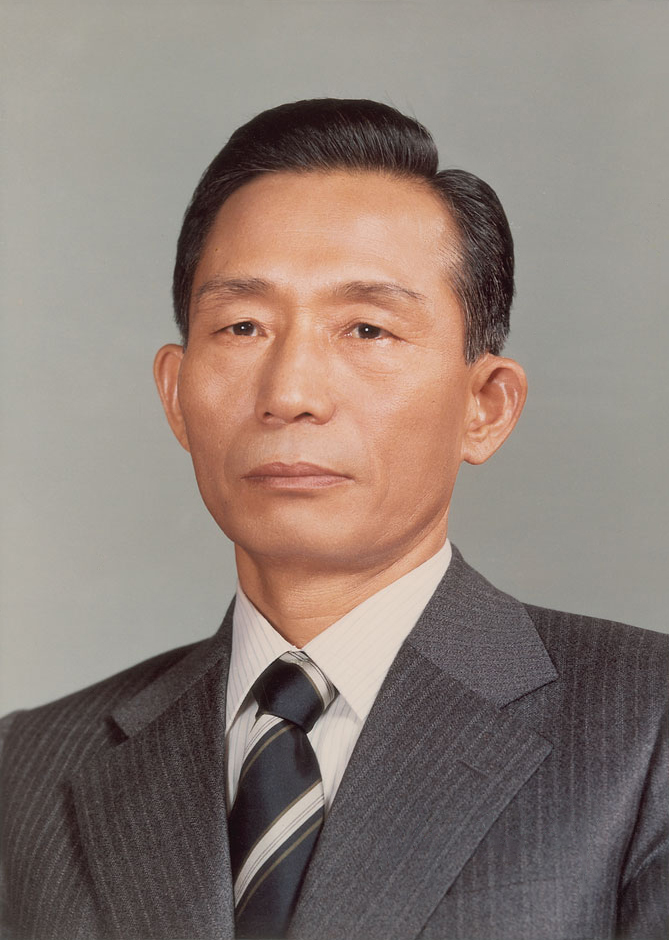

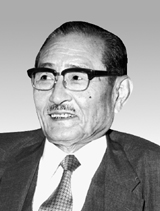

	Majority party	Minority party	Third party
Leader	Park Chung Hee	Yu Chin-san	Yang il-dong
Party	Democratic Republican	New Democratic	Democratic Unification
Last election	113 seats	89 seats	Did not exist
Seats won	73	52	3
Seat change	▼40	▼37	New
Popular vote	4,251,754	3,577,300	1,114,204
Percentage	38.68%	32.55%	10.14%
Swing	▼10.09pp	▼11.83pp	New
- Presidential appointees
- 7 March 1973
- 73 seats of the National Assembly for Presidential appointees
Party	Leader	Vote %	Seats	+/–
Independents	Park Chung Hee	96.49	73	New
This lists parties that won seats. See the complete results below.
Speaker before	Speaker after
None (Note: The National Assembly was abolished due to Park Chung Hee's self-coup. Paik Too-chin (Democratic Republican) was Speaker at the moment of the abolition.)	Chung Il-kwon; Democratic Republican

Legislative elections were held in South Korea on 27 February 1973 to elect 146 members of the National Assembly. Another 73 members appointed by President Park Chung-hee were indirectly elected by the National Conference for Unification on 7 March 1973.

The result was a supermajority victory for the ruling Democratic Republican Party, which won 73 of the 146 elected seats in the National Assembly along with the 73 seats filled by Park's appointees. Voter turnout was 73%.

The election reconstituted the National Assembly after Park had dissolved it in the October Restoration self-coup four months earlier and pushed through a constitutional referendum which removed presidential term limits and gave him the power to appoint one-third of the National Assembly. The opposition New Democratic Party had also split in 1972 over a leadership dispute between the Yu Chin-san faction and an opposing faction led by Kim Dae-jung and Kim Hong-il. One month before the election, the latter formed the Democratic Unification Party. However, the DUP performed poorly and split the opposition vote, and in the aftermath the members expressed regret for their decision to run.

== Electoral system ==
Two-thirds of the seats were elected from two-member constituencies via single non-transferable vote. The remaining one-third of the seats were presidential appointees, nominated by president Park and confirmed by the National Conference for Unification elected in 1972.

== Results ==
Graph of the party split among 219 seats.
Party	Votes	%	Seats	+/–
Democratic Republican Party	4,251,754	38.68	73	–40
New Democratic Party	3,577,300	32.55	52	–37
Democratic Unification Party	1,114,204	10.14	2	New
Independents	2,048,178	18.63	19	New
Presidential appointees			73	New
Total	10,991,436	100.00	219	+15
Valid votes	10,991,436	98.17		
Invalid/blank votes	205,048	1.83		
Total votes	11,196,484	100.00		
Registered voters/turnout	15,690,130	71.36		
Source: Nohlen et al.

=== By city/province ===
Region	Total seats	Seats won			
Region	Total seats	DRP	NDP	DUP	Ind.
Seoul	16	7	8	0	1
Busan	8	4	4	0	0
Gyeonggi	16	9	6	0	1
Gangwon	10	5	3	0	2
North Chungcheong	8	5	2	0	1
South Chungcheong	14	6	6	0	2
North Jeolla	12	4	4	0	4
South Jeolla	20	10	6	2	2
North Gyeongsang	22	12	5	0	5
South Gyeongsang	18	10	8	0	0
Jeju	2	1	0	0	1
Total	146	73	52	2	19

=== Presidential appointees ===
On 7 March 1973, the National Conference for Unification indirectly elected 73 members of the National Assembly appointed by President Park Chung-hee. The number of delegates present was 2,354, with 2,251 delegates approving the election of Park's appointees.

Party	Votes	%	Seats
Presidential appointees	2,251	96.49	73
Against	82	3.51	–
Total	2,333	100.00	73
Valid votes	2,333	99.11	
Invalid/blank votes	21	0.89	
Total votes	2,354	100.00	
Registered voters/turnout	2,359	99.79	
Source: Naver News Library

==== By city/province ====
Region	Votes			Delegates		
Region	For	Against	Invalid	Voted	Absent	Total
Seoul	299	2	0	301	2	303
Busan	95	7	1	103	1	104
Gyeonggi	274	4	2	280	0	280
Gangwon	135	10	0	145	0	145
North Chungcheong	125	2	0	127	0	127
South Chungcheong	226	5	0	231	0	231
North Jeolla	187	10	3	200	0	200
South Jeolla	297	11	3	311	1	312
North Gyeongsang	335	13	5	353	1	354
South Gyeongsang	253	18	7	278	0	278
Jeju	25	0	0	25	0	25
Total	2,251	82	21	2,354	5	2,359
Source: Naver News Library
