= Democratic Youth League Incident =

1974 South Korean political movement

The Democratic Youth League Incident was an incident in which 180 people, primarily members of the National Federation of Democratic Youth and Students, were arrested by the National Intelligence Service and criminally charged in an emergency court martial, as a result of emergency measures issued by the South Korean Restoration Regime in April 1974.

On 2 November 2004, the National Intelligence Service launched the Development Committee for Investigating the Truth of Past Incidents (chaired by Oh Chung-il) to uncover the truth of the Democratic Youth League Incident, among others. On 7 December 2005, the results of this investigation were announced, stating that the Democratic Youth League Incident had been a fabrication directed by President Park Chung-hee.^{a}

== Overview ==
The Restoration Regime, established by President Park Chung-hee in 1972, faced largely negative public sentiment domestically, exacerbated by the kidnapping of Kim Dae-jung that occurred in Tokyo, Japan in August 1973. In October that year, anti-dictatorship and anti-establishment movements spread throughout the nation, beginning with an anti-Restoration demonstration by students of the arts and sciences departments at Seoul National University. Following this, in December of the same year, the “One Million Signatures Campaign for Constitutional Reformation” was launched, led by more than 30 independent figures such as Chang Chun-ha and Beak Gi-wan.

Furthermore, in January 1974, 61 intellectuals—including the writer Lee Hee-seung—signed a “Declaration in Support of Constitutional Reform,” while a larger group of intellectuals, religious figures, and opposition figures launched a full-scale signature campaign for constitutional reform, calling for the restoration of democratic constitutional government and denouncing the Democratic Republican government’s oppression of human rights. For that reason, on 8 January that year, Park Chung-hee announced Emergency Measures No. 1 and No. 2, simultaneously prohibiting all discussion of constitutional reform and establishing emergency courts-martial.

However, even after the official proclamation of the emergency measures, a secret campaign for constitutional reform continued. This occurred through underground activities such as the publication of illicit student newspapers, the coordination of temporary leaves of absence by student groups, and the adoption of a declaration on the current situation by intellectuals and religious leaders. Therefore, on 3 April 1974, Park Chung-hee announced Emergency Measure No. 4, which banned all collective activities connected to the Democratic Youth League and other student organizations, and declared that the Youth League was being manipulated by “nonconformist forces” (forces that do not form with the national order of South Korea).

On 25 April 1974, the Korean Central Intelligence Agency (KCIA) announced the status of its criminal investigation into the Democratic Youth League Incident. According to the KCIA announcement, the leadership of the Democratic Youth League aimed to establish a laborers’ and farmers’ government in South Korea through a “four-stage revolution,” and were planning to assume national leadership as a transitional system of government. At the same time, the KCIA also claimed that the Democratic Youth League—which was supposedly plotting to overthrow the Korean government—was behind the anti-government movement, in collusion with the General Association of Korean Residents in Japan (Chongryon), the People’s Revolutionary Party, and the Japanese Communist Party.

Ultimately, a total of 1024 people—including students—were subject to investigation in connection with this incident, and 180 of them were prosecuted by courts-martial. Moreover, among the KCIA’s series of operations cracking down on individuals involved with the incident, the case involving 23 people affiliated with the People’s Revolutionary Party is specifically known as the People’s Revolutionary Party Reconstruction Committee Incident.

The first trial of Democratic Youth League affiliates began on 5 June 1974, and though Lee Cheol and Kim Chi-ha were initially given the death penalty, their sentences were later commuted to life imprisonment. However, eight out of the 23 people associated with the People’s Revolutionary Party actually were executed, the chief leadership of the Democratic Youth League were all given life sentences, and the other suspects were given heavy prison sentences of 15 to 20 years.

In addition, former President Yun Po-sun, Bishop Daniel Tji Hak-soun, Pastor Park Hyeong-gyu, Professor Kim Dong-gil, and Professor Kim Chan-guk were all found guilty on suspicion of providing behind-the-scenes support to the Democratic Youth League. The journalist Tachikawa Masaki, who was arrested while covering the incident, and his interpreter, Seoul National University graduate student Hayakawa Yoshiharu (later a professor at Ferris University), were also given heavy sentences of 20 years for crimes such as inciting rebellion. Although the arrest and trial of Japanese people temporarily became a diplomatic issue between Japan and South Korea, ultimately, through a special presidential measure on 15 February 1975, the executions of most prisoners were halted—with the exception of some People’s Revolutionary Party affiliates—and the Japanese prisoners were released.

On 27 January 2010, the retrial of Tachikawa Masaki’s case was held at the Seoul Central District Court, and the court acquitted him. Furthermore, in January 2013, Kim Chi-ha was also found not guilty.

== Footnotes ==
a. On the same day, the National Intelligence Service also announced the results of its investigation in the first People's Revolutionary Party Incident in 1964 and the second People's Revolutionary Party Incident in 1975, likewise declaring that they had been fabricated at the direction of President Park Chung-hee.
