= South Korean National Liberation Front Preparation Committee =

1976–1979 organization in South Korea

- 남조선민족해방전선준비위원회 南朝鮮民族解放戰線準備委員會
- Flag of the South Korean National Liberation Front Preparation Committee
- Dates active: 1976–1979
- Active regions: South Korea
- Ideology: Socialism; Juche; Anti-Imperialism; Anti-revisionism; Korean Reunification; Korean nationalism
- Wars: Korean conflict

The South Korean National Liberation Front Preparation Committee (Korean: 남조선민족해방전선준비위원회) was a left-wing and Pro-North Korea organization in South Korea active from 1976 to 1979.

The South Korean National Liberation Front Preparation Committee was created by South Korean leftists in order to propagate socialist and communist ideas to the South Korean masses. The eventual goal of the SKNLF-PC was to organize the South Korean people and wage a guerrilla war similar to that of the National Liberation Front (Viet Cong) in South Vietnam, hoping to eventually create a socialist state and reunify with North Korea. The South Korean National Liberation Front was dissolved after many members were exposed and arrested by the South Korean military regime, including poet Kim Nam-ju. The National Liberation Front Incident is often compared to other instances where the South Korean state exposed (or at least claimed to have exposed) clandestine communist organizations, such as the Revolutionary Reunification Party Incident and the People's Revolutionary Party Incident.

The flag of the South Korean National Liberation Front was based on the flag of North Korea. It closely resembled the way the flag of Viet Cong was modified from the flag of North Vietnam. However, while Viet Cong's affiliations successfully established a formal competing government in South Vietnam (Provisional Revolutionary Government of the Republic of South Vietnam) with a nominal armed wing (Liberation Army of South Vietnam) that actually took power in Southern Vietnam after a series of victorious campaigns that led to the Fall of Saigon, the North Korean-led counterpart could never establish any considerable resistance in Southern Korea and ended up being disbanded.

== See also ==
- People's Revolutionary Party Incident, related incidents in the past
- National Liberation Front of South Vietnam
  - People's Revolutionary Party in South Vietnam
