= Yu Chin-san =

South Korean politician (1905–1974)

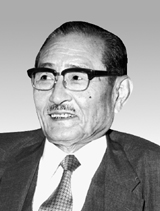

Personal details
- Born: Yu Yeong-pil; 18 October 1905 Jinsan County, North Jeolla Province, Korean Empire
- Died: 28 April 1974 (aged 68) Seoul, South Korea

Korean name
- Hangul: 유영필
- Hanja: 柳永弼
- RR: Yu Yeongpil
- MR: Yu Yŏngp'il

Art name
- Hangul: 옥계
- Hanja: 玉溪
- RR: Okgye
- MR: Okkye

Pen name
- Hangul: 유진산
- Hanja: 柳珍山
- RR: Yu Jinsan
- MR: Yu Chinsan

Yu Chin-san (Korean: 유진산; Hanja: 柳珍山; 18 October 1905 – 28 April 1974) was a South Korean independence activist and politician active from the start of the First Republic through the first half of the Fourth Republic. His clan name is Munhwa Ryu, and he was born with the name Youngpil (영필; 永弼) but adopted the name Chin-san and the art name Okgye (옥계; 玉溪) later in life.

The name Chin-san uses the same characters as that of his birthplace, Jinsan, in the Geumsan County of South Chungcheong Province. Chin-san’s son, Yu Han-yeol, was also a politician and served consecutive terms in the National Assembly (as a member of the Democratic Korea Party, the New Korea Party, and the Liberty Korea Party). Additionally, the former National Assembly member Seong Nak-hyeon was married to Chin-san’s niece.

== Overview ==
Yu Chin-san entered politics as a part of the youth movement immediately following Korean liberation in 1945, and held key positions in several conservative opposition parties (including the Democratic Nationalist Party, the Democratic Party, the Civil Rule Party, the People's Party, and the New Democratic Party) from the time of the First Republic to the Fourth Republic. Because he adopted a moderate viewpoint aimed at dialogue and compromise, Chin-san was ridiculed as a shill by hard-line opponents of the government within the confrontational opposition camps to which he belonged.

== Biography ==
=== Early life and education ===
On 18 October 1905, Yu Chin-san was born into a poor farming family in Eupnae Village, in the Dansan Township of Jinsan County, a part of the North Jeolla Province.^{a} He was enrolled at Jinsan Primary School in Geumsan County in 1912, and six years later, in order to enroll in Gyeongseong General Secondary School, Chin-san’s whole family moved to Gyeongseong together (present-day Seoul).

In May 1919, Chin-san actively participated in the March First Movement, a significant anti-Japanese protest in Korea. A year later, he was expelled from school after posting posters critical of Japan on-campus in connection with this movement. He then transferred to Bo-seong General Secondary School, where he graduated in 1923.

In 1924, Chin-san travelled to Japan and matriculated at Waseda University Junior and Senior High School. Four years later, after his graduation, he matriculated at the Waseda University School of Political Science and Economics. In his third-year at Waseda, Chin-san was imprisoned in Ichigaya Prison when the activities of his student organization, the Emerging Science Research Society, came under police suspicion. As a result, he returned to Korea without graduating. After his return, he organized the Futaba Farmer’s Association and built up a peasant movement, but ultimately fled to China when he became a target for surveillance by the Japanese police.

=== Early political activities ===
In Shanghai in 1933, Chin-san was appointed as a liaison to the Korean Provisional Government (KPG). A year later, Chin-san was seized by Japanese authorities and repatriated to Korea two months after organizing a Korean association in Nanchang, the capital of Jiangxi Province. Back in Korea, he was imprisoned within Seodaemun Prison for four months. In 1935, he participated in the editing of the Farmer’s Reader, and led the peasant movement alongside Jeon Jin-han and Kim-san. Throughout this period, he made connections with Chough Pyung-ok, Chang Taek-sang, and Baek Gwan-su.

After the restoration of Korean independence in 1945, Chin-san organized the right-wing youth group, Heungguksa, and disbanded the left-wing Youth League for the Promotion of the Founding of the Korean Nation. He also participated in an operation to deploy Youth League members to Pyongyang in order to remove Kim Il-sung and Kang Ryang-uk, and at some point became involved with the right-wing White Shirts Society. In October that year, Chin-san founded the Korean Reformation Youth League, and was installed as its chairman.^{b} Two months later, he led the Reformation Youth League to participate in the Korean National Youth Federation for the Promotion of Independence and was later installed as the Federation’s vice-chairman.

Throughout the next several years, Chin-san served in leadership roles for a variety of different youth organizations. For example, in April 1946, Chin-san founded the Korean Democratic Youth Alliance and served as its president; its Honorary Chairman was Rhee Syngman. In July 1947, he was named Chairman of the General Association of Korean Youth, and in December 1948, he became Supreme Leader of the Korean Youth League. He also served as a member of the Special Investigation Committee of Anti-National Activities in 1949, but the organization was soon disbanded.

=== Political career ===
In 1950, Chin-san ran for the National Assembly in the newly established Republic of Korea but was unsuccessful. Nevertheless, he was selected as the Director of General Affairs for the Democratic National Party the next year. In June 1952, he was arrested for his participation in the Assembly for the Declaration of Constitutional Protection and National Salvation, which protested the Busan Political Turmoil of the prior month. However, this did not stop him from being elected to the National Assembly for the first just two years later, as an independent candidate in Geumsan County for the 1954 legislative election.

In 1955, following the founding of the united opposition party, the Democratic Party, Chin-san was made its first Chief of Labor. Within the party, he became affiliated with the old-school faction drawn from the former Korea Democratic Party. Three years later, in the 1958 legislative election, he was re-elected as a Democratic Party candidate in Geumsan County, and was made the floor leader of the party. In April 1960, Chin-san challenged the Chang Myon regime, which had been established following the April Revolution, and thus split the new and old factions of the Democratic Party into two conservative parties. After which, he was elected for the third time in the 1960 legislative election, again as a Democratic Party candidate in Geumsan.

At the beginning of 1961, Yu Chin-san was named Secretary General of the New Democratic Party (1960-61).^{c} The party was formed from the old-school faction that had seceded from the then-ruling Democratic Party of the Second Republic. Later that year, the May 16 coup occurred. That June, Chin-san was apprehended by the military police and imprisoned in Mapo Prison on suspicions surrounding the source of political funds for Oh Wi-young, a powerful figure behind the new faction in the Democratic Party.

In March 1962, the Supreme Council for National Reconstruction enacted the Political Purification Law, under which Yu Chin-san, along with others, was subject to a ban on political activity. That month, Chin-san spearheaded the Assembly for the Declaration of Democratic National Salvation, in opposition to Park Chung-hee’s 22 March declaration extending military rule.

The next year, in May, the Civil Rule Party was formed, and Chin-san endorsed Kim Byeong-ro as its party leader. In the 1963 legislative election, he was then elected for the third time, as a national candidate for the new Civil Rule Party. However, Chin-san later clashed with the party leader, Yun Po-sun, over the National Assembly’s passage of the Bill for an Ethics Committee on Speech in August 1964. On 23 August, the Civil Rule Party’s Supervisory Committee thus decided upon the expulsion of Yu Chin-san. Chin-san fought back against this decision in court, and won his reinstatement on 26 November.

Despite this, just a year later, in May 1965, Chin-san participated in the founding of the united opposition party, the 1965 People's Party, and was installed as its vice president the following year. This party was short lived, however, as in February 1967, a new united opposition party, the New Democratic Party, was founded, and Chin-san was installed as its vice president. That June, during the 1967 legislative election, Chin-san was elected for the fifth time, this time as a New Democratic Party candidate in Yeongdeungpo District.

In January 1970, Chin-san was elected as president of the New Democratic Party at the party convention. That August, he had his first one-on-one meeting with Park Chung-hee. In May the next year, Chin-san was elected to the National Assembly for his sixth term, in the 1971 legislative elections, as a national candidate for the New Democratic Party. His switch to the national constituency just before the election drove the party’s internal conflicts to the surface, prompting him to resign as the New Democratic Party’s president.

However, in September 1972, Chin-san was (again) elected as party president at the National Convention for the New Democratic Party. A year later, he was elected for the seventh and final time in the 1973 legislative election, in the combined constituency of Geumsan County, Daedok District, and Yeongi County as a New Democratic Party candidate. Later that year, he had another one-on-one meeting with Park Chung-hee.

In 1974, Chin-san declared a campaign to amend the Restoration Constitution, but on 23 April that year he died of colorectal cancer.

== Popular culture ==
- Portrayed by Shim Yang-hong in the 1981–82 TV series, 1st Republic.
- Portrayed by Lee Hyo-jung in the 2002–2003 SBS TV series Rustic Period.

== See also ==
- Kim Du-han
- Kim Ku
- Kim Won-bong

== Footnotes ==
a. Later, Jinsan County was merged with Geumsan County in North Jeolla Province, and control over the county was transferred to South Chungcheong Province in the 1960s. It is now Jinsan Township, Geumsan County, in South Chungcheong Province

b. The Korean Reformation Youth League was a youth group that originated as an organization for escorting important individuals. It was first organized through the Special Envoy Office of the Korean Provisional Government, a local office established by the provisional government, which was based in Chongqing, China at the time, in preparation for its return to Korea. The Reformation Youth League became one of the most powerful youth organizations at the time, not including the left-leaning People’s Republic of Korea youth groups.

c. This is a separate political party from the New Democratic Party that was the largest opposition party during the Third and Fourth Republics.
