= Ham Seok-heon =

South Korean activist (1901–1989)

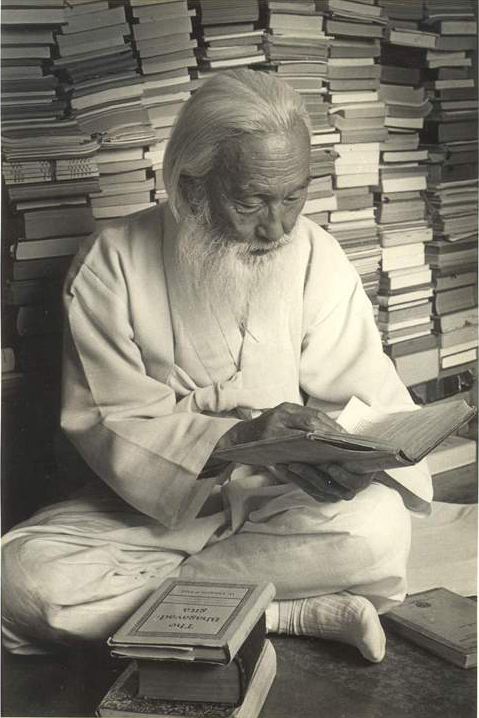
- Born: March 13, 1901; Yomju County, North Pyongan Province, Korean Empire
- Died: February 4, 1989 (aged 87)
- Occupations: Author, poet, religious evangelist

Korean name
- Hangul: 함석헌
- Hanja: 咸錫憲
- RR: Ham Seokheon
- MR: Ham Sŏkhŏn

Ham Seok-heon (Korean: 함석헌; Hanja: 咸錫憲; 13 March 1901 – 4 February 1989) was a notable figure in the Religious Society of Friends (Quaker) movement in Korea, and was nicknamed the "Gandhi of Korea." Ham was an important Asian voice for human rights and non-violence during the 20th century, despite numerous imprisonments for his convictions. He was a Quaker who concluded that all religions are on common ground in terms of human beings, a view shared by many Quakers.

He encouraged peace and democracy and promoted non-violence movement known as "seed idea" (ssi-al sasang), consistently present in his books Korean History Seen through a Will published in 1948, Human Revolution in 1961, History and People in 1964, and Queen of Suffering: a spiritual history of Korea edited in 1985. He was also a poet and wrote about 120 poems such as "Song of the West Wind" written in 1983. In 2000, Ham was selected by the Republic of Korea as a national cultural figure.

== Early life ==
Ham was born in Yomju County, North Pyongan Province, Korean Empire (now in North Korea) and grew up as a Presbyterian. In 1919, he joined the March First Movement. He lost his place in Pyongyang Public High School. In 1923 he graduated from Osan High School and went to Japan to study to become a teacher. There he first encountered the Non-Church movement, an indigenous Japanese Christian movement that had no liturgy, sacraments or ordained clergy. He spoke out against social injustices and advocated pacifism.

== Biography ==
- March 13, 1901: Born in Yomju County, North Pyongan Province, Korean Empire
- 1906: Entered Deokil Elementary School, a missionary school
- 1914: Graduated from Deokil Elementary School
- 1916: Graduated from Yangshi Public Elementary School and entered Pyongyang public high school
- 1919: After protesting against the Japanese colonial regime in Korea, quit Pyongyang public high school
- 1923: Graduated from Osan high school and went to Japan to study education in Tokyo
- 1924–1928: Studied the bible under Uchimura Kanzo with Kim Gyoshin and Song Duyong
- 1928: Graduated from Tokyo School of Education
- 1928–1938: Taught history and ethics at Osan high school
- 1934: Published "Korean History Seen through a Will" in Seongseo Joseon magazine
- 1938: After protesting against the Japanese colonial regime in Korea, quit working as a teacher at Osan high school
- 1940–1941: After working at Songsan agricultural & educational school, imprisoned as a protester against the Japanese colonial regime at the behest of the Japanese
- 1942–1943: After writing several articles against the Japanese colonial regime in Korea for a monthly magazine, Seongseo Joseon (Bible and Korea), imprisoned at Seodaemun prison
- 1945: Appointed as a minister of education for Northern Pyongan province
- 1947: Imprisoned as an organizer of student protests against the Soviets (framed by the Soviets)
- 1956: Criticized social and political problems in an editorial paper, Sasang-gye
- 1958: Imprisoned for writing an article, "Must be a Thinking People to Live," which criticized the autocratic regime, and began his religious career as a Korean representative of the Quakers
- 1961–1963: Studied at the Quaker schools Pendle Hill in the US and Woodbrooke in Britain
- 1963: Protested against General Park Chung Hee becoming a candidate for the presidency
- 1965: Protested against president Park Chung Hee for his attempt at an alliance with the former Japanese regime
- 1974: Convicted after protesting against President Park Chung Hee for his attempt to change the constitution to be elected again
- 1979: Nominated for the Nobel Peace Prize by the American Friends Service Committee
- 1985: Nominated again for the Nobel Peace Prize by the American Friends Service Committee
- 1987: Received first Inchon Award, given to a person who contributed to the development of the press and media
- February 4, 1989: Died in Seoul National University Hospital
- 2002: Posthumously received the "Accolade for Founding a Nation" as a sign of recognition from the nation

== Bibliography ==
- Kim Sung-soo, Biography of a Korean Quaker, Ham Seok-heon, Seoul: Samin Books, 2001, 360 pp. ISBN 978-89-87519-49-4

== See also ==
- Christianity in Korea
