= Intra-Parliamentary Bargaining Group =

An intra-parliamentary bargaining group is a parliamentary caucus within the House of Councillors that has the right to raise representative questions during plenary sessions of the National Diet.

== Overview ==
The requirement to qualify as an intra-parliamentary bargaining group is that the caucus consist of five or more Diet members during ordinary Diet sessions, and ten or more Diet members during extraordinary Diet sessions and special Diet sessions. Only parliamentary bargaining groups that satisfy these criteria are permitted to present directors to the Diet Committee on Rules and Administration.

As of 2014 (Heisei 26), participation in party leader debates is also effectively limited to the representatives of intra-parliamentary bargaining groups. The Japanese Communist Party and the Social Democratic Party, among others, are demanding the rescission of this policy, claiming the restriction to be unfair. However, when the party leader debates first began, the rule limiting participation to the party leaders of intra-parliamentary bargaining groups had not yet been established, and the only opposition party caucus with under ten members was the Second Chamber Club (Dainiin Club). Thus, neither party made such demands until after their membership fell below ten members later on. As a result, there are those among the ruling party who see this as a purely self-centered demand. Incidentally, in 2013 (Heisei 25), the Japanese Communist Party regained their status as an intra-parliamentary bargaining group after securing 11 seats during the 23rd regular House of Councillors election.
