= Third Republic of Korea =

Government of South Korea from 1963 to 1972

Coordinates: 37°35′N 127°0′E

Republic of Korea 대한민국 大韓民國
- 1963–1972
- Flag Coat of arms
- Anthem: 애국가 "Aegukga"
- National seal "국새"

- Capital: Seoul
- Common languages: Korean
- Government: Unitary presidential republic under an authoritarian (Note: Has been described as totalitarian or authoritarian by multiple sources.) military dictatorship
- President
  - 1963–1972: Park Chung Hee
- Prime Minister
  - 1963–1964: Choi Tu-son
  - 1964–1970: Chung Il-kwon
  - 1970–1971: Baek Du-jin
  - 1971–1972: Kim Jong-pil
- Legislature: National Assembly
- Historical era: Cold War
  - Established: 17 December 1963
  - 1972 South Korean constitutional referendum: 21 November 1972
- Currency: Won
| Preceded by | Succeeded by |
| Supreme Council for National Reconstruction | Fourth Republic of Korea |
- Today part of: South Korea

The Third Republic of Korea (Korean: 제3공화국; RR: Je sam gonghwaguk; lit. 'Third Republic') was the government of South Korea from 17 December 1963 to 21 November 1972. The Third Republic was founded on the dissolution of the Supreme Council for National Reconstruction that overthrew the Second Republic and established a military government in May 1961. Park Chung Hee, the Chairman of the Supreme Council, was elected President of South Korea in the 1963 presidential election.

The Third Republic was presented as a return to civilian government under the National Assembly but in practice was a dictatorship under Park, Supreme Council members, and the Democratic Republican Party. The Third Republic prioritized South Korea's economic development, anti-communism, and strengthening ties with the United States and Japan.

Park was re-elected in the 1967 presidential election, and the National Assembly passed a constitutional amendment to allow him to seek a third term, and he was re-elected in the 1971 presidential election. Park declared a state of emergency in December 1971 and announced plans for Korean reunification in a joint communique with North Korea in July 1972. Park launched the October Restoration in October 1972, declaring martial law, dissolving the National Assembly, and announced plans for a new constitution. The Third Republic was dissolved on approval of the Yushin Constitution in the November 1972 constitutional referendum and replaced with the Fourth Republic of Korea.

== History ==
=== Background ===
In May 1961, the Supreme Council for National Reconstruction overthrew the Second Republic of Korea in the May 16 coup, led by Major General Park Chung Hee, in response to its inability to prevent political instability after the overthrow of the First Republic of Korea under President Syngman Rhee in the April Revolution. The Supreme Council established a military junta headed by General Chang Do-yong and the May 16 coup's supporters in the Republic of Korea Army, hoping to kickstart South Korea's economic development that had been ignored for twelve years under the First Republic, and remove so-called "liberation aristocrats"—the ruling class of conservative politicians involved in the Korean independence movement. Power struggles within the Supreme Council allowed Park to engineer the gradual transfer of power from Chang to himself. In July, Park officially replaced Chang as chairman, effectively becoming the de facto dictator of South Korea. The Supreme Council suspended the National Assembly, reinforced South Korea's anti-communist position, and undertook a number of economy-oriented reforms to help industrialize and develop the country, including the first Five-Year Plan.

The Supreme Council's military government was met with instant disapproval from South Korea's main ally, the United States, and Park's early attempts to appease the Americans were disregarded. By 1962, U.S. President John F. Kennedy and his administration began to pressure Park into restoring democracy and civilian rule in South Korea. On 2 December 1962, a referendum was held for a new constitution with a presidential system of rule, which was allegedly passed with a 78% majority. In response, Park discharge himself from military service in order to be eligible to run as a civilian in the upcoming presidential election, despite he and the other military leaders pledging not to run for office. Park narrowly won the 1963 presidential election from former President Yun Po-sun, who was President during the May 16 coup.

=== Establishment ===
The Third Republic of Korea was inaugurated on 17 December 1963, officially dissolving the Supreme Council and ending the three-year constitutional vacuum. The Third Republic was presented as a return to liberal democratic civilian government under the National Assembly, and a new powerful presidential system with the Prime Minister as the second-highest executive position under the President. In theory, President Park and his Democratic Republican Party operated through their democratically elected majority of seats in the National Assembly. However, in practice, the Third Republic was a continuation of the military dictatorship under Park and his government was predominantly composed of former members of the Supreme Council, which often exercised significant autocratic powers.

In May 1967, Park was re-elected President in the 1967 presidential election, defeating Posun of the New Democratic Party with 51.4% of the vote. The South Korean constitution limited the President to two four-year terms, meaning Park was not eligible to run for re-election in 1971 upon the end of his term. However, in 1969 the Democratic Republican Party-dominated National Assembly forced through a constitutional amendment to allow him to seek a third term. Park ran in the May 1971 presidential election and defeated his New Democratic Party opponent Kim Dae-jung with 53.2% of the vote.

In December 1971, Park declared a state of emergency "based on the dangerous realities of the international situation." On 4 July 1972, Park and North Korean leader Kim Il Sung issued the July 4th South–North Joint Statement establishing the three principles of Korean unification as independence, peace, and nation-wide unity.

=== Dissolution ===
On 17 October 1972, Park launched a self-coup known as the October Restoration, dissolving the National Assembly, suspending the constitution, and declaring martial law across the country. Universities were closed, media outlets such as the press, radio and television were subjected to increased censorship, and speech was significantly restricted. Park commissioned work on a brand new constitution, which was completed on 27 October by the emergency State Council. The new constitution, known as the Yushin Constitution, was highly autocratic and authoritarian in design, lacked provisions regarding presidential term limits and elections were extended to every six years – essentially guaranteeing presidency for life for Park Chung Hee.

On 21 November 1972, the Yushin Constitution was approved in the 1972 South Korean constitutional referendum with 92.3% of the vote and came into force, dissolving the Third Republic and establishing the Fourth Republic of Korea in its place.

== Economy ==
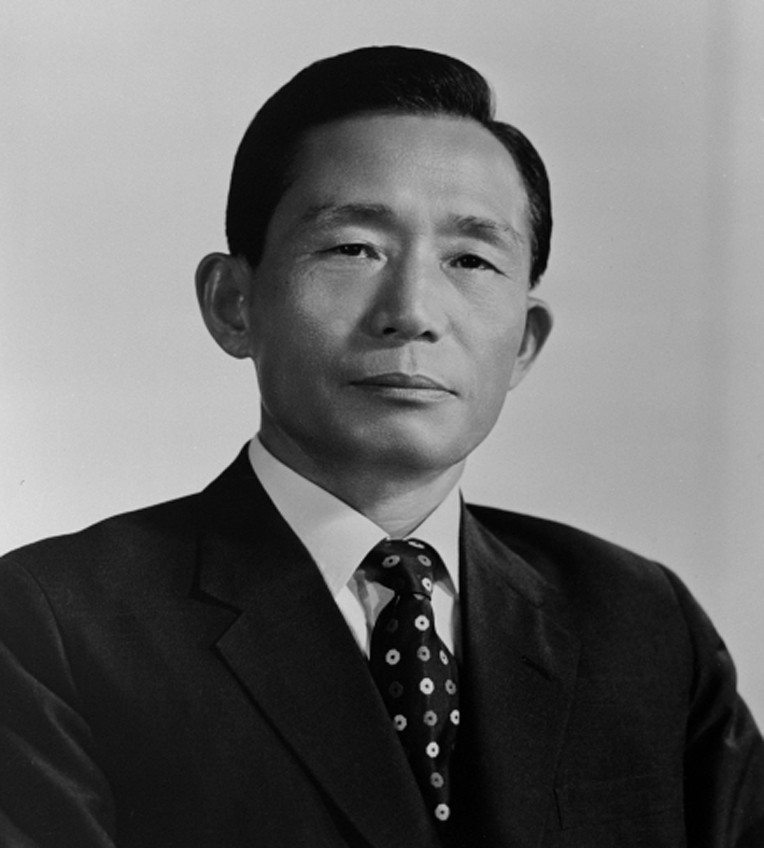
Park Chung Hee served as President for the Third Republic's existence from 1963 to 1972.

The South Korean economy grew rapidly during the Third Republic and the government continued to economic development priorities set by the Supreme Council. The South Korean government used the influx of foreign aid from Japan and the United States to provide loans to export businesses with no interest, and also provided financial support for industrial projects, such as the construction of the POSCO steel mill. The Third Republic saw the first major construction of infrastructure in southern Korea since the Japanese colonial era, with many new roads, railways, and airports being built across the country.

The Third Republic saw the first major growth of the chaebol, the large industrial conglomerates in South Korea that are run and controlled by an owner or family. When the Supreme Council came to power in 1961, they promised to tackle the corruption in the business world that had plagued the First Republic, and this was continued by the new government. However, despite some leading industrialists being arrested and charged with corruption, the new government realized that it would need the help of entrepreneurs if the government's ambitious plans to modernize the economy were to be fulfilled. A compromise was reached, under which many of the accused corporate leaders paid fines to the government. Subsequently, there was increased cooperation between corporate and government leaders in modernizing the economy.

South Korea's economic boom came at the expense of severe restrictions on workers rights, and labor movements that arose during industrialization to secure greater protections for workers were actively suppressed by the Third Republic government.

The Third Republic continued the program with the government of West Germany to recruit South Korean nurses and miners as Gastarbeiter, which began in the final months of the Supreme Council. The costs were largely paid for by the South Korean government, with only their wages and some language services paid for by their West German employers. The Koreans in Germany were able to wire large sums of money to South Korea because their wages, much higher than available back home, greatly exceeded their subsidized living costs. The Gastarbeiter South Koreans have since been argued as a major cause of South Korea's rapid economic growth in the late 20th century.

In 1970, the Saemaul Undong (New Community Movement) was introduced that set out to modernize the countryside and their economies, in response to the growing wealth disparity with the richer urban areas. The Saemaul Undong encouraged communalism and the government provided free materials for locals to develop some infrastructure themselves, rather than relying totally on government-built infrastructure. The government also provided electricity and running water to farmers, built paved roads, and replaced thatched roofs with tin roofs. Reportedly, Park could not stand the sight of thatched roofs on farmers' homes, which for him was a sign of South Korea's backwardness, and their replacement reflected a personal obsession rather than a practical necessity. Controversially, the Saemaul Undong movement actively pushed a type of iconoclasm towards the "superstitions" in rural South Korea, leading many practitioners of Korean shamanism to be harassed and centuries old Korean traditions to be destroyed.

== Education ==
The Third Republic introduced several reforms to the South Korean educational system. In 1968, the entrance examinations for middle schools were abolished, placing all middle schools on an equal footing. Also in 1968, a Charter of National Education was adopted, emphasizing nationalism and anti-communism in education. The charter outlined four goals for education: national revitalization, creating self-reliant individuals, promulgating a new cooperative image of the nation, and supporting anti-communism.

The Third Republic government sought to reduce the political activism among college students which had brought down the First Republic, and planned to disrupt the activism by increasing academic competition. The government allowed universities and colleges to recruit up to 130% of their graduation quotas, so that student activists would be forced to compete against one another in order to graduate. However, student activism continued at a high but reduced level despite these measures.

== International relations ==
The Third Republic began to take an increasingly prominent role in international politics and established new relations with many countries around the world.

South Korea's first diplomatic relations with Japan were established under the Third Republic, and Japan–South Korea relations were normalized in the Treaty on Basic Relations signed on 22 July 1965, and in an agreement ratified on 14 August 1965. Japan agreed to provide a large amount of compensation, grants, and loans to South Korea, and the two countries began economic and political cooperation.

The Third Republic maintained close ties with the United States and continued to receive large amounts of foreign aid. A status of forces agreement was concluded in 1965, clarifying the legal situation of the United States Forces Korea, which the Park sought to remain stationed in South Korea despite publicly pushing for military self-reliance Soon thereafter, South Korea entered the Vietnam War as a combatant under encouragement of the Many Flags program, eventually sending a total of 300,000 soldiers (the second-largest foreign contingent after the United States) to fight for South Vietnam against the communist North Vietnam and its allies.

Greater attempts to develop diplomatic relationships with Western and Asia-Pacific countries occurred in the Third Republic, including the first state visits to Europe by a Korean head of state. During the 1960s, South Korea formed relations with Belgium, Greece, the Netherlands, Portugal, Iceland, Switzerland, Luxembourg, Austria, the Vatican City, and Malta. South Korea held strong relations with Taiwan and West Germany in solidarity against their rival communist governments, Mainland China and East Germany, respectively. The Third Republic generally rejected trying to form relations with communist countries, most of which did not recognize South Korea.

== See also ==
- History of South Korea
- History of Korea
