= Lee Cheol-seung =

South Korean politician (1922–2016)

- 이철승
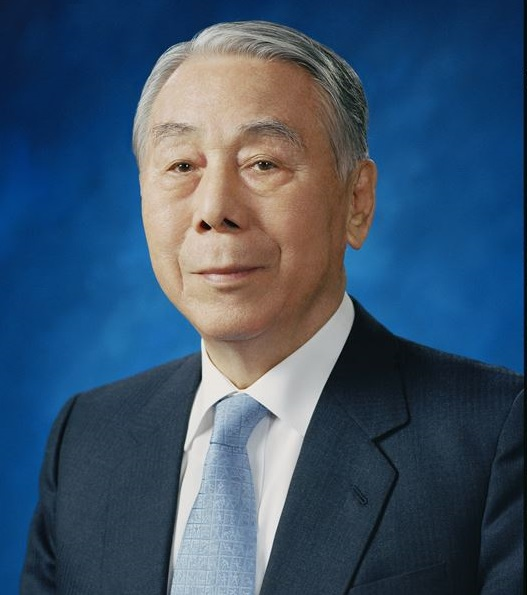

Deputy Speaker of the 9th National Assembly
- In office 12 March 1973 – 11 March 1976
- Preceded by: Kim Jin-man
- Succeeded by: Ku Tae-hui

Member of the National Assembly
- In office 11 April 1985 – 29 May 1988
- Preceded by: Im Bang-hyeon
- Succeeded by: constituency dissolved
- Constituency: Jeonju–Wanju
- In office 12 March 1973 – 27 October 1980
- Preceded by: constituency created
- Succeeded by: Im Bang-hyeon
- Constituency: Jeonju–Wanju
- In office 1 July 1971 – 17 October 1972
- Preceded by: Kim Yong-jin
- Succeeded by: constituency dissolved
- Constituency: Jeonju
- In office 31 May 1954 – 6 May 1961
- Preceded by: Park Jeong-geun
- Succeeded by: constituency dissolved
- Constituency: Jeonju (1954–1958); Jeonju B (1958–1961)

Personal details
- Born: 15 May 1922 Keijō, Korea, Empire of Japan
- Died: 27 February 2016 (aged 93) Gangnam District, Seoul, South Korea
- Resting place: Seoul National Cemetery
- Party: 1954 Independent 1958 Democratic Party; 1971 New Democratic Party (신민당); 1973 New Democratic Party; 1976 Representative Supreme Member, the New Democratic Party; 1978 New Democratic Party; 1985 New Democratic Party;
- Spouse: Kim Chang-hee
- Children: Yanghee Lee (daughter)
- Education: Korea University; University of Pennsylvania
- Awards: Order of Civil Merit

- Korean name
- Hangul: 이철승
- Hanja: 李哲承
- RR: I Cheolseung
- MR: I Ch'ŏlsŭng

Art name
- Hangul: 소석
- Hanja: 素石
- RR: Soseok
- MR: Sosŏk

Lee Cheol-seung (Korean: 이철승; 15 May 1922 – 27 February 2016) was a South Korean politician who served as Deputy Speaker for the 9th National Assembly of South Korea. He was a long-time lawmaker who served seven terms in the National Assembly, representing Jeonju. His art name was Soseok (Korean: 소석; Hanja: 素石).

Lee was an advocate for the Korean independence movement, democracy, anti-communism, anti-military rule, and non-governmental organizations. After Korea was liberated from Japanese colonial rule in 1945, Lee led a student union that opposed the trusteeship of Korea under the United States and Soviet Union. He eventually entered politics in 1954 after winning a parliamentary seat.

Lee and his two political rivals, former Presidents Kim Young-sam and Kim Dae-jung, were famous for their political competition and the establishment and development of democracy in South Korea.He was buried in the Seoul National Cemetery on 2 March 2016.

== Early life and education ==
Lee was born on 15 May 1922 in Seoul (then Keijō), in Japanese-occupied Korea. He attained his bachelor's degree in Political Science at Korea University in 1949. Following the May 16 coup in 1961, led by Park Chung Hee, Kim Jong-pil, and Lee Nak-sun, Lee was forced to relocate to the United States after rejecting Park's request for political support. There, he was vocally opposed to the military regime and studied international relations at the University of Pennsylvania. In 1995, he received an honorary doctorate in literature from Woosuk University, and in 1998, an honorary doctorate in political science from Korea University.

== Political career ==
Following the liberation of Korea in 1945, Lee led a student movement opposing the joint trusteeship of Korea, becoming the chairman of the Anti-Trustee Students Assembly in 1946.

During the 1954 South Korean legislative election, Lee ran a successful campaign as an independent candidate representing Jeonju in the 3rd National Assembly of South Korea. During his first term, Lee opposed the Liberal Party's proposed amendment to the South Korean Constitution, which would allow president Syngman Rhee to run an unlimited number of terms. Following the ratification of the amendment in November 1954, Lee became one of the founding members of the Democratic Party in 1955.

=== Post-political career and civil society leadership ===
Following his political career, Lee remained active in public life through a range of civic organisations. In 1990, he served as a director of the Seoul Peace Prize and as a member of its Selection Committee. In 1993, he served as director of the Commemorative Committee for the "Patriotic Martyr in Yeosoon". From 1994, he served as co-chairman of the National Council for Freedom and Democracy, and from 1995 as an advisor to the Korea Eligible Senior Voters Federation.

From 1996, Lee served simultaneously as chairman of the Seoul Peace Prize Cultural Foundation, as president of the Seoul Peace Prize Selection Committee, as a member of the Organizing Committee for the 2002 FIFA World Cup, and as chairman of the Association of Patriotic Societies for National Foundation. In 1998, he chaired the Preparatory Committee for the Commemorative of the Founding of the Republic of Korea. In 2005, he served as the representative chairman of the 자유민주비상국민회의. From 2007, he served as chairman of the Parliamentarians' Society of the Republic of Korea, and from 2011 until his death in 2016, he held the position of chairman of the Elders Group of the Parliamentarians' Society of the Republic of Korea.

== Death ==
Lee died on February 27, 2016, at 03:45 KST, at Samsung Hospital in Seoul at the age of 94. Following a five-day wake, a funeral was held for him on 2 March 2016, with a police-escorted procession that led to the National Assembly and ended with a gun salute at the Seoul National Cemetery, where he is buried alongside former South Korean presidents.

== Publications ==
- The Republic of Korea and I (대한민국과 나; 2011)
- Oh! Who Will Look After Korea (오! 대한민국 누가 지키리; 2002)
- A Challenge for Hopelessness (절망에의 도전)
- Long March to Democracy (민주의 장정)
- Pan-National Student Federation (전국학련)
- The Middle-of-the-Road Integration Theory (중도통합론; 1992)
- The Sound Argument of Chaotic Period
- A History of Korean Students' National-Building Movement
- How the Republic of Korea was Founded (1998)
- My Political Thoughts for Democratic Development

== See also ==
- Kim Kyu-sik
- Kim Seong-su
- Syngman Rhee
