= 1971 South Korean presidential election =

- 27 April 1971
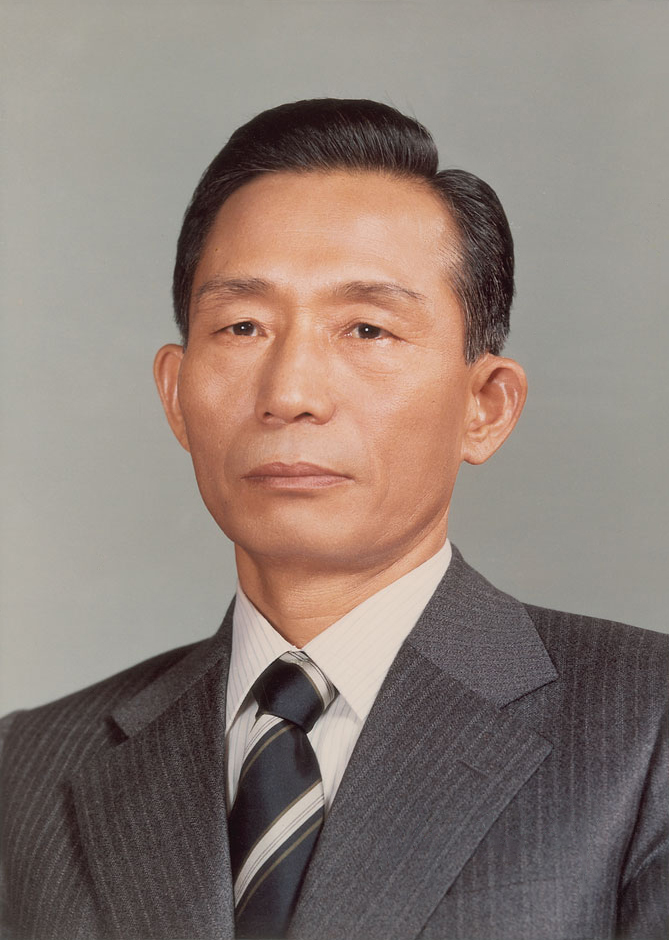

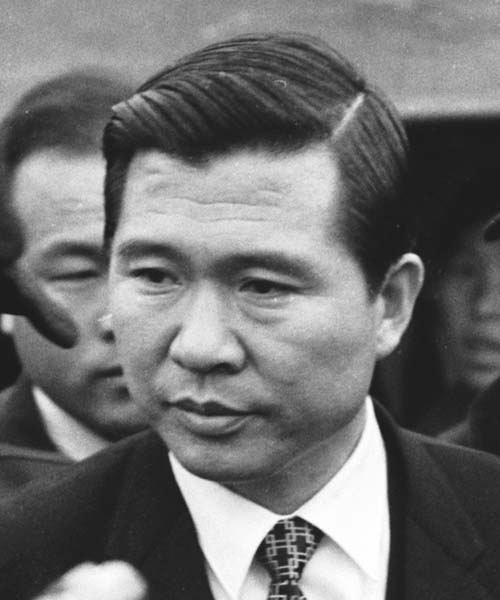
Nominee	Park Chung Hee	Kim Dae-jung
Party	Democratic Republican	New Democratic
Popular vote	6,342,828	5,395,900
Percentage	53.20%	45.26%
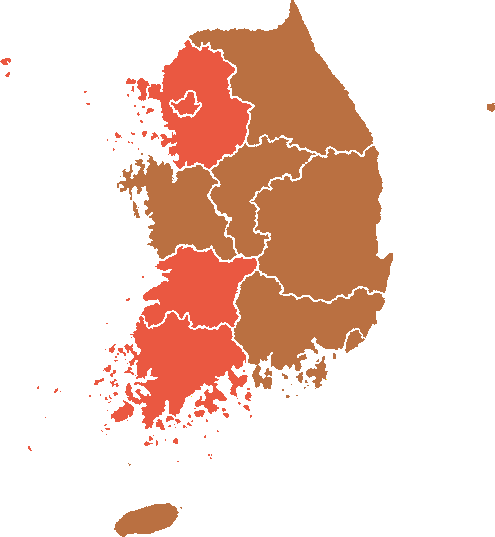
President before election
Park Chung Hee
Democratic Republican
Elected President
Park Chung Hee
Democratic Republican

Presidential elections were held in South Korea on 27 April 1971. The result was a victory for incumbent president Park Chung Hee, who received 53% of the vote. Voter turnout was 80%. Within a year of his re-election, Park declared martial law and introduced the Yushin Constitution, which vested him with sweeping and near-dictatorial powers.

These would be the last contested presidential elections in South Korea until 1981, the last direct presidential election until 1987, and last presidential election in which the victor received an absolute majority of the popular vote until Park's daughter, Park Geun-hye, did so in 2012.

== Nominations ==
=== Democratic Republican Party ===
The DRP Convention was held on 17 March 1971, at which incumbent president Park Chung Hee became the presidential nominee. Under the constitution, Park would have normally been ineligible to run in 1971, as presidents were limited to two consecutive terms. However, shortly after his re-election in 1967, the DRP-dominated legislature passed a constitutional amendment allowing the incumbent president to run for three consecutive terms.

=== New Democratic Party ===
By tradition, the most senior members of the party leadership were supposed to run for president. It was assumed that either former Korea University president Yu Jin-oh, the sitting party chair Yu Jin-san, or former president Yun Po-sun would be chosen for the party's candidate. However, the norm was broken by lawmaker Kim Young-sam, who was only in his early forties, when he declared his bid for the New Democratic nomination for president on 8 November 1969. He was followed by Kim Dae-jung and Lee Cheol-seung, both prominent politicians in their forties. The party leadership tried to discourage the three candidates at first, but later conceded that it was now time for the new generation to take over. Lee Cheol-seung withdrew his bid and endorsed Kim Dae-jung after the party leadership, including Chairman Yu Jin-san, announced they would be backing Kim Young-sam.

At the convention held on 29 September 1970, the establishment-endorsed Kim Young-sam surprisingly lost to the minority faction's Kim Dae-jung, who became the party's candidate.

Candidate	First round		Second round	
Candidate	Delegates	%	Delegates	%
Kim Dae-jung	382	43.16	458	51.81
Kim Young-sam	421	47.57	410	46.38
Invalid/blank votes	82	9.27	16	1.81
Total	885	100	884	100

== Results ==
Candidate	Party	Votes	%
Park Chung Hee	Democratic Republican Party	6,342,828	53.20
Kim Dae-jung	New Democratic Party	5,395,900	45.26
Jin Bok-ki	People's Party	122,914	1.03
Park Gi-chul	National Party	43,753	0.37
Lee Jong-yun	Liberal Democratic Party	17,823	0.15
Total		11,923,218	100.00
Valid votes		11,923,218	96.02
Invalid/blank votes		494,606	3.98
Total votes		12,417,824	100.00
Registered voters/turnout		15,552,236	79.85
Source: Nohlen et al.

=== By province and city ===
Province/City	Park Chung Hee		Kim Dae-jung		Jin Bok-ki		Park Gi-chul		Lee Jong-yun	
Province/City	Votes	%	Votes	%	Votes	%	Votes	%	Votes	%
Seoul	805,772	39.95	1,198,018	59.40	6,881	0.34	4,811	0.24	1,426	0.07
Busan	385,999	55.66	302,452	43.61	1,974	0.28	2,518	0.36	583	0.08
Gyeonggi	687,985	48.87	696,582	49.48	13,770	0.98	6,547	0.47	2,995	0.21
Gangwon	502,722	59.85	325,556	38.76	7,326	0.87	2,985	0.36	1,390	0.17
North Chungcheong	312,744	57.32	222,106	40.70	6,989	1.28	2,662	0.49	1,154	0.21
South Chungcheong	556,632	53.49	461,978	44.39	14,411	1.38	5,285	0.51	2,322	0.22
North Jeolla	308,850	35.49	535,519	61.53	21,162	2.43	3,167	0.36	1,646	0.19
South Jeolla	479,737	34.43	874,974	62.80	31,986	2.30	4,362	0.31	2,122	0.15
North Gyeongsang	1,333,051	75.62	411,116	23.32	9,838	0.56	6,438	0.37	2,374	0.13
South Gyeongsang	891,119	73.36	310,595	25.57	6,793	0.56	4,580	0.38	1,634	0.13
Jeju	78,217	56.85	57,004	41.43	1,784	1.30	398	0.29	177	0.13
Total	6,342,828	53.20	5,395,900	45.26	122,914	1.03	43,753	0.37	17,823	0.15
