= 1972 South Korean constitutional referendum =

- 21 November 1972

Results
Choice	Votes	%
Yes	13,186,559	92.26%
No	1,106,143	7.74%
Valid votes	14,292,702	99.18%
Invalid or blank votes	118,012	0.82%
Total votes	14,410,714	100.00%
Registered voters/turnout	15,676,395	91.93%
- Results by province

A constitutional referendum was held in South Korea on 21 November 1972. President Park Chung-hee had suspended the constitution and dissolved the National Assembly in October. Work began almost immediately on a new constitution. The finished product, the Yushin Constitution, was a severely authoritarian document that dramatically expanded the president's powers and allowed him to run for an unlimited number of six-year terms. For all intents and purposes, the document concentrated all governing power in Park's hands.

According to official figures, the new document was approved by 92.3% of voters, with a turnout of 91.9%. The adoption of the constitution upon the announcement of the official referendum results ushered in the Fourth Republic of South Korea.

== Results ==
Choice	Votes	%
For	13,186,559	92.26
Against	1,106,143	7.74
Total	14,292,702	100.00
Valid votes	14,292,702	99.18
Invalid/blank votes	118,012	0.82
Total votes	14,410,714	100.00
Registered voters/turnout	15,676,395	91.93
Source: Nohlen et al.

=== By province ===
Region	For	%	Against	%	Total	Turnout
Seoul	2,045,941	82.5	410,474	16.6	2,479,585	80.5
Busan	772,749	85.0	127,512	14.0	909,346	93.9
Gyeonggi	1,508,712	92.8	104,759	6.4	1,626,187	94.2
North Chungcheong	621,723	92.8	35,453	5.3	662,739	94.9
South Chungcheong	1,213,614	93.4	74,225	5.7	1,298,688	94.8
Gangwon	791,608	95.8	29,715	3.6	826,398	97.1
North Jeolla	1,015,489	93.5	61,186	5.6	1,086,542	94.2
South Jeolla	1,686,340	95.1	74,741	4.2	1,773,221	93.4
North Gyeongsang	1,983,081	94.1	104,873	5.0	2,108,501	95.3
South Gyeongsang	1,383,424	94.4	74,981	5.1	1,466,227	95.3
Jeju	163,885	94.6	8,224	4.7	173,280	94.9
Source: Kyunghyang Shinmun, 23 November 1972
