= People's Revolutionary Party incident =

- Hangul: 인민혁명당사건
- Hanja: 人民革命黨事件
- Revised Romanization: Inmin hyeongmyeongdang sageon
- McCune–Reischauer: Inmin hyŏngmyŏngdang sakŏn

Abbreviated name
- Hangul: 인혁당 사건
- Hanja: 人革黨事件
- Revised Romanization: Inhyeokdang sageon
- McCune–Reischauer: Inhyŏktang sakŏn

The People's Revolutionary Party Incidents were legal cases in which the South Korean government accused individuals of socialist or left inclinations according to the Anti-communism Law in 1965 (the First Incident) and National Security Law in 1975 (the Second Incident).

On 23 January 2007 the District Court of Central Seoul found the defendants not guilty in regards to the accused violations of the Emergency Presidential Acts, National Security Act, preparation and conspiracy of civil war, and the Anti-communism law.

== The first incident ==
The first incident occurred on 14 August 1965. The Korean Central Intelligence Agency (KCIA) claimed Do Ye-jong (도예종, 都禮鐘), Yang Choon-woo (양춘우, 楊春遇), Park Hyun-chae (박현채) and ten other individuals organized the People's Revolutionary Party. Do, Yang and Park and other six were sentenced to six years imprisonment, while the others were sentenced to a year of imprisonment and three years probation.

== The second incident ==
The second incident, also known as the "Committee for Re-establishment of the People's Revolutionary Party (PRP) Incident" (in Korean: 인민혁명당 재건위원회 사건) in South Korea, took place on 9 April 1975. In December 1972, the Park Chung-Hee government launched the "Yushin-system": an anti-constitutional system in favor of Park's autocracy named after the Meiji Restoration of Japan. Also, the abduction of Kim Dae-jung, a leading politician of the opposing party added to the anger of South Korean people caused by the Yushin system. From October 1973, demonstrations against the Park government gained strength.

Meanwhile, on 3 April 1974, Park announced the existence of an extreme socialist group: the "People's Revolutionary Party", and prohibited all activities related to the party.

As demonstrations increased against the Park dictatorship, the KCIA arrested 1024 individuals without warrant on 25 April 1974 under the National Security Law. 253 of them were imprisoned. On 9 April 1975, the Supreme Court of South Korea sentenced eight men to death. Only 18 hours after the announcement of the death penalty, the government executed the eight individuals:

English name	Korean name	Hanja	Age
Do Ye-jong	도예종	都禮鐘	52
Yeo Jeong-nam	여정남	呂正男	32
Kim Yong-won	김용원	金鏞元	41
Lee Soo-byeong	이수병	李銖秉	40
Ha Jae-wan	하재완	河在完	44
Seo Do-won	서도원	徐道源	53
Song Sang-jin	송상진	宋相振	48
Woo Hong-seon	우홍선	禹洪善	46

== Revision ==
In 2002, an investigatory commission found the charges pressed against those individuals were false. Confessions were obtained using methods such as torture and coercion. It is now widely evidenced that such a "People's Revolutionary Party" never existed in reality, and that it was fabricated by the KCIA.

In January 2007 a Seoul court posthumously acquitted all eight victims of the incident. In August 2007 the Seoul Central District Court awarded compensation in excess of 63 billion won to the families of the victims.

== See also ==
- Third Republic of South Korea
- Fourth Republic of South Korea
- South Korean National Liberation Front Preparation Committee
