= October Restoration =

1972 self-coup by the South Korean president

- Hangul: 10월 유신
- Hanja: 十月維新
- RR: 10wol Yusin
- MR: 10wŏl Yusin

The October Yusin (Korean: 10월 유신) or October Restoration was a self-coup in South Korea in October 1972, in which President Park Chung Hee assumed dictatorial powers. Park had come to power as the head of the Supreme Council for National Reconstruction after the May 16 coup of 1961, and in 1963 he won elections and assumed office as a civilian president.

== Background ==
=== July 4 North–South Joint Declaration ===
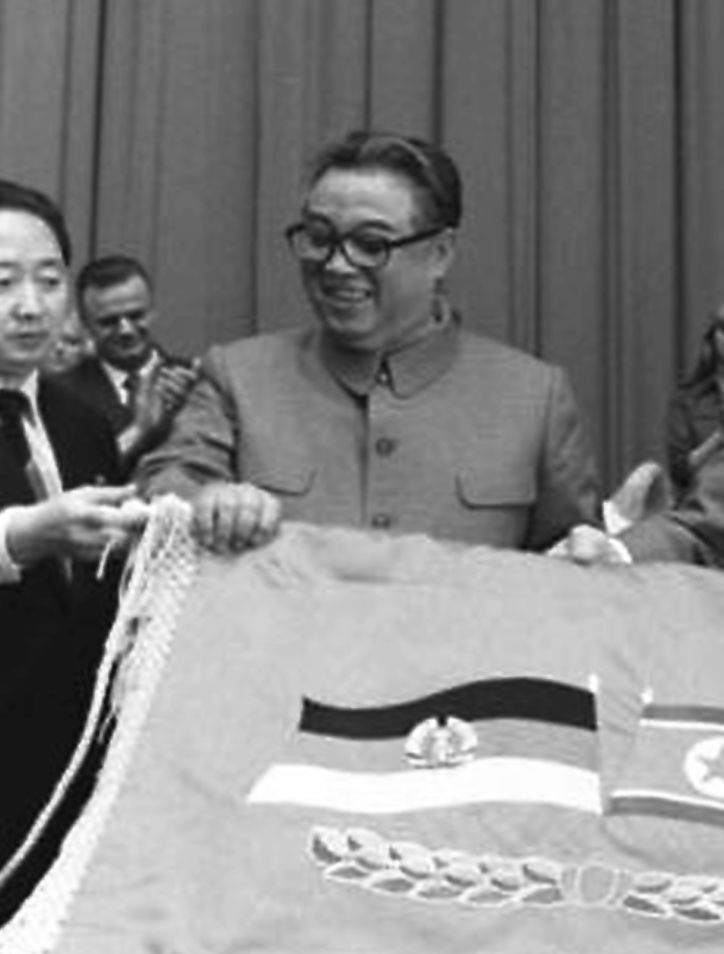
Kim Il Sung

On May 4, 1972, the director of Korea Central Intelligence Agency (KCIA), Lee Hu-rak, went to North Korea and met Kim Il Sung. They announced the North–South Joint Declaration with the three principles of the reunification. After the declaration, a direct phone cable was installed between Seoul and Pyongyang. Enthusiasm for reunification was heating up. Park used it as a pretext for the amendment of the constitution.

=== Third term of the presidency ===
Under the Third Republic's constitution, the president was limited to two terms in office. However, the National Assembly, dominated by Park's Democratic Republican Party, amended the Constitution in 1969 to allow a third term. He was re-elected in the 1971 presidential election.

=== 1971 legislative election ===
The 8th general election was held on May 5, 1971. Park's Democratic Republican Party took 113 seats out of 204. However, it did not reach the minimum condition to pass a constitutional amendment, which required the concurrence of two thirds or more of the total members of the National Assembly. Therefore, Park could not amend the constitution through the lawful procedure.

== Timeline ==
=== 1969 referendum ===
In 1969, with a one-time amendment of the constitution, the incumbent president–Park–was allowed to run for a third consecutive term.

=== Declaration of a state of emergency ===
In December 1971, shortly after winning a third term, Park declared a state of emergency "based on the dangerous realities of the international situation".

=== Coup ===
On October 17, 1972, Park dissolved the National Assembly, suspended the constitution and declared martial law. Universities were also closed. The press, radio and television were subjected to censorship, and speech was significantly restricted. Work was then begun on a new constitution, which was completed on October 27 by the emergency State Council.

The event was named after Japan's 1868 Meiji Restoration. Park Chung Hee, a former officer in the Japanese-controlled Manchukuo Imperial Army, admired Japanese politics, and called his self–coup Yusin (or Yushin), the Korean pronunciation of the Japanese word Ishin (restoration).

The new administration established after the coup is now called the Yusin Regime (유신체제; 維新體制) or Yusin Dictatorship (유신독재; 維新獨裁).

== Constitution of the Fourth Republic ==
Under the Yusin regime, the Constitution of the Third Republic of Korea was replaced by the Yusin Constitution, the Constitution of the Fourth Republic.

In accordance with the Yusin Constitution, an electoral college called the National Council for Unification (통일주체국민회의, Tongil Juche Gungmin Hoeui) was set up. The conference elected the president and one-third of parliament. The presidential term was extended to six years, with no constitutional restrictions on the number of terms one could serve–effectively making Park president for life. It also allowed the president to declare "emergency measures" (긴급조치권, Gingeup Jochi), which allowed the president to promulgate laws without ratification by the National Assembly and suspend civil liberties.

In practice, the conference's power to appoint one-third of legislators was exercised by the president, guaranteeing him a parliamentary majority and control over parliament. Combined with his broad powers to rule by decree and curtail constitutional freedoms, the Yusin Constitution endowed the president with nearly all governing power in the nation.

Park justified his creation of a legal dictatorship by arguing that South Korea's economy was too weak to allow Western-style liberal democracy. Rather, he argued that the country needed a "Korean-style democracy" with a strong, unchallenged presidency in order to remain stable.

== Aftermath ==
The Yusin Regime was soon challenged by activists from groups such as college students, artists, religious leaders, and the opposition. Park suppressed these protests by force. In the People's Revolutionary Party Incident, eight persons were executed for treason. Their confessions, which were extracted by torture, were the only evidence and the executed are now generally considered to have been innocent. Despite this repression, the resistance to the Yusin Regime continued and caused serious social unrest.

The Yusin Regime was criticized internationally for human rights abuse. The American Carter Administration warned that United States military forces might be withdrawn from South Korea unless Park eased off his dictatorship.

On October 26, 1979, the "10.26 Incident" occurred—the assassination of Park Chung Hee by members of the Korean Central Intelligence Agency.

Park's assassination removed the main impetus of the Yusin Regime. Although the military took power by consecutive coups (the 12.12 Coup d'état and the 5.18 Incident) after Park's death, there was a general consensus that the Yusin Constitution was no longer viable. Ultimately, Park was succeeded by Chun Doo-hwan, who promulgated the Constitution of the Fifth Republic, which officially replaced the Yusin Constitution in 1980. This new constitution was somewhat less authoritarian than the Yusin Constitution, although it was still patterned after it and concentrated immense powers into the office of president.

== See also ==
- Bu-Ma Democratic Protests
- Enabling Act of 1933
- Proclamation No. 1081
- 2024 South Korean martial law
