= Fourth Republic of Korea =

Government of South Korea from 1972 to 1981

Republic of Korea 대한민국 大韓民國
- 1972–1981
- Flag Coat of arms
- Anthem: 애국가 "Aegukga"
- National seal "국새"

- Capital: Seoul
- Common languages: Korean
- Government: Unitary semi-presidential republic under an authoritarian (Note: Has been described as totalitarian or authoritarian by multiple sources.) military dictatorship
- De facto leader of South Korea
  - 1979–1980: Chun Doo-hwan
- President
  - 1972–1979: Park Chung Hee
  - 1979–1980: Choi Kyu-hah
  - 1980: Park Choong-hoon (acting)
  - 1980–1981: Chun Doo-hwan
- Prime Minister
  - 1972–1975: Kim Jong-pil
  - 1975–1979: Choi Kyu-hah
  - 1979–1980: Shin Hyun-hwak
  - 1980: Park Choong-hoon (acting)
  - 1980–1981: Nam Duck-woo
- Legislature: National Assembly
- Historical era: Cold War
  - Established: 21 November 1972
  - Assassination of Park Chung Hee: 26 October 1979
  - December Twelfth coup d'état: 12 December 1979
  - May Seventeenth coup d'état: 17 May 1980
  - Gwangju Uprising: 18 May 1980–27 May 1980
  - Disestablished: 24 February 1981
- Currency: South Korean won
Preceded by	Succeeded by
Third Republic of Korea	Fifth Republic of Korea
- Today part of: South Korea

The Fourth Republic of Korea (Korean: 제4공화국; RR: Je sa Gonghwaguk; lit. 'Fourth Republic') was the government of South Korea from November 1972 to February 1981.

The Fourth Republic was founded on the approval of the Yushin Constitution in the 1972 constitutional referendum, codifying the de facto dictatorial powers held by President Park Chung Hee, and succeeding the Third Republic. Park and his Democratic Republican Party ruled under the centralized and authoritarian Yushin System until the assassination of Park on 26 October 1979. The Fourth Republic entered a period of political instability under Park's successor, Choi Kyu-hah, and the escalating martial law declared after Park's death. Choi was unofficially overthrown by Chun Doo-hwan in the coup d'état of December Twelfth in December 1979, and began the armed suppression of the Gwangju Uprising against martial law. Chun launched the coup d'état of May Seventeenth in May 1980, establishing a military dictatorship under the National Council for Reunification and dissolving the National Assembly, and was elected president by the council in the August 1980 presidential election. The Fourth Republic was dissolved on the adoption of a new constitution in March 1981 and replaced with the Fifth Republic of Korea.

== History ==
=== Background ===
Park Chung Hee had served as the leader and de facto dictator of South Korea since July 1961, coming to power two months after leading the May 16 coup which overthrew the Second Republic of Korea. Park and his supporters established the Supreme Council of National Reconstruction, a provisional military junta government that prioritized the economic development of South Korea, but faced strong pressure from the United States to restore the civilian government. In 1963, Park abdicated from his military position to run as a civilian in the October 1963 presidential election, defeating former President Yun Po-sun, who resigned the previous year. The Third Republic of Korea was inaugurated two months later on December 17, the same day Park was formally inaugurated as president, and presented as a return to civilian government under the National Assembly. In reality, it was a continuation of Park's dictatorship, as the government was predominantly members of the Supreme Council, and the National Assembly was dominated by his Democratic Republican Party despite there being more political freedoms and civil liberties. Park won re-election in the 1967 presidential election, and the National Assembly passed a constitutional amendment that allowed him to serve a third term, which he narrowly won in the 1971 presidential election against Kim Dae-jung of the New Democratic Party.

While popular during the 1960s, Park's popularity began to decline in the early 1970s, and he faced growing domestic opposition from both the public and rival politicians. The 1971 presidential election showed that the New Democratic Party achieved significant electoral gains against the Democratic Republican Party, rising from 32.7% of the vote in 1968 to 44.4%. Public dissatisfaction with Park's authoritarian rule increased as the rapid economic growth of the 1960s began to slow down. Additionally, Park became anxious about changes in Cold War politics, especially the United States' policy towards communism under President Richard Nixon's Nixon Doctrine. The legitimacy of Park's government depended on staunch anti-communism, and any moderation of that policy from South Korea's allies threatened the very basis of his rule. In December 1971, Park declared a state of emergency "based on the dangerous realities of the international situation".

=== Establishment ===
On 17 October 1972, Park Chung Hee launched a self-coup known as the October Restoration, dissolving the National Assembly, suspending the 1963 constitution, declaring martial law across the country, and commissioning work on a brand new constitution. Park had drawn inspiration for his self-coup from Ferdinand Marcos, the President of the Philippines, who had orchestrated a similar coup a few weeks earlier.

=== Yushin Constitution ===
- Yushin Constitution
- Hangul: 유신 헌법
- Hanja: 維新憲法
- RR: Yusin heonbeop
- MR: Yusin hŏnpŏp

The Fourth Republic was governed under the Yushin Constitution. Yushin (유신; 維新) has the same Chinese root of "restoration" as a component of the Japanese Meiji Restoration (明治維新, Meiji-ishin), the event which brought Japan under the effective rule of the Emperor of Japan and began the country's rise into a world power in the late 19th century. The significance of the term Yushin was the allusion to the "imperial" role which scholars have seen attached to the presidency under the Yushin Constitution, which effectively concentrated all governing power in Park's hands.

The Yushin Constitution was a severely authoritarian document, marked by the sweeping executive and legislative powers granted to the president. His term was extended to six years, with no limits on re-election. The president was indirectly elected through the National Conference for Unification, an electoral college whose delegates were elected by the public. The requirements for presidential candidacy, however, were so stringent that only one candidate could be on the conference's ballot. He was vested with broad powers to suspend constitutional freedoms and rule by decree. Only one concession was given to the National Assembly, the ability to remove the State Council by a vote of no confidence. Even this was a dead letter, as the President could not only dissolve the National Assembly at will, but also had the right to appoint one-third of its members, effectively guaranteeing a parliamentary majority. For all intents and purposes, the Yushin Constitution codified the emergency powers Park had exercised since the previous December, effectively turning his presidency into a legal dictatorship. The new document sparked widespread but ineffective protests.

Park now argued that Western-style liberal democracy was not suitable for South Korea because of its still-developing economy. Instead, he argued that "Korean-style democracy" with a strong, unchallenged presidency was the only way to keep the country stable.

On 21 November 1972, the Yushin Constitution was approved in the 1972 South Korean constitutional referendum with an implausible 92.3% of the vote with a turnout of 91.9% and came into force, dissolving the Third Republic and establishing the Fourth Republic of Korea. Park was re-elected as president for a fourth term in 1972 and a fifth term in 1978, both times unopposed.

The Fourth Republic witnessed greater instability as Park's popularity, and tolerance of his increasingly naked autocracy, declined steadily during the 1970s. The Yushin Constitution allowed Park to legally and more openly violate civil liberties, particularly to suppress his mounting opposition, but this exacerbated resistance to his regime. Park repeatedly promised a transition to full democracy, but few believed him.

==== Kidnapping of Kim Dae-jung ====
Kim Dae-jung was involved in a car accident shortly after the 1971 presidential election which left him with a permanent hip joint injury. Kim believed the accident was a failed assassination attempt from Park, fleeing to Japan for his safety and forming the dissident South Korean democracy movement there. Kim entered a self-imposed exile in Japan after the enactment of the Yushin Constitution in 1972. On 8 August 1973, Kim was kidnapped at a meeting of the Democratic Unification Party at the Hotel Grand Palace in Tokyo. According to Kim, his kidnappers probably intended to drown him in the Korea Strait by throwing him overboard en route to Korea. However, they were forced to abandon this plan as the Japan Maritime Self-Defense Force began pursuit and fired an illuminating shell at the boat just when the kidnappers brought Kim on the deck. Kim was subsequently released in Busan, and was found alive five days after the kidnapping at his house in Seoul.

==== People's Revolutionary Party Incident ====
In April 1975, the People's Revolutionary Party Incident resurfaced when 1024 individuals were arrested by the KCIA without a warrant under the National Security Act. The arrested were accused of attempting to re-establish a North Korean-backed radical socialist organization known as the People's Revolutionary Party, for which eight people were arrested for founding in August 1965 under South Korea's anti-communism laws. Similar to the original incident, the majority of the arrested were acquitted, with 253 of them imprisoned. On April 9, the Supreme Court of Korea sentenced eight of the arrested to death: Do Ye-jong, Yeo Jeong-nam, Kim Yong-won, Lee Sub-yeong, Ha Jae-wan, Seo Do-won, Song Sang-jin, and Woo Hong-seon. All eight were executed only 18 hours after the announcement of the death penalty. Do Ye-jong was one of the original eight people arrested in 1965.

The People's Revolutionary Party Incident received attention outside of South Korea and spawned significant negative press for Park's regime. Internally, knowledge about the incident was limited to first-hand experience and information from foreign newspapers shared secretly through universities and churches due to the country's strict censorship laws. Most people viewed the People's Revolutionary Party as a farce for Park to suppress democracy activists rather than communists, and news of the incident spread and emboldened the democratization movement at home and abroad.

=== Assassination of Park Chung Hee and dissolution ===
On 26 October 1979, Park was assassinated by Kim Jae-gyu, the director of the Korean Central Intelligence Agency (KCIA) and the president's security chief. Park, four of his bodyguards, and his chauffeur were killed by Kim and other KCIA agents for unknown reasons. The death of Park after 18-years of dictatorial rule caused immediate political turmoil in South Korea. Park was succeeded by Choi Kyu-hah, the Prime Minister since 1975, assuming power as acting president but was almost immediately marginalized by competing factions in the military. After the declaration of martial law following Park's death, General Jeong Seung-hwa acted as the government's chief administrator and appointed Major General Chun Doo-hwan the same day to lead a Joint Investigation Headquarters. On 27 October, Chun unilaterally assumed control of the KCIA and the government intelligence apparatus. On 6 December, the National Council for Unification confirmed Choi Kyu-hah as President according to the framework of the Yusin Constitution, but six days later, Chun spearheaded the coup d'état of December Twelfth, forcibly arresting and detaining General Jeong. By this point Choi had lost any meaningful authority in government, and in early 1980 Chun installed himself as Director of the KCIA.

In May 1980, Chun launched the coup d'état of May Seventeenth, establishing a military dictatorship under the National Council for Reunification and dissolving the National Assembly. The Gwangju Uprising began as a protest in Gwangju on the following day. In response, Chun tightened martial law and violently suppressed protests with troops, with around 200-600 people estimated to have died in the unrest. Although the Gwangju Uprising was successfully suppressed, it consolidated the momentum of nationwide support for democracy in South Korea. In August, Choi resigned and Chun was elected President in the 1980 presidential election by the National Council, running unopposed and winning 99.37% of the vote. In October, Chun abolished all political parties and established his own, the Democratic Justice Party, which was effectively a re-branding of Park's Democratic Republican Party that ruled South Korea since 1963. Chun enacted a new constitution less authoritarian than Park's Yusin Constitution, but that still gave fairly broad powers to the president.

The Fourth Republic was dissolved on 3 March 1981 when Chun was formally inaugurated as President after being re-elected in the February 1981 presidential election, and the Fifth Republic of Korea was established.

== Economy ==
The Fourth Republic saw continued dramatic economic growth. The Park government shifted away from light industry, considered to be highly developed, and began to invest in heavy industries in a plan known as the Heavy-Chemical Industry Drive. The heavy industry shift was primarily driven by the Korean DMZ Conflict from 1966 to 1969, which caused the South Korean leadership to fear it lacked the self-sufficiency to defend itself from North Korea without significant assistance from the United States. In the late 1960s, increasing American involvement in the Vietnam War led the South Korean leadership to believe the transfer of enough troops from the United States Forces Korea to Indochina would make South Korea vulnerable to North Korea, which had amassed an enormous army, and an industrial establishment almost wholly devoted to the supply it, on the other side of the DMZ. Therefore, South Korea viewed the development of heavy industries as necessary for survival against potential North Korean aggression and set out to build an industrial infrastructure that could support a modernized military. Park decided to channel the economic development capabilities of the state into the development of several key industries: steel, petrochemicals, automobiles, machine tools, shipbuilding, and electronics. Park enlisted the chaebols, the large family-owned conglomerates, as they possessed the capital to develop these industries. The Heavy-Chemical Industry Drive, which successfully developed heavy industry in South Korea, came at the cost of severe political and social repercussions. Wildcat strikes from the industrial working class and student protests against Park became increasingly frequent due to his undelivered promises of democratization, and are believed to have contributed to his assassination in 1979. Environmental damage and industrial accidents caused serious health issues, with one notable phenomenon known as Onsan illness, a pollution disease affecting people around Onsan, a town on the outskirts of the major city of Ulsan.

Increased oil prices set by oil-rich Middle Eastern countries put pressure on the economic development of South Korea's heavy industry, but South Korean construction companies became highly active in the Middle East and saw an influx of foreign currency from these countries.

The first reactor of the Kori Nuclear Power Plant near Busan began commercial operation in 1978.

== International relations ==
A variety of events in international diplomacy led the Park regime to reconsider its diplomatic position. Notable were the normalization of U.S. diplomatic relations with the People's Republic of China, which cast doubt on South Korea's ability to count on Cold War backing from the United States. The South Korean government began to establish diplomatic relations with many countries, such as Canada. In addition, the first round of Red Cross talks were held between South Korea and North Korea. Park also announced plans for eventual reunification.

== Society ==
In December 1974, The Dong-A Ilbo, one of the largest newspapers in South Korea, and its subsidiaries began to release media with empty advertisement slots in protest against Park's strict censorship laws. The Dong-a Ilbo had a long history of defying and protesting the authoritarian governments in Korea, and had been in dispute with Park since he led the Supreme Council of National Reconstruction. The KCIA began to force The Dong-a Ilbo's main advertisers to withdraw, and the company relied on small advertisers until it was eventually pressured by the government into ending its protest campaign seven months later. The incident resulted in employees being dismissed, many of whom co-founded the popular newspaper The Hankyoreh.

In 1975, Park ordered the homeless to be removed from the streets of Seoul, and thousands of people were arrested by the police and dispersed between thirty-six internment camps, the largest of which was Brothers Home. The detainees were then used as slave labor by the authorities and subjected to degrading treatment, with many dying under torture.

== See also ==
- History of South Korea
- History of Korea
- October Restoration
