= History of South Korea =

The history of South Korea begins with the Japanese surrender on 2 September 1945. At that time, South Korea and North Korea were divided, despite being the same people and on the same peninsula. In 1950, the Korean War broke out. North Korea overran South Korea until US-led UN forces intervened. At the end of the war in 1953, the border between South and North remained largely similar. Tensions between the two sides continued. South Korea alternated between dictatorship and liberal democracy. It underwent substantial economic development.

== Background ==
After Japan's defeat in the Pacific War in 1945, the Korean region, which was part of Japan's territory, was occupied by American and Soviet forces. In 1948, with the end of the U.S. military government, South Korea declared its independence from Japan as the Republic of Korea. In 1952, when Japan approved the independence of the Korean region under the San Francisco Peace Treaty, it became a completely independent and sovereign nation under international law. The unconditional surrender of Japan led to the division of Korea into two occupation zones (similar to the four zones in Germany), with the United States administering the southern half of the peninsula and the Soviet Union administering the area north of the 38th parallel. This division was meant to be temporary (as was in Germany) and was first intended to return a unified Korea back to its people after the United States, United Kingdom, Soviet Union, and China could arrange a single government for the peninsula.

The two parties were unable to agree on the implementation of a Joint Trusteeship over Korea because of 2 different opinions. This led in 1948 to the establishment of two separate governments with the two very opposite ideologies; the Communist-aligned Democratic People's Republic of Korea (DPRK) and the West-aligned First Republic of Korea – each claiming to be the legitimate government of all of Korea. On 25 June 1950, the Korean War broke out. After much destruction, the war ended on 27 July 1953, with the 1948 status quo being restored, as neither the DPRK nor the First Republic had succeeded in conquering the other's portion of the divided Korea. The peninsula was divided by the Korean Demilitarized Zone and the two separate governments stabilized into the existing political entities of North and South Korea.

South Korea's subsequent history is marked by alternating periods of democratic and autocratic rule. Civilian governments are conventionally numbered from the First Republic of Syngman Rhee to the contemporary Sixth Republic. The First Republic, arguably democratic at its inception (though preceded by major anti-communist and anti-socialist purges), became increasingly autocratic until its collapse in 1960. The Second Republic was strongly democratic but was overthrown in under a year and replaced by an autocratic military regime. The Third, Fourth, and Fifth Republics were nominally democratic, but are widely regarded as the continuation of military rule. With the current Sixth Republic, the country has gradually stabilized into a liberal democracy.

Since its inception, South Korea has seen substantial development in education, economy, and culture. Since the 1960s, the nation has developed from one of Asia's poorest to one of the world's wealthiest nations. Education, particularly at the tertiary level, has expanded dramatically. It is said to be one of the "Four Tigers" of rising Asian states along with Singapore, Taiwan and Hong Kong.

== U.S. military administration (1945–1948) ==
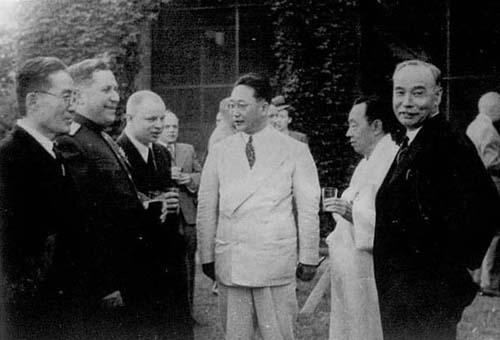
Lyuh Woon-hyung (far right) at the US-Soviet Joint Commission in 1947

Emperor Hirohito announced the surrender of the Empire of Japan to the Allied Powers on 15 August 1945. General Order No. 1 for the surrender of Japan (prepared by the Joint Chiefs of Staff of U.S. military forces and approved on 17 August 1945) prescribed separate surrender procedures for Japanese forces in Korea north and south of the 38th parallel. After Japan's surrender to the Allies (formalised on 2 September 1945), division at the 38th parallel marked the beginning of Soviet and U.S. occupation of the North and South, respectively. This division was meant to be temporary, to be replaced by a trusteeship of the United States, United Kingdom, Soviet Union, and Republic of China which would prepare for Korean independence. The trusteeship had been discussed at the Yalta Conference in February 1945. U.S. forces landed at Incheon on 8 September 1945, and established a military government shortly thereafter. Lieutenant General John R. Hodge, their commander, took charge of the government. Faced with mounting popular discontent, in October 1945 Hodge established the Korean Advisory Council. The Provisional Government of the Republic of Korea, which had operated from China, sent a delegation with three interpreters to Hodge, but he refused to meet with them. Likewise, Hodge refused to recognize the newly formed People's Republic of Korea and its People's Committees, and outlawed it on 12 December. A year later, an interim legislature and interim government were established, headed by Kim Kyu-shik and Syngman Rhee respectively. Political and economic chaos – arising from a variety of causes – plagued the country in this period. The after-effects of the Japanese exploitation remained in the South, as in the North. In addition, the U.S. military was largely unprepared for the challenge of administering the country, arriving with little knowledge of the language, culture or political situation. Thus many of their policies had unintended destabilizing effects. Waves of refugees from North Korea and returnees from abroad added to the turmoil.

In December 1945 a conference convened in Moscow to discuss the future of Korea. A five-year trusteeship was discussed, and a US-Soviet joint commission was established. The commission met intermittently in Seoul but deadlocked over the issue of establishing a national government. In September 1947, with no solution in sight, the United States submitted the Korean question to the UN General Assembly.

The resolution from the UN General Assembly called for a UN-supervised general election in Korea, but after the North rejected this proposition, a general election for a Constitutional Assembly took place in the South only, in May 1948. A constitution was adopted, "setting forth a presidential form of government and specifying a four-year term for the presidency." According to the provisions of the Constitution, an indirect presidential election took place in July. Rhee Syngman, as head of the new assembly, assumed the presidency and proclaimed the Republic of Korea (South Korea) on 15 August 1948.

== First Republic (1948–1960) ==
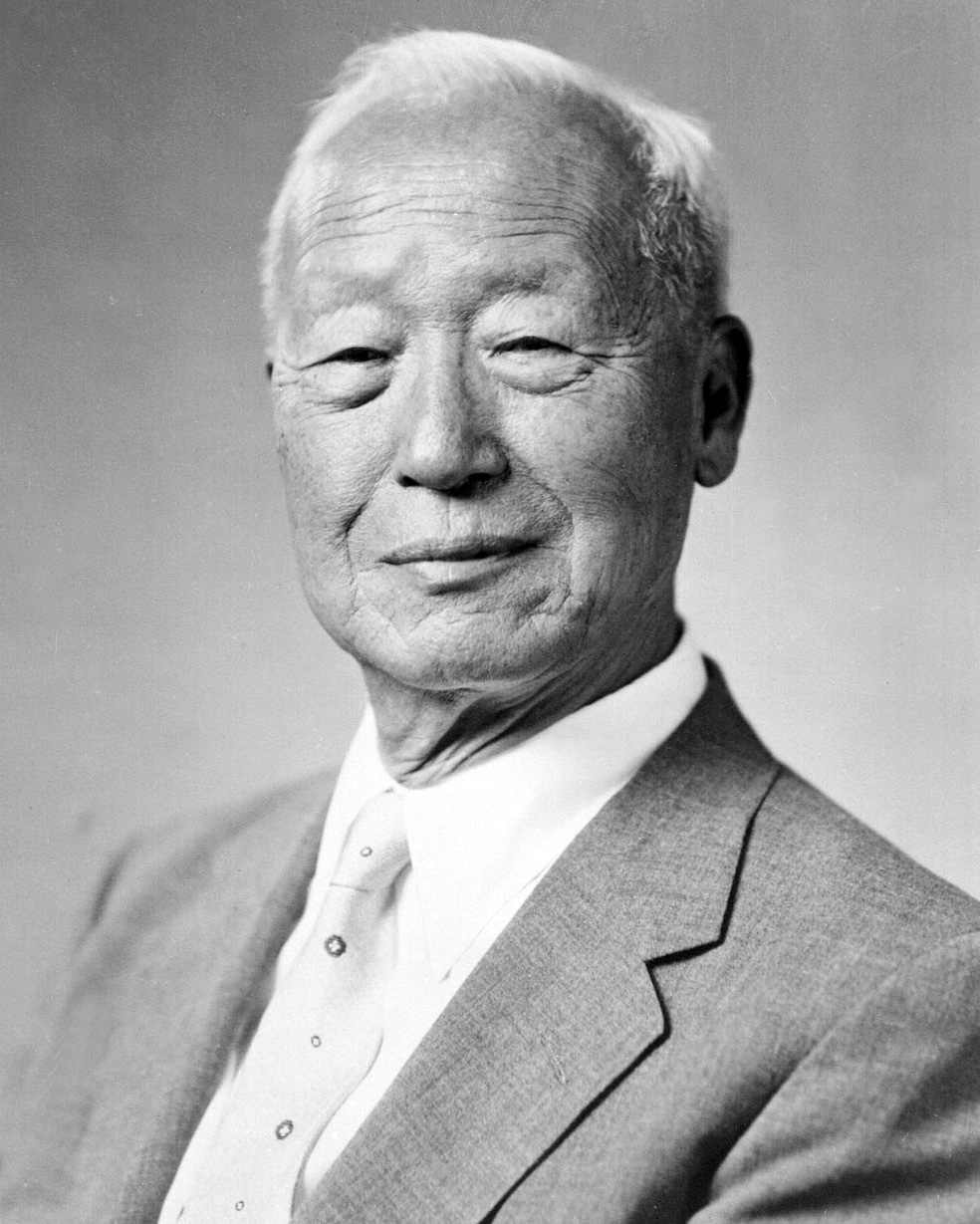
Syngman Rhee, the 1st President of South Korea

On 15 August 1948, the Republic of Korea was formally established, with Syngman Rhee as the first president. With the establishment of Rhee's government, de jure sovereignty also passed into the new government. On 9 September 1948, a communist government, the Democratic People's Republic of Korea (North Korea), was proclaimed under Kim Il Sung. However, on 12 December 1948, by its resolution 195 in the Third General Assembly, the United Nations recognized the Republic of Korea as the sole legal government of Korea.

In 1946, the North implemented land reforms by confiscating private property, Japanese and pro-Japanese owned facilities and factories, and placed them under state ownership. Demand for land reform in the South grew strong, and it was eventually enacted in June 1949. Koreans with large landholdings were obliged to divest most of their land. Approximately 40 percent of total farm households became small landowners. However, because preemptive rights were given to people who had ties with landowners before liberation, many pro-Japanese groups obtained or retained properties.

With the country now divided, the relationship between the two Koreas turned more antagonistic as time passed. The Soviet forces having withdrawn in 1948, North Korea pressured the South to expel the United States forces, but Rhee sought to align his government strongly with America, and against both North Korea and Japan. Although talks towards normalization of relations with Japan took place, they achieved little. Meanwhile, the government took in vast sums of American aid, in amounts sometimes near the total size of the national budget. The nationalist government also continued many of the practices of the U.S. military government. In 1948, the Rhee government repressed military uprisings in Jeju, Suncheon and Yeosu. During the rebellion and its suppression 14,000 to 60,000 people were killed in all fighting. Of note, President Rhee's regime was intolerant of opposition. A famous event that highlighted this was the arrest and conviction of future President Park Chung Hee, for communist conspiracy in 1948.

The main policy of the First Republic of South Korea was anti-communism and "unification by expanding northward". The South's military was neither sufficiently equipped nor prepared, but the Rhee administration was determined to reunify Korea by military force with aid from the United States. However, in the second parliamentary elections held on 30 May 1950, the majority of seats went to independents who did not endorse this position, confirming the lack of support and the fragile state of the nation.

When the communist army attacked from the North in June, retreating South Korean forces executed tens of thousands suspected communists or sympathisers, either in prison or in a reeducation movement, in what is known as the Bodo League massacre.

On 25 June 1950, North Korean forces invaded South Korea. Led by the U.S., a 16-member coalition undertook the first collective action under the United Nations Command (UNC) in defense of South Korea. Oscillating battle lines inflicted a high number of civilian casualties and wrought immense destruction. With the People's Republic of China's entry on behalf of North Korea in late 1950, the fighting came to a stalemate close to the original line of demarcation. Armistice negotiations, initiated in July 1951, finally concluded on 27 July 1953 at Panmunjom, now in the Demilitarized Zone (DMZ). Following the armistice, the South Korean government returned to Seoul on the symbolic date of 15 August 1953.

After the armistice, South Korea experienced political turmoil under years of autocratic leadership of Syngman Rhee, which was ended by student revolt in 1960. Throughout his rule, Rhee sought to take additional steps to cement his control of government. These began in 1952, when the government was still based in Busan due to the ongoing war. In May of that year, Rhee pushed through constitutional amendments which made the presidency a directly elected position. To do this, he declared martial law, arrested opposing members of parliament, demonstrators, and anti-government groups. Rhee was subsequently elected by a wide margin.

Rhee regained control of parliament in the 1954 election, and thereupon pushed through an amendment to exempt himself from the eight-year term limit, and was once again re-elected in 1956. Soon after, Rhee's administration arrested members of the opposing party and executed the leader after accusing him of being a North Korean spy.

The administration became increasingly repressive while dominating the political arena, and in 1958, it sought to amend the National Security Law to tighten government control over all levels of administration, including the local units. These measures caused much outrage among the people, but despite public outcry, Rhee's administration rigged the March 1960 presidential election and won by a landslide.

On that election day, protests by students and citizens against the irregularities of the election burst out in the city of Masan. Initially these protests were quelled with force by local police, but when the body of a student was found floating in the harbor of Masan, the whole country was enraged and protests spread nationwide. On 19 April, students from various universities and schools rallied and marched in protest in the Seoul streets, in what would be called the April Revolution. The government declared martial law, called in the army, and suppressed the crowds with open fire. Subsequent protests throughout the country shook the government, and after an escalated protest with university professors taking to the streets on 25 April, Rhee submitted his official resignation on 26 April and fled into exile.

== Second Republic (1960–1963) ==
After the student revolution, power was briefly held by an interim administration under the Foreign Minister Heo Jeong. A new parliamentary election was held on 29 July 1960. The Democratic Party, which had been in the opposition during the First Republic, easily gained power and the Second Republic was established. The revised constitution dictated the Second Republic to take the form of a parliamentary cabinet system where the President took only a nominal role. This was the first and the only instance South Korea turned to a parliamentary cabinet system instead of a presidential system. The assembly elected Yun Po-sun as president and Chang Myon as the Prime Minister and head of government in August 1960.

The Second Republic saw the proliferation of political activity which had been repressed under the Rhee regime. Much of this activity was from leftist and student groups, which had been instrumental in the overthrow of the First Republic. Union membership and activity grew rapidly during the later months of 1960, including the Teachers' Union, Journalists' Union, and the Federation of Korean Trade Union. Around 2,000 demonstrations were held during the eight months of the Second Republic.

Under pressure from the left, the Chang government carried out a series of purges of military and police officials who had been involved in anti-democratic activities or corruption. A Special Law to this effect was passed on 31 October 1960. 40,000 people were placed under investigation; of these, more than 2,200 government officials and 4,000 police officers were purged. In addition, the government considered reducing the size of the army by 100,000, although this plan was shelved.

In economic terms as well, the government was faced with mounting instability. The government formulated a Five-Year Economic Development Plan, although it was unable to act on it prior to being overthrown. The Second Republic saw the hwan lose half of its value against the dollar between fall 1960 and spring 1961.

Although the government had been established with support of the people, it had failed to implement effective reforms which brought about endless social unrest, political turmoil and ultimately, the May 16 coup.

=== Military rule (1961–1963) ===
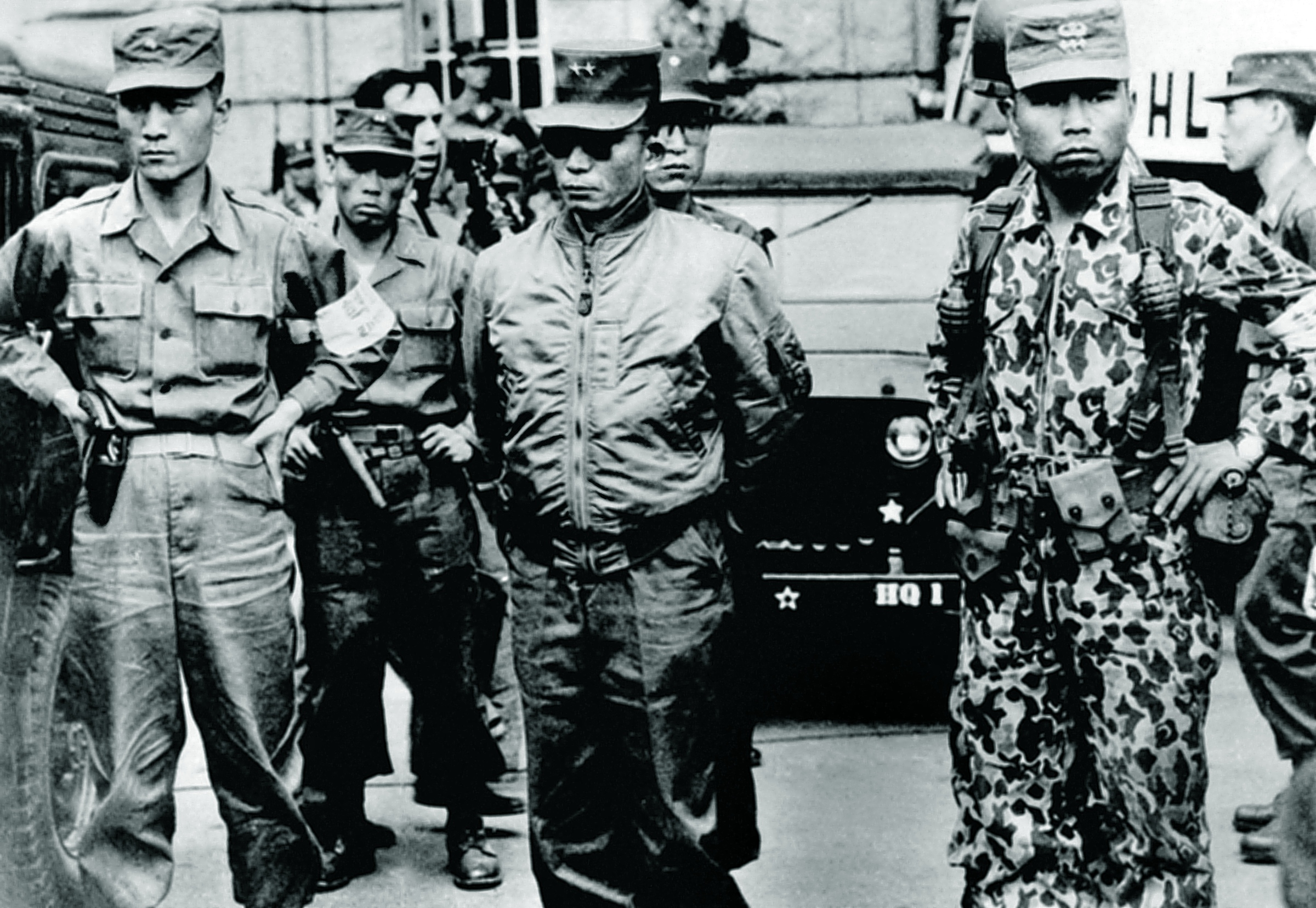
Major General Park Chung Hee (center) during the May 16 coup

The May 16 coup, led by Major General Park Chung Hee on 16 May 1961, put an effective end to the Second Republic. Park was one of a group of military leaders who had been pushing for the de-politicization of the military. Dissatisfied with the cleanup measures undertaken by the Second Republic and convinced that the current disoriented state would collapse into communism, they chose to take matters into their own hands.

The National Assembly was dissolved and military officers replaced the civilian officials. In May 1961, the junta declared "Pledges of the Revolution": anticommunism; strengthened relations with the United States; an end to government corruption termed "fresh and clean morality"; a self-reliant economy; working towards reunification; and a return to democratic civilian government within two years.

As a means to check the opposition, the military authority created the Korean Central Intelligence Agency (KCIA) in June 1961, with Kim Jong-pil, a relative of Park, as its first director. In December 1962, a referendum was held on returning to a presidential system of rule, which was allegedly passed with a 78% majority. Park and the other military leaders pledged not to run for office in the next elections. However, Park became presidential candidate of the new Democratic Republican Party (DRP), which consisted of mainly KCIA officials, ran for president and won the 1963 presidential election by a narrow margin.

== Third Republic (1963–1972) ==
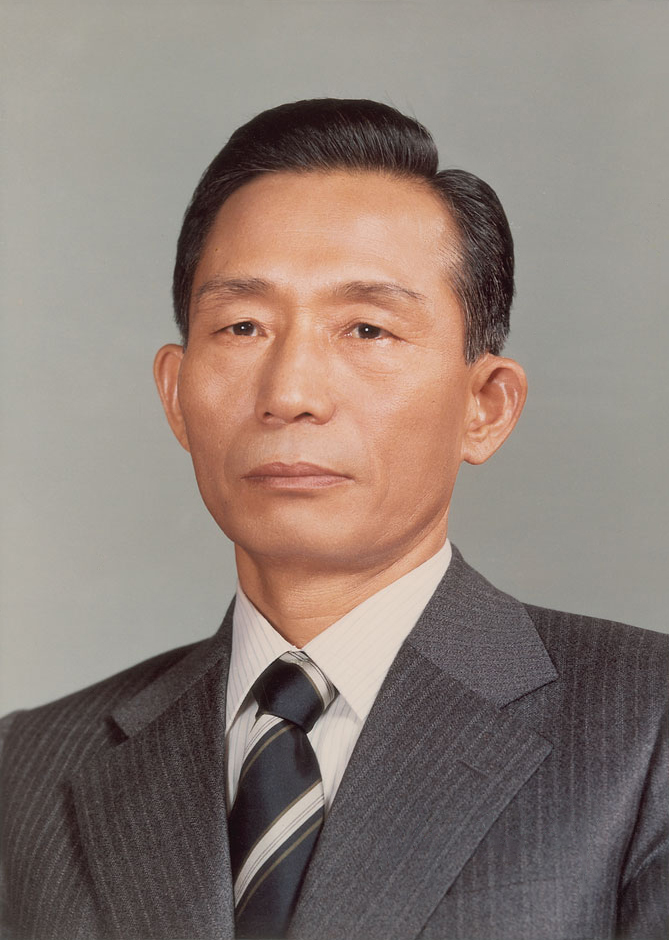
President Park Chung Hee, who ruled South Korea from 1961 to 1979

Park's administration started the Third Republic by announcing the Five-Year Economic Development Plan, an export-oriented industrialization policy. Top priority was placed on the growth of a self-reliant economy and modernization; "Development First, Unification Later" became the slogan of the times and the economy grew rapidly with vast improvement in industrial structure, especially in the basic and heavy chemical industries. Capital was needed for such development, so the Park regime used the influx of foreign aid from Japan and the United States to provide loans to export businesses, with "preferential treatment in obtaining low-interest bank loans" and tax benefits. Cooperating with the government, these businesses would later become the chaebol.

Relations with Japan were normalized by the Korea-Japan treaty ratified in June 1965. This treaty "brought Japanese funds in the form of loans and compensation for the damages suffered during the colonial era" without an official apology from the Japanese government, sparking much protest across the nation.

The government also kept close ties with the United States, and continued to receive large amounts of aid. A status of forces agreement was concluded in 1966, clarifying the legal situation of the US forces stationed there. Soon thereafter, Korea joined the Vietnam War, eventually sending a total of 300,000 soldiers from 1964 to 1973 to fight alongside US troops and South Vietnamese Armed Forces.

Economic and technological growth during this period improved the standard of living, which expanded opportunities for education. Workers with higher education were absorbed by the rapidly growing industrial and commercial sectors, and urban population surged. Construction of the Gyeongbu Expressway was completed and linked Seoul to the nation's southeastern region and the port cities of Incheon and Busan. Despite the immense economic growth, however, the standard of living for city laborers and farmers was still low. Laborers were working with low wages to increase the price competitiveness for the export-oriented economy plan, and farmers were in near poverty as the government controlled prices. As the rural economy steadily lost ground and caused dissent among the farmers, however, the government decided to implement measures to increase farm productivity and income by instituting the Saemaul Movement ("New Village Movement") in 1971. The movement's goal was to improve the quality of rural life, modernize both rural and urban societies and narrow the income gap between them.

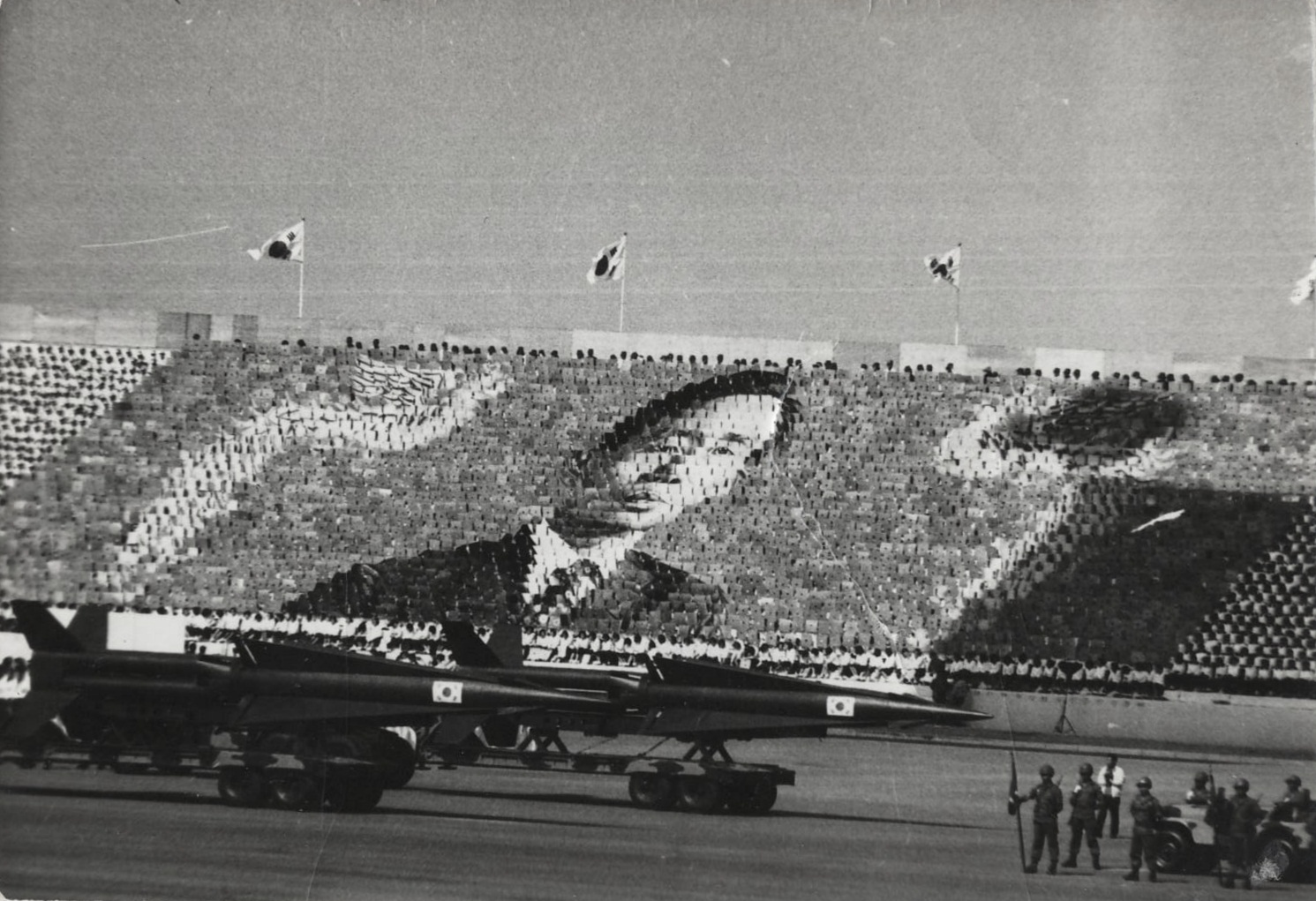
A card portrait of Park Chung Hee during a military parade on Armed Forces Day, 1 October 1973

Park ran again in the 1967 presidential election, taking 51.4% of the vote. At the time the presidency was constitutionally limited to two terms, but a constitutional amendment was forced through the National Assembly in 1969 to allow him to seek a third term. Major protests and demonstrations against the constitutional amendment broke out, with large support gaining for the opposition leader Kim Dae-jung, but Park was again re-elected in the 1971 presidential election.

Parliamentary elections followed shortly after the presidential election where the opposition party garnered most of the seats, giving them the power to pass constitutional amendments. Park, feeling threatened, declared a state of national emergency on 6 December 1971. In the midst of this domestic insecurity, the Nixon Doctrine had eased tensions among the world superpowers on the international scene, which caused a dilemma for Park, who had justified his regime based on the state policy of anti-communism. In a sudden gesture, the government proclaimed a joint communiqué for reunification with North Korea on 4 July 1972, and held Red Cross talks in Seoul and Pyongyang. However, there was no change in government policy regarding reunification, and on 17 October 1972, Park declared martial law, dissolving the National Assembly and suspending the constitution.

== Fourth Republic (1972–1981) ==
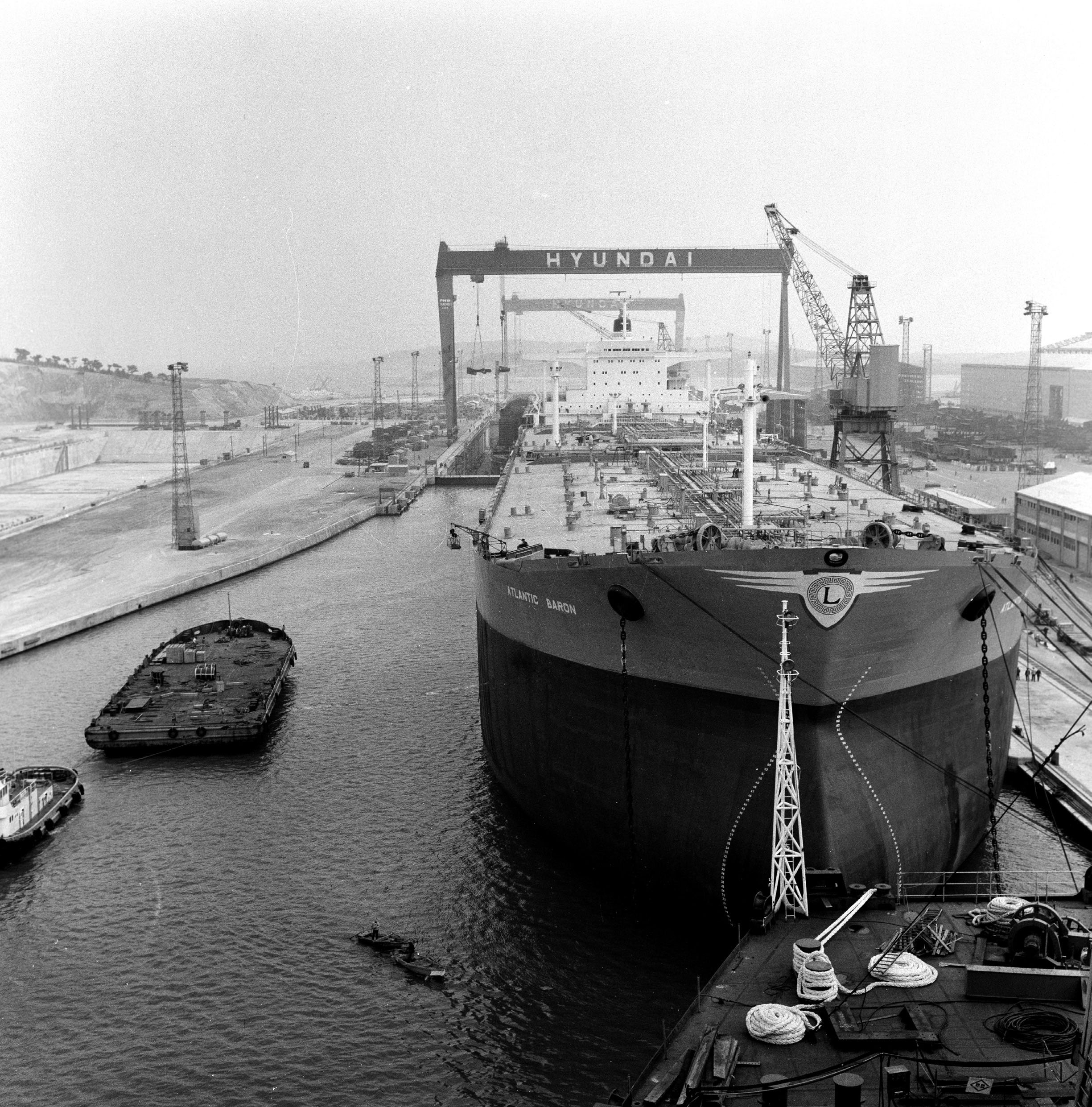
Shipyard of Hyundai Heavy Industries at Ulsan in 1976

The Fourth Republic began with the adoption of the Yushin Constitution on 21 November 1972. This new constitution gave Park effective control over the parliament and the possibility of permanent presidency. The president would be elected through indirect election by an elected body, and the term of presidency was extended to six years with no restrictions on reappointment. The legislature and judiciary were controlled by the government, and educational guidelines were under direct surveillance as well. Textbooks supporting the ideology of the military government were authorized by the government, diminishing the responsibilities of the Ministry of Education.

Despite social and political unrest, the economy continued to flourish under the authoritarian rule with the export-based industrialization policy. The first two five-year economic development plans were successful, and the 3rd and 4th five-year plans focused on expanding the heavy and chemical industries, raising the capability for steel production and oil refining. However, large conglomerate chaebols continuously received preferential treatment and came to dominate the domestic market. As most of the development had come from foreign capital, most of the profit went back to repaying the loans and interest.

Students and activists for democracy continued their demonstrations and protests for the abolition of the Yushin system and in the face of continuing popular unrest, Park's administration promulgated emergency decrees in 1974 and 1975, which led to the jailing of hundreds of dissidents. The protests grew larger and stronger, with politicians, intellectuals, religious leaders, laborers and farmers all joining in the movement for democracy. In 1978, Park was elected to another term by indirect election, which was met with more demonstrations and protests. The government retaliated by removing the opposition leader Kim Young-sam from the assembly and suppressing the activists with violent means. In 1979, mass anti-government demonstrations occurred nationwide. In the midst of this political turmoil, Park Chung Hee was assassinated by the director of the KCIA, Kim Jae-gyu, thus bringing the 18-year rule of military regime to an end.

== Fifth Republic (1981–1988) ==
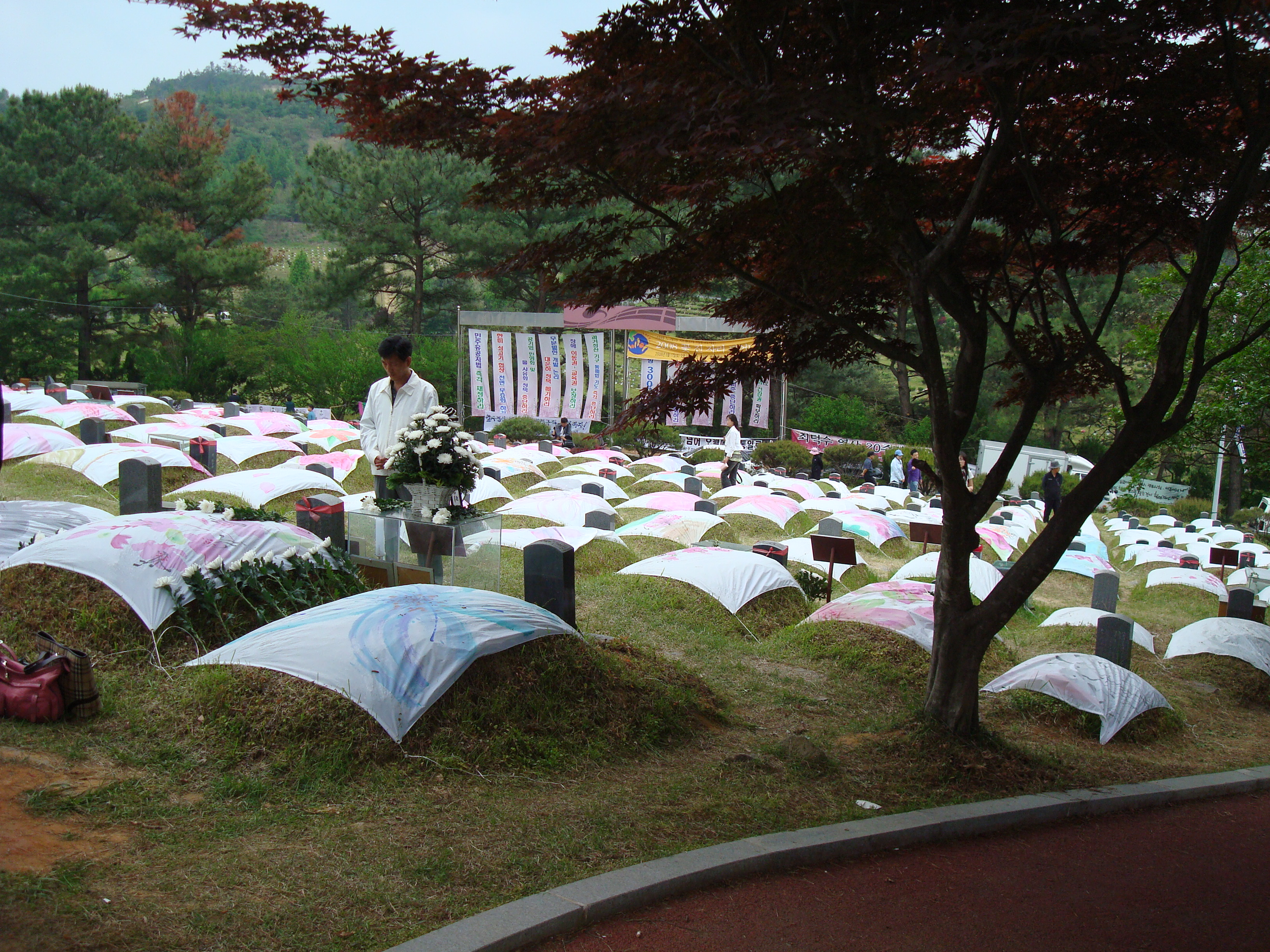
Burial grounds of the victims of the Gwangju Uprising at Mangwol-dong cemetery

After the assassination of Park Chung Hee, Prime Minister Choi Kyu-hah took the president's role only to be usurped 6 days later by Major General Chun Doo-hwan's 1979 Coup d'état of December Twelfth. In May of the following year, a vocal civil society composed primarily of university students and labour unions led strong protests against authoritarian rule all over the country. Chun Doo-hwan declared martial law on 17 May 1980, and protests escalated. Political opponents Kim Dae-jung and Kim Jong-pil were arrested, and Kim Young-sam was confined to house arrest.

On 18 May 1980, a confrontation broke out in the city of Gwangju between protesting students of Chonnam National University and the armed forces dispatched by the Martial Law Command. The incident turned into a citywide protest that lasted nine days until 27 May and resulted in the Gwangju massacre. Immediate estimates of the civilian death toll ranged from a few dozen to 2000, with a later full investigation by the civilian government finding nearly 200 deaths and 850 injured. In June 1980, Chun ordered the National Assembly to be dissolved. He subsequently created the National Defense Emergency Policy Committee, and installed himself as a member. On 17 July, he resigned his position of KCIA Director, and then held only the position of committee member. In September 1980, President Choi Kyu-hah was forced to resign from president to give way to the new military leader, Chun Doo-hwan.

In September of that year, Chun was elected president by indirect election and inaugurated in March of the following year, officially starting the Fifth Republic. A new Constitution was established with notable changes; maintaining the presidential system but limiting it to a single 7-year term, strengthening the authority of the National Assembly, and conferring the responsibilities of appointing judiciary to the Chief Justice of the Supreme Court. However, the system of indirect election of the president stayed and many military persons were appointed to highly ranked government positions, keeping the remnants of the Yushin era.

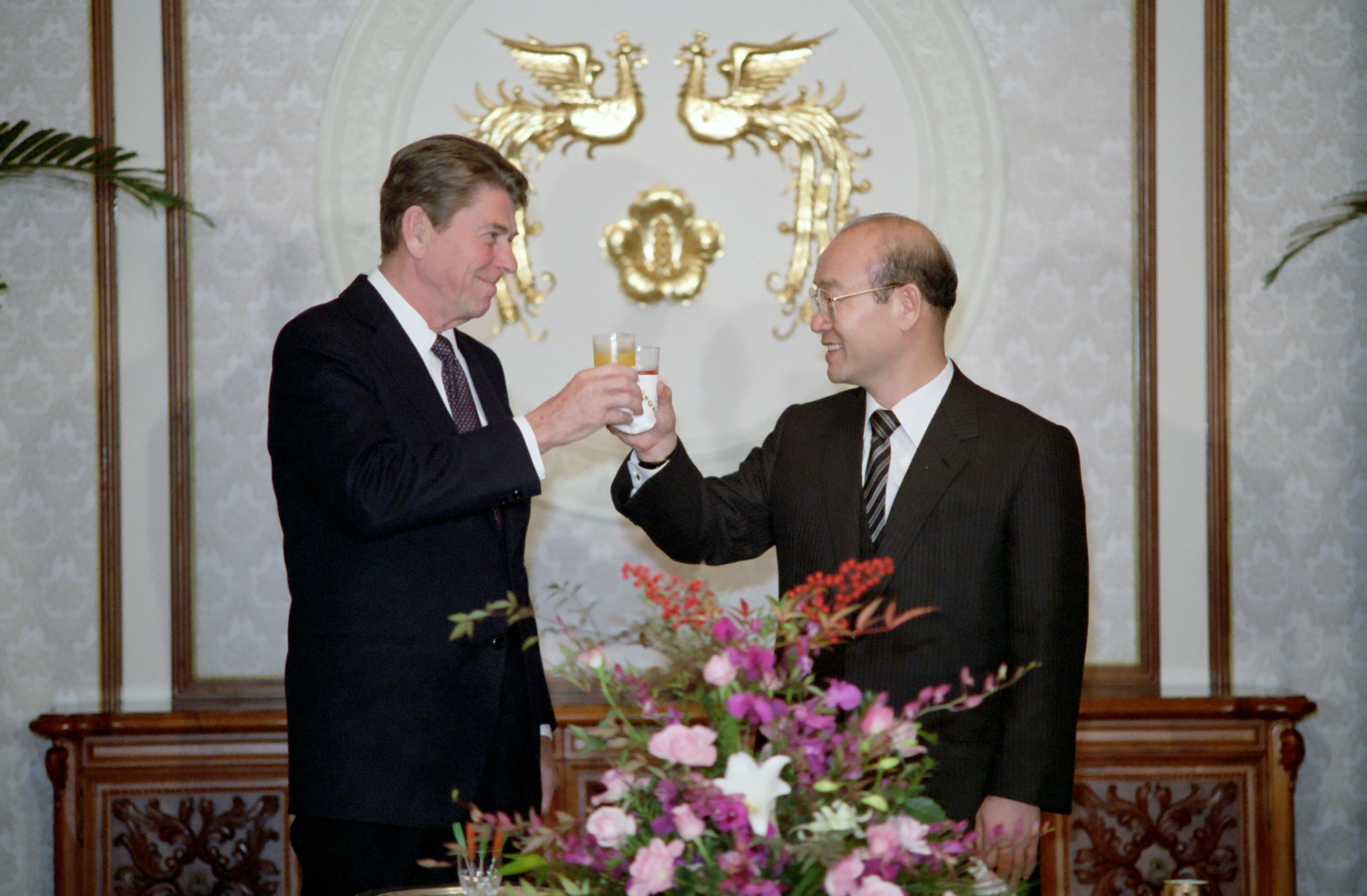
South Korean President Chun Doo-hwan with U.S. President Ronald Reagan in Seoul, November 1983

The government promised a new era of economic growth and democratic justice. Tight monetary laws and low interest rates contributed to price stability and helped the economy boom with notable growth in the electronics, semi-conductor, and automobile industries. The country opened up to foreign investments and GDP rose as Korean exports increased. This rapid economic growth, however, widened the gap between the rich and the poor, the urban and rural regions, and also exacerbated inter-regional conflicts. These dissensions, added to the hard-line measures taken against opposition to the government, fed intense rural and student movements, which had continued since the beginning of the republic.

In foreign policy, ties with Japan were strengthened by state visits by Chun to Japan and Japanese Prime Minister Yasuhiro Nakasone to Korea. U.S. President Ronald Reagan also paid a visit, and relations with the Soviet Union and China improved. The relationship with North Korea was strained when in 1983 a terrorist bomb attack in Burma killed 17 high-ranking officials attending memorial ceremonies and North Korea was alleged to be behind the attacks. However, in 1980 North Korea had submitted a "one nation, two system" reunification proposal which was met with a suggestion from the South to meet and prepare a unification constitution and government through a referendum. The humanitarian issue of reuniting separated families was dealt with first, and in September 1985, families from both sides of the border made cross visits to Seoul and Pyongyang in an historic event.

Seoul Arts Center

The government made many efforts for cultural development: the National Museum of Korea, Seoul Arts Center, and National Museum of Contemporary Art were all constructed during this time. The 1986 Asian Games were held successfully, and the bid for the 1988 Summer Olympics in Seoul was successful as well.

Despite economic growth and success in diplomatic relations, the government that gained power by coup d'état was essentially a military regime and the public's support and trust in it was low when the promises for democratic reform never materialized. In the 1985 National Assembly elections, opposition parties won more votes than the government party, clearly indicating that the public wanted a change. Many started to sympathize with the protesting students. The Gwangju massacre was never forgotten and in January 1987, when a protesting Seoul National University student died under police interrogation, public fury was immense. In April 1987, President Chun made a declaration that measures would be taken to protect the current constitution, instead of reforming it to allow for the direct election of the president. This announcement consolidated and strengthened the opposition; in June 1987, more than a million students and citizens participated in the nationwide anti-government protests of the June Democratic Struggle.

On 29 June 1987, the government's presidential nominee Roh Tae-woo gave in to the demands and announced the June 29 Declaration, which called for the holding of direct presidential elections and restoration of civil rights. In October 1987 a revised Constitution was approved by a national referendum and direct elections for a new president were held in December, bringing the Fifth Republic to a close.

== Sixth Republic (1988–present) ==
The Sixth Republic was established on 25 February 1988 and remains the current—and by far the longest-lasting—polity of South Korea.

=== Roh Tae-woo, 1988–1993 ===
Roh Tae-woo became president for the 13th presidential term in the first direct presidential election in 16 years. Although Roh was from a military background and one of the leaders of Chun's coup d'état, the inability of the opposition leaders Kim Dae-jung and Kim Young-sam to agree on a unified candidacy led to him being elected. The first female presidential candidate, Hong Sook-ja, even withdrew from the race in order to back Kim Young-sam against Roh.

Roh was officially inaugurated in February 1988. The government set out to eliminate past vestiges of authoritarian rule by revising laws and decrees to fit democratic provisions. Freedom of the press was expanded, university autonomy was recognised, and restrictions on overseas travel were lifted. However, the growth of the economy had slowed down compared to the 1980s, resulting in stagnant exports while commodity prices kept on rising.

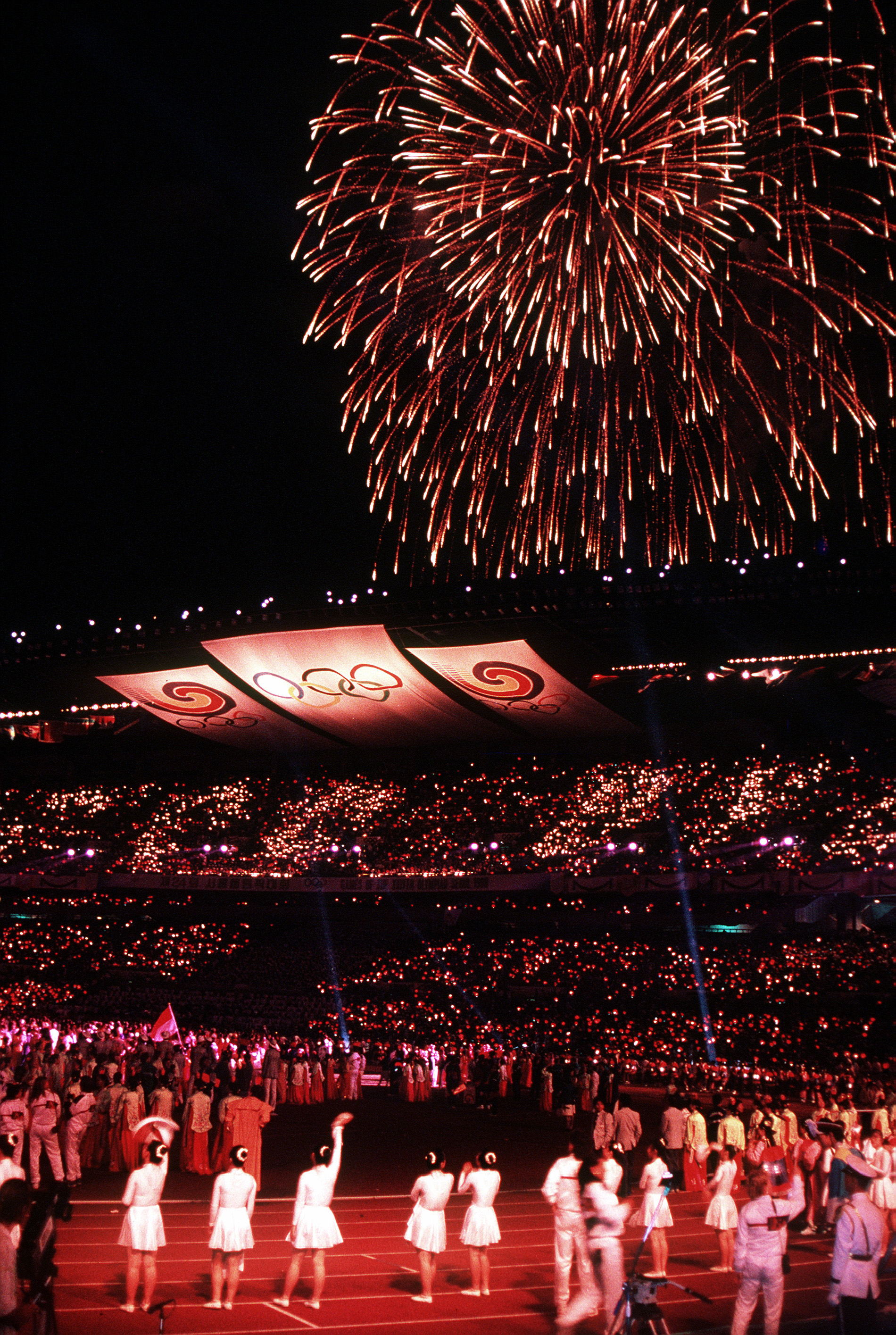
Fireworks during the closing ceremonies of the 1988 Summer Olympics

Shortly after Roh's inauguration, the 1988 Summer Olympics took place, raising South Korea's international recognition and greatly influencing foreign policy. Roh's government announced the official unification plan, Nordpolitik, and established diplomatic ties with the Soviet Union, China, and countries in Eastern Europe.

A historic event was held in 1990 when North Korea accepted the proposal for exchange between the two Koreas, resulting in high-level talks and cultural and sports exchanges. In 1991, a joint communiqué on denuclearization was agreed upon, and the two Koreas simultaneously became members of the UN.

=== Kim Young-sam, 1993–1998 ===
Kim Young-sam was elected president in the 1992 elections after Roh's tenure. He was the country's first civilian president in 30 years since 1962 and promised to build a "New Korea". The government set out to address the authoritarianism of the previous administrations. Local government elections were held in 1995, and parliamentary elections followed in 1996. In response to popular demand, former presidents Chun and Roh were both indicted on charges linked to bribery, illegal funds, and, in the case of Chun, responsibility for the Gwangju Uprising. They were tried and sentenced to prison in December 1996.

Relations with the North improved, and a summit meeting was planned but postponed indefinitely with the death of Kim Il Sung. Tensions varied between the two Koreas after that, with cycles of small military skirmishes and apologies. The government also carried out substantial financial and economic reforms, joining the OECD in 1996, but encountered difficulties with political and financial scandals involving his son. The country also faced a variety of catastrophes: the Gupo Station rail accident and the sinking of MV Seohae in 1993, the Seongsu Bridge disaster in 1994, and the Sampoong Department Store collapse in 1995.

In 1997, the nation suffered a severe financial crisis, and the government approached the International Monetary Fund for relief. Opposition leader Kim Dae-jung won the presidency that year, a first for the country.

=== Kim Dae-jung 1998–2003 ===
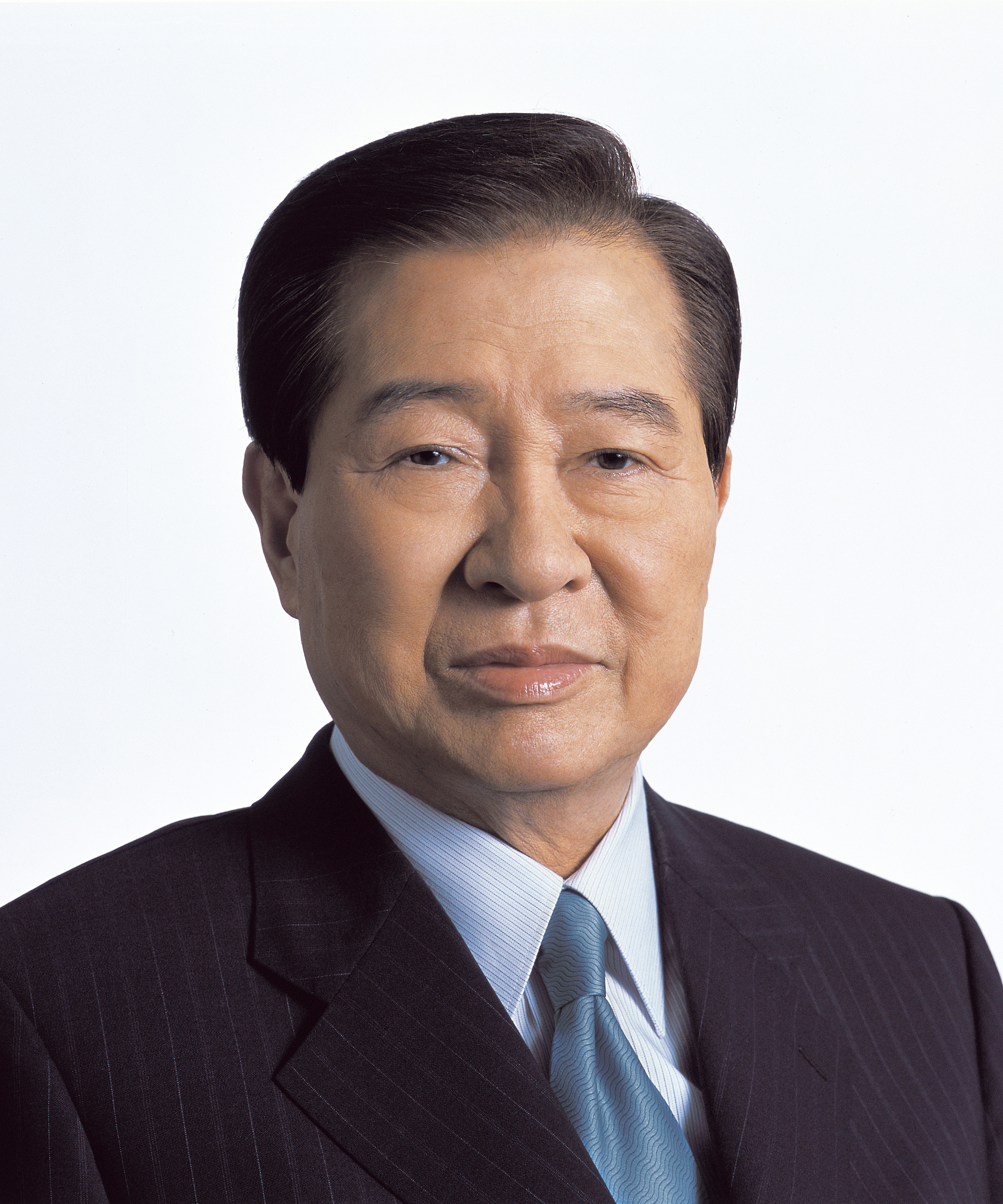
President Kim Dae-jung, the 2000 Nobel Peace Prize recipient for advancing democracy and human rights in South Korea and East Asia and for reconciliation with North Korea, was sometimes called the "Nelson Mandela of Asia."

In February 1998, Kim Dae-jung was officially inaugurated. South Korea had maintained its commitment to democratize its political processes and this was the first transfer of the government between parties by peaceful means. Kim's government faced the daunting task of overcoming the economic crisis, but with the joint efforts of the government's aggressive pursuit of foreign investment, cooperation from the industrial sector, and the citizen's gold-collecting campaign, the country was able to come out of the crisis in a relatively short period of time.

Industrial reconstruction of the big conglomerate chaebols was pursued, a national pension system was established in 1998, educational reforms were carried out, government support for the IT field was increased, and notable cultural properties were registered as UNESCO Cultural Heritage sites. The 2002 FIFA World Cup, co-hosted with Japan, was a major cultural event where millions of supporters gathered to cheer in public places.

In diplomacy, Kim Dae-jung pursued the "Sunshine Policy", a series of efforts to reconcile with North Korea. This culminated in reunions of the separated families of the Korean War and a summit talk with North Korean leader Kim Jong Il. For these efforts, Kim Dae-jung was awarded the Nobel Peace Prize in 2000.

=== Roh Moo-hyun, 2003–2008 ===
Roh Moo-hyun was elected to the presidency in December 2002 by direct election. His victory came with much support from the younger generation and civic groups who had hopes of participatory democracy, and Roh's administration consequently launched with the motto of "participation government". Unlike the previous governments, the administration decided to take a long-term view and execute market-based reforms gradually. This approach did not please the public: approval ratings fell by the end of 2003.

The Roh administration succeeded in overcoming regionalism in South Korean politics, diluting the collusive ties between politics and business, empowering civil society, settling the South Korea-United States trade disagreement, continuing summit talks with North Korea, and launching the high-speed train system KTX. But despite a boom in the stock market, youth unemployment rates were high, real estate prices skyrocketed, and the economy lagged.

In March 2004, the National Assembly voted to impeach Roh regarding breach of election laws and corruption. This motion rallied his supporters and affected the outcome of the parliamentary election held in April, with the ruling party becoming the majority. Roh was reinstated in May by the Constitutional Court, which had overturned the verdict. However, the ruling party then lost its majority in by-elections in 2005, as discontinued reform plans, continual labor unrest, Roh's personal feuds with the media, and diplomatic friction with the United States and Japan caused criticism of the government's competence on political and socioeconomic issues and on foreign affairs.

In April 2009, after leaving office, Roh Moo-hyun and his family members were investigated for bribery and corruption; Roh denied the charges. On 23 May 2009, Roh committed suicide by jumping into a ravine.

=== Lee Myung-bak, 2008–2013 ===
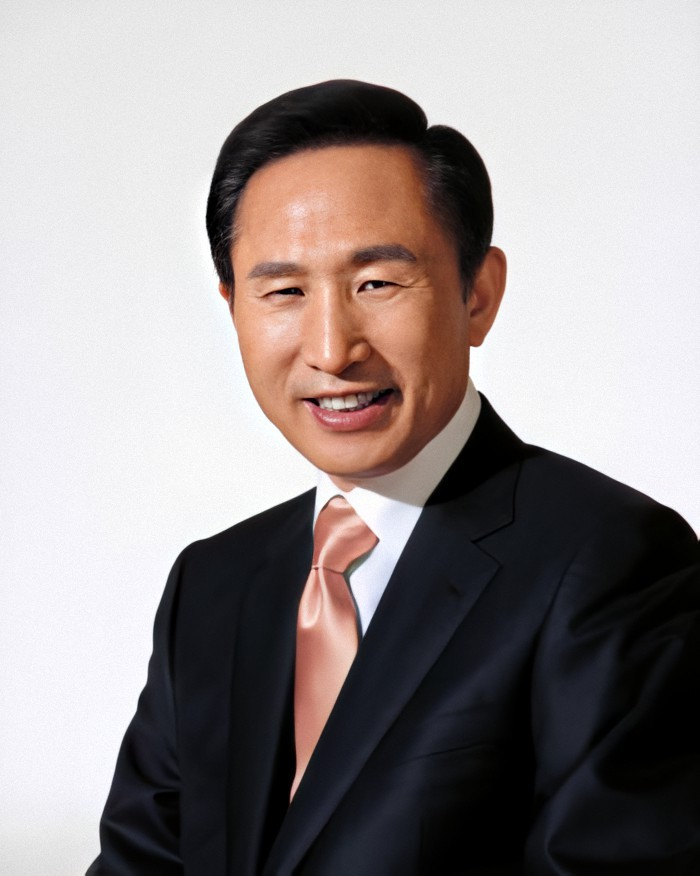
Lee Myung-bak, President of South Korea from 2008 to 2013

Roh's successor, Lee Myung-bak, was inaugurated in February 2008. Stating "creative pragmatism" as a guiding principle, Lee's administration set out to revitalize the flagging economy, re-energize diplomatic ties, stabilize social welfare, and meet the challenges of globalization. In April 2008, the ruling party secured a majority in the National Assembly elections. Also that month, summit talks with the United States addressed the Korea-US Free Trade Agreement and helped ease tensions between the two countries caused by the previous administrations. Lee agreed to lift the ban on US beef imports, which caused massive protests and demonstrations in the months that followed, as paranoia of potential mad cow disease gripped the country.

Many issues plagued the government, starting from the arson of the Namdaemun gates, in which the government was accused of not providing adequate security. Further controversies arose over the years regarding the appointment of high-ranking government officials, rampant political conflicts, accusations of oppression of media, and strained diplomatic relationships with North Korea and Japan. The global recession affected the economy as the worst economic crisis since 1997 hit the country. The Lee administration tackled these issues by actively issuing statements, reshuffling the cabinet, and implementing administrative and industrial reforms.

The economy bounced back after regulatory and economic reforms, with the country's economy marking growth and recovering from the global recession. The administration also pursued improved diplomatic relations by holding summit talks with the United States, China, and Japan and participating in the ASEAN-ROK Commemorative Summit to strengthen ties with other Asian countries. The 2010 G20 summit was held in Seoul, where issues regarding the global economic crisis were discussed.

In October 2020, South Korea's Supreme Court upheld a 17-year prison sentence for former president Lee Myung-bak because of taking bribes before and during his presidency.

=== Park Geun-hye, 2013–2017 ===
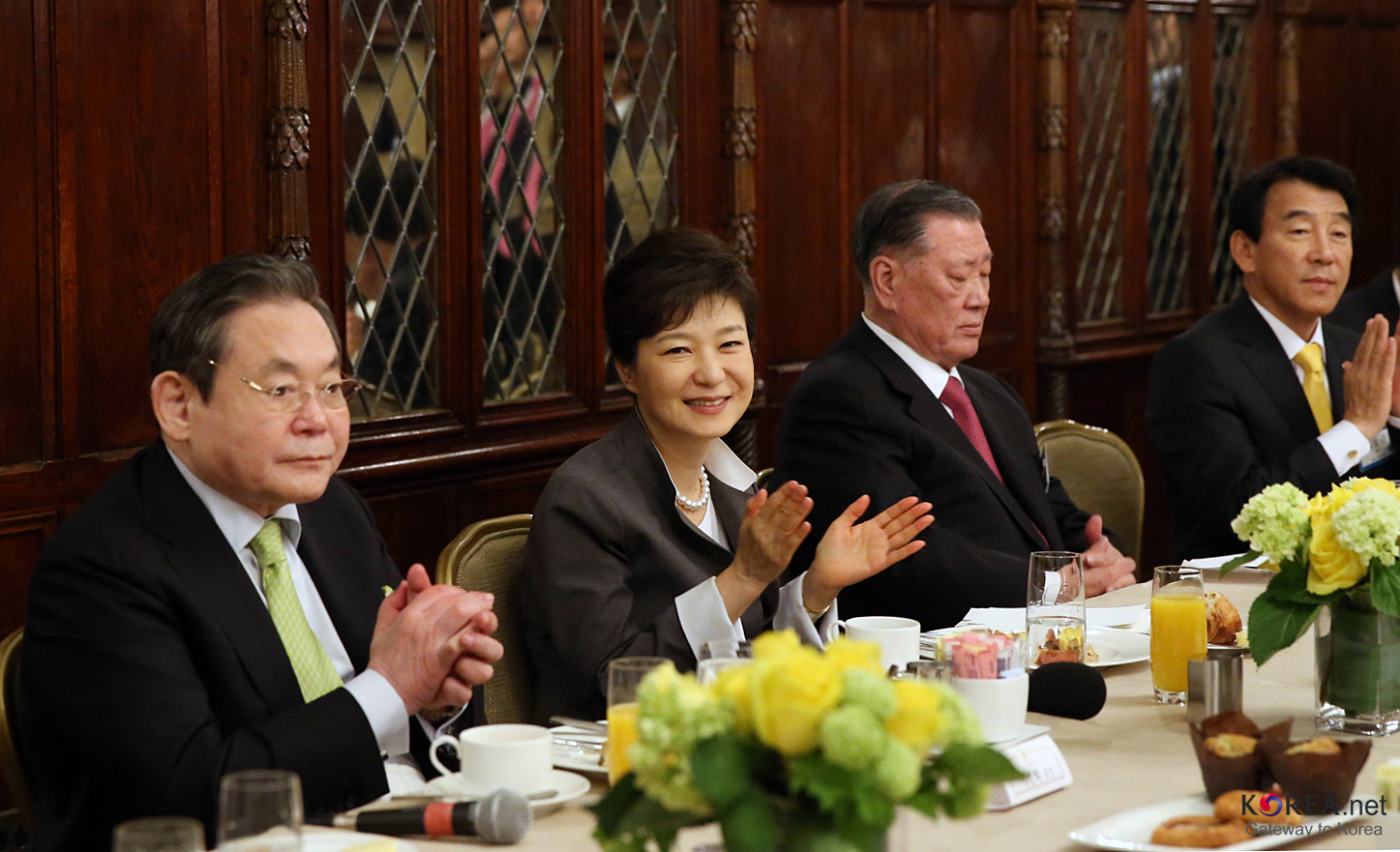
President Park Geun-hye with chaebol business magnates Lee Kun-hee and Chung Mong-koo, May 2013

Park Geun-hye was inaugurated in February 2013. She was the eleventh President of South Korea and is the eldest child of South Korea's stratocratic third President, Park Chung Hee. She was the first woman to be elected South Korean president, and to be elected as a head of state in the modern history of Northeast Asia. Her reputation during her presidency was eventually marred by her incompetency of handling the Sewol ferry disaster, the 2015 MERS outbreak, and later a major scandal, leading to her impeachment in December 2016. The corruption scandal involving Choi Soon-sil quickly blew up after reports from multiple news organizations (the most notable of which was JTBC) in 2016, nationwide protests ensued weekly, with participant count hitting a maximum of over 2.3 million (as reported by the protesters). These protests turned out to be the biggest mass protests in Korean history. The protests continued even after Congress voted on Park's impeachment. Prime Minister Hwang Kyo-ahn acted as President of South Korea pending completion of investigations into the actions of Park Geun-hye, and in the absence of any intervening election. The Constitutional Court upheld the impeachment on 10 March 2017, ending Park's presidency and forcing her out of office.

In April 2018, former president Park Geun-hye was sentenced to 24 years in jail because of abuse of power and corruption.

=== Moon Jae-in, 2017–2022 ===
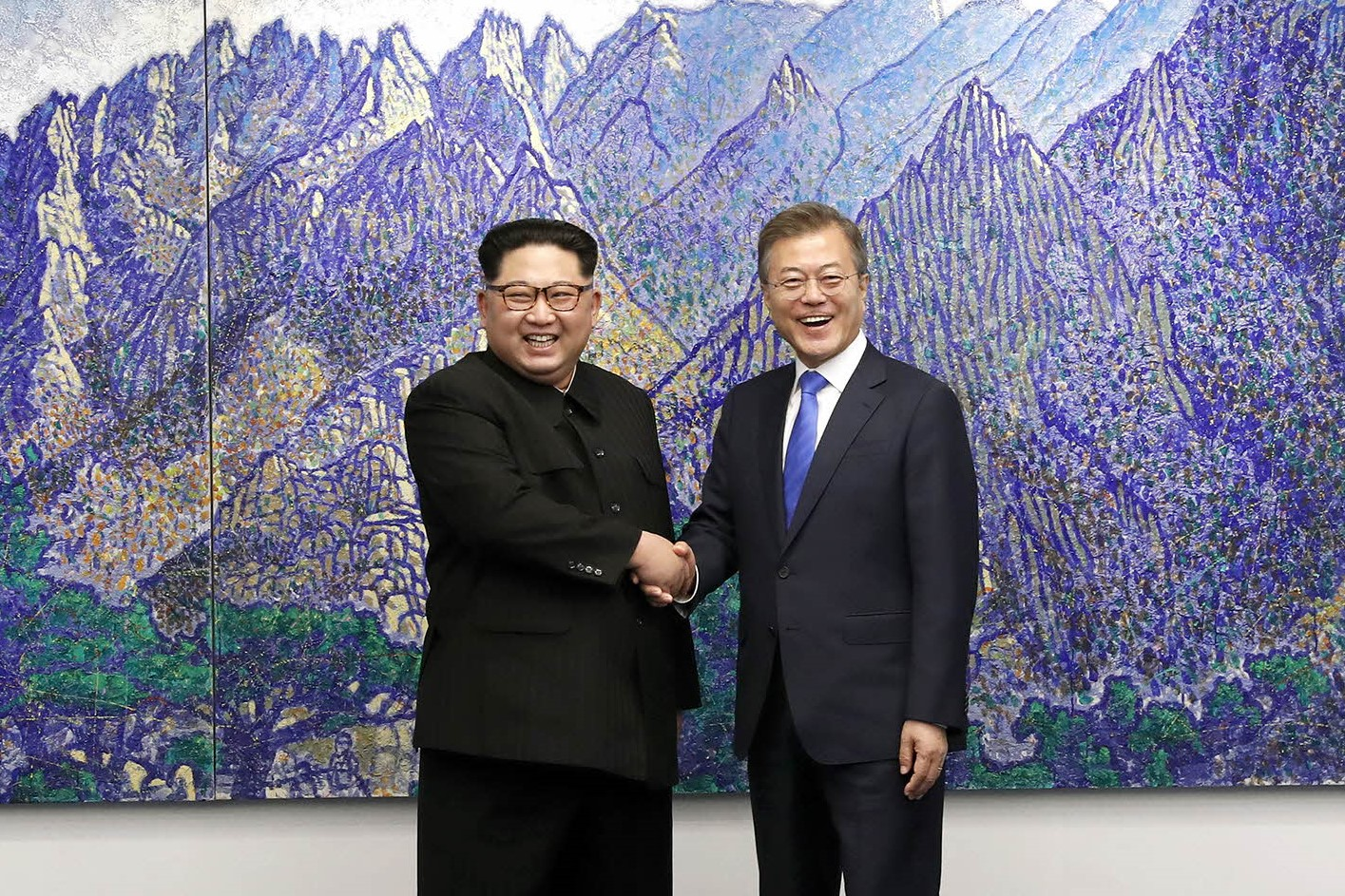
North Korean leader Kim Jong Un and South Korean President Moon Jae-in shaking hands inside the Peace House on 27 April 2018

Moon Jae-in was inaugurated on 10 May 2017. As President, his tenure saw an improving political relationship with North Korea, some increasing divergence in the military alliance with the United States, and the successful hosting of the Winter Olympics in Pyeongchang. Moon Jae-in met with North Korean chairman Kim Jong Un at the April 2018 inter-Korean summit, May 2018 inter-Korean summit, and September 2018 inter-Korean summit. During the COVID-19 outbreak, President Moon had gained a positive reputation both domestically and internationally with the initial successes of controlling the outbreak. Subsequent outbreaks in 2021, however, caused his ratings to plummet. As of 2021, South Korea recorded more deaths than births, resulting in a population decline for the first time on record.

In April 2020, President Moon's Democratic party won a landslide victory in parliamentary elections. It took 180 seats in the 300-member National Assembly with its allies. The opposition People Power Party (UFP) won 103 seats.

President Moon finished his term on 9 May 2022. His successor, People Power Party candidate Yoon Suk-yeol, took over the seat on 10 May 2022 after winning narrowly the 2022 South Korean presidential election.

=== Yoon Suk Yeol, 2022–2025 ===
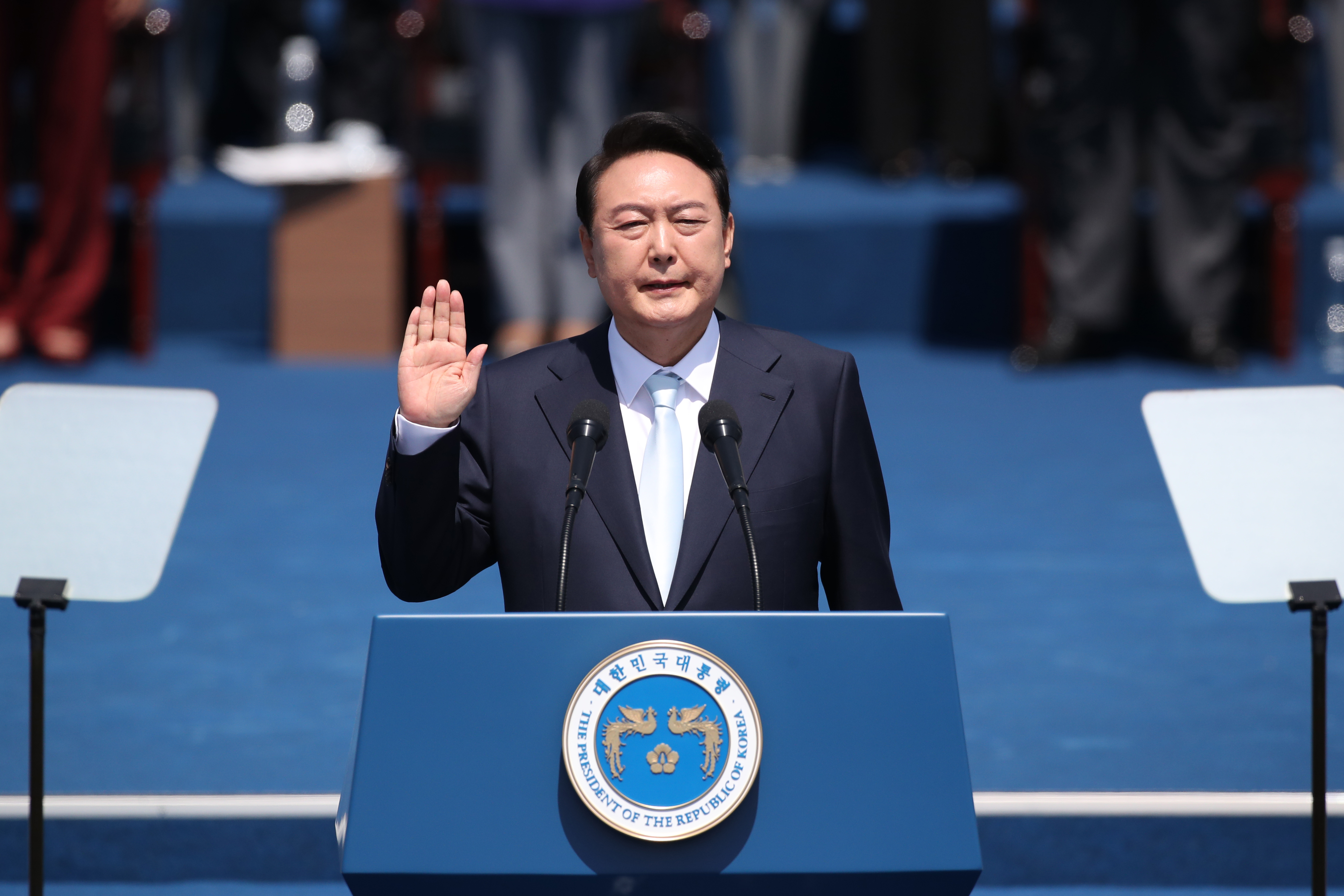
Yoon takes the presidential oath of office outside the National Assembly, 10 May 2022.

On 29 October 2022, at least 153 people were crushed to death when a crowd surged in an alleyway during Halloween festivities in Seoul's Itaewon district. President Yoon declared a state of official national mourning.

The "Unification Act on the Calculation of Age" took effect on 28 June 2023. The "Unification Act on the Calculation of Age" was promoted to resolve social and administrative confusion and disputes arising from mixing various age calculation methods. It is President Yoon Suk Yeol's representative presidential election pledge and the 13th of the 120 state affairs of the Yoon Suk Yeol government.

In the 22nd National Assembly election held on 10 April 2024, the People Power Party to which Yoon Suk Yeol belongs won 108 out of 300 seats, while the opposition Democratic Party of Korea won 175.

In June 2024, South Korea suspended the 2018 military agreement with North Korea.

On 3 December 2024, Yoon enacted martial law to rid the opposition of 'Anti-State Influence'. Following a few hours of unrest, the National Assembly unanimously passed a motion to lift martial law. Many hours of protest later, with the army unable to stand down without presidential authority, Yoon lifted his prior declaration of martial law and ordered the military to stand down.

Yoon was subsequently impeached on 14 December by the National Assembly and suspended from office pending a final ruling by the Constitutional Court on whether to confirm his removal from the presidency.

On 29 December 2024, Jeju Air plane crash at Muan International Airport in South Korea killed 179 people, being the deadliest air disaster on the nation's soil.

On 4 April 2025, in a unanimous 8-0 verdict, the Constitutional Court upheld Yoon's impeachment, formally removing him from office and laying the groundwork for a new Presidential election to be held later that year.

=== Lee Jae-myung, 2025–present ===
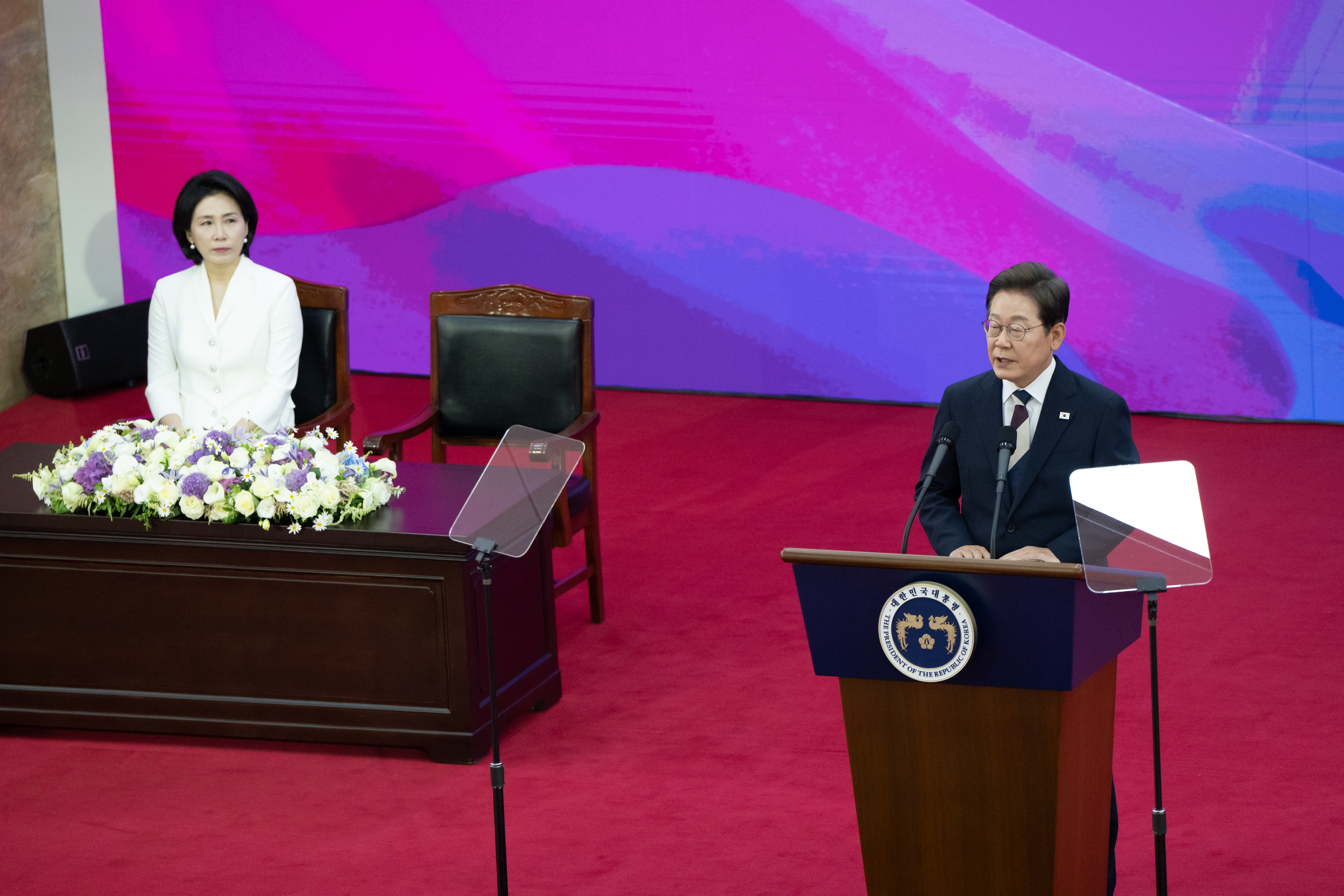
Inauguration of the 21st President of South Korea Lee Jae-myung.

On 4 June 2025, Lee Jae-myung was sworn in as South Korea's new president after having won a snap election by 49.4% of the vote as the candidate of Democratic Party.

On 19 February 2026, former president Yoon Suk-yeol was convicted of leading an insurrection, and sentenced to life imprisonment. Former Prime Minister Han Duck-soo was sentenced to 23 years in jail in relation to the martial law declaration.

== Timeline ==
Timeline of South Korean governments

== See also ==
- Elections in South Korea
- History of Asia
- History of East Asia
- History of North Korea
- History of Korea
- List of presidents of South Korea
- Politics of South Korea
- Prehistoric Korea
