= South Korean International Monetary Fund Agreement, 1997 =

South Korean IMF Agreement
- Date: 02.11.1997
- Duration: 1997-2001 (3 Year)
- Location: South Korea
- In November 1997 during the Kim Young-sam administration, Korea received funding from the International Monetary Fund (IMF) due to a lack of foreign exchange reserves.

The South Korean International Monetary Fund Agreement was implemented when South Korea, which was in a foreign exchange crisis, signed a memorandum of understanding with the International Monetary Fund on December 3, 1997. The country's chaebols, or large conglomerates, had engaged in poor business management and overborrowing, and the government had been supporting the chaebols' financial practices when the Asian financial crisis began. The IMF required the introduction of a range of policies (such as fiscal and financial austerity, high-interest rates, the dissolution of the chaebols, layoffs, and implementation of floating exchange rates) as conditions for the bailout. The South Korean government under Kim Young-sam accepted those conditions to stave off a crisis. As a result, corporate bankruptcies, mass unemployment, and a crisis in the real economy accelerated.

== Description ==
Through the South Korean government's strong export policy, its economy succeeded in achieving a feat of surpassing $10,000 per capita income and transforming the poor agricultural economy into an advanced industrial economy by achieving an annual average growth of 8.4% for 25 years from 1970 to 1996. However, such a government-led economic management system pushed for social corruption and inefficiency in resource allocation through collusion between politics and business, and further deepened imbalances between classes, industries, and regions. In addition, regulatory and protection-based industrial policies had hindered corporate innovation, weakening competitiveness.

The real-name financial system, which was introduced in 1993 for the purpose of preventing corruption and realizing tax equity, had become more dysfunctional than net functions, such as promoting the over-consumption and the overseas outflow of wealth and deepening financial difficulties of small and medium-sized companies. The measures to expand the market opening following the entry of the OECD in 1996 served as a destabilizing factor for the Korean economy, which was unfamiliar with the market economy and structurally weak.

Foreign investors began to leave one by one, taking a dim view of the future prospects of the Korean economy, as large companies went bankrupt early in 1997 and the currency crisis in Southeast Asian countries triggered in Thailand in May.

Under these conditions, the Republic of Korea was forced to request and receive a bailout from the IMF in late 1997 when it drove into a sovereign default crisis due to the inability to settle external debts caused by the depletion of its foreign exchange reserves.

== Causes ==
=== Deterioration of the financial system ===
After Hanbo Group's bankruptcy in early 1997, a series of bankruptcies of large companies such as Sammi and Jinro continued. The bankruptcy domino of such large companies was attributed to excessive investment in certain industrial sectors by external borrowing and worsening financial conditions stemming from falling profitability in the prolonged economic slump.

As of the end of September 1997, financial institutions' bad loans (non-profit assets) reached about 32 trillion won, or 7 per cent of GDP, doubling from the end of 1996. At the same time, the rapid decline in stock prices led to a fall in the value of stocks held by banks, which also led to a sharp drop in the value of banks' net assets.

As a result, a series of bankruptcies of companies accelerated the insolvency of financial institutions, which immediately led to a decline in Korea's external credibility, leading to a series of the downgrade of the credit ratings of Korean financial institutions by international credit rating agencies such as S&P and Moody's, which led to a substantial suspension of raising new foreign currency funds and the extension of the maturity of relatively large short-term loans.

=== Transmitting the effect of the Southeast Asian monetary crisis ===
Given the fundamental factors behind the Southeast Asian currency crisis, which erupted in Thailand in May 1997 and had spread to Indonesia, the Philippines, and Malaysia since July, it was also a widening deficit in the current account and slowing economic growth.

In the case of Thailand, the country had achieved high annual economic growth of 8% over the past decade from the late 1980s to 1995, and in 1992, the foreign capital had been flooding in due to capital liberalization measures. However, rather than capital being invested in industries, much of the capital flowed into the real estate market and the stock market, causing property prices to soar and stock prices to soar. As the economy went downhill in 1996, the economic bubble led to a sharp drop in real estate prices and insolvency of companies and banks, leading to a currency meltdown as foreign capital began to slip away in one by one.

Such a "coordination phenomenon" might be attributed to increased interdependence in real life, including trade and investment, among countries, but it would be more likely to cause capital outflows (called Hot Money) including hedge funds and other speculative short-term funds as financial and capital liberalization around the world advanced in the 1990s.

== History ==
=== Key events and description ===
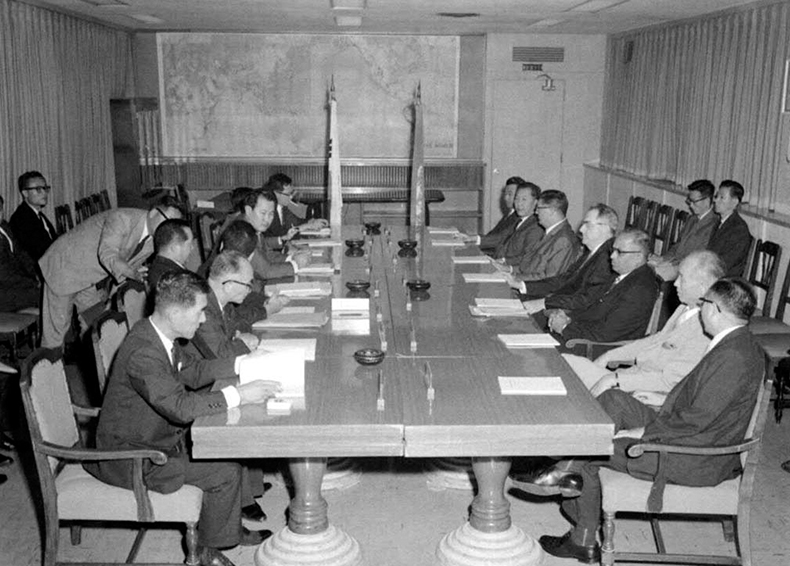
* Economic Council of Korea and the IMF

Step 1. Before IMF funding (1)

- An export economy centred on the light industry (the 1960s) → Fostering heavy and chemical industries (the mid-1980s)
- Accumulated current account deficits and increased external debt between 1994 and 1997
- The occurrence of a series of bankruptcies of large corporates after the early 1997s
- Recovering temporary stability in the financial market in May and June
- 2 July 1997: The abandonment of Thailand's multiple-currency basket exchange rate system

Step 2. Before IMF funding (2)

- 15 July 1997: Agreement to suspend bankruptcy of Kia which was one of ten major companies
- 11 September 1997: Korea Development Bank succeeded in issuing $1.5 billion foreign currency bonds
- Southeast Asian financial crisis spread across Asia at the end of October
- During November 1997: Rapid reduction in foreign exchange reserves, facing a crisis of sovereign default

Step 3. Negotiation with the IMF (major agreement)

- Macro-political field: Focusing on improving current account and attracting foreign investment smoothly
- Financial restructuring: Comprehensive restructuring to operate the financial system more soundly and efficiently
- Corporate restructuring: Improvement of corporate financial structure, reduction of bank borrowing costs during corporate financing, etc.
- Liberalization/opening policy: Full promotion of trade liberalization, foreign exchange liberalization and capital liberalization
- Reform of labor-management relations: Increase of flexibility in the labor market, strengthen the function of the employment insurance system

== Restoration ==
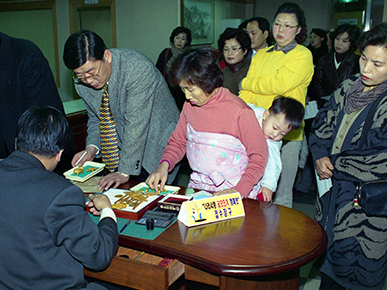
A gold collecting campaign

=== Step 1. Instrument for resolving the initial shortage of foreign currency liquidity ===
- Negotiation on extending the maturity of short-term foreign debts of financial companies
  - Continuing to collect funds from foreign financial institutions: 12. 1997-Roll-over Ratio Falling Rapidly
  - Banks lost their ability to repay foreign debts and the government was unable to support them due to a decrease in their reserves.
  - 10 December 1997: The government had decided to pursue a collective debt restructuring with foreign banks to prevent a sovereign default → immediately begun consultations with the IMF
  - Recognizing the seriousness of the situation in the United States, the White House and the Countermeasure Conference under President Clinton was held.
  - Request for cooperation to Major Wall Street Banks and Finance Ministers of Major Developed Countries
- The government's successful issuance of foreign exchange stabilization bonds
  - The Korean government sought to issue the first foreign exchange stabilization bonds in April 1998.
  - In addition to the IMF fund, 4 billion dollars was raised in Korea's own capacity, and the introduction of funds for issuing foreign bonds on April 17, 1998: Foreign reserves exceeded $30 billion for the first time since the financial crisis in late 1997
- A gold-collecting campaign
  - November 1997 after applying for IMF bailout: A "gold-collecting campaign" was launched in early 1998 amid the voluntary and active participation of the entire nation.

=== Step 2. Implementation of the IMF Program-Structural reform in four major sectors: finance, business, public and labor ===
==== Financial sector ====
- Improvement of the system for financial restructuring
- Cleaning up large-scale insolvent financial companies: Exiting, transmutation of assets and liabilities (P&A), merger

==== Corporate Sector ====
Criteria	Content
Promoting Institutional Reform in accordance with Corporate Restructuring	Improving transparency in management: Improving governance structure, including the introduction of outside directors and audit committees, strengthening accounting and disclosure systems, etc. Innovative improvement of financial structure: 200% of the debt ratio, tax disadvantages on over-borrowing, etc. The concentration of core competencies: Tax support for business restructuring, such as reorganization of the 3 Act on Bankruptcy, allowing hostile M&As, merger and division, etc. Resolution of mutual payment guarantees: Prohibition of debt guarantees by large business groups Strengthen responsibility of controlling shareholders and management: New regulations on directors' loyalty, the introduction of de facto director system, incineration of stocks by shareholders who provide cause for company cleanup, etc.; Complementary principles such as improving management governance in the secondary financial sector, blocking cross-shareholdings and unfair internal transactions, and prohibiting irregular inheritance and gifts of wealth
Establishing a Corporate Restructuring Promotion System Focused on Bond Financial Institutions	Enactment and implementation of the Financial Structure Improvement Agreement between creditor financial institutions and the top 30 groups in February 1998 Bond financial institutions' judgment of corporate insolvency in June 1998 Corporate improvement work in July 1998 Special credit risk inspection for potential non-performing companies in November 2000 Establishment of the "Business Credit Risk Assessment System" for each bank in March 2001 Enactment and enforcement of the Corporate Restructuring Promotion Act in July 2001
The spread of qualitative changes in the corporate sector	The spread of cash flow, profitability, and shareholder-centred management climate

==== Labor and public sector ====
- Labor: Formation of 'labor-management committee' to mediate conflicts between labor and management (January 1998)
- Public: To carry out two rounds of government reorganization and privatization of state-run enterprises
- Expanding the social stability network and supporting small and medium enterprises and venture businesses
  - Preparation of 'comprehensive unemployment measures' in March 1998
  - Establishing a Social Safety Net
  - Implementation of the national basic living security system
  - Focusing on fostering small and medium enterprises and expanding support
  - Support for revitalizing venture businesses to create jobs and revitalize the economy
- Promoting trade, capital and foreign exchange liberalization
  - Trade liberalization - Abolition of various grants and reserves
  - Capital liberalization
    - - Full opening of the short-term financial market—Open to foreigners, including corporate/commercial/trade notes, bank transferable deposit certificates and short-term government bonds
    - - Allow foreigners to invest heavily in domestic financial companies-Allow foreign banks and securities firms to set up subsidiaries, abolish the total limit on a foreign stock investment, and allow foreigners to acquire domestic stocks freely
    - - Increases the proportion of foreign investment by domestic companies
  - Promoting foreign exchange liberalization
    - Revision of the existing "Foreign Currency Management Act" to "Foreign Currency Transaction Act" in September 1998.
    - April 1, 1999 - 1st phase of liberalization : All restrictions on current transactions related to the company's external business activities were lifted, the capital transaction was converted into freedom policy and Negative System
    - The End of 2000 - 2nd phase of liberalization : Abolition of regulations on all current payment transactions and the capital transactions other than International Criminal Court, Money Laundering, Gambling, UN Economic Sanctions, etc.
    - Establishing supplementary measures according to the government's liberalization measures - Safe Guards: In the event of a financial crisis : ①Temporary suspension of foreign exchange transactions; ②Central Bank Concentration of Foreign Exchange; ③Capital Transaction Permit System

=== Step 3. Early repayment of IMF borrowing and IMF graduation ===
- Agreement to terminate policy consultation with the IMF for three years in June 2000

== Effects of the South Korean IMF Agreement ==
Entering the IMF's management system, the Korean economy faced a new era of low 2 (low growth, low wages), high 4 (high prices, high-interest rates, high exchange rates, high unemployment)

- The South Korean government
  - Regulatory and interference-oriented policy enforcement had become more difficult
  - Regulations and interference had been kept to a minimum and left to market principles so as to revive the creativity of the private sector and enhance economic efficiency
  - Modifying the growth-oriented expansion model that led to the Korean economy and converting it into a macro model compliant with the IMF requirements
- Corporate industries
  - The IMF had required the preparation of consolidated financial statements and mutual payment guarantees among affiliates to enhance the corporate transparency and internalize management
  - Accounting principles that meet international standards had been adhered and restructuring to specialize in the industry had been hurried
- Financial industries
  - The closure, acquisition and merger of insolvent financial institutions were occurred around the end of the fund as required by the IMF to stabilize the financial system, followed by massive store cuts and personnel reorganization
- Household
  - Households' purchasing power had been greatly reduced due to wage cuts and reduced real income due to high prices
  - Soaring daily necessities and service prices, as well as increased interest burdens on external borrowing due to high-interest rates
  - A restrained consumer life set for declining purchasing power
