= Kim Daetongryung =

김 대통령, meaning President Kim, may refer to following presidents of South Korea:

- Kim Young-sam (1927–2015), 7th president of South Korea
- Kim Dae-jung (1924–2009), 8th president of South Korea
