= Hong Sook-ja =

South Korean diplomat (born 1933)

- 홍숙자

Personal details
- Born: June 25, 1933 (age 91); Keijō, Korea, Empire of Japan
- Spouse: Cheon Juhwa (m. 1958; div. 1965)
- Children: Cheon Inbeom
- Education: Dongguk University (BA); Ewha Womans University (MA); Boston University (MA); Dongguk University (PhD)

- Hong Sook-ja
- Hangul: 홍숙자
- Hanja: 洪淑子
- RR: Hong Sukja
- MR: Hong Sukcha

Hong Sook-ja (Korean: 홍숙자; born June 25, 1933) is a South Korean activist, politician, and writer. She was appointed South Korea's first female diplomat and later became the first female presidential candidate to enter the electoral foray, having done so in South Korea's first democratic elections in 1987.

== Early life ==
Hong was born on June 25, 1933 in Keijō, Korea, Empire of Japan. After her birth, Hong's mother was put under increasing pressure from family members to give birth to a son, which included offers to find her husband a concubine. Hong's younger brother was eventually born, but Hong recalls this as influencing her understanding of male and female inequality.

She graduated at Dongguk University in 1955 and at Boston University in 1958, having studied political science and international affairs. She then worked for the South Korean foreign ministry and became vice consul of the Korean Consulate in New York City in 1965. She was professor at Dongguk University since 1979. From 1986 to 1988 she was president of the International Council of Women.

== Run as presidential candidate ==
On 11 November 1987, the Social Democratic Party held their 13th presidential election nomination provisional convention and elected Hong as their presidential candidate. She was thus listed as the first female presidential candidate in the Republic of Korea's Constitution.

On the day of her selection as the Social Democratic Party candidate, Hong gave a speech, saying that, "female presidents will create political miracles." She also promised to support direct elections but promote the cabinet system. Hong also said that she would encourage female ministers and promote bold policies for women's liberation. However, Hong was side-lined by the other male candidates, receiving little media attention. She bowed out of the presidential race on 5 December, explaining that she had never intended to become the Korean president. She was aware that the Social Democratic Party was not big and influential enough to make her president of South Korea, and she also acknowledged that it would not be possible for her to be elected president insofar as Korea was still a male-dominated society. Hong threw her support behind candidate Kim Young-sam, speaking at a rally, "the foremost task we are facing now is to terminate the military dictatorship. To that end, I decided to support the leading candidate, disregarding my ideological differences with him." However, Kim Young-sam lost to the general Roh Tae-woo, hand-picked heir of former military president Chun Doo-hwan.

== Selected works ==
- Hong Sook-ja, Toward the High Place (Korean: 저 높은 곳을 향하여; RR: Jeo nopeun goseul hyanghayeo), (Seoul: Yeobaek Media, 2006). ISBN 8958660236.
