= Kim Young-sam =

President of South Korea from 1993 to 1998

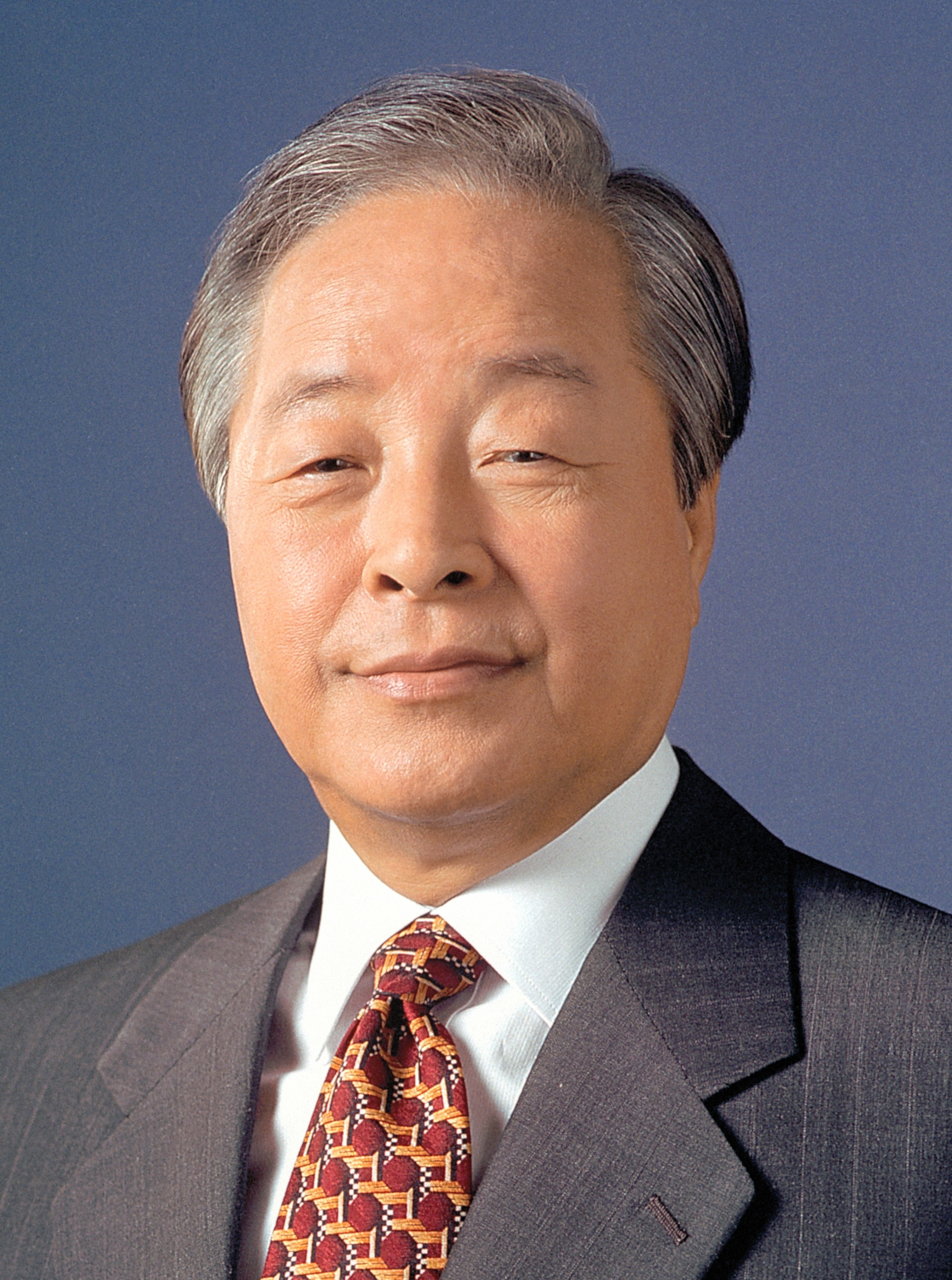
- Official portrait, 1993

7th President of South Korea
- In office 25 February 1993 – 24 February 1998
- Prime Minister: Hwang In-sung; Lee Hoi-chang; Chung Jai-suk (acting); Lee Yung-dug; Lee Hong-koo; Lee Soo-sung; Goh Kun
- Preceded by: Roh Tae-woo
- Succeeded by: Kim Dae-jung

President of the New Korea Party
- In office 28 August 1992 – 30 September 1997
- Preceded by: Roh Tae-woo
- Succeeded by: Lee Hoi-chang

President of the Reunification Democratic Party
- In office 12 May 1988 – 22 January 1990
- Preceded by: Kim Myung-yoon (acting)
- Succeeded by: Office abolished
- In office 1 May 1987 – 8 February 1988
- Preceded by: Office established
- Succeeded by: Kim Myung-yoon (acting)

President of the New Democratic Party
- In office 7 June 1979 – 27 October 1980
- Preceded by: Lee Chul-seung
- Succeeded by: Office abolished
- In office 21 August 1974 – 21 September 1976
- Preceded by: Kim Eui-taek
- Succeeded by: Lee Chul-seung

Member of the National Assembly
- In office 30 May 1992 – 13 October 1992
- Constituency: Proportional Representation
- In office 30 May 1988 – 29 May 1992
- Constituency: Seo, Busan
- In office 29 July 1960 – 4 October 1979 (expelled)
- Constituency: Busan Seo A, South Gyeongsang (1960-1963); Seo, Busan (1963-1973); Seo–Dong, Busan (1973-1979)
- In office 31 May 1954 – 30 May 1958
- Constituency: Tongyeong B, South Gyeongsang

Personal details
- Born: 20 December 1927 Geoje, Geojedo, Keishōnan Province, Korea, Empire of Japan
- Died: 22 November 2015 (aged 87) Seoul, South Korea
- Resting place: Seoul National Cemetery
- Party: See list: Liberal (1954); Independent (1954–1955); Democratic (1955–1960); Independent (1960); New Democratic (1960–1961); Independent (1961–1963); Civil Rule (1963–1965); People (1965–1967); New Democratic (1967–1969); Independent (1969); New Democratic (1969–1980); Independent (1980–1985); New Korean Democratic (1985–1987); Independent (1987); Reunification Democratic (1987–1990); Democratic Liberal/New Korea (1990–1997); Independent (1997–2015)
- Spouse: Son Myung-soon (m. 1951)
- Children: 6
- Education: Seoul National University (BA)

Military service
- Allegiance: South Korea
- Branch/service: Republic of Korea Army
- Rank: Student officer

Korean name
- Hangul: 김영삼
- Hanja: 金泳三
- RR: Gim Yeongsam
- MR: Kim Yŏngsam

Art name
- Hangul: 거산
- Hanja: 巨山
- RR: Geosan
- MR: Kŏsan
- Kim Young-sam's voice Kim Young-sam speaks on South Korea's relations with China; Recorded 31 October 1994

Kim Young-sam (Korean: 김영삼; Hanja: 金泳三; pronounced [kim.jʌŋ.sam]; 20 December 1927 – 22 November 2015) was a South Korean politician who served as the seventh President of South Korea from 1993 to 1998. Kim was the first civilian to serve as president in the country's history.

Born in Geoje during Japanese colonial rule, Kim graduated from Seoul National University in 1952 with a bachelor's degree in philosophy. From 1961, Kim spent almost 30 years as one of the leaders of the South Korean opposition and one of the most mainstream rivals to the authoritarian regimes of Park Chung Hee and Chun Doo-hwan. He was elected to the National Assembly at the age of 26, the youngest in Korean history, and served as a nine-term lawmaker, working as a leader with Kim Dae-jung and the democratic camp. His art name is Geosan (거산; 巨山) and his hometown is Gimnyeong (김녕; 金寧). Elected as president in the 1992 presidential election, Kim became the first civilian to hold the office in over 30 years. He was inaugurated on 25 February 1993, and served a single five-year term, presiding over a massive anti-corruption campaign, the arrest of his two predecessors, and an internationalization policy called Segyehwa.

The final years of Kim's presidency saw him being widely blamed for the collapse of the Seongsu Bridge and the Sampoong Department Store and the downturn and recession of the South Korean economy during the 1997 Asian financial crisis, which led South Korea to accept tens of billions of dollars in unpopular conditional loans from the International Monetary Fund (IMF). This caused him to have one of the lowest approval ratings of any incumbent president in the history of South Korea at 6%, from a historical high of 97%, until Park Geun-hye surpassed Kim at 1–3% during the political scandal in 2016. After his death, he has seen a moderately positive reevaluation.

== Early life and education ==
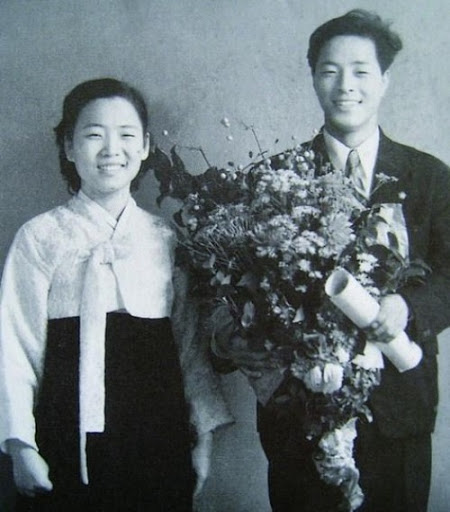
Marriage of Kim Young-sam and Son Myung-soon (1951)

Kim was born on 20 December 1927 in Geoje, Geojedo, Keishōnan Province, Korea, Empire of Japan (now in South Gyeongsang Province, South Korea). He was born into a rich fishing family. He was the eldest of one son and five daughters in his family. During the Korean War, Kim joined the ROK Army as a student soldier, then he served in the ROK Army as an officer of the Department of troop information and education. In 1952, he graduated with a Bachelor of Arts in Philosophy from Seoul National University.

== Early political career ==
In 1954, Kim was elected to the National Assembly of South Korea, as a member of the party led by Syngman Rhee, the first president of South Korea. At the time of his election, Kim was the youngest member of the national assembly. A few months after his electoral victory, Kim left his party and joined the opposition when Rhee attempted to amend the constitution of South Korea. Kim then became a leading critic, along with Kim Dae-jung, of the military governments of Park Chung Hee and Chun Doo-hwan.

In 1969, Kim fiercely opposed the constitutional revision to allow President Park to serve for three consecutive terms. Kim later opposed President Park's power grab with the authoritarian Yushin Constitution of 1972.

In 1971, Kim made his first attempt to run for president against Park as candidate for the opposition New Democratic Party, but Kim Dae-jung was selected as the candidate.

=== New Democratic Party leader ===
In 1974, he was elected as the president of the New Democratic Party. While he temporarily lost his power within the national assembly in 1976, Kim made a political comeback during the final year of Park Chung Hee's rule. Kim took a hardline policy of never compromising or cooperating with Park's Democratic Republican Party until the Yushin Constitution was repealed and boldly criticized Park's dictatorship, which could be punished with imprisonment under the new constitution.

In August 1979, Kim allowed around 200 female workers at the Y.H. Trading Company to use the headquarters of New Democratic Party as a place for their sit-in demonstration and pledged to protect them. One thousand policemen raided the party headquarters and arrested the workers. One female worker died in the process and many lawmakers trying to protect them were severely beaten, some requiring hospitalization. The YH incident garnered widespread criticism and led to Kim's condemnation, with an assertion that Park's dictatorship would soon collapse. After this incident, Park was determined to remove Kim from the political scene, like the imprisoned Kim Dae-jung, and instructed the South Korean Central Intelligence Agency (KCIA) to engineer such a move. In September 1979, a court order suspended Kim's presidency of the New Democratic Party.

When Kim called on the United States to stop supporting Park's dictatorship in an interview with the New York Times, Park wanted to have Kim imprisoned while the Carter Administration, concerned over increasing human right violations, issued a strong warning not to persecute members of the opposition party. Kim was expelled from the National Assembly in October 1979, and the United States recalled its ambassador back to Washington, D.C., and all 66 lawmakers of the New Democratic Party resigned from the National Assembly.

When it became known that the South Korean government was planning to accept the resignations selectively, uprisings broke out in Kim's hometown of Busan. It was the biggest demonstration since the Syngman Rhee presidency, and spread to nearby Masan and other cities, with students and citizens calling for an end to the dictatorship. The Bu-Ma Democratic Protests caused a crisis, and amidst this chaos Park Chung Hee was assassinated on 26 October 1979 by KCIA Director Kim Jae-gyu.

=== House arrest ===
The government's oppressive stance towards the opposition continued under Chun Doo-hwan, who seized power with a military coup on 12 December 1979. Kim Young-Sam was expelled from the National Assembly for his democratic activities and banned from politics from 1980 to 1985. In May 1983, he undertook a 21-day hunger strike protesting the dictatorship of Chun Doo-hwan.

=== Failed presidential run: 1987 ===
When the first democratic presidential election was held in 1987 after Chun's retirement, Kim Young-sam and Kim Dae-jung ran against each other, splitting the opposition vote and enabling ex-general Roh Tae-woo, Chun's hand-picked successor, to win the election. This was also despite support from the first female presidential candidate, Hong Sook-ja, who resigned her candidacy in order to support Kim.

=== Merged with the ruling party: 1990–92 ===
On 22 January 1990, he merged his Democratic Reunification Party with Roh's ruling Democratic Justice Party to form the Democratic Liberal Party. Kim's decision angered many democratic activists and politicians such as future president Roh Moo-hyun, who considered him a traitor, but he maintained his political base in Busan and Gyeongsang Province. Kim chose to merge with Roh's ruling party in order to become Roh's successor in 1992, when he became the presidential nominee of the ruling Democratic Liberal Party.

== Presidency (1993–98) ==
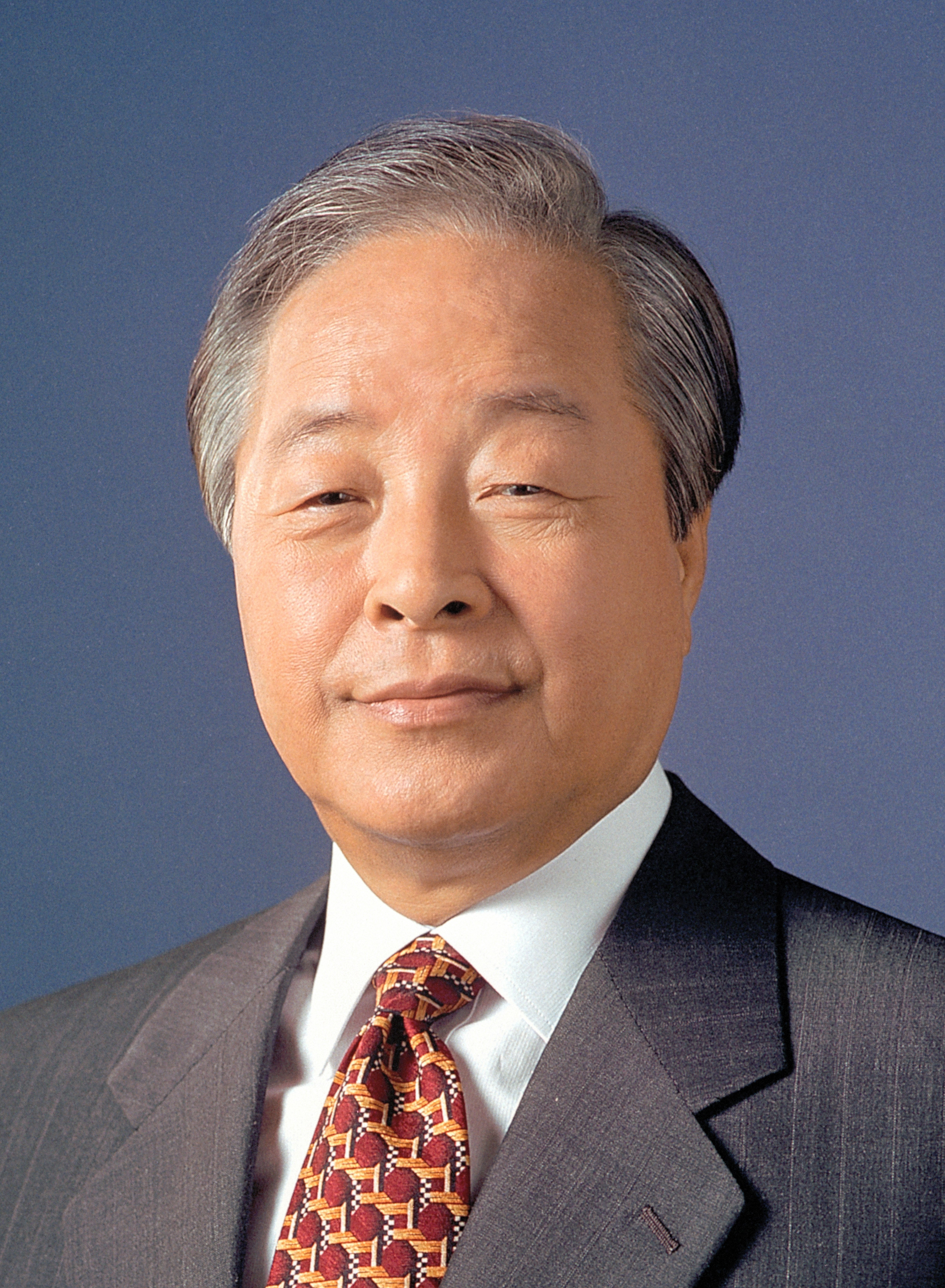
- Presidency of Kim Young-sam; 25 February 1993 – 25 February 1998
- Prime Minister: Hwang In-sung; Lee Hoi-chang; Lee Yung-dug; Lee Hong-koo; Lee Soo-sung; Goh Kun
- Cabinet: Full list
- Party: New Korea (1993–1997); Independent (1997–1998)
- Election: 1992
- Seat: Seoul

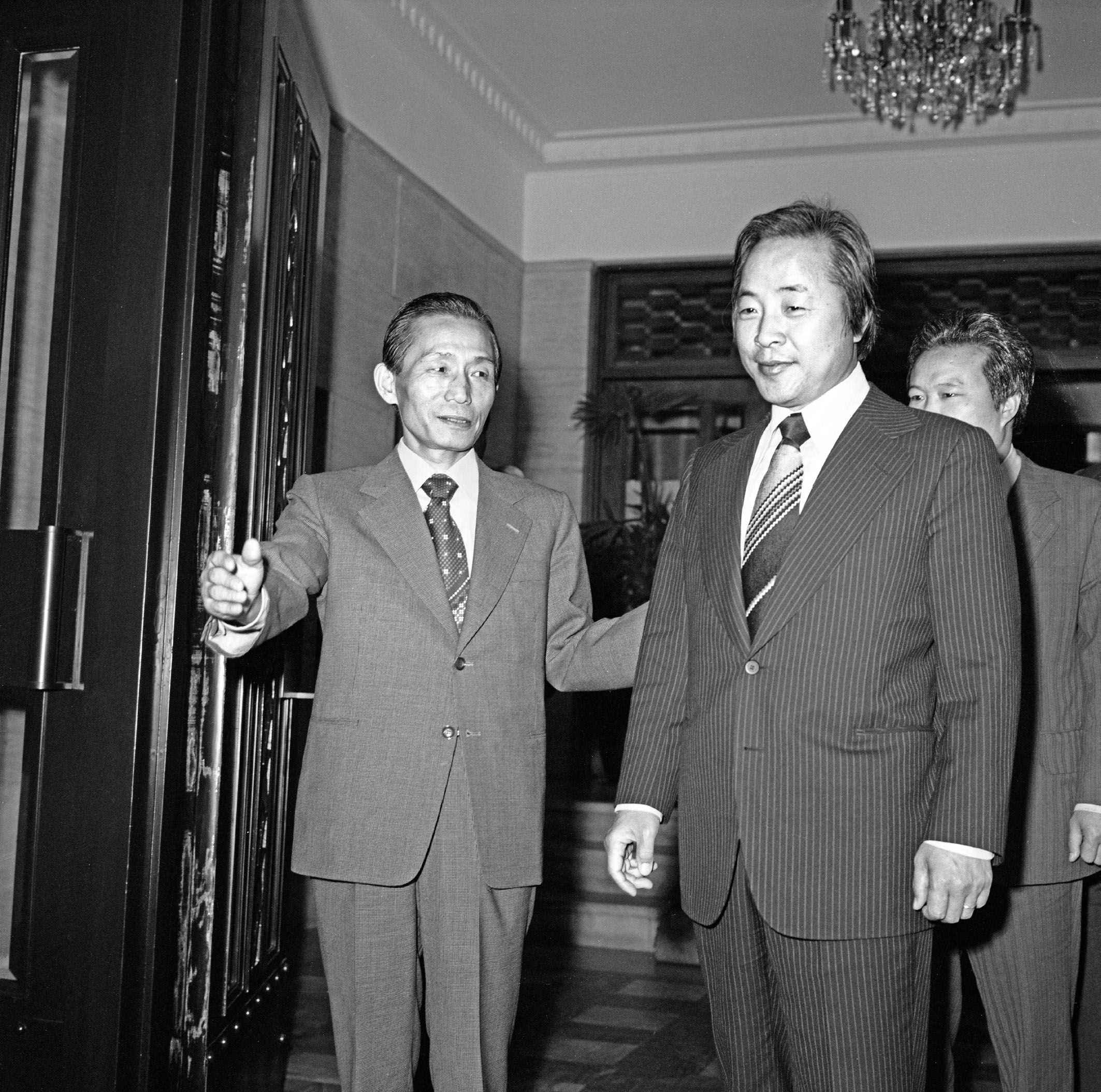
President Park Chung Hee and Kim Young-sam in May 1975

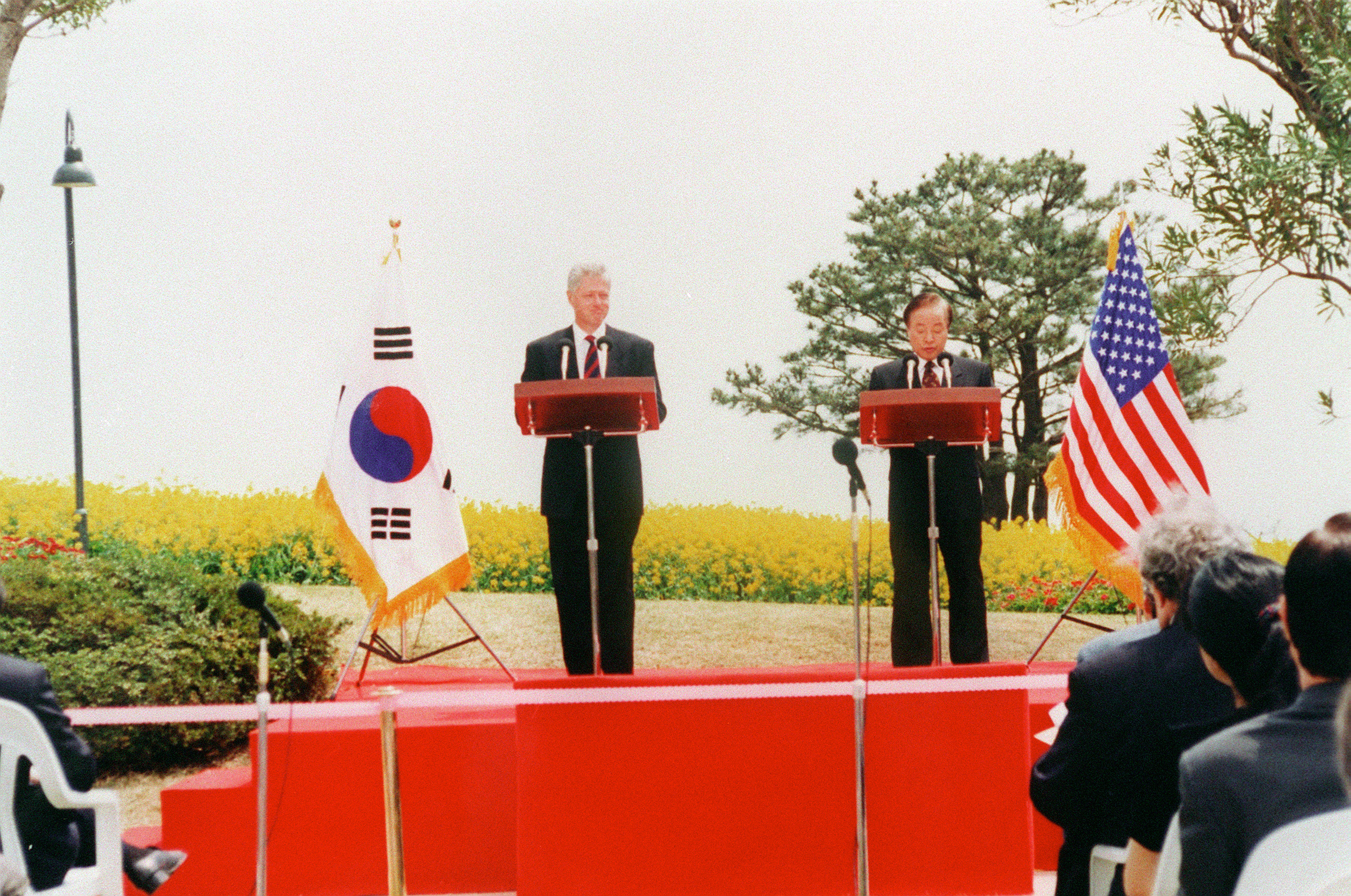
United States President Bill Clinton and Korean President Kim Young-sam at podiums in Chejudo in 1996

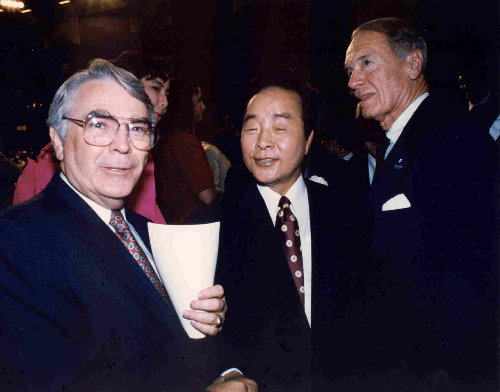
Congressman Terry Everett with South Korean President Kim Young-Sam on 26 July 1995

As the candidate of the governing party, he defeated Kim Dae-jung and businessman Chung Ju-yung, the boss of the chaebol group Hyundai in the 1992 presidential election. He was the first civilian elected to a full term since 1960.

=== Reforms ===
The Kim Young-sam administration attempted to reform the government and the economy. One of the first acts of his government was to start an anti-corruption campaign, which began at the very top, as Kim promised not to use political slush funds. The anti-corruption campaign was also part of an attempt to reform the chaebols, the large South Korean conglomerates which dominated the economy.

Kim's government required government and military officials to publish their financial records and introduced the "real-name" financial transaction system across the country, which made it difficult to open bank accounts under false names, precipitating the resignation of several high-ranking officers and cabinet members. This also made it difficult for chaebols to seek government favours by remitting money to politicians and officials under false and anonymous names, drastically curbing such practices. He arrested and indicted his two predecessors as president, Chun and Roh, on charges of corruption and treason for their role in military coups, although they would be pardoned near the end of his term on advice of president-elect Kim Dae-jung. Kim did not stop there, his administration pursued chaebol bosses who paid these bribes to Chun and Roh, most prominently Lee Kun-hee of Samsung and Kim Woo-choong of Daewoo were prosecuted, although Lee's sentence was suspended and Kim did not serve his sentence.

Kim also purged politically minded generals of the Hanahoe clique to which Chun and Roh belonged; until that point, the clique had continued to be deeply engaged in policymaking. Thus, Hanahoe was disbanded and the depoliticization of the military began under Kim.

Kim also granted amnesty to 41,000 political prisoners in March 1993 just after taking office, and removed the criminal convictions of pro-democracy protesters who had been arrested during the Gwangju massacre in the aftermath of the Coup d'état of December Twelfth.

However, Kim's anti-corruption message was damaged after his son was arrested for bribery and tax evasion related to the Hanbo scandal. Kim also admitted to accepting political donations for an apparent slush fund just as his predecessors were also arrested and jailed for creating slush funds worth hundreds of millions of dollars.

=== Economy ===
Kim was critical of the influence of chaebols on Korean society in the early 1990s, but was a firm believer in deregulation that heavily empowered "small[-] and medium-sized firms." During his administration, Kim viewed chaebols that monopolized importing certain resources or products and/or predominated certain markets they were "large enterprises" in as outdated parts of the era before his presidency and empowered by lax policies from the prior governments.

In addition to curbing corrupt practices of the chaebols, Kim encouraged them to become leaner and more competitive to succeed in the global economy, in contrast to the state-directed economic growth model of the preceding decades. Chaebols were criticized at that time for inefficiency and a lack of specialization. Kim released his "100-Day Plan for the New Economy" for immediate economic reform, intended to decrease inflation and eliminate corporate corruption. Another Five-Year Plan was also implemented, to encourage foreign investment as part of Kim's internationalization and economic liberalism strategy. By 1996, per capita GNP exceeded US$10,000.

==== 1997 IMF Crisis ====
Kim spent his final year in office, with the nation saddled and plagued by an economic crisis.

By 1996 and 1997, the banking sector was burdened with non-performing loans as its large chaebols were funding aggressive expansions. During that time, there was a haste by chaebols to compete and expand on the world stage, and Kim's 1993 financial reforms which allowed for the growth of merchant banks and short term loans fuelled increased borrowing by these companies. Many businesses ultimately failed to ensure returns and profitability. The chaebols continued to absorb more and more capital investment. Eventually, excess debt led to major failures and takeovers. The Hanbo scandal which involved Kim's son in early 1997 exposed South Korea's economic weaknesses and corruption problems to the international financial community. Hanbo was the first to declare bankruptcy in January 1997, sparking a domino effect. Kim's government was seen as indecisive in the face of crisis as the financial tsunami began. The next big chaebol to go, was in July 1997 when South Korea's third-largest car maker, Kia Motors, asked for emergency loans. The Kim government refused to bail them out on Kia's terms, and nationalized it in October 1997. The domino effect of collapsing large South Korean companies drove interest rates up and international investors away.

In the wake of the Asian market downturn, Moody's lowered the credit rating of South Korea from A1 to A3, on 28 November 1997, and downgraded again to B2 on 11 December. That contributed to a further decline in South Korean shares since stock markets were already bearish in November. The Seoul stock exchange fell by 4% on 7 November 1997. On 8 November, it plunged by 7%, its biggest one-day drop to that date. And on 24 November, stocks fell a further 7.2% on fears that the IMF would demand tough reforms. Other prominent chaebols were affected: Samsung Motors' $5 billion venture was dissolved due to the crisis, and eventually Daewoo Motors was sold to the American company General Motors (GM).

On 22 November 1997, Kim in a televised address to the nation, apologised and called for the nation to tighten its belts. He blamed companies for borrowing too much, workers for demanding too much pay and conceded that his government did not implement strong reforms on its own due to pressure from special interest groups. As a result, Kim became the most unpopular president in history with an approval rating of 6%, until Park Geun-hye broke this record with a 5% rating in 2016 before her impeachment. This is until she reached a record low of 1 to 3%.

On 3 December 1997, the International Monetary Fund (IMF) agreed to provide US$58.4 billion as a bailout package. In return, Korea was required to take restructuring measures. In addition, the Korean government started financial sector reform program. Under the program, 787 insolvent financial institutions were closed or merged by June 2003.

The South Korean won, meanwhile, weakened to more than 1,700 per U.S. dollar from around 800, but later managed to recover. However, like the chaebol, South Korea's government under Kim did not escape unscathed. Its national debt-to-GDP ratio more than doubled (approximately 13% to 30%) as a result of the crisis.

=== North Korea ===
In 1994, when American president Bill Clinton considered attacking Nyongbyon, the centre of North Korea's nuclear program, Kim advised him to back down, fearing a war. A US aircraft carrier and a cruiser had been deployed near South Korea's east coast in preparation for a possible airstrike and the United States planned to evacuate Americans, including US troops and their families, Kim said in a memoir. He understood that South Korean cities would be bombarded first by North Korea in the event of a strike and thought it necessary to stop any move that could start a war.

=== Japan ===
Kim took an upfront and straightforward attitude in his diplomacy toward Japan, with his quote "We will teach them to have manners once and for all," referring to Japanese politicians who defended Japan's wartime atrocities from annexation to the end of World War II.

Kim's government also undersaw the highly publicized demolition of the colonial-era General Government Building in 1996.

== Later life and post-presidency (1998–2015) ==
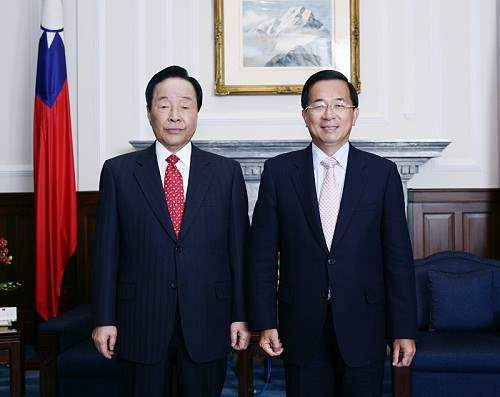
Kim (left) with President of Taiwan Chen Shui-bian (2008)

Kim could not run for re-election in 1997, as the constitution limits the president to a single five-year term. His term ended on 24 February 1998, and he was succeeded by his political rival Kim Dae-jung who defeated the ruling conservative party in the 1997 South Korean presidential election. This marked the first peaceful transition of power to an opposition party in South Korea's history.

From April 2002 to 2007, he dedicated himself to research, taking up a position as a Distinguished Professor at Waseda University where he had previously (1994) received an honorary Doctor of Laws degree.

After his presidency, Kim traveled the world promoting democracy, and speaking at events such as Towards a Global Forum on New Democracies in Taiwan in January 2007. After retiring, President Kim Young-sam spent his later years at his private residence in Sangdo-dong.

== Death ==
Kim died in Seoul National University Hospital on 22 November 2015, from heart failure at the age of 87. He was survived by his children, two sons and three daughters, as well as his five younger sisters.

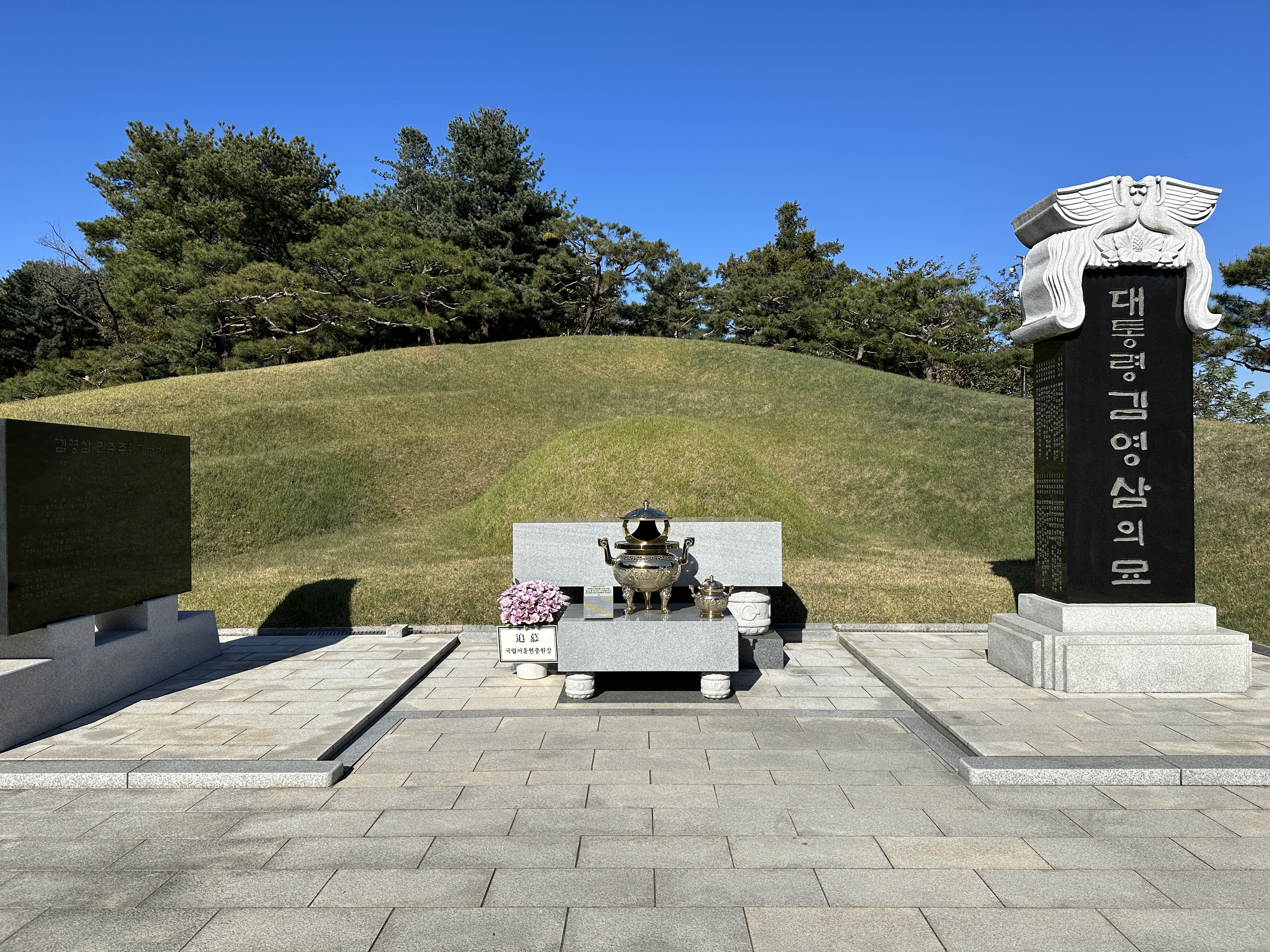
Kim's grave in the Seoul National Cemetery (2023)

On 26 November 2015, a televised state funeral was held for Kim at the National Assembly lawn, It was attended by Former National Assembly Speaker Kim Soo-han, former President Lee Myung-bak, First Ladies Kim Yoon-ok, Kwon Yang-sook, and members of National Assembly. However, President Park Geun-hye, former Presidents Chun Doo-hwan and Roh Tae-woo were absent. during which Prime Minister Hwang Kyo-ahn delivered the opening remarks. Later that day, Kim was buried in the Seoul National Cemetery near former presidents Syngman Rhee, Park Chung Hee and Kim Dae-jung.

== Legacy ==
In the aftermath of the 1997 IMF crisis, Kim suffered from low approval ratings for many years. However, following his death, public interest in his achievements during the democratization movement as well as his presidency grew, and he began to be reevaluated in the media. In a contemporary public survey of past presidents from Gallup Korea, the percentage of those responding that Kim "did many good things" jumped from 16% in 2015 to 40% in 2023, and those saying that he "did many wrong things" fell from 42% to 30% over the same time period. This narrowly placed him among the few past presidents whose positive ratings exceeded negative ratings (the others being Park Chung Hee, Kim Dae-jung, and Roh Moo-hyun). Kim also differed from the more ideologically polarized ratings of other presidents by showing a remarkably similar evaluation between supporters of the two major parties, as well as between self-described conservatives, moderates, and progressives.

Similarly, in contrast to the years following his presidency, when Kim was seen as something of an embarrassment for many on the right, he is now seen as a figure that expands the democratic credentials of the mainstream conservative parties. In November 2017, then-Liberty Korea Party leader Hong Joon-pyo hung a portrait of Kim in the party headquarters alongside the two traditional conservative icons of Syngman Rhee and Park Chung Hee, and the portraits have been inherited by the People Power Party in 2023.

== Personal life ==
Kim was a member of the Chunghyun Presbyterian Church and was fluent in Japanese in addition to his native language, Korean. He was married to Son Myung-soon. He had six children: Kim Hye-young (daughter, born 1952), Kim Hye-jeong (daughter, born 1954), Kim Eun-chul (son, born 1956), Kim Hyun-chul (son, born 1959), Kim Sang-man (extramarital son, born 1959), and Kim Hye-sook (daughter, born 1961).

When he was in office, his public speeches were the subject of much scrutiny and his pronunciation of Gyeongsang dialect elicited both criticism and amusement. He once mistakenly pronounced '경제 (Gyeongje, 經濟: meaning 'economy')' as '갱제 (Gaengje: a Gyeongsang pronunciation of the older generation for '경제')' and '외무부 장관 (oemubu-janggwan, 外務部長官: meaning 'foreign minister')' as '애무부 장관 (aemubu-janggwan, 愛撫部長官: meaning 'making out minister')'. A humorous anecdote arose from another of his public speeches where audiences were said to have been surprised to hear that he would make Jeju a world-class 'rape' (관광, 觀光 [gwan gwang, tourism] > 강간, 強姦 [gang-gan, rape]) city by building up an 'adultery' (관통하는, 貫通- [gwantonghaneun, going-through]) > 간통하는, 姦通- [gantonghaneun, adulterous]) motorway.

== Electoral record ==
Year	Elections	Constituency	Political party	No. of votes	%	Results
1954	3rd National Assembly General Election	Tongyeong County B (South Gyeongsang)	Liberal Party	20,770	44.77%	Won
1958	4th National Assembly General Election	Busan City Seo District A (South Gyeongsang)	Democratic Party	18,858	42.98%	Defeated (2nd)
1960	5th National Assembly General Election	Busan City Seo District A (South Gyeongsang)	Democratic Party	29,754	66.87%	Won
1963	6th National Assembly General Election	Seo District (Busan)	Civil Rule Party	39,797	41.65%	Won
1967	7th National Assembly General Election	Seo District (Busan)	New Democratic Party	61,957	59.23%	Won
1971	8th National Assembly General Election	Seo District (Busan)	New Democratic Party	74,589	63.17%	Won
1973	9th National Assembly General Election	Seo District–Dong District (Busan)	New Democratic Party	83,661	40.39%	Won
1978	10th National Assembly General Election	Seo District–Dong District (Busan)	New Democratic Party	137,826	53.77%	Won
1987	1987 Presidential Election	South Korea	Reunification Democratic Party	6,337,581	28.03%	Defeated (2nd)
1988	13th National Assembly General Election	Seo District (Busan)	Reunification Democratic Party	72,599	66.49%	Won
1992	14th National Assembly General Election	National (1st)	Democratic Liberal Party	7,923,718	38.49%	Elected
1992	1992 Presidential Election	South Korea	Democratic Liberal Party	9,977,332	41.96%	Won

== Awards ==
=== National honours ===
- South Korea:
  - Recipient of the Grand Order of Mugunghwa'
  - First Class of the Order of Merit for National Foundation
  - First Class of the Order of Civil Merit
  - First Class of the Order of Military Merit
  - First Class of the Order of National Security Merit
  - Grand Gwanghwa Medal of the Order of Diplomatic Service Merit

=== Foreign honours ===
- Malaysia:
  - Honorary Recipient of the Order of the Crown of the Realm
- Peru:
  - Grand Cross of the Order of the Sun of Peru
- Philippines:
  - Grand Collar of the Order of Sikatuna
- Poland:
  - Grand Cross of the Order of Merit of the Republic of Poland
- South Africa:
  - Grand Cross of the Order of Good Hope
- Spain:
  - Collar of the Order of Civil Merit
- Ukraine:
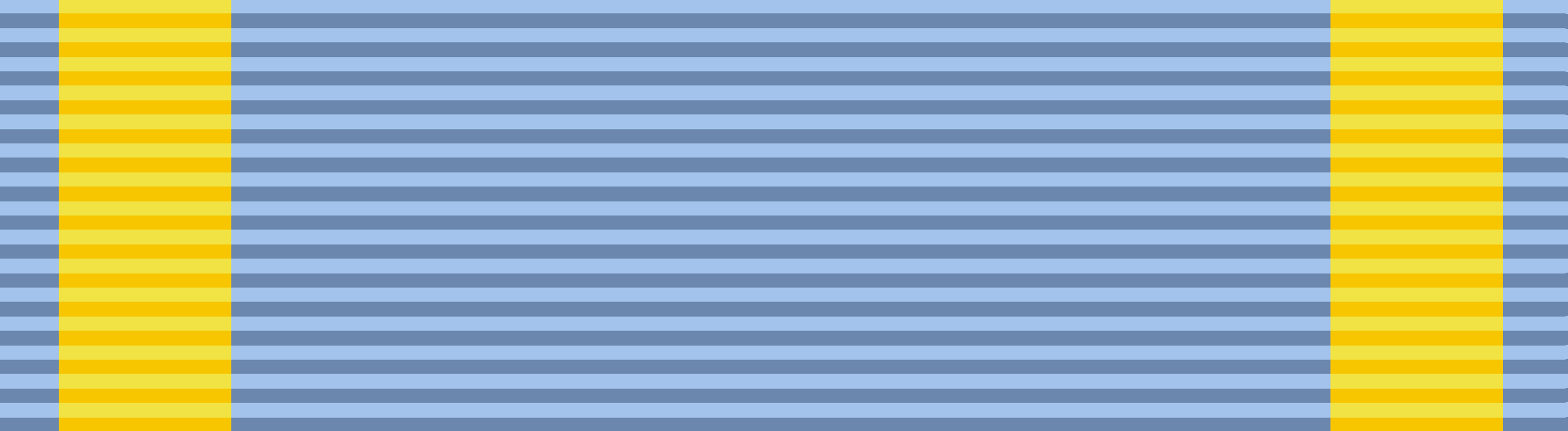
  - Second Class of the Order of Prince Yaroslav the Wise

Political offices
Preceded by Roh Tae-woo	President of South Korea; 25 February 1993–24 February 1998	Succeeded by Kim Dae-jung
National Assembly of the Republic of Korea
Preceded by Lee Chae-oh	Member of the National Assembly from Tongyeong County B (South Gyeongsang); 31 May 1954–30 May 1958	Succeeded by Jin Suk-jung (Tongyeong County, South Gyeongsang)
Preceded by Lee Sang-ryong	Member of the National Assembly from Busan City Seo District A (South Gyeongsang); 29 July 1960–16 May 1961	Succeeded by Himself (Seo, Busan)
Preceded by Himself (Busan City, Seo District A, South Gyeongsang); Kim Dong-wook (Busan City, Seo District B, South Gyeongsang)	Member of the National Assembly from Seo District (Busan); 17 December 1963–17 October 1972	Succeeded by Himself, Park Chan-jong (Seo District–Dong District, Busan)
Preceded by Himself (Seo District, Busan); Kim Seung-mok (Dong District, Busan)	Member of the National Assembly from Seo District–Dong District (Busan); 12 March 1973–4 October 1979	Succeeded by Wang Sang-eun, Ahn Geun-il (Jung District–Dong District–Yeongdo District, Busan); Kwak Jeong-chul, Seo Seok-jae (Seo District, Busan)
Preceded by Kwak Jeong-chul, Seo Seok-jae (Seo District–Saha District, Busan)	Member of the National Assembly from Seo District (Busan); 30 May 1988–29 May 1992	Succeeded by Kwak Jeong-chul
Preceded by	Member of the National Assembly from National (1st, Democratic Liberal Party); 30 May 1992–13 October 1992	Succeeded by
Party political offices
Preceded by Yu Chin-san; Kim Eui-taek (acting)	President of New Democratic Party; 22 August 1974–25 May 1976	Succeeded by Lee Chung-hwan (acting); Yi Cheol-seung (Chairman of New Democratic Party)
Preceded by Yi Cheol-seung (Chairman of New Democratic Party); Chung Woon-gap (acting)	President of New Democratic Party; 30 May 1979–8 September 1979; 12 December 1979–13 August 1980	Succeeded by Chung Woon-gap (acting); Lee Min-woo (acting); Office abolished
Preceded by New Office; Kim Myeong-yun (acting); Kim Young-Sam (himself)	President of Reunification Democratic Party; 1 May 1987–8 February 1988; 12 May 1988–22 January 1990	Succeeded by Kim Myeong-yun (acting); Kim Young-Sam (himself); Office abolished
Preceded by New Office	Chairman of Democratic Liberal Party; 9 May 1990–28 August 1992	Succeeded by Kim Jong-pil
Preceded by Roh Tae-woo	President of Democratic Liberal Party, New Korea Party; 28 August 1992–30 September 1997	Succeeded by Lee Hoi-chang
Preceded by Roh Tae-woo (Honor President of Democratic Liberal Party)	Honor President of New Korea Party; 30 September 1997–14 November 1997	Succeeded by Lee Hoi-chang (Honor President of Grand National Party)
Preceded by Yu Chi-song (Democratic Korea Party nominee President South Korea)	Reunification Democratic Party nominee for President of South Korea; 1987	Succeeded by Office abolished
Preceded by Roh Tae-woo	Democratic Liberal Party nominee for President of South Korea; 1992	Succeeded by Lee Hoi-chang
