= Hanbo scandal =

1990s corruption scandal involving Hanbo Steel

The Hanbo scandal (also known as Hanbogate) refers to the late-1990s events involving corruption by senior South Korean government officials and top executives of the Hanbo Steel (한보그룹) conglomerate, then South Korea's second biggest steelmaker and 14th biggest conglomerate based on the book value of their assets. The resulting scandal in the first half of 1997 has been described as one of the largest in South Korean history.

== Events ==
Hanbo Corp. went into receivership on 28 January 1997. It was the 14th largest Korean chaebol (family-owned business conglomerate) in 1995, up from 28th in 1994. Hanbo was initially a small steelmaker that began building a huge plant in 1992, funded with high interest rate loans. The failure of Hanbo took place at a time when the authorities, influenced by the ideas of some reformers who opposed the concentration of economic power in chaebol, began to allow large corporate bankruptcies.

Following a trial, in June 1997 the court said Hanbo Steel received illegal preferential treatment from the government of Korean president Kim Young-sam, primarily through loans issued by banks under pressure from bribed high-ranking politicians and bankers. Losses were estimated at US$6 billion. Hanbo's founder, Chung Tae Soo, was sentenced to 15 years in jail for giving bribes, embezzlement and fraud. Chung had previously been convicted of bribing officials: in 1991 to rezone a greenbelt around Seoul to permit a Hanbo Construction apartment complex, and in 1996 for giving $16 million to then-President Roh Tae Woo's slush fund.

The son of Hanbo Chairman Chung Tae Soo, Chung Bo Keun, was given a three year sentence. Eight other prominent figures, including former Home Minister Kim Woo Suk, several presidential aides and parliament members, and two former presidents of Korea First Bank were also handed sentences. The son of the president, Kim Hyun-chul, was arrested in a related investigation and sentenced to three years in October 1997. Hong In Gil of the then ruling New Korea Party received a seven-year prison sentence. Kwon Roh Kap, a member of the main opposition National Congress for New Politics, was sentenced to five years in prison.

== Impact ==
The scandal is seen as contributing to the Korean economic troubles of that time (see also 1997 Asian financial crisis), and exposing South Korea's economic weaknesses and corruption problems to the international financial community. Hanbo was one of the first in a series of at least ten large South Korean conglomerate bankruptcies that occurred during this period (involving major companies like Kia Motors and Daewoo; the latter also part of a major corruption scandal). The domino effect of collapsing large South Korean companies drove up interest rates and drove away international investors.

In February 1997, Moody's Investors Service downgraded the long-term ratings of three Korean banks having the most exposure to Hanbo Steel: Korea Exchange Bank, Korea First Bank, and Cho Hung Bank.

In domestic Korean politics, the involvement of the son of Kim Young-sam in the scandal undermined his father's reforms and anti-corruption campaign.
