= Minister of Justice (South Korea) =

South Korean government position

- Incumbent; Vacant since 25 August 2026
- Ministry of Justice
- Member of: State Council of South Korea
- Reports to: President of South Korea
- Appointer: President
- Formation: August 2, 1948; 78 years ago
- Deputy: Deputy Minister of Justice

Korean name
- Hangul: 법무부 장관
- Hanja: 法務部長官
- RR: Beommubu janggwan
- MR: Pŏmmubu changgwan

The Minister of Justice (Korean: 법무부장관) of South Korea is the leader and chief executive of the Ministry of Justice. The minister is the chief administrator of South Korea's prosecution service and oversees various judicial functions such as immigration, penal correction, and human rights. On ongoing individual criminal cases, the minister may instruct the Prosecutor General, but may not interfere with lower-ranking prosecutors.

The minister is a member of the State Council. The Minister of Justice is appointed by the president and is confirmed upon a hearing by the National Assembly.

The position of the Minister of Justice has been left vacant since the resignation of Jeong Seong-ho in August 2026. Vice minister of justice Lee Jin-su is expected to serve the position as deputy until a new minister is appointed.

== List of ministers ==
Denotes acting minister

No.	Portrait	Name	Term of office			President
No.	Portrait	Name	Took office	Left office	Time in office	President
1		Lee In 이인 李仁	2 August 1948	5 June 1949	307 days	Syngman Rhee
2		Gwon Seung-ryeol 권승렬 權承烈	6 June 1949	21 May 1950	349 days	Syngman Rhee
3		Lee Woo-ik 이우익 李愚益	22 May 1950	22 November 1950	184 days	Syngman Rhee
4		Kim Chun-yon 김준연 金俊淵	23 November 1950	6 May 1951	164 days	Syngman Rhee
5		Cho Chin-man 조진만 趙鎭滿	7 May 1951	4 March 1952	302 days	Syngman Rhee
6		Seo Sang-hwan 서상환 徐相歡	5 March 1952	29 June 1954	2 years, 116 days	Syngman Rhee
7		Jo Yong-soon 조용순 趙容淳	30 June 1954	15 September 1955	1 year, 77 days	Syngman Rhee
8		Lee Ho 이호 李澔	16 September 1955	19 February 1958	2 years, 156 days	Syngman Rhee
9		Hong Jin-ki 홍진기 洪璡基	20 February 1958	23 March 1960	2 years, 32 days	Syngman Rhee
10		Gwon Seung-ryeol 권승렬 權承烈	25 April 1960	19 August 1960	116 days	Ho Chong (acting)
11		Jo Jae-chun 조재천 曺在千	23 August 1960	2 May 1961	252 days	Yun Posun
12		Lee Byoung-ha 이병하 李炳夏	3 May 1961	18 May 1961	15 days	Yun Posun
13		Goh Won-jeung 고원증 高元增	20 May 1961	8 January 1962	234 days	Yun Posun
14		Jo Byoung-il 조병일 趙炳日	9 January 1962	31 January 1963	1 year, 22 days	Park Chung-hee (acting)
15		Jang Young-soon 장영순 張榮淳	1 February 1963	21 April 1963	79 days	Park Chung-hee (acting)
16		Min Bok-ki (Note: Min Bok-ki was re-appointed as justice minister two times following his initial appointment in April 1963 in accordance with the commencing of the Choi Tu-son and Chung Il-kwon cabinets in December 1963 and May 1964, respectively. Although he is counted to have served three consecutive terms, Min is nonetheless considered to have served the longest continous term as justice minister.) 민복기 閔復基	22 April 1963	11 December 1963	3 years, 156 days	Park Chung-hee (acting)
17		Min Bok-ki 민복기 閔復基	12 December 1963	10 May 1964	3 years, 156 days	Park Chung-hee
18		Min Bok-ki 민복기 閔復基	11 May 1964	25 September 1966	3 years, 156 days	Park Chung-hee
19		Kwon Oh-byoung 권오병 權五柄	26 September 1966	20 May 1968	1 year, 237 days	Park Chung-hee
20		Lee Ho 이호 李澔	21 May 1968	20 December 1970	2 years, 213 days	Park Chung-hee
21		Bae Young-ho 배영호 裵泳鎬	21 December 1970	3 June 1971	164 days	Park Chung-hee
22		Shin Jik-soo 신직수 申稙秀	4 June 1971	2 December 1973	2 years, 181 days	Park Chung-hee
23		Lee Bong-sung 이봉성 李鳳成	3 December 1973	17 September 1974	288 days	Park Chung-hee
24		Hwang San-duk (Note: Hwang served two consecutive terms as Minister of Justice, being renominated as Justice minister in December 1975 following the launching of the Choi Kyu-hah cabinet.) 황산덕 黃山德	18 September 1974	18 December 1975	2 years, 76 days	Park Chung-hee
25		Hwang San-duk 황산덕 黃山德	19 December 1975	3 December 1976	2 years, 76 days	Park Chung-hee
26		Lee Sun-joong 이선중 李善中	4 December 1976	21 December 1978	2 years, 17 days	Park Chung-hee
27		Kim Chi-yeol 김치열 金致烈	22 December 1978	13 December 1979	356 days	Park Chung-hee
28		Baek Sang-ki 백상기 白翔起	14 December 1979	21 May 1980	159 days	Choi Kyu-hah
29		Oh Tak-keun (Note: Oh was renominated justice minister by Chun Doo-hwan in September 1980.) 오탁근 吳鐸根	22 May 1980	1 September 1980	322 days	Chun Doo-hwan
30		Oh Tak-keun 오탁근 吳鐸根	2 September 1980	9 April 1981	322 days	Chun Doo-hwan
31		Lee Jong-won 이종원 李鐘元	10 April 1981	20 May 1982	1 year, 40 days	Chun Doo-hwan
32		Jeong Chi-geun 정치근 鄭致根	21 May 1982	23 June 1982	33 days	Chun Doo-hwan
33		Bae Myoung-in 배명인 裵命仁	24 June 1982	18 February 1985	2 years, 239 days	Chun Doo-hwan
34		Kim Seok-hui 김석휘 金錫輝	19 February 1985	15 July 1985	146 days	Chun Doo-hwan
35		Kim Sung-ki 김성기 金聖基	16 July 1985	25 May 1987	1 year, 313 days	Chun Doo-hwan
36		Jung Hae-chang (Note: Jung was renominated as justice minister with the launching of the Roh Tae-woo presidency in February 1988.) 정해창 丁海昌	26 May 1987	24 February 1988		Chun Doo-hwan
37		Jung Hae-chang 정해창 丁海昌	25 February 1988	4 December 1988		Roh Tae-woo
38		Huh Hyoung-ku 허형구 許亨九	5 December 1988	18 March 1990	1 year, 103 days	Roh Tae-woo
39		Lee Jong-nam 이종남 李種南	19 March 1990	26 May 1991	1 year, 68 days	Roh Tae-woo
40		Kim Ki-chun 김기춘 金淇春	27 May 1991	8 October 1992	1 year, 134 days	Roh Tae-woo
41		Lee Jung-woo 이정우 李正雨	9 October 1992	25 February 1993	139 days	Roh Tae-woo
42		Park Hee-tae 박희태 朴熺太	26 February 1993	7 March 1993	9 days	Kim Young-sam
43		Kim Doo-Hee 김두희 金斗喜	8 March 1993	23 December 1994	1 year, 290 days	Kim Young-sam
44		An Woo-man 안우만 安又萬	24 December 1994	5 March 1997	2 years, 71 days	Kim Young-sam
45		Choi Sang-yeop 최상엽 崔相曄	6 March 1997	4 August 1997	151 days	Kim Young-sam
46		Kim Jong-gu 김종구 金鍾求	5 August 1997	2 March 1998	209 days	Kim Young-sam
47		Park Sang-chun 박상천 朴相千	3 March 1998	23 May 1999	1 year, 81 days	Kim Dae-jung
48		Kim Tae-jung 김태정 金泰政	24 May 1999	7 June 1999	14 days	Kim Dae-jung
49		Kim Jung-kil 김정길 金正吉	8 June 1999	20 May 2001	1 year, 346 days	Kim Dae-jung
50		An Dong-soo 안동수 安東洙	21 May 2001	23 May 2001	2 days	Kim Dae-jung
51		Choi Kyoung-won 최경원 崔慶元	24 May 2001	28 January 2002	249 days	Kim Dae-jung
52		Song Jeong-ho 송정호 宋正鎬	29 January 2002	10 July 2002	162 days	Kim Dae-jung
53		Kim Jung-kil 김정길 金正吉	11 July 2002	5 November 2002	117 days	Kim Dae-jung
54		Sim Sang-myoung 심상명 沈相明	9 November 2002	26 February 2003	109 days	Kim Dae-jung
55		Kang Kum-sil 강금실 康錦實	27 February 2003	29 July 2004	1 year, 153 days	Roh Moo-hyun
56		Kim Seung-kew 김승규 金昇圭	29 July 2004	29 June 2005	335 days	Roh Moo-hyun
57		Chun Jung-bae 천정배 千正培	29 June 2005	26 July 2006	1 year, 27 days	Roh Moo-hyun
58		Kim Sung-ho 김성호 金成浩	30 August 2006	3 September 2007	1 year, 4 days	Roh Moo-hyun
59		Chung Soung-jin 정성진 鄭城鎭	4 September 2007	29 February 2008	178 days	Roh Moo-hyun
60		Kim Kyung-han 김경한 金慶漢	29 February 2008	29 September 2009	1 year, 213 days	Lee Myung-bak
61		Lee Kwi-nam 이귀남 李貴男	30 September 2009	10 August 2011	1 year, 314 days	Lee Myung-bak
62		Kwon Jae-jin 권재진 權在珍	11 August 2011	10 March 2013	1 year, 211 days	Lee Myung-bak
63		Hwang Kyo-ahn 황교안 黃敎安	11 March 2013	13 June 2015	2 years, 94 days	Park Geun-hye
64		Kim Hyun-woong 김현웅 金賢雄	9 June 2015	29 November 2016	1 year, 173 days	Park Geun-hye
65		Park Sang-ki 박상기 朴相基	19 July 2017	8 September 2019	2 years, 51 days	Moon Jae-in
66		Cho Kuk 조국 曺國	9 September 2019	14 October 2019	35 days	Moon Jae-in
—		Kim Oh-soo (acting) 김오수 金浯洙	14 October 2019	1 January 2020	79 days	Moon Jae-in
67		Choo Mi-ae 추미애 秋美愛	2 January 2020	27 January 2021	1 year, 25 days	Moon Jae-in
68		Park Beom-kye 박범계 朴範界	28 January 2021	9 May 2022	1 year, 101 days	Moon Jae-in
69		Han Dong-hoon 한동훈 韓東勳	17 May 2022	21 December 2023	1 year, 218 days	Yoon Suk Yeol
70		Park Sung-jae 박성재 朴性載	20 February 2024	4 June 2025	1 year, 104 days	Yoon Suk Yeol
71		Jeong Seong-ho 정성호 鄭成湖	19 July 2025	24 August 2026	1 year, 36 days	Lee Jae Myung
