= Cabinet of Rhee Syng-man =

Government of South Korea from 1948 to 1960

- 1st Cabinet of South Korea

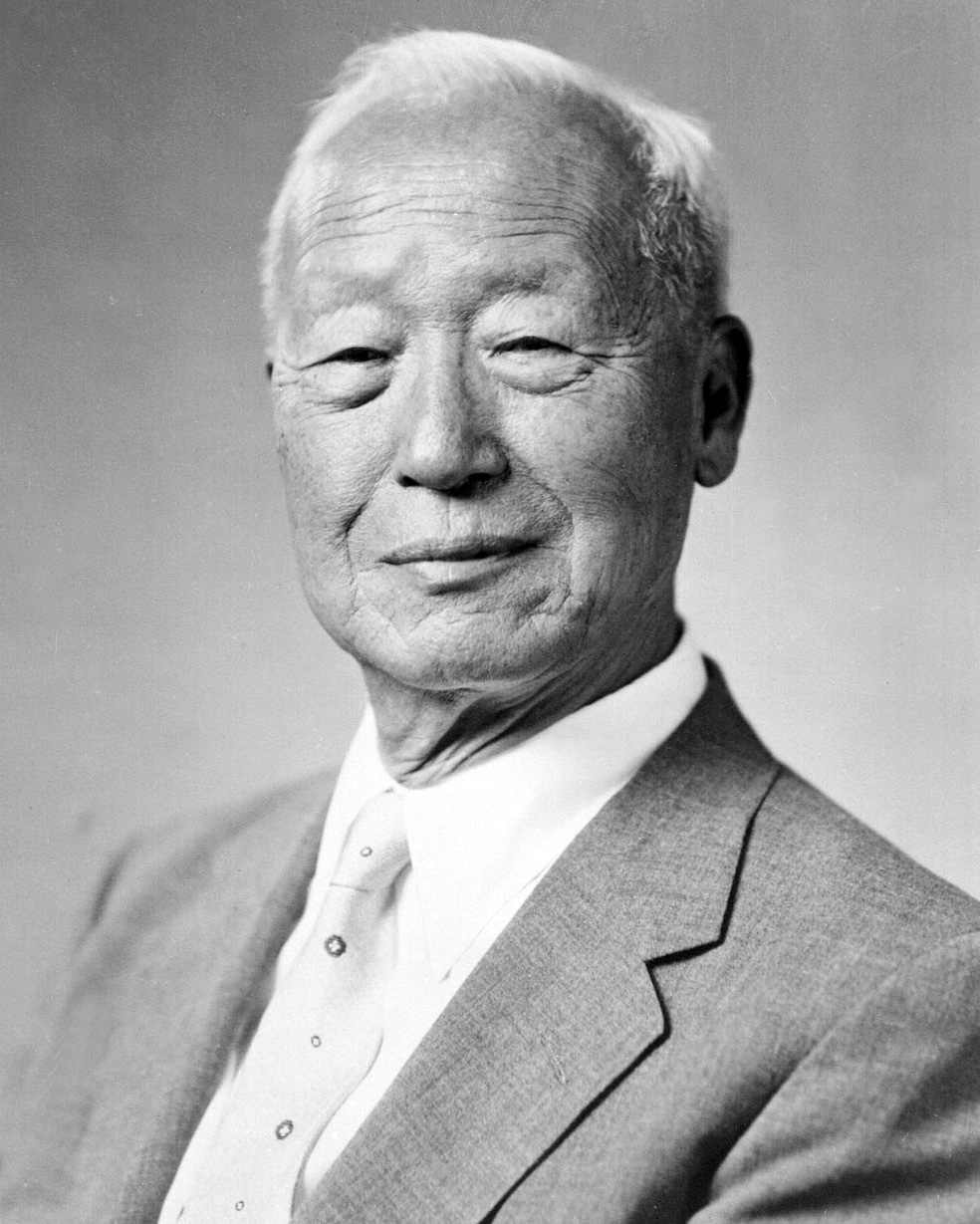
- Date formed: July 24, 1948
- Date dissolved: April 27, 1960

People and organisations
- President: Rhee Syng-man
- Member party: Liberal Party

History
- Successor: Cabinet of Ho Chong

The Cabinet of Rhee Syng-man was the first cabinet of South Korea from July 24, 1948, to April 27, 1960.

== Cabinet ==
List of cabinet members
| Portfolio | Minister | Term start | Term end |
|---|---|---|---|
| President | Rhee Syng-man | July 24, 1948 | April 27, 1960 |
| Prime Minister | Lee Beom-seok | July 31, 1948 | April 20, 1950 |
| Prime Minister | Shin Song-mo (acting) | April 21, 1950 | November 22, 1950 |
| Prime Minister | Chang Myon | November 23, 1950 | April 23, 1952 |
| Prime Minister | Yi Yun-yong (acting) | April 24, 1952 | May 5, 1952 |
| Prime Minister | Chang Taek-sang | May 6, 1952 | October 5, 1952 |
| Prime Minister | Paik Too-chin | October 9, 1952 | June 17, 1954 |
| Prime Minister | Pyon Yong-tae | June 27, 1954 | November 28, 1954 |
| Minister of Agriculture | Cho Bong-am | August 15, 1948 | February 22, 1949 |
| Minister of Agriculture | Lee Jong-hyeon | February 23, 1949 | January 20, 1950 |
| Minister of Agriculture | Yun Young-sun | January 21, 1950 | November 22, 1950 |
| Minister of Agriculture | Gong Jin-hang | November 23, 1950 | May 6, 1951 |
| Minister of Agriculture | Im Moon-hwan | May 7, 1951 | March 5, 1952 |
| Minister of Agriculture | Ham In-seop | March 6, 1952 | August 28, 1952 |
| Minister of Agriculture | Shin Jung-mok | August 29, 1952 | September 9, 1953 |
| Minister of Agriculture | Jeong Jae-seol | September 10, 1953 | October 6, 1953 |
| Minister of Agriculture | Yang Seong-bong | October 7, 1953 | May 5, 1954 |
| Minister of Agriculture | Yoon Geon-joong | May 6, 1954 | June 29, 1954 |
| Minister of Agriculture | Choi Kyu-ok | June 30, 1954 | February 15, 1955 |
| Minister of Agriculture | Lim Cheol-ho | February 16, 1955 | August 29, 1955 |
| Minister of Agriculture | Jeong Nak-hoon | August 30, 1955 | November 16, 1955 |
| Minister of Agriculture | Jeong Un-gap | November 17, 1955 | June 16, 1957 |
| Minister of Agriculture | Jeong Jae-seol | June 17, 1957 | March 20, 1959 |
| Minister of Agriculture | Lee Geun-jik | March 21, 1959 | May 1, 1960 |
| Minister of Commerce | Im Yeong-sin | August 4, 1948 | June 6, 1949 |
| Minister of Commerce | Yun Po-sun | June 6, 1949 | May 9, 1950 |
| Minister of Commerce | Kim Hoon | May 9, 1950 | March 27, 1952 |
| Minister of Commerce | Lee Kyo-seon | March 27, 1952 | November 6, 1952 |
| Minister of Commerce | Lee Jae-hyung | November 6, 1952 | October 7, 1953 |
| Minister of Commerce | Ahn Dong-hyeok | October 7, 1953 | June 30, 1954 |
| Minister of Commerce | Park Hee-hyun | June 30, 1954 | July 5, 1954 |
| Minister of Commerce | Kang Sung-tae | July 5, 1954 | September 16, 1955 |
| Minister of Commerce | Kim Il-hwan | September 16, 1955 | August 27, 1958 |
| Minister of Commerce | Gu Yong-seo | August 27, 1958 | April 8, 1960 |
| Minister of Commerce | Kim Young-chan | April 8, 1960 | April 28, 1960 |
| Minister of Education | An Ho-sang | August 15, 1948 | May 3, 1950 |
| Minister of Education | Baek Nak-jun | May 4, 1950 | October 29, 1952 |
| Minister of Education | Kim Beop-rin | October 30, 1952 | April 20, 1954 |
| Minister of Education | Lee Seon-geun | April 21, 1954 | June 7, 1956 |
| Minister of Education | Choi Kyu-nam | June 8, 1956 | November 26, 1957 |
| Minister of Education | Choi Jae-yu | November 27, 1957 | April 27, 1960 |
| Minister of Finance | Kim Do-yeon | August 2, 1948 | April 22, 1950 |
| Minister of Finance | Choi Sun-ju | April 25, 1950 | March 5, 1951 |
| Minister of Finance | Paik Too-chin | March 5, 1951 | September 9, 1953 |
| Minister of Finance | Park Hui-hyeon | September 9, 1953 | June 30, 1954 |
| Minister of Finance | Lee Jung-jyae | June 30, 1954 | July 11, 1955 |
| Minister of Finance | Kim Hyun-chul | July 11, 1955 | May 26, 1956 |
| Minister of Finance | In Tae-sik | May 26, 1956 | June 9, 1957 |
| Minister of Finance | Kim Hyun-chul | June 9, 1957 | March 20, 1959 |
| Minister of Finance | Song In-sang | March 20, 1959 | April 28, 1960 |
| Minister of Foreign Affairs | Chang Taek-sang | August 15, 1948 | December 24, 1948 |
| Minister of Foreign Affairs | Lim Ben C. | December 25, 1948 | April 15, 1951 |
| Minister of Foreign Affairs | Pyon Yong-tae | April 16, 1951 | July 28, 1955 |
| Minister of Foreign Affairs | Cho Chung-whan | July 29, 1955 | December 21, 1959 |
| Minister of Foreign Affairs | Choi Kyu-hah (acting) | December 22, 1959 | April 24, 1960 |
| Minister of Health (merged into Minister of Health and Social Affairs) | Gu Yeong-suk | June 4, 1948 | November 26, 1950 |
| Minister of Health (merged into Minister of Health and Social Affairs) | Oh Han-young | November 26, 1950 | February 5, 1952 |
| Minister of Health (merged into Minister of Health and Social Affairs) | Choi Jae-yu | February 5, 1952 | February 16, 1955 |
| Minister of Health and Social Affairs (merger of Ministers of Health and Social Affairs) | Choi Jae-yu | February 17, 1955 | May 26, 1956 |
| Minister of Health and Social Affairs (merger of Ministers of Health and Social Affairs) | Jeong Jun-mo | May 26, 1956 | June 17, 1957 |
| Minister of Health and Social Affairs (merger of Ministers of Health and Social Affairs) | Son Chang-hwan | June 17, 1957 | April 28, 1960 |
| Minister of Home Affairs | Yun Chi-young | July 27, 1948 | December 24, 1948 |
| Minister of Home Affairs | Shin Song-mo | December 24, 1948 | March 21, 1949 |
| Minister of Home Affairs | Kim Hyo-seok | March 21, 1949 | February 7, 1950 |
| Minister of Home Affairs | Baek Seong-uk | February 7, 1950 | July 16, 1950 |
| Minister of Home Affairs | Chough Pyung-ok | July 17, 1950 | April 24, 1951 |
| Minister of Home Affairs | Chang Taek-sang (acting) | April 25, 1951 | May 13, 1951 |
| Minister of Home Affairs | Lee Soon-yong | May 14, 1951 | January 12, 1952 |
| Minister of Home Affairs | Jang Seok-yoon | January 12, 1952 | May 24, 1952 |
| Minister of Home Affairs | Lee Beom-seok | May 24, 1952 | July 22, 1952 |
| Minister of Home Affairs | Kim Tae-seon | July 24, 1952 | August 29, 1952 |
| Minister of Home Affairs | Jin Heon-sik | August 29, 1952 | September 19, 1953 |
| Minister of Home Affairs | Hwang Ho-hyeon (acting) | September 19, 1953 | September 20, 1953 |
| Minister of Home Affairs | Baek Han-seong | September 20, 1953 | April 23, 1955 |
| Minister of Home Affairs | Kim Hyung-geun | April 23, 1955 | May 21, 1956 |
| Minister of Home Affairs | Lee Ik-heung | May 21, 1956 | February 4, 1957 |
| Minister of Home Affairs | Jang Kyung-geun | February 4, 1957 | September 26, 1957 |
| Minister of Home Affairs | Lee Geun-jik | September 26, 1957 | June 17, 1958 |
| Minister of Home Affairs | Min Byeong-gi | June 17, 1958 | August 27, 1958 |
| Minister of Home Affairs | Kim Il-hwan | August 27, 1958 | March 20, 1959 |
| Minister of Home Affairs | Choi In-gyu | March 20, 1959 | March 23, 1960 |
| Minister of Home Affairs | Hong Jin-ki | March 23, 1960 | April 24, 1960 |
| Minister of Home Affairs | Lee Ho | April 25, 1960 | August 19, 1960 |
| Minister of Justice | Lee In | August 2, 1948 | June 5, 1949 |
| Minister of Justice | Gwon Seung-ryeol | June 6, 1949 | May 21, 1950 |
| Minister of Justice | Lee Woo-ik | May 22, 1950 | November 22, 1950 |
| Minister of Justice | Kim Chun-yon | November 23, 1950 | May 6, 1951 |
| Minister of Justice | Cho Chin-man | May 7, 1951 | March 4, 1952 |
| Minister of Justice | Seo Sang-hwan | March 5, 1952 | June 29, 1954 |
| Minister of Justice | Jo Yong-soon | June 30, 1954 | September 15, 1955 |
| Minister of Justice | Lee Ho | September 16, 1955 | February 19, 1958 |
| Minister of Justice | Hong Jin-ki | February 20, 1958 | March 23, 1960 |
| Minister of National Defense | Lee Beom-seok | August 15, 1948 | March 20, 1949 |
| Minister of National Defense | Shin Song-mo | March 21, 1949 | May 5, 1951 |
| Minister of National Defense | Lee Ki-poong | May 7, 1951 | March 29, 1952 |
| Minister of National Defense | Shin Tae-young | March 29, 1952 | June 30, 1953 |
| Minister of National Defense | Sohn Won-yil | June 30, 1953 | May 26, 1956 |
| Minister of National Defense | Kim Yong-woo | May 26, 1956 | July 6, 1957 |
| Minister of National Defense | Kim Chung-yul | July 6, 1957 | May 2, 1960 |
| Minister of Social Affairs (merged into Minister of Health and Social Affairs) | Jeon Jin-han | August 1, 1948 | December 24, 1948 |
| Minister of Social Affairs (merged into Minister of Health and Social Affairs) | Yi Yun-yong | December 24, 1948 | November 23, 1950 |
| Minister of Social Affairs (merged into Minister of Health and Social Affairs) | Ho Chong | November 23, 1950 | January 12, 1952 |
| Minister of Social Affairs (merged into Minister of Health and Social Affairs) | Choi Chang-soon | January 12, 1952 | October 9, 1952 |
| Minister of Social Affairs (merged into Minister of Health and Social Affairs) | Park Sool-eum | October 9, 1952 | February 16, 1955 |
| Minister of Transportation | Min Hee-sik | August 2, 1948 | October 4, 1948 |
| Minister of Transportation | Ho Chong | October 4, 1948 | May 10, 1950 |
| Minister of Transportation | Kim Seok-kwan | May 10, 1950 | February 3, 1953 |
| Minister of Transportation | Yoon Seong-sun | February 3, 1953 | February 10, 1954 |
| Minister of Transportation | Lee Jong-rim | February 10, 1954 | June 9, 1957 |
| Minister of Transportation | Moon Bong-je | June 9, 1957 | September 9, 1958 |
| Minister of Transportation | Choi In-gyu | September 9, 1958 | March 20, 1959 |
| Minister of Transportation | Kim Il-hwan | March 20, 1959 | April 28, 1960 |
