= Lee Young-hee =

- Hangul: 이영희
- RR: I Yeonghui
- MR: I Yŏnghŭi

Lee Young-hee (Korean: 이영희) is a Korean name consisting of the family name Lee and the given name Young-hee, and may also refer to:

- Lee Young-hee (designer) (1936–2018), South Korean designer
- Lee Young-hee (physicist) (born 1955), South Korean physicist
- Lee Young-hee (bureaucrat), South Korean bureaucrat and the 8th Commissioner of Korea Correctional Service
