= Lee Young-hee (civil servant) =

South Korean civil servant (born 1965)

- 이영희

Commissioner of the Korea Correctional Service
- In office 6 July 2020 – 30 June 2021
- President: Moon Jae-in
- Prime Minister: Chung Sye-kyun; Kim Boo-kyum
- Minister: Choo Mi-ae; Park Beom-kye
- Preceded by: Choi Kang-ju
- Succeeded by: Yoo Byung-cheol

Personal details
- Born: 1965 (age 60–61) South Korea
- Education: Wonkwang University; Korea University

Lee Young-hee (Korean: 이영희; born 1965) is a South Korean correctional bureaucrat served as the 8th Commissioner of the Korea Correctional Service - the first woman to lead KCS since its creation in 1948 - from 2020 to 2021.

After studying law and passing the state exam, Lee dedicated her career in public service - at KCS and its parent organisation, Ministry of Justice, in particular - for over thirty years. Before promoted to the head of KCS, Lee was leading the Department of Correctional Training at Institute of Justice, the research institute of Ministry of Justice. Previously, she led Ministry's Social Reintegration Division as well as KCS' Gimcheon Juvenile Prison, Hwaseong Vocational Training Prison, Gwangju Correctional Institution and Suwon Detention Center.

Lee holds two degrees - LLB from Wonkwang University and Master of Public Administration from Korea University.
