= Chang Chun-ha =

Korean journalist and activist (1918–1975)

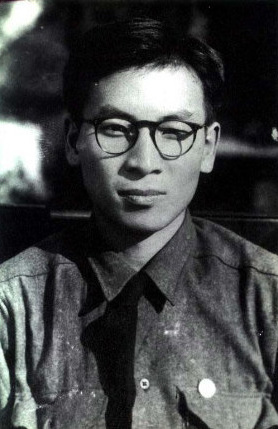
- Chang Chun-ha in 1944

Korean name
- Hangul: 장준하
- Hanja: 張俊河
- RR: Jang Junha
- MR: Chang Chunha

Chang Chun-ha (Korean: 장준하; August 27, 1918 in Uiju County – August 17, 1975 in Uijeongbu, Gyeonggi Province) was a Korean independence and democracy activist who later became a journalist in South Korea.

== Military career ==
When Korea was under Japanese rule, he participated in education activities and voluntarily joined the Japanese army called Sugada but he escaped the army in 1944 when he was in Suzhou, Jiangsu. His joining of Sugada army was only nominally voluntarily as it was forced by the Japanese army for Korean males to join the army. He then was trained at China Central Officer School and became a warrant officer in the Chinese Central Army. In 1945, he visited Korean Liberation Army located in Suzhou and joined the army from the February as a commissioned officer. While serving the Korean liberation army, he participated activities with the Office of Strategic Services (OSS; the predecessor of the CIA). In November 1945, he came back to Korea via the Provisional Government of the Republic of Korea.

== In politics ==
After returning to Korea, Chang worked as a secretary of Kim Ku and participated in Lee Beom-seok's Chosun Ethnic Youth League. After the establishment of Republic of Korea, during the First Republic of South Korea, he worked for the government as a secretary. In 1950, he was in charge of citizen spirit reformation in the Ministry of Education and Culture (문교부). In 1952, he was the directing manager of national ideology research institution. He also worked in two more positions in the Ministry of Education and Culture and founded a periodical called Sasanggye. He established the Dong-in Literary Award in 1956. Sasanggye acrimoniously denounced the Liberal Party administration and became the starting fire of the 4.19 revolution. After the 4.19 revolution took place, he took positions in the Ministry of Munkyo during the second republic.

After the May 16 coup, he opposed the South Korea–Japan conference and the sending of troops to Vietnam War. During the 1967 South Korean presidential election, he made an issue out of the career of Yun Bo-seon on Park Chung Hee's pro-Japanese and Workers' Party of South Korea activities. He was then sent into prison for insulting the head of the state. After he came out of prison, he worked with Yun Bo-seon and New Democratic Party (South Korea) in the Korean National Party.

From 1975, when he was preparing to fight against the Park Chung Hee administration, he died mysteriously in Pocheon, Gyeonggi Province. The South Korean government announced that Chang's death had been caused by loss of footing while climbing down a mountain. However, after Chang's death, continuous doubts were raised whether it was a homicide by Park's government and the only witness gave conflicting statements when questioned. Additionally, when Kim Jae-gyu became KCIA director in 1976, he purportedly told Jang's family privately with deep regret that Jang's death was not accidental as officially announced, but that the Park regime was involved. To such doubts, the Park administration declared the state of national emergency and arrested anyone who mentioned the death of Chang Chun-ha. In 2012, the death of Chang Chun-ha was re-investigated by the National Countermeasures Committee to Investigate the Suspected Assassination of Professor Jang Jun-ha, and his remains were exhumed and examined. Only a single circular skull fracture was documented by the forensic experts present, raising questions about the official verdict of a fall, but no official report or clear conclusions were released.

== Awards ==
Chang was the first Korean to win the 1962 Ramon Magsaysay Award for Journalism, Literature, and the Creative Communication Arts.

== See also ==
- Kim Kyusik
- Chang Myon
- Kim Dae-jung
- Kim Young-Sam
