= Kim Seung-kew =

South Korean politician (born 1944)

- Hangul: 김승규
- Hanja: 金昇圭
- RR: Gim Seunggyu
- MR: Kim Sŭnggyu

Kim Seung-kew (born July 20, 1944), also spelled Kim Seung-gyu, is a South Korean politician, lawyer and jurist who had served as the Minister of Justice from July 2004 to July 2005, and became the Director of the National Intelligence Service on July 5, 2005.

Kim Seung-kew was born in Gwangyang, Zenranan Province, Korea, Empire of Japan. He finished schooling at Suncheon Mesan High School, and graduated from the Seoul National University, Law Department, BL.

== Career ==
- 1970 – 12th Korean Bar,
- 1999 - Head of Public Prosecutors' Office at Suwon,
- 2001 – 42nd Deputy Minister of Justice of Korea,
- 2002 - Vice Chief Public Prosecutor of the Supreme Public Prosecutor's Office of Korea,
- 2002 - Chief Public Prosecutor of the Pusan Higher Public Prosecutor's Office,
- 2004 – 56th Minister of Justice of Korea,
- 2005 – 27th Director of the National Intelligence Service of Korea.
- At the moment - LOGOS Law Firm.

== See also ==
- Politics of South Korea
- Government of South Korea

Political offices
Preceded by Kang Kum-sil	Minister of Justice of the Republic of Korea; 2004–2005	Succeeded by Chun Jung-bae
