= Park Soon-yong =

South Korean lawyer (1945–2026)

- 박순용

Prosecutor General of South Korea
- In office 26 May 1999 – 25 May 2001
- Preceded by: Kim Tae-jung
- Succeeded by: Sin Seung-nam

Personal details
- Born: 29 May 1945 Gumi, Korea, Japan
- Died: 11 January 2026 (aged 80)
- Education: Seoul National University (LLB)
- Occupation: Lawyer

Park Soon-yong (Korean: 박순용; 29 May 1945 – 11 January 2026) was a South Korean lawyer. He served as prosecutor general from 1999 to 2001.

Park died on 11 January 2026, at the age of 80.
