= Kang Chang-hee =

South Korean politician (born 1946)

The Right Honourable Kang Chang-hee
- 강창희
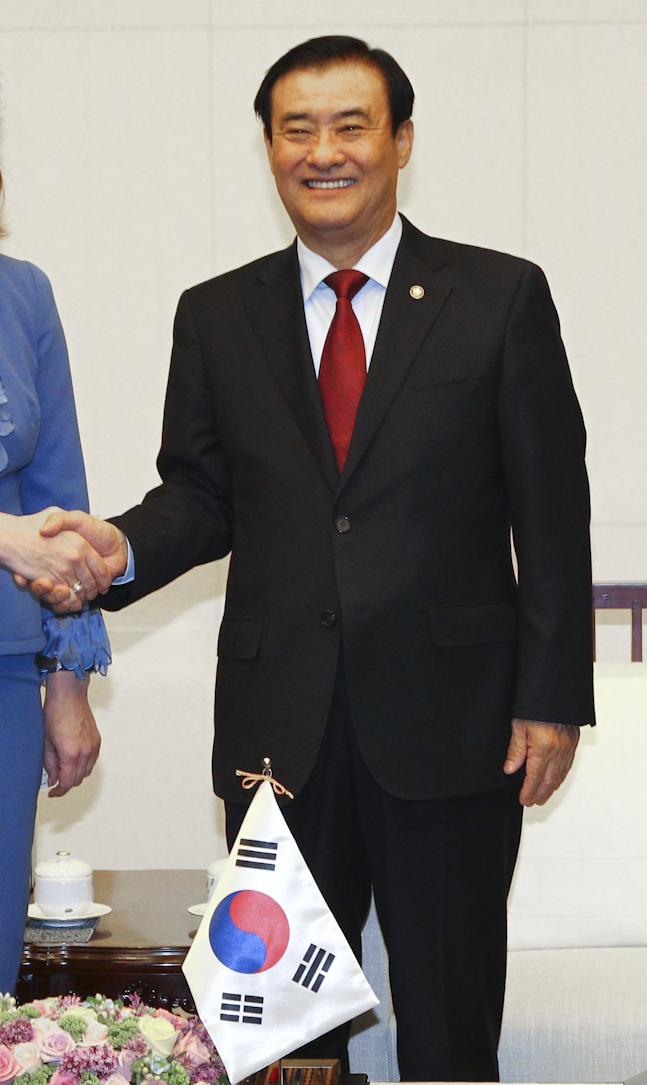

Speaker of the National Assembly
- In office 2 July 2012 – 29 May 2014
- President: Lee Myung-bak; Park Geun-hye
- Deputy: Lee Byung-seok; Park Byeong-seug
- Preceded by: Park Hee-tae; Chung Ui-hwa (acting)
- Succeeded by: Chung Ui-hwa

Minister of Science and Technology
- In office 3 March 1998 – 22 March 1999
- President: Kim Dae-jung
- Preceded by: Kwon Sook-il
- Succeeded by: Seo Jeong-wook

Member of the National Assembly
- In office 30 May 2012 – 29 May 2016
- Preceded by: Kwon Sun-taek
- Succeeded by: Lee Eun-kwon
- Constituency: Jung District (Daejeon)
- In office 30 May 1992 – 29 May 2004
- Preceded by: Kim Hong-man
- Succeeded by: Kwon Sun-taek
- Constituency: Jung District (Daejeon)
- In office 11 April 1985 – 29 May 1988
- Preceded by: Ryu In-beom; Lee Jae-hwan
- Succeeded by: Kim Hong-man
- Constituency: Daejeon Jung District (South Chungcheong)

Personal details
- Born: 3 August 1946 (age 80) Daejeon, southern Korea
- Party: Independent
- Education: Korea Military Academy; Kyungnam University

Korean name
- Hangul: 강창희
- Hanja: 姜昌熙
- RR: Gang Changhui
- MR: Kang Ch'anghŭi

Kang Chang-hee (Korean: 강창희; born 3 August 1946) is a South Korean politician who was the Speaker of the 19th National Assembly of South Korea, succeeding acting Speaker Chung Eui-hwa on 2 July 2012, for a two-year term. Kang was a member of the Saenuri Party (New Frontier Party, formerly the Grand National Party), which holds the largest number of seats in the 2012–2016 National Assembly. He was selected as the party candidate for Speaker on 31 May 2012, which effectively guaranteed he would become Speaker. He was officially elected when the National Assembly convened on 2 July 2012, gaining 195 of 283 votes. On assuming the office of Speaker, Kang was legally required, by the National Assembly Act, to become an unaffiliated member of the National Assembly. In 2024, he was appointed as the chairman of the 2027 Summer World University Games organising committee by the ministry of Culture, Sports and Tourism.

== Career ==
Kang was a member of the South Korean military, before becoming a politician in 1980. He has served six non-consecutive terms as a member of the National Assembly (in the 11th, 12th, 14th, 15th, 16th and 19th National Assemblies), and is the first Speaker from the Chungcheong provinces. Previously he has held a number of posts including vice-president of the Grand National Party (November 2001 to March 2002) and as a Minister of Science and Technology (March 1998 to March 1999).

On the 2013 South Korean Constitution Day (17 July), Kang proposed an "advisory council for constitutional amendment", which was formed on 24 January 2014, with 15 members including academics, journalists and former judicial and government officials. On 28 November 2013, the Saenuri Party controversially elected their preferred candidate to head the Board of Audit and Inspection, after Kang refused to allow speeches by members of the opposition Democratic Party, although the opposition felt that Kang was not permitted to do so by law.

As part of his official duties, he has met a number of foreign dignitaries when they visited South Korea, and visited a number of countries. On 16 October 2012, Kang visited the University of Southern California, to look at the East Asian Library's collection of maps of the body of water between Korea and Japan, known then as the Sea of Korea and now known as the Sea of Japan. On 2 April 2013, Kang addressed the Congress of Peru during an official visit to Lima. Kang met the Secretary General of NATO, Anders Fogh Rasmussen during the latter's visit to South Korea from 11–13 April 2013. On 9 October 2013, Kang visited Turkey to meet the Turkish President, Abdullah Gül, and spoke about the Turkish military contribution to the Korean War. On 17 October 2013 he met Rwandan Minister Louise Mushikiwabo after she attended a cyberspace conference in Seoul. Kang travelled to Beijing on 4 December 2013, to meet Zhang Dejiang, chairman of the Standing Committee of the National People's Congress of China, followed by a meeting with China's paramount leader Xi Jinping on 6 December, with both meetings focussing on China–South Korea relations and cooperation.

He is currently President of the 2027 Summer World University Games Organising Committee, after being appointed to the position on 11 March, 2024. The multisport event will be held across several cities in Chungcheong in August 2027.

== Election results ==
| Year | Elections | Constituency | Political party | Votes (%) | Results |
|---|---|---|---|---|---|
| 1981 | 11th National Assembly General Election | National (69th) | DJP | 5,776,624 (35.64%) | Not Elected→Elected |
| 1985 | 12th National Assembly General Election | Daejeon Jung (South Chungcheong) | DJP | 73,698 (32.06%) | Won |
| 1988 | 13th National Assembly General Election | Daejeon Jung (South Chungcheong) | DJP | 33,728 (25.92%) | Defeated (2nd) |
| 1992 | 14th National Assembly General Election | Jung (Daejeon) | Independent | 46,533 (34.77%) | Won |
| 1996 | 15th National Assembly General Election | Jung (Daejeon) | ULD | 62,716 (58.51%) | Won |
| 2000 | 16th National Assembly General Election | Jung (Daejeon) | ULD | 41,687 (45.65%) | Won |
| 2004 | 17th National Assembly General Election | Jung (Daejeon) | GNP | 38,457 (33.43%) | Defeated (2nd) |
| 2008 | 18th National Assembly General Election | Jung (Daejeon) | GNP | 37,258 (39.50%) | Defeated (2nd) |
| 2012 | 19th National Assembly General Election | Jung (Daejeon) | Saenuri | 48,934 (42.73%) | Won |

Political offices
| Preceded by Park Hee-tae; Chung Ui-hwa (acting) | Speaker of the National Assembly of South Korea; 3 July 2012 – 29 May 2014 | Succeeded by Chung Ui-hwa |
