= Seo Dong-kown =

South Korean lawyer (1932–2025)

Seo Dong-kown (Korean: 서동권; October 30, 1932 – November 29, 2025) was a South Korean lawyer.

== Life and career ==
Seo Dong-Kown was born in Gyeongsangbuk-do on October 30, 1932. After completing military service, he was appointed a prosecutor at the Seoul District Prosecutor's Office in 1961. During the Fifth Republic, he served as Deputy Minister of Justice and Prosecutor General, and during the Sixth Republic, he served as the Deputy Minister of National Security.

Seo died on November 29, 2025, at the age of 93.
