= Kang Kum-sil =

South Korean politician (born 1957)

- Hangul: 강금실
- Hanja: 康錦實
- RR: Gang Geumsil
- MR: Kang Kŭmsil

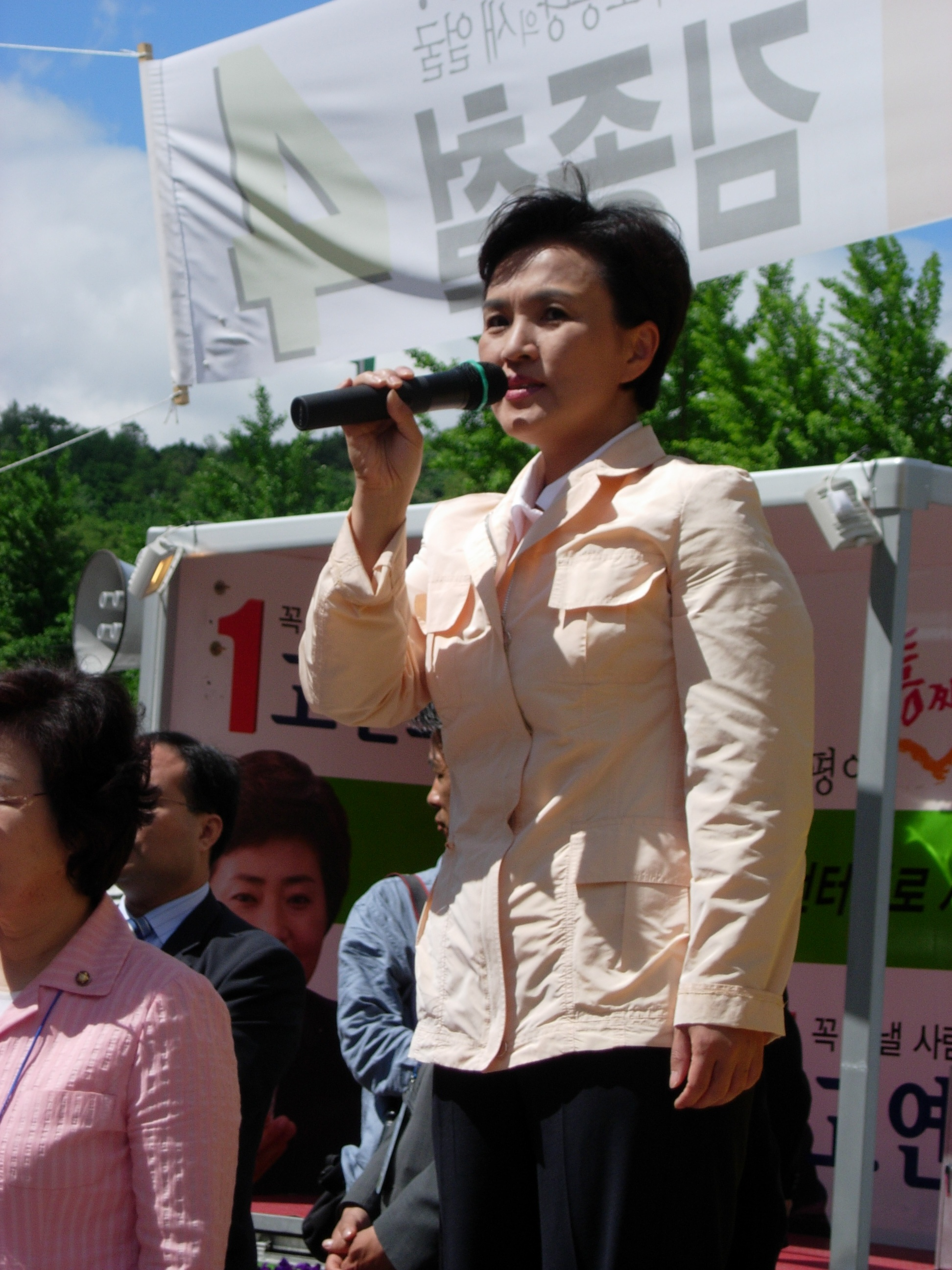

Kang Kum-Sil (Korean: 강금실; born February 12, 1957) is a South Korean politician and a lawyer, and also served as the minister of justice from February 2003 to July 2004. She was the ruling Uri Party mayoral candidate for Seoul (lost to Oh Se-hoon of Grand National Party), and is a graduate of Seoul National University with a degree in Law.

== Election results ==
=== Local elections ===
==== Mayor of Seoul ====
| Year | Elections | Constituency | Political party | Votes (%) | Remarks |
|---|---|---|---|---|---|
| 2006 | 4th Iocal Election | Seoul (Mayoral Elections) | Uri | 1,077,890 (27.31%) | Defeated (2nd) |

Political offices
| Preceded by Sim Sang-myoung | Minister of Justice of the Republic of Korea; 2003–2004 | Succeeded by Kim Seung-kew |
