= Cho Chin-man =

South Korean jurist (1903–1979)

- 조진만
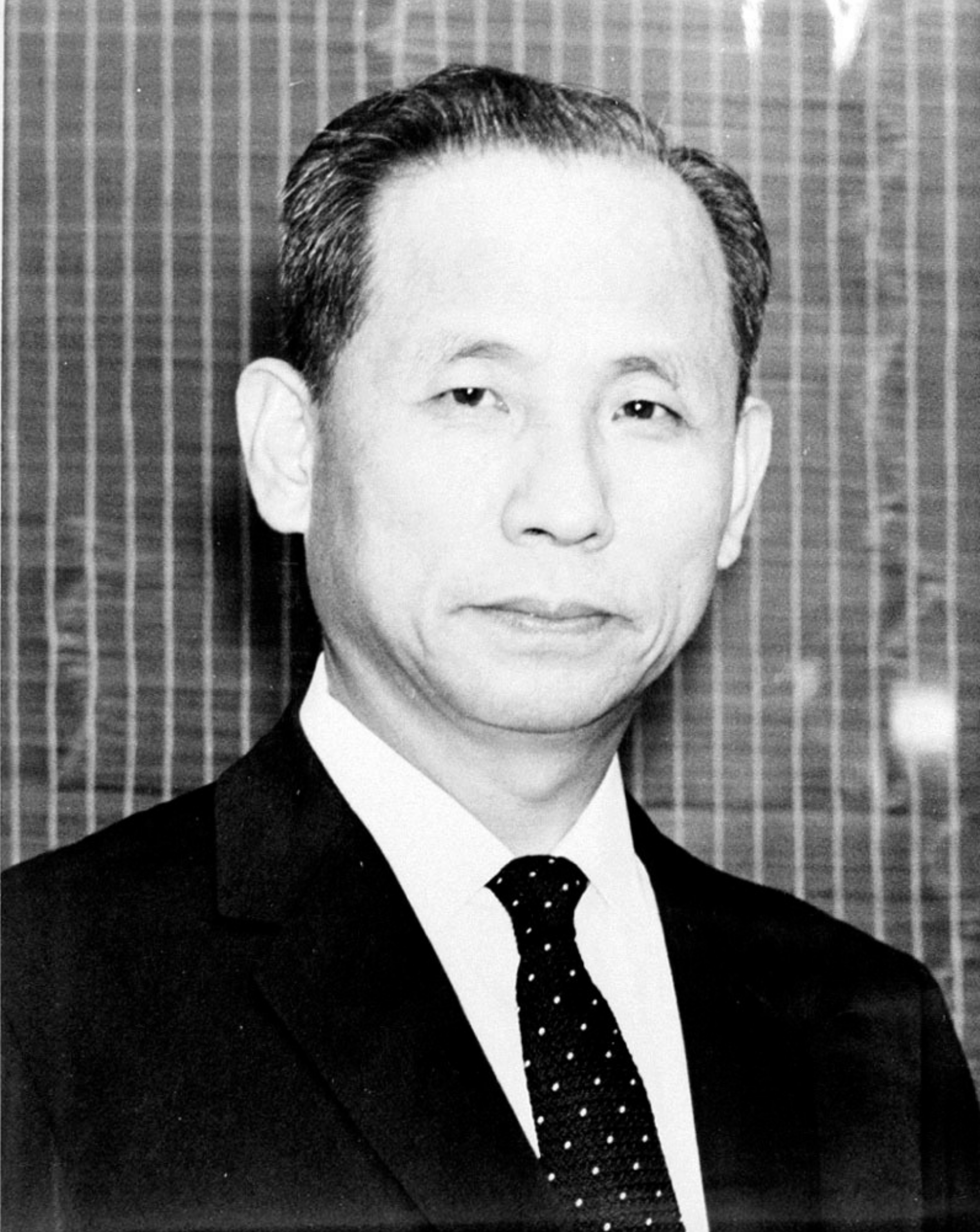
- Cho in 1961

3rd & 4th Chief Justice of the Supreme Court of Korea
- In office June 30, 1961 – October 19, 1968
- Preceded by: Cho Yong-sun
- Succeeded by: Min Bok-ki

5th Minister of Justice
- In office May 7, 1951 – March 4, 1952
- President: Syngman Rhee
- Preceded by: Kim Chun-yon
- Succeeded by: Seo Sang-hwan

Personal details
- Born: October 20, 1903 Incheon, Gyeonggi Province, Korean Empire
- Died: February 12, 1979 (aged 75)

Korean name
- Hangul: 조진만
- Hanja: 趙鎭滿
- RR: Jo Jinman
- MR: Cho Chinman

Cho Chin-man (Korean: 조진만; October 20, 1903 – February 12, 1979) was a South Korean jurist who served as the third and fourth chief justice of the Supreme Court of Korea from June 30, 1961, to October 10, 1968. He previously served as the fifth minister of justice for South Korea from May 7, 1951, to March 4, 1952.

== Biography ==
Cho was born on October 20, 1903, in Incheon. In 1923, he graduated from Gyeongseong Law School. In 1925, he was the first Korean to pass the Japanese civil service examination for judges. In 1927, he served as a judge for the Haeju District Court. He joined the Pyongyang District Court in 1929 and the Pyongyang Appellate Court in 1930. Cho then went to Daegu where he served as a judge on the Daegu High Court in 1933 and was promoted to chief judge for the Daegu District Court in 1939. In 1943, Cho started a law firm.

From May 7, 1951, to March 4, 1952, Cho served as the fifth minister of justice. He was also the first president of the Seoul Bar Association in 1960 and served as an advisor to the Ministry of Justice in 1961. Cho also served as the third and fourth chief justice of the South Korea Supreme Court from June 30, 1961, to October 19, 1968.

Cho died on February 12, 1979.

Legal offices
Preceded by Kim Chun-yon	Minister of Justice; 1951–1952	Succeeded by Seo Sang-hwan
Preceded by Cho Yong-sun	Chief Justice of the Supreme Court of Korea; 1961–1968	Succeeded by Min Bok-ki
