= Chung Ui-hwa =

South Korean politician (born 1948)

The Right Honourable Chung Ui-hwa
- 정의화
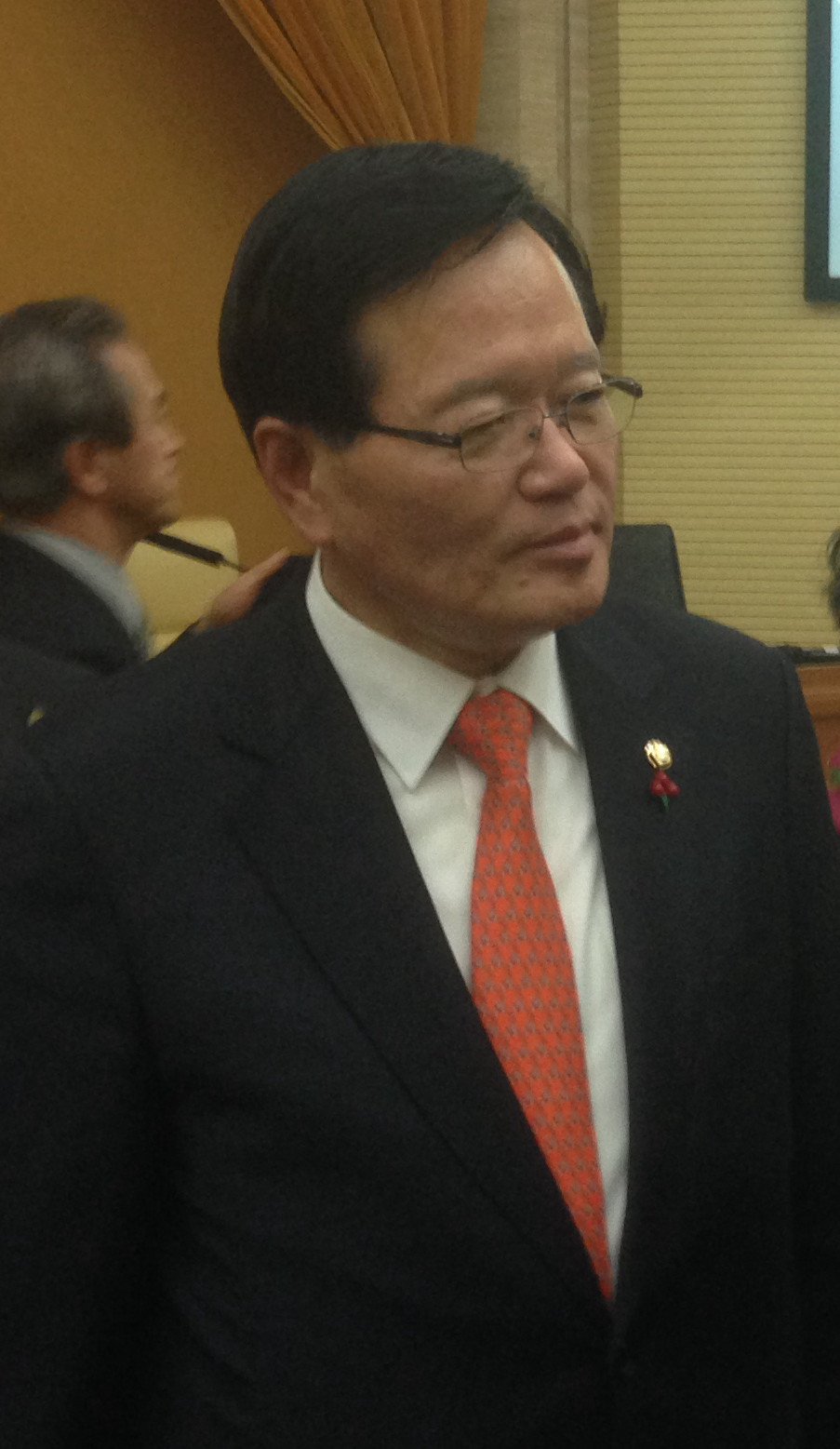

Speaker of the National Assembly
- In office 30 May 2014 – 29 May 2016
- Preceded by: Kang Chang-hee
- Succeeded by: Chung Sye-kyun

Member of the National Assembly
- In office 30 May 2008 – 29 May 2012
- Succeeded by: Yoo Ki-joon (partially); Kim Moo-sung (partially)
- Constituency: Busan; Jung-gu; Dong-gu
- In office 30 May 2004 – 29 May 2008
- Constituency: Busan; Jung-gu; Dong-gu
- In office 30 May 2000 – 29 May 2004
- Constituency: Busan; Jung-gu; Dong-gu
- In office 30 May 1996 – 29 May 2000
- Constituency: Busan; Jung-gu; Dong-gu

Personal details
- Born: December 18, 1948 (age 77) Jinhae-eup, Changwon-gun, South Gyeongsang Province, South Korea
- Party: People Power
- Other political affiliations: Saenuri Party; Grand National Party; New Korea Party
- Education: Pusan National University (MD); Chonnam National University (Hon. Ph.D. in Law, 2015)
- Alma mater: Pusan National University

Korean name
- Hangul: 정의화
- Hanja: 鄭義和
- RR: Jeong Uihwa
- MR: Chŏng Ŭihwa

Chung Ui-hwa (Korean: 정의화; Hanja: 鄭義和; born 18 December 1948) is a South Korean doctor and politician who served as Speaker of the National Assembly from 2014 to 2016.

== Early life and education ==
Chung Eui-hwa was born in Changwon-gun, South Gyeongsang Province, South Korea on December 18, 1948. He graduated from Pusan National University medical school.

== Election results ==
Year	Elections	Constituency	Political party	Votes (%)	Results
1996	15th National Assembly General Election	Jung–Dong (Busan)	NKP	41,185 (41.62%)	Won
2000	16th National Assembly General Election	Jung–Dong (Busan)	GNP	48,924 (57.72%)	Won
2004	17th National Assembly General Election	Jung–Dong (Busan)	GNP	49,857 (59.56%)	Won
2008	18th National Assembly General Election	Jung–Dong (Busan)	GNP	32,669 (66.35%)	Won
2012	19th National Assembly General Election	Jung–Dong (Busan)	Saenuri	31,484 (48.14%)	Won

== Political career ==
Chung became a politician in 1996 when he ran in the 1996 South Korean legislative election for the Busan Jung-gu · Dong-gu electoral district and won with 41.6% of the vote. He continuously won the Busan Jung-gu · Dong-gu electoral district until 2012.

Chung was pro-Lee Myung-bak during the 2007 South Korean presidential election.

He assumed the position of Speaker of the National Assembly on May 30, 2014. Since then, Chung has been an independent and critical of the pro-Park Geun-hye faction of the Liberty Korea Party.

Political offices
Preceded by Kang Chang-hee	Speaker of the National Assembly of South Korea; 30 May 2014 – 29 May 2016	Succeeded by Chung Sye-kyun
Preceded by Lee Yun-seong; Moon Hee-sang	Deputy Speaker of the National Assembly; Serving with Hong Jae-hyung; 8 June 2010–29 May 2012	Succeeded by Lee Byung-suk; Park Byeong-seug
Preceded by Park Hee-tae	Acting Speaker of the National Assembly of South Korea; 28 February 2012–29 May 2012	Succeeded by Kang Chang-hee
National Assembly of the Republic of Korea
Preceded by Jung Sang-cheon (Jung, Busan); Huh Sam-soo (Dong, Busan)	Member of the National Assembly for Jung–Dong (Busan); 30 May 1996 – 29 May 2016	Succeeded by Kim Moo-sung (Jung–Yeongdo, Busan); Yoo Ki-joon (Seo–Dong, Busan)
