= Park Hee-tae =

South Korean politician (born 1938)

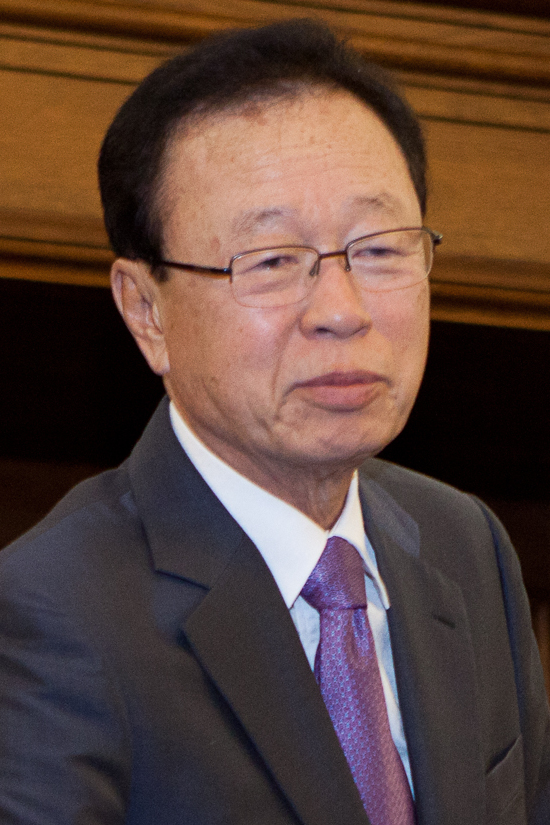
- Park in 2011

Speaker of the National Assembly
- In office June 8, 2010 – February 27, 2012
- Preceded by: Kim Hyong-o
- Succeeded by: Chung Ui-hwa (acting); Kang Chang-hee

Minister of Justice
- In office February 26, 1993 – March 7, 1993
- President: Kim Young-sam
- Preceded by: Lee Jung-woo
- Succeeded by: Kim Doo-hee

Personal details
- Born: August 9, 1938 (age 88) Namhae County, Korea, Empire of Japan

Park Hee-tae (Korean: 박희태; born August 9, 1938) is a South Korean politician. He was a member of the and Speaker of the National Assembly and Minister of Justice. Park resigned due to a bribery scandal. Park was sentenced to 8 months in prison due to the bribery, but he was later pardoned.

== Biography ==
Park was born in Namhae County, Korea, Empire of Japan. Before he was elected to the National Assembly, Park was a prosecutor for 20 years. Park was Party Chairman in the July 2008 Grand National Party Convention. Park was first elected to the National Assembly in 1988. Park was elected Speaker of the National Assembly on June 8, 2010. From February 26, 1993, to March 7, 1993, Park was the Minister of Justice.

In January 2012, the Democratic Unity Party started an investigation into accusations that legislators received 3 million won for them voting for Park in the 2008 chairmanship election. On February 9, 2012, Park resigned over the scandal. Prosecutors waited until Park resigned to investigate further into the incident. Park was sentenced to eight months in prison, but was pardoned by President Lee Myung-bak in January 2013. He began teaching at the law school of Konkuk University in the spring semester of 2013.

== Election results ==
Year	Elections	Constituency	Political party	Votes (%)	Results
1988	13th National Assembly General Election	Namhae–Hadong (South Gyeongsang)	DJP	46,381 (52.93%)	Won
1992	14th National Assembly General Election	Namhae–Hadong (South Gyeongsang)	DLP	49,378 (60.22%)	Won
1996	15th National Assembly General Election	Namhae–Hadong (South Gyeongsang)	NKP	49,874 (75.83%)	Won
2000	16th National Assembly General Election	Namhae–Hadong (South Gyeongsang)	GNP	38,615 (59.63%)	Won
2004	17th National Assembly General Election	Namhae–Hadong (South Gyeongsang)	GNP	34,106 (53.50%)	Won
2009	2009 By-election	Yangsan (South Gyeongsang)	GNP	30,801 (38.13%)	Won
