= Lee Jung-woo =

South Korean lawyer and politician (1931–2024)

- 이정우

Minister of Justice
- In office 9 October 1992 – 25 February 1993
- Preceded by: Kim Ki-chun
- Succeeded by: Park Hee-tae

Personal details
- Born: 16 April 1931 Jinju, Korea, Empire of Japan
- Died: 29 January 2024 (aged 92)
- Education: Korea University
- Occupation: Lawyer

Lee Jung-woo (Korean: 이정우; 16 April 1931 – 29 January 2024) was a South Korean lawyer and politician.

== Career ==
He served as Minister of Justice from 1992 to 1993, Lee became a judge in 1960. In 1981, he became a Supreme Court justice. After retiring as a judge, he was appointed a justice minister, serving from 1992 to 1993. Lee died on 29 January 2024, at the age of 92.
