= Gwon Seung-ryeol =

South Korean jurist (1895–1980)

- 권승렬
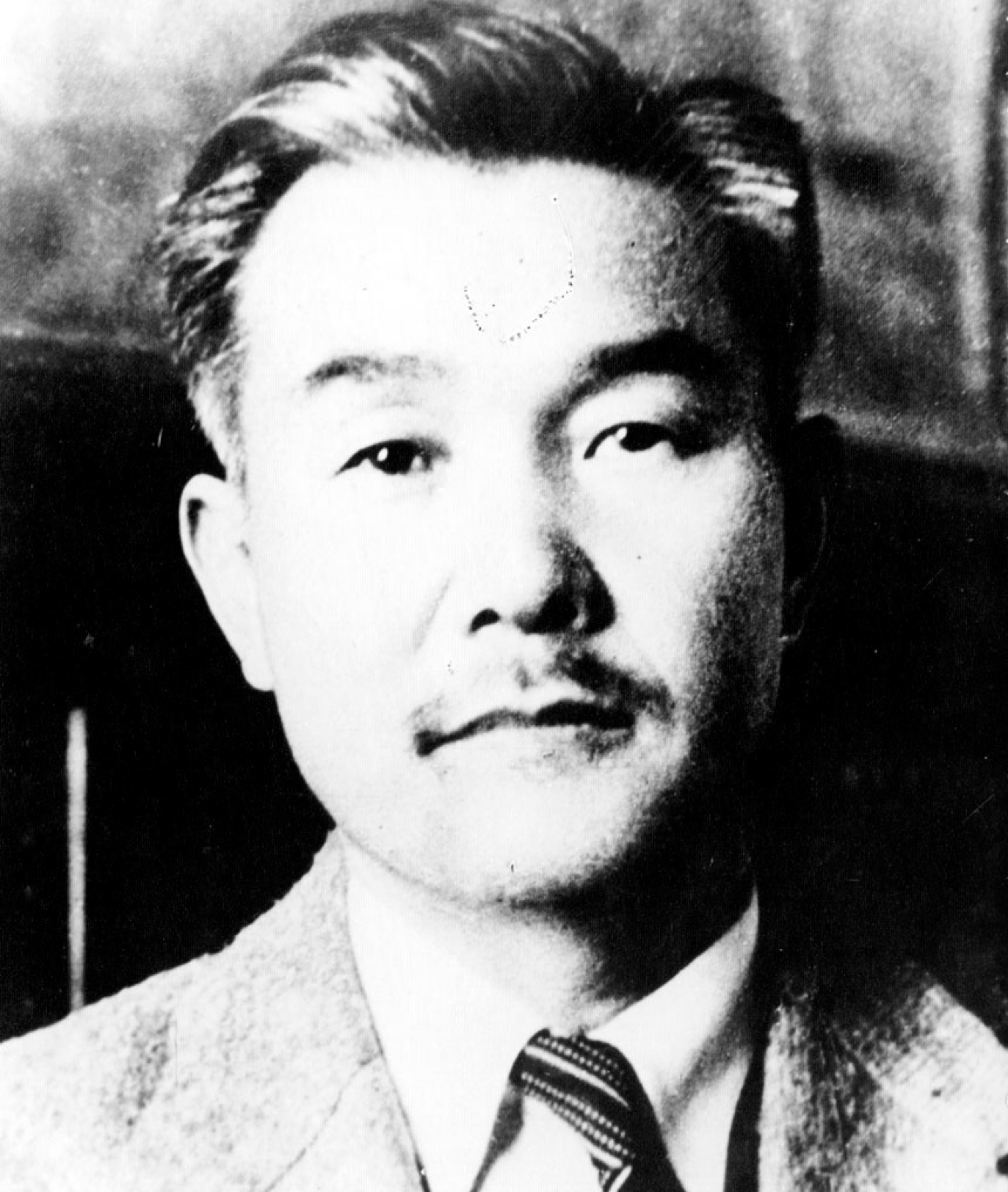
- Gwon in 1949

2nd & 10th Minister of Justice
- In office June 6, 1949 – May 21, 1950
- President: Syngman Rhee
- Preceded by: Lee In
- Succeeded by: Lee Woo-ik
- In office April 25, 1960 – August 19, 1960
- President: Ho Chong
- Preceded by: Hong Jin-ki
- Succeeded by: Jo Jae-chun

1st Prosecutor General of South Korea
- In office October 31, 1948 – June 6, 1949
- President: Syngman Rhee
- Preceded by: Office established
- Succeeded by: Kim Ik-jin

Personal details
- Born: 1895 Andong, Joseon
- Died: September 30, 1980 (aged 84–85) Yeouido-dong, Seoul, South Korea

Korean name
- Hangul: 권승렬
- Hanja: 權承烈
- RR: Gwon Seungryeol
- MR: Kwŏn Sŭngnyŏl

Gwon Seung-ryeol (Korean: 권승렬; 1895 – September 30, 1980) was a South Korean politician and lawyer who served as the second minister of justice for South Korea from June 6, 1949, to May 21, 1950, and the tenth minister of justice in 1960 from April 25 to August 19. He previously served as the first prosecutor general from October 31, 1948, to June 6, 1949.

== Biography ==
Gwon was born in 1895 during the 32nd year of King Gojong's reign in Andong, North Gyeongsang Province, Joseon. In 1908, he studied Japanese at the Hanseong Foreign Language School, graduating in 1911. In 1916, he began working for the Government-General of Korea as an apprentice officer in Yeonbaek County. Gwon left his government post in 1920 and began studying law at the Chuo University in Tokyo, Japan in 1922. He graduated in 1926 at the top of his class.

Gwon returned to Korea in 1926 and practiced law in Seoul. He provided free legal representation to Korean independence activists; his clients included those involved in the Gando Communist Party Incident and Gwangju Student Independence Movement. He also represented figures such as Ahn Chai-hong, Baek Gwan-su, Lyuh Woon-hyung, and Ahn Chang Ho. Following Korea's liberation from Japan in 1945, Gwon was a founding member of the Democratic Party of Korea. He also served as a deputy director for the Judicial Officers Training Institute and a director for the Legislation Bureau of the interim government's Judicial Department before becoming deputy director of the Judicial Department in 1948.

On October 31, 1948, Gwon was appointed the first prosecutor general of South Korea. In this position, he also served as the deputy minister of justice and director of the Special Prosecutor's Office for Anti-National Activities. On June 6, 1949, President Syngman Rhee appointed Gwon as the minister of justice. Gwon's first term as minister of justice ended on May 21, 1950, after being dismissed by President Rhee. Gwon also served as minister of justice in 1960 from April 25 to August 19.

Gwon died on September 30, 1980, at his home in Yeouido-dong, Seoul.

Legal offices
| Preceded by Office established | Prosecutor General of South Korea; 1948–1949 | Succeeded by Kim Ik-jin |
| Preceded by Lee In | Minister of Justice; 1949–1950 | Succeeded by Lee Woo-ik |
| Preceded by Hong Jin-ki | Minister of Justice; 1960 | Succeeded by Jo Jae-chun |
