= 1967 South Korean presidential election =

- 3 May 1967
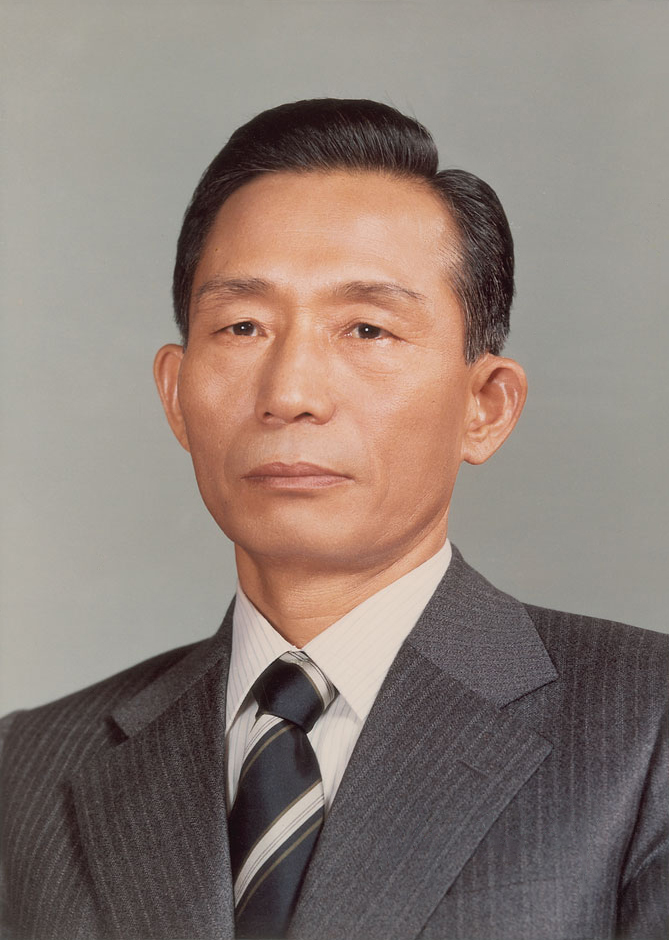

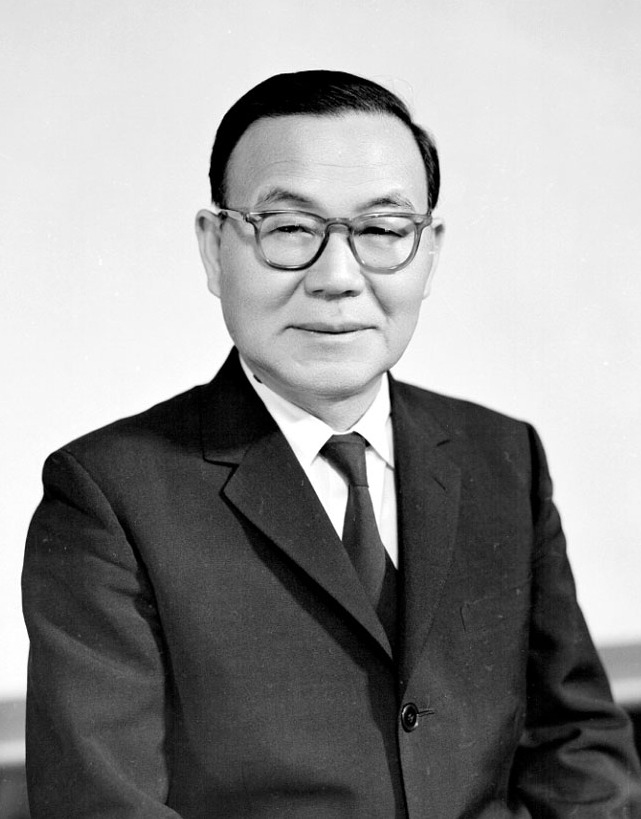
Nominee	Park Chung Hee	Yun Po-sun
Party	Democratic Republican	New Democratic
Popular vote	5,688,666	4,526,541
Percentage	51.44%	40.93%
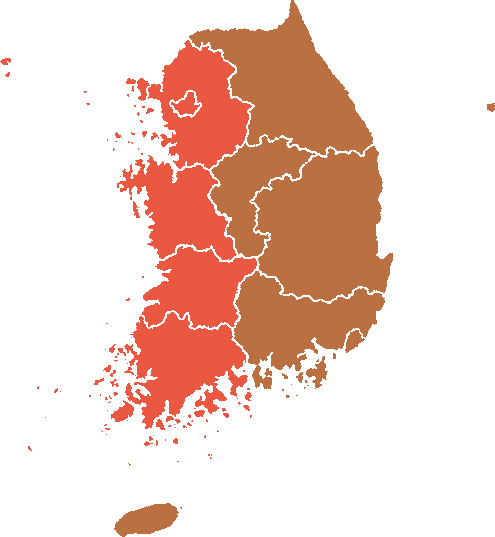
President before election
Park Chung Hee
Democratic Republican
Elected President
Park Chung Hee
Democratic Republican

Presidential elections were held in South Korea on 3 May 1967. The result was a victory for Park Chung Hee, who received 51% of the vote. Voter turnout was 84%.

== Nominations ==
=== Military ===
The Democratic Republican Party National Convention was held on 2 February and President Park Chung Hee was nominated as its presidential candidate without a vote.

=== Civilian ===
In May 1965 the two largest opposition parties in the parliament, former president Yun Posun's Civil Rule Party (CRP) and stateswoman Park Soon-cheon's Democratic Party (DP), joined to create the People's Party (PP), forming a united opposition against President Park Chung Hee's military dictatorship.

However, in 1965 the radical wing of the People's Party led by Yun left the party, later forming the New Korea Party (NKP) in 1966. The NKP and nominated Yun for president. The remaining members of the People's Party, the moderates led by Park Sang-cheon, nominated former president of Korea University Yu Jin-oh.

Fearing that running two candidates to represent the civilian field might result in Park winning easily, the two parties decided to join forces and created the New Democratic Party (NDP) on 7 February, agreeing to nominate Yun as its candidate.

== Results ==
Candidate	Party	Votes	%
Park Chung Hee	Democratic Republican Party	5,688,666	51.44
Yun Posun	New Democratic Party	4,526,541	40.93
Oh Jae-young	United Korea Party	264,533	2.39
Kim Chun-yon	People's Party	248,369	2.25
Chun Jin-han	Korea Independence Party	232,179	2.10
Lee Se-chin	Justice Party	98,433	0.89
Total		11,058,721	100.00
Valid votes		11,058,721	94.96
Invalid/blank votes		586,494	5.04
Total votes		11,645,215	100.00
Registered voters/turnout		13,935,093	83.57
Source: Nohlen et al.

=== By province and city ===
Province/City	Park Chung Hee		Yun Po-sun		Oh Jae-young		Kim Chun-yon		Chun Jin-han		Lee Se-chin	
Province/City	Votes	%	Votes	%	Votes	%	Votes	%	Votes	%	Votes	%
Seoul	595,513	45.19	675,716	51.28	11,447	0.87	13,142	1.00	14,242	1.08	7,635	0.58
Busan	338,135	64.21	164,077	31.16	9,922	1.88	6,866	1.30	4,556	0.87	3,028	0.58
Gyeonggi	525,676	40.98	674,964	52.62	22,383	1.75	23,248	1.81	25,306	1.97	11,029	0.86
Gangwon	429,589	51.26	349,807	41.74	18,211	2.17	17,757	2.12	15,400	1.84	7,310	0.87
North Chungcheong	269,830	46.58	252,469	43.58	15,058	2.60	14,526	2.51	20,345	3.51	7,114	1.23
South Chungcheong	489,516	45.37	505,076	46.81	17,662	1.64	27,295	2.53	28,809	2.67	10,560	0.98
North Jeolla	392,037	42.32	451,611	48.75	21,527	2.32	23,945	2.58	28,943	3.12	8,325	0.90
South Jeolla	652,847	44.58	682,622	46.62	42,249	2.89	46,721	3.19	28,156	1.92	11,774	0.80
North Gyeongsang	1,083,939	64.01	447,082	26.40	56,328	3.33	40,884	2.41	45,482	2.69	19,647	1.16
South Gyeongsang	838,426	68.61	281,545	23.04	45,325	3.71	30,740	2.52	16,065	1.31	9,895	0.81
Jeju	73,158	56.54	41,572	32.13	4,421	3.42	3,245	2.51	4,875	3.77	2,116	1.64
Total	5,688,666	51.44	4,526,541	40.93	264,533	2.39	248,369	2.25	232,179	2.10	98,433	0.89
