= Lee In (politician) =

South Korean lawyer and politician (1896–1979)

- 이인
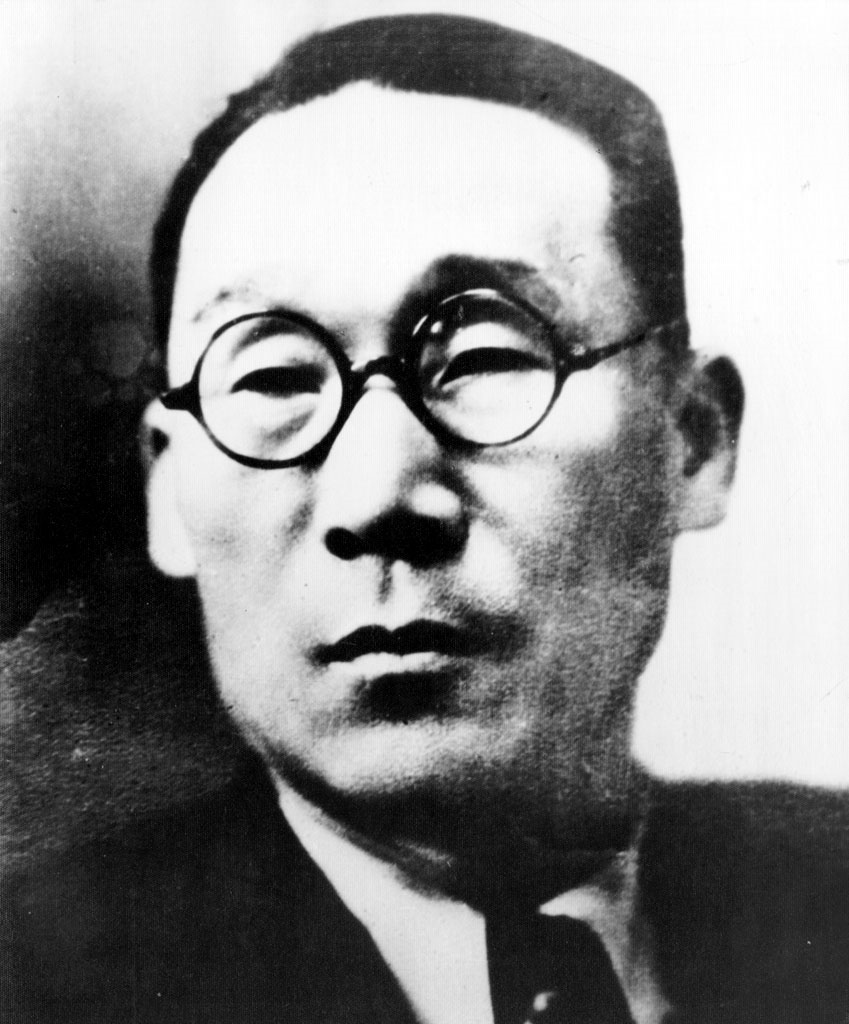

1st Minister of Justice
- In office August 2, 1948 – June 5, 1949
- President: Syngman Rhee
- Preceded by: Office established
- Succeeded by: Gwon Seung-ryeol

Personal details
- Born: September 20, 1896 Daegu, Joseon
- Died: April 5, 1979 (aged 82)

Korean name
- Hangul: 이인
- Hanja: 李仁
- RR: I In
- MR: I In

Lee In (Korean: 이인; Hanja: 李仁; September 20, 1896 – April 5, 1979) was a South Korean politician and lawyer who served as the first minister of justice for South Korea from August 2, 1948, to June 5, 1949.

== Biography ==
Lee was born on September 20, 1896, in Daegu to Lee Jong-yeong and Jeong Bok-hee. After graduating from Daldong High School in Daegu and Gyeongbuk Industrial Supplementary School, he moved to Japan to continue his studies in 1912. In Japan, he graduated from Seisoku Middle School and studied law at Nihon University and Meiji University. While he returned to Korea upon graduation, he moved back to Japan in 1919 after the beginning of the March First Movement and passed Japan's bar exam in 1922.

In May 1923, he opened a law office in Seoul and began providing legal representation to Korean independence activists. His clients included those involved in the second Uiyeoldan incident, the June Tenth Movement, and the Gwangju Student Movement. In 1925, he also joined the Korean Language Research Association as a founding member of its dictionary compilation project. During the Korean Language Society incident in December 1942, Lee was arrested by Japanese police and tortured for his involvement in the Korean Language Society. In January 1945, Lee was sentenced to two years in prison with three years of probation.

Following the liberation of Korea, Lee became a founding member of the Democratic Party of Korea. In October 1945, the United States Military Government in Korea appointed Lee as chief justice and chairman of the Special Criminal Review Committee. In 1946, Lee became the prosecutor general and oversaw counterfeiting investigations. On August 2, 1948, he was appointed the first minister of justice for South Korea and in March 1949, he was elected to the Constitutional Assembly. On June 5, 1949, he resigned from his post as minister of justice due to disagreements with President Syngman Rhee.

Lee died on April 5, 1979, and was buried at the National Seoul Memorial Park Patriots' Cemetery. Upon his death, he donated all of his property to the Korean Language Society.

Legal offices
Preceded by Office established	Minister of Justice; 1948–1949	Succeeded by Gwon Seung-ryeol
