= Supreme Prosecutors' Office of the Republic of Korea =

Prosecution service of South Korea

Supreme Prosecutors' Office
- 검찰청
- Emblem of the Office. The Hangul characters on the emblem read Geomchal (Prosecution)

- Flag

Agency overview
- Formed: 1948
- Dissolved: 2 October 2026
- Jurisdiction: Government of South Korea
- Headquarters: Seocho, Seoul, South Korea
- Agency executives: Shim Woo-jung, Prosecutor General; Lee Jin-dong, Deputy Attorney General
- Parent department: Ministry of Justice
- Website: spo.go.kr

Korean name
- Hangul: 검찰청
- Hanja: 檢察廳
- RR: Geomchalcheong
- MR: Kŏmch'alch'ŏng

The Supreme Prosecutors' Office of the Republic of Korea (SPO; Korean: 검찰청) was a governmental prosecutor organization in South Korea run under the Ministry of Justice. As a national representative of prosecutors, the Office worked with the Supreme Court of Korea and below. It was abolished and replaced with the Serious Crimes Investigation Agency and the Prosecutors' Office under the Ministry of Justice, a division of powers and authority, on 2 October 2026.

== Organization ==
The SPO consisted of:

- Supreme Prosecutors' Office (대검찰청); executive agency that oversees the Korean Public Prosecutors' Office.
- High Prosecutors' Office (고등검찰청); composed of different District Prosecutors' Office (지방검찰청)
  - Seoul High Prosecutors' Office
    - Within Seoul: (Central District Prosecutors' Office; Eastern District Prosecutors' Office; Southern District Prosecutors' Office; Northern District Prosecutors' Office; Western District Prosecutors' Office)
    - District Prosecutors' Office of Chuncheon (District Office of Gangneung; District Office of Sokcho; District Office of Wonju; District Office of Yeongwol)
    - District Prosecutors' Office of Uijeongbu (District Office of Goyang; District Office of Namyangju)
    - District Prosecutors' Office of Incheon (District Office of Bucheon)
  - Suwon High Prosecutors' Office
    - District Prosecutors' Office of Suwon (District Office of Seongnam; District Office of Anyang; District Office of Ansan; District Office of Pyeongtaek; District Office of Yeoju)
  - Busan High Prosecutors' Office
    - District Prosecutors' Office of Busan (Eastern District Office; Western District Office)
    - District Prosecutors' Office of Ulsan
    - District Prosecutors' Office of Changwon (District Office of Masan; District Office of Jinju; District Office of Miryang; District Office of Tongyeong; District Office of Geochang)
  - Daegu High Prosecutors' Office
    - District Prosecutors' Office of Daegu (Western District Office; District Office of Andong; District Office of Gyeongju; District Office of Yeongdeok; Branch Office of Sangju; District Office of Uiseong; District Office of Pohang; District Office of Gimcheon)
  - Daejeon High Prosecutors' Office
    - District Prosecutors' Office of Daejeon (District Office of Hongseong; Branch Office of Gongju; District Office of Nonsan; District Office of Seosan; District Office of Cheonan)
    - District Prosecutors' Office of Cheongju (District Office of Chungju; Branch Office of Yeongdong; District Office of Jecheon)
  - Gwangju Public Prosecutors' Office
    - District Prosecutors' Office of Gwangju (District Office of Mokpo; District Office of Jangheung; Office of Suncheon; District Office of Haenam)
    - District Prosecutors' Office of Jeonju (District Office of Gunsan; District Office of Jeongeup; District Office of Namwon)
    - District Prosecutors' Office of Jeju

== Controversies ==
Since the latter half of the year 2010, the ruling political party in South Korea, the Grand National Party, had an uneasy stance with the budget issues and eventually generated severe disputes relating to corruptions and it contributed to criticisms against the Supreme Prosecutors' Office.

On 13 January 2012, the Seoul High Court cleared one of the bribery charges against Han Myeong-sook.

=== Prosecutor general ===
In 2011, a prosecutor general candidate, Han Sang-dae (한상대) was under investigation for his two incidents of false address registration and his participation of draft-dodging.

=== Civilian inspections ===
The SPO was alleged for hypocritical actions that it poorly managed the investigation of the illegal political-level inspections towards civilian institutions in 2010, however restricted an episode of MBC PD Note about this incident.

=== Right-wing political policing ===
The SPO under the Lee Myung-bak government had right-wing political characteristics. There was a series of allegations of sabotages against the current non-partisan mayor, Park Won-soon, by the SPO before the October 2011 election. Politicians who had supported former president Roh Moo-hyun also supported Park Won-soon under a unified intention to oppose the SPO. The SPO's investigations against Han Myeong-sook led to more controversy as the Seoul High Court found her innocent twice in the row. However, the SPO immediately appealed the decision, citing 11 different counts of evidence. Amongst them were direct statements by Han man-ho that he paid her 900,000,000 won in illegal fund money, Han Myeong-sook's siblings usage 100,000,000 won checks, and 240,000,000 won in Mrs. Han's bank account that had a 'suspicious trail'. The SPO alleged that Han Myeong-sook's assistant was taking the fall to cover for her illegal activities.

=== Sexual favors ===
In November 2012, it was alleged a 30-year-old trainee prosecutor, was found to have performed sexual acts in the office with the suspect in her forties while questioning her over an alleged theft and other charges earlier that month. According to inspectors at the SPO four days later, he took the woman to a nearby motel where they had sex. Jae-mong Jeon, the junior prosecutor, also a patent attorney and a graduate of Seoul National University and Hanyang Law School, claimed that the sex was consensual, according to investigators. The incident resulted in a strong reprimand from the president and prompt resignation of the Chief Prosecutor.

=== G20 summit poster incident ===
There was an incident where a university instructor, Park Jeong-su, vandalized a G-20 promotional poster by drawing a rat before the 2010 G-20 Seoul summit. His prosecution by the SPO exposed concerns that the SPO was politically leaned to serve the Lee Myung-bak government.

=== Impact ===
Baek Hye-ryun (백혜련), the female district attorney of the Daegu District Public Prosecutor's Office, voluntarily resigned on 21 November 2011 as the SPO cannot officially maintain its political neutrality under the Lee Myung-bak government.

The former chief secretary to late President Roh Moo-hyun, Moon Jae-in suggested that the SPO's resistance against reformations during the previous Participation Government, in which it also succeeded as the spearhead of the right-wing Lee Myung-bak government, eventually contributed to the unjust investigations against Roh in 2009.

=== Abuse of citizens ===
On 26 October 2011, the Seoul Central District Court appealed against the SPO for continuing an abusive investigation of a child sex abuse case; demanded the government to compensate the family members of the case in question.

=== Yoon Seok-yeol's resignation ===
Yoon Suk-yeol, who was Moon Jae-in the government's second attorney general against major criminal investigation office of the promotion and resigned. He received public attention due to conflicts with the Ministry of Justice, disciplinary action against suspension of work and the court's decision to reject suspension of work. He topped the presidential survey since his resignation.

=== Reputation ===
According to a survey conducted in 2009, 47.1% of South Koreans disapproved of the Supreme Prosecutors' Office and the credibility was scored low at 4 out of 10. There has been no new survey since. Overall general consensus amongst the Korean media rated the Prosecutors' Office of the Republic of Korea as having very low credibility.

=== Reform and abolition proposals ===
The power of the prosecutor's office was subject to political debate and reform efforts in South Korea. Critics raised concerns about scandals involving prosecutors and the relationship between the prosecution service and large business conglomerates. During the presidency of Moon Jae-in, the government pursued prosecutorial reforms aimed at redistributing some investigative authority to the police and establishing a separate body to investigate high-level corruption.

Implementation of the reforms became politically contentious following the appointment of Justice Minister Cho Kuk in 2019. Cho, who had been tasked with overseeing prosecutorial reform, became the subject of investigations by prosecutors into allegations involving members of his family. Amid the controversy, Cho resigned six weeks after taking office. The reforms subsequently became a point of dispute between the Democratic Party and conservative political groups that supported the prosecution service.

In January 2020, Choo Mi-ae became Minister of Justice and continued efforts to advance the reform agenda through the legislature.

On 26 September 2025, the National Assembly passed amendments to the Government Organization Act providing for the dissolution of the prosecution service and the Supreme Prosecutors' Office in September 2026. Under the legislation, prosecutorial and investigative functions are to be separated between two newly established agencies: the Serious Crimes Investigation Agency, responsible for felony investigations, and the Prosecution Office under the Ministry of Justice, responsible for indictments. Prosecutors in the new prosecution office are not permitted to initiate criminal investigations independently.

The prosecution service had operated as an independent institution since the enactment of the Prosecutors' Office Act in 1948. A one-year transition period was established to transfer personnel, responsibilities and authority to the successor agencies. Supporters of the reform argued that separating investigative and prosecutorial powers would reduce the concentration of authority within a single institution, while opponents raised concerns regarding the constitutionality of the legislation and its potential effects on criminal justice administration.

== See also ==
- Prosecutor General of South Korea
- Ministry of Justice (South Korea)
- Central Public Prosecutors Office of North Korea
