= Kim Chun-yon =

South Korean politician (1895–1971)

- 김준연
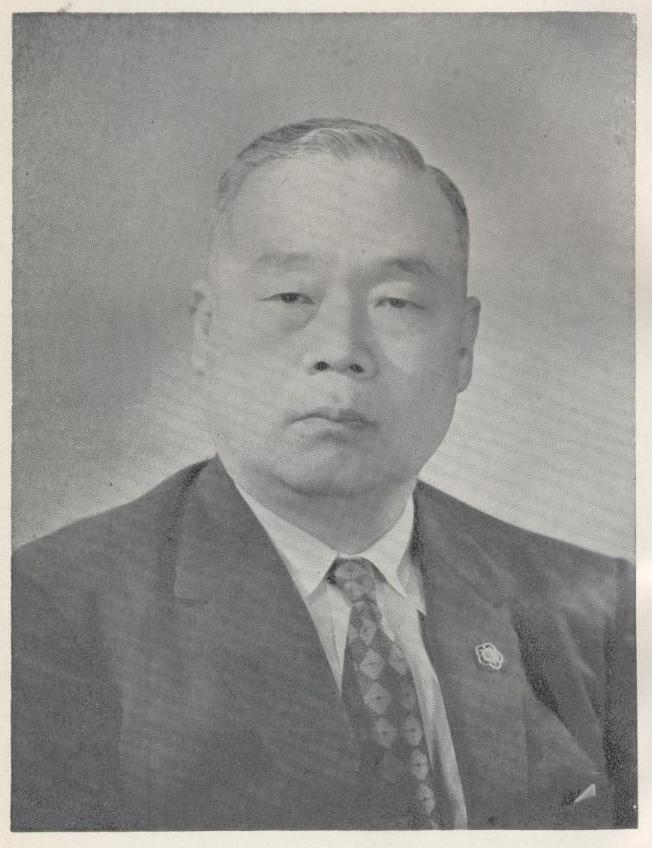

4th Minister of Justice
- In office November 23, 1950 – May 6, 1951
- President: Syngman Rhee
- Preceded by: Lee Woo-ik
- Succeeded by: Cho Chin-man

Personal details
- Born: 1895 Yeongam, South Jeolla Province, Joseon
- Died: 1971 (aged 75–76)

Korean name
- Hangul: 김준연
- Hanja: 金俊淵
- RR: Gim Junyeon
- MR: Kim Chunyŏn

Kim Chun-yon (Korean: 김준연; Hanja: 金俊淵; 1895–1971) was a South Korean politician and journalist who served as the fourth minister of justice for South Korea from November 23, 1950, to May 6, 1951.

== Biography ==
Kim was born in 1895 during the 32nd year of King Gojong's reign in Yeongam, South Jeolla Province, Joseon. In 1917, he went to Japan to study abroad and graduated from Tokyo Imperial University in 1920. Kim then went to Germany where he studied law and politics at the University of Berlin from 1922 to 1924. In 1925, he worked for The Chosun Ilbo as a foreign correspondent in Moscow. Upon returning to Korea in 1926, he participated in the Korean independence movement by joining Singanhoe. He also worked as a lecturer at Boseong College and editor-in-chief for The Dong-A Ilbo.

In 1928, Kim was arrested by Japanese authorities for his involvement with the Korean Communist Party and sentenced to seven years in prison. He rejoined The Dong-A Ilbo as editor-in-chief in 1934 after his release. In 1936, he resigned his post in the aftermath of the Japanese flag erasure incident. Following Korean's liberation, he joined the Korean Democratic Party. On May 10, 1948, he won an uncontested election to the first National Assembly of South Korea as a representative of Yeongam County where he served until he lost his bid for re-election in 1950.

From November 12, 1950, to May 6, 1951, he served as minister of justice. He was then elected to the National Assembly in 1954. He left the Democratic Party and formed the Unification Party in 1957. He was then re-elected to the National Assembly in 1958 and 1960. In 1963, he was elected as a member of the Liberty Democratic Party. He was also the People's Party candidate for 1967 presidential election. He died in 1971.

Legal offices
Preceded by Lee Woo-ik	Minister of Justice; 1950–1951	Succeeded by Cho Chin-man
