= Prosecutor General of South Korea =

Head of South Korean prosecution service

- 검찰총장
- Emblem of the Prosecution Service of South Korea

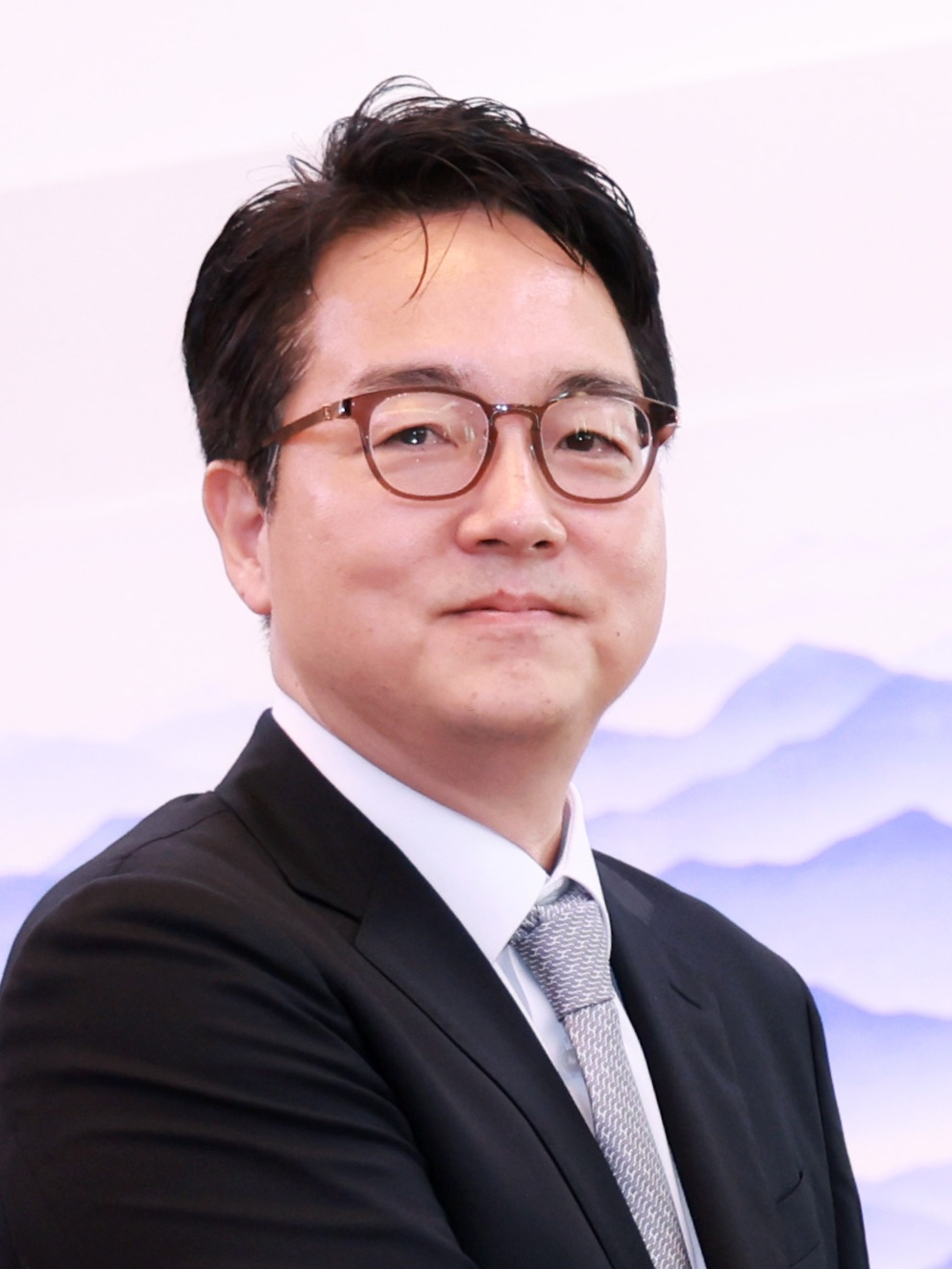
- Incumbent; Shim Woo-jung since 16 September 2024
- Supreme Prosecutors' Office
- Seat: Seocho, Seoul
- Appointer: President
- Term length: Two years, non renewable
- Constituting instrument: Prosecutors' Office Act
- Formation: 31 October 1948; 78 years ago
- First holder: Gwon Seung-ryeol
- Website: www.spo.go.kr/site/spo/main.do

The Prosecutor General of South Korea (Korean: 검찰총장; Hanja: 檢察總長; RR: Geomchal chongjang) is the head of the Supreme Prosecutors' Office of the Republic of Korea.

== Duties ==
The duties are mentioned under the "Prosecutors' Office Act" (Korean: 검찰청법) enacted since 10 March 1993.

Since 31 December 1988, the term is set to two years and cannot be extended according to article 12(3) of the Act. In case of any issues i.e. sick, on leave, resignation and/or death, the assistant prosecutor general will take the position as the interim.

== List of prosecutors general ==
Notes: Italics are interims.

| No. | Name | Term |
|---|---|---|
| 1 | Gwon Seung-ryeol | 31 October 1948 – 5 June 1949 |
| 2 | Kim Ik-jin | 6 June 1949 – 21 June 1950 |
| 3 | Seo Sang-hwan | 22 June 1950 – 5 March 1952 |
| 4 | Han Gyeok-man | 14 March 1952 – 29 September 1955 |
| 5 | Min Bok-gi | 30 September 1955 – 5 July 1956 |
| 6 | Jeong Sun-seok | 6 July 1956 – 10 March 1958 |
| 7 | Park Seung-jun | 11 March 1958 – 4 May 1960 |
| 8 | Lee Tae-hui | 5 May 1960 – 27 May 1961 |
| 9 | Jang Yeong-sun | 28 May 1961 – 31 January 1963 |
| 10 | Jeong Chang-un | 1 February 1963 – 6 December 1963 |
| 11 | Shin Jik-su | 7 December 1963 – 3 June 1971 |
| 12 | Lee Bong-seong | 5 June 1971 – 2 December 1973 |
| 13 | Kim Chi-yeol | 3 December 1973 – 18 December 1975 |
| 14 | Lee Seon-jung | 19 December 1975 – 4 December 1976 |
| 15 | Oh Tak-geun | 7 December 1976 – 21 May 1980 |
| 16 | Kim Jong-gyeong | 28 May 1980 – 9 March 1981 |
| 17 | Heo Hyeong-gu | 10 March 1981 – 15 December 1981 |
| 18 | Jeong Chi-geun | 16 December 1981 – 21 May 1982 |
| 19 | Kim Seok-hwi | 24 May 1982 – 18 February 1985 |
| 20 | Seo Dong-kown | 21 February 1985 – 26 May 1987 |
| 21 | Lee Jong-nam | 27 May 1987 – 5 December 1988 |
| 22 | Kim Gi-chun | 6 December 1988 – 5 December 1990 |
| 23 | Jeong Gu-yeong | 6 December 1990 – 5 December 1992 |
| 24 | Kim Du-hui | 6 December 1992 – 7 March 1993 |
| 25 | Park Jong-cheol | 8 March 1993 – 13 September 1993 |
| 26 | Kim Do-eon | 16 September 1993 (Note: Acting from 13 September 1993 to 16 September 1993.) – 15 September 1995 |
| 27 | Kim Gi-su | 16 September 1995 – 6 August 1997 |
| 28 | Kim Tae-jeong | 7 August 1997 – 24 May 1999 |
| 29 | Park Sun-yong | 26 May 1999 – 25 May 2001 |
| 30 | Shin Seung-nam | 26 May 2001 – 15 January 2002 |
| 31 | Lee Myeong-jae | 17 January 2002 – 5 November 2002 |
| 32 | Kim Gak-yeong | 11 November 2002 – 10 March 2003 |
| 33 | Song Gwang-su | 3 April 2003 – 2 April 2005 |
| 34 | Kim Jong-bin | 4 April 2005 – 17 October 2005 |
| 35 | Jeong Sang-myeong | 24 November 2005 (Note: Acting from 17 October 2005 to 23 November 2005.) – 23 November 2007 |
| 36 | Im Chae-jin | 24 November 2007 – 5 June 2009 |
| - | Mun Seong-u | 5 June 2009 – 14 July 2009 |
| - | Han Myeong-gwan | 14 July 2009 – 19 July 2009 |
| - | Cha Dong-min | 19 July 2009 – 28 July 2009 |
| 37 | Kim Jun-gyu | 28 July 2009 – 4 July 2011 |
| - | Park Yong-seok | 5 July 2011 – 10 August 2011 |
| 38 | Han Sang-dae | 12 August 2011 – 30 November 2012 |
| - | Chae Dong-uk | 30 November 2012 – 4 December 2012 |
| - | Kim Jin-tae | 4 December 2012 – 3 April 2013 |
| 39 | Chae Dong-uk | 4 April 2013 – 30 September 2013 |
| - | Gil Tae-gi | 30 September 2013 – 2 December 2013 |
| 40 | Kim Jin-tae | 2 December 2013 – 1 December 2015 |
| 41 | Kim Su-nam | 2 December 2015 – 12 May 2017 |
| - | Kim Ju-hyeon | 12 May 2017 – 20 May 2017 |
| - | Bong Uk | 21 May 2017 – 25 July 2017 |
| 42 | Mun Mu-il | 25 July 2017 – 24 July 2019 |
| 43 | Yoon Suk Yeol | 25 July 2019 – 4 March 2021 |
| - | Jo Nam-gwan | 5 March 2021 – 31 May 2021 |
| 44 | Kim Oh-soo | 1 June 2021 – 6 May 2022 |
| 45 | Lee One-seok | 16 September 2022 – 15 September 2024 |
| 46 | Shim Woo-jung | 16 September 2024 – 4 July 2025 |

== See also ==
- Supreme Prosecutors' Office of the Republic of Korea
