= Lee Woo-ik =

South Korean jurist (1890–1982)

- 이우익
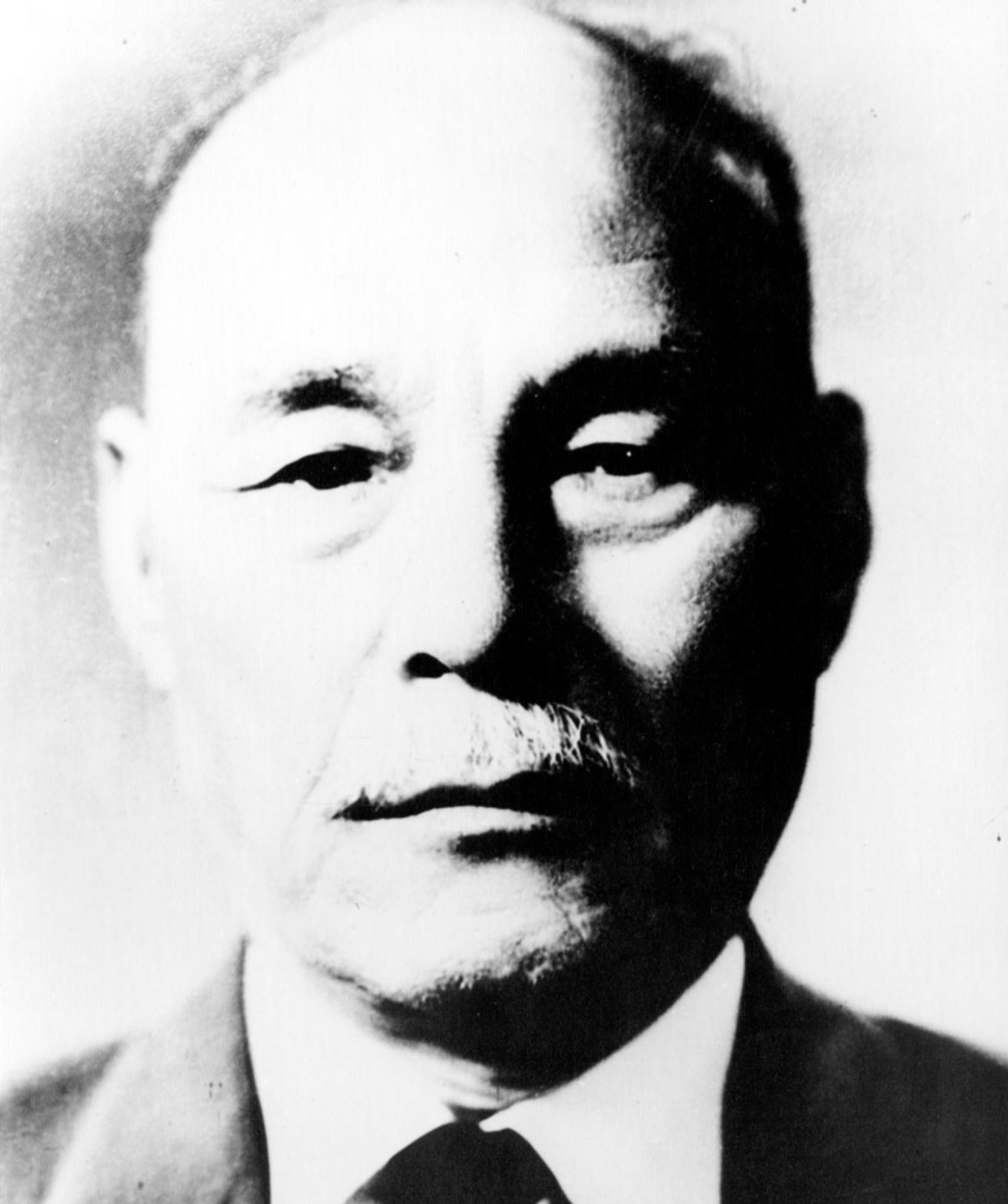
- Lee in 1950

3rd Minister of Justice
- In office May 22, 1950 – November 22, 1950
- President: Syngman Rhee
- Preceded by: Gwon Seung-ryeol
- Succeeded by: Kim Chun-yon

Personal details
- Born: 1890 Chilgok, Gyeongsang Province, Joseon
- Died: November 1982 (aged 91–92) Chilgok, North Gyeongsang Province, South Korea

Korean name
- Hangul: 이우익
- Hanja: 李愚益
- RR: I Uik
- MR: I Uik

Lee Woo-ik (Korean: 이우익; Hanja: 李愚益; 1890 – November 1982) was a South Korean politician and lawyer who served as the third minister of justice for South Korea from May 22, 1950, to November 22, 1950.

== Biography ==
Lee was born in 1890 during the 27th year of King Gojong's reign in Shinri, Jicheon-myeon, Chilgok County, North Gyeongsang Province. During the spring of 1908, Lee moved to Seoul where he attended Gyeongseong Law School. After graduating in 1912, he passed the judge's examination in 1913. In 1914, he became a judge and was appointed to the Miryang Branch of the Daegu District Court. He was appointed to the position of prosecutor in 1915 before returning to the Daegu District Court as a judge in 1920. In 1921, he was appointed to the Daegu Appellate Court and joined the Pyongyang Appellate Court in 1926. In 1927, he left the court and returned to Daegu to open a law firm.

On November 9, 1947, Lee was named the first chief prosecutor for the Daegu High Prosecutors' Office. Lee was appointed the third minister of justice on May 22, 1950, and resigned on November 22, 1950. Following the retirement of Chief Justice Kim Byung-ro in 1957, President Syngman Rhee unsuccessfully sought to have Lee appointed the next chief justice.

Lee died February 1982 in Namgye-ri, Yakmok-myeon, Chilgok-gun.

Legal offices
Preceded by Gwon Seung-ryeol	Minister of Justice; 1950	Succeeded by Kim Chun-yon
