= Korea Correctional Service =

South Korean law enforcement agency

- 교정본부 (Korean)

Agency overview
- Formed: 1948; 78 years ago
- Jurisdiction: South Korea
- Headquarters: Building 1, Gwacheon Government Complex, Gwacheon, Gyeonggi
- Agency executive: Shin Yong-hae, Commissioner
- Parent agency: Ministry of Justice
- Website: corrections.go.kr

Korean name
- Hangul: 교정본부
- Hanja: 矯正本部
- RR: Gyojeong bonbu
- MR: Kyojŏng ponbu

The Korea Correctional Service (Korean: 교정본부) is an agency of the Ministry of Justice of South Korea responsible for correctional services.

The Korea Correctional Service is headquartered in Building 1 of the Government Complex-Gwacheon in Gwacheon, Gyeonggi, in the Seoul metropolitan area.

== History ==
The Korea Correctional Service was founded on 17 July 1948, a month before the formal inauguration of South Korea, and was reorganized into its current form in 2007.

In 2002, the agency introduced its mascot, Borami, an anthropomorphic bear based on the Korean foundational myth.

== Demographics ==
As of 2007, there were 2,431 women incarcerated in the South Korean prison system, making up 5.3% of all of the prison inmates; Bitna Kim, Jurg Gerber, and Yeonghee Kim of Sam Houston State University wrote that therefore "these incarcerated women have not been a matter of much popular or scholarly concern and interest in South Korea."

Female prisoners are held in 10 detention centers, one long-term prison for women, one juvenile correctional center, four correctional center branches, and a vocational training correctional center as of 2007. The number of females detained can be contributed to a study conducted by researchers Kim, Park, & Lee (2004) who stated, "A large proportion of incarcerated women in Korea were incarcerated for intimate partner homicide" (130). This interesting finding may be contributed to the country's patriarchal roots, which causes an imbalance of power based on gender. Women in South Korea are pressured to increase their societal value by any means necessary including cosmetic surgery and marrying someone that has a higher socioeconomic status. Because of this, the authors of this study wanted to test the general power-control theory, which focused on the differences between females engaging in prosocial and antisocial risk-taking behavior. The criteria for prosocial risk-taking behavior from females involved career paths such as doctors and police, while antisocial risk-taking included females involved in committing crimes. These researchers hypothesized that both prosocial and antisocial risk-taking groups would have been raised in less patriarchal families and were more likely to challenge gender roles, reject patriarchal beliefs, and have a high preference for engaging in risk-taking behavior. The results of their study found that females a part of the antisocial group were more likely to be raised in less patriarchal families, while prosocial females were more likely to be raised in patriarchal families. However, other studies show weak support for power-control theory.

As of 2005, prisoners who are members of the United States Forces Korea (U.S. military members convicted of serious crimes by local South Korean courts) are generally held at Cheonan Juvenile Correctional Institution in Cheonan. As per an agreement between the U.S. and South Korea, they are held one to a cell, separated from South Korean prisoners, given Western cuisine supplied by U.S. Forces Korea, and are not required to perform hard labor that is mandatory for South Korean prisoners.

== Centers ==
There are 11 pre-trial detention centers and 37 correctional centers; the latter includes one women's prison, one juvenile institution, one private prison, two centers for vocational training, and one open prison.

Pre-trial detention centers:

- Seoul Detention Center (Uiwang, Gyeonggi Province) - Opened in July 1967, it was the first pretrial detention center in South Korea. The Seoul Detention Center housed former President Park Geun-hye following her arrest in 2017. An execution chamber is located in the center, although no executions have been carried out in South Korea since the late 1990s.
- Chungju Detention Center
- Daegu Detention Center - a high-rise building
- Incheon Detention Center - a high-rise building
- Suwon Detention Center - a high-rise building
- Ulsan Detention Center - a high-rise building

Correctional centers:

- Cheongju Women's Correctional Institution (청주여자교도소) - the only long-term prison for women in South Korea; includes female vocational training
- Daegu Correctional Institution - includes female vocational training
- Hwaseong Correctional Institution
- Pohang Correctional Institution
- Somang Correctional Institution - private prison
- Yeoju Correctional Institution - includes female vocational training
- Gimcheon Juvenile Correctional Institution
