= Power-control theory of gender and delinquency =

In criminology, the power-control theory of gender and delinquency (abbreviated as the power-control theory) holds the gender distribution of delinquency is caused by stratification from gender relations within the family. The theory seeks to explain gender differences in the rates of delinquency by attributing them to the level of social/parental control practiced. The theory states that the class, gender, and type of family structure (e.g. egalitarian or patriarchal) will influence the severity of social/parental control practiced which will in turn set the "accepted norm" for the child/individual. This norm will in turn control the level of delinquency by the individual.

Power-control theory differs from other control theories that view crime as a cause of low social status (cited from book). This theory compares gender and parental control mechanisms in two different types of families; patriarchal and egalitarian to explain the differences in self-reported male and female misconduct. In patriarchal families, traditional gender roles were in practice, where the father would work outside the home, and the mother would be responsible for the child rearing. In egalitarian families, the household roles were shared equally between mothers and fathers.

The theory was originally posited by John Hagan and further developed by A. R. Gillis and John Simpson at the University of Toronto.

== Development ==
The power control theory was developed through a series of self-report surveys that was administered to high school students and their parents in suburban Toronto. Hagan and his colleagues contended that gender and the social class of the students' parents affected how much freedom these students had. For example, coming of age as they argued, was a more limiting experience than growing up as a male. Thereby, they found that the amount of power a parent had in the workplace was related to the control displayed in the household over their teenaged children. Moreover, parents who had the types of jobs where they must supervise the activities of subordinates also tended to be relatively tolerant of the trouble-making behaviour of their children, especially of their sons. This meant that teenaged boys are freer to deviate than teenaged girls. This study also found, focusing on relatively minor forms of deviance such as shoplifting and breaking street lights, that middle-class youth actually were freer to deviate than working-class youth.

== Limitations ==
Julian Tanner offers two interesting critical comments. Though the power control theory effectively explains common delinquency among ordinary youth, it does not explain violent and repetitive crime and, therefore, the power control theory cannot predict such behavior. In addition, the power control theory suggests that parents in egalitarian households are more likely to raise females as delinquent than a female growing up in a patriarchal family; however, UCR (uniform crime report) data shows that the opposite association exists and that the involvement in female labor force is actually related to lower levels of female delinquency. Also, after years of refining the power control theory, theorists have found the notion that mothers being more controlling over their daughters are more likely to be found in egalitarian families than patriarchal families, which is the opposite relationship the power control theory would likely predict.

When the theory was refined over the years, Singer and Levine (1988) found mixed support for the theory in their early attempts to test this theory. While mothers were seen to be more controlling over their daughters than their sons, the authors also found this to be more so with egalitarian than patriarchal families, which is a finding opposite to what power control theory would predict.

== Theory extended beyond family ==
The theory has been extended into adult social roles as well. Stratified behaviors typically associated with males, particularly those in authoritative positions, are now being seen more frequently in females attaining powerful roles. And like their male counterparts, their power is used to control those persons in subordinate roles, as indicated by the rise in reports of sexual harassment (cougar syndrome) and cronyism.

Despite the explanation of social roles, there has not been a feminist theory that is fully developed to explain for the uniqueness of female criminality. While males are reported to be more involved in every type of crime, females tend to be arrested for considerably minor property crimes. This is due to the idea that the character and level of female crime is not consistent with the traditional sociological explanations of crime. Gender socialization refers to the process by which individuals learn and internalize societal expectations associated with their assigned gender. This process significantly impacts various life aspects, including susceptibility to engaging in or becoming victims of criminal activities. Understanding the nexus between gender socialization and crime is crucial for developing effective prevention strategies and equitable justice systems.
