= Yun Po-sun =

President of South Korea from 1960 to 1962

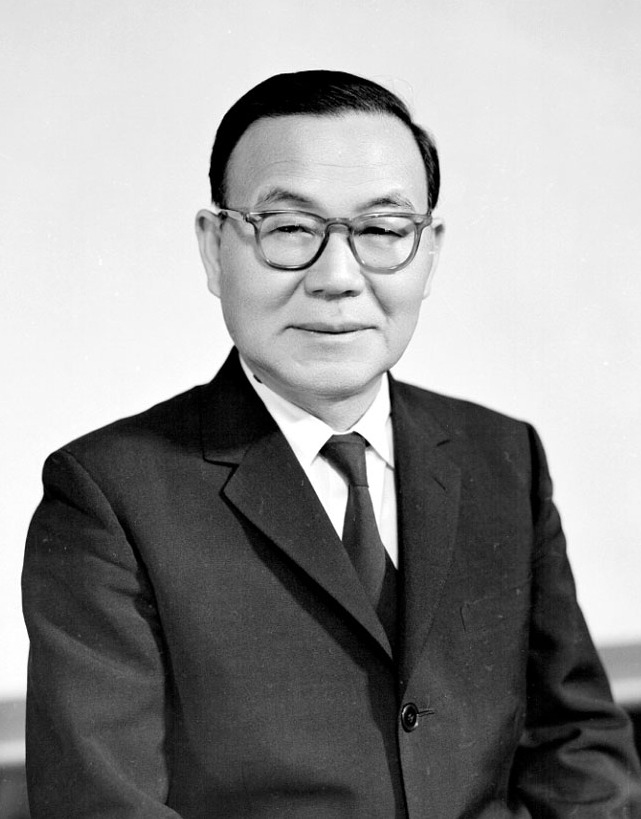
- Official portrait c. 1960

2nd President of South Korea
- In office 13 August 1960 – 24 March 1962
- Prime Minister: Ho Chong; Chang Myon; Chang Do-yong (acting) (Note: as Chief Cabinet Minister of the Supreme Council for National Reconstruction.); Song Yo-chan (acting)
- Vice President: Position abolished
- Leader: Park Chung Hee
- Preceded by: Syngman Rhee; Ho Chong (acting); Kwak Sang-hoon (acting); Ho Chong (acting); Baek Nak-jun (acting)
- Succeeded by: Park Chung Hee (acting); Park Chung Hee

2nd Mayor of Seoul
- In office 15 December 1948 – 5 June 1949
- President: Syngman Rhee
- Prime Minister: Lee Beom-seok
- Vice President: Yi Si-yeong
- Preceded by: Kim Hyong-min
- Succeeded by: Lee Ki-poong

Personal details
- Born: 26 August 1897 Asan County, South Chungcheong Province, Joseon
- Died: 18 July 1990 (aged 92) Jongno District, Seoul, South Korea
- Resting place: Yun Family Cemetery, Asan
- Party: Democratic (1955); New Democratic (1967)
- Spouse(s): Min Kyung-suk (m. 1915; died 1937) Gong Deok-gwi (m. 1948)
- Relations: Yun Chi-sung (uncle)
- Children: 4

Korean name
- Hangul: 윤보선
- Hanja: 尹潽善
- RR: Yun Boseon
- MR: Yun Posŏn

Art name
- Hangul: 해위
- Hanja: 海葦
- RR: Haewi
- MR: Haewi

Courtesy name
- Hangul: 경천
- Hanja: 敬天
- RR: Gyeongcheon
- MR: Kyŏngch'ŏn
Yun Po-sun's voice
Yun's inaugural address after being sworn into office
Recorded August 13, 1960
Yun Po-sun
Academic background
- Education: University of Edinburgh (MA)
- Doctoral advisor: V. Gordon Childe

Yun Po-sun (Korean: 윤보선, pronounced [junbosʌn] or [jun] [posʌn]; 26 August 1897 – 18 July 1990) was a South Korean politician and activist who served as the second president of South Korea from 1960 to 1962. He was the only president of the short-lived Second Republic of Korea, and served as little more than a figurehead due to its nature as a parliamentary system.

Having entered politics after World War II, Yun served as Secretary to Korea's Chief of Staff in 1947, and was Mayor of Seoul in 1948. He served as Commerce Minister for the newly liberated Korea from 1949 to 1950. In 1955, Yun helped establish the South Korean Democratic Party. He was forced to resign the presidency by Park Chung Hee as a result of the May 16 coup in 1961.

== Early life and education ==
Yun was born on August 26, 1897, in Asan, South Chungcheong Province. He was the eldest of nine children of Yun Chi-so, a businessman and Christian, and his wife Yi Beom-suk. He belonged to the Haepyeong Yun clan, whose members included the reformer Yun Chi-ho and the politician Yun Chi-yeong, who became minister of home affairs in 1948.

Yun attended Hanseong Higher Elementary School from 1907 and a Japanese school in Seoul from 1910. In 1913, he entered the medical school of Keio University in Japan, but he left after two semesters. In the summer of 1917, he went to Shanghai, where he lived for about four years with the independence activist Shin Gyu-sik, who gave him his art name, Haewi. On March 13, 1920, he became a member of the Provisional Assembly of the Provisional Government of the Republic of Korea. In 1921, at Syngman Rhee's direction, he went to Japan to raise funds for the independence movement.

In June 1921, on the advice of Shin Gyu-sik and Shin Ik-hee, Yun left for Britain. He studied archaeology at the University of Edinburgh from 1927, and received a Master of Arts degree in 1930. After traveling in Europe, he returned to Korea on March 16, 1932, after about 14 years abroad, and lived in seclusion during the remainder of Japanese rule.

== Early political career ==
After the liberation of Korea in 1945, Yun helped found the Korea Democratic Party. In October 1945, he became an adviser to the agricultural bureau of the United States Army Military Government and to the governor of Gyeonggi Province. In April 1947, he acquired the newspaper Minjung Ilbo and became its president. He stood for the 1948 Constitutional Assembly election in Asan, but was defeated. In August 1948, he became secretary-general to Syngman Rhee in Rhee's office as speaker of the National Assembly.

In December 1948, Rhee appointed Yun as the second mayor of Seoul. In 1949, he became minister of commerce and industry, a post he held for about a year. In 1950, he became president of the Korean Red Cross, and in 1952 he became president of the Korea–Britain Association. According to the Seoul Shinmun, while heading the Red Cross during the Korean War, he reported the National Defense Corps scandal to Rhee, who reacted angrily, and Yun then broke with Rhee and joined the opposition.

== Opposition leader ==
In May 1954, Yun won a seat for Jongno District in the 3rd National Assembly. He received more votes than the other twelve candidates combined. He opposed the 1954 constitutional amendment passed by the "rounding off" method, which allowed Rhee to seek further terms. In 1955, he helped found the opposition Democratic Party. He became chairman of the party's central committee in 1957, and in 1959 he was elected one of its supreme members. Together with Kim Do-yeon, he led the party's "old faction". He was re-elected to the National Assembly in 1958. In 1960, he headed the party's investigation team into the fraudulent presidential election of March 15.

== Presidency (1960–1962) ==
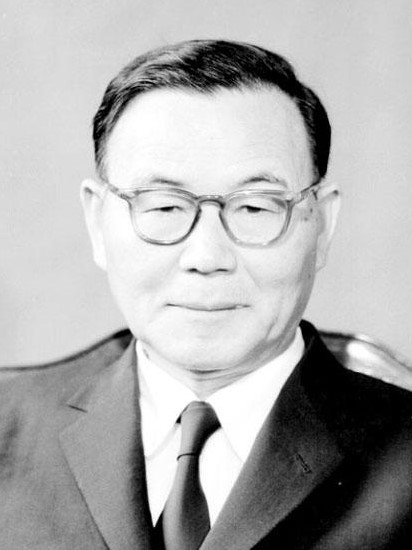
- Presidency of Yun Po-sun; August 13, 1960 – March 24, 1962
- Prime Minister: Ho Chong; Chang Myon; Chang Do-yong; Song Yo-chan
- Cabinet: Full list
- Party: Democratic
- Election: August 1960
- Seat: Seoul
- Constituency: Second Republic (1960–1961); SCNR (1961–1962)

Rhee's government was overthrown by the student-led April Revolution of 1960. On August 12, 1960, a joint session of the newly elected legislature elected Yun president, with 208 of the 259 votes cast, and he was sworn in the following day. He first nominated Kim Do-yeon, his ally in the old faction, as prime minister, but the nomination failed by three votes. He then nominated Chang Myon, a leader of the party's "new faction", who became prime minister. The two factions clashed over cabinet posts and government policy, and the conflict weakened the government. According to Encyclopædia Britannica, these internal rivalries rendered Yun's leadership ineffectual.

=== May 16 coup ===
On May 16, 1961, troops led by Major General Park Chung Hee seized power in Seoul. When Yun met Park that day, he reportedly said, "So it has come", and he later explained that he had meant that a long-feared scenario had come true. General Carter B. Magruder, the commander of United States forces in Korea, reported to Washington that the president did not want martial law declared or firm action taken to suppress the coup. According to the Seoul Shinmun, Yun refused Magruder's request to approve the use of troops against the coup, saying that South Korean forces could not shed each other's blood. Magruder also reported that Yun appeared to see the coup as an acceptable way of removing his political opponent, and that Yun criticized the corruption and ineffectiveness of Chang Myon's government.

Three days after the coup, Yun announced his resignation, but he then reversed his decision. Park persuaded him to stay in office under the military's Supreme Council for National Reconstruction. Yun clashed repeatedly with the military, and after twice withdrawing his resignation, he announced it on March 22, 1962.

== Opposition to Park Chung Hee ==
In the presidential election of October 1963, Yun ran as the candidate of the Civil Rule Party and lost to Park by about 157,000 votes. He afterwards described himself as the "spiritual president". He returned to the National Assembly in the 1963 legislative election. He denounced the 1965 treaty normalizing relations with Japan as treason, and resigned his seat after leaving his party. During the treaty debate, he also criticized United States policy towards Korea. He later led a succession of opposition parties, and in 1966 he became supreme chairman of the New Democratic Party. As the united opposition candidate in the presidential election of 1967, he lost to Park by about 1.16 million votes.

In 1969, Yun led the opposition to the constitutional amendment that allowed Park to seek a third term. He organized a petition campaign for constitutional revision in 1973. In 1974, he was tried in connection with the National Democratic Youth and Student League case under Emergency Measure No. 1, and prosecutors sought a 15-year sentence. In 1976, he signed a declaration calling for democracy with Kim Dae-jung and Ham Seok-heon, in what became known as the Myeongdong incident. Britannica records that he was twice convicted of instigating the overthrow of the government, and that he received suspended prison sentences. His home in Anguk-dong became a meeting place for opposition politicians, and a watchtower was built on a nearby building to monitor them.

== Later years ==
After Park's assassination in 1979, Yun took part in the YWCA incident, in which dissidents used a sham wedding as cover for a rally for democratic reform. He was tried for organizing the rally and again received a suspended sentence. He became senior adviser to the New Democratic Party and gradually withdrew from politics. During the "Seoul Spring" of 1980, he tried and failed to unite Kim Young-sam and Kim Dae-jung behind a single opposition candidate. He retired from politics in 1980.

In the 1980s, Yun served on an advisory committee to President Chun Doo-hwan, and he remained relatively silent about Chun's regime. In the 1987 presidential election, he supported Roh Tae-woo, which drew criticism from the pro-democracy movement. The Encyclopedia of Korean Culture attributes such choices to his style of politics, in which personal ties often decided his actions.

== Death and funeral ==
Yun was admitted to Seoul National University Hospital on March 30, 1990, and was discharged on July 18. He died of old age at his home in Anguk-dong, Seoul, on July 18, 1990, at the age of 92. The government considered holding a national funeral, but he was given a family funeral. President Roh Tae-woo did not attend the funeral, and the Kyunghyang Shinmun noted in 2015 that this was the only case of a sitting president missing a former president's funeral. Yun was buried in his family cemetery in Asan.

== Personal life ==
In 1915, Yun married a daughter of Min Yong-chol, and their daughter was born in December of that year. On January 6, 1949, while he was mayor of Seoul, he married Gong Deok-gwi, who became a women's rights and social activist. His son Yun Sang-gu kept vigil at his wake in 1990. Yun wrote two volumes of memoirs, The Thorny Path to Saving the Nation, published in 1967, and Days of Lonely Choices, published in 1991.

== Legacy ==
Yun's birthplace in Dunpo-myeon, Asan, which his father built in 1907, was designated a national folk cultural heritage on December 24, 1984. His family home in Anguk-dong, a large hanok that his father bought around 1910, was designated Historic Site No. 438 on January 29, 2002. In 2021, a plan by Asan city to put up a notice about the pro-Japanese activities of members of the Haepyeong Yun clan, including Yun's father, near his birthplace drew opposition from local residents. The village head argued that the notice could lead visitors to mistake Yun, who had taken part in the independence movement, for a collaborator.

== Electoral record ==
Year	Elections	Constituency	Political party	No. of votes	%	Results
1948	1st National Assembly General Election	Asan County (South Chungcheong)	Korea Democratic Party	7,069	14.17%	Defeated (4th)
1954	3rd National Assembly General Election	Jongno District A (Seoul)	Democratic Nationalist Party	9,485	32.35%	Won
1958	4th National Assembly General Election	Jongno District A (Seoul)	Democratic Party	22,780	62.80%	Won
1960	5th National Assembly General Election	Jongno District A (Seoul)	Democratic Party	31,924	81.85%	Won
1960	1960 Presidential Election	South Korea	Democratic Party	208	82.2%	Won
1963	1963 Presidential Election	South Korea	Civil Rule Party	4,546,614	45.09%	Defeated (2nd)
1963	6th National Assembly General Election	National (1st)	Civil Rule Party	1,870,976	20.1%	Elected
1967	1967 Presidential Election	South Korea	New Democratic Party	4,526,541	40.93%	Defeated (2nd)

== Honours ==
- South Korea
  - Grand Order of Mugunghwa

== See also ==
- Yun Chi-ho
- Yun Chi-oh
- Yun Chi-young
- Chang Myon
- Chang Chun-ha
- August 1960 South Korean presidential election
- 1963 South Korean presidential election
- 1967 South Korean presidential election

Political offices
Preceded by Syngman Rhee; Ho Chong (Acting); Kwak Sang-hoon (Acting); Ho Chong (Acting); Baek Nak-jun (Acting)	President of South Korea; 13 August 1960–24 March 1962	Succeeded by Park Chung Hee (Acting); Park Chung Hee
Preceded by Kim Hyung-min	Mayor of Seoul; 15 December 1948–5 June 1949	Succeeded by Lee Ki-poong
Preceded by Lim Young-sin	Commerce Minister of South Korea; 6 June 1949–9 May 1950	Succeeded by Kim Hoon
National Assembly of the Republic of Korea
Preceded by Park Soon-cheon	National Assembly of Jongno District A (Seoul); 31 May 1954–12 August 1960	Succeeded by Jeon Jin-han
Preceded by	National Assembly of National (1st, Civil Rule Party); 17 December 1963–5 August 1965	Succeeded by
Party political offices
Preceded by Kim Byung-ro	President of the Civil Rule Party; 12 September 1963–11 May 1965	Succeeded by Office abolished
Preceded by Chough Pyung-ok	Democratic Party nominee for President of South Korea; 1960	Succeeded by Himself (Civil Rule Party nominee for President South Korea)
Preceded by Himself (Democratic Party nominee for President South Korea)	Civil Rule Party nominee for President of South Korea; 1963	Succeeded by Himself (New Democratic Party nominee for President South Korea)
Preceded by Himself (Civil Rule Party nominee for President South Korea)	New Democratic Party nominee for President of South Korea; 1967	Succeeded by Kim Dae-jung
