= Ministry of Justice (South Korea) =

Government ministry of South Korea

- 법무부
- Logo of the Ministry of Justice

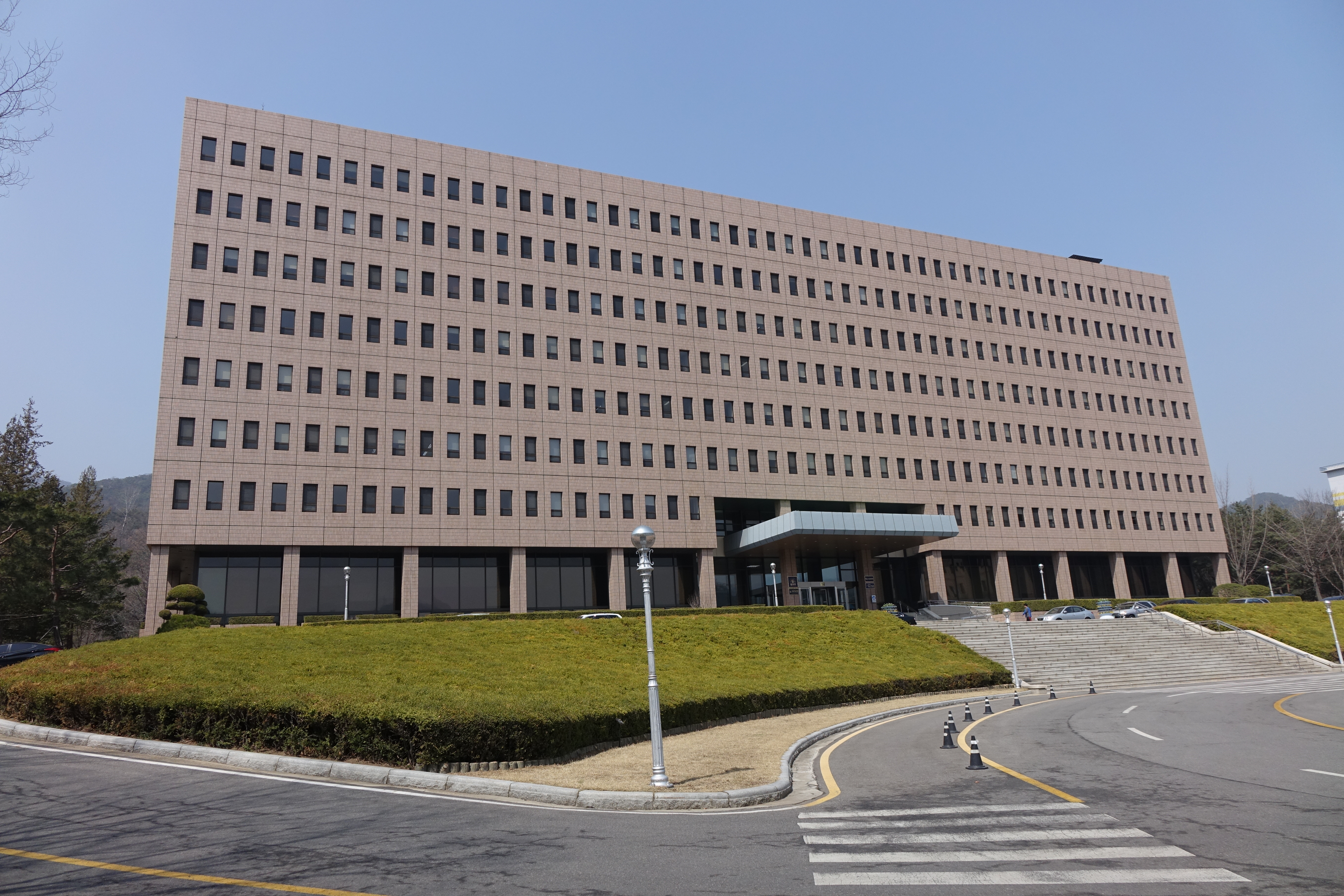
- Ministry of Justice headquarters in Gwacheon

Agency overview
- Formed: July 17, 1948; 78 years ago
- Jurisdiction: Government of South Korea
- Headquarters: Building 1, Gwacheon Government Complex, 47, Gwanmun-ro, Gwacheon, Gyeonggi Province, South Korea
- Minister responsible: Vacant
- Deputy Minister responsible: Kim Seok-woo
- Child agency: Supreme Prosecutors' Office of the Republic of Korea
- Website: www.moj.go.kr

Korean name
- Hangul: 법무부
- Hanja: 法務部
- RR: Beommubu
- MR: Pŏmmubu

The Ministry of Justice (MOJ; Korean: 법무부) is a cabinet-level ministry of the Government of South Korea that oversees the justice and legal affairs, protection of human rights, crime prevention and immigration control. It is headed by the minister of justice. The ministry contains organization and agency such as Supreme Prosecutors' Office of the Republic of Korea and Korea Correctional Service. It is headquartered in Building 1 of the Gwacheon Government Complex in Gwacheon, Gyeonggi Province, South Korea. Established on July 17, 1948, the Ministry of Justice is the only ministry whose name has never been changed or altered in the history of the Republic of Korea.

== Organization ==
According to the Decree on the Organization of Ministry of Justice and Institutions under its Jurisdiction, MOJ comprises the General Service Division, Legal Affairs Office, Criminal Affairs Bureau, Crime Prevention Policy Bureau, Human Rights Bureau, Korea Correctional Service, and Korea Immigration Service.

=== Leadership offices ===
- Minister
  - Inspector General
  - Spokesperson
  - Office of Policy and Planning
  - Policy Advisor to the Minister
- Vice Minister
  - General Services Division

=== Bureaus and services ===
- Planning & Coordination Bureau
- Legal Affairs Bureau
- Criminal Affairs Bureau
- Crime Prevention Policy Bureau
- Human Rights Bureau
- Korea Correctional Service
- Korea Immigration Service

== Logo ==
1949-2001

2001~2016

2016~present

== Child agency ==
- Supreme Prosecutors' Office of the Republic of Korea

== See also ==
- Ministry of justice
- Politics of South Korea
