= Chi Ch'ŏngch'ŏn =

South Korean politician (1888–1957)

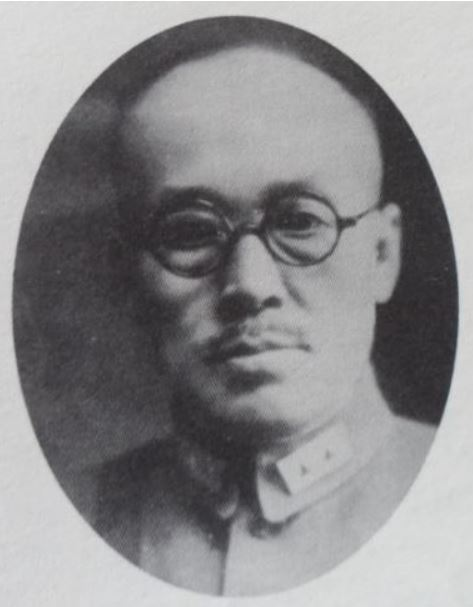
- Chi Ch'ŏngch'ŏn in 1940

Member of the National Assembly
- In office 31 May 1948 – 30 May 1954

Personal details
- Born: 25 January 1888
- Died: 15 January 1957 (aged 68) Seoul, South Korea
- Party: Korea Nationalist Party; Democratic Nationalist Party; Liberal Party
- Education: Imperial Japanese Army Academy
- Awards: Order of Merit for National Foundation

Korean name
- Hangul: 지청천
- Hanja: 池靑天
- RR: Ji Cheongcheon
- MR: Chi Ch'ŏngch'ŏn

Birth name
- Hangul: 지석규
- Hanja: 池錫奎
- RR: Ji Seokgyu
- MR: Chi Sŏkkyu

Other name
- Hangul: 이청천
- Hanja: 李靑天
- RR: I Cheongcheon
- MR: I Ch'ŏngch'ŏn

Military service
- Rank: Lieutenant General

Chi Ch'ŏngch'ŏn (Korean: 지청천; Hanja: 池靑天; 25 January 1888 – 15 January 1957), also known as Yi Ch'ŏngch'ŏn (이청천; 李靑天), was a Korean independence activist during the period of Japanese rule (1910–1945). He later became a South Korean politician. His name was originally Chi Sŏkkyu, but he took the nom de guerre Chi Ch'ŏngch'ŏn, meaning "Lake and Blue Sky", while leading Korean guerrilla forces against the Japanese. To hide his identity from Japanese forces while conducting military independence activities, he also used the names Chi Taehyŏng, Chi Subong, and Chi Ŭlgyu. His pen name was Paeksan, meaning White (Bright, Clear, Snowy) Mountain.

He was a 1914 graduate of the Imperial Japanese Army Academy; however, he defected to the Korean guerrilla forces in 1919, bringing with him knowledge of modern military techniques from his experience as a lieutenant in the Imperial Japanese Army. His skills were appreciated by the Korean guerrilla forces, who made him the superintendent of the Sinheung Military Academy, where new leaders of the Korean forces were trained.

In 1940, he became the commander-in-chief of the Korean Liberation Army, sponsored by the Chinese Nationalists. During the Second World War, he invited General Hong Sa-ik, the highest ranking Korean officer in the Imperial Japanese Army, to defect and join the Korean Liberation Army, but the invitation was declined.

Following Korea's liberation, he served as a member of the South Korea's National Assembly. He died in 1957, and was posthumously honored by the government of South Korea with the Order of Independence Merit for National Foundation in 1962.

== Biography ==
=== Early life ===
==== Birth and ancestry ====
Chi Ch'ŏngch'ŏn was born as the youngest son of his father, Chi Chaesŏn (池在善), and his mother, who was of the Gyeongju Lee clan, at 30 Samcheong-dong, Jongno District, Seoul. His hometown was Chungju, his childhood name was Subong, and his official name was Seokgyu. His father, Chi Chaesŏn, is the 31st generation descendant of Chigyŏng (池鏡), the founder of the Chungju Ji clan. He is a descendant of Chi Yonggi (池湧奇), who served as a scholar-chanchanseongsa of Goryeo. His family was one that produced military officers such as Chi Kyech'oe (池繼催) who suppressed the rebellion of Yi Kwal (李适) in the mid-Joseon Dynasty and died heroically while fighting against Qing soldiers at Sin'gye (新溪) during the Byeongjahoran.

The late 1880s, around the time Chi Ch'ŏngch'ŏn was born, was a time when the fate of the country was very precarious, like a candle in the wind, as the invasion of Western powers and Japanese imperialism became more blatant. While the armies of world powers, including Japan, the Qing Dynasty, the United States, the United Kingdom, and Russia, were constantly strengthening their efforts to invade Joseon, the British illegal occupation of Geomun-do occurred in 1885. Domestically, it was also a time when the confrontational relationship between the enlightenment faction, which was the main force behind the Kapsin Coup, which wanted to dismantle feudal society and achieve enlightenment by accepting Western civilization, and the anti-foreign forces and feudal forces that wanted to absolutely repel the invasion of foreign powers, became acute. . In 1882, Heungseon Daewongun, the leader of the anti-foreign forces movement, was kidnapped by Qing soldiers and imprisoned in Baoding which is in Hebei Province. Additionally, socially, it was a time when the weakening of national defense was exposed as the Imo Incident broke out due to corruption within the military along with the dissolution of feudal society.

==== Childhood ====
When he was 5 years old, his father died of intestinal paralysis, and he was raised by a single mother. Chi's mother in raising never spoiled him despite him being her only son. She sometimes played the role of mother and father, and even in difficult economic conditions without a head of the family, she educated him with all her heart focusing on the three organs: intelligence, virtue, and body.

=== Entering the Military Academy ===
He graduated from Pai Chai Academy in 1906 at the end of the Joseon Dynasty. In 1908, he entered the Military Academy of the Korean Empire. At that time, the Military Academy of the Korean Empire had narrowly escaped closure due to the disbandment of the military in the summer of 1907 and continued to exist in a reduced form. Therefore, joining the academy was very difficult at the time and required the assurance or recommendation of an influential person. Chi was narrowly able to enter the academy thanks to his mother's help to Lady Eom through a family member. However, the following year, in August 1909, during his second year of study, the military was abolished due to pressure from the Resident-General, and at the same time, the Military Academy was also closed down. At this time, the Japanese side decided to use their generosity to send about 50 first- and second-year cadets to study at the Tokyo Army Central Youth School in Japan. Accordingly, Chi goes on a study abroad trip to Japan with his classmates and juniors. Until this time, he used his real name (Chi Dae-hyeong). When Korea and Japan were annexed while studying abroad, he was transferred to the infantry department of the Imperial Japanese Army Academy and graduated as a member of the 26th class in 1914. After being promoted to lieutenant, he went into exile in Manchuria in 1919, became the head of the Sinhŭng Military Academy, and devoted himself to training executives for the independence army. It is said that during his exile at this time, he took with him the Japanese army's military manual (a type of tactical manual) and military maps. He was the only person in the independence army to graduate from a regular military academy, and Chi's value must have been very important to the independence army.

=== Marriage Anecdote ===
Afterwards, Chi married Yun Yongja (尹容慈), a woman from the Papyeong Yun family, according to his mother's orders. Chi, after drinking Haphwanju with his new wife, said this at the meeting with his wife that night.

I took you as my wife according to my mother's command, but I have already made up my mind and am not able to enjoy a comfortable life with my wife. I have already decided to take the path of a soldier and firmly protect my country and people from danger, so I don't know when I will die. So, what I want from you is that if you agree with me, you will not hesitate to go through hardships to take care of my old mother in my place, and if you bear offspring, you will educate them well. If you think this is an unreasonable request from me, you don't have to marry me. What do you think? Please be clear with me what you think.

Even though it was an old-fashioned arranged marriage, it was a remark that was difficult for a dreamy, beautiful 18-year-old bride to hear from her husband on the first day of her wedding. However, Yongja Yun had no choice but to quietly nod without realizing it.

=== Anecdote about Name Change ===
He was not afraid of dying, but believed that since dying without accomplishing what he wanted would be so vain, he would change his name to avoid getting caught.

So, instead of the existing name Seok-gyu, he took the new name Ch'ŏngch'ŏn, and his surname Chi was uncommon and easily heard by others, so he took his mother's surname (Lee). From this time on, Kim Gwang-seo (金光瑞) also changed his name to Eungcheon (應天). It is also said that when he was caught by the police of the Japanese Government General of Korea while crossing Manchuria by train, the name he blurted out was 'Yi Ch'ŏngch'ŏn.'

Later, Chi Ch'ŏngch'ŏn's daughter and independence activist Chi Pokyŏng (池復榮) recalled:

This happened when the general was an instructor at Sinhŭng Military Academy in 1919. While inspecting the students lined up one by one, the general discovered that one student had not buttoned his uniform. The general immediately asked the reason. The embarrassed student replied, "I forgot the button." After examining the uniform, the general noticed that the buttons were missing. The general harshly reprimanded the student, saying, "You didnt forget, you lost it."

"You can't even tell the difference between forgotten and lost? Soldiers fighting for their country's independence must have the right thoughts, and right thoughts come from the right language. How can a soldier who doesn't even know the language of his country find his country?"

In front of the general who ordered him to immediately drop out of school, the student was able to avoid the crisis after repeatedly pleading for an opportunity to dedicate himself to the independence of his country.

=== Independence Activism ===
==== Independence Army ====
In 1920, Chi Ch'ŏngch'ŏn was in the Provisional Government in Shanghai and moved over to the Manchurian Military Government, an affiliate organization of the Provisional Government. After receiving an invitation, he moved to the Western Military Government and took office as an executive in the Western Military Government. However, after the Battle of Cheongsanri, to avoid large-scale retaliation against Koreans by the Japanese army, he closed the Sinhŭng Military Academy and led his troops to Gando, where he organized the Korean Independence Corps with Seo Il, Hong Beom-do, Kim Kyu-sik, and Kim Chwajin. After the Free City Incident in June 1921, he moved to Irkutsk, where he formed the Koryo Revolutionary Army (August 1921) with Oh Hamuk and others. → It is a separate organization from the Goryeo Revolutionary Army (May 1923), located in Jilin Province, founded by Kim Kyu-sik and Lee Beom-seok. In October of the same year, he took office as principal of the Goryeo Revolutionary Military Academy. He was arrested around April 1922 due to a conflict between the educational policy of the military academy and the regulations of the Soviet authorities, but was released through the efforts of the Provisional Government in July.

He organized the Righteous Government with Yang Gi-tak, Oh Dong-jin, and later organized the newly integrated Innovation Council. In July 1930, after Kim Chwajin was assassinated, he participated in the founding of the Korean Independence Party (not the same one as Kim Ku's party), and separately created the Korean Independence Army and took office as the commander-in-chief of the independence army.

In Manchuria, they joined forces with the Chinese Tiger Army and conducted joint Korean-Chinese operations (Daejeonjaryeong, Battle of Ssangseongbo), but around May and June 1933, Chi Ch'ŏngch'ŏn and Lee Beom-seok led about 100 men and crossed to mainland China. He joined Kim Ku's faction in late 1933, but in 1934, Chi Ch'ŏngch'ŏn left the party and founded the New Korea Independence Party and went out separately.

In 1935, he participated in the National Revolutionary Party of Kim Won-bong and Kim Kyu-sik. However, after conflict with Kim Won-bong, he rebelled against Kim Won-bong's policy of appeasing and embracing left-wing careerists, so he left the party in April 1937 and founded the Joseon Revolutionary Party.

==== Korean Liberation Army ====
In the aftermath of the Second Sino-Japanese War in 1940, he followed the Provisional Government to Chongqing, attended the establishment ceremony of the Liberation Army in September of that year, and was appointed commander-in-chief of the Liberation Army to carry out the anti-Japanese war. Afterwards, he approved the proposal to dispatch the liberation army to India. In 1942, the Joseon Volunteer Corps led by Kim Won-bong was incorporated into the 1st Zone of the Liberation Army, and Kim Won-bong became the deputy commander of the Liberation Army and the commander of the 1st Zone, but acted independently, and the 1st, 2nd, and 3rd Zones of the Liberation Army also worked independently, each expanding the power of their own faction. Because they focused only on the military, Chi Ch'ŏngch'ŏn was the nominal commander, but had difficulty leading them.

In 1944, after he received a report from Chang Chun-ha, who had served in the Chinese army and then defected to the Liberation army, that Kim Won-bong was using a trick to encourage distrust of the Provisional Government of the Republic of Korea and the Liberation Army among Koreans who had served in the Japanese army, he personally inspected the Liberation army.

As the tyranny of some members of the Liberation Army continued, Kim Won-bong tried to take advantage of it. Distrust of the Provisional Government and the Liberation Army was exerted on units from the Japanese military. On October 7, 1945, Chongqing's Liberation army commander Li Ch'ŏngch'ŏn came to Shanghai, but the Japanese military units refused to inspect Commander Yi Ch'ŏngch'ŏn. Chang Chun-ha and others began discussing this issue by personally visiting a certain officer among them. Later, Jang Jun-ha said of him, 'Discussions began, but in reality, it was a conciliation operation. Chang Chun-ha and others reported Kim Won-bong's plan to Yi Ch'ŏngch'ŏn. On the other hand, he also informed the deserters from the Japanese army and gave them information on Hwang Mo and Lee So-min, the people in charge who acted as their agents, to discredit them. The persuasion was effective and Yi Ch'ŏngch'ŏn was inspected in person.

In April 1946, the following year after Liberation in 1945, he returned to Korea as an individual and hoped to rebuild the Liberation Army, but was unable to do so due to opposition from the U.S. military government and founded the Daedong Youth Corps.

=== Return to homeland and after ===
==== After liberation ====
He returned to Korea through Gimpo Airport on April 22, 1946. On his return to Korea, Syngman Rhee, Kim Ku, Kim Kyu-sik, Franziska Donner, and Lee Beom-seok personally came to meet him.

When Chi returned to Korea, Syngman Rhee recommended him to form a youth group. In September 1946, Chi integrated 26 youth organizations into the Daedong Youth Group. He expanded and reorganized the Daedong Youth Group, a right-wing youth group, and took office as its leader. When Chi returned to Korea, Syngman Rhee absorbed Jokcheong into the Daedong Youth Group centered around him. Afterwards, Chi served as the supreme member of the National Association for the Promotion of Independence and the president of the Korea-China Association.

From January 1948, when the theory of government establishment became divided between the theory of inter-Korean negotiations and the establishment of an independent government, he supported the theory of establishing an independent government, resigned from the Provisional Government and joined the National Association for the Promotion of Independence.

In March 1948, during the conflict between the left and the right, Kim Du-han, who was sentenced to death by the US military government for violating the proclamation, Chi along with Lee Beom-seok petitioned John Hodge for a commutation of the sentence, and launched a movement to save the life of Kim. In April 1948, he did not participate in the inter-Korean negotiations between Kim Ku and Kim Kyu-sik and left the Korea Independence Party with Sin Ik-hui and others.

In May, he ran for election in Seongdong District, Seoul in the May 10 Constitutional Assembly election and was elected, and on June 1, he was appointed as a member of the Constitutional Basic Committee. From June 17, he was also elected as a member of the Foreign Affairs and Defense Subcommittee of the Constituent National Assembly.

==== After establishment of the government ====
After the establishment of the government on August 15, he was appointed as the first State Council member and non-appointed minister. Afterwards, in 1949, he founded the Korea Nationalist Party, a pro-Rhee political party, with Sin Ik-hui, Louise Yim, and Yun Chi-young, and served as a member of the Supreme Council of the Korean National Party. He then left the party and moved to the Democratic National Party, where he served as a Supreme Council member of the Democratic Nationalist Party and a Supreme Council member of the Democratic National Party. On December 19, 1949, when the Korean Youth League was formed, he was appointed as the highest member of the Korean Youth League. He ran for the second National Assembly seat in 1950 and was elected. He fled from Seoul during the Korean War, but returned to Seoul after the armistice.

He ran as a vice-presidential candidate in the second vice-presidential election on May 16, 1951, but was defeated. He received 2 votes in the first nomination, and 2 votes in the second nomination.

Afterwards, he served as Chairman of the National Assembly Plenary Committee, Chairman of the National Assembly Foreign Affairs Committee, and Chairman of the National Defense Committee of the National Assembly. He joined the Liberal Party and served as a floor leader of the LiberalParty and a member of the Central Committee of the Liberal Party's Central Party. Other social activities included serving as a member of the Central Executive Committee of the Korean Red Cross, president of the Korean Soldiers' Bereaved Families Association, and supreme member of the Korean Anti-Communist Unification League.

=== Death and afterwards ===
He died suddenly at 6:30 pm on January 15, 1957, at his home in Sindang-dong, Seongdong District, Seoul. The funeral was held on January 21 at 10 am at the Central Office Concert Hall and the person was buried at the National Cemetery. In 1962, he was posthumously awarded the Order of Merit for National Foundation.

In 1995, a marker for the site of General Chi Ch'ŏngch'ŏn's house was installed at the site of the house in Samcheong-dong.

On December 10, 2018, Chi Ch'ŏngch'ŏn's diary was designated as Korea's National Registered Cultural Heritage No. 737.

== Education ==
- Graduated from Hansung (Seoul) Pai Chai Academy
- Graduated from the Military Academy of the Korean Empire
- Graduated from Army Central Youth School in Tokyo, Japan
- Graduated from the Imperial Japanese Army Academy
- Graduated from Japanese Army Infantry School
- Bachelor of Public Administration, National Defense University, Republic of China

== Electoral history ==
1948 South Korean Constituent Assembly election - Seongdong

| Candidate | Party | Votes | % |
|---|---|---|---|
| Chi Ch'ŏngch'ŏn | Daedong Youth League | 41,532 | 75.22 |
| Baek Nam-hoon | Independent | 11,108 | 20.12 |
| Yoo Jong-nam | Independent | 2,576 | 4.67 |
| Choi Young-sik | Independent | 0 | 0.00 |
| Total | | 55,216 | 100.00 |

1950 South Korean legislative election - Seongdong A

| Candidate | Party | Votes | % |
|---|---|---|---|
| Chi Ch'ŏngch'ŏn | Democratic Nationalist | 10,551 | 28.35 |
| Kim Myung-jun | National Independence Federation | 8,669 | 23.29 |
| Seon Woo-hun | Choseon Democratic Party | 4,130 | 11.10 |
| Lee Kyu-dong | Independent | 3,095 | 8.32 |
| Jang Hyung | Independent | 2,808 | 7.54 |
| Yoo Jong-nam | Korean Federation of Trade Unions | 2,458 | 6.60 |
| Lee Baek-kyu | Independent | 1,452 | 3.90 |
| Seok Ui-jing | Independent | 1,174 | 3.15 |
| Kim Ho-kyu | Korean Federation of Trade Unions | 928 | 2.49 |
| Lee Man-kyu | Korean Labor Party | 686 | 1.84 |
| Chung Jong-sae | Independent | 520 | 1.40 |
| Choi Yak-han | Korea Nationalist Party | 369 | 0.99 |
| Kim Seong-yul | Independent | 216 | 0.58 |
| Heo Beom-geuk | Independent | 165 | 0.44 |
| Total | | 37,221 | 100.00 |

== See also ==
- Korean independence movement
- Shin Pal-gyun
- Kim Chwajin
- Kim Du-han
- Lee Beom-seok
- Syngman Rhee
- Kim Ku
- Kim Kyu-sik
- Park Chung Hee
- Shin Song-mo
- Sin Ik-hui
- Provisional Government of the Republic of Korea
- Korea Nationalist Party
- Democratic Nationalist Party (South Korea)
- Liberal Party (South Korea)
- Yun Chi-young
- Lee Ki-poong
- Chang Taek-sang
