= List of members of the National Assembly (South Korea), 1950–1954 =

The members of the 2nd National Assembly of South Korea were elected on 10 May 1950. The Assembly sat from 31 May 1950 until 30 May 1954.

== Members ==
Province/City	Constituency	Member	Party	
Province/City	Constituency	Member	At election	At term's end
Seoul	Jung A	Won Se-hun	NIF	NIF
Seoul	Jung B	Jeong Il-hyeong	Independent	Independent
Seoul	Jongno A	Park Sun-cheon	KWA	Independent
Seoul	Jongno B	O Hwa-yeong	Independent	Independent
Seoul	Dongdaemun	Chang Yeon-song	Independent	Independent
Seoul	Seongbuk	Jo So-ang	Socialist	Socialist
Seoul	Seongdong A	Chi Ch'ŏngch'ŏn	DNP	Liberal
Seoul	Seongdong B	Im Heung-sun	DNP	Independent
Seoul	Seodaemun A	Kim Yong-u	Independent	Independent
Seoul	Seodaemun B	Yun Gi-seop	Independent	Independent
Seoul	Mapo A	O Seong-hwan	KNP	Liberal
Seoul	Mapo B	Lee Jong-hyeon	Independent	Democratic
Seoul	Yongsan A	Hwang Seong-su	Independent	Liberal
Seoul	Yongsan B	Nam Song-hak	KNP	Liberal
Seoul	Yeongdeungpo A	Jo Gwang-seop	KFTU	Liberal
Seoul	Yeongdeungpo B	Ryu Hong	NA	NA
Gyeonggi Province	Incheon A	Lee Yong-seol	Independent	Independent
Gyeonggi Province	Incheon B	Kwak Sang-hun	Independent	Independent
Gyeonggi Province	Incheon C	Cho Bong-am	Independent	Independent
Gyeonggi Province	Gaeseong	Kim Dong-seong	Independent	Independent
Gyeonggi Province	Suwon	Hong Gil-seon	DNP	Independent
Gyeonggi Province	Goyang	Choi Guk-hyeon	DNP	Independent
Gyeonggi Province	Gwangju	Sin Ik-hui	DNP	DNP
Gyeonggi Province	Yangju A	Jo Si-won	Socialist	Liberal
Gyeonggi Province	Yangju B	Lee Jin-su	DNP	Liberal
Gyeonggi Province	Pocheon	Yun Seong-sun	Independent	Liberal
Gyeonggi Province	Gapyeong	Hong Ik-pyo	Independent	Independent
Gyeonggi Province	Yangpyeong	Yeo Un-hong	Independent	Independent
Gyeonggi Province	Yeoju	Kim Ui-jun	Independent	Independent
Gyeonggi Province	Icheon	Lee Jong-seong	Independent	Independent
Gyeonggi Province	Yongin	Ryu Gi-su	Independent	Independent
Gyeonggi Province	Anseong	Lee Gyo-seon	Independent	Liberal
Gyeonggi Province	Pyeongtaek	Ahn Chai-hong	Independent	Independent
Gyeonggi Province	Hwaseong A	Kim In-tae	Independent	Independent
Gyeonggi Province	Hwaseong B	Kim Ung-jin	KNP	KNP
Gyeonggi Province	Siheung	Lee Jae-hyeong	KNP	Independent
Gyeonggi Province	Bucheon	Park Je-hwan	Independent	Independent
Gyeonggi Province	Gimpo	Lee Gyo-seung	Independent	Independent
Gyeonggi Province	Ganghwa	Yun Jae-geun	Independent	Independent
Gyeonggi Province	Paju	Lee Dong-hwan	Independent	Liberal
Gyeonggi Province	Jangdan	Baek Sang-gyu	Independent	Independent
Gyeonggi Province	Gaepung	Shin Gwang-gyun	Ilmin	Independent
Gyeonggi Province	Yeonbaek A	Kim Gyeong-bae	KNP	KNP
Gyeonggi Province	Yeonbaek B	Kim Tae-hui	Independent	Independent
Gyeonggi Province	Ongjin A	Seo Beom-seok	Independent	Independent
Gyeonggi Province	Ongjin B	O Ui-gwan	Independent	Independent
Gangwon Province	Chuncheon	Hong Chang-seop	Independent	Liberal
Gangwon Province	Chunseong	Park Seung-ha	Independent	Independent
Gangwon Province	Gangneung A	Park Se-dong	DNP	Liberal
Gangwon Province	Gangneung B	Choi Heon-gil	DNP	Liberal
Gangwon Province	Samcheok	Im Yong-sun	KYA	Independent
Gangwon Province	Uljin	Kim Gwang-jun	Independent	Independent
Gangwon Province	Jeongseon	Lee Jong-yeong (Note: Lee Jong-yeong died on 2 February 1954.)	NA	Independent
Gangwon Province	Pyeongchang	Lee Jong-uk	NA	Liberal
Gangwon Province	Yeongwol	Tae Wan-seon	Independent	Liberal
Gangwon Province	Wonju	Yun Gil-jung	Independent	Independent
Gangwon Province	Hoengseong	Ahn Sang-han	Independent	Independent
Gangwon Province	Hongcheon	Lee Jae-hak	DNP	Liberal
North Chungcheong Province	Cheongju	Min Yeong-bok	Independent	Independent
North Chungcheong Province	Cheongwon A	Lee Do-yeong	Independent	Liberal
North Chungcheong Province	Cheongwon B	Kwak Ui-yeong	Independent	Liberal
North Chungcheong Province	Boeun	Choi Myeon-su	KNP	Liberal
North Chungcheong Province	Okcheon	Shin Gak-hyu	DNP	DNP
North Chungcheong Province	Yeongdong	Seong Deuk-hwan	DNP	DNP
North Chungcheong Province	Jincheon	Lee Chung-hwan	Independent	Liberal
North Chungcheong Province	Gwisan	Yeon Byeong-ho	KNP	Independent
North Chungcheong Province	Eumseong	Lee Hak-rim	Independent	Liberal
North Chungcheong Province	Chungju	Jo Dae-yeon	Independent	Independent
North Chungcheong Province	Jecheon	Han Pil-su	Independent	Liberal
North Chungcheong Province	Danyang	Jo Jong-seung	KNP	KNP
South Chungcheong Province	Daejeon	Kim Jong-yeol	Independent	Liberal
South Chungcheong Province	Daedeok	Kim Jong-hoe (Note: Kim Jong-hoe died on 27 May 1953.)	Independent	Liberal
South Chungcheong Province	Yeongi	Lee Geung-jong (Note: Lee Geung-jong died on 24 January 1951.)	Independent	Independent
South Chungcheong Province	Yeongi	Lee Beom-seung (Note: Lee Beom-seung was by-elected on 5 February 1952, to succeed Lee Geung-jong.)	Independent	Independent
South Chungcheong Province	Gongju A	Park Chung-sik	DNP	Independent
South Chungcheong Province	Gongju B	Kim Myeong-dong (Note: Kim Myeong-dong died in 1950.)	KNP	KNP
South Chungcheong Province	Gongju B	Yun Chi-young (Note: Yun Chi-young was by-elected on 5 February 1952, to succeed Kim Myeong-dong.)	KNP	KNP
South Chungcheong Province	Nonsan A	Kim Heon-sik	Independent	Independent
South Chungcheong Province	Nonsan B	Yun Dam	NA	DNP
South Chungcheong Province	Buyeo A	Lee Seok-gi	Independent	Independent
South Chungcheong Province	Buyeo B	Lee Jong-sun	Independent	Independent
South Chungcheong Province	Seocheon	Ku Deok-hwan	NA	NA
South Chungcheong Province	Boryeong	Kim Yeong-seon	Independent	Independent
South Chungcheong Province	Cheongyang	Lee Sang-cheol	Independent	Independent
South Chungcheong Province	Hongseong	Yu Seung-jun	Independent	Independent
South Chungcheong Province	Yesan	Park Cheol-gyu	NA	NA
South Chungcheong Province	Seosan A	Lee Jong-rin (Note: Lee Jong-rin died on 1 September 1951.)	Ilmin	Ilmin
South Chungcheong Province	Seosan A	Kim Je-neung (Note: Kim Je-neung was by-elected on 5 February 1952, to succeed Lee Jong-rin.)	Liberal	Independent
South Chungcheong Province	Seosan B	Ahn Man-bok	Independent	DNP
South Chungcheong Province	Dangjin	Ku Eul-hoe	Independent	Liberal
South Chungcheong Province	Asan	Lee Gyu-gap	KNP	KNP
South Chungcheong Province	Cheonan	Kim Yong-hwa	KNP	Independent
North Jeolla Province	Jeonju	Park Jeong-geun	Independent	FA
North Jeolla Province	Gunsan	Byeon Gwang-ho	DNP	DNP
North Jeolla Province	Iri	Lee Chun-gi	Independent	DNP
North Jeolla Province	Wanju A	Park Yang-jae	Independent	Liberal
North Jeolla Province	Wanju B	Park Yeong-rae	Independent	Independent
North Jeolla Province	Jinan	Kim Jun-hui	KNP	Independent
North Jeolla Province	Geumsan	Louise Yim	KWNP	KWNP
North Jeolla Province	Muju	Kim Sang-hyeon	Independent	Liberal
North Jeolla Province	Jangsu	Kim U-seong	Independent	Independent
North Jeolla Province	Imsil	Eom Byeong-hak	KNP	Independent
North Jeolla Province	Namwon	Jo Jeong-hun	Independent	Independent
North Jeolla Province	Sunchang	Kim Jeong-du	Independent	Independent
North Jeolla Province	Jeongeup A	Shin Seok-bin	Independent	Independent
North Jeolla Province	Jeongeup B	Kim Taek-sul	WFYF	Independent
North Jeolla Province	Gochang A	Kim Su-hak	Independent	Liberal
North Jeolla Province	Gochang B	Shin Yong-uk	Independent	Liberal
North Jeolla Province	Buan	Choi Byeong-ju	Independent	Independent
North Jeolla Province	Gimje A	Song Bang-yong	Independent	Independent
North Jeolla Province	Gimje B	Choi Yun-ho (Note: Choi Yun-ho died in 1950.)	Independent	Independent
North Jeolla Province	Gimje B	Choi Ju-il (Note: Choi Ju-il was by-elected on 5 February 1952, to succeed Choi Yun-ho.)	KYA	Liberal
North Jeolla Province	Okgu	Ji Yeon-hae	Independent	Liberal
North Jeolla Province	Iksan A	So Seon-gyu	DNP	DNP
North Jeolla Province	Iksan B	Yun Taek-jung	DNP	DNP
South Jeolla Province	Mokpo	Im Gi-bong	KFTU	Independent
South Jeolla Province	Gwangju	Park Cheol-ung	Independent	Liberal
South Jeolla Province	Yeosu	Jeong Jae-wan	Independent	Independent
South Jeolla Province	Suncheon	Kim Yang-su	DNP	DNP
South Jeolla Province	Gwangsan A	Jeong Sun-jo	NA	DNP
South Jeolla Province	Gwangsan B	Jeong In-sik	NA	NA
South Jeolla Province	Boseong	Kim Nak-o	NA	Liberal
South Jeolla Province	Hwasun	Park Min-gi	Independent	DNP
South Jeolla Province	Jangheung	Ko Yeong-wan	DNP	DNP
South Jeolla Province	Gangjin	Yang Byeong-il	DNP	DNP
South Jeolla Province	Haenam A	Yun Yeong-seon	DNP	Independent
South Jeolla Province	Haenam B	Park Gi-bae	Independent	Liberal
South Jeolla Province	Yeongam	Ryu In-gon	KNP	Liberal
South Jeolla Province	Muan A	Kim Yong-mu	DNP	DNP
South Jeolla Province	Muan B	Chang Hong-yeom	DNP	Independent
South Jeolla Province	Naju A	Kim Jong-sun	Independent	Liberal
South Jeolla Province	Naju B	Seo Sang-deok	KYA	Independent
South Jeolla Province	Hampyeong	Seo Sang-guk	DNP	DNP
South Jeolla Province	Yeonggwang	Jeong Heon-jo	KYA	Liberal
South Jeolla Province	Jangseong	Byeon Jin-gap	Independent	Independent
South Jeolla Province	Damyang	Kim Hong-yong (Note: Kim Hong-yong died on 15 August 1950.)	Independent	Independent
South Jeolla Province	Damyang	Kim Mun-yong (Note: Kim Mun-yong was by-elected on 5 February 1952, to succeed Kim Hong-yong.)	Liberal	Liberal
South Jeolla Province	Gokseong	Jo Sun	KYA	Liberal
South Jeolla Province	Gurye	Lee Pan-yeol (Note: Lee Pan-yeol died on 9 December 1950.)	DNP	DNP
South Jeolla Province	Gurye	Lee Han-chang (Note: Lee Han-chang was by-elected on 5 February 1952, to succeed Lee Pan-yeol.)	Liberal	Liberal
South Jeolla Province	Gwangyang	Eom Sang-seop	Independent	Independent
South Jeolla Province	Goheung A	Park Pal-bong	Independent	Independent
South Jeolla Province	Goheung B	Seo Min-ho	Independent	Independent
South Jeolla Province	Wando	Jeong Nam-guk	DNP	DNP
South Jeolla Province	Jindo	Jo Byeong-mun	Independent	Liberal
South Jeolla Province	Yeocheon	Hwang Byeong-gyu	KNP	Liberal
South Jeolla Province	Seungju	Kim Jeong-gi	Independent	Independent
North Gyeongsang Province	Daegu A	Jo Gyeong-gyu	Independent	Liberal
North Gyeongsang Province	Daegu B	Park Seong-ha	CBC	Independent
North Gyeongsang Province	Daegu C	Lee Gap-seong	Independent	Liberal
North Gyeongsang Province	Pohang	Kim Pan-seok	KYA	Liberal
North Gyeongsang Province	Gimcheon	U Mun	KNP	Liberal
North Gyeongsang Province	Dalseong	Kwon O-hun (Note: Kwon O-hun died on 2 February 1951.)	Independent	Independent
North Gyeongsang Province	Dalseong	Bae Eun-hui (Note: Bae Eun-hui was by-elected on 5 February 1952, to succeed Kwon O-hun.)	KNP	Liberal
North Gyeongsang Province	Gunwi	Park Man-won	Independent	Liberal
North Gyeongsang Province	Uiseong A	Park Yeong-chul	KNP	Liberal
North Gyeongsang Province	Uiseong B	Kwon Byeong-no	Independent	Liberal
North Gyeongsang Province	Andong A	Kim Si-hyeon	DNP	DNP
North Gyeongsang Province	Andong B	Kim Ik-gi	IWFP	Liberal
North Gyeongsang Province	Yeongyang	Jo Heon-yeong	Independent	Independent
North Gyeongsang Province	Cheongsong	Kim Bong-jo	Independent	Independent
North Gyeongsang Province	Yeongdeok	Han Guk-won	Independent	Liberal
North Gyeongsang Province	Yeongil A	Choi Won-su	Independent	Independent
North Gyeongsang Province	Yeongil B	Kim Ik-no	Independent	Liberal
North Gyeongsang Province	Gyeongju A	Ahn Yong-dae	Independent	Liberal
North Gyeongsang Province	Gyeongju B	Lee Hyeop-u	KYA	Liberal
North Gyeongsang Province	Yeongcheon A	Kwon Jung-don	Independent	Independent
North Gyeongsang Province	Yeongcheon B	Jo Gyu-seol	Independent	Independent
North Gyeongsang Province	Gyeongsan	Bang Man-su	Independent	Liberal
North Gyeongsang Province	Cheongdo	Kim Jun-tae	Independent	Independent
North Gyeongsang Province	Goryeong	Kwak Tae-jin	DNP	DNP
North Gyeongsang Province	Seongju	Bae Sang-yeon	Independent	Liberal
North Gyeongsang Province	Chilgok	Chang Taek-sang	Independent	Independent
North Gyeongsang Province	Geumneung	Yeo Yeong-bok	Independent	Independent
North Gyeongsang Province	Seonsan	Yuk Hong-gyun	KNP	Liberal
North Gyeongsang Province	Sangju A	Park Seong-u	Independent	Independent
North Gyeongsang Province	Sangju B	Baek Nam-sik	NA	Independent
North Gyeongsang Province	Mungyeong	Yang Jae-ha	Independent	Independent
North Gyeongsang Province	Yecheon	Lee Ho-geun	KYA	Liberal
North Gyeongsang Province	Yeongju	Kim Jeong-sik	KYA	Independent
North Gyeongsang Province	Bonghwa	Jeong Mun-heum	Independent	Liberal
North Gyeongsang Province	Ulleung	Seo I-hwan	Ilmin	Independent
South Gyeongsang Province	Busan A	Kim Ji-tae	Independent	Liberal
South Gyeongsang Province	Busan B	Chang Geon-sang	Independent	Liberal
South Gyeongsang Province	Busan C	Kim Chil-seong	Independent	Independent
South Gyeongsang Province	Busan D	Jeong Gi-won	Independent	Liberal
South Gyeongsang Province	Busan E	Choi Won-bong (Note: Choi Won-bong died on 10 November 1950.)	Independent	Independent
South Gyeongsang Province	Busan E	Jeon Jin-han (Note: Jeon Jin-han was by-elected on 5 February 1952, to succeed Choi Won-bong.)	KFTU	Independent
South Gyeongsang Province	Masan	Kwon Tae-uk	Independent	Independent
South Gyeongsang Province	Jinju	Ryu Deok-cheon	Independent	Independent
South Gyeongsang Province	Jinyang	Ha Man-bok	Independent	Independent
South Gyeongsang Province	Uiryeong	Lee Si-mok	Independent	Independent
South Gyeongsang Province	Haman	Yang U-jeong (Note: Yang U-jeong resigned on 3 April 1954.)	Independent	Independent
South Gyeongsang Province	Changnyeong	Shin Yong-hun	Independent	Independent
South Gyeongsang Province	Milyang A	Choi Seong-ung	KYA	Independent
South Gyeongsang Province	Milyang B	Kim Hyeong-deok	Independent	Liberal
South Gyeongsang Province	Yangsan	Seo Jang-ju	Independent	Liberal
South Gyeongsang Province	Ulsan A	O Wi-yeong	Independent	Independent
South Gyeongsang Province	Ulsan B	Kim Taek-cheon	Independent	Independent
South Gyeongsang Province	Dongnae	Kim Beom-bu	Independent	Independent
South Gyeongsang Province	Gimhae A	Choi Won-ho	DNP	DNP
South Gyeongsang Province	Gimhae B	Lee Jong-su	Independent	Liberal
South Gyeongsang Province	Changwon A	Kim Byeong-jin	KYA	Independent
South Gyeongsang Province	Changwon B	Kim Bong-jae	Independent	Independent
South Gyeongsang Province	Tongyeong A	Seo Sang-ho	Independent	Independent
South Gyeongsang Province	Tongyeong B	Lee Chae-o	Independent	Independent
South Gyeongsang Province	Goseong	Kim Jeong-sil	Independent	Liberal
South Gyeongsang Province	Sacheon	Jeong Heon-ju	Independent	Independent
South Gyeongsang Province	Namhae	Jo Ju-yeong	Independent	Liberal
South Gyeongsang Province	Hadong	Lee Sang-gyeong	NA	NA
South Gyeongsang Province	Sancheong	Lee Byeong-hong	Independent	Independent
South Gyeongsang Province	Hamyang	Park Jeong-gyu	NA	Liberal
South Gyeongsang Province	Geochang	Shin Jung-mok	Independent	Liberal
South Gyeongsang Province	Hapcheon A	No Gi-yong	Independent	DNP
South Gyeongsang Province	Hapcheon B	Kim Myeong-su	DNP	DNP
Jeju Province	Bukjeju A	Kim In-seon	NA	Liberal
Jeju Province	Bukjeju B	Kang Chang-yong	Independent	Liberal
Jeju Province	Namjeju	Kang Kyeong-ok	Independent	Liberal
