= Yi Yun-yong =

South Korean politician

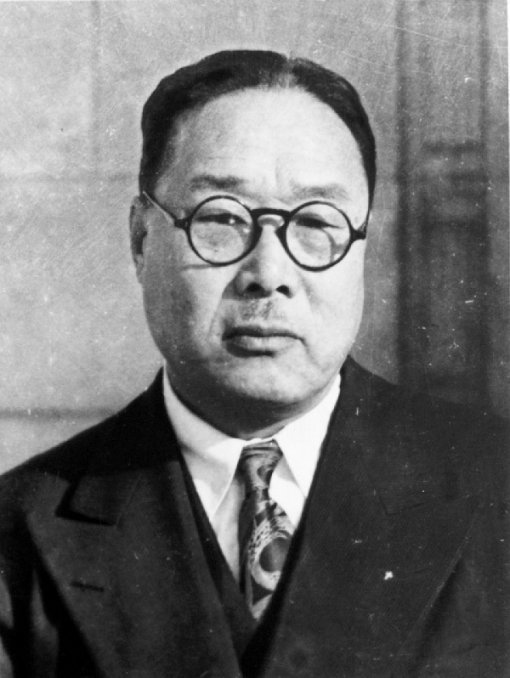

Acting Prime Minister of South Korea
- In office April 24, 1952 – May 6, 1952
- President: Syngman Rhee
- Preceded by: Chang Myon
- Succeeded by: Jang Taek-sang

Personal details
- Born: August 19, 1890 Yŏngbyŏn, P'yŏngan Province, Joseon
- Died: October 15, 1975 (aged 85) Seoul, South Korea

Korean name
- Hangul: 이윤영
- Hanja: 李允榮
- RR: I Yunyeong
- MR: I Yunyŏng

Yi Yun-young (Korean: 이윤영; August 19, 1890 – October 15, 1975) was an independence activist, educator, and Methodist minister during the Japanese occupation of Korea. His family clan originated in Danyang, and he was from Yongbyon in Pyonganbuk-do. His art name was Baeksa. During the March 1st Independence Movement, he was arrested for holding a lecture declaring independence and protesting against the Japanese occupation. In 1940, his pastoral qualifications were suspended because he opposed the unification of the churches in Korea and Japan and refused to adapt Sōshi-kaimei. After the Liberation, he participated with Cho Man-sik in the Committee for the Preparation of Korean Independence, founded the Korean Democratic Party, and was active as the party's vice leader. After his escape to the South, he was recommended as acting prime minister. After the establishment of Korea's government, he was named to be the first prime minister, but he was defeated because of the rejection of his confirmation by the Korea Democratic Party. After that, he was named to be the prime minister three more times, but each time he was rejected. Being one of Syngman Rhee's closest allies, he served as Minister without Portfolio and Minister of Social Affairs during the First Republic. He ran for vice president representing the anti-Lee Ki-poong faction but was defeated. After the May 16th Coup, he was Chairman of the Committee for Struggle against the prolongation of Military Government and executive member of the People's Party. He was an aide of Cho Man-sik, then after he defected to the South, he worked as an aide to Syngman Rhee.

== Early life ==
Yi Yun-young was born on August 19, 1890, in Yeongbyeon-gun, North Pyongan Province, as the son of Lee Yong-pil. He studied Chinese classics from 1896 to 1905, read the Four Books and Three Classics alone in 1901 when he was 12 years old, and entered Sungdeok Middle School, founded by an American Methodist missionary, in 1905. After graduating from Soongdeok Middle School in 1907, he moved to Seoul, dropped out of Gyeongseong Central YMCA English School in 1908, and studied land surveying at Gyeongseong Industrial Training Center (later Gyeongseong High Technical School) in 1909. Even so, he dropped out of the Gyeongsang Industrial Training Center and entered Pyongyang's Soongsil Normal College in 1910.

He graduated from Soongsil Normal College in 1912 and served as principal of Unsan Elementary School in 1913. In December 1913, he quit his job as principal of Unsan Elementary School and moved to Seoul in March 1914, where he studied at Gyeongseong Methodist Theological Seminary from 1915 to 1917. After majoring in theology at Gyeongseongbu Methodist Theological Seminary in 1917, he was ordained as a pastor. That year, while giving lectures as an evangelist, he became the pastor of a pioneer church.

== Independence activism and pastoral activities ==
=== Participation in the March 1st Independence Movement and imprisonment ===
In 1919, while working at the church as the principal of Ilshin Elementary School in Suncheon, South Pyongan Province, he participated in the March 1st Independence Movement. Although he did not sign as one of the 33 national representatives during the March 1st Movement, he held a declaration of independence lecture and a declaration of independence in Sinchang-eup near Suncheon. He developed and led a protest movement, but was arrested and imprisoned by the police at the Japanese Government General of Korea as the ringleader, and served one year and two months in prison. He was released from prison in 1920.

=== Activities as a pastor ===
After being released from prison, he worked as a Methodist pastor in Baecheon, Jinnampo, and Gaeseong. In the 1930s, he refused to visit Japanese shrines, and became a person who was surveilled. In 1934, he was appointed pastor of Namsanhyeon Church in Pyongyang.

He was close to Jeong Il-hyung's family and officiated at the wedding of Jeong Il-hyung and Lee Tae-young at the auditorium of Jeongui Girls' High School in Pyongyang on December 26, 1936. The wedding congratulatory address was given by Tosan Ahn Chang-ho.

== After Independence ==
=== Political activities right after Independence ===
Immediately after liberation on August 15, he participated in the South Pyeongan Province branch of the Committee for the Preparation of Korean Independence, and organized the Pyongyang People's Political Committee with Cho Man-sik as chairman and was elected as vice chairman.

In October 1945, he founded the Joseon Democratic Party with Cho Man-sik and was elected as vice-chairman. He was also elected as vice chairman of the Pyongyang People's Political Committee. However, when the Soviet army occupied North Korea in October 1945, there was friction with the communist camp, and when the resolution opposing trusteeship that was sent to Gyeongseong became a problem, he defected to South Korea with other party members, including Han Geun-jo, in February 1946. Afterwards, he reorganized and became active in the Joseon Democratic Party in South Korea. Meanwhile, as he was selected as Syngman Rhee's close associate, he broke up with Han Geun-jo, who took an anti-Rhee line.

In January 1946, he participated in the movement against trusteeship along with Kim Ku, Jo So-ang, Kim Seong-su, and Syngman Rhee.

On January 26, 1947, he participated in the formation of the anti-trusteeship independence struggle group held at Gyeonggyojang and was elected as one of the leading members of the anti-trusteeship struggle group.

=== Participation in establishing a government ===
On May 10, 1948, he ran as a candidate for a member of the Constitutional Assembly in Jongno A, Seoul and was elected. He was appointed a member of the Constitutional Basic Committee on June 1.

On July 22, he was confirmed as the first prime minister by Syngman Rhee, but it was canceled due to opposition from the Korea Democratic Party within the National Assembly. Afterwards, he was appointed prime minister four times during the First Republic, but his confirmation was rejected all four times. In August, he took office as one of the non-appointed ministers in the first cabinet. On October 6 of that year, he participated in the first meeting of the economic aid talks along with Minister of Finance Kim Do-yeon, Minister of Planning Lee Soon-tak, and Minister of Legal Affairs Yoo Jin-oh, and during the negotiations, on October 12, he received support for surplus agricultural and fishery products and relief supplies from the United States, while requesting and succeeding in deleting the clause specifying guidance and supervision of the Korean government as an interference in internal affairs clause.

After being rejected as prime minister, he served as minister without office from August 2, 1948. On January 9, 1950, he was appointed an advisor to the Student Tennis Federation. On September 27, 1948, he was designated as minister without appointment and served.

He served as the Minister of Social Affairs without appointment and as the second Minister of Social Affairs, and also inspected the front lines as Minister of Social Affairs during the Korean War. In 1952, he again became minister without office. While he was serving as a non-appointed minister, he was again appointed prime minister, but was rejected again. He continued to serve as a non-appointed minister and then retired.

He ran as a vice-presidential candidate in the third vice-presidential election in March 1952, but was defeated. In 1953, he served as dean of Shinheung University (now Kyung Hee University). On March 20, 1956, he was elected as the 4th president of the Korean Oratory Association. On August 1, 1957, he resigned from his position as president of the Korean Oratory Association.

=== Before and after the April 19th Movement ===
In 1956, he again ran as a vice presidential candidate in the 4th vice presidential election, but was defeated. In 1959, Yi thought that the country's luck had run out and went to Gyeongmudae to give advice to Syngman Rhee. However, because Lee Ki-poong did not allow them to meet, Yi ended up not being able to achieve his goal and turned away. After being refused a meeting with the president, Yi ran again as a vice presidential candidate. People around him tried to stop him from running for vice president. However, Yi said that he was running to defeat Lee Ki-poong.

Does anyone who goes to a wrestling match necessarily go there to win? They go to tear up the belt even if they lose! It's to get rid of Lee Ki-boong.

Lee Ki-poong sent someone to Lee Yun-young and suggested that if he resign and support him he would send him 100 million won, but Lee Yun-young strongly reprimanded the person and sent him back. He was defeated in the 4th Vice President election. Afterwards, he was kept in check by Lee Ki-poong's forces and was not allowed to enter Gyeongmudae for a while. Immediately after the April 19 Revolution in 1960, he briefly joined the Gyeongmudae, but Syngman Rhe was soon forced to resign.

=== Opposition politician ===
Afterwards, he retired from politics and engaged in pastoral and lecture activities. After the May 16 Military Coup in 1961, he served as Chairman of the Struggle Committee Against the Extension of Military Government and Supreme Council Member of the People's Party. In the latter half of his life, he was elected as president of the Zai North Association East Celebration Competition.

After participating in the reconstruction of Gwangseong High School, which was an evacuation school during the Korean War, he served as a lifelong director of the foundation. In 1969, he was elected as a member of the National Unification Council, and that year, around the time of the three-term constitutional amendment, he was appointed to the Republican National Election Committee.

== Rejection of confirmation for prime ministerial candidate ==
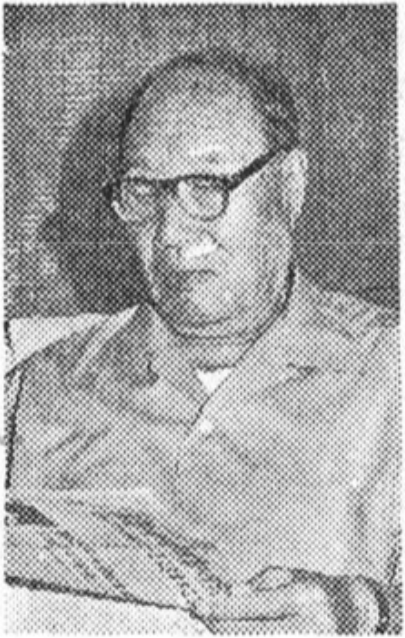
Yi Yun-yong in 1972.

On July 27, 1948, Syngman Rhee attended the National Assembly and announced Yi as his nominee for prime minister. Yi was the vice-chairman of the North Korea-based Joseon Democratic Party, so it had symbolic significance for national unification, but the National Assembly refused confirmation by a vote of 132 to 59.

On April 3, 1950, Lee Beom-seok resigned as prime minister for political reasons. Syngman Rhee invited representatives of each faction in the National Assembly to Gyeongmudae on the night of the 3rd and recommended Chough Pyung-ok, Shin Heung-u, and Shin Song-mo as prime ministers, but when each faction showed reluctance, he again appointed Yi as prime minister and requested approval from the National Assembly. However, in a vote in the National Assembly on April 6, Yi was rejected with 68 votes in favor, 83 against, and 3 abstentions among the 155 members present.

When Prime Minister Chang Taek-sang resigned on October 5, 1952, Syngman Rhee nominated Yi as his third successor and requested approval from the National Assembly. He appointed Baek Du-jin as Minister of Finance as prime minister until the National Assembly's approval, but Yi was rejected again.

== Profile ==
- Graduated from Pyongyang Soongsil Normal School
- Worked as a teacher
- Taecheon Elementary School Principal
- Principal of Bongcheon Elementary School
- Principal of Unsan Elementary School
- Methodist pastor
- Imprisoned for the March 1st Movement in 1919
- Pastoral ministry in Baecheon, Jinnampo, Kaesong, Pyongyang, etc.
- In the 1930s, he refused to visit the shrine of the Japanese Government General of Korea.
- After the Pacific War in 1941, he refused to change his name.
- Participation in the South Pyongan Province Branch of the Committee for the Preparation of Korean Independence
- Deputy Leader of the Democratic Party of Korea in October 1945
- Moved to South Korea
- During the Yeosu Rebellion, he visited Yeosu and Suncheon in South Jeolla Province as a special envoy of the president.
- During the Jeju April 3 Incident, he was dispatched to Jeju Island as Syngman Rhee's special envoy.
- Constitutional Assembly Member (Jongno A)
- Minister of Social Affairs
- Prime Minister of South Korea
- Dean of Shinheung University
- In 1960, he ran as a vice-presidential candidate in the 4th presidential election.
- Chairman of the Struggle Committee Against Extension of Military Government in 1962

== Assessement ==
Yun Chi-young, another close associate of Syngman Rhee, said, "Mr. Yi Yun-young was a very gentle person. I am sorry that he passed away after becoming Dr. Yi's comrade, setting a grand goal and suffering due to lack of understanding from the people working on the front lines."

== Other ==
He also criticized the changing harshness of society. According to him, it was an unpleasant scene in modern society. A true friend is one who knows a friend in times of trouble. These examples were instructive to us. However, the human spirit of the world is like a flock of sparrows, which fly to the pile to eat grains, pick them up, and fly away after eating them all. He criticized the world as seen in society by saying, "People gather for food, benefits, rights, etc. rather than loyalty, morality, and friendship, but they all go away after they run out of things to covet."

== Writings ==
Memoirs of Baeksa Yi Yun-young

== Family ==
He was related to Jeong Il-hyung. Yi's wife, Imadae, was Jeong Il-hyeong's mother's 6th cousin sister. Therefore, Jeong Il-hyung was the son of Yi's sister-in-law, that is, he was about the same age as his wife's nephew.

Yi Tae-young was also a member of Namsan-hyeon Church in Pyongyang when Yi was appointed pastor of Namsan-hyeon Church in Pyongyang. Lee Taeyoung attended Namsanhyeon Church and taught Sunday school, so she often met Pastor Yi. It is said that Yi cared for Lee Tae-young very much. However, he became a close associate of Syngman Rhee, and Jeong Il-hyung joined the Democratic Party, leading to a split.

== See also ==
- Prime Minister of South Korea
- Cho Man-sik
- Choe Yong-gon
- Yun Chi-young
- Lee Ki-poong
- Syngman Rhee
- Chang Myon
- Chang Taek-sang
- First Republic of Korea
- May 16 coup
- Lee Beom-seok

== Election History ==
1948 South Korean Constituent Assembly election - Jongno A

Candidate	Party	Votes	%
Yi Yun-yong	Choseon Democratic Party	20,497	56.11
Park Sun-cheon	Patriotic Wives' Association for the National Association for the Rapid Realisation of Korean Independence	5,518	15.11
Seo Sang-chun	Korean Independent Youth League	4,456	12.20
Choi Jin	Democracy Freedom Independence	1,510	4.13
Park Yong-rae	Korean Christian Association	1,463	4.01
Kim Dae-sook	Independent	1,322	3.62
Kim Eun-bae	Independent	1,085	2.97
Oh Sam-ju	Independent	676	1.85
Total		36,527	100.00

1952 South Korea vice presidential election

Candidate	Party	Votes	%
Ham Tae-young	Independent	2,943,813	41.27
Lee Beom-seok	Liberal Party	1,815,692	25.45
Chough Pyung-ok	Democratic Nationalist Party	575,260	8.06
Lee Gap-sung	Liberal Party Movement	500,972	7.02
Yi Yun-yong	Choseon Democratic Party	458,583	6.43
Jeon Jin-han	General Alliance of Laborers for Korean Independence	302,471	4.24
Louise Yim	Liberal Party Movement	190,211	2.67
Pak Sung-wook	Independent	181,388	2.54
Jeong Ki-won	Liberal Party Movement	164,907	2.31
Total		7,133,297	100.00
Valid votes		7,133,297	98.11
Invalid/blank votes		137,585	1.89
Total votes		7,270,882	100.00
Registered voters/turnout		8,259,428	88.03

1956 South Korean vice presidential election

Candidate	Party	Votes	%
Chang Myon	Democratic Party	4,012,654	46.43
Lee Ki-poong	Liberal Party	3,805,502	44.03
Lee Beom-seok	Independent	317,579	3.67
Yun Chi-young	Korea Nationalist Party	241,278	2.79
Paeg Song-uk	Independent	230,555	2.67
Yi Yun-yong	Choseon Democratic Party	34,926	0.40
Total		8,642,494	100.00
Valid votes		8,642,494	95.35
Invalid/blank votes		421,700	4.65
Total votes		9,064,194	100.00
Registered voters/turnout		9,606,870	94.35

Preceded by Chang Myon	Acting Prime Minister of South Korea; 1952	Succeeded by Jang Taek-sang
