= 2nd National Assembly of South Korea =

1950–1954 legislature of South Korea

Second National Assembly of the Republic of Korea
←	1st	3rd	→
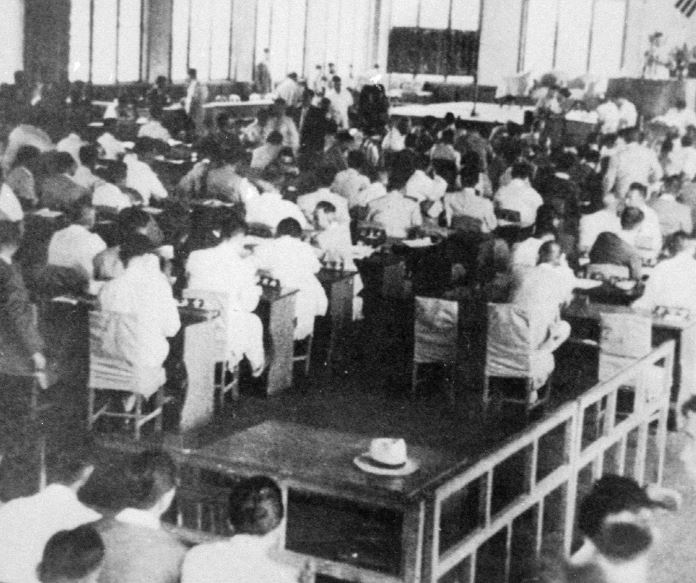
- The assembly in exile from Seoul, 1950

Overview
- Legislative body: National Assembly of South Korea
- Meeting place: Seoul Capitol (1950, 1953–4); Mudeokjeon (1951–3) and other locations
- Term: May 31, 1950 – May 30, 1954
- Election: 1950 South Korean legislative election
- Government: Syngman Rhee government

National Assembly (1950–1952) House of Representatives (1952–1954)
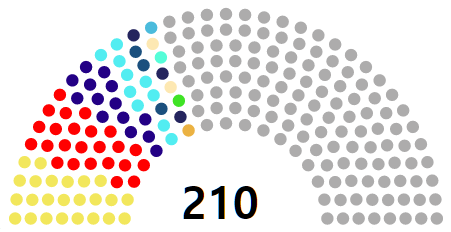
- Composition of the assembly following the 1950 election
- Members: 210
- Speaker: Sin Ik-hui
- Deputy Speakers: Chang Taek-sang; Kim Dong-seong; Cho Bong-am; Yun Chi-young

The Second National Assembly of South Korea was established on May 31, 1950, consisting of 210 representatives elected during the 1950 South Korean legislative election. Following the outbreak of the Korean War on June 25 of the same year, the assembly relocated to the provisional capital of Busan, with several of its members killed or abducted by North Korean forces.

Under President Syngman Rhee's declaration of martial law, the assembly came under increased political pressure from police and military forces. Rhee's efforts successfully resulted in the first amendment of the South Korean constitution, albeit not without political strife. The amended Constitution, which introduced direct presidential elections and a bicameral assembly, rendered the incumbent National Assembly into the House of Representatives. A separate election for a planned upper house, named the House of Councillors, was never initiated during the term of the second assembly.

== Members ==
First National Assembly Party Name		Number of Members (total 200)
Korea Nationalist	KNP	24
Democratic Nationalist	DNP	24
National Association	NSRRKI	14
Taehan Youth Corps		10
Korean Federation of Trade Unions		3
Ilmin Club		3
Socialist Party		2
National Independence Federation	NIF	1
Korean Women's Association		1
Central Buddhist Committee		1
Women's Nationalist Party		1
Independents		126

== Major Events ==
- May 31, 1950: The second National Assembly of the Republic of Korea held its first meeting in Seoul Capitol.
- June 25, 1950: A state-of-emergency meeting is held with the leading members of government present following the invasion of North Korean forces into the South.
- July 27, 1950: The assembly relocates its meeting place to the Culture Cinema in Daegu following the evacuation of the government on June 27.
- September 1, 1950: The assembly relocates its meeting place to the Culture Cinema (Korean: 문화극장) in Busan as KPA forces closed in on Daegu.
- October 7, 1950: The assembly returns to Seoul Capitol following the recapture of Seoul.
- December 8, 1950: The assembly relocates its meeting place to the Seoul National Hall in Taepyeongno, Seoul.
- January 4, 1951: The assembly relocates its meeting place to Busan Cinema, in Jung District, Busan following the Third Battle of Seoul.
- May 16, 1951: The assembly votes Kim Seong-su as the second Vice President of the Republic of Korea.
- June 27, 1951: The assembly relocates its meeting place to Mudeokjeon (무덕전), a building within the old Provincial Office of South Gyeongsang in Busan.
- January 18, 1952: The assembly rejects the amendment bill by a vote of 19 to 142.
- February 20, 1952: The National Assembly Library of Korea opens in Busan, with 3,604 documents in storage.
- July 4, 1952: The amendment to the Constitution is ratified by the assembly.
- August 5, 1952: Syngman Rhee wins the 1952 South Korean presidential election.
- August 15, 1952: Syngman Rhee is sworn in as the 2nd President of South Korea.
- September 21, 1953: The assembly returns to Seoul Capitol following the armistice on July 27.

== Major legislation ==
- September 8, 1951: State Compensation Act, No. 231
- May 10, 1953: Labor Standards Act, No. 286
- September 18, 1953: Criminal Act, No. 293
- April 1, 1954: Punishment of Minor Offenses Act, No. 316
