= Constituent National Assembly (South Korea) =

1948–1950 legislature of South Korea

First National Assembly of the Republic of Korea
2nd	→
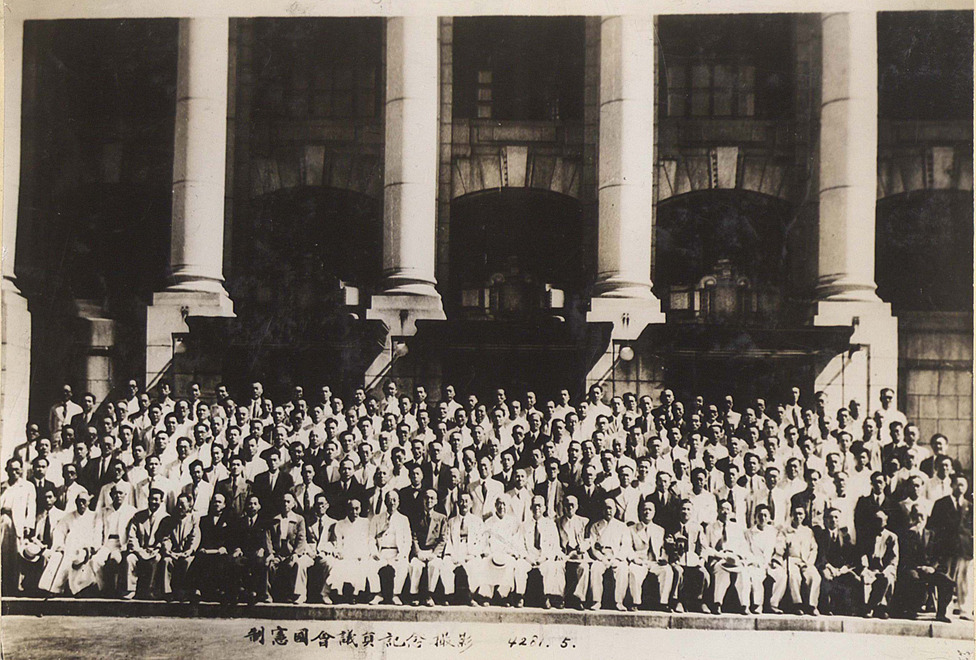
- Commemorative photo, May 31, 1948

Overview
- Legislative body: National Assembly of South Korea
- Meeting place: Seoul Capitol
- Term: May 31, 1948 – May 30, 1950
- Election: 1948 South Korean Constitutional Assembly election
- Government: United States Army Military Government in Korea; Syngman Rhee government

National Assembly
- Composition of the assembly following the 1948 election
- Members: 200
- Chairmen: Syngman Rhee (1948); Sin Ik-hui (1948–1950)
- Vice Chairmen: Sin Ik-hui; Kim Yak-su; Yun Chi-young; Kim Dong-won
- Prime Minister: Lee Beom-seok

Korean name
- Hangul: 대한민국 제헌 국회
- Hanja: 大韓民國制憲國會
- RR: Daehanminguk jeheon gukhoe
- MR: Taehanmin'guk chehŏn kukhoe

The Constituent National Assembly (Korean: 대한민국 제헌 국회) of South Korea was the constituent and first National Assembly of the Republic of Korea. Consisting of 200 members elected for the election on May 10, 1948, it was formed on May 31, 1948, and served for two years until May 30, 1950. Syngman Rhee was invited to be the first interim chairman and the National Assembly chairman, and Sin Ik-hui and Kim Dong-won were elected as vice chairmen.

Formed under the mandate of the United Nations General Assembly, the constituent assembly ratified the constitution of the Republic of Korea and voted Syngman Rhee as the first president of the Republic.

== Members ==
First National Assembly Party Name		Number of Members (total 200)
National Association	NSRRKI	55
Korea Democratic	KDP	29
Taedong Youth Association		12
National Youth Association		6
Farmers' Federation		2
Taehan Labor Federation		1
Korean Democratic		1
Education Association		1
Taesung		1
Korean Republican		1
Pusan 15 Club		1
Tanmin		1
Taehan Youth Association		1
National Unification		1
Propagation		1
Korea Independence		1
Independents		85

== History ==
=== Formation ===
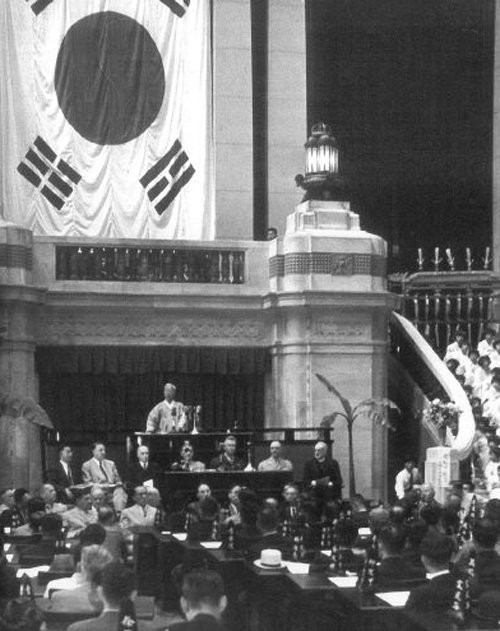
Opening ceremony on May 31, 1948

With further discussions over the creation of a united Korean government halted over the failures of the US-Soviet Joint Commission and the subsequent outbreak of political violence within Korea, calls for an immediate establishment of a separate Korean government grew within right-wing spheres south of the 38th parallel. With U.S. leaders disillusioned by the lack of progress made through the Joint Commission, the "Korean question" was submitted to the United Nations under the responsibility of the First Committee to the United Nations General Assembly on September 23, 1947. Notwithstanding Soviet opposition, the General Assembly adopted Resolution 112 on November 14, which stipulated that elections would be held in both regions of Korea to elect representatives who would establish an independent Korean government under UN supervision, but before the complete withdrawal of all foreign forces from the peninsula could take place. The elections would be supervised by a special commission of eleven nations known as the United Nations Temporary Commission on Korea (UNTCOK).

Pyongyang's staunch refusal to make any contact with UNTCOK delegates initially left the commission divided, with Nationalist China and the Philippines advocating for the creation of an independent government in the south amidst the skepticism of the rest of the committee. On February 27, however, an interim committee of the General Assembly adopted American Ambassador-at-Large Philip C. Jessup's resolution, which stipulated that immediate elections take place in Korea. Despite opposition from an anti-election faction within the committee, a legislative election eventually took place exclusively in South Korea on May 10, 1948, under UNTCOK supervision. The 1948 election appointed 198 representatives from 198 constituencies (two more representatives were elected from the two constituencies of Jeju in 1949, where elections were postponed due to the Jeju Uprising), with Syngman Rhee's National Society for the Rapid Realization of Korean Independence (NSRRKI) winning the most seats out of any party.

On May 31, 1948, at 10:20 a.m. KST, the 198 representatives gathered together at the Seoul Capitol for the first meeting of the first National Assembly. Rhee, winning 188 out of 198 votes, was voted as the assembly's first interim chairman, along with Sin Ik-hui and Kim Dong-won as vice chairmen.

=== Major events ===
- July 12, 1948: The assembly adopts the Constitution of the Republic of Korea.
- July 17, 1948: The Constitution is promulgated.
- July 20, 1948: Syngman Rhee is elected as the republic's first president by the assembly, receiving 180 votes out of the 196 members who were present.
- July 24, 1948: Rhee is sworn into office.
- July 27, 1948: Rhee's initial nomination of Yi Yun-yong as Prime Minister of South Korea is rejected.
- July 29, 1948: The assembly approve's Rhee's nomination of Lee Beom-seok as prime minister.
- August 15, 1948: The Republic of Korea is declared, marking the official transfer of power from the American military administration to an independent Korean state.

=== Major legislation ===
- July 17, 1948: Government Organization Act, No. 1
- September 22, 1948: Act for the Punishment of Persons Who Engaged in Anti-National Activities, No. 3
- December 1, 1948: National Security Act, No.10
- June 22, 1949: Land Redistribution Act, No. 31

== See also ==
- 1946 North Korean local elections
- 1947 North Korean local elections
- People's Republic of Korea
- National Assembly of Korea
