= 1952 South Korean local elections =

Local elections were held in South Korea on 25 April 1952 for city, town and township councils and on 10 May 1952 for provincial councils. 306 provincial councilors, 378 city councilors, 1,115 town councilors and 16,051 township councilors were elected.

== City, town and township council elections ==
Elections for city, town and township councils were held on 25 April 1952.

Party	City councils			Town councils			Township councils		
Party	Votes	%	Seats	Votes	%	Seats	Votes	%	Seats
Liberal Party			114			274			4,056
Korea Youth Party			40			229			2,574
National Association			29			155			2,437
Democratic Nationalist Party			7			7			21
Korean Federation of Trade Unions			5			6			12
Korea Nationalist Party			2			0			16
Other parties			9			14			68
Independents			172			430			6,867
Invalid/blank votes		–	–		–	–		–	–
Total	891,728	100	378	649,544	100	1,115	5,295,462	100	16,051
Registered voters/turnout	1,111,489	80.23	–	734,538	88.43	–	5,689,917	93.07	–
Source: Council of Local Authorities for International Relations

== Provincial council elections ==
Elections for provincial councils were held on 10 May 1952.

Party	Votes	%	Seats
Liberal Party			147
Korea Youth Party			34
National Association			32
Democratic Nationalist Party			4
Korean Federation of Trade Unions			2
Other parties			2
Independents			85
Invalid/blank votes		–	–
Total	5,165,226	100	306
Registered voters/turnout	6,358,383	81.23	–
Source: Council of Local Authorities for International Relations

=== Results per province ===
Region	Seats							
Region	Total	Liberal	Youth	National Association	Democratic Nationalist	Federation of Trade Unions	Other	Ind.
North Chungcheong	28	18	1	2	0	0	0	7
South Chungcheong	46	23	9	2	1	0	1	10
North Jeolla	32	13	9	1	1	0	0	8
South Jeolla	59	49	2	2	1	1	0	4
North Gyeongsang	61	18	6	11	0	0	1	25
South Gyeongsang	60	19	3	11	1	1	0	25
Jeju	20	7	4	3	0	0	0	6
Total	306	147	34	32	4	2	2	85
