= Kim Woo-sung =

Kim Woo-sung may refer to:

- Kim Woo-sung (alpine skier) (born 1986), South Korean alpine skier
- Kim Woo-sung (singer) (born 1993), Korean-American singer
- Kim Woo-sung (politician) (1912–1916), South Korean politician, member of the National Assembly, 1950–1954
- Kim Woo-sung (referee), South Korean FIFA referee
