= 1946 South Korean legislative election =

Elections to the Interim Legislative Assembly were held in South Korea in October 1946.

== Background ==
The establishment of the Interim Legislative Assembly was announced by Archer L. Lerch of the United States Army Military Government on 1 July 1946. The Assembly was to replace the Democratic Council set up in February, and its purpose was to write draft laws. It would have 90 members; 45 elected and 45 appointed by Military Governor John R. Hodge.

== Campaign ==
The Interim Legislative Assembly was unpopular with a majority of Koreans who opposed the planned four-power trusteeship to run the country for five years. The conservative Korea Democratic Party (KDP) opposed its existence due to many of its leaders being excluded. However, the party did participate in the elections, unlike the left-wing parties, which simply ignored it; the Communists, Syngman Rhee and Kim Gu all boycotted the elections.

In September 1946, thousands of laborers and peasants rose up against the military government. This uprising was quickly defeated, and failed to prevent the elections.

== Results ==
Several KDP leaders were elected in Seoul, but Kim Kyu-sik claimed that there had been electoral fraud in Seoul and Gangwon. As a result, Hodge annulled the results and the elections were re-run in the two areas.

The majority of those elected were supporters of Rhee. Of the appointed members, one was from the KDP, one from National Society for the Rapid Realisation of Korean Independence and the remaining 43 were "moderates", including several former members of the Provisional Government of the Republic of Korea.

== Aftermath ==
The opening of the Assembly was delayed to 12 December to investigate widespread allegations of electoral fraud.

== See also ==
- Division of Korea
