= 1950 South Korean legislative election =

- 30 May 1950
- All 210 seats in the House of Representatives; 106 seats needed for a majority
- Turnout: 91.91%
Party	Leader	Vote %	Seats
Democratic Nationalist	Sin Ik-hui; Kim Seong-su	9.79	24
Nationalist	Yun Chi-young	9.69	24
National Association	Syngman Rhee	6.77	14
Korea Youth		3.26	10
Federation of Trade Unions		1.69	10
Socialist		1.28	2
Ilmin Club		1.02	3
National Independence		0.48	1
Other parties	–	2.18	3
Independents	–	62.93	126
This lists parties that won seats. See the complete results below.
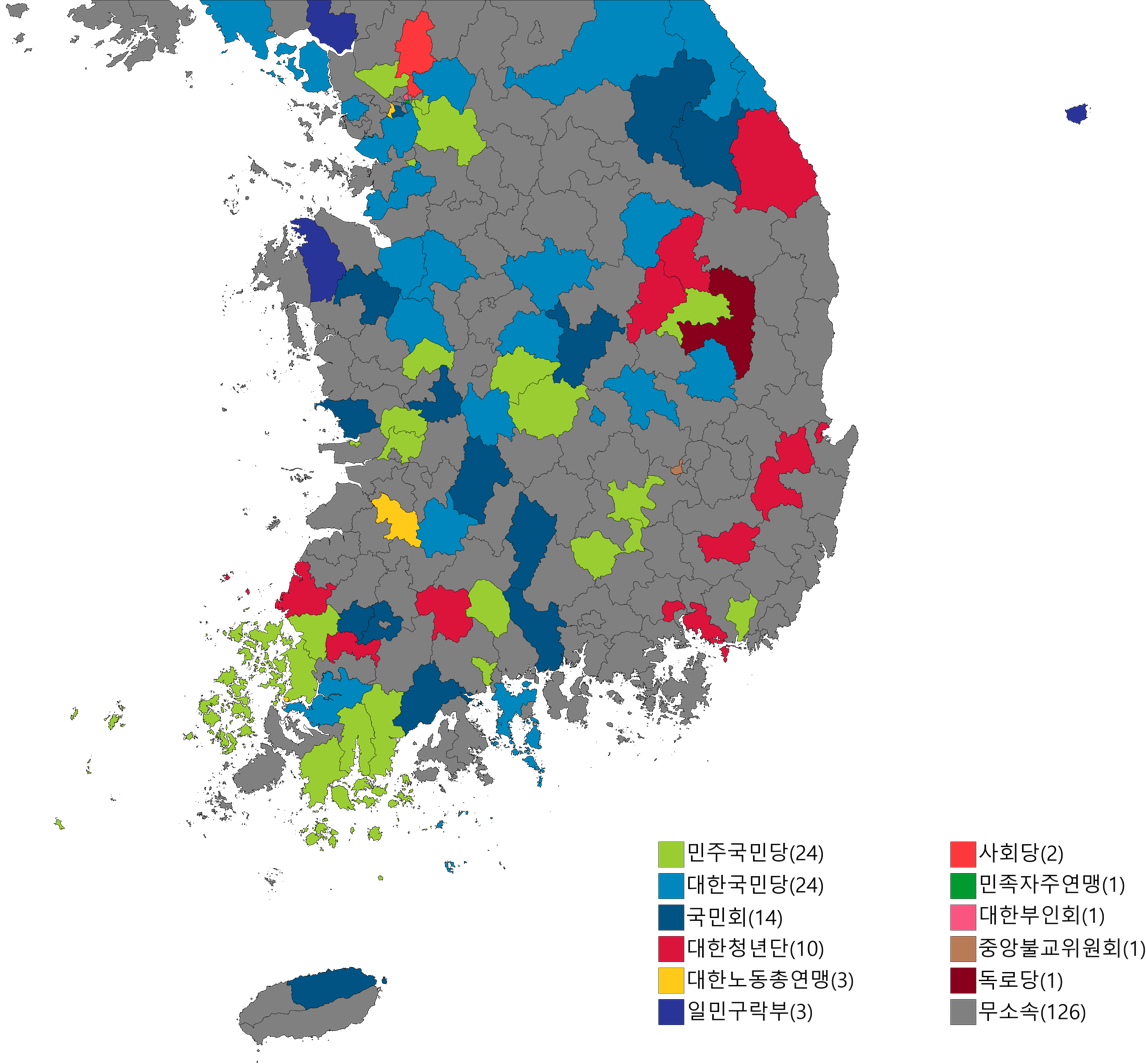
Results by constituency
Speaker before	Speaker after
Shin Ik-hee; National Association	Shin Ik-hee; National Association

Legislative elections were held in South Korea on 30 May 1950, less than a month before the invasion of the country by North Korea. The elections resulted in a tie between the Democratic Nationalist Party and the Korea Nationalist Party, which both won 24 seats, although a majority of the 210 seats were won by independents. Voter turnout was 92%.

These were the first elections to be held after South Korea declared its independence two years prior.

== Results ==
Party	Votes	%	Seats
Democratic Nationalist Party	683,910	9.79	24
Korea Nationalist Party	677,173	9.69	24
National Association	473,153	6.77	14
Korea Youth Party	227,539	3.26	10
Korean Federation of Trade Unions	117,939	1.69	3
Socialist Party	89,413	1.28	2
Ilmin Club	71,239	1.02	3
Korea Independence Workers Party	45,813	0.66	0
National Independence Federation	33,464	0.48	1
Korea Independence Party	17,745	0.25	0
Other parties	152,365	2.18	3
Independents	4,397,287	62.93	126
Total	6,987,040	100.00	210
Valid votes	6,987,040	90.13	
Invalid/blank votes	765,036	9.87	
Total votes	7,752,076	100.00	
Registered voters/turnout	8,434,737	91.91	
Source: Nohlen et al.

=== By city/province ===
Region	Total seats	Seats won									
Region	Total seats	DNP	KNP	NP	YP	FTU	SP	IC	NIF	Other	Ind.
Seoul	16	2	2	1	0	1	1	0	1	1	7
Gyeonggi	30	4	4	0	0	0	1	1	0	0	20
Gangwon	12	3	0	2	1	0	0	0	0	0	6
North Chungcheong	12	2	3	0	0	0	0	0	0	0	7
South Chungcheong	19	1	3	3	0	0	0	1	0	0	11
North Jeolla	22	3	2	0	0	1	0	0	0	1	15
South Jeolla	30	9	2	3	2	1	0	0	0	0	13
North Gyeongsang	34	2	3	1	4	0	0	1	0	1	22
South Gyeongsang	32	2	0	2	2	0	0	0	0	0	26
Jeju	3	0	0	1	0	0	0	0	0	0	2
Total	210	28	19	13	9	3	2	3	1	3	129
Source: National Election Commission

== See also ==
- List of members of the National Assembly (South Korea), 1950–1954
- Second National Assembly
