= George Sutton Patterson =

Canadian diplomat

George Sutton Patterson (1887–1953) was a Canadian missionary, diplomat and representative on UNTCOK.

Born in 1887, Patterson was vice-president and later head of the Toronto YMCA.

Patterson later served as a Methodist missionary in Japan and diplomat in Japan prior to his posting in Korea.

Patterson briefly left Japan as Chargé d'Affaires at the Canadian embassy China in October 1946.

After the United Nations General Assembly adopted the resolution on UNTCOK on 14 November, Canadian Secretary of State for External Affairs, Lester B Pearson cabled George Patterson, who at the time was posted in Tokyo, to ask him to become Canada's representative on UNTCOK. This was a heavy responsibility, particularly in light of Soviet intimation boycotting UNTCOK. Pearson was looking for a person 'who could give leadership in the work of the Commission.'

While representing Canada in Korea in 1948, the US authorities in Korea spied on Patterson. John Hodge, head of US military forces in Korea, reported to Washington that he considered Patterson a 'fellow traveler' of the communists: 'Patterson is the number one outspoken apologist for Soviet Russia and for communism that I have encountered in many months.' Given the anti-communist fervor at the time, Patterson's role as arbitrator made him an easy target for Hodge, who often butted heads with Patterson.

Patterson died of a heart attack in Boston in 1953; his widow returned to Grand Manan where they are both buried.
