= National Independence Federation =

1947–1950 political party in South Korea

National Independence Federation 민족자립연맹
- Founded: 1947
- Dissolved: 1950
- Headquarters: Seoul, South Korea
- Ideology: Liberalism (South Korean); Korean nationalism Factions: National conservatism Social democracy
- Political position: Centre-right

The National Independence Federation (KNP; Korean: 민족자주연맹; RR: Minjok jaju yeonmaeng) was a liberal political party in South Korea.

== History ==
The party was established by Kim Kyu-sik. Due to Kim's opposition to the holding of in South Korea separate to those in the north, it boycotted the 1948 Constitutional Assembly elections. It did contest the 1950 parliamentary elections, winning a single seat.

== Election results ==
=== House of Representatives ===
| Election | Leader | Votes | % | Seats | Position | Status |
|---|---|---|---|---|---|---|
| 1950 | Yun Chi-young | 33,464 | 0.48 | 1 / 210 | 9th | Opposition |
