= Yun Chi-oh =

Korean politician (1869–1950)

- Hangul: 윤치오
- Hanja: 尹致旿
- RR: Yun Chio
- MR: Yun Ch'io

Yun Chi-oh (Korean: 윤치오; Hanja: 尹致旿; 5 August 1869 – 22 December 1950) was a Korean educator and politician. He was a member of the prominent Yun family of Korea, which also included Yun Chi-ho (statesman and activist for Korean independence), Yun Chi-young, and Yun Bo-seon (South Korea's 4th President). His art name was Dongam (동암; 東庵) and his courtesy name was Jajung (자정; 子正). Yun was born in Dunpo, in Asan County, South Chungcheong Province, Joseon.

Returning to Korea after studying in Japan, Yun became a member of the Uijeongbu. While working as a state official in 1894, he became involved with the failed Kapsin Coup, for which he was exiled to Japan.

In Japan, Yun taught Korean at the Tokyo International School. He was recalled to Japan by an ambassadorial attache of the Privy Council of Korea in 1897 and went on to become a member of the Munkwanjungoso Committee, Director of Parents of the Ministry of Education, Japan Student Director, and in 1907, Chairman of the Institute of Hangul.

father of Yun Il-seon, Il-seon was early South Korean pathologist and anatomists.
