= United Nations Temporary Commission on Korea =

1947 commission to supervise elections in Korea

The United Nations Temporary Commission on Korea (UNTCOK; Korean: 유엔한국임시위원단; Hanja: UN韓國臨時委員團) was a body that oversaw elections in U.S.-controlled South Korea in May 1948.

== Background ==
After Korea was liberated from its status as a colony of the Empire of Japan at the end of World War II, the peninsula had been divided between the Soviet Civil Administration in the North and the United States Army Military Government in Korea in the South. As part of the original agreement to establish both governments, they both intended to eventually withdraw from the Korean peninsula.

== Description ==
On 14 November 1947, the commission was established via the passing of UN General Assembly Resolution 112. The mandate was to "supervise free and open elections, assist in the withdrawal of the occupying forces, and guide the new political entity to full independence".

The commission initially was composed of nine nations, and Australia, Canada and Syria played a dissenting role, resisting US plans to hold separate elections in South Korea. That position was in line with Korean moderates Kim Gu and Kim Kyu-sik.

The mandate was not able to be realized in the North. The Soviet and North Korean governments refused to recognize the commission; the Soviets argued that the commission would break the 1945 Moscow Accords. The Soviets also argued that it violated Articles 32 and 107 of the UN Charter. Article 32 requires that both sides of the dispute be consulted, but Korean representatives from North and South Korea were never invited to address the UN. Also, Article 107 denied jurisdiction to the UN over postwar settlement issues.

== See also ==
- 1948 South Korean Constitutional Assembly election – Election supervised under the commission
- United Nations Commission on Korea – Successor to the UNTCOK
- George Sutton Patterson – Canadian representative for UNTCOK
