= 1948 South Korean Constitutional Assembly election =

- 10 May 1948
- All 200 seats in the Constituent National Assembly; 101 seats needed for a majority
- Turnout: 95.50%
Party	Leader	Vote %	Seats
National Association	Syngman Rhee	25.87	55
Korea Democratic	Kim Seong-su	13.51	29
Korea Youth	Ji Cheong-cheon	9.66	12
National Youth	Lee Beom-seok	2.23	6
Taehan Labour Federation		1.57	1
Farmers Federation		0.77	2
Other parties	–	5.92	10
Independents	–	40.47	85
This lists parties that won seats. See the complete results below.
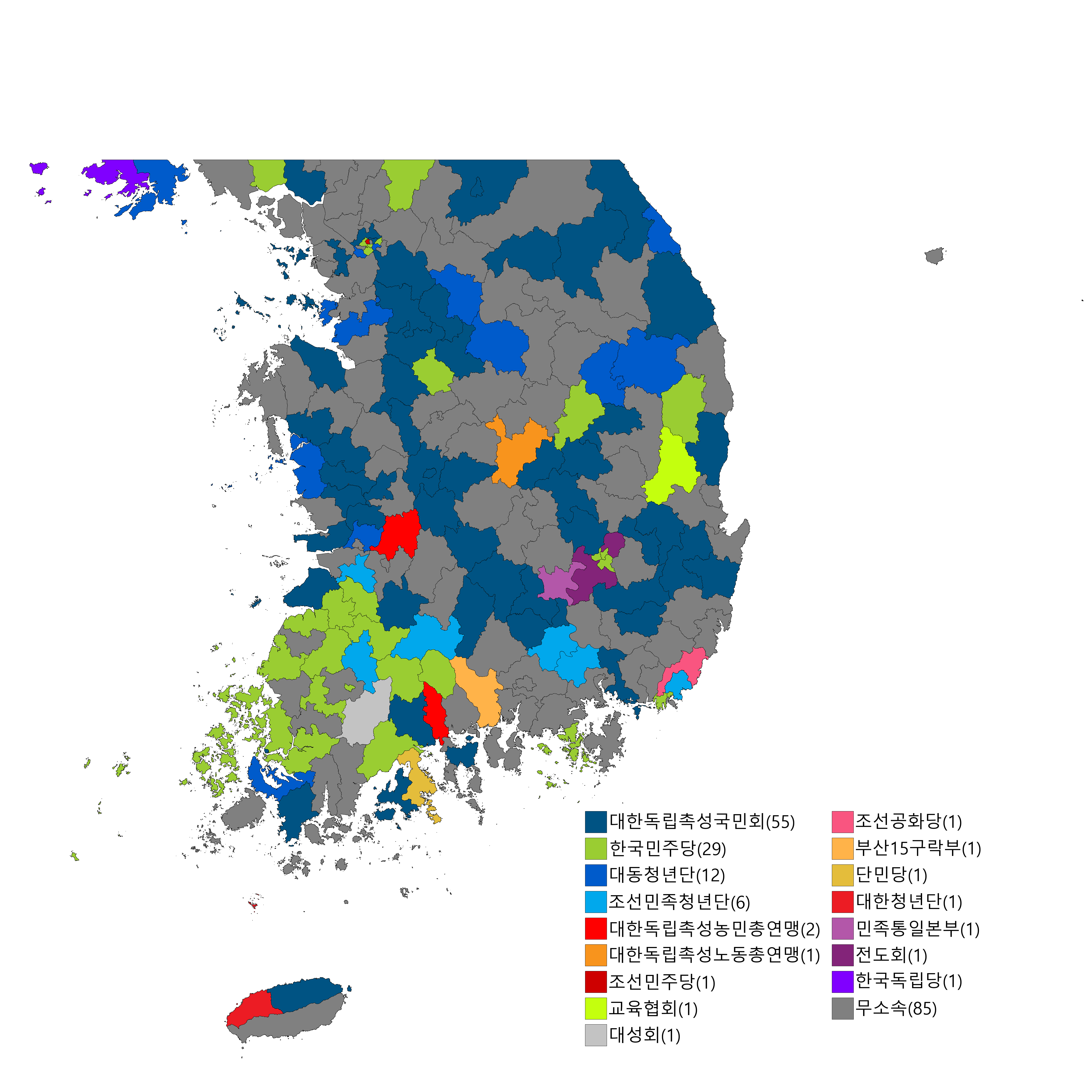
Results by constituency
Speaker before	Speaker after
None	Rhee Syng-man; National Association

Constitutional Assembly elections were held in South Korea on 10 May 1948. They were held under the U.S. military occupation, with supervision from the United Nations, and resulted in a victory for the National Association for the Rapid Realisation of Korean Independence, which won 55 of the 200 seats, although 85 were held by independents. Voter turnout was 95%.

The elections were the first time in Korean history that the citizens were allowed to vote for a national legislative body. The Korean Peninsula had been under Japanese colonial rule for thirty-five years (1910–1945), and for hundreds of years before that, it had been governed by the (Yi Dynasty) Korean royal family and scholarly officials.

== Background ==
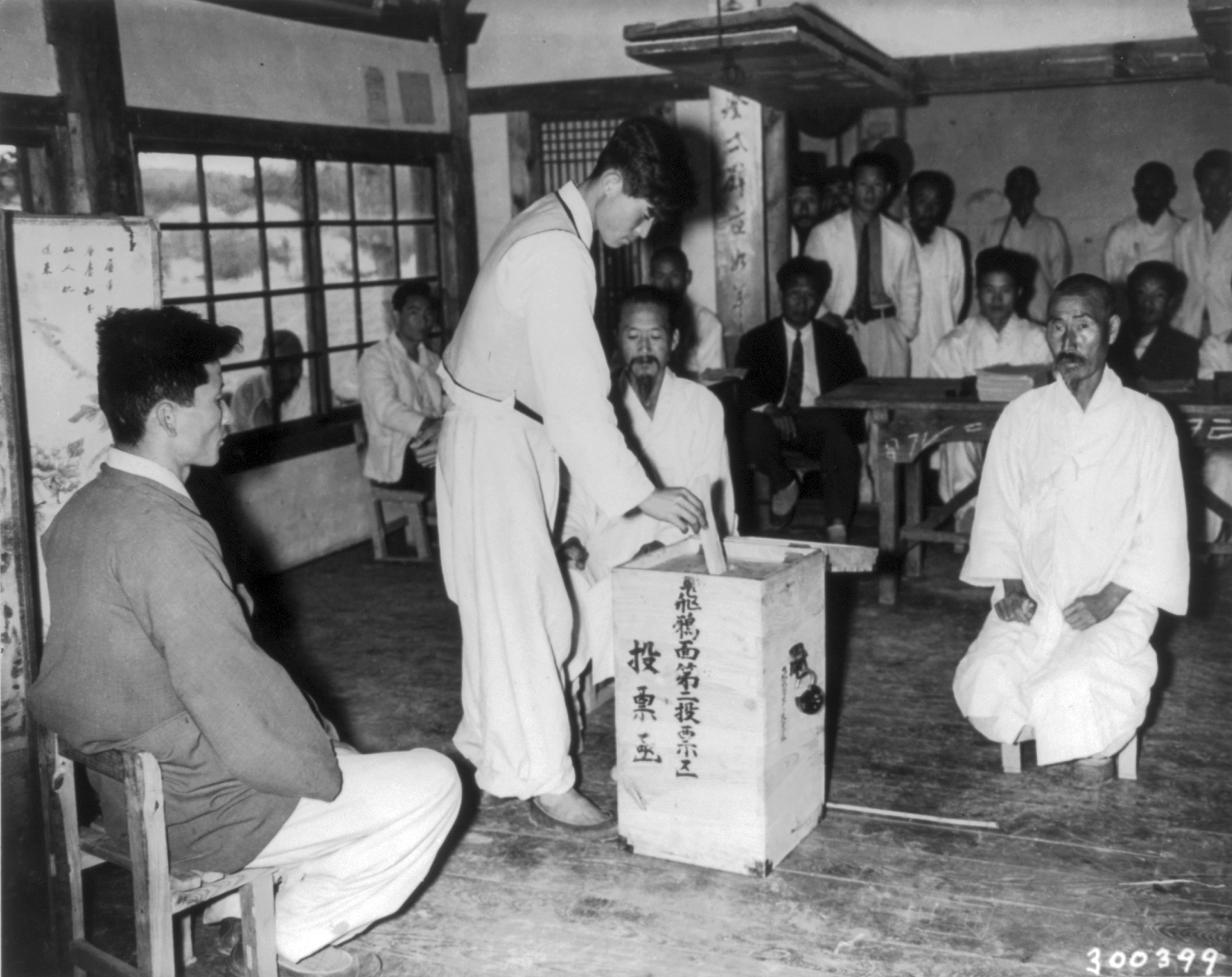
Voting in the election

The elections were a milestone in Korean political history. The Korean people had not previously experienced democracy under written constitutional rule; the very foundation of South Korean politics were still under construction and were unstable. The elections would lead to a constitution, roughly based on the constitution of the United States.

In 1948 the subject of an election of any kind in South Korea was an issue worldwide. On 8 and 9 March 1948, UN delegates from Australia, Canada, India, and Syria expressed their doubts and some complete rejection of the elections on 10 May 1948 for South Korea. The UN delegates were concerned by Korea's political maturity at the time, feeling that the elections might not validly express the popular will in a country which had only been independent for four years. Some Korean politicians, such as Kim Koo and Kim Kyu-sik, denounced the election as it would dash the hopes of reunification with North Korea. However, a vote in the South Korean Interim Legislature on 10 March ruled 40 to 0 in favor of holding the election.

The elections were originally intended to be held throughout the Korean Peninsula, but Soviet Union forces and Kim Il-sung refused the UN supervisors entry into North Korea for the elections. They were therefore held only in the US-administered territory, making the elections a purely South Korean event. Because of this, Kim Koo the last president of the Korean Provisional Government and Kim Kyu-sik the former chairman of the South Korean Interim Legislature, denounced the elections as they would dash hopes of reunification with North Korea, but could not prevent them from happening. The voters elected members of a constitutional convention, which then voted on the constitution and re-convened as the national legislature to elect the president. At the proceedings, they left one hundred seats open in the Constituent National Assembly for North Koreans to vote on when they were able.

North Korea rejected a nationwide general election based on population proportion and insisted that the election be held with equal representation between the South and the North on a 1:1 basis. South Korea had twice the population of North Korea, and anti-communist sentiment was very strong in the South.

South Korea was marred with political violence in the days preceding the election, with roughly 323 people being killed in riots or police raids, and more than 10,000 arrested.

== Electoral system ==
The right to vote was granted to all individuals aged 21 and above, regardless of gender, and those with pro-Japanese collaborationist backgrounds were deprived of their voting rights.

The election system corresponded to the same very limited system that had been established under the Japanese. In larger towns, only landowners and taxpayers could vote, while in small towns, elders voted on behalf of everyone else.

== Conduct ==
Much of the Korean Left and the Nationalist right boycotted the elections. The result was that many of those running in the election were pro-Rhee candidates. In 1946, during the elections, there were suspicions that the U.S. military government had illegally intervened to support the moderates. Because of this, many Koreans actively participated in voting. At that time, many Koreans saw communists as proxies of foreign powers because they supported trusteeship. Moreover, most independence activists were nationalists rather than communists.

The elections were marred by terrorism resulting in 600 deaths between March and May. In April, North Korea, supposedly in an effort to delay the elections, sponsored a unity conference in Pyongyang to promote reunification of the two Koreas, which both Kim Koo and Kim Kyu-sik attended. The conference was inconclusive towards any upcoming reunification, and did not delay the elections.

The people of Jeju Island saw the election as a unilateral attempt by the United States military government under the flag of United Nations to separate a southern regime and to employ its first president Syngman Rhee. The Jeju uprising occurred, during which tens of thousands of Jeju people were killed.

== Results ==
Party	Votes	%	Seats
National Association	1,755,543	25.87	55
Korea Democratic Party	916,322	13.51	29
Korea Youth Party	655,653	9.66	12
National Youth Party	151,043	2.23	6
Taehan Labour Federation	106,629	1.57	1
Farmers Federation	52,512	0.77	2
Other parties	401,554	5.92	10
Independents	2,745,483	40.47	85
Total	6,784,739	100.00	200
Valid votes	7,216,942	96.38	
Invalid/blank votes	270,707	3.62	
Total votes	7,487,649	100.00	
Registered voters/turnout	7,840,871	95.50	
Source: Nohlen et al. (Note: The official results are inconsistent, with party totals around 400,000 lower than the reported number of valid votes.)

=== Results by province or city ===
Province/City	Seats	NA	KDP	KYP	Others	IND
Seoul	10	1	4	2	1 (Note: Korean Democratic Party: 1)	2
Gyeonggi	29	7	2	3	1 (Note: Korea Independence Party: 1)	16
Gangwon	12	6		1		5
North Chungcheong	12	2	1	1		8
South Chungcheong	19	10		1		8
North Jeolla	22	6	4	1	3 (Note: National Youth Party: 2 Farmers Federation: 1)	8
South Jeolla	29	5	10	1	4 (Note: National Youth Party: 1 Farmers Federation: 1 Danmin Party: 1 Daesonghoe: 1)	9
North Gyeongsang	33	11	5	2	4 (Note: Taehan Labor Federation: 1 Education Association: 1 Jeondohoe: 1 National Unification Headquarters: 1)	11
South Gyeongsang	31	6	3		5 (Note: National Youth Party: 3 Korea Republican Party: 1 Busan 15 Club: 1)	17
Jeju	3	1			1 (Note: Taehan Youth Party: 1)	1
Total	200	55	29	12	19 (Note: National Youth Party: 6 Farmers Federation: 2 Busan 15 Club: 1 Daesonghoe: 1 Danmin Party: 1 Education Association: 1 Jeondohoe: 1 Korea Republican Party: 1 Korean Independence Party: 1 Korean Democratic Party: 1 National Unification Headquarters: 1 Taehan Labour Federation: 1 Taehan Youth Party: 1)	85
Source: National Election Commission

== Gallery ==
Turnout

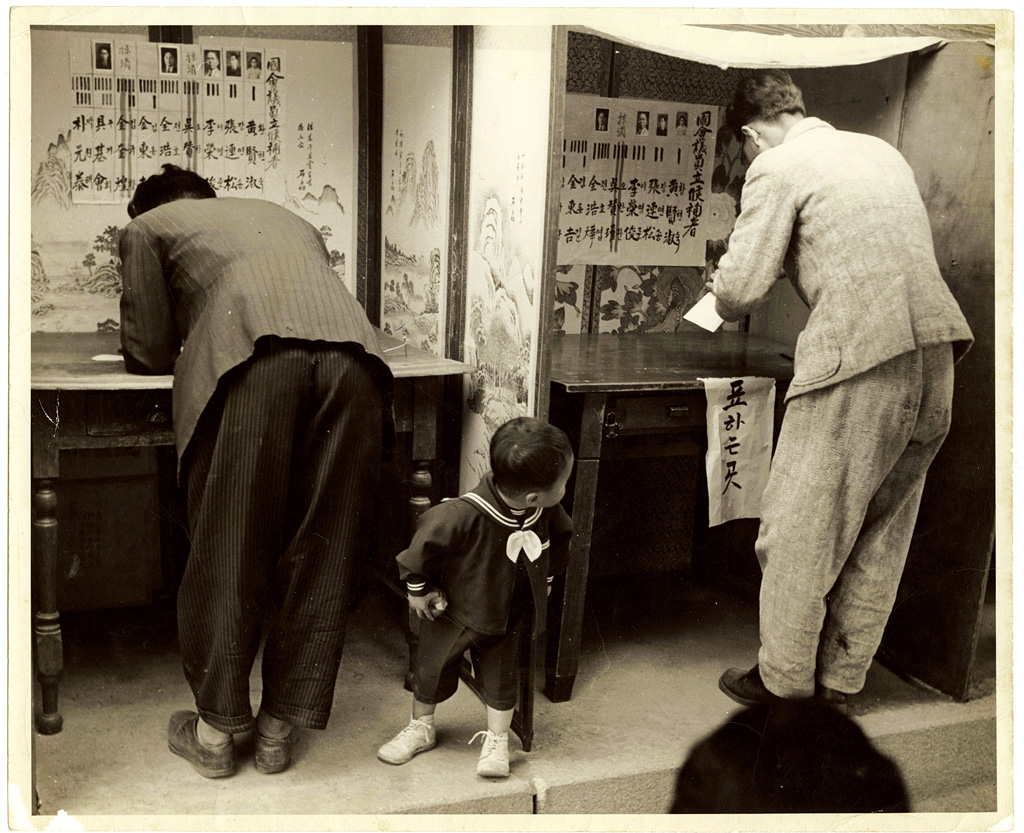

== See also ==
- List of members of the South Korean Constituent Assembly, 1948–1950
- 1946 North Korean local elections
- 1947 North Korean local elections
- People's Republic of Korea
