= 1947 North Korean local elections =

Two local elections were held in North Korea in 1947.

Village and neighborhood( 리(동) 인민위원회선거) people's committee elections were held on February 24–25 with a 99.85% voter turnout. 86.74% of the voters voted in favor of the candidates. There were 70,454 deputies in which 57.7% of the deputies represented the Workers' Party of North Korea, 7.7% represented the Korean Democratic Party, and 5.3% were in the Chondoist Chongu Party and 29.3% had no party affiliation.

Township people's committee elections (Korean: 면 인민위원회 선거; RR: Myeon Inmin-wuiwonhui Seongeo) were held on March 5, with a 99.98% voter turnout. 57.97% of the voters voted in favor of the candidates.
