= Sin Ik-hui =

Korean independence activist (1892–1956)

The Right Honourable Sin Ik-hui
- 신익희
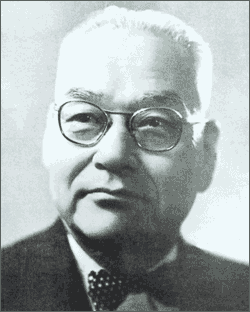
- Sin in 1952

2nd Speaker of the National Assembly
- In office August 4, 1948 – May 30, 1954
- President: Syngman Rhee
- Prime Minister: See list: Lee Beom-seok; Shin Song-mo (acting); Chang Myon; Ho Chong (acting); Yi Yun-yong (acting); Chang Taek-sang; Paik Too-chin
- Vice President: See list: Yi Si-yeong; Chang Myon (acting); Kim Seong-su; Chang Taek-sang (acting); Ham Tae-young
- Deputy: Kim Dong-won
- Preceded by: Syngman Rhee
- Succeeded by: Lee Ki-poong

1st Deputy Speaker of the National Assembly
- In office May 31, 1948 – August 3, 1948
- President: Syngman Rhee
- Prime Minister: Lee Beom-seok
- Vice President: Yi Si-yeong
- Preceded by: Position established
- Succeeded by: Kim Dong-won

Member of the National Assembly
- In office May 31, 1948 – May 5, 1956
- Constituency: Gwangju, Gyeonggi

Personal details
- Born: 9 June 1894
- Died: 5 May 1956 (aged 61)
- Party: National Association, Democratic Nationalist, Democratic Party
- Education: Waseda University

Korean name
- Hangul: 신익희
- Hanja: 申翼熙
- RR: Sin Ikhui
- MR: Sin Ikhŭi

Sin Ik-hui (Korean: 신익희; Hanja: 申翼熙; 9 June 1894 – 5 May 1956) was a Korean independence activist and politician. He was Speaker of the National Assembly during President Syngman Rhee's first term (4 August 1948 and 30 May 1950) and second term (19 June 1950 and 30 May 1954).

His nickname was Haegong (해공; 海公) or Haehu (해후; 海候) and his courtesy name was Yeogu (여구; 如耉). He also went by the name Patrick Henry Shinicky in English-language publications.

== Early life ==
Sin was born in Samaru country in Gwangju, Gyeonggi Province. He was a descendant of Sin Rip, Sin Kyung-hee, and Sin Saimdang.

He became an orphan and his second elder half-brother Sin Kyu-hee nurtured him. In his early years, he studied abroad in Japan.

== Political career ==
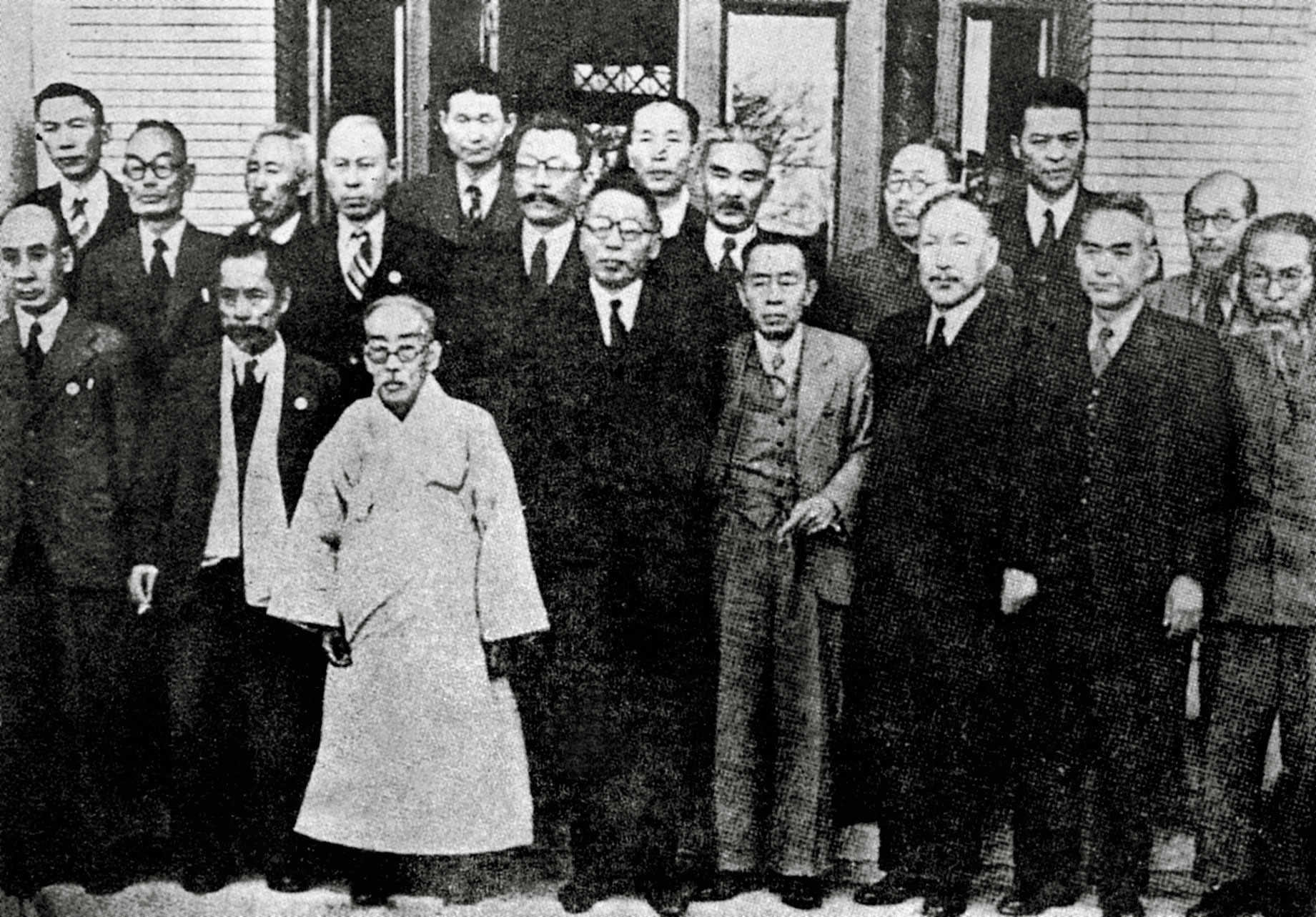
December 3, 1945. A photograph commemorating the return of the Provisional Government leaders with Sin Ik-hui included

In April 1919, he went into exile to Shanghai, China to join the Korean Provisional Government (KPG).

He was involved in the creation of the National Assembly of the KPG and was elected one of its congressmen. On 23 April 1919, he was appointed Vice Minister of Foreign Affairs.

In August 1919, Sin became Vice Minister of Justice and then Minister of Justice in the following month. In September 1920, he became Minister of Foreign Affairs. In 1930s he worked as an English professor at a Chinese University.

In May 1940, he was appointed to Provisional Government of Korea, and in 1944 he was reappointed to Interior Minister to the Provisional Government.

In May 1948, he was elected Congressman of South Korean National Assembly. On 4 August 1948 he was 2nd term head of First Republic and 19 June 1950, he again was Speaker until 30 May 1954.

In 1955, he was involved with the founding of the Democratic Party and was later elected its fourth leader. In 1956, he ran for president.

== Death ==
On 5 May 1956, Sin died of heart failure shortly before he began campaigning for president. He had boarded a train to Seoul with John Chang after the candidate registration period had closed. But minutes after taking his seat, he became violently ill and rushed to the toilet, and died shortly afterwards.

== See also ==
- Syngman Rhee
- Kim Ku
- Kim Kyu-sik
- Chang Myon
