= Korea Democratic Party =

1945–1949 South Korean political party

Korea Democratic Party 한국민주당
- Abbreviation: KDP
- Founded: 1945
- Dissolved: 1949
- Succeeded by: Democratic Nationalist Party
- Headquarters: Seoul
- Ideology: South Korean nationalism; Liberalism (South Korea); Pro-Americanism; Conservatism (de facto)
- Political position: Right-wing
- Colours: Green
- Politics of South Korea; Political parties; Elections; A: The KDP belongs to the Minjudangkye liberal party genealogy, not the pro-Rhee conservative party genealogy of South Korea, but the actual political stance at the time was right-wing conservative.

- Korea Democratic Party
- Hangul: 한국민주당
- Hanja: 韓國民主黨
- RR: Hanguk minjudang
- MR: Han'guk minjudang

The Korea Democratic Party (KDP; Korean: 한국민주당) was the leading opposition party in the first years of the First Republic of Korea. It existed from 1945 to 1949, when it merged with other opposition parties.

The U.S. military government considered the KDP a conservative group with high educational standards, and believed they sought to establish a Western-style democracy in Korea. However, modern South Korean political academia recognizes them as South Korea's first liberal party. Viewed as a party of the right, the character of the KDP was anti-communist, Confucian-conservative, and economically liberal.

== History ==
The KDP was established in 1945 by conservative nationalists headed by Song Jin-woo who were opposed to the People's Republic of Korea government set up by Lyuh Woon-hyung, instead backing the Provisional Government of the Republic of Korea. After Song was assassinated later in the year, he was succeeded as leader by Kim Seong-su. The Democratic Party won a third of the seats in the Interim Legislative Assembly elections in October 1946, and although it opposed the Assembly's existence due to some of its leadership being excluded, the party provided several of the key figures in the interim administration.

However, its closeness to the American occupation force, together with its association with the landed gentry, meant that it never gained significant popular support. In the May 1948 elections the party won only 29 of the 200 seats, and although it supported Syngman Rhee in the July 1948 presidential elections, none of its members were included in his cabinet, a snub that led to the party joining the opposition.

On 10 February 1949, it merged with other groups in the legislature to form the Democratic Nationalist Party.

== Electoral results ==
Election	Leader	Votes	%	Seats	Position	Status
1948	Kim Seong-su	916,322	13.51	29 / 200	2nd	Opposition

== See also ==
- Song Jin-woo (journalist)
