= Lee Ki-poong =

(1896–1960) South Korean politician and Vice President

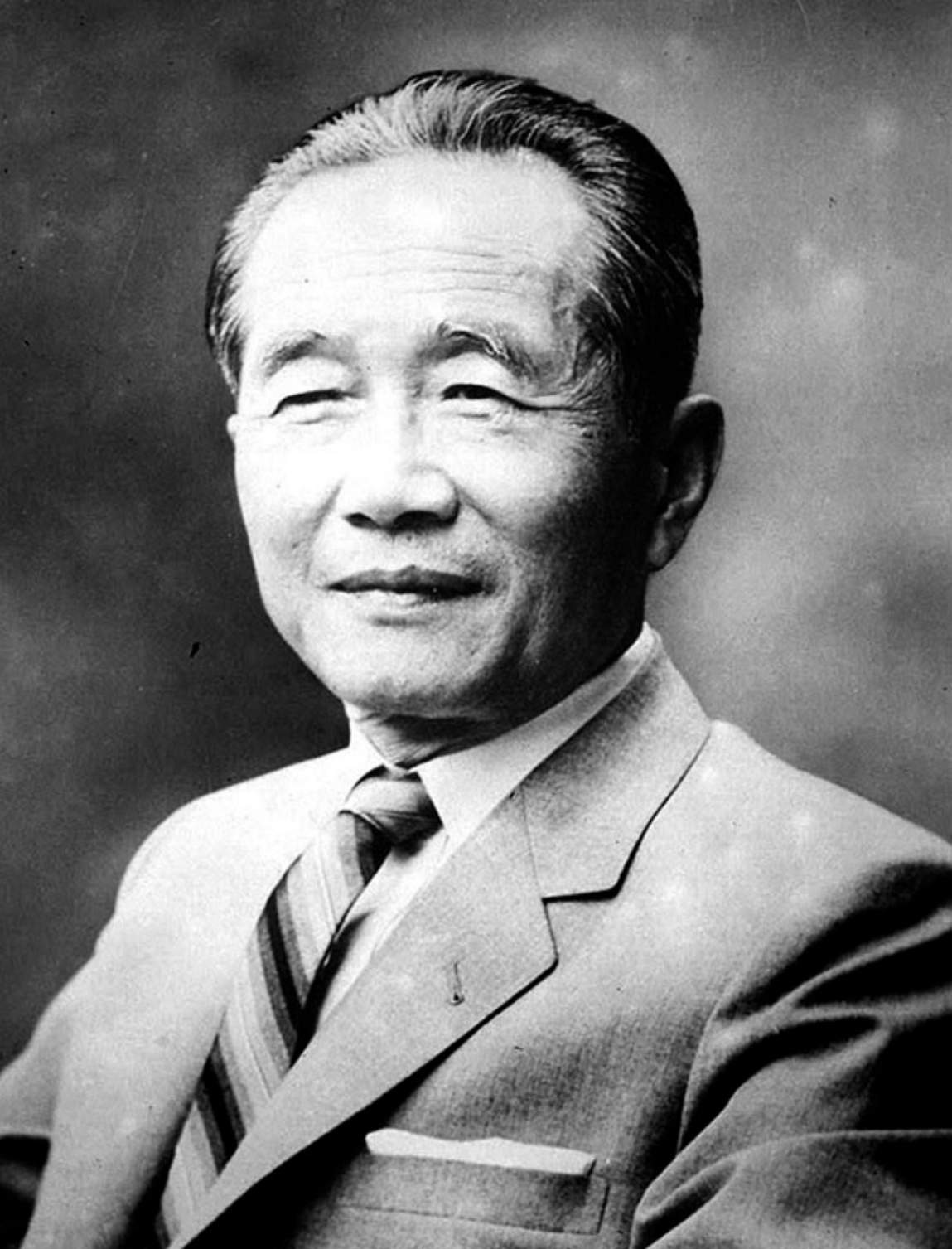
- Official portrait, 1959

1st Chief of Staff to the President
- In office April 15, 1948 – October 1948
- President: Syngman Rhee
- Prime Minister: Lee Beom-seok
- Vice President: Yi Si-yeong
- Preceded by: Position established
- Succeeded by: Kim Yang-cheon

3rd & 4th Mayor of Seoul
- In office June 6, 1949 – August 14, 1949
- President: Syngman Rhee
- Prime Minister: Lee Beom-seok
- Vice President: Yi Si-yeong
- Preceded by: Yun Bo-seon
- Succeeded by: Himself
- In office August 15, 1949 – May 8, 1951
- President: Syngman Rhee
- Prime Minister: Lee Beom-seok; Shin Song-mo (acting); Chang Myon
- Vice President: Yi Si-yeong
- Preceded by: Himself
- Succeeded by: Kim Tai Sun

3rd Minister of National Defense
- In office May 7, 1951 – March 29, 1952
- President: Syngman Rhee
- Prime Minister: Ho Chong (acting)
- Vice President: Yi Si-yeong; Chang Myon (acting); Kim Seong-su
- Preceded by: Shin Song-mo
- Succeeded by: Shin Tae-young

3rd Speaker of the National Assembly
- In office June 9, 1954 – absent from April 25, 1960; April 28, 1960
- President: Syngman Rhee
- Prime Minister: Paik Too-chin; Pyon Yong-tae; Baek Han-seong (acting); Position abolished (November 28, 1954 – April 25, 1960); Ho Chong (acting)
- Vice President: Ham Tae-young; Chang Myon
- Deputy: See list: Choe Sun-ju; Kwak Sang-hoon; Jo Gyeong-gyu; Hwang Seong-su; Lee Jae-hak; Han Hui-seok; Lee Jae-hak
- Preceded by: Shin Ik-hee
- Succeeded by: Kwak Sang-hoon

Personal details
- Born: December 20, 1896 Goesan County, North Chungcheong Province, Joseon
- Died: April 28, 1960 (aged 63) Gyeongmudae or Ihwajang, Seoul, South Korea
- Cause of death: Assassination by shooting
- Party: Liberal
- Spouse: Park Maria
- Relations: Grand Prince Hyoryŏng (17th-gen ancestor); Yi Hoe-jeong (great-grandfather)
- Children: 4: 1 posthumously adoptive (이강복) Lee Kang-bok, 1 died at a young age (이강희) Lee Kang-hee and; 2 committed suicide (이강석 / 이강욱) Lee Kang-seok and Lee Kang-wook
- Parent(s): 이낙의 Lee Nak-ui and 송정현 Song Jeong-hyeon
- Education: Tabor College (Iowa)
- Occupation: Politician

Korean name
- Hangul: 이기붕
- Hanja: 李起鵬
- RR: I Gibung
- MR: I Kibung

Art name
- Hangul: 만송
- Hanja: 晚松
- RR: Mansong
- MR: Mansong
- Clan: Jeonju Yi clan

Lee Ki-poong [also spelled as Yi Ki-bong or Lee Gi-bung] (Korean: 이기붕; 20 December 1896 – 28 April 1960) was a South Korean politician, Vice Presidential candidate, Minister of Defense, Speaker of the Assembly and Mayor of Seoul.

== Biography ==
=== Early life and education ===
As a member of the Jeonju Yi clan, Lee had a claim of nobility; however, he and his family found themselves impoverished due to the Japanese occupation of Korea. Because of the occupation, Lee had to save enough currency to travel to the United States. He struggled for about six years after high school, but eventually made it and entered the now-defunct Tabor College in 1924. Seeing that his funds were rapidly decreasing, Lee traveled to New York seeking menial jobs; during his time in New York, Lee met Syngman Rhee. Disaffected by his conditions in 1935, Lee moved home to find his parents in poor health. Back in Korea, Lee met Park Maria, who was studying at missionary schools.

=== Political career ===
Lee started his journey in earnest by becoming Mayor of Seoul from June 1949 to May 1951 then serving as leader of the Liberal Party from 1954 to 1960 during which he was also serving as Speaker of the assembly. As a patron of sports Lee was elected to be President of the Korean Sport & Olympic Committee in 1952, later on he was co-opted onto the IOC in June 1955 and served in this capacity until his assassination. By the 1956 election, Lee became the most prominent member of the Liberal Party, and was considered one of Rhee's closest and most powerful right-hand men, however, this failure had caused the Liberal Party to panic, especially so when Cho Pong-am received 2 million votes in said election, as seemingly Rhee's popularity did not translate to electoral victory of his designated successor.

=== As Minister of Defense ===
Lee started his service towards Korea by becoming Minister of National Defense from May 1951 to March 1952 (during which Lee presented a proposal to enhance the capabilities of the South Korean army). On August 10, 1951, as then Defense Minister he condemned the Geochang massacre which was perpetrated by Korean soldiers and vowed severe punishment to those responsible. Lee, in being put in the position of MoNT was a firm supporter of President Syngman Rhee though as time had passed, Rhee had grown weary of Lee, which led him to dismiss him from the position of Defense Minister on March 29, 1952.

=== The 1960 Election ===
Lee was elected Vice President of South Korea in the controversial March 1960 presidential election. (Note: Prior to the student movement which the election resulted in, Lee was already disliked by the public for placing secretaries, advisers, and friends at positions of power around the aging Syngman Rhee. Due to his age, Rhee overly relied upon his protege—and by extension Lee's proxies, in particular a man named Park Chan-il who was an "agent" of Lee.) In said election Rhee had sought his fourth term as President of South Korea. Both won by a very wide margin, and the election was widely condemned in South Korea for election rigging amid growing public opposition to Rhee's corrupt and authoritarian rule, including the deployment of Police forces to stem the potential anger of the citizenry. As a result, the April Revolution took place in mid-April 1960, which resulted in Rhee resigning on April 27, 1960, and fleeing the country. Lee resigned before taking office as vice president elect, but the results of the March election were invalidated due to alleged election fraud and the office itself was later abolished in June.

=== Death ===
Seemingly during the whole ordeal of the April Revolution Lee had suffered from a case of "creeping paralysis" which was used to explain his inability of assuming the role of Vice President, also Lee had been presumed to be missing from the night of April 25. In the early hours [around 4:30 / 5:45 AM] of April 28, 1960, in a "heavily guarded" annex of Rhee's Seoul mansion, Lee and his family were shot and killed by his eldest son, Army 2nd Lieutenant Lee Kang-seok (adopted by Syngman Rhee in 1956 or 1958), who remarked "Let's apologize through death.", with his personal, M1911A1 .45 caliber automatic handgun, who then killed himself in a murder–suicide which he had planned two days previously.

== See also ==
- April Revolution
- Kim Chang-ryong another of Rhee's "trusted" right-hand men
- Imo Incident
- Liberal Party (South Korea)
- First Republic of Korea
- Syngman Rhee

== Footnotes ==
Political offices
Preceded by Yun Posun	3rd Mayor of Seoul; June 6, 1949 – August 14, 1949	Succeeded by Himself
Preceded by Himself	4th Mayor of Seoul; August 15, 1949 – May 8, 1951	Succeeded by Kim Tai Sun
Preceded by Shin Sung-mo	3rd Minister of National Defense; May 7, 1951 – March 29, 1952	Succeeded by Shin Tae-young
Preceded by Shin Ik-hee	3rd Speaker of the National Assembly; June 9, 1954 – April 28, 1960	Succeeded by Kwak Sang-hoon
