= Liberal Party (South Korea) =

1951–1970 political party in South Korea

Liberal Party (Note: The name is sometimes translated as Liberty Party, or Freedom Party. In South Korea, the terms "liberal", "liberty", and "freedom" all tend to be translated as Jayu (Korean: 자유; Hanja: 自由).) 자유당 自由黨
- Leader: Lee Jae-hak (politician)
- Founder: Syngman Rhee
- Founded: 17 December 1951 (first iteration); 7 September 1963 (second iteration)
- Dissolved: 16 May 1961 (first iteration); 24 January 1970 (second iteration)
- Preceded by: Korean National Youth Association (de facto); National Association (Note: 1960); Korean Federation of Labor; Peasant Federation; Korean Council of Wives
- Merged into: New Democratic
- Headquarters: Seoul, South Korea
- Ideology: Ilminism; Conservatism (South Korean); Korean nationalism; Fascism (until 1952) (disputed); Anti-communism
- Political position: Far-right
- Colours: Dark blue (Note: First iteration.); Dark green (Note: Second iteration.)

The Liberal Party (Korean: 자유당; Hanja: 自由黨; RR: Jayudang) was a far-right corporatist and anti-communist political party in South Korea established in 1951 by Syngman Rhee.

== History ==
Logo of the second iteration of the party

As the 1952 presidential elections neared, Rhee made public his intention to organize a party during his August 15 Speech in 1951. Rhee called Lee Beom-seok, then the ambassador in China, and charged him with creating the Liberal Party. Lee used the strong organizational base of "Korean National Youth Association" (조선민족청년단) as a starting point and incorporated the major five organizations: "National Association for the Rapid Realisation of Korean Independence" (대한독립촉성국민회), "Korean Federation of Labor" (대한노동조합총연맹), "Peasant Federation" (농민조합연맹), and "Korean Council of Wives" (대한부인회) as temporary sub-organizations under the Liberal Party.

== Ideology ==
Although the Liberal Party name is used, it is not the traditional definition as used in the West. For example, the Liberal Party advocated for Ilminism and viewed Western-style liberalism and individualism negatively, instead suggesting the need for "Korean-style liberal democracy". One of the main values of Ilminism was the Hongik Ingan, based on traditional conservatism, and the Students Protection Corps, which is said to be similar to Hitlerjugend. To this day, liberal democracy (자유민주주의) in South Korea is still used in a similar sense to "anti-communist system" or "free world against communism" by the conservative camp of South Korea, rather than the same meaning as Western liberal democracy.

As its national values during its reign, the Liberal Party put forward "anti-communist and anti-Japanese" (반공 반일; 反共反日) sentiments. At the same time, the Liberal Party showed a very pro-American tendency, so it was closer to right-wing populism than resistance nationalism. The Liberal Party supported a discriminatory policy against hwagyo (화교; 華僑) based on Korean ethnic supremacy and anti-PRC sentiment.

== Election results ==
=== President ===
Election	Candidate	Votes	%	Result
1952	Syngman Rhee	5,238,769	74.62	Elected
1956	Syngman Rhee	5,046,437	69.99	Elected
March 1960	Syngman Rhee	9,633,376	100	Elected

=== Vice President ===
Election	Candidate	Votes	%	Result
1952	Lee Beom-seok	1,815,692	25.45	Not elected
1956	Lee Ki-poong	3,805,502	44.03	Not elected
March 1960	Lee Ki-poong	8,337,059	79.19	Elected

=== Legislature ===
==== House of Representatives ====
Election	Leader	Votes	%	Seats				Position	Status
Election	Leader	Votes	%	Constituency	Party list	Total	+/–	Position	Status
1954	Syngman Rhee	2,756,081	36.79			114 / 203	new	1st	Government
1958	Syngman Rhee	3,607,092	42.07			127 / 233	▲13	1st	Government
1960	Cho Gyeong-gyu	249,960	2.75			2 / 233	▼125	3rd	Opposition
1963	Chang Taek-sang	271,820	2.92	0 / 134	0 / 44	0 / 175	▼2	7th	Extra-parliamentary
1967	Lee Jae-hak	393,448	3.62	0 / 134	0 / 44	0 / 175	Steady	3rd	Extra-parliamentary

==== House of Councillors ====
Election	Leader	Votes	%	Seats	Position	Status
1960	Cho Gyeong-gyu	653,748	6.12	4 / 58	2nd	Opposition
