= Korea Nationalist Party =

1948–1958 political party in South Korea

Korea Nationalist Party 대한국민당 大韓國民黨
- Founded: November 11, 1948 (Note: first iteration); November 11, 1949 (Note: second iteration)
- Dissolved: March 1949; February 1958
- Headquarters: Seoul, South Korea
- Ideology: Tridemism (de jure)
- Colors: Blue; Green

The Korea Nationalist Party (KNP; Korean: 대한국민당; Hanja: 大韓國民黨; RR: Daehangungmindang) was a political party in South Korea.

== History ==
The party was established towards the end of 1949 by a group of 71 MPs led by Yun Chi-young. In the 1950 parliamentary elections it received 9.7% of the vote and won 24 seats, emerging as the joint-largest party with the Democratic Nationalist Party. In the next elections in 1954 it was reduced to only three seats.

Yun was the KNP candidate for the vice-presidency in the 1956 elections, receiving only 2.8% of the vote. The party lost parliamentary representation in the 1958 elections

== Election results ==
=== Vice President ===
Election	Candidate	Votes	%	Result
1956	Yun Chi-young	241,278	2.79	Not elected

=== House of Representatives ===
Election	Leader	Votes	%	Seats	+/–	Position	Status
1950	Yun Chi-young	677,173	9.69	24 / 210	new	2nd	Opposition
1954	Sin Ik-hui	72,923	0.97	3 / 203	▼21	4th	Opposition
