= National Association (South Korea) =

1946–1960 political party in South Korea

National Association 국민회 國民會
- Founders: Syngman Rhee, Kim Ku
- Founded: 1946
- Dissolved: 1960
- Merged into: Liberal Party
- Headquarters: Seoul
- Ideology: Conservatism (South Korean)
- Political position: Right-wing to far-right

The National Association (Korean: 국민회; Hanja: 國民會) was a political party in South Korea. This political party advocated accelerating the national independence, opposing trusteeship, and rejecting the division along the 38th parallel.

== History ==
Syngman Rhee established the Central Committee for the Rapid Realisation of Korean Independence in October 1945, shortly after he had returned from exile. As a result of widespread opposition to the Moscow Conference, the Committee gained the backing of the leaders of the provisional government and several political parties, including the Korea Democratic Party, the Korean Independence Party and a faction of the Communist Party.

The Communist Party faction later withdrew its support, but the others involved formed the Central Council for the Rapid Realization of Korean Independence (CCRRKI) on 8 February 1946. The new party opposed the proposed trusteeship, but when Rhee called for separate elections to be held in South Korea, President Kim Ku and others left the party. In the 1948 elections it won 55 of the 200 seats, emerging as the largest party.

The party was subsequently renamed the "National Association". In the 1950 elections it was reduced to 14 seats, finishing third behind the Democratic Nationalist Party and the Korea Nationalist Party. In 1951 Rhee established the Liberal Party. However, the National Association remained extant until the end of his presidency in 1960. It won three seats in the 1954 elections, but lost parliamentary representation in the 1958 elections.

== Election results ==
=== President ===
Election	Candidate	Votes	%	Result
1948	Syngman Rhee	180	92.31	Elected
1956	Syngman Rhee	5,046,437	69.99	Elected
1960	Syngman Rhee	9,633,376	100	Elected

=== Vice-President ===
Election	Candidate	First round		Second round		Result
Election	Candidate	Votes	%	Votes	%	Result
1948	Yi Si-yeong	113	57.36	133	67.86	Elected

=== Constitutional Assembly ===
Election	Leader	Votes	%	Seats	Status
1948	Syngman Rhee	1,755,543	25.87	55 / 200	Government

=== House of Representatives ===
Election	Leader	Votes	%	Seats	+/–	Position	Status
1950	Syngman Rhee	473,153	6.77	14 / 210	new	3rd	Opposition
1954	Syngman Rhee	192,109	2.56	3 / 203	▼11	3rd	Opposition
1958	Syngman Rhee	50,568	0.59	0 / 233	▼3	4th	Extra-parliamentary
