= Kim Kyu-sik =

Korean politician (1881–1950)

The Right Honourable Kim Kyu-sik 김규식 金奎植
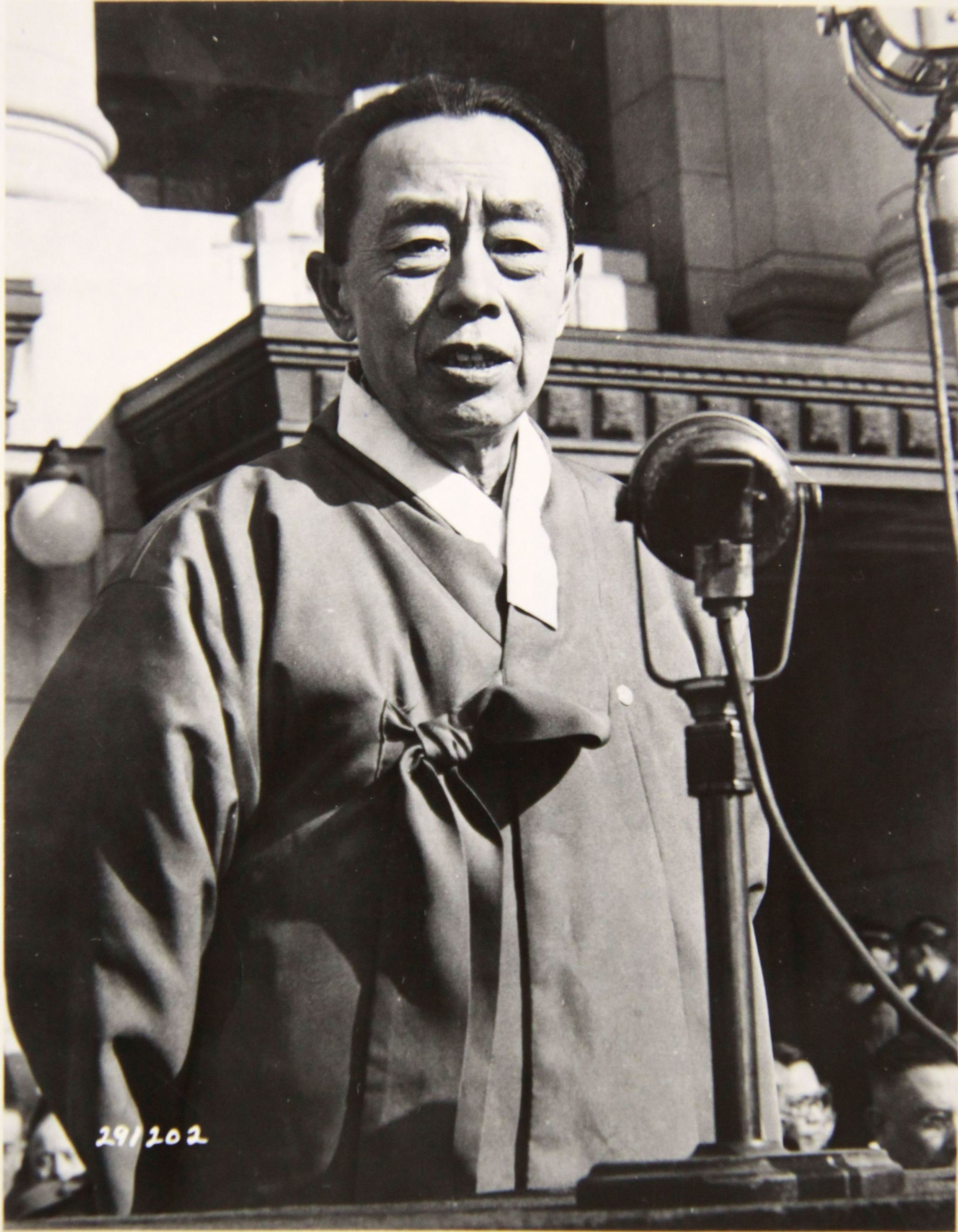
- Kim in 1946

Vice President of the Provisional Government of the Republic of Korea
- In office October 1940 – 3 March 1947
- Governor: John R. Hodge
- Preceded by: Kim Ku
- Succeeded by: Syngman Rhee

Personal details
- Born: January 29, 1881 Dongrae District, Busan, Joseon
- Died: December 10, 1950 (aged 69) Manpo, Chagang-do, North Korea
- Education: Roanoke College
- Religion: Presbyterianism

Korean name
- Hangul: 김규식
- Hanja: 金奎植
- RR: Gim Gyusik
- MR: Kim Kyusik

Art name
- Hangul: 우사, 죽적
- Hanja: 尤史, 竹笛
- RR: Usa, Jukjeok
- MR: Usa, Chukchŏk

Courtesy name
- Hangul: 변갑
- RR: Byeongap
- MR: Pyŏn'gap

Kim Kyu-sik (Korean: 김규식; Hanja: 金奎植, January 29, 1881 – December 10, 1950), also spelled Kimm Kiusic, was a Korean politician and academic during the Korean independence movement and a leader of the Provisional Government of the Republic of Korea. Kim served in various roles in the provisional government, including as foreign minister, ambassador, education minister and finally as the vice president from 1940 until the provisional government's dissolution on March 3, 1947. Kim's art names included Usa (우사), Kummun (금문), Kimsong (김성), and Chukchok (죽적).

== Life and career ==
=== Early life ===
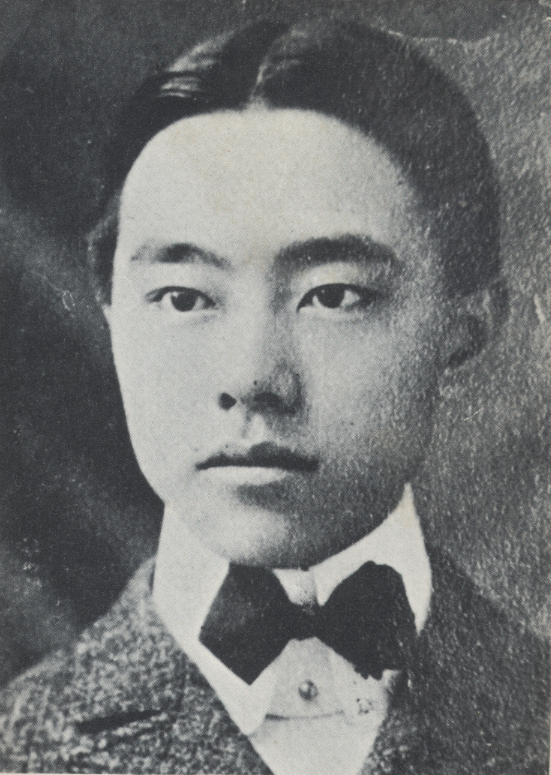
Kim Kyu-sik (1890s)

Kim was born in Dongnae, now part of modern-day Busan. Orphaned at an early age, Kim studied with American missionary H.G. Underwood starting from the age of 6, taking the Christian name "Johann". He later traveled to the United States, receiving a bachelor's degree from Roanoke College in 1903 and a master's degree in English literature from Princeton University the following year.

In 1905 Kim returned to Korea, teaching widely. Following the 1910 Japanese annexation of Korea Kim fled to China in 1913.

=== Provisional Government of the Republic of Korea ===
In 1919 Kim traveled to Paris for the Paris Peace Conference to lobby for Korean independence from Japan. He was sent by Lyuh Woon-Hyung and Chang Duk-soo, who had organized Sinhan Cheongnyeondang in Shanghai in the summer of 1919. His efforts in Paris proved to be futile.

The Korean National Revolutionary Party was formed in Shanghai in 1935 through a grouping of nationalist Korean parties. The organizers were Kim Kyu-sik, Kim Won-bong and Cho Soang.

Kim was a leading member of the Provisional Government of the Republic of Korea based in Shanghai, becoming the Vice-President. He was fluent in English and taught English to the Provisional Government's members.

=== After Korean Liberation ===
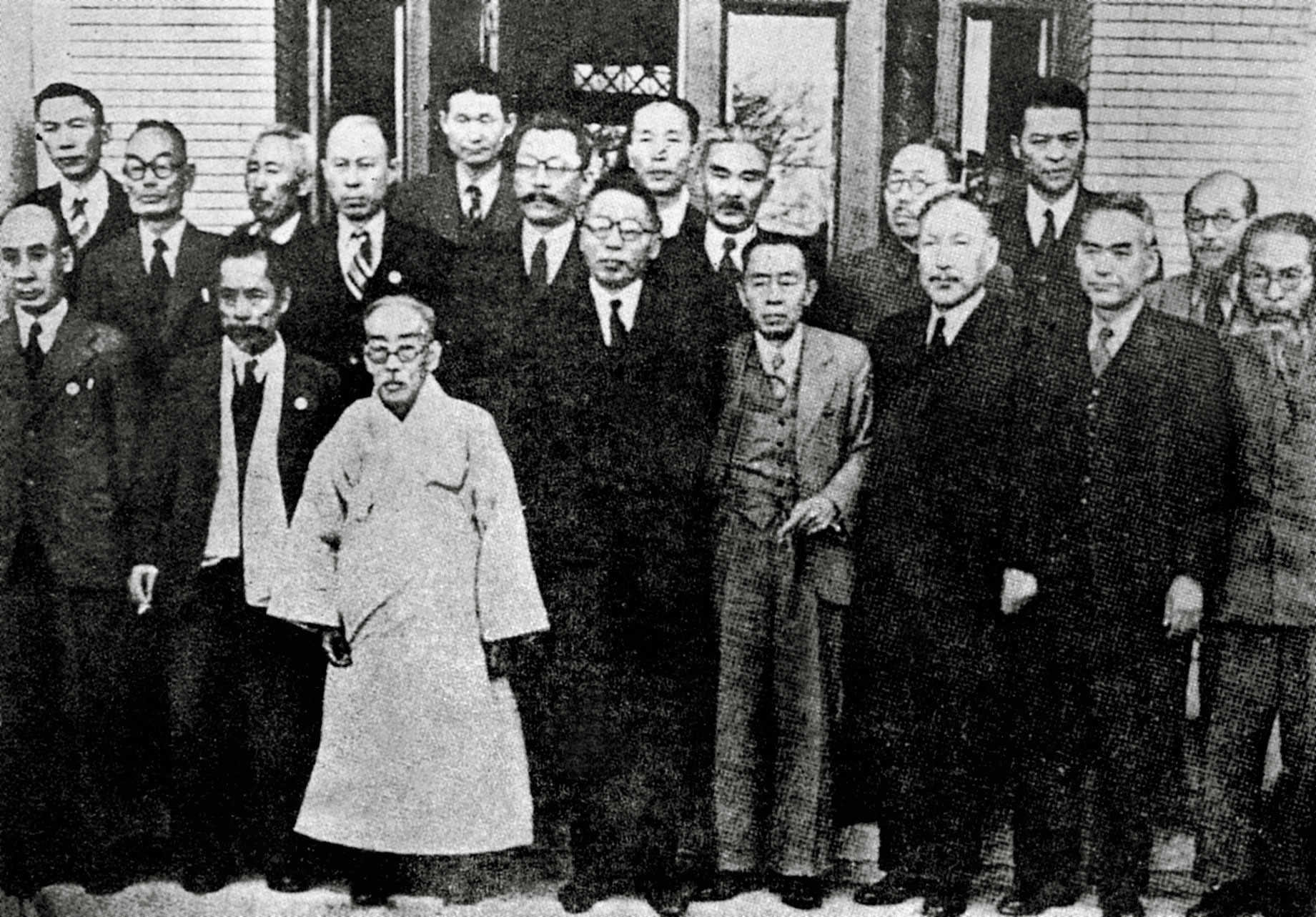
December 3, 1945. A photograph commemorating the return of the Provisional Government leaders with Kim Kyu-sik included

After the post-World War II liberation of Korea in 1945, he returned to his homeland to join in the formation of a newly independent state, which was then under the rule of the United States Army Military Government in Korea in the south and the Soviet Civil Authority in the north. Kim was favored by the American occupation leader John R. Hodge, who saw him and Lyuh Woon-Hyung as moderate leaders on the right and left, respectively. In September 1947, the United States and Syngman Rhee et al. pushed to move the Korean question to the newly created United Nations, which voted to allow for elections in the south despite the objections of southern nationalists such as Kim Kyu-sik and Kim Ku as well as from the Provisional People's Committee of North Korea, who were opposed because of the non-participation of the North.

=== Death ===
After failed efforts to broker reunification in that year, he retired from politics. After the outbreak of the Korean War in 1950, he was kidnapped and taken to the North; he reportedly died near Manpo in the far north on December 10.

CIA documents in 1951 reported that Kim had been among those specially kept in Manchuria, and, citing the Minju Sinbo, reported that he and many other prominent South Korean prisoners who had been moved to the newly created Chagang province were still alive before December 1950. The agency placed Kim and Ahn Chai-hong in the camp of “moderate” political detainees. On 18 June 1951, the CIA confirmed that Kim Kyu-sik had passed away from disease.

In May 1988 he was posthumously awarded the Republic of Korea Medal of Order of Merit for National Foundation, the most prestigious civil decoration in South Korea. He was posthumously awarded North Korea's National Reunification Prize in 1998.

== Other information ==
Educational career

- December 17, 1913 in Shanghai, a professor of Barkdal English School
- 1923 professor of English at Fudan University
- 1927–1929 In Tianjin, Northern Sea University Professor of English
- 1932–1937 Nanjing political instructor School, professor of political.
- 1937–1940 ShChwan College Professor of English Literature, Foreign Languages and Chair, Head of Foreign Language and Literature

Books

- Poems, 《Yangjayugyong》(양자유경)
- 《Small English grammar》
- 《Practical English》
- 《Elizabeth I Age's Introduction to Theatre》
- 《WonYongSa》

Degrees

- 1903 Roanoke College(Bachelor of Arts)
- 1904 Master of English Literature(MA) at Princeton University
- 1923 Honorary Doctor of Law Roanoke College

Awards and recognition

- Order of Merit for National Foundation (1988)
- National Reunification Prize (1988)

== Popular culture ==
- Portrayed by actor Lee Mug-won in the 1981―82 TV series, 1st Republic.

== See also ==
- Korea under Japanese rule
- PGOTROK
- USAMGIK
- Kim Seong-su
- Pak Hon-yong

== Notes ==
Political offices
Preceded by Ryu Dong-ryeol	Vice Presidents of Provisional Government of the Republic of Korea; 1940–1948	Succeeded by Provisional Government dissolved
