= Yun Chi-young =

South Korean politician (1898–1996)

- Yun in 1948

1st Minister of Home Affairs
- In office August 15, 1948 – December 15, 1948
- President: Syngman Rhee
- Preceded by: Position established
- Succeeded by: Shin Sung-mo

13th Mayor of Seoul
- In office December 17, 1963 – March 30, 1966
- President: Park Chung-Hee
- Prime Minister: Choi Tu-son; Chung Il-kwon
- Preceded by: Yoon Taeil
- Succeeded by: Kim Hyun-ok

Personal details
- Born: 10 February 1898 Seoul, Joseon
- Died: 9 February 1996 (aged 97) Seoul, South Korea
- Party: Korea Nationalist Party (1948–1958)
- Spouse(s): Lee Byung-young(1907–1923); Lee Eun-Hye (1924–1980)
- Education: Waseda University

Korean name
- Hangul: 윤치영
- Hanja: 尹致暎
- RR: Yun Chiyeong
- MR: Yun Ch'iyŏng

Yun Chi-young (Korean: 윤치영; 10 February 1898 – 9 February 1996) was a Korean independence activist, journalist, and politician, diplomat of South Korea. He was the first Interior Minister (1948), the 2nd South Korean Ambassador to France from 1950 to 1951, a member of the 1st, 2nd and 3rd National Assemblies of South Korea, and the 13th Mayor of Seoul from 1963 to 1966. His art name is Dongsan (Korean: 동산).

He was Yun Posun's younger half-uncle, and politician and independence activist Yun Chi-ho's younger cousin. Yun Posun is his second brother, and he is Yun Chi-so's son.

== Biography ==
He was the half-uncle of Yun Posun, second President of South Korea. Yun had long time to Entourage and secretary of Syngman Rhee, first president of South Korea. His goal was to help collect Syngman Rhee's independent Activities. He was an extreme anti-Japanese activist and a political messiah worship.

After resigning, he was secretary of Syngman Rhee. From August 1948 to December 1948, he was Interior Minister of South Korea and Ambassador to UN Dispatch. From 1951, he was the 2nd Ambassador of the Republic of Korea in France (주프랑스 한국 공사) to 1952.

From 1948 to 1956, he lost to Lee Ki-poong and the fight, following. At 16 May 1961, the 16 May coup started. He was after approved by Park Chung Hee.

From 17 December 1963, to 30 March 1966, he was Mayor of Seoul. In 1968, he advised Park Chung Hee, social security authorities for a long time. He fought his nephew Yun Bo-seon, and he was followed by Park Chung Hee.

== Popular culture ==
- Portrayed by actor Kim Yong-gun in the 1981–82 TV series, 1st Republic.

== See also ==
- American University
- Syngman Rhee
- Park Chung Hee
- Yun Bo-seon
- Seo Jae-pil
- Yun Chi-ho
- Chinilpa
- Yun Chi-Oh
- Heo Jeong
- Chang Myon
- Kim Seong Su

Political offices
Preceded by -	Interior Minister of South Korea; August 1948 – December 1948	Succeeded by Shin Seong-mo
Preceded by Yun Tae-il	Mayor of Seoul City; 17 December 1963 – 30 March 1966	Succeeded by Kim Hyun-ok
Preceded by Kong Jin-hang	Republic of Korea Ambassador to French; 23 November 1950 – 27 April 1951	Succeeded by Chun Kyu-hong
