= Democratic Nationalist Party (South Korea) =

1949–1955 political party in South Korea

Democratic Nationalist Party 민주국민당 民主國民黨
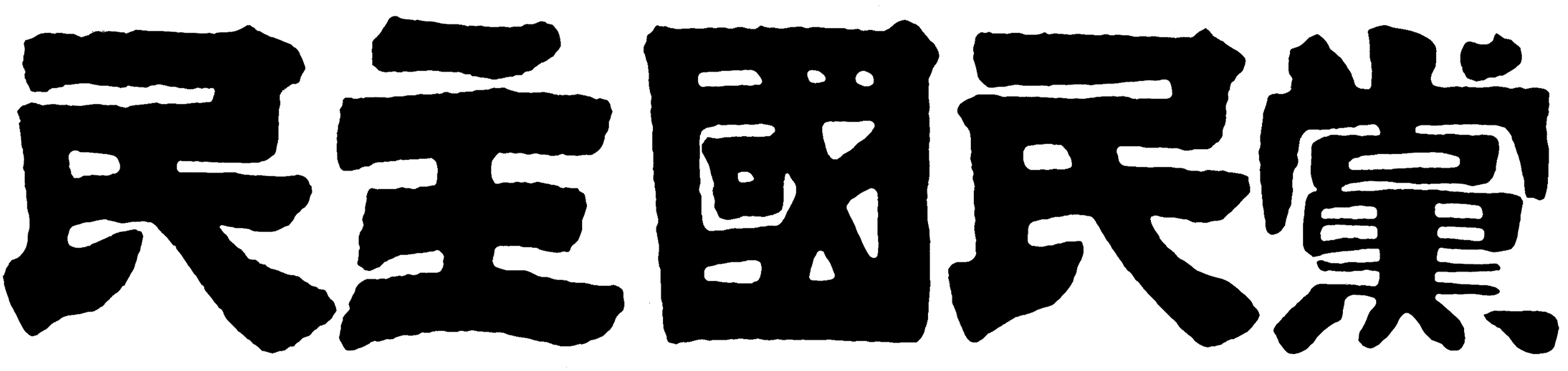
- Abbreviation: DNP
- Founded: 1949
- Dissolved: 1955
- Preceded by: Korea Democratic Party
- Succeeded by: Democratic Party
- Political position: Right-wing

The Democratic Nationalist Party (DNP; Korean: 민주국민당; Hanja: 民主國民黨; RR: Minju gungmindang) was a conservative political party in South Korea.

== History ==
The DNP was established on 10 February 1949 as a merger of the Korea Democratic Party and groups that supported Yi Chong-chon (who headed a youth organisation) and Shin Ik-hee (a member of the National Association), with the new party holding 70 of the 200 seats in the Assembly. It supported the creation of a parliamentary republic, and in 1950 proposed a constitutional amendment to this effect, although it was defeated in the Assembly.

In the 1950 parliamentary elections the party received the highest share of the vote, although at 10%, it won only 24 of the 210 seats in a parliament dominated by independents. It nominated Yi Si-yeong as its candidate for the 1952 presidential elections; he finished third with 11% of the vote.

The 1954 parliamentary elections saw the party's vote share fall to 8% as it was reduced to 15 seats. In 1955 it was succeeded by the Democratic Party.

== Election results ==
=== President ===
Election	Candidate	Votes	%	Result
1952	Yi Si-yeong	764,715	10.89	Not elected

=== Vice President ===
Election	Candidate	Votes	%	Result
1952	Chough Pyung-ok	575,260	8.06	Not elected

=== House of Representatives ===
Election	Leader	Votes	%	Seats	+/–	Position	Status
1950	Sin Ik-hui; Kim Sung-su	683,910	9.79	24 / 210	new	1st	Opposition
1954	Sin Ik-hui	593,499	7.92	15 / 203	▼9	4th	Opposition
