= Kim Hak-cheol =

Korean activist and writer (1916–2001)

- Born: Hong Sung-geol; 4 November 1916; Wonsan, South Hamgyong Province
- Died: 25 September 2001 (aged 84); Yanji, Jilin, China
- Spouse: Kim Hye-won
- Children: Kim Hae-yang (김해양)
- Writing career
- Period: 1946–1995
- Genres: Literary fiction, memoir, short story
- Notable work: The Myth of the Twentieth Century

Korean name
- Hangul: 홍성걸
- Hanja: 洪性傑
- RR: Hong Seonggeol
- MR: Hong Sŏnggŏl

Pseudonym
- Hangul: 김학철
- Hanja: 金學鐵
- RR: Gim Hakcheol
- MR: Kim Hakch'ŏl

Hong Sung-geol (Korean: 홍성걸; Hanja: 洪性傑; 4 November 1916 – 25 September 2001) better known under his military and literary alias Kim Hak-cheol (Korean: 김학철; Hanja: 金學鐵) was a Korean independence activist, democratic socialist and writer. Born in Korea under Japanese rule he moved to mainland China to join the growing resistance movement and eventually the Chinese Communist Party. During the Second Sino-Japanese War he was captured by Japanese forces in the Battle of Hujiazhuang. Kim made his literary debut after being released from prison in Nagasaki. After moving around South Korea and North Korea he eventually settled in Yanbian, China where he would spend the majority of his life and become a central part of Korean Chinese literature.

His works are noted as being highly political, criticizing both the imperialist forces he fought against, the anti-communism in South Korea, as well as the cult of personality in the communist countries he lived in. Although he lived the majority of his life in China he wrote most of his works in Hangul.

== Biography ==
Hong Sung-geol was born in 1916 in Wonsan, South Hamgyong Province (now under the jurisdiction of Kangwon Province, North Korea). While in school he got involved with the Korean independence movement. In 1935 Kim moved to China following other independence activists which were taking the fight outside of Japanese borders, a struggle supported by both Chiang Kai-shek's Republic of China and the Chinese Communist Party (CCP). He joined the Korean National Revolutionary Party and adopted the pseudonym Kim Hak-cheol in fear of his family being punished for his activities. (Note: This fact alongside his birth name was only revealed through Kim's testament in 2001.) In China he graduated at the Republic of China Military Academy. Following the outbreak of the Second Sino-Japanese War in 1937 Kim joined the Korean Volunteer Corps whose North China branch reorganized into the Korean Volunteer Army in 1942. During the early years of the war he would come to see himself as a communist and officially joined the CCP in 1940. On December 12, 1942 Kim, together with 28 comrades who were spending the night in a village at the foot of Taihang Mountain, was suddenly surrounded by an overwhelming amount of Japanese soldiers. In the ensuing Battle of Hujiazhuang Kim was shot in the leg and arrested. He was sentenced to 10 years in Nagasaki prison. Due to the injury Kim lost his leg in prison.

After his release in 1945 Kim moved to South Korea, but the anti-communist campaigns made him defect and move once again to Pyongyang, North Korea in 1946. In 1947 he began working as a writer for Rodong Sinmun and editor-in-chief for Joson Inmingun. It was also around this time that Kim started translating and adapting Nikolai Gogol's The Government Inspector for the screen but the project was eventually interrupted by the war. Upon witnessing the "dirty dictatorship" of Kim Il-sung for five years and finally the outbreak of the Korean War in 1950, Kim fled to Beijing where he enjoyed financial support from a wealthy patron and managed to publish a few works in Chinese. But before long he felt out of place. He is quoted as describing himself as a "potted plant" without his Korean compatriots. Kim had already released his first short stories in South Korea and published many more in North Korean newspapers. His first two short story collections, Gungong medal (군공메달; lit. 'Military Medal'; 1951) and Beomram (범람; lit. 'Flood'; 1952), were published in People's Literature, a Beijing-based literary magazine.

In 1953 Kim moved to the newly established Yanbian Autonomous Region, one of many autonomous administrative regions created for ethnic minorities in the early People's Republic of China. Kim grew disillusioned with Maoist China and, at the same time, came to regard the post-Stalinist Soviet ideology as an "ideal and authentic" example of socialism. This got so far that in 1961 he traveled to Beijing and tried to break into the Soviet embassy to apply for asylum in the Soviet Union.

In 1964 Kim started writing The Myth of the Twentieth Century, a novel criticizing contemporary policies of the CCP, specifically the Anti-Rightist Campaign, the Great Leap Forward and the growing cult of personality around Mao. The novel's title is an intentional reference to Alfred Rosenberg's novel of the same name, a foundational text of Nazism with Kim explicitly comparing the Maoist one-party state to Nazi Germany. The novel is divided in two parts. The first part depicts the hardship of a group of Korean Chinese writers in Anti-Rightist labor camps and the second part follows the same group after being released. The book repeatedly references Nikita Khrushchev's 1956 anti-Stalinist speech "On the Cult of Personality and Its Consequences" with it playing a central part in the political awakening of one of the protagonists. Kim had finished writing the novel by 1965 and started to translate it into Japanese himself when the Cultural Revolution broke out and Red Guards confiscated the manuscript. Kim was imprisoned for ten years (1967–1977). The Myth of the Twentieth Century remained unpublished until 1996.

After being released in 1977 Kim started writing down his memoirs, publishing Hangjeonbyeolgok (항전별곡; lit. 'Resistance Story') in 1983. He was made vice-chairman of the Yanbian branch of the China Writers Association two years later.

In June 2001 Kim visited Miryang, South Gyeongsang Province for the celebration of the 100th birthday of Yun Se-ju (윤세주), his superior in the anti-Japanese struggle, when he was diagnosed with a tumor around the armpit. He underwent surgery to remove the tumor but his condition worsened and his esophagus ruptured. After three months of inpatient treatment, Kim insisted on being discharged. Kim Hak-cheol died on 25 September 2001 at the age of 85. His cremated remains were scattered over the Tumen River.

== Writing style ==
In a 2020 article on Kim's writing, the author is described as having had "a lifelong obsession with the idea of an authentic Korean language", adopting the Seoul dialect modeled after Hong Myong-hui's multivolume novel Im Kkokjong (임꺽정), known for its "rich Seoul vocabulary". Kim is reported to have been carrying a copy of Im Kkokjong wherever he went. Although his novels featuring Korean Chinese characters use their unique dialect, he is quoted as saying that it "made the whole world boring".

== Bibliography ==
Short story collections by Kim Hak-cheol
Title	Year	Original publisher	Notes	Ref(s).
Gungong medal (군공메달; lit. 'Military Medal')	1951	People's Literature		
Beomram (범람; lit. 'Flood')	1952	People's Literature		
Saejip deuneun nal (새집 드는 날; lit. 'Moving Day')	1953	Yanbian University Press		
Bburi bageun teo (뿌리박은 터; lit. 'Rooted Land')	1953	Yanbian University Press		
Sejeon ibyeol (세전이별; lit. 'Departure before Life')	1954	Yanbian University Press		
Gomin (고민; lit. 'Deliberations')	1956	Publishing House of Minority Nationalities		
Beonyeong (번영; lit. 'Prosperity')	1957	Yanbian University Press		

Novels by Kim Hak-cheol
Title	Year	Original publisher	Notes	Ref.
Haerangang-a malhara (해란강아 말하라; lit. 'Let the Haeran River Speak')	1954	Yanbian University Press		
Hangjeon byeolgok (아아, 항전별곡; lit. 'Song of Resistance')	1983	Heilongjiang Korean Nationality Publishing House		
Gyeokjeong sidae (격정시대; lit. 'The Era of Passion')	1986	Liaoning Nationality Publishing House		
Mumyeong sojol (무명소졸; lit. 'Petty Soldier With No Name')	1989	Pulbit		
20 segiui sinhwa (20세기의 신화; lit. 'The Myth of the Twentieth Century')	1996	Changbi	Originally written from 1964–1965.	

Memoirs by Kim Hak-cheol
Title	Year	Original publisher	Notes	Ref.
Hangjeonbyeolgok (항전별곡; lit. 'Resistance Story')	1983	Heilongjiang Korean Nationality Publishing House		
Choihuui bundaejang (최후의 분대장; lit. 'The Last Squad Leader')	1995	Originally published by Moonji Publishing and republished by Bori Publishing in 2022.		

Liaoning Nationality Publishing House published the first anthology of Kim's work, Kim hakchul danpyeon soseoljip (김학철단편소설집; lit. Selected Short Stories of Kim Hak-cheol) in 1985. This was followed by five anthology volumes published by Yanbian People's Publishing House between 1998 and 2002.

== Reception and legacy ==
Kim is noted as an influential writer in Korean-speaking communities in East Asia. In July 2026 the South Korean publishing house Asia launched the grassroots-funded Kim Hak-cheol Literary Award and published an anthology of the winners' fiction. In its first iteration the prize was given to Hwang Jung-eun, Choi Jin-young and Jeon Chun-hwa.

Ten days before the 60th anniversary of the liberation of Korea, 5 August 2005, a monument honoring Kim Hak-cheol and fellow Korean independence fighter and writer Kim Sa-ryang was erected in the village of Hujiazhuang, Hebei, China.
