= Korean Volunteer Army =

1940–1945 arm of the Korean Independence Alliance faction

- 조선의용군 朝鮮義勇軍
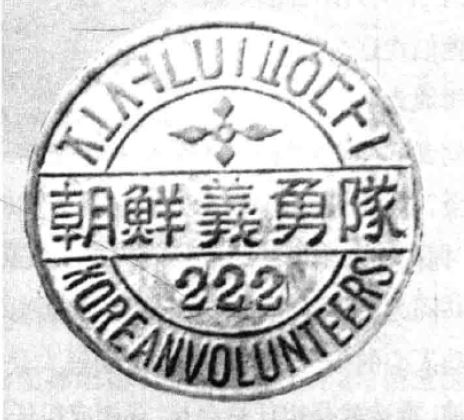
- Founders: Kim Tu-bong, Mu Chong
- Founded: 1942 (officially)
- Dates active: 1939 to 1945
- Merged into: Korean Liberation Army (nominally)
- Allegiance: Communist Party of China (Yan'an faction); Provisional Government of the Republic of Korea (nominally)
- Headquarters: Taihang Mountains
- Active regions: Korea, Manchuria and other parts of northeastern China
- Ideology: Korean nationalism
- Political position: Left-wing
- Size: 1,000 (1945)
- Part of: Chosŏn Independence Alliance; Northeast Anti-Japanese United Army
- Wars: Second Sino-Japanese War

The Korean Volunteer Army (Korean: 조선의용군; Hanja: 朝鮮義勇軍), was an armed wing of the Chosŏn Independence Alliance, formed in 1942 by reorganizing the North China branch of the Chosŏn Volunteer Corps. Based in Taihang Mountain, they fought an armed struggle against the Japanese until the end of World War II. They were disbanded and many of them were incorporated into the Korean People's Army. At the time of the establishment of the Democratic People's Republic of Korea, they were called the Yan'an faction, but were purged until 1958 after the Korean War.

== Background ==
In 1937, the Korean National Revolutionary Party, the Korean Youth Vanguard League, the Korean National Liberation League, and the Korean Anarchist League, which had been campaigning for independence in China after the second national-communist cooperation, had a joint meeting in Wuhan, Hubei Province, and established the Korean National Front Federation. The Chosŏn Volunteer Corps was formed as an armed force under it. The Chosŏn National Revolutionary Party had Kim Won-bong, who had led the Heroic Corps activities, as its leader, and the Chosŏn National Liberation Alliance was formed in 1936 with Kim San and others as the main axis. On the other hand, at that time, there were already about 50 members of the communist Chosŏn Youth War Service Corps led by Choi Chang-ik, and they were also reorganized into the Chosŏn Volunteer Corps. The Chosŏn Volunteer Corps, with Kim Won-bong as its commander-in-chief, was commanded by the Chinese Military Commission, headed by Chiang Kai-shek, according to the national-communist cooperation.

In June 1938, Japanese forces launched an attack on Wuhan, starting the Battle of Wuhan. The Battle of Wuhan was the first large-scale battle between China and Japan since the cooperation between the two countries. When the war turned unfavorable, Chiang Kai-shek ordered the withdrawal of Wuhan on October 24, and the Chosŏn Volunteer Army also withdrew accordingly. After that, the Chosŏn Volunteer Corps had no choice but to disperse and move to various places depending on the situation of the war. In November 1945, the 2,000 Chosŏn Volunteer Army, who marched into Manchuria, were divided into units 1, 3, 5, and 7 and spread throughout the country. The Chosŏn Volunteer Army expanded and reorganized into the 166th and 164th divisions of the Chinese People's Liberation Army and the independent 15th division as they recruited local Korean youths.

=== Formation ===
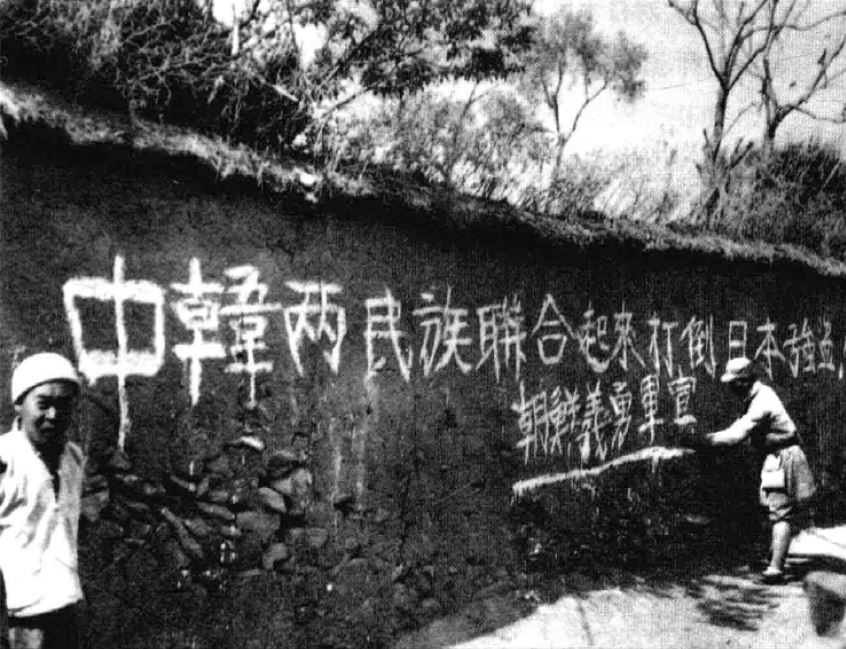
Korean Volunteer Army print slogans

In 1939, the Korean Volunteer Army (KVA), was formed in Yan'an, China. The two individuals responsible for the army were Kim Tu-bong and Mu Chong. At the same time, a school was established near Yan'an for training military and political leaders for a future independent Korea. By 1945, the KVA had grown to approximately 1,000 men, mostly Korean deserters from the Imperial Japanese Army. During this period, the KVA fought alongside the Chinese communist Northeast Anti-Japanese United Army from which it drew its arms and ammunition. After the defeat of the Japanese, the KVA accompanied the Chinese Communist Party forces into eastern Jilin, intending to gain recruits from ethnic Koreans in China, particularly from Yanbian, and then enter Korea.

The commander-in-chief of the Korean Volunteer Corps was Kim Won-bong, but after the retreat from Wuhan, the zones that were scattered in many places were acting independently. The Kuomintang government gave the Chosŏn Volunteer Corps a role such as interrogation of prisoners, but did not directly participate in the battle. Within the Korean Volunteer Corps, dissatisfaction arose about not being able to fight. In 1939, Kim Hak-moo, the deputy head of the Korean Volunteer Corps, argued for North Korea through a political speech, saying, "The rear struggle without gunfire is a fake anti-Japanese struggle." In accordance with this internal demand, Choi Chang-ik led his unit and formed the North China Chosŏn Youth Association with the Yan'an (Chinese region) socialists, the stronghold of the Chinese Communist Party. Meanwhile, the Chosŏn Volunteer Corps, which was under the command of the Chinese Nationalist Party in the Hubei region, moved to Mount Taihang, the base of the Chinese Communist Party's main unit, fearing sacrifices due to anti-communism within the Kuomintang. In July 1941, the two powers were reorganized into the Hwabuk region of the Chosŏn Volunteer Army. Sangmu Village in Dongyokjin, Taihang Mountain, where the North China Zone of the Chosŏn Volunteer Army was established, is currently managed as a historical site in China. On the other hand, the Heroic Corps Commemorative Society believes that Kim Won-bong's failure to join the Hwabuk region is due to Choi Chang-ik's check.

There were 147 people in the northern part of the Korean Medical Corps in Taihang Mountain, and the main mission was propaganda work, but there were several engagements with the Japanese army. In particular, the Battle of Hojiazhuang on December 12, 1941, was a fierce battle in which 29 Korean volunteers fought against about 500 Japanese troops. The Chinese Communist Party's official newspaper《Liberation Daily》reported on the war situation and became widely known.

In 1942, when the main unit of the Chosŏn Volunteer Army in Chongqing was incorporated into the Korean Liberation Army, a military unit of the Provisional Government of the Republic of Korea, the Chosŏn Youth Association in North China reorganized into the Chosŏn Independence Alliance and elected Kim Du-bong as the president. Kim Du-bong was a disciple of Ju Si-gyeong and also a Hangul activist. Also, the Chosŏn Volunteer Corp's Hwabuk area was reorganized into their party army, the Chosŏn Volunteer Army. At the beginning of its establishment, the Chosŏn Volunteer Army was a unit with independent command, but after 1943 it was commanded by the Palogun. From the point of view of the Korean Independence Alliance, the establishment of the Chosŏn Volunteer Army was the realization of the wish of achieving independence through armed resistance, but from the point of view of the Chinese Communist Party, it was one of the responses to the Northeast Anti-Japanese United Army, which was active in Manchuria with support from the Soviet Union at the time. Also, the consciousness of competition against the Korean Liberation Army, which was under the influence of the Kuomintang, also worked.

The commander-in-chief of the Chosŏn Volunteer Army was Kim Moo-jeong, who was located in Yan'an, and the commander of the North Hwabuk area was Park Hyo-sam. After moving to Yeonan at the end of 1943, as the armed struggle with Japan continued, Koreans around them enlisted and the number of troops increased significantly. The Chosŏn Volunteer Army trained officers by successively opening Chosŏn Youth Military and Political Officers School in September 1944, Shandong branch school of Chosŏn Military Political School in October, and Yanan Chosŏn Military Political School in February 1945. The Chosŏn Volunteer Army dispatched squads to Shandong and Shaanxi in Hebei from Taihang Mountain as a base, and dispatched members to Huazhong after the formation of the Sinsagun.

== Activities ==
=== Propaganda campaign in Sunmu ===
The main mission of the Chosŏn Volunteer Army was the operation of Seonmu in the North Hwabuk region. They wrote posters on buildings in areas occupied by the Japanese military and distributed leaflets written in three languages: Korea, China, and Japan. An old man from Hebei Province who remembers what happened at the time reported the activities of the Chosŏn Volunteer Army, saying, "Even though the enemy was tens of minutes away, we did everything we had to do."

=== Battle of Hujiazhuang ===
The Battle of Hujiazhuang is a battle with the Japanese army that took place when the Chosŏn Volunteer Army was still maintained as the northern part of the Chosŏn Volunteer Army. In December 1941, the north China region conducted activities such as Wonssi-hyeon, Bukyeong, and Wangjiazhuang, and burned Japanese military fortifications. On December 11, at Seonongchae, they encountered Japanese forces and engaged in an engagement, and continued their activities without any casualties.

The next day, December 12, 29 members of the 2nd Corps, who conducted propaganda activities in the area of Hujiazhuang, Wenxi County, Hebei Province, stayed overnight in the village and were surrounded by 500 Japanese soldiers. While member Park Cheol-dong broke through the siege and went to the Palo County to request support, Kim Hak-cheol was shot in the leg and arrested. Members of the 2nd squad broke through the encirclement with the Eighth Army, who came out to support after resisting fiercely, and returned home while continuing to engage the pursuing Japanese army. On December 28, another battle took place in Xingtai, and Son Il-bong, Choi Chul-ho, Wang Hyeon-soon, and Park Chul-dong were killed in the battle, and Captain Kim Se-gwang, squad leader Cho Yeol-gwang, and member Jang Rye -shin were wounded. Meanwhile, the Japanese suffered 18 killed and 32 wounded.

Arresting Kim Hak-cheol was not recognized as a party to the war and was tried for violating the "Public Safety Law", sentenced to 10 years in prison, imprisoned in Nagasaki Prison, and released on the occasion of the August 15th. The four soldiers who died in the Battle of Hojiazhuang were buried in Huangpeiping Village, and villagers cared for these graves until the Chosŏn Volunteer Cemetery was recognized as a historic site. After being designated as a historic site in 2002, a monument is erected. In 1993, Son Il-bong and Choi Cheol-ho were posthumously awarded the Patriotic Medal of the Order of the National Order of the Republic of Korea.

=== Battle of Mount Taihang ===
In February 1942, Japanese forces launched an attack on Mount Taihang in an attempt to annihilate the anti-Japanese militants in the Hebei region. In May, the 41st Division of the Japanese Army completely surrounded Mount Taihang, and the Eighth Route Army and the Chosŏn Volunteer Army had to secure a retreat for retreat. In this battle, the Eighth Army's deputy chief of staff, Zuoquan, was killed (the area is today called Zuoquan County), and about 10 members of the Chosŏn Uiyong Army, including Yun Se-ju and Jin Gwang-hwa, were killed. After the battle, the funerals of Zuoquan, Yun Se-ju, and Jin Guang-hwa were held, and the commander of the Eighth Route Army, Zhu De, read a eulogy.

=== Battle of Jinseobei ===
On November 13, 1942, the Chosŏn Uiyong Army set up a squad north of Jinseo, located in the Luryang Mountains, a mountain range west of Shanxi. The head of the squad was Kim Se-gwang and the organizer was Myung-cheol Mun. The Jinseobuk Squad, which had been engaged with the Japanese army several times since its establishment, was surrounded by hundreds of Japanese soldiers on April 14, 1943, and Myung Myung-cheol was killed during the battle. Myung Myeong-cheol, a native of Jeollanam-do, entered the Huangpu Military Academy for the anti-Japanese struggle and continued to work as an officer of the Chosŏn Volunteer Army after joining the Korean Volunteer Corps in the Kuomintang district in 1941.

== After liberation ==
In August 1945, Kim Du-bong, who predicted the defeat of Japanese imperialism, led four battalions of the Chosŏn Volunteer Army and headed for the Yalu River. However, Japan surrendered unconditionally before crossing the border, and the Soviet military government disarmed the Chosŏn Volunteer Army without recognizing it. On August 11, 1945, the Chinese Communist Party launched the Chosŏn Volunteer Army into Manchuria. The 2,000 Chosŏn Volunteer Army, which marched into Manchuria in November 1945, were divided into zones 1, 3, 5, and 7 and spread throughout the country. The Chosŏn Volunteer Army was expanded and reorganized into the 166th and 164th divisions of the Chinese People's Liberation Army, and the independent 15th division, which recruited local Korean youth. The Chosŏn Volunteer Army, under the command of the Eighth Army of China from 1943, grew from about 140 soldiers at the time of Gyeongseong to more than 1,000 troops in August 1945 when World War II ended.

About 100 commanders, including Kim Moo-jeong, also entered Korea in December 1945 as individuals. Members of the Chosŏn Volunteer Army, including Kim Moo-jung, were called Yeonanpa and formed a major political force in the early days of the establishment of the Democratic People's Republic of Korea. Meanwhile, the Chosŏn Volunteer Army, which remained in China, was caught up in the Chinese Civil War. The members remaining in Yan'an moved to Manchuria according to the order of the Chinese Communist Party and gathered in Yanbian to protect the Koreans. The Chosŏn Volunteer Army's stationing in Yanbian later became the background for the formation of an autonomous state for ethnic Koreans. On December 17, 1946, seven battalions surrendered to the Kuomintang. The only remaining battalion to the end was the Korean battalion.” The operation to separate the Koreans from the Chinese Communist Party was in vain. It seems to come towards us, but eventually betrays us. It is a truly cunning and distrustful nation. The sacrifices are great, and the results are insignificant.

In 1949, the 164th (12,000 men led by Vice Commander Kim Chang- deok) and the 166th (10,000 men led by Division Commander Bang Ho-san), organized by the Chosŏn Volunteer Army within the Chinese People's Liberation Army, were organized and sent to North Korea. They sent not only their bodies, but also weapons and equipment. (Chinese People's Liberation Army 164th Division Korean People's Army 5th Division Reorganized Division Commander Kim Chang-deok Chinese People's Liberation Army 166th Division Korean People's Army 6th Division Reorganized Division Commander Bang Ho-san entered North Korea from July to August 1949).

Under the leadership of comrades, the 15th independent division of the People's Liberation Army of China (14,000 men) arrived in Wonsan from Sinuiju by train in early April 1950, and was reorganized into the 12th division of the People's Army (commander Jeon Woo). In addition, about 55,000 to 60,000 troops led by the Chosŏn Volunteer Army, such as Shenyang Mixed Troops, Korean-Chinese troops of the Railway Corps, and Jilin branch students of the Northeast Military Government University, were incorporated into the People's Army, and the North Korean military power was greatly increased. Received encouragement to “go to South Korea and annihilate the reactionary forces of Syngman Rhee,” he crossed the border and arrived in North Korea (80% of all officers were Koreans who belonged to the People's Liberation Army of China). After the Korean People's Army was created, many were incorporated into the People's Army after the Korean Civil War. The Yeonan Faction, which was associated with the Chosŏn Volunteer Army, was involved in the August Sect Incident after the Korean War and was purged by Kim Il-sung in 1958.

== See also ==
- List of militant Korean independence activist organizations
- Korean Volunteer Corps
- Korean Independence Movement
- Korean Liberation Army
- People’s Volunteer Army
- Korean War
