= Park Cha-jeong =

Korean independence activist (1910–1944)

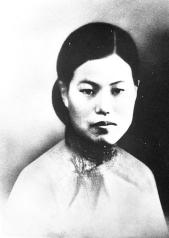
- Born: May 8, 1910; Busan, Japanese-occupied Korea
- Died: May 27, 1944 (aged 34); Chongqing, Republic of China
- Resting place: Miryang, South Korea
- Known for: Korean independence activism

Korean name
- Hangul: 박차정
- Hanja: 朴次貞
- RR: Bak Chajeong
- MR: Pak Ch'ajŏng

Park Cha-jeong (Korean: 박차정; May 8, 1910 – May 27, 1944) was a Korean independence activist and the second wife of Kim Won-bong. Her assumed names were Yim Cheol-ae (임철애, 林哲愛) and Yim Cheol-san (임철산, 林哲山). She led the female students' pro-independence protest by the Korean Women's League.

Park was born in Busan. Her father committed suicide fighting Japan, and her family were independence activists. In 1929, she graduated from the J. B. Harper Memorial School, the first Australian missionary school founded in Korea. In 1930, she went to China and worked in Beijing to rebuild the Communist Party of Korea. She married Kim Won-bong in 1931. In 1939 she was injured in Jiangxi and died at Chongqing in 1944. She was buried in Miryang, where Kim Won-bong was born. In 1995, she was posthumously awarded the Order of Merit for National Foundation. Her statue is located in Busan.

== Legacy ==
Park contributed the following to the Manifesto of the Namkyeong Joseon Women's Society, established in 1936.

The traditional suppression has violated us Korean women's human rights, and again, our rights to live have been seized by Japanese Imperialism. We have fallen as not only slaves of our homes by traditional suppression, but slaves of wage labor as products of the plunder market of Japanese Imperialism. If we do not overthrow the Japanese Empire, we women cannot liberate from the feudal system's restriction and colonial oppression. And even when the Japanese Empire is overthrown, if Chosŏn's revolution is not truly of a genuine, free, and equal revolution politically, economically, and socially, we women will not achieve true liberation.

== See also ==
- Anarchism in Korea
