= Korean Liberation Army =

1940–1946 arm of the Korean Provisional Government

- 한국광복군 韓國光復軍
- Founder: Kim Ku
- Dates active: 17 September 1940 – May 1946
- Country: Korea
- Allegiance: Provisional Government of the Republic of Korea; National Revolutionary Army (until 1944)
- Headquarters: Chongqing, Republic of China (1940; 1942–1945); Xi'an, Republic of China (1940–1942)
- Size: 3,600

The Korean Liberation Army (KLA; Korean: 한국광복군; Hanja: 韓國光復軍), also known as the Korean Restoration Army, was the armed forces of the Provisional Government of the Republic of Korea. It was established on September 17, 1940, in Chongqing, Republic of China, with significant financial and personnel support from the Kuomintang. It participated in various battles and intelligence activities against the Japanese, including alongside the British Army in India and with the United States in the Eagle Project.

Its commandant was General Chi Ch'ŏngch'ŏn and chief of staff General Lee Beom-seok, the future first prime minister of South Korea. The group reached a peak of several hundred personnel. It experienced frequent funding issues, infighting, and difficulty achieving recognition from global powers.

== Background ==
Since the Japan-Korea Treaty of 1910, the Korean Peninsula had been formally annexed by the Empire of Japan. After the brutal suppression by Japanese authorities of the pro-independence March First Movement of 1919, thousands of Koreans fled the peninsula. Several prominent Koreans congregated in Shanghai, Republic of China, where they founded a government-in-exile: the Korean Provisional Government (KPG). However, it was not the only Korean independence organization; numerous others were formed, often differing in ideology and location.

The KPG went on to conduct various anti-Japanese activities, including a nearly successful assassination attempt on the Emperor of Japan Hirohito. After KPG member Yun Bong-gil detonated a bomb in Shanghai's Hongkou Park that killed several Japanese military and colonial government officials, the KPG was pursued across China by the Japanese government. Most of them eventually ended up in Nanjing, where the Kuomintang offered them financial support and protection from the Japanese.

=== Precursor to Korean Liberation Army ===
The KPG had wanted to create an army since 1919. They made various efforts to coordinate with the various Korean guerrilla warfare groups in Manchuria, but lacked the funds and manpower to do so.

In July 1932, Kim Gu requested to meet with Chiang Kai-shek, leader of the Kuomintang. One of Kim's main asks at the meeting was assistance and funding in establishing a cavalry training school for the numerous Koreans in Manchuria. Chiang agreed to meet Kim, but was skeptical of the viability of the cavalry school. They eventually met in May 1933, and Chiang granted permission for Kim to train resistance fighters in the Luoyang branch of the Republic of China Military Academy.

Thus, Kim trained 92 students in the 17th Army Officer Training Class of the 4th Battalion (제4대대 육군군관훈련반 제17대; 第4大隊 陸軍軍官訓鍊班 第17隊), around 30 km north of Luoyang. Kim's class was named and presented as if it were yet another all-Chinese class (the previous 16 classes had graduated only Chinese students), to avoid detection from the Japanese. Training covered topics such as tactics, weapons, politics, communication, physical education, riding, and shooting. They trained with great urgency, as there was a prevailing sense that a second Sino-Japanese conflict and/or World War would erupt within one to two years.

He had made a special point of recruiting the armed forces (한국독립군; 韓國獨立軍; lit. 'Korean Independence Army (1929)') of the 1930 Korea Independence Party (different from Kim's party). These fighters had sided with Chinese forces during the Japanese invasion of Manchuria. Also in attendance were 20 students of the Joseon Revolutionary Military and Political Officers School (조선혁명군사정치간부학교; 朝鮮革命軍事政治幹部學校) in Nanjing.

On 9 April 1935, the school ceased operations after only about a year. Of the original 92 students, 62 graduated. The school was closed for a variety of reasons, including internal conflicts between left and right-leaning members and the 21 January 1935 negotiations between the Kuomintang and Japanese governments. Most of the fighters trained here eventually joined the KLA.

=== Second Sino-Japanese War ===
In early July 1937, the anticipated conflict between the Chinese and Japanese finally began. The KPG made a plan to quickly raise an army to join the Chinese in fighting the Japanese, but they abandoned this within months as they escaped across the country alongside the Kuomintang. They eventually ended up in Chongqing around 1939.

== History ==
=== Establishment ===
In September 1939, the Korean Independence Party established the Korean Restoration Army, which Kim Ku wanted to keep as an independent unit, without obtaining approval from the Chinese government.

On 11 November 1939, the KPG announced a plan, created by Jo So-ang, to create an army. Like their failed proposal in 1938, it was wildly ambitious, calling for 110,000 party members, 1,200 officers, 100,000 soldiers, and 350,000 guerrillas raised after four years, totaling 541,200 personnel across six countries. It had an astronomical price tag of 70.18 million yuan. By contrast, the total budget of the KPG in 1939 was 29,123 yuan. Son Sae-il, a journalist, Korean historian, and former politician, described the plan as "wildly removed from reality", and called Jo and the State Council that approved the plan "hopeless utopians". Once Kim took the reins of creating the army, he took a more realist approach.

On 11 April 1940, Chiang approved Kim's proposal for creating a KPG army, albeit with funding granted only depending on immediate needs. However, a disagreement between the Kuomintang and Kim arose, as Chiang wanted the army to be subordinate to the Kuomintang army, and Kim wanted greater independence in order to establish the army's credibility and legitimacy. The Kuomintang pulled out of the deal, refusing to provide funding. Kim moved forward anyway with creating the army.

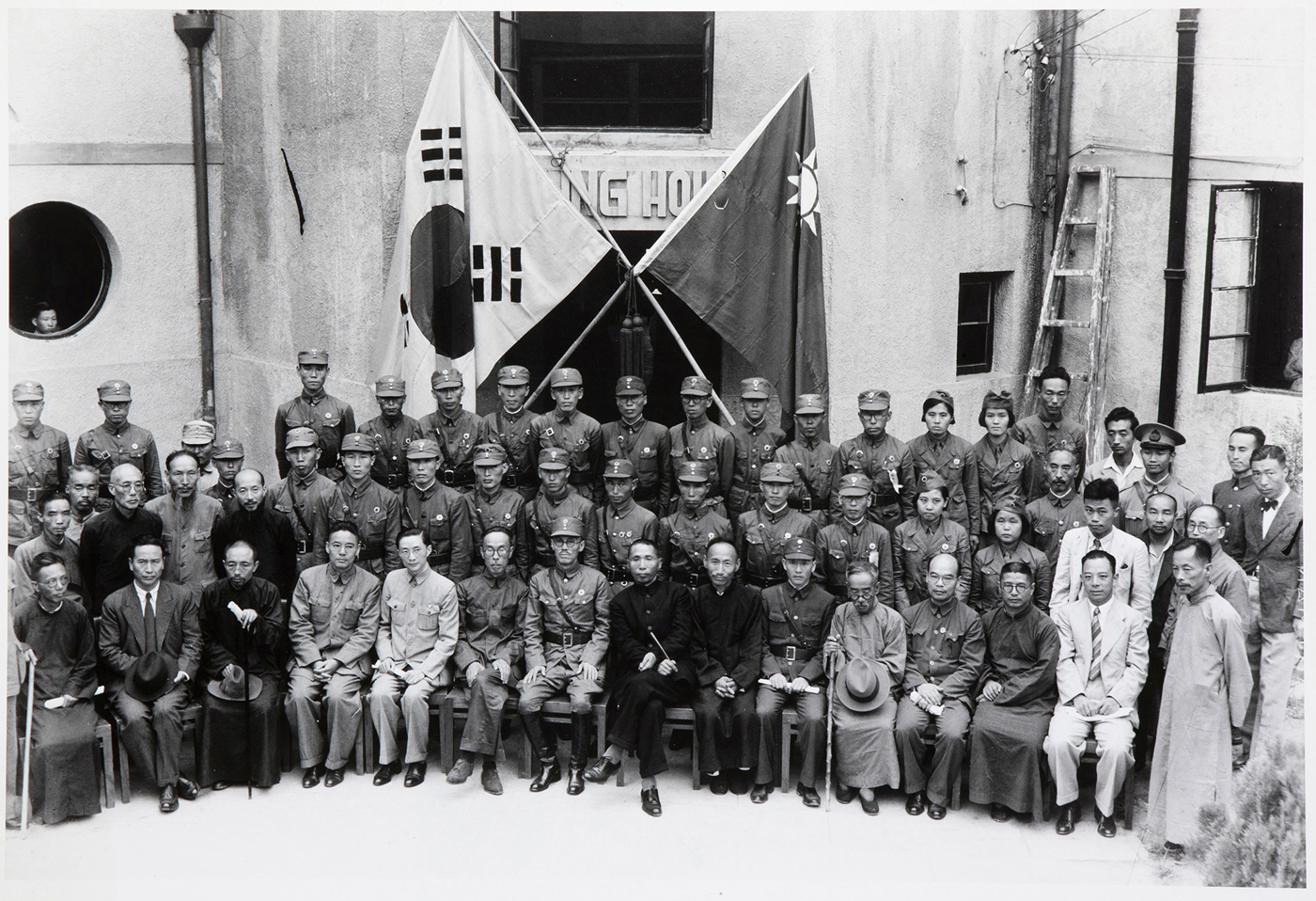
The inauguration of the Korean Liberation Army (17 September 1940)

On 17 September 1940, the formal establishment of the Korean Liberation Army (KLA) was announced. General Chi Ch'ŏngch'ŏn was to be its commander. They held a grand ceremony at the then-luxurious Jialing Hotel (Chinese: 嘉陵賓館), to establish the army's credibility and reputation. It was held early in the morning, at 6 am, to avoid Japanese air raids. Over 200 people were in attendance, including foreign ambassadors and Kuomintang officials.

The KLA became a rallying point for the Korean-American community, and donations came in greater volume. The San Francisco-based Sinhan Minbo newspaper regularly and prominently reported on the KLA's activities. Many in the KLA were adamantly convinced that around 30 million Koreans on the peninsula would eventually rise against the Japanese and support the KLA's cause.

On 12 November, the army was held in rear areas but, to a limited extent, engaged in propaganda, intelligence, and guerrilla activities. However, the KLA announced its intent to switch from guerrilla warfare to conventional battle. They also moved their headquarters to Xi'an around this time. There, they began conducting covert operations, recruiting youths, and publishing Chinese and Korean language newsletters. By 1 January 1941, they created five divisions, with over 100 people in the fifth division alone. By 1943, their numbers grew to 3,600 troops.

=== Difficulty gaining Kuomintang and US support ===
The KLA had a strained relationship with the Kuomintang for much of its history, due to disagreements over authority and funding. The Kuomintang put off formally recognizing the KLA for months and providing support for even longer. The KLA was growing rapidly, as hundreds of Koreans from all over China flocked to join, but the soldiers were sitting idle and underfunded. In February 1941, the Kuomintang even ordered its armed forces to block or restrict KLA activities. However, they began easing up around March, and by 28 May 1941, they formally recognized the KLA. The Regulation Regarding the Activities of the Korean Liberation Army, imposed by the Kuomintang upon the KPG in 1941, placed the KLA under the supreme authority of the commander-in-chief of the Chinese Army. But aid was still slow to come. One reason for this delay was Kim Won-bong's interference, as he naturally viewed the KLA as competition, especially because the Volunteers Army was subordinate to the Kuomintang and the KLA was more politically aligned with the Kuomintang. Another reason was concern about international pushback, particularly from the United States and the Soviet Union, by approving the KLA.

The US government hesitated to approve not just the KLA, but also the KPG. Kim sent multiple letters to President Franklin D. Roosevelt asking for the establishment of formal KPG-US ties, including one sent via President Roosevelt's son, James Roosevelt, who visited Chongqing in July. But these were all ignored. Especially after the December 1941 Attack on Pearl Harbor, many in the US government were open to supporting Korean independence, but were cautious because of how it could impact the Pacific War, how it could cause other independence movements to demand US support, and because of the internal political division amongst Koreans. Also, around December 1941, the KPG declared war on Japan.

On 10 April 1942, the Kuomintang informed the US that it wished to solely recognize the KPG, and asked if the US would too. However, the US rejected this request in early May. As a result, the Kuomintang also abandoned this.

=== Merging with the Korean Volunteers Army ===
In early 1942, Kim became aware that the Kuomintang had been privately negotiating with his left-leaning rival Kim Won-bong to absorb the two dozen officers of the Korean Volunteer Army (Korean: 조선의용대; Hanja: 朝鮮義勇隊) (Note: Different army from the Yan'an faction army that eventually became led by Kim Il Sung) in Chongqing into the KLA. Kim Won-bong relented to this, on the condition that he become the Deputy Commander (Korean: 부사령관; Hanja: 副司令官), a position that did not yet exist in the KLA.

On 13 May, the KPG relented and approved the merger. Thus, the Korean Volunteers Army became absorbed into the KLA. This decision displeased both sides. Kim protested to the Kuomintang in multiple letters, insisting they avoid directly interfering in the KLA's affairs. Kim Won-bong reportedly cried and drank all night on 15 May, and delayed taking up his position until 5 December. Kim Won-bong's relationship to the KPG would continue to be strained, even as he was elected as head of the Armed Forces on 11 April 1944. This position was notably weakened, and he would continue to be excluded in other ways.

To gain greater control over the KLA, the Kuomintang quickly began reducing funding and placing numerous Chinese officers in vacant KLA administration positions. This effectively made any significant military activities impossible.

The KLA sent troops to fight alongside the British Indian Army in the South-East Asian Theatre of World War II by the request of the British Army, as they needed Japanese speakers. On 29 August 1943, nine KLA personnel were sent to Calcutta. The Supreme Allied Commander South East Asia Command Louis Mountbatten requested more troops, so the Kuomintang reluctantly arranged for 16 more KLA personnel to go, but this was delayed. The soldiers were deployed on the outskirts of Burma and India (especially the Battle of Imphal during the Burma Campaign).

=== Eagle Project ===
Finally, on 1 May 1945, after a few months of negotiations, the KPG gained full control over the KLA under an agreement with the Kuomintang entitled Measures to Aid the Korean Liberation Army (원조한국광복군판법; 援助韓國光復軍辦法). The agreement also specified that the Kuomintang would fund KLA operations by loaning funds. This effectively allowed the KLA to more freely collaborate with other Allied countries.

Beginning in late 1944, KLA officials began discussing cooperation with agents from the US Office of Strategic Services (OSS). While there was a prevailing sentiment that the Allies would win the war, they expected the war with Japan to last at least another full year and possibly involve an invasion of Korea and mainland Japan. Thus, the KLA sought to offer its services to the OSS in exchange for improved status of the KPG after the war.

In September 1944, Lee Beom-seok, then Chief of Staff of the KLA, met with Colonel Joseph Dickey of the US Military Intelligence Service in Chongqing. (Note: Dickey was one of the planners of the Dixie Mission, which investigated whether the US should cooperate with the Chinese Communist Party. Dickey reportedly took interest in Lee's request and suggested he visit Washington. Kim began arranging Lee's trip to the US, but the trip never occurred.) Lee then met with OSS Agent Captain Clyde Bailey Sargent, who was fluent in Chinese and a former professor at Chengdu University. Sargent then suggested to the head of the OSS General William J. Donovan that the OSS collaborate with the KLA. An agreement to collaborate was reached in October 1944.

On 24 February, the OSS finished planning the Eagle Project (독수리작전), and it was approved by US military headquarters on 13 March.

=== End of World War II ===
The KLA prepared for the Eagle Project, and expected to depart to Korea on August 20, with General Lee in command.

However, the surprise of the atomic bombings of Hiroshima and Nagasaki interrupted the progress of the mission. The declaration of Japan's intent to surrender on August 15 threw the Korean Peninsula into chaos, and the Soviet Union continued its attacks. The Red Army quickly overwhelmed Japanese forces and gained the north of the Korean Peninsula, but the US landed in the South and accepted the formal surrender of Japanese forces in the south, marking the division of the Korean Peninsula into de facto spheres of influence between the Americans and the Soviets. Korean independence was reaffirmed in the Treaty of San Francisco. With Japanese colonial rule over Korea having ended, the KLA disbanded in June 1946.

== Postwar ==
The members of the KLA returned to Korea during late 1945 and 1946. Many of its members, including Generals Ji and Lee, became part of the Government of the Republic of Korea, and some Generals and Commissioned officers participated to form the ROK Armed Forces.

There has been a movement in South Korea for years to change the National Armed Forces Day from October 1 to September 17 in honour of the foundation of the Korean Liberation Army in 1941.

== Army ranks ==
Rank group	General / flag officers			Senior officers			Junior officers
Korean Liberation Army
Korean Liberation Army	정장 正將; Jeongjang	부장 副將; Bujang	참장 參將; Chamjang	정령 正領; Jeonglyeong	중령 副領; Junglyeong	참령 參領; Chamlyeong	정위 正尉; Jeongwi	부위 副尉; Buwi	부사 參尉; Busa

Warrant officer
Insignia
Korean	준위 准尉; Junwi
English translation	Warrant Officer

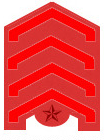
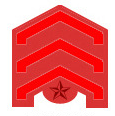
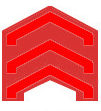
Rank group	Senior NCOs				Junior NCOs		Enlisted
Korean Liberation Army
Korean Liberation Army	특무상사 特務上士; Teugmusangsa	상사 上士; Sangsa	중사 中士; Jungsa	하사 下士; Hasa	상등병 上等兵; Sangdeungbyeong	일등병 一等兵; Ildeungbyeong	이등병 二等兵; Ideungbyeong

== Gallery ==
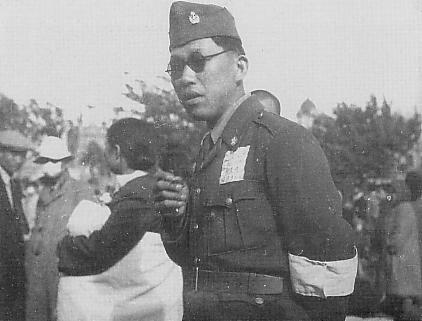
KLA Soldier

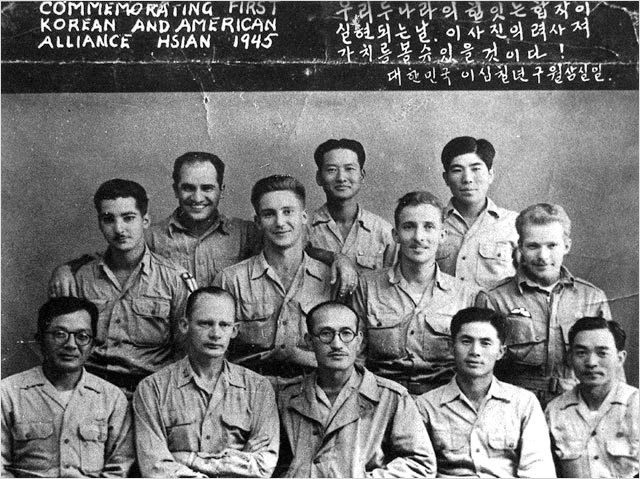
Lee Beom-seok with Korean Liberation Army and OSS agents.

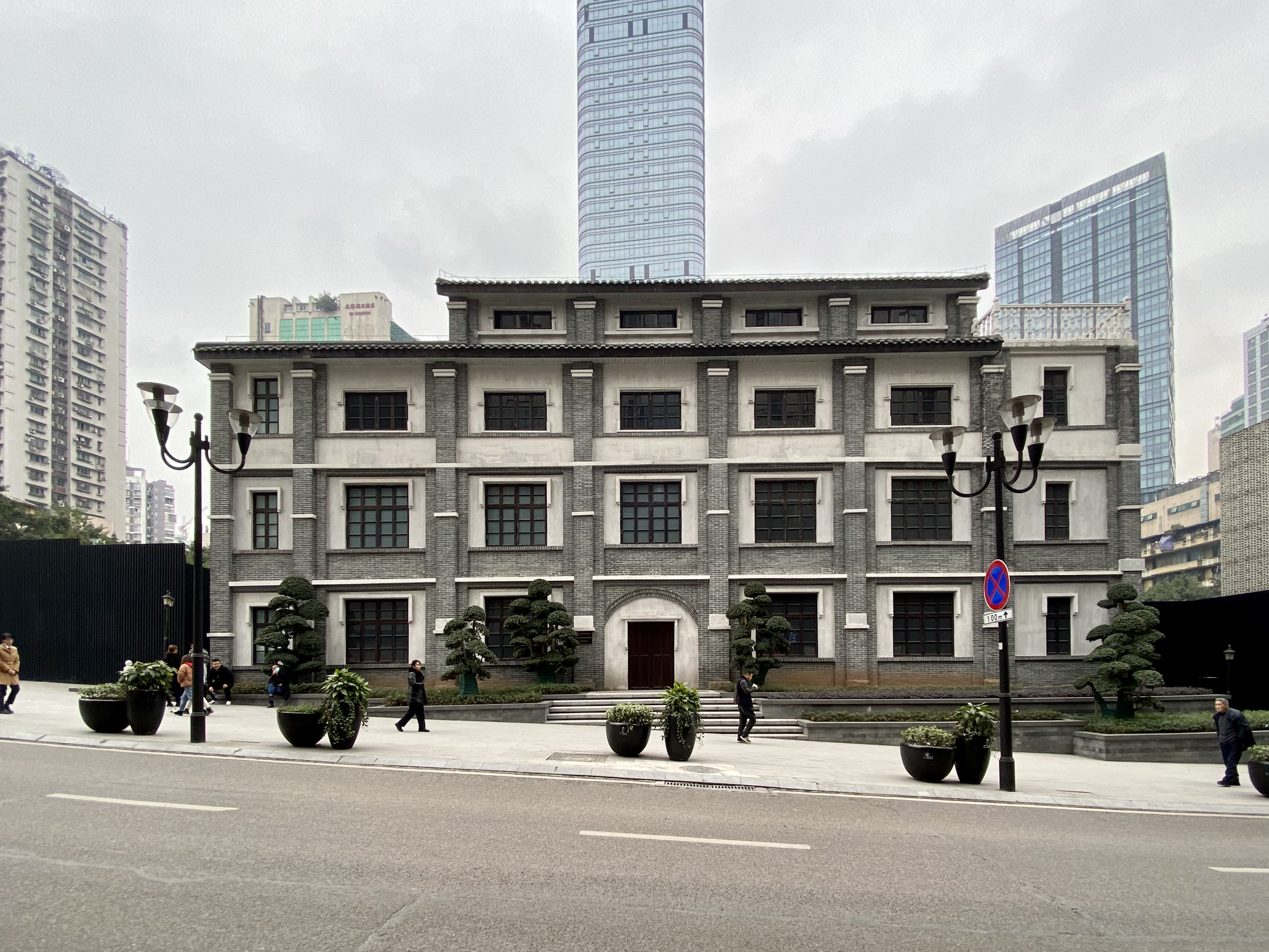
Former Korean Liberation Army headquarter in Chongqing

== Equipment ==
=== Pistol ===
- Mauser C96 (Even Chinese copy)
- FN M1900
- FN M1903
- FN M1910/22
- Nambu pistol
- Nagant M1895
- Nagant M1878
- Mauser M1914
- Type 26
- M1911
- Walther P38

=== Rifle ===
- Kar 98
- M1 Carbine
- Arisaka rifle
- M1 Garand
- Mosin Nagnant
- Lee Enfield
- M1903 Springfield
- M1941 Johnson rifle
- Type 77
- Hanyang 88

=== SMG ===
- MP18
- M3 Grease gun

=== Machine gun ===
- ZB 26
- Maxim M1910

== See also ==
- History of Korea
- Korean independence movement
- Provisional Government of the Republic of Korea
- List of militant Korean independence activist organizations
- Korean Volunteer Army
- Korean Volunteer Corps
- Righteous army
