= Eagle Project =

1945 interrupted World War II operation

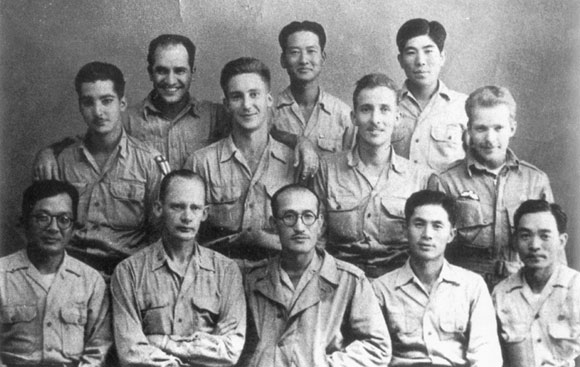
- Eagle Project operatives (September 30, 1945)
- Operational scope: Espionage and guerrilla warfare
- Planned by: Office of Strategic Services; Korean Liberation Army
- Objective: Infiltrate Korea under Japanese rule to support Allied operations there
- Date: March 13, 1945 – August 30, 1945
- Executed by: Korean Liberation Army
- Outcome: Training interrupted by Surrender of Japan, never fully carried out

The Eagle Project (Korean: 독수리작전) was a joint operation during World War II between the Office of Strategic Services of the United States and the Korean Liberation Army of the Provisional Government of the Republic of Korea. It is also called Project Eagle or Operation Eagle.

The objective was to train and send Korean soldiers to infiltrate five key strategic cities in the Japanese-occupied Korean Peninsula: Chongjin, Sinuiju, Busan, Pyongyang, and Seoul. However, the operation never passed the training phase and was interrupted by the surrender of Japan on August 15, 1945.

== Background ==
Since the Japan-Korea Treaty of 1910, the Korean Peninsula had been formally annexed by the Empire of Japan. After the brutal suppression by Japanese authorities of the pro-independence March First Movement of 1919, thousands of Koreans fled the peninsula. A number of prominent Koreans congregated in Shanghai, Republic of China, where they founded a government-in-exile: the Korean Provisional Government (KPG). The KPG went on to conduct various anti-Japanese activities, including a nearly successful assassination attempt on the Emperor of Japan, Hirohito. However, it was not the only Korean independence organization; numerous others formed that often differed by ideology and location.

In 1937, shortly before World War II, the Second Sino-Japanese War broke out between China and Japan. This motivated the 1940 creation of the Korean Liberation Army (KLA): the military of the KPG. The KLA carried out limited activities in Xi'an, but was severely restricted by internal conflict and disputes with the Kuomintang, who provided most of the KPG's funding. Meanwhile, World War II broke out in 1939, and the US entered the war on December 7, 1941, after the attack on Pearl Harbor.

=== 1942 Olivia plan ===
The later leader of the OSS, Colonel William J. Donovan, was the only senior leader in the US government to have personally visited Korea before the start of World War II. In June 1919, Donovan and his wife landed in Busan, and took a train up to Seoul. Donovan recorded in his diary an overview of Korean history that he learned during the few days that he spent there. He also recorded the tight state of security and repression, as he visited just months after the March 1st Movement protests. He noted that Koreans were forced to use the Japanese language.

In fact, years before the Eagle Project, Donovan had planned to have the predecessor to the OSS, the Coordinator of Information (COI), work with the KPG. In January 1942, Donovan began a plan for how to use Koreans to undermine the Japanese war effort. In February, he sent Dr. Esson Gale to China to contact the KPG. Gale was an academic who had lived in Asia and was a nephew of a missionary to Korea James S. Gale. On January 27, under orders from Donovan, Lt. Col. Morris DePass published a draft of a plan, code named "Olivia", on how to use the Koreans. According to the plan, the COI would establish a base of operations in Chongqing, and employ the KPG in sabotage and assassination operations. However, the scholar Robert S. Kim notes that the COI had limited access to reliable information about the KPG, and likely had inflated views of its capabilities. This mission ultimately failed to materialize, as when Gale arrived in China, he came into conflict with the US ambassador in China Clarence Gauss, who opposed the mission on the grounds that it conflicted with the goals of the State Department.

=== Collaboration ===
In an effort to secure more funding and the rights of the liberated Korea, the KPG began making greater efforts to reach out to foreign powers, particularly the Allies. After years of being mostly ignored by the major powers, they finally managed to convince the Office of Strategic Services (OSS) of the United States to cooperate with them.

== Creation of the Eagle Project ==
Beginning in late 1944, KLA officials began discussing cooperation with agents from the US Office of Strategic Services (OSS). While there was a prevailing sentiment that the Allies would win the war, they expected the war with Japan to last at least another full year and possibly involve an invasion of Korea and mainland Japan. Thus, the KLA sought to offer its services to the OSS in exchange for improved status of the KPG after the war.

In September 1944, Lee Beom-seok, then Chief of Staff of the KLA, met with Colonel Joseph Dickey of the US Military Intelligence Service in Chongqing. (Note: Dickey was one of the planners of the Dixie Mission, which investigated whether the US should cooperate with the Chinese Communist Party. Dickey reportedly took interested in Lee's request and suggested he visit Washington. Kim began arranging Lee's trip to the US, but the trip never occurred.) Lee then met with OSS Agent Captain Clyde Bailey Sargent, who was fluent in Chinese and a former professor at Chengdu University. Sargent then suggested to the head of the OSS General William J. Donovan that the OSS collaborate with the KLA. An agreement to collaborate was reached in October 1944.

On February 24, the OSS completed planning the Eagle Project, and received approval from US military headquarters in China on March 13.

The KLA informed Sargent that many of the selected candidates were college graduates and could speak rudimentary English. The plan was to iteratively narrow down 45 operatives over 8 months. These operatives would be assigned to either intelligence or communications squads and trained by the OSS in skills like wireless communication, espionage, explosives, scaling cliffs, and marksmanship. After this, they'd be assigned to one of five Korean cities: Chongjin, Sinuiju, Busan, Pyongyang, or Seoul. There, they'd perform intelligence operations, sabotage Japanese operations, and stir up unrest.

== Training ==
For the first training class, around 50 students congregated in Xi'an. Initially, Sargent and five other OSS agents served as instructors, and arrived in Xi'an by May 11. Afterwards, about 40 OSS members total were in Xi'an, including many Korean-Americans who worked as translators. Classes began in earnest on May 21, and ran for 8 hours a day. They were tested once per week, with failure meaning removal from the program. By the end of July, nine people had failed.

The training experience encountered several difficulties, the main one being the language barrier. In order to alleviate this, they created an English conversation class under instructor Robert Myers and dispatched more translators from Washington. Security was another issue; students were prohibited from going downtown without permission, and all mail was carefully inspected.

By August 4, the first round of training was completed, with 38 of the 50 passing. The second round of training began around early July in Lihuang, around 500 li southeast of Fuyang. The first round graduates allegedly performed well, and were highly praised by the instructors and later by Kim Ku, who visited shortly after their graduation. They decided to organize eight teams of four or five each to infiltrate the country by August 20.

== End ==
All were surprised by the sudden surrender of Japan. Kim, Lee, and the OSS began retooling their plans, and decided to have a division of the KLA return to the peninsula to perform reconnaissance and intelligence gathering tasks for the US. They decided to send the regiment in three groups, with the first group slated to depart for Korea within a week.

Lee flew out and eventually landed in Yeouido Airport on the 18th at 11:56 am. This marked the first time that the KPG and the U.S. Army set foot in Korea since the beginning of World War II. Despite having received permission to land, Lee and the American troops were initially treated with hostility. They were made to leave the following day, although the Japanese oddly held a drinking and dinner party for them before they left. Lee was disappointed. Upon hearing about the mission, General Wedemeyer was furious at how it had been organized (particularly at the lack of medical staff brought along to assist prisoners of war), and removed authority from the Eagle Project. The Eagle Project came to an end by August 30.

== See also ==
- Dixie Mission – Another mission by the OSS to establish relations with the Chinese Communist Party
