= Korean Volunteer Corps =

1938–1941 Korean independence army

- 조선의용대 朝鮮義勇隊
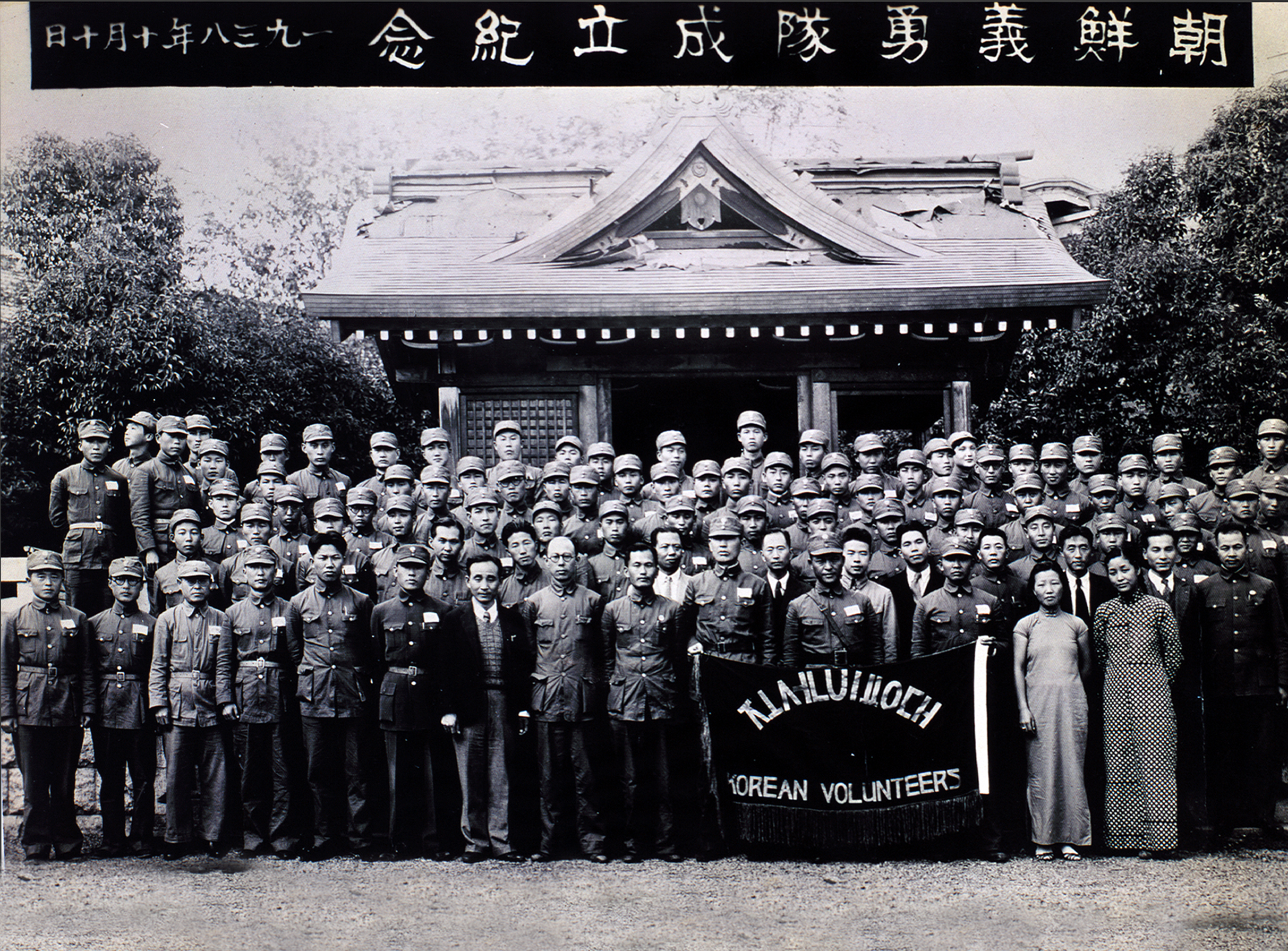
- Korean Volunteer Corps (1938)
- Founder: Kim Won-bong
- Dates active: 1938 to 1941
- Headquarters: Wuhan
- Size: 330 (1940)
- Part of: Korean National Revolutionary Party; Korean National Vanguard Alliance

The Korean Volunteer Corps (Korean: 조선의용대), alternatively the Korean Volunteers, Korean Anti-Japanese Volunteer Army, or the International Brigade was a militant Korean independence activist army founded in Hankou, Hubei, Republic of China on October 10, 1938.

It operated under the leadership of General Kim Won-bong as the Korean National Revolutionary Party's military organization. It was classified as an organization under the Korean National Vanguard Alliance. The Korean Volunteer Corps was incorporated into the Korean Liberation Army.

== Founding ==
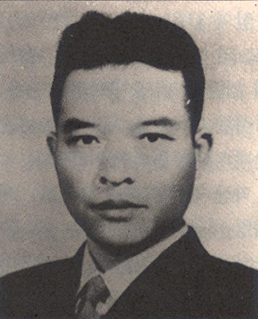
Kim Won-bong, General of the Korean Volunteers Corps

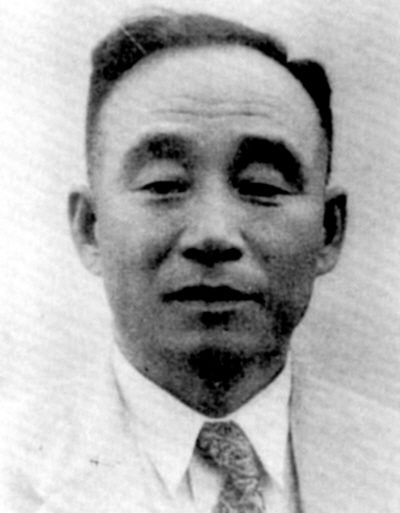
Choi Chang-ik

Before the Sino-Japanese War, independence activists active in mainland China joined the camp of Kim Ku and Kim Won-bong, who had friendly relations with the Kuomintang government, and received economic help from the Kuomintang. The Korean Patriotic Organization, the Korean People's Party, the Heroic Corps, and the Korean National Revolutionary Party tended to be run according to the will of Kim Gu and Kim Won-bong rather than being run by the democratic consensus of all members. Accordingly, Park Geon-woong argued that partial, secret, and intermittent activities should be changed to comprehensive, open, and continuous. Therefore, Park Geon-ung demanded that the Kuomintang government establish a unified policy for the independence of Joseon. Park Geon-woong's Chinese friend Na Cheong also contributed to the 'Joseon National Front' and argued for the need for a Sino-Korean united front, saying that 'equal cooperation' and 'unification guidance' were important. In other words, the Korean people should independently lead the revolution and the Kuomintang government should regard this as a comprehensive union of national units. Just as the communists formed the Eighth Route Army after the national-communist cooperation, the Korean people should also organize an independent unit.

Japanese anti-war activist Kazuo Aoyama drew up a plan to organize the Joseon Volunteer Corps, and included Wang Bong- saeng, head of the Institute of International Affairs, Jin Seong, head of the Political Department, Chow En -lae and Jang Yeo-saeng, deputy heads of the Political Department, Kang Taek, second head of the Political Department, Chung -han Ha, secretary-general of the Political Department, and Chairman of the Military Committee. Chiang Kai-shek's consent was obtained. Kazuo Aoyama's draft stated that an independent Korean unit of about 100 people would be created and organized by the Central Executive Committee of the 'Japan, Korea, Taiwan Anti-Fascist Alliance'. That is why the Joseon Volunteer Corps was also called the International Volunteer Army.

It was sponsored by the Kuomintang government and its activities were divided into the first and second zones. Kim Won-bong, Choi Chang-ik, Kim Seong-suk, Yu Ja-myeong, etc. participated as political members of the Military Committee. Park Hyo-sam was in charge of the first zone, and Lee Ik- seong was in charge of the second zone. The first zone was created with 42 members, including members of the National Revolutionary Party, and the second zone was created with 74 members centered on the Vanguard Alliance.

The highest organization was the leadership committee, which consisted of Lee Chun-am, Kim Seong-suk, Choi Chang-ik, Yoo Ja-myeong, and two members of the political department.

== Organization ==
The initial members were Commander-in-Chief Kim Won-bong, Deputy Commander Shin Ak, Political Assistant Kim Hak-mu, Assistant Member Lee Dal, Propaganda Commander Kim Chang-je, and General Affairs Director Lee Jip-jung. There were 200 people, including Lee Hae-myeong, director of affairs, and Han Ji-seong, director of foreign affairs.

At the time of its founding, the Joseon Volunteer Corps was organized into the headquarters department, the 1st district unit, and the 2nd district unit. Afterwards, the head office and the 1st district were divided in half and combined to expand and develop into the 1st and 3rd zones, respectively, and the 2nd district was reorganized into the 2nd zone. Initially, the number of troops was only about 200, but by February 1940, it had reached 314. Although the Joseon Volunteer Corps was supposed to be under the command of the Political Department of the Chinese Military Commission, in spirit it was an anti-Japanese unit under the guidance of the Korean National Front Alliance, which was mainly composed of Koreans.

At the 30th Cabinet meeting in May of the same year, Kim Won-bong, commander-in-chief of the Volunteer Corps, was inaugurated as the deputy commander of the Liberation Army following the expansion of the position of deputy commander in the Liberation Army, and the Volunteer Corps was incorporated into the 1st zone of the Liberation Army on May 18. With this opportunity, the liberation army was strengthened into three zones. In the 1st Zone of the Liberation Army, Deputy Commander Kim Won-bong served as the zone commander, General Affairs Manager Lee Jip-jung, 1st District Commander Lee So-min, and 3rd District Commander Park Hyo-sam were appointed.

The first organization was organized into two divisions. The 1st Division was led by Captain Park Hyo-sam and was active in the Hunan and Jiangxi areas. And the 2nd District was active in the Anhui and Luoyang areas under the command of Lee Ik-bong. The headquarters was initially located at No. 1, Dongling Street, Shudong Gate, Guilin, Guangxi Province, but later moved to Aguanbo, Chongqing City.

The Joseon Volunteer Corps planned to send many party members to Manchuria, rally their comrades at Mirsan-hyeon (密山縣) as their headquarters, and disrupt the rear of the Japanese Army. However, if this was judged to be impossible due to security and transportation issues, the troops advanced to the rear of the Chinese Army's 1st unit and were in charge of assisting the Chinese Army for propaganda purposes. In cases where such operations were difficult, active activities were carried out by secretly dispatching sophisticated elements not only to key locations such as Shanghai, Tianjin, and Beijing, but also to various places such as Japan, Joseon, Taiwan, and Manchuria.

== Activities ==
Video of Korean Volunteer Corps produced in 1938 at Wuhan, China.

The activities of the Korean Volunteer Corps were diverse, including combat, detection of Japanese military government or information collection in occupied areas, interrogation of Japanese prisoners of war and ideological work, propaganda work against the Japanese army, propaganda work against the Chinese army and people, and translation of enemy documents.

The Joseon Volunteer Corps was launched not as a combat unit but as an armed political propaganda unit. For China, the Anti-Japanese War was a 'war of justice', a military struggle and resistance against the invaders. China attempted to make up for its military inferiority through moral superiority, and the Joseon Volunteer Corps was established with the mission of propaganda against the Japanese army and against the Chinese.

The Joseon Volunteer Corps, which gained the unified support of the Kuomintang government through China's second national-communist collaboration, was established as a support unit of the Kuomintang government army and fought against the Japanese army in mainland China. The members received 20 won in monthly food expenses and 10 won in operating expenses from the Kuomintang government. paid by the Chinese side. Although the Joseon Volunteer Corps took the form of equal cooperation between Korea and China in the larger scheme of things, it was actually under the influence of figures from the Chiang Kai-shek faction of the Kuomintang Party.

The Kuomintang government judged them to be left-wing revolutionaries and placed them on the front lines. In February 1939, about 7,000 Korean troops rebelled near Gwangju and killed Japanese officers, and these conscripts joined the volunteer corps.

The Volunteer Corps was not a regular combat unit. They carried out guerrilla warfare, and since there were many members who could speak Korean, Chinese, and Japanese, they were in charge of propaganda work, distributing leaflets to the Japanese military and making broadcasts using loudspeakers. This did not change even after they moved to the Eighth Route Army area, and it was not until August 1945 that they were reorganized into a combat unit, and at the end of 1945, they entered Manchuria and expanded into a combat unit.

In March 1941, armed forces were deployed to Beijing, Hebei Province, Shimen, Henan Province, Jiangde, Qingdao, Shanghai, and Chongxiang County in Hebei Province. A political operation team was also dispatched.

=== Publication of the brochure: Korean Volunteer Corps News ===
One of the notable activities of the Korean Volunteer Corps Headquarters was the publication of the brochure 『Korean Volunteer University Newspaper. Joseon Volunteer Corps News』 was first published on January 15, 1939. It is presumed that at first the political group was responsible for publication, and after October 1939, the expanded editorial committee took responsibility. Chinese members of the Joseon Volunteer Corps also played a significant role in its publication. They translated various reports and speeches written by Koreans into Chinese.

The purpose of publishing Joseon Volunteer Corps News was to provide a forum for discussion, exchange of experiences, and mutual criticism to develop anti-Japanese activities through the Korea-China alliance. The distribution area of Joseon Volunteer Corps News』 was very wide. It was distributed throughout various theaters and cities, and subscriptions were also possible overseas.

The contents of Joseon Volunteer Corps Newspaper were largely divided into three parts. First, it was about the activities of the Joseon Volunteer Corps. Among them, there was a lot of news about the 1st District's frontline activities. Second, many articles by Chinese people encouraging and advising the activities of the Joseon Volunteer Corps were published. Some were transcriptions of speeches given at commemorative rallies, and some were newly submitted by author. It contained articles sympathizing with the situation of the Korean people, articles praising the resistance movement of the Korean people, and articles expressing gratitude for the activities of the Korean people and the Korean Volunteer Corps in supporting the resistance against China. In addition, practical content, such as methods of propaganda against enemies, was also included. Meanwhile, an article related to the route of the Joseon Volunteer Corps was also published. Writers who had an important influence on setting the route included commander Kim Won-bong, political leaders Kim Seong-suk and Kim Hak-mu.

The method of struggle revealed in Joseon Volunteer Corps Newspaper had a difference in line between the early and late Guilin period. The initial emphasis was on infiltrating the country and organizing anti-Japanese riots. This has been the long-standing line of Korean leftists in China's jurisdiction since the early days of the Heroic Corps. On the other hand, in the latter half of the period, winning over the Korean people in North China and Northeast China was presented as the most important strategy. This change in route is presumed to reflect the results of the Korean 'captive' operation. One of the noteworthy aspects of Joseon Volunteer University Newspaper』 is that wood carvings and prints were consistently published. Joseon Volunteer Corps Newspaper contained many woodblock prints by famous Chinese artists. Because woodblock prints had excellent visual effects, they became a major tool in the anti-Japanese movement.

== Division ==
However, reorganizations were carried out by the Military Committee of the Chinese National Government, and included Park Hyo-sam, Lee Ik-seong (deputy commander of the 3rd district division), Lee Ji-gang (Secretary of the 2nd district division), and Moon Jeong-il (文正一, 3rd division commander of the 2nd district division) was active in the North China region of the Korean Volunteer Corps. In 1941, communist Choi Chang-ik, who was Kim Won- bong's rival within the volunteer corps, worked with the Chinese Communist Party to prevent Kim Won-bong from coming to North China when the volunteer corps moved to North China, and took control of the volunteer corps in North China by putting forward Kim Moo -jeong, Kim Du-bong, and Han Bin. From this point on, the Joseon Volunteer Corps was freed from the influence of Namuisa. The North China Division of the Joseon Volunteer Corps was expanded and reorganized into the Korean Volunteer Army. They are referred to as the Yan'an faction after the establishment of North Korea.

The Korean Liberation Army was founded by the Provisional Government of the Republic of Korea in September 1940, some people participated and some left, reducing the number to 81 in May 1941. Ultimately, at the 28th Cabinet Meeting of the Provisional Government of the Republic of Korea in April 1942, it was decided to incorporate it into the Liberation Army. When Kim Won-bong, who had lost overall control of the volunteer corps, joined the Provisional Government of the Republic of Korea in July 1942, part of the volunteer corps was incorporated into the 1st Zone of the Liberation Army, and Kim Won-bong was inaugurated as the head of the military affairs department.

== See also ==
- Korean Volunteer Army
- Korean Liberation Army
- List of militant Korean independence activist organizations
- Korean Independence Movement

== Bibliography ==
- 『Independence Movement of the Joseon Volunteer Army』 (Yeom In-ho, Nanam, 2001)
- 『Study on the Korean Liberation Army』 (Han Si-jun, Iljogak, 1997)
- 『The History of the Provisional Government of the Republic of Korea』 (Lee Hyeon-hee, Jipmundang, 1982)
- 『Korea Provisional Government Document』 (Library of the National Assembly, 1974)
- 『Joseon Independence Movement』II (Kim Jeong-myeong, Wonseobang, 1967)
- 「Joseon Volunteer Army」 (Yeom In-ho, 『Korean Independence Movement History Dictionary』6, 2004)
- 『The Secret History of the Movement of the People of Joseon』(坪江汕二, Gunamdang Bookstore, 1982)
