= Korean independence movement =

Activism to end the Japanese occupation

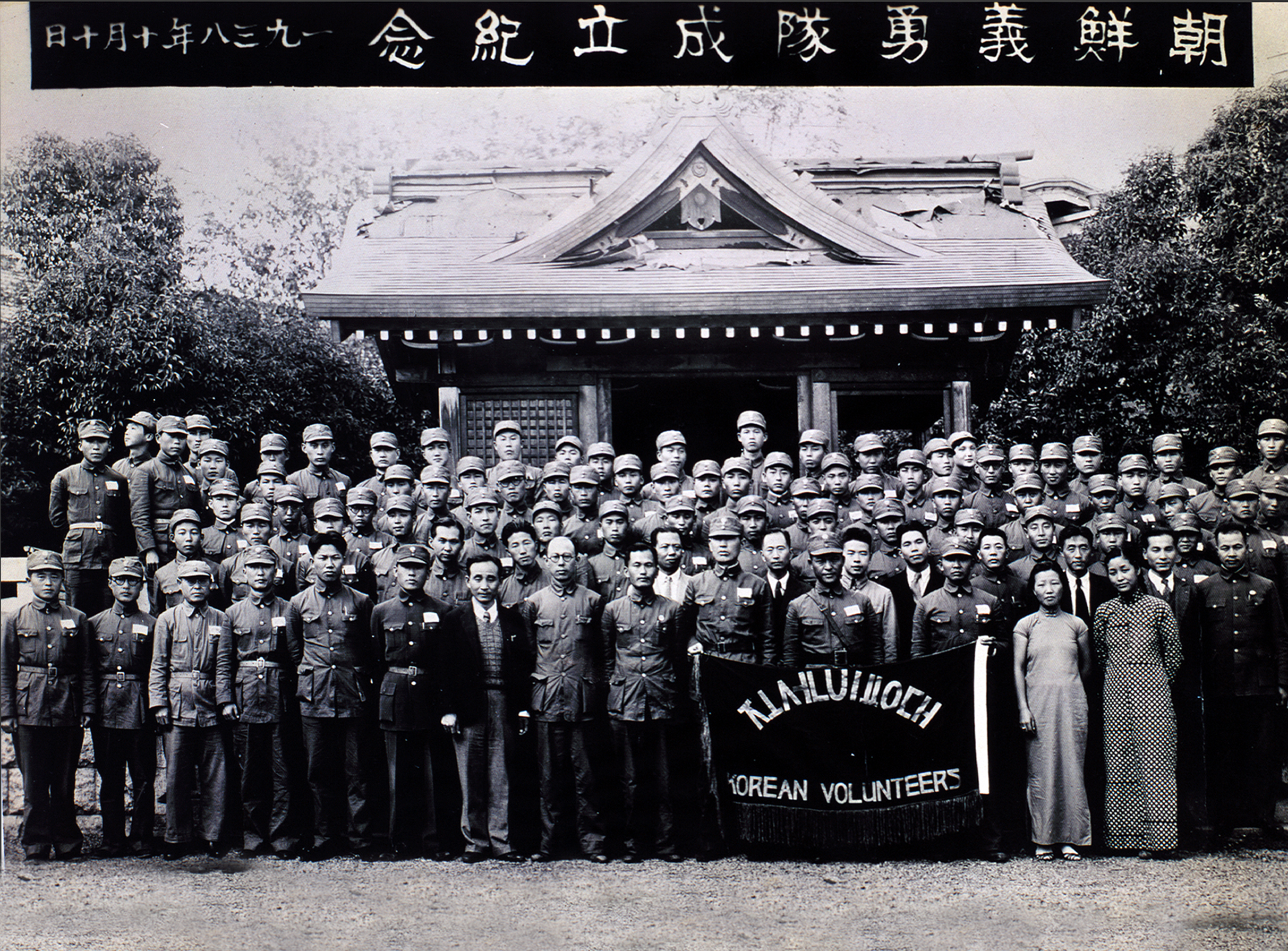
- Korean Volunteer Corps (1938)

Korean name
- Hangul: 항일운동, 독립운동
- Hanja: 抗日運動, 獨立運動
- RR: hangil undong, dongnip undong
- MR: hangil undong, tongnip undong

The Korean independence movement, also known as the Korean Revolution, was a political, cultural, diplomatic, and military movement that sought to end Japanese colonial rule over Korea and restore Korean sovereignty. Independence efforts began around the late 19th century and ended with the surrender of Japan to the Allies in 1945. The movement included several forms of resistance, including peaceful demonstrations, armed uprisings, diplomatic campaigns, educational initiatives, and the most significant event was the March First Movement of 1919. As independence activism on the peninsula was largely suppressed by the Empire of Japan, many significant efforts were conducted abroad by the Korean diaspora, as well as by a number of sympathetic non-Koreans.

During the late nineteenth century and early twentieth century, Japan increased its military and political influence over the Korean Peninsula. Joseon Korea, Tokugawa Japan and Qing China were forced out of their policies of isolationism by the West. Japan then proceeded to rapidly modernize to become a great power in the region. After defeating Qing China in the First Sino-Japanese War and the Russian Empire in the Russo-Japanese War, Japan forcefully opened Korea and established its own hegemony over the peninsula. Eventually, it formally annexed Korea in 1910. The 1919 March First Movement protests are widely seen as a significant catalyst for the international independence movement, although domestically, the protests were violently suppressed. In the aftermath of the protests, thousands of Korean independence activists fled abroad, mostly to Republican China. In April 1919, the Provisional Government of the Republic of Korea (KPG) was founded as a self-proclaimed government in exile in Shanghai.

After the outbreak of the Pacific War in 1941, China became one of the Big Four Allies of World War II. In the Second Sino-Japanese War, China attempted to use this influence to assert Allied recognition of the KPG. However, the United States was skeptical of Korean unity and readiness for independence, preferring an international trusteeship-like solution for the Korean Peninsula. Although China achieved agreement by the Allies on eventual Korean independence in the 1943 Cairo Declaration, continued disagreement and ambiguity about the postwar Korean government lasted until the Soviet–Japanese War of 1945 created a de facto division of Korea into Soviet and American zones, which eventually became North Korea and South Korea respectively.

August 15, the day Japan surrendered in 1945, is celebrated as a holiday in both South Korea and North Korea.

== Background ==
Until the mid 19th century, Qing China, Japan, and Joseon Korea all maintained policies of relative isolationism. Around this time, Joseon was a tributary state of Qing. The Opium Wars during the mid-19th century between China and various Western powers led to the Qing government being forced to sign several unequal treaties, opening up Chinese territory to foreigners. Japan was also forced to open up by the United States via the 1853 to 1854 Perry Expedition. It then underwent the Meiji Restoration and experienced a period of rapid modernization. However, in 1866, Joseon was able to resist an American attempt to open it as well as a French attempt.

Japan eventually succeeded in opening Korea, when it forced Joseon to sign the unequal Japan–Korea Treaty of 1876. Japan then began a process of absorbing Korea into its own sphere of influence over the course of several decades. According to Kirk W. Larsen, by 1882, Japan appeared to be the preeminent power on the peninsula, even over Joseon's formal suzerain, Qing. Japan's hegemony over Korea was further cemented by the Japanese victory in the 1894 to 1895 First Sino–Japanese War. The Treaty of Shimonoseki that ended the war stipulated that Qing would relinquish Joseon from its influence. The Russian Empire then attempted to put Korea in its own sphere of influence, but was soundly defeated in the 1904 to 1905 Russo-Japanese War. By this point, Japan was the unquestioned hegemon over Korea. In 1905, it made Joseon its protectorate, and in 1910, it formally absorbed Korea into its empire.

Meanwhile, shortly after Korea's forced opening, Gojong, the king of Joseon, made efforts to reach out to the United States and various European powers via a number of treaties, foreign exchange student programs, and diplomatic missions. But these overtures often went ignored or forgotten, as the powers prioritized their own interests in Japan and China. Koreans requesting assistance from foreign governments and being ignored became a frequent occurrence even until the end of the Japanese occupation in 1945.

== History ==
=== Before Japanese rule ===
Following Joseon's forced opening, Japan continued to open more and more parts of Korea to exclusive Japanese trade, to the chagrin of the citizens of Joseon as well as Joseon and Qing officials. In some areas of Korea and especially near the port of Wonsan, "small roving bands of Koreans" attacked Japanese people who ventured outside at night.

In 1882, the Imo Incident occurred, in which general anti-foreigner sentiment (especially anti-Japanese) amongst the Joseon Army and later the general citizenry led to the killing of both Korean government officials and members of the Japanese legation.

In 1894, the Donghak Peasant Rebellion occurred. Like the Imo Incident, this rebellion was also generally anti-foreigner, with a focus on Japan. This incident is what sparked the First Sino–Japanese War. The Independence Club, established in April 1896 by Soh Jaipil and other reform minded intellectuals, who advocated for Korean independence.Among other goals, the group advocated for the establishment of a constitutional monarchy. While Gojong initially recognized and tolerated the organization, he eventually disbanded it in December 1898.

Between 1905 and 1912, a number of volunteer guerrilla armies, called "righteous armies" emerged among the Korean populace to fight the Japanese. Around 20,000 volunteers died in these confrontations, which ultimately did not stop the colonization of Korea.

=== Under Japanese rule ===
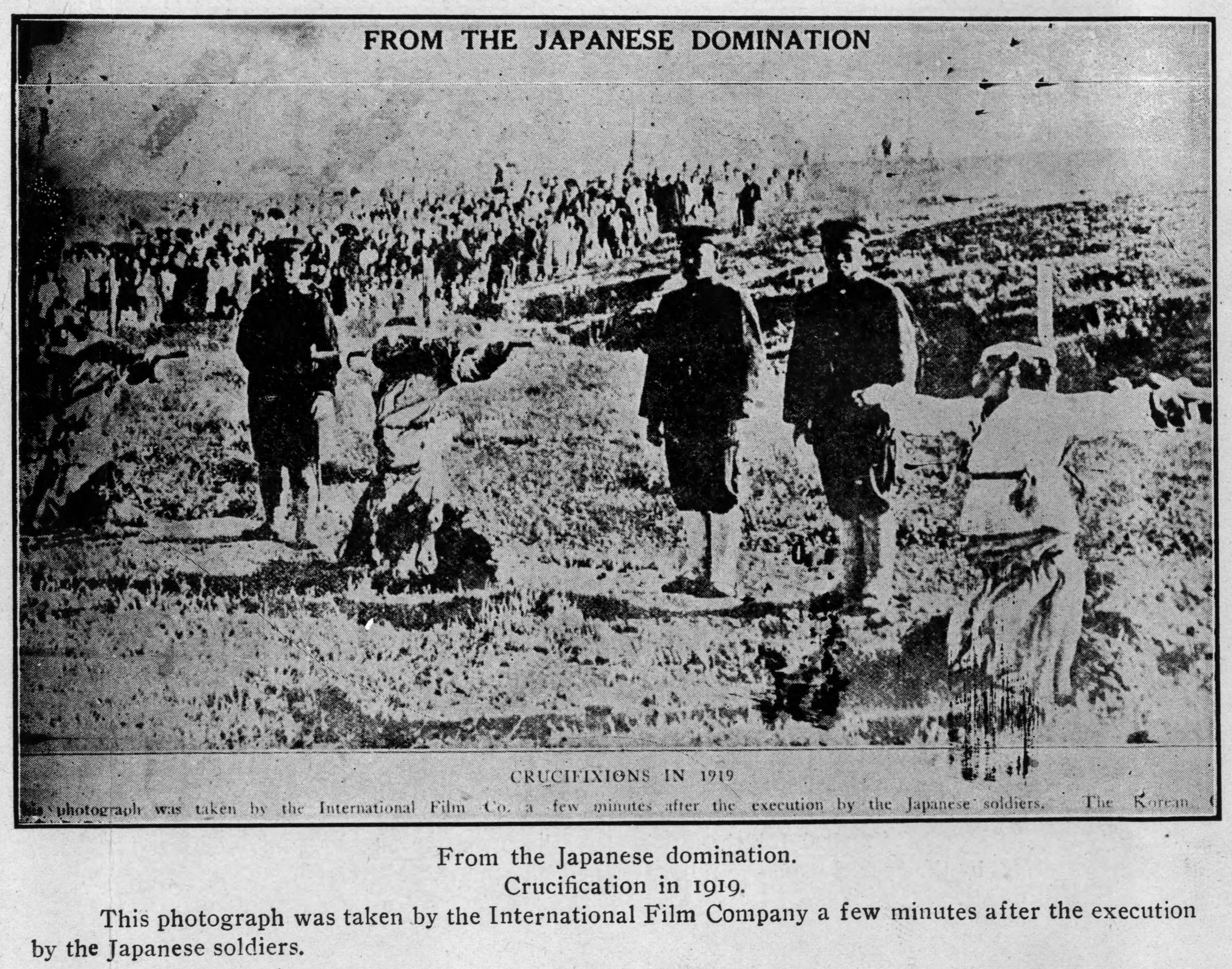
Korean Christians were crucified in the aftermath of the March 1 Movement (1919)

The period of Japanese colonial rule that ensued was oppressive to a far-reaching degree, giving rise to many Korean resistance movements. By 1919 these became nationwide, marked by what became known as the March First Movement, also known as the Samil movement. one of the most significant events in Korean resistance to Japanese colonial rule.

Japanese rule was oppressive but changed over time. Initially, there was very harsh repression and exploitation in the first decade following annexation. Japan's rule was markedly different than in its other colony, Formosa (Taiwan), where the Japanese administration heavily invested in public health, agriculture and infrastructure there. This period in Korea is referred to as amhukki (the dark period) in Korean historiography and common parlance in Korea. Tens of thousands of Koreans were arrested by the Japanese colonial administration for political reasons. The harshness of Japanese rule increased support for the Korean independence movement. Many Koreans left the Korean Peninsula for exile in Manchuria and Primorsky Krai in Russia, some of whom formed resistance groups and societies in Manchuria to fight for Korean independence. Koreans also carried out armed struggles against Japanese forces in Manchuria and Korea.

In 1919 and 1920s, Korean independence army units engaged in resistance activities in Manchuria, which traveled across the Korean-Chinese border, using guerrilla warfare to fight against the Japanese army. At this time, Beom-do Hong's Soviet-backed unit ambushed and annihilated the Imperial Japanese Army that was advancing in the battle of Bongodong (Fengwudong) in Jilin, Manchuria (June 1920). Also, the combined forces of the independence army commanded by Jwa-jin Kim and Beom-do Hong, while repeatedly retreating operationally, ambushed and killed about 1,500 Imperial Japanese soldiers in the battle of Cheongsanri (Qīngshānlǐ). In retaliation to the losses, the Imperial Japanese Army committed the Gando massacre, massacring between 5,000 and tens of thousands of Korean civilians in Gando. Some Koreans even went to Japan, where groups agitated clandestinely alongside Japanese underground socialists and dissidents.

Partly in response to Korean opposition to Japanese colonial policies, this was followed by a relaxation of some of the harsh policies. The former Crown Prince Yi Un married Princess Masako of Nashimoto. The ban on Korean newspapers was lifted, allowing publication of Choson Ilbo and The Dong-A Ilbo. Korean government workers received the same wages as Japanese officials, though the Japanese officials received bonuses the Koreans did not. Corporal punishment such as whippings were eliminated for minor offenses but not for major offences. Laws interfering with burial, slaughtering of animals, peasant markets, or traditional customs were removed or changed.

After the Peace Preservation Law of 1925, some freedoms were restricted. Then, in the lead up to the invasion of China and World War II, the harshness of Japanese rule increased again.

==== Involvement in World War II ====
Although the Empire of Japan had invaded and occupied northeast China from 1931, the Nationalist government of China avoided declaring war on Japan until the empire directly attacked Beijing in 1937, sparking the full phase of Second Sino-Japanese War. After the United States declared war on Japan in 1941, China became an Ally of World War II, and tried to exercise its influence within the group to support Pan-Asian and nationalist movements, which included stipulating a demand of the complete surrender of Japan and immediate independence of Korea afterwards.

In 1937, the Korean National Revolutionary Party and other groups which had been campaigning for independence in China had a joint meeting in Wuhan and established the left-wing Korean National Front Federation (KNF). The Korean Volunteer Corps was formed as an armed force under it. The Korean Volunteer Corps, with Kim Won-bong as its commander-in-chief, was commanded by the Chinese Military Affairs Commission, headed by Chiang Kai-shek, according to the national-communist cooperation. The Korean Volunteer Corps' co-founder was Japanese Anti-War activist Kazuo Aoyama. In addition, Aoyama had served as the Corps' political advisor.

Meanwhile, Nationalist China tried to promote the legitimacy of the Provisional Government of Korea (KPG), which was established by Korean exiles in China after the suppression of the March 1 Movement in Korea. KPG was ideologically aligned with the Chiang Kai-shek government of the time, as independence leader Kim Ku had agreed to Chiang Kai-shek's suggestion to adopt the Chinese Three Principles of the People program in exchange for financial aid. The Chinese Nationalist government in Chongqing tried to unify the warring Korean factions, including the Korean Liberation Army under KPG and the Korean Volunteer Corps under KNF; moreover, Chinese National Military Council decided that "complete independence" for Korea was China's fundamental Korean policy.

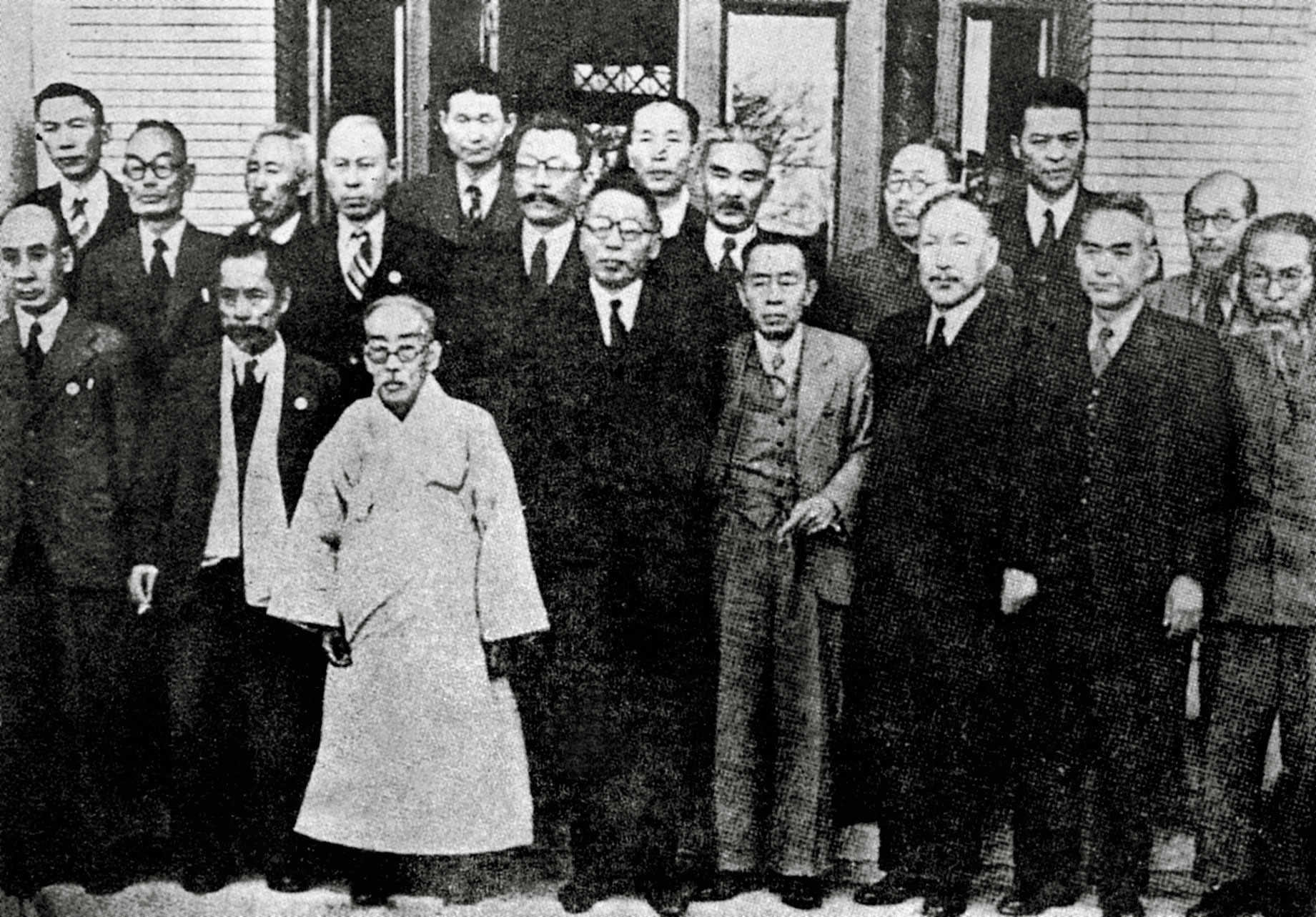
December 3, 1945. A photograph commemorating the return of the Provisional Government leaders

Although Chiang and Korean leaders like Syngman Rhee tried to influence the U.S. State Department to support Korean independence and recognize the KPG, the Far Eastern Division was skeptical. Its argument was that the Korean people "were emasculated politically" after decades of Japanese rule, and showed too much disunity, preferring a condominium solution for Korea that involved the Soviets. China was adamantly opposed to Soviet influence in Korea after hearing about atrocities in Poland following its Soviet takeover in 1939. By the Cairo Conference, the US and China came to agree on Korean independence "in due course", with China still pressing for immediate recognition of the exile government and a tangible date for independence. After Soviet-American relations deteriorated, on August 10, 1945, the United States Department of War agreed that China should land troops in Pusan, Korea from which to prevent a Soviet takeover. However, this turnaround was too late to prevent the division of Korea, as the Red Army quickly occupied northern Korea that same month.

== Ideologies and concerns ==
Although there were many separate political movements against colonial rule, the main ideology or purpose of the movement was to free Korea from the Japanese military and political rule. Koreans were concerned with foreign domination and Korea's state as a colony. They desired to restore Korea's independent political sovereignty after Japan invaded the weakened and partially modernized Korean Empire. This was the result of Japan's political maneuvers to secure international approval for the annexation of treaty annexing Korea.

During the independence movement, the rest of the world viewed the events in Korea as an anti-militarist, anti-Japanese resistance movement. Western colonial powers and the League of Nations largely ignored Korean appeals for self-determination to maintain geopolitical alliances with Imperial Japan. Koreans, however, saw the movement as a step to free Korea from the Japanese colonial rule.

The South Korean government has been criticized as recently as 2011 for not accepting Korean socialists who fought for Korean independence due to fears of violating the National Security Law. Following the division of the peninsula and the Korean War, the South Korean government's aggressive anti-communist policies led to these individuals being excluded from the official registry of national merit.

== Tactics ==
There was no main strategy or tactic that was prevalent throughout the resistance movement, but there were stages where certain tactics or strategies were prominent.

Most of the movement's activities were closed off to the Korean elite class who were co-opted by the Japanese. During this time, militaristic and violent attempts were taken to resist the Japanese including assassinations and bombings. Most of the attempts were disorganized, scattered, and leaderless to prevent arrests and surveillance by the Japanese. In 1909, Korean nationalist An Jung-geun shot and killed former Japanese Prime Minister and the first Resident-General of Korea Itō Hirobumi at the Harbin railway station in China. In 1923, Kim Sang-ok bombed the Namdaemun Police Station in Seoul and engaged in days-long shootout with Japanese police before committing suicide to avoid capture. In 1932, Lee Bong-chang, a member of the Korean Patriotic Organization, threw a hand grenade at Emperor Hirohito's carriage in Tokyo, which missed. In 1932, Yun Bong-gil from the same group as Lee, detonated an improvised explosive device disguised as a water bottle at a Japanese military celebration in Shanghai, China, which killed several high-ranking Japanese officials.

From 1910 to 1919, was a time of education during the colonial era. Many Korean textbooks on grammar and spelling were circulated in schools. It started the trend of intellectual resistance to Japanese colonial rule. This period, along with Woodrow Wilson's progressive principles abroad, created an aware, nationalist, and eager student population. After the March First Movement of 1919, strikes became prominent in the movement. Up to 1945, universities were used as a haven and source of students who further supported the movement. This support system led to the improvement of school facilities. From 1911 to 1937, Korea was dealing with economic problems (with the rest of the world, going through the Great Depression after World War I). There were many labor complaints that contributed to the grievances against Japan's colonial rule. During this period, there were 159,061 disputes with workers concerned with wages and 1018 disputes involving 68,686 farmers in a tenant position. In 1926 the disputes started to increase at a fast pace and movements concerning labor emerged more within the Independence Movement.

== List of groups by type ==
There were broadly three kinds of national liberation groups: (a) the Christian groups which grew out of missionary efforts led by Western missionaries primarily from the United States prior to the Japanese occupation; (b) the former military and the irregular army groups; and (c) business and intellectual expatriates who formed the theoretical and political framework abroad.

=== Religious groups ===
Catholicism arrived in Korea towards the end of the 18th century, facing intense persecution for the centuries afterwards. Methodist and Presbyterian missionaries followed in the 19th century starting off a renaissance with more liberal thoughts on issues of equality and woman's rights, which the strict Confucian tradition would not permit.

The early Korean Christian missionaries both led the Korean independence movement active from 1890 through 1907, and later the creation of a Korean liberation movement from 1907 to 1945. Korean Christians suffered martyrdoms, crucifixions, burnings to death, police interrogations and massacres by the Japanese.

Amongst the major religious nationalist groups were:

- Korean Presbyterian church
- March 1 Movement
- Korean YMCA

=== Militant groups ===
- Donghak Peasant Revolution: Donghak armies were spontaneous countryside uprisings, originally against corruption in the late Joseon dynasty, and later, against Japanese confiscation of lands in Korea.
- Righteous army: Small armies that fought Japanese military police, cavalry, and infantry most intensely from 1907 to 1918, but which carried on till the end of World War II.
- Military Affairs Command
- Korean Independence Army
- Northern Military Administration Office
- Korean Independence Corps
- Korean Revolutionary Army
- Korean Independence Army (1929)
- Korean Volunteer Corps
- Korean Volunteer Army
- Korean Liberation Army: The Armed Forces of the Provisional Government of the Republic of Korea, took part in allied action in China and parts of Southern East Asia such as Burma.
- Korean Patriotic Legion
- Heroic Corps

Supporters of these groups included French, Czech, Chinese, and Russian arms merchants, as well as Chinese nationalist and communist movements.

=== Expatriate and foreign groups ===
Expatriate liberation groups were active in Shanghai, northeast China, parts of Soviet Russia, Hawaii, San Francisco, and Los Angeles. Groups were even organised in areas without many expatriate Koreans, such as the one established in 1906 in Colorado by Park Hee Byung. The culmination of expatriate success was the Shanghai declaration of independence.

- Korean National Association, formed in 1909, despite only have around 6000 Koreans in the United States.
  - Korean National Army Corps, founded in June 1914. (Hawaii)
  - Willows Korean Aviation School
- Young Korean Academy

Philip Jaisohn

Korean Americans Philip Jaisohn (Seo Jae-pil, organized the First Korean Congress in Philadelphia that was attended by over 200 delegates, including Syngman Rhee, and American sympathizers to rally support for Korean independence.

Chinese republican revolutionary Sun Yat-sen was an early supporter of Korean struggles against Japanese occupiers. By 1925, Korean expatriates began to cultivate two-pronged support in Shanghai: from Chiang Kai-Shek's Kuomintang, to early Chinese communist supporters, who later branched into the Chinese Communist Party.

Many foreign Christian missionaries in Korea, such as Frank W. Schofield, risked their own safety to document and publicly exposed Japanese brutality during the March First Movement. U.S. Senators and Representatives such as Selden P. Spencer and George W. Norris openly criticized the Japanese occupation of Korea and introduced resolutions advocating for Korean self-determination.

=== Royalist influence ===
The constant infighting within the Yi family, the nobles, the confiscation of royal assets, the disbanding of the royal army by the Japanese, the execution of seniors within Korea by Japan, comprehensive assassinations of Korean royalty by Japanese mercenaries, and surveillance by Japanese authorities led to great difficulties in royal descendants and their family groups in finding anything but a partial leadership within the liberation movement. A good many of the righteous army commanders were linked to the family but these generals and their righteous army groups were largely dead by 1918, and cadet members of the families contributed towards establishing both republics post-1945.

== See also ==
- June 10th Movement
- Gwangju Student Independence Movement
- Battle of Qingshanli
- Battle of Fengwudong
- Eagle Project
- February 8 Declaration of Independence
- Hague Secret Emissary Affair
- Hongkou Park Incident
- Independence Club
- National Liberation Day of Korea
- Minjok jeonggi
- Korea Review (1919)
- Korean Declaration of Independence
- Korean Language Society incident
- Korean People's Association in Manchuria
- Sakuradamon incident (1932)
- Korean reunification
