= Kim Wŏnbong =

Korean anarchist (1898–c. 1958)

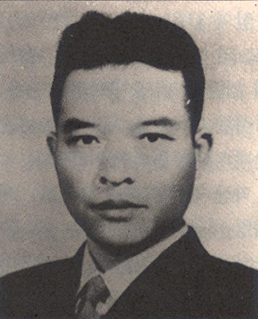

2nd Minister of Labor
- In office 8 May 1952 – 20 September 1957
- Premier: Kim Il Sung
- Preceded by: Ho Song-taek
- Succeeded by: Kim Ung-gi

1st Minister of State Control
- In office 9 September 1948 – 8 May 1952
- Premier: Kim Il Sung
- Preceded by: Post established
- Succeeded by: Choe Chang-ik

Personal details
- Born: 1898 Miryang, South Gyeongsang, Korean Empire
- Died: c.17 November 1958 (aged 59–60) North Korea
- Party: Workers' Party of Korea
- Other political affiliations: Korean National Revolutionary Party
- Spouse(s): Park Cha-jeong; Choi Dong-Seon
- Children: Kim Cheol-Geon; Kim Joong-Geon; Kim Hak-Bong
- Occupation: Politician, military general

Military service
- Allegiance: Korea
- Branch/service: Korean Volunteer Corps (1937–1941); Korean Liberation Army (1941–1945)
- Years of service: 1937–1945
- Rank: General
- Battles/wars: World War II

Korean name
- Hangul: 김원봉
- Hanja: 金元鳳
- RR: Gim Wonbong
- MR: Kim Wŏnbong

Art name
- Hangul: 약산
- Hanja: 若山
- RR: Yaksan
- MR: Yaksan

Kim Wŏnbong (Korean: 김원봉; Hanja: 金元鳳; 1898 – c. 1958), also known by his art name Yaksan (약산; 若山), was a Korean independence activist, anarchist militant and politician. In 1919, Kim established the Heroic Corps, an anarchist group which carried out a six-year campaign of attacks against Japanese officials. In 1935, he established the Korean National Revolutionary Party, which formed part of a united front with other Korean radical groups, and commanded its military detachment, the Korean Volunteer Corps. After the liberation of Korea, he initially moved to South Korea, but defected to North Korea after receiving death threats from members of the Syngman Rhee government. He then served in the 1st Cabinet of North Korea as head of the State Inspection Commission and Minister of Labor. After the Korean War, the North Korean government accused him of subversive activities and purged him.

== Biography ==
=== Early life ===
Kim Wŏnbong was born in 1898, in Miryang, in the South Gyeongsang Province of the Korean Empire. He was born to father Kim Chu-ik (김주익; 金周益) and mother Yi Kyŏng-nyŏm (이경념; 李京念) and into the Gimhae Kim clan. In his youth, he studied at a seodang, a traditional Korean school. In 1908, he enrolled in a modern-style school. In 1910, he attended the Donghwa Middle School (동화중학; 同和中學). In 1913, he attended a school in Seoul. In 1916, he was in China, learning the German language. In 1918, he enrolled in the University of Nanking. In February 1919, he entered the Sinhŭng Military Academy and underwent military education for six months, after which he dropped out of the academy.

=== Militant activism ===
Kim moved to Manchuria, where he established the Heroic Corps in December 1919. The group sought the destruction of the Empire of Japan and the independence of Korea. Inspired by the political philosophy of anarchism, Kim led six years of armed resistance against Japan. During this period, the group out a number of terrorist attacks, including assassinations of Japanese officials and attacks on military bases. In January 1923, Kim and fellow Heroic Corps member Yu Ja-myeong influenced Sin Ch'aeho's conversion to anarchism when they convinced him to write his "Declaration of the Korean Revolution".

By the 1930s, Kim's group was collaborating with the Chinese Nationalist government, which gave them military training and political education. Over the course of the 1930s, Kim's political outlook moved towards socialism. In 1935, Kim established the Korean National Revolutionary Party (KNRP), which largely distributed anti-Japanese propaganda. During this time, Kim's anarchist communist faction of the Korean independence movement began to clash with Kim Ku's right-wing nationalist faction.

On 12 November 1937, Kim met with Yu Ja-meyong and Kim Seongsuk to discuss the formation of a united front with other radical organisations, including Yu's anarchist League of Korean Revolutionaries and Kim Seongsuk's Marxist Alliance for Korean National Liberation Movement. In December 1937, they established the League for the Korean National Front (LKNF). In 1938, Kim Wŏnbong was appointed as commander-in-chief of its military branch, the Korean Volunteer Corps (KVC), which later merged together with other pro-independence forces, forming the Korean Liberation Army.

=== Political career ===
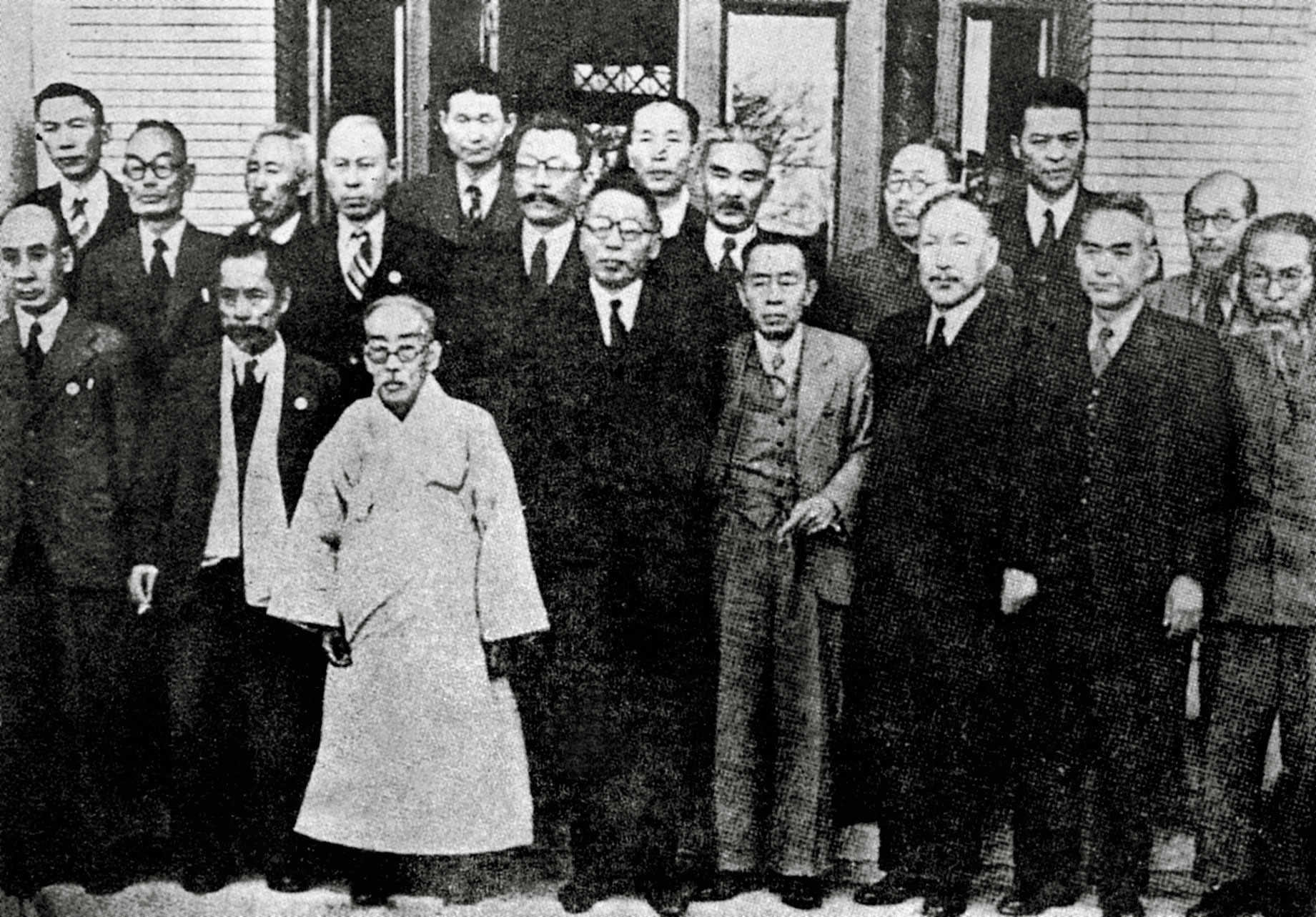
The return of the Korean Provisional Government leaders, including Kim Wonbong (back row, second from right), on 3 December 1945

Following the liberation of Korea, Kim moved back to South Korea (then under United States occupation) and threw his support behind Syngman Rhee's government. He had initially decided against moving to the Soviet-occupied north, due to his opposition to orthodox Stalinism. But when right-wing and collaborationist elements in Rhee's government began to threaten Kim's life, in April 1948, he decided to defect to North Korea out of self-preservation. There he joined the Workers' Party of North Korea and became a close collaborator of Kim Il Sung, helping to establish the country's communist government.

Kim was elected to the 1st Supreme People's Assembly, and served as its first Vice Chairman. He also served in the cabinet as head of the State Inspection Commission and Minister of Labor, and as a commanding officer in the Korean People's Army. In 1950, Kim collaborated in the invasion of South Korea, which began the Korean War; after the war, Kim Il Sung awarded him with the Medal for Military Merit". By this time, Kim had adjusted his anarchist political philosophy to fit in with the state's prevailing ideology of Marxism-Leninism. In a 1955 article for Kulloja, Kim wrote of the importance of persuasion and education in the establishment of a new society in North Korea. He emphasised that the wellbeing of the working class ought to be a central consideration for the ruling Workers' Party, which he believed should build its new society in accordance with the will of the masses.

During the mid-1950s, debates flared up within the party around de-Stalinization and Kim Il Sung's cult of personality, during which Kim Wŏnbong had allegedly expressed concern about the building of a one-party state in North Korea. He became a target for a subsequent purge of elements perceived as hostile to the leader's consolidation of power. In a report to the Soviet embassy on 17 November 1958, the party leadership announced that Kim Wŏnbong had been purged, claiming he was an agent of the United States and that he had attempted to support the UN offensive into North Korea.

In March 1959, an article allegedly written by Kim was published in Kulloja, in which he praised the Central Committee of the Workers' Party of Korea and its "Great Leader" for improving the country's transportation infrastructure. Following this article's publication, his name disappeared from the public record.

== Legacy ==
Historian Benjamin Young noted Kim Wŏnbong as an example of Korean anarchists, who did not fit neatly into the communist ideological box, who had fled political repression in South Korea. South Korean historians have conducted scant research into the defection of anarchists – including Kim Wŏnbong, Ri Kiyŏng and Hong Myong-hui – to North Korea. Kim remains a controversial figure in South Korea due to his defection to the North, although he has been celebrated by some South Koreans for his struggle against the Empire of Japan. During a speech for Memorial Day, on 6 June 2019, South Korean president Moon Jae-in paid tribute to Kim and other anarchist leaders of the Korean independence movement. This drew criticism from South Korean conservatives, who viewed Kim as a traitor.

== Bibliography ==
- Hwang, Dongyoun (2016). Anarchism in Korea: Independence, Transnationalism, and the Question of National Development, 1919-1984. Albany, New York: SUNY Press. ISBN 978-1-4384-6167-0. OCLC 1039293708.
- Kim, Nam-sik (2023). 김원봉 (金元鳳) [Kim Won-bong]. Encyclopedia of Korean Culture (in Korean). Academy of Korean Studies.
- Young, Benjamin (2021). "Dangerous Ideas and Leftist Deviation: Anarchism and North Korean Political Culture". Journal for the Study of Radicalism. 15 (2): 49–72. JSTOR 48642381.
