= Korean National Revolutionary Party =

1935–1947 pro-independence organization

Korean National Revolutionary Party 조선민족혁명당
- Abbreviation: KNRP
- Leader: Kim Won-bong
- Founder: Kim Kyu-sik; Kim Won-bong; Cho So-ang
- Founded: 1935
- Dissolved: 1947
- Armed wing: Korean National Revolutionary Party Army (1935); Korean Volunteer Corps (1938)
- Ideology: Korean nationalism; Left-wing nationalism; Three Principles of the Equality
- Political position: Left-wing

Party flag

The Korean National Revolutionary Party (Korean: 조선민족혁명당; Hanja: 朝鮮民族革命黨), or KNRP, was a nationalist party formed by exiles in Shanghai in 1935 to resist the Japanese occupation of Korea. At first it was the main nationalist Korean political party, but as the Sino-Japanese War (1937–45) progressed the rival Korean National Party, later Korea Independence Party, gained more influence with the Chinese Nationalist government in Chongqing and came to dominate the Korean Provisional Government. The KNRP of America was a significant factor as a source of funds and a link to the US government. The KNRP was dissolved in 1947.

== Foundation ==
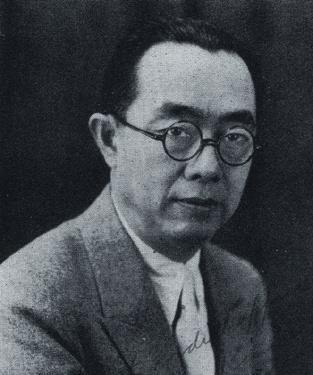
Kim Kyu-sik, one of the founders

After the First Sino-Japanese War of 1894–95 Japan' influence in Korea rose steadily. Japan fully annexed Korea in 1910. The Korean Provisional Government (KPG) was established in Shanghai on 11 April 1919, with Syngman Rhee designated premier. The KPG was pulled apart by disagreements between Communists, liberal democrats and rightists. After the Japanese occupied Manchukuo in 1931 the Chinese government lent support to Korean nationalists. The Korean Anti-Japanese Front Unification League was created on 10 November 1932, but disagreements persisted.

In an attempt to form a unified front, the Korean National Revolutionary Party (KNRP) was formed in Shanghai in 1935 through a grouping of left-wing nationalist Korean parties. Organizers were Kim Kyu-sik, Kim Won-bong and Jo So-ang. The strongest of the founding groups was the Uiyǒldan, whose leader Kim Won-bong became leader of the new party. It had a military front with the goal of ending Japanese imperialist rule. When it joined the KNRP the Korean Revolutionary Party had a small army. with about 400 weapons and 1,000 members. About 200 of its soldiers stayed behind in Manchuria. The KNRP's political program justified arming the masses for armed resistance in its organ The National Revolution as follows:

The national unification front cannot be controlled by the "isms" or political program of any particular class. If, under circumstances such as the present when the "isms" and political programs are opposing each other, we try to control everyone with the "ism" or political program of a particular class, we shall end up with one particular class exercising dictatorship over the nation or with all the members of the nation except for that particular class excluded from the united front of the national movement.

== Pre-war period (1935–1937) ==
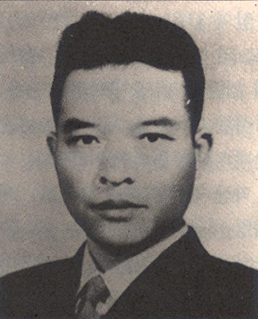
Kim Won-bong, the main leader

From 1933 onward the Chinese Nationalist government had repeatedly given in to Japanese demands, including the June 1935 He–Umezu Agreement to remove objectionable troops and officials. The KNRP decided to send trained agents into Korea, North China and Manchuria to create confusion through assassination of Japanese officials and destruction of installations. Fifteen agents were sent to Manchuria in March 1936, and later that year forty or fifty more agents were sent to Korea, North China and Manchuria.

There were tensions between Kim Won-bong and Yi Chong-chon, head of the KNRP military department. Kim Won-bong had more influence in Nanjing, but Yi Chong-chon had more power in Manchuria. Yi Chong-chon was ideologically closer to the rightist Kim Ku than he was to Kim Won-bong. In August 1936 an unauthorized plot by Kim Won-bong to use bombs against the Kuomintang government and the Japanese was discovered. Yi Chong-chon's supporters used the incident to try to expel Kim Won-bong from the KNRP.

In October–November 1935 Kim Ku's followers and others who had refused to join the united front or who had defected from it began to meet as the "Temporary Session of the Legislative Assembly of the Provisional Government", and formed a cabinet of ministers. The Provisional Government (KPG) attacked the KNRP and formed a new party, the Korean National Party, with Kim Ku at its head. The KPG favored a diplomatic approach as opposed to guerrilla action and was aligned with the United States, while the KNRP was aligned with the Soviet Union. The Provisional Government and Korean National Party had few followers and achieved little before 1937. In 1937 a leftist wing of the KNRP split off to form the Korean National Front headed by Choe Chang-ik and others. (Note: In 1941–42 the Korean National Front established contact with the Chinese Communist Party in Yan'an and joined up with Korean Communists who had been active in North China.)

== Sino-Japanese War (1937–1945) ==
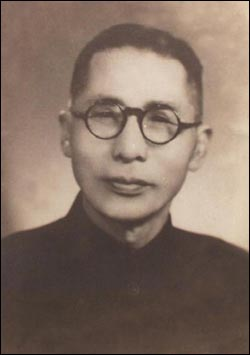
Kim Ku, leader of the rightist opposition to the KNRP

Hostilities between Japan and China began with the Marco Polo Bridge Incident on 7 July 1937. At this time, the two main Korean exile parties were the rightist Korea Independence Party, or KIP, supported by Kim Ku, Jo So-ang, and Chi Ch'ŏngch'ŏn and the leftist Korean National Revolutionary Party (KNRP) led by Kim Yak-san and Kim Kyu-sik. On 10 July 1937, the Chinese government invited Kim Won-bang, Kim Ku, and other Korean leaders to a conference at Lushan where the Koreans accepted an offer of large amounts of money and agreed to support a united front against Japan.

In September, the Korean leaders were called again and asked to mobilize young Koreans for intelligence duties. On 1 December 1937, eighty-three young Korean men were enrolled in the particular training unit of the Shengtze Military Academy in Nanjing. The majority were from the KNRP. The Chinese government abandoned Shanghai on 8 November 1937 and Nanking on 13 December 1937. Most Koreans of both main parties followed the government in its retreat. Before this, they had formed a federation. In May 1938, there was an unsuccessful attempt to assassinate Kim Ku. The power of the right-wing nationalists declined after this until 1940. The KNRP established the Korean Volunteer Corps as its military organization in October 1938, which, in practice, was controlled by the Chinese National Military Council.

In May 1939, the two Korean leaders issued an "Open Letter to Comrades and Compatriots" in which they confessed that they had been wrong in failing to unite in the past and called on all Koreans to join. They advocated merging all the existing organizations into a single new united organization. However, their followers on the left and right resisted unification. The KIP established the Korean Restoration Army (KRA) in September 1939, which Kim Ku wanted to keep as an independent unit, without first obtaining approval from the Chinese government.

The Chinese government wanted to bring the KIP and KNRP together. When this proved difficult, from 1941 onward, they came to favor Kim Ku's KIP. In the summer of 1941, some members of the KNRP and its military arm, the Korean Volunteers Corps, moved to the Chinese Communist Party revolutionary base area in Northwestern China. Although the Chinese Nationalist government did not consider the KNRP a radical organization, they began favoring Kim Ku's group. In the 1940s, the KNRP, whose members were generally younger and more progressive exiles, challenged the authority of the Korean Provisional Government (KPG) in Chongqing. There were reports that Kim Ku had "accepted arrangements from the Chinese government which restricted the Korean revolutionary movement in return for a monthly subsidy." The KNRP gained support from the Chinese to form the Korean Restoration Army, which had 3,600 men in 1943. The army was held in rear areas but, to a limited extent, engaged in propaganda, intelligence, and guerrilla activities.

In October 1942, two leftists were admitted to the National Council of the Provisional Government in Chongqing, Kim Kyu-sik and Chang Kon-sang. The leftists were uncooperative, and a constitutional revision was delayed until April 1944. In the following elections, the Korea Independence Party won eight seats on the council, the KNRP won four chairs, and one seat each went to the Korean People's Liberation League and an anarchist. Kim Ku remained president, Kim Kyu-sik was vice president, and Kim Won-bong was appointed Minister of Military Affairs.

== Post-war (1945–1947) ==
After the defeat of Japan the US and Soviet Union agreed on a temporary partition of Korea with the 38th parallel as the dividing line until a unified Korean government could be established. Kim Kyu-sik met Kim Il Sung of North Korea and urged him to support a unified, independent Korea. At a conference in Moscow in December 1945 at was agreed to place Korea under a trusteeship for up to five years, an agreement strongly opposed by Koreans of all political orientations. Syngman Rhee emerged as the moderate and conservative leader in the south, while Kim Il Sung was supported by the Russians in the north. The KNRP was dissolved in 1947.

== United States ==
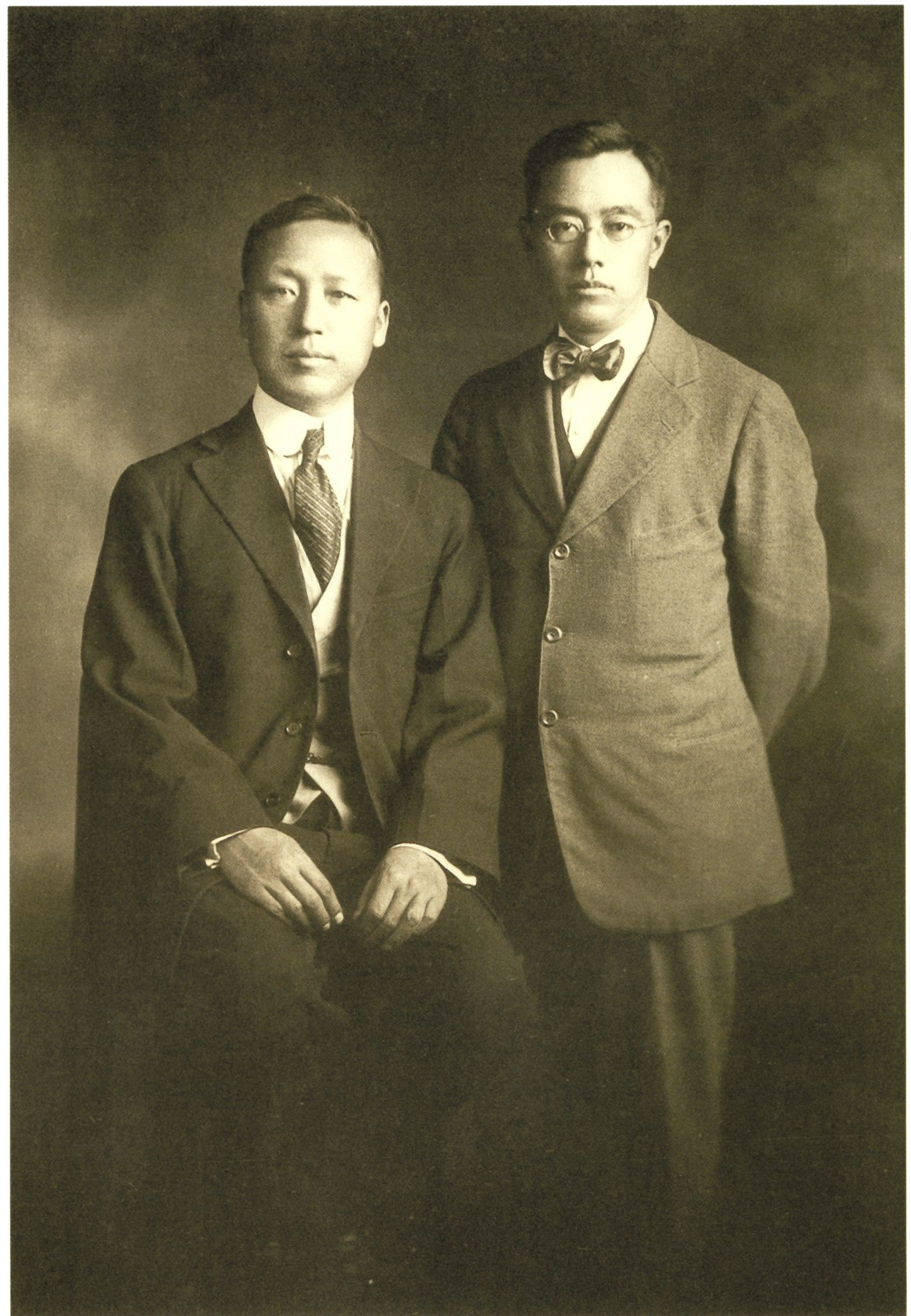
Syngman Rhee (left) and Kim Kyu-sik (right) in Shanghai, 1919

A group of Korean students in Southern California began to meet in what became known as the Friday Forum just before the outbreak of the Sino-Japanese war to discuss the situation. They came to the conclusion that the future of Korea lay with the Communist bloc, not with the US and Western capitalist countries. They eventually became the North American affiliate of the KNRP, raising money to arm Korean revolutionaries in China and encouraging members to volunteer for the Korean Restoration Army.

In the US the Korean National Association (KNA) and most established Korean immigrants supported the rightist Korean Independence Party. The KNRP and the Sino-Korean People's League, established in Hawaii in the early 1930s, represented the small leftist minority of Korean Americans. Its supporters engaged in fundraising to help military efforts in China and staged protests against Japan. Soon Hyun (1879–1968) founded and became chairperson of the Hawaiian branch of the KNRP. In 1940 he worked closely with Kim Kyu-sik and Kim Ku in Chongqing. In 1946, after Korea had been liberated from Japan and placed under an American military government, Soon Hyun was denied permission to return to Korea, probably because of his position in the party.

The Methodist clergyman Lee Kyungsun headed the China Aid Society, Korean Volunteers Corps Aid Society in China and the American Branch (Los Angeles) of the KNRP, organizations that were in favor of armed action. He later joined the American Communist Party, and in 1949 returned to North Korea. Kilsoo Haan of the Hawaiian Sino-Korean People's League tried to associate himself with the KNRP on the mainland, but they did not take him seriously. Dr. Syngman Rhee, who claimed to represent the KPG, would not cooperate with Kilsoo Haan. American intelligence agencies doubted the motives and authority of Kilsoo Haan, and were not sure whether any of the exiles would be able to establish a viable government in Korea after Japan had been defeated.

In the spring of 1941 the United Korean Committee in America (UKC) was formed to unify all Korean groups in the United States and Hawaii. The UKC mandate was to support the KPG in China and Syngman Rhee, director of the KPG's Korean Commission in Washington, D.C. The UKC understood that since Koreans in the US were classified as Japanese nationals their status would be uncertain when the US entered the war against Japan. It made clear that the organization was, "voluntarily motivated by patriotism and furthermore of war efforts against Japan" and would assist the United Nations in recovering Korean independence.

The UKC included the Korean National Associations of North America and Hawaii and the Central Headquarters of Tongjihoe of Hawaii with the smaller Sino-Korean People's League of Hawaii, Korean Independence Party, KNRP of Los Angeles, Korean Women's Patriotic Society of Los Angeles, Korean Women's Relief Society of Hawaii and Korean Independence League of Hawaii. The member groups remained intact and continued their internal programs, but the UKC was to administer all political and diplomatic activities of the Korean independence movement.

The KNRP provided funds to the Korean Christian Association, which sent care packages to Korean Americans who had joined the military, as did the Korean Methodist Church of Los Angeles (KMCLA). The KNRP of America began to publish a weekly paper in English and Korean on 6 October 1943. Korean Independence was produced in Los Angeles on premises on West Jefferson Boulevard. Diamond Kimm (Note: Kimm was later deported for refusing to deny that he was Communist.) was the general manager. Kilsoo Haan contributed articles to the paper that reflected his leftist and Christian views. The organization worked for Korean independence during the Pacific War, and often published editorials that supported America's efforts in the struggle against Japan. After the war ended in August 1945 the paper began to publish editorials opposed to the American military government in South Korea. An editorial on 16 July 1947 said:

Of course, for those Americans in Southern Korea who are practicing ABC of imperialism—divide and rule, the collapse of the U.S.-U.S.S.R. Joint Commission must be tantamount to scratching one's itching back. For they know the success of the Joint Commission's work in establishing a democratic Korean provisional government based on the Moscow Decision will mean the dawn of a new Korea for the Korean people, by the Korean people ... And it will mean the death knell to those pro-Japanese Korean collaborators, national traitors, pro-fascists, reactionaries, blood-sucking profiteers who are the proteges of the AMG (American Military Government) in Southern Korea and through whom the hounds of American monopoly capitalists are conspiring converting Korea into the Second Philippines and Greece.

The Federal Bureau of Investigation (FBI) and the Immigration and Naturalization Service placed the party under surveillance. The FBI, Immigration and Naturalization Service and the House Un-American Activities Committee began harassing the Friday Forum leaders, deporting or imprisoning them. The last Friday Forum leader left for North Korea in 1957 and the movement disbanded.

== Program ==
The party adopted a 17-point platform very similar to that of the Uiyǒldan. The first point was to defeat Japan and regain independence. Other points covered freedoms, rights, democracy and social programs, and also nationalization of land and large enterprises and national economic planning. They were:

1. Destroy the exploiting forces of the enemy Japan and complete the independence of our people
2. Purge all feudal and other anti-revolutionary forces and establish a democratic regime
3. Eliminate the economic system under which the minority exploits the majority, and establish a system in which all citizens may maintain equal livelihood
4. Execute local autonomy based on prefectures
5. Arm the entire nation
6. Institute an equal suffrage for all and the right to be elected
7. Grant the people freedom of speech, assembly, publication, organization and faith
8. Grant equal rights to women
9. Institute nationalization of land and distribute the land to the farmers
10. Nationalize large-scale industries and monopoly enterprises
11. Institute economic national planning
12. Protect free movement of labor
13. Institute a progressive tax system
14. Operate national compulsory education and professional education
15. Establish old people's homes, nurseries, and relief organizations as public institutions
16. Confiscate all properties of national traitors and public and private properties of the Japanese in Korea
17. Maintain close liaison with and support the liberation movement of the world's oppressed peoples according to the principles of freedom, equality and mutual assistance.

== See also ==
- Blue Shirts Society, a Chinese anti-communist organization, but supported KNRP before Second China Civil War.
