= Kim Sang-ok (independence activist) =

Korean independence activist (1889–1923)

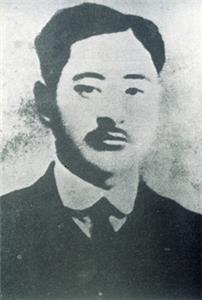
- Born: January 5, 1889
- Died: January 22, 1923 (aged 34); Hyoje-dong, Jongno District, Keijō, Keiki-dō, Korea, Empire of Japan
- Cause of death: Suicide

Korean name
- Hangul: 김상옥
- Hanja: 金相玉
- RR: Gim Sangok
- MR: Kim Sangok

Kim Sang-ok (Korean: 김상옥, January 5, 1889 – January 22, 1923) was a Korean independence activist.

== Biography ==
Kim was born on January 5, 1889.

At the age of 20, Dongheung Night School was established and the education movement began by Kim Sang Ok. He discussed issues related to national independence with Lee Jong-so and Lim Yong-ho.

When March 1st Movement took place, he organized a secret reform group with Yun Ik-jung and Shin Hwa-soo. He also published and distributed Innovation Notice. And in the spring of 1920, he met Kim Dong-soon, who came in from Manchuria, and planned to launch an independence movement with direct action, including the formation of an assassination squad to destroy the enemy's institutions.

He returned to Korea in 1921 and carried out the mission of collecting military funds and spying for the country. In the winter of 1922, he entered Seoul with his comrades, Ahn Hong-han and Oh Bok-young, carrying weapons such as bombs, pistols, and live ammunition.

He later defected to Shanghai, China, in October that year and avoided tracing by Japanese police that year. There, he developed a struggle for national independence by interacting with the governors of China through guidance and introduction of temporary government factors such as Kim Gu and Lee Si-young.

Then on January 12 the following year, he was in hiding after throwing a bomb at the Jongno Police Station. On January 22, 1923, Kim ran around the roof of a civilian house surrounded by some 1,000 Japanese military police officers in Hyoje-dong, central Seoul, and fought a three-hour gun battle before killing himself with one remaining bullet.
