= Chengdu University =

Provincial public university in Chengdu, China

Coordinates: 30.6495°N 104.1880°E

- 成都大学 (Chinese)
- Motto: 自爱，自修，自尊，自强。
- Type: Public
- Established: 1978
- Location: Chengdu, Sichuan, China
- Website: cdu.edu.cn en.cdu.edu.cn

Chinese name
- Simplified Chinese: 成都大学
- Traditional Chinese: 成都大學
Transcriptions
Standard Mandarin
- Hanyu Pinyin: Chéngdū Dàxué

Chengdu University (CDU; 成都大学) is a provincial public university located in Chengdu, Sichuan, China. It is affiliated with the Province of Sichuan, and co-sponsored by the Sichuan Provincial People's Government and the Chengdu Municipal People's Government. The university is accredited to confer bachelor's and master's degrees.

== History ==
Chengdu University was established in December 1978. It originally offered bachelor's degree programs, but in 1983, it transitioned to offering only associate's education. In May 2003, the university resumed its status as an undergraduate institution and was renamed Chengdu College. It is venue for the Universiade.

In 2006, Chengdu College incorporated Chengdu Education College, Sichuan Provincial Chengdu Health School, and Sichuan Provincial Chengdu Kindergarten Normal School. In April 2010, the Chengdu Railway Central Hospital was assigned to Chengdu College as an affiliated hospital. In August 2013, all state-owned assets of the Sichuan Antibiotic Industry Research Institute were transferred to Chengdu College free of charge.

On November 30, 2018, the Ministry of Education approved the renaming of Chengdu College to Chengdu University.

== Campus ==
As of March 2023, the university's campuses cover more than 2300 acres, with a building area of approximately 992,100 square meters. The total value of teaching and research equipment is 515 million yuan. The library holds a collection of more than 2.52 million paper books and 952,000 electronic journals. The university has 19 colleges, offering 72 undergraduate majors. It grants nine master's degree programs in various disciplines and 16 categories of professional master's degrees. The university has a faculty of 1,721 full-time teachers, and more than 27,000 full-time students (including over 2,200 graduate students).
