= Heroic Corps =

1919–1928 Korean pro-independence group

- Leader: Kim Won-bong
- Dates active: 9 November 1919–1928
- Country: Korea, Empire of Japan
- Allegiance: Korean independence movement
- Headquarters: Shanghai
- Ideology: Anarchism

Korean name
- Hangul: 의열단
- Hanja: 義烈團
- RR: Uiyeoldan
- MR: Ŭiyŏltan

The Heroic Corps (Korean: 의열단; Hanja: 義烈團 (Note: Also translated as the Righteous Group.)) was a militant anarchist Korean independence activist organization during the Japanese colonial period. Founded in 1919, its activists believed in revolutionary uprising and egalitarianism.

After the March First Movement was crushed in 1919, many independence activists moved their bases to foreign countries. Members of the Heroic Corps thought that those organizations were too moderate and would not contribute to independence in Korea. They took a more radical approach by opposing compromises such as culturalism. The Heroic Corps wished for a violent revolution, reflected the Manifesto of the Korean Revolution (조선혁명선언) by independence activist Shin Chae-ho. The Corps struggled for independence by assassinating high-ranking Japanese officials and committing acts of terrorism against government offices. The Heroic Corps moved their base to Beijing, China, and brought members to Shanghai, totaling about 70 members in 1924. Kim Ku, Kim Kyu-sik, Kim Chang-suk, and Shin Chae-ho were engaged as advisers. President of the Republic of China Chiang Kai-shek supported the Heroic Corps.

== Goals ==
Leading the Corps was a 22-year-old man, Kim Won-bong (1898 – c. 1958). The organization was based on ten articles of resolution, which listed seven types of individuals who must be killed and five governmental structures that must be destroyed. Their aims were to defeat the Japanese invaders (구축왜노; 驅逐倭奴), gain independence for Korea (광복조국; 光復祖國), abolish class distinctions (타파계급; 打破階級), and establish equal rights to arable land (평균지권; 平均地權). Their ideals displayed a new wave of revolutionary public activity in the fight for independence in direct response to the March 1st Movement (Korean: 3.1운동; Hanja: 三一運動).

== Attacks ==
The Heroic Corps carried out their plan for the assassination of Japanese ministers and the destruction of public offices in March 1920. They attempted to carry bombs into Korea. Kwak Jae-ki sent bombs from Manchuria to Kim Byung-wan that Japanese police confiscated in Gyeonggi Province. Kwak Jae-ki and 12 others were arrested by Japanese police.

On 12 January 1923, bombs were thrown into the Jongno Police station. On 17 January, Japanese police searched Sampanong (삼판통; 三坂通), Kim Sang-ok's refuge. Surrounded by 20 police officers, Kim Sang-ok exchanged gunfire, killing the head of the criminal division and wounding several other police officers. He escaped the siege to hide on Namsan Mountain, disguising himself as a monk, and hid in Lee Hye-soo's house in Hyoje-dong (효제동; 孝悌洞). On 22 January, several hundred armed policemen besieged the house. By himself, Kim Sang-ok resisted the Japanese for over three hours. He killed several policemen before committing suicide with his last bullet. Japanese police authorities did not identify Kim Sang-ok as the bomber until after he had died.

On 28 December 1926, at 2 p.m., Na Seok-ju entered Joseon Siksan Bank (조선식산은행; 朝鮮殖産銀行) and threw one bomb. Later that day, he attacked the Oriental Development Company (동양척식주식회사; 東洋拓殖株式會社) by throwing bombs and firing a gun at random, killing several people. Five Japanese policemen chased him, and he ultimately used his gun to kill himself and avoid arrest.
