= Song Jin-woo =

Song Jin-woo may refer to:

- Song Jin-woo (journalist) (1889–1945)
- Song Jin-woo (baseball) (born 1966)
- Song Jin-woo (actor) (born 1985)
