= Gungjeong-dong =

Neighborhood in Seoul, South Korea

- Interactive map of Gungjeong-dong
- Coordinates: 37°35′5″N 126°58′22″E
- Country: South Korea

Area
  - Total: 0.07 km^{2} (0.027 sq mi)

Korean name
- Hangul: 궁정동
- Hanja: 宮井洞
- RR: Gungjeong-dong
- MR: Kungjŏng-dong

Gungjeong-dong (Korean: 궁정동) is a dong (neighborhood) of Jongno District, Seoul, South Korea. It is a legal dong (법정동) administered under its administrative dong (행정동), Cheongun-dong.

== History ==
In November 1945, Yeom Dong-jin purchased a house in this neighborhood and used it as the headquarters for the right-wing terrorist group the White Shirts Society. Eventually, the house was acquired by the Korean Central Intelligence Agency. In 1979, that house served as the location of the assassination of Park Chung Hee.

== See also ==
- Administrative divisions of South Korea
