= Hyuk =

- Hangul: 혁
- RR: Hyeok
- MR: Hyŏk
- IPA: [çʌk̚]

Hyuk, also spelled Hyeok, or Hyok, is a Korean given name.

== People ==
- Kim Hyeok (independence activist) (1915–1945), independence activist
- Byun Hyuk (born 1966), South Korean film director and screenwriter
- An Hyuk (born 1968), North Korean defector
- Kim Hyuk (born 1972), South Korean judo practitioner
- Jang Hyuk (born 1976), South Korean actor
- Kwon Hyuk (baseball) (born 1983), South Korean baseball player
- Hyuk Shin (born 1985), South Korean-born American music producer
- Jeong Hyuk (born 1986), South Korean football player
- Dean (South Korean singer) (born Kwon Hyuk, 1992), South Korean singer-songwriter and record producer
- Oh Hyuk (born 1993), South Korean singer, member of rock band Hyukoh
- Jin Hyuk, South Korean television director

People with the stage name or nickname Hyuk include:

- Im Hyuk (born Im Jung-hyuk, 1949), South Korean actor
- Hyuk (singer) (born Han Sang-hyuk, 1995), South Korean singer, member of boy band VIXX

== See also ==
- List of Korean given names
