= Kim Hyeok =

Kim Hyeok may refer to:

- Kim Hyeok (equestrian)
- Kim Hyeok (independence activist)
