= Hyŏn Chunhyŏk =

Korean communist (1906–1945)

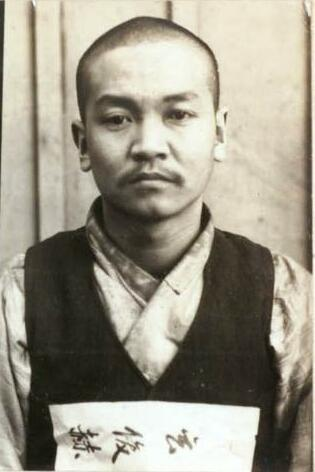
- Hyŏn after his arrest for participating in a farmers' union incident. Taken on 24 April 1935 in a Jongno District police station.

Head of the South Pyongan Provincial Committee of the Communist Party of Korea
- In office 17 August 1945 – 3 September 1945

Personal details
- Born: 13 May 1906
- Died: 3 September 1945 (aged 39) Pyongyang, Soviet Civil Administration
- Resting place: Revolutionary Martyrs' Cemetery
- Education: Keijō Imperial University

Korean name
- Hangul: 현준혁
- Hanja: 玄俊赫
- RR: Hyeon Junhyeok
- MR: Hyŏn Chunhyŏk

Hyŏn Chunhyŏk (Korean: 현준혁; 13 May 1906 – 3 September 1945) was a Korean politician and leader in the Communist Party of Korea. He was assassinated likely by a member of Daedongdan, the predecessor to the terrorist group the White Shirts Society.

== Early life and education ==
Hyŏn was born on 13 May 1906. His hometown was Kaechon, South Pyongan Province, Korean Empire. He had a younger brother, Hyŏn Kwan-hyŏk (Korean: 현관혁).

He graduated from Keijō Imperial University. According to the historian Jung Byung Joon, Hyŏn was known as "one of the two geniuses of Kwanso" (『관서 지역 2대 천재 중 하나』).

== Career ==
=== Local head of the Communist Party of Korea ===
On 15 August 1945, Korea was liberated from Japanese colonial rule. The northern half of Korea was then placed in a trusteeship under the Soviet Union, called the Soviet Civil Administration. However, the Soviets did not arrive in Pyongyang until 26 August. Before then, the city was wracked with hunger, violence, and looting.

According to the records of the Communist Party of Korea (CPK), on 17 August, Hyŏn departed from Seoul to Pyongyang and likely arrived on the 18th. The Pyongyang district branch of the CPK (조선공산당 평남지구당부) was established on the 17th. There are Russian records that state Hyŏn was released from prison on 16 August and had a meeting with the local Japanese governor on 17 August. A Japanese source says that on 15 August the CPK began distributing leaflets that read "Protect Japanese lives" (『일본인의 생명을 보호하라』), but Jung questions the chronology of both these claims.

There were not many communists in Pyongyang at the time of liberation. In fact, the majority of the city was composed of right-leaning Christian nationalists. The communists who were there mostly congregated on the official branch of the CPK after its creation. However, on 20 August a small but violent minority led by Jang Si-woo formed their own party of the same name, except that it was unaffiliated with the CPK and it called itself the Pyongyang city branch (조선공산당 평양시당부). Their ideology rejected cooperation with other political ideologies and called for an immediate communist revolution. They denounced Hyŏn and the other branch as traitors and had several violent clashes with them.

For the several weeks before his death, Hyŏn was the highest-ranking communist in North Korea, and has been discussed in the context of potential Soviet candidates for leadership of North Korea, alongside Kim Il Sung. However, he is often considered by later scholars to have been relatively independent and removed from the Soviet command structure. He had few contacts within the Soviet Union and was not trusted by Moscow. By contrast, Kim Il Sung was an adequate speaker of Russian and had been known to the Soviets from his time as an anti-Japanese guerrilla.

==== Red Guard ====
On 27 August, Hyŏn formed a militant organization within the branch called the Red Guard. The Red Guard was formed in response to violence and instability in the wake of the collapse of the Japanese colonial government. It engaged in several significant clashes with the Japanese and Korean police in Pyongyang, especially because the majority of police at the time were right-wing.

In one incident, they planned to preemptively strike the security forces led by Choe Neung-jin, but Cho Man-sik intervened. He managed to convince them to halt the attack by saying, "Should we really be fighting other Koreans when the Japanese are still watching our every move?" (Note: 『아직 일본인들이 우리가 하는 일들을 지켜보고 있는데 같은 동족끼리 싸워서야 되겠느냐』)

==== Meeting the Soviets ====
The Soviets entered the city on 26 August. On 27 August, Hyŏn met with the commander of the 25th Army, General Ivan Chistyakov. Hyŏn adopted a policy of cooperating with the Soviets, which earned him and his organizations Soviet support. However, this also drew the ire of the right wing, the anti-Soviet left-wing, and the nationalists who opposed the trusteeship of Korea.

Soviet support made the Red Guard a significant player in the Pyongyang security scene, which was highly unstable in the first few months. The Soviets disarmed the Japanese police in Pyongyang on 27 August. The Soviets, the Red Guard, and the various police forces in Pyongyang had numerous conflicts over time.

== Death ==
Hyŏn was assassinated in Pyongyang around noon on 3 September 1945. Hyŏn, Han Geun-jo, and Cho Man-sik had been returning from a meeting at the headquarters of the 25th Army in Pyongyang in a Japanese-made truck. Hyŏn and Han were seated in the back, and Cho was sitting in the front passenger seat. When the truck slowed down to round a curve, a young man wearing a Red Guard uniform entered the truck with a pistol and shot Hyŏn in the chest, possibly twice. (Note: Han was the mayor of Pyongyang at the time, and did not speculate as to the identity or motivation of the attackers, and his testimony went largely ignored.) Cho shouted Hyŏn's name several times in shock. Hyŏn died on the spot. The assassin then disappeared into an alleyway.

=== Aftermath ===
According to a 1992 interview with Yu Gi-seon (유기선; 劉基善), the chief of the East Pyongyang police who initially investigated the murder, just after lunchtime, he learned of Hyŏn's death and rushed over to Cho's house to interview him. Yoo's recalling of the interview is now an important source for understanding Hyŏn's death.

Soviet authorities reportedly showed little interest in investigating the murder, and even discouraged reporting on it. The assassin(s) were never caught and fled to the South. Yeom Dong-jin, the founding leader of Daedongdan and generally agreed to have ordered the assassination, was briefly arrested as a suspect but was soon released. He then fled south along with other members.

Hyŏn was initially buried at the site of the Shintoist Heijō Shrine. Hyŏn was later reburied in the Revolutionary Martyrs' Cemetery, in what is now North Korea. His funeral and funeral procession can be briefly seen in a 1945 South Korean newsreel released a few weeks after his death.

== Historiography of death ==
=== Date ===
For decades, the date of the assassination was uncertain, with various sources naming 2, 3, 4, 18, or 28 September as the date. Hyŏn's tombstone has the date as 3 September. Jung also compiled a list of publications and testimonies that provided dates for the assassination. Most sources used the 2, 3, and 4 September dates. The historian Kim Chang-soon was the first to propose the 28 September death date in 1961. He originally proposed this date to support his theory that Kim Il Sung ordered the murder, as Kim was not present on the peninsula until weeks after 3 September. In a 2018 book, the Western scholar Michael Seth used the 28 September death date.

=== Identity of attackers and motive ===
While the identity and motive behind the killing is not known with certainty, it is the general consensus that the main attacker was Paek Kwan-ok of Daedongdan, which was the predecessor to the White Shirts Society (WSS).

However, until the 1990s, it was widely believed that left-wing forces were behind the attack. Cho's Korean Social Democratic Party and the right-wing in the South believed that Jang's forces were behind it. They believed Jang and other communists targeted Hyŏn because he was too willing to cooperate with the right. In 2021, Jung noted that this was still a possibility, as the perpetrators remained unknown due to their evading arrest.

The historian Kim Chang-soon, a former North Korean communist who defected to South Korea in 1950, proposed in 1958 and 1961 that Kim Il Sung and the Soviets ordered Jang and Kim Yong-bom to orchestrate the attack. This theory was also supported in 1962 by a significant reporter on Kim Il Sung, Han Jae-deok, who provided the drunken testimony of an interpreter for the Soviets as evidence. Jung, knowing Hyŏn's death date as per the tombstone, said that Kim Chang-soon was likely swept up in anti-Kim Il Sung sentiment in the wake of the Korean War.

In 1993, the theory that Daedongdan was behind the murder was first proposed in Lee Yeong-shin's 1994 book Secret Organization White Shirts Society (『비밀결사 백의사』), which was based mostly on extensive interviews of Yeom's acquaintances and family. This led to significant renewed interest in Hyŏn's murder, which had been largely forgotten about until that point.

In a 2002 episode of the documentary series Now I Can Say It, a 21 May 1986 recording was released that they alleged was of Paek confessing to the murder: (Note: 『(나는 소련군)강훈 소좌를 염선생(염동진)과 두 번 만났거든. (강훈)그놈이 동무들은 위대한 소련군을 리해 못한다. 스탈린그라드를 점령한 독일군도 여자(겁탈)하고 재산 약탈하고 그랬다. 그런데 뭘 그러느냐....(현준혁)당신이 공산당 책임자니까니 (소련군에게)이야기 하시오. 그러자 (현준혁이)내가 이야기하지요. 그래서 내일 다시 오겠다 하고 (다음날)또 갔지. 그것 어떻게 됐습니까 하니까 (현준혁이)뭐 어쩌구 해. 그래서 알았어, 이건 없애야 되겠어. 이 새끼를 없어야 하겠어.』 Note that "son of a bitch" (새끼) can be clearly heard in the audio of the television episode, but is not transcribed in both written sources.)

Mr. Yeom [Dong-jin] and I [met with the Red Army] Major Kang Hoon twice. That bastard [Kang] didn't understand anything about his comrades in the 'great Red Army'. The Germans who occupied Stalingrad raped [Soviet women] and plundered. How can [the Soviets] do [the same here]... [So we said to Hyŏn], because you're the head of the communists here, go talk to the Soviets about this. But [Hyŏn said] we should go talk to them. So we told him we'd see him again tomorrow, and we did. [He] asked how it went, and what could we even say? So then [we decided], alright, we need to get rid of this son of a bitch.

— Now I Can Say It, Episode 46: Secret Organization White Shirts Society

They alleged that the recording was of Paek and provided by Paek's older brother, Paek Kŭn-ok (백근옥). As a result of the recording, the consensus became that the assassination was carried out by Daedongdan in retaliation for rape and looting that occurred at the hands of the Soviets. (Note: According to later Soviet documents, in May 1946 the Soviets took materials and machinery from Korea worth approximately 34.6 million yen.)

==== Jung's theory ====
However, in 2021, Jung Byung Joon questioned both the assumed identity of the speaker and the stated motivation. Jung found the original recording and other materials involving the speaker, and claimed that the recording was actually of Paek's older brother.

He also provided his own theory for the motivation: that the murder was mainly motivated by the conflict over the Pyongyang security situation, and not by retaliation against the Soviets. He reasoned this because Paek's older brother was the head of one of the police forces that had conflicts with both the Red Guard and the Soviets, and would be motivated to portray the Red Guard in a negative light by having one of the assassins dressed in their uniform. In addition, he noted that the murder was of a Korean relatively disconnected with the Soviets, and not of a Soviet actually engaging in a crime. Finally, he argued that reports of Soviet atrocities only emerged a few weeks after the confirmed assassination date of 3 September, and were unlikely to be the motivation.

He also notes that the chronology provided in another testimony by the elder Paek is seemingly incorrect; Paek stated that a first meeting with Hyŏn took place on 10 September, and a second meeting and the murder took place on 18 September. He theorizes that Paek either misremembered or misrepresented the event, in an attempt to portray the Soviets negatively.

== Notes and references ==
=== Sources ===
- Jung, Byung Joon (2021), 현준혁 암살과 김일성 암살시도―평남 건준의 좌절된 '해방황금시대'와 백의사 [Assassination of Hyun Junhyuk and Assassination Attempt on Kim Ilsung: 'The Frustrated Golden Days' of Pyongnam Korean Committee for the Preparation of the Re-establishment of the State and the Origin of White Shirts Society], 역사비평 [Critical Review of History] (in Korean), no. 136, pp. 342–388
- Jung, Byung Joon (May 2021), 관동군 밀정 염동진과 독립투사 김혁―낙양군관학교 동기생의 엇갈린 운명과 백의사의 기원 [Lyom Dongjin, Spy of Kwantung Army Kempeitai vs. Kim Hyuk, Independence Fighter: Cross Rancor of Alumni of Luoyang Military Academy and Origins of the White Shirts Society], 역사비평 [Critical Review of History] (in Korean), vol. 135, 역사문제연구소 [The Institute for Korean Historical Studies], pp. 289–331
