= Kim Soo-im =

South Korean interpreter (1911–1950)

- 김수임(金壽任)
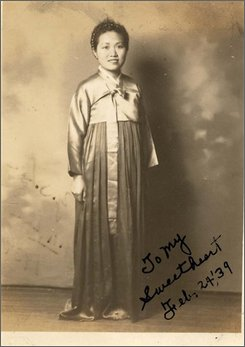
- Kim Soo-im, February 24, 1939
- Born: Kim Soo-im; 1910-1911; Kaesong, Gyeonggi Province, Chōsen, now South Korea
- Died: June 1950 (aged 39–40); Seoul, South Korea
- Education: Ewha Womans University
- Occupation: Interpreter

Korean name
- Hangul: 김수임
- Hanja: 金壽任
- RR: Gim Suim
- MR: Kim Suim

Kim Soo-im (Korean: 김수임; Hanja: 金壽任; 1910-1911 – abt. June 25, 1950) (Note: All but one source reports her birth year as 1911. Jessica Kim, her granddaughter, reports in her journal article that it is 1910. Her death date is always reported as June 1950. Many report it as around the time the Korean War started, which was on June 25, 1950. Some state June 24 and some June 25. Shindonga News reports that the declassified Baird files state it was on June 28.) was an accused communist during the Japanese colonial period and the military government era, and a woman executed in South Korea on charges of being a spy for the Democratic People's Republic of Korea. She worked as an employee of the US Military Government in Korea and an interpreter at the US Embassy in Korea, and was accused of providing various confidential information to Yi Kang-guk and the Workers' Party of South Korea. She was arrested by investigative authorities in April 1950, sentenced to death on June 15, and shot by firing squad right around the start of the Korean War. However, there is controversy over whether she was a spy. She is often called the Korean Mata Hari.

== Life and work ==
Born in Kaesong, Gyeonggi Province, she struggled financially from a young age. Her parents divorced early in her life. Her stepfather resented her, and sold her to a local farmer at age 11. Her biological father found out about this, brought her back, and got her into high school. She completed her studies with the help of foreign missionaries. She excelled in English conversation and interpretation.

After graduating from Ewha Womans University with a degree in English Literature, she met and lived with communist Yi Kang-guk. Using her fluent English, she worked as an interpreter for an American at Severance Hospital in the 1930s. During the US military government in Korea, she worked as an employee for the military government and lived with US Colonel John Baird in Okin-dong. Baird was in charge of the military police in South Korea.

When an arrest warrant was issued for Yi Kang-guk in September 1946, she hid him in the house of an American advisor and helped Lee defect to North Korea in 1947. Yi Kang-guk was promoted to the first Foreign Minister by the Kim Il-sung regime. Later, when Yi Kang-guk launched an operation against South Korea, Kim Soo-im cooperated with his plan through a secret liaison and lent her house as a secret base for the Workers' Party of South Korea. She also allegedly stole various confidential information and provided it to the Workers' Party of South Korea. Meanwhile, she secretly rescued and hid Yi Sung-yop (also Lee Seung-yeop), a guerrilla fighter for the Workers' Party of South Korea who had been imprisoned on death row by the Army Special Forces after his arrest, and helped him defect to North Korea under the guise of a doctor.

In 1947, Yi Kang-guk dispatched a messenger to South Korea. From then on, she hid Yi Kang-guk's messengers in his house several times for about a year, and in December of the same year, she helped transport Bank of Joseon notes to Seoul. After the establishment of the South Korean government, she moved to a position as an interpreter at the U.S. Embassy in Korea. She also lived with an American who was an advisor to an investigative agency in the foreigner's residence, and steadily participated in social circles, rising to the ranks of socialite.

From the spring to the autumn of 1950 an anti-communist/leftist fervor gripped South Korea. The government executed at least 100,000 people, often without trial, in an attempt to keep them from reinforcing and aiding North Korea. Kim Soo-im, a woman in a strongly patriarchal society, became one of this purge's victims. Kim was arrested by the authorities in early April 1950 on charges of engaging in espionage activities under Yi Kang-guk's direction while living with John Baird, having been in a romantic relationship with Yi Kang-guk, an elite communist who had studied in Germany. She was accused of being "very malicious international spy". A search and seizure of her home uncovered three pistols, 180 rounds of ammunition, and numerous classified materials intended for North Korea. Her most serious crime was passing information on the withdrawal of American troops in 1949 to North Korea. She was sentenced to death by the South Korean Army High Court-Martial on June 15 of that year, and is known to have been executed by firing squad around the outbreak of the Korean War. Kim was shot and buried in a field on the outside of Seoul. Later lower income tenements were built on this land, housing some of Seoul's poorest people. She is often called the Korean Mata Hari and "The Korean Seductress Who Betrayed America".

== After death ==
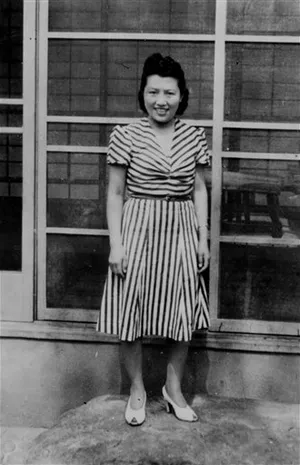
Kim Soo-im, c. 1948

As a close friend of Moh Youn-sook, Moh Youn-sook actively defended Kim Soo-im during her trial. Her tragic love and death with Yi Kang-guk and Baird, was rich in dramatic elements and served as a good material for promoting anti-communism, so her life was featured in many creative works, including the documentary Special Investigation Headquarters: The Life of Kim Soo-im (1974), the play “I, Kim Soo-im” (1997), as well as three TV series and a film. The non-fiction work “Love Shot Her” (2002) was written by Jeon Sook-hee, a junior of Kim Soo-im at Ewha Womans University. Yi Kang-guk was subsequently executed in North Korea on charges of espionage and may have been an American agent.

There have been ongoing claims that the information released at the time was far from the truth, such as the Associated Press raising suspicions of manipulation based on classified materials stored in the U.S. National Archives in 2008 such that Baird did not have access to classified information. The former American military governor of Korea, Lieutenant General John R. Hodge even testified that Baird had no access to classified information. Significant evidence that Kim was tortured from South Korean sources came to light. There have also been questions about the legitimacy of the law under which she was charged. Kim Soo-im's son, Kim Won-il, also claimed that his father, Baird, was not in a position to access classified information at the time.

== Family ==
Kim Soo-im had a son, Kim Won-il, with Baird. He was adopted by a church administrator and his wife. This family moved to America in 1970 where he earned a PhD in Old Testament studies. He lives in Los Angeles and is a pastor and works as a theology professor at La Sierra College, a private Seventh-day Adventist college in Riverside, California. Her son is the person who discovered the formerly classified file on Baird and his mother. Kim Won-il visited Baird in a Rhode Island nursing home, but Baird told him that Kim Won-il's father was "Mr. Smith." Nancy Kim, a friend of Kim Soo-im, says that Kim Won-il looks like Baird.

== Actors who played Kim Soo-im ==
=== TV ===
- Jung Ae-ri - 1981 - 1st Republic - MBC Drama
- Yoon Mi-ra - 1985 - Dawn - KBS Drama
- Han Eun-jung - 2006 - Seoul 1945 - KBS drama

=== Film ===
- Moon Jeong-sook - 1964 - I was deceived

== See also ==
- Communist Party of Korea
- Pak Hon-yong (also Park Heon-yeong)
- Yoshiko Kawashima
