= Song Jin-woo (journalist) =

Korean independence activist (1899–1945)

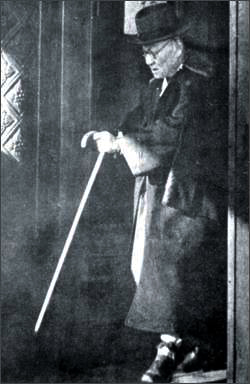

Personal details
- Born: 8 May 1889 Damyang, South Jeolla Province, Joseon
- Died: 30 December 1945 (aged 56) Seoul, South Korea
- Party: Korea Democratic Party
- Awards: Order of Merit for National Foundation, 3rd Grade

Korean name
- Hangul: 송진우
- Hanja: 宋鎭禹
- RR: Song Jinu
- MR: Song Chinu

Art name
- Hangul: 고하
- Hanja: 古下
- RR: Goha
- MR: Koha

Childhood name
- Hangul: 옥윤
- Hanja: 玉潤
- RR: Okyun
- MR: Ogyun

Song Jin-woo (Korean: 송진우, 8 May 1889 – 30 December 1945) was a Korean independence activist, journalist, and politician. His art name was Goha (고하; 古下). He was the 3rd, 6th and 8th CEO of the Dong-a Ilbo and the founding leader of the Korea Democratic Party.

In 1945, he was assassinated by Han Hyeon-woo, a member of the far-right terrorist group the White Shirts Society.

== Early life ==
Song was born on 8 May 1889 in Damyang, South Jeolla Province, Joseon. He was the fourth son of father Song Hun (송훈; 宋壎), and mother (surname Yang 양; 梁). His bon-gwan is the Sinpyeong Song clan.

From age four, he learned Classical Chinese under Ki Sam-yeon. In 1904, fifteen-year-old Song married a woman with the surname Yu (유; 柳) from Jeongeup. Two years after this, Song studied more modern subjects in the educational institution Yeonghaksuk (영학숙; 英學塾). There, he met Kim Seong-su.

In 1907, while studying at Cheongryuam (part of the Baegyangsa temple in South Jeolla Province), he decided to study abroad in Japan. Song left the temple and went to study at the Guemho School (금호학교; 金湖學校) in Gunsan. By October, he and Kim went to Tokyo, where they studied at the Seisoku Gakuen English School and Kinjo Middle School (錦城中學校). By 1910, the both of them managed to enter Waseda University, but returned to Korea after the news broke that Japan had colonized the peninsula.

The following year, he returned to Japan to study law at Meiji University. There, he started an organization for foreign exchange students and founded a student magazine called Hakchigwang. He graduated in 1915.

== Career ==
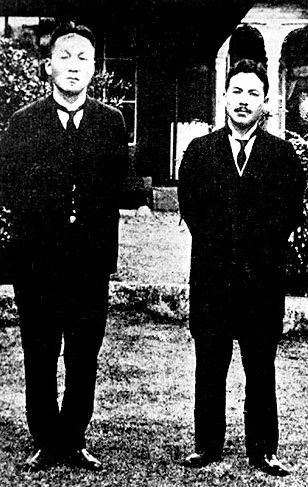
Kim and Song in 1919

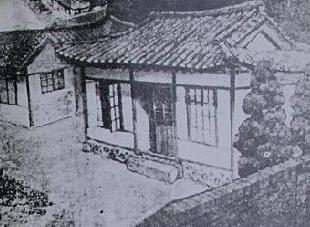
Choongang High School, where Song and others planned resistance activities against the Japanese (November 1918)

In 1916, he became the vice principal of the Choongang School, which Kim had taken over, in Seoul. He later became its principal. In 1918, Song and several others began plotting an uprising against the Japanese colonial government. After the March 1st Movement protests of 1919, Song was arrested and held at Seodaemun Prison. He spent a year and a half in prison, until he was acquitted of all charges and released around October 1920.

In 1921, he became the third chairman of the newspaper The Dong-a Ilbo, following Kim. During his tenure, the paper advocated for Korean nationalist movements such as the Home Product Promotion Campaign and the Private University Establishment Movement. In 1923, he founded an organization for Korean expatriates, and fundraised for it around the country. He resigned his post at Ilbo in April 1924, but joined as an advisor in October. In the following year, he was made its editor-in-chief. In 1925, he attended a conference in Hawaii that was organized by Soh Jaipil, and returned home afterwards.

In March 1926, publication of Ilbo was suspended for a second time after it was caught celebrating an anniversary of the March 1st Movement. Song was initially sentenced to six months in prison, but in November his sentence was extended for another six months. He was eventually released in February 1927 due to a clemency order issued in celebration of the beginning of Emperor Hirohito's reign. In October, he became the Ilbo's sixth chairman, again following Kim.

In 1928, Soh held the third iteration of his conference in Kyoto, and Song attended it. In 1930, after the tenth anniversary edition of the Ilbo, the paper's publication was suspended for a third time, but it resumed in September. During his tenure in 1931, the paper advocated for the restoration of Hyeonchungsa Shrine and ran the V Narod Movement, which promoted rural literacy in order to promote popular resistance sentiment. In the aftermath of the Wanpaoshan Incident, in which conflict broke out between Korean and Chinese farmers in Manchuria, Song published an editorial that chastised the Japanese colonial government's response to the incident and called for peace. For this, Chinese Generalissimo Chiang Kai-shek sent Song an award.

In August 1936, the Ilbo was discontinued for a fourth time, after it was revealed that it had doctored a photo to remove the Japanese flag from the chest of Sohn Kee-chung, a competitor in the Berlin Olympics. While it was allowed to resume publication on June of the following year, the Governor-General of Chōsen forced its discontinuation again in December 1939. In 1940, Song went over to Japan to protest its closure, but he was arrested while returning to the peninsula. The Ilbo stayed closed for the time being.

After his release, Song isolated himself in his home. He excused his reclusiveness by claiming he had an illness. After the beginning of the Pacific War, on 8 December 1941, the Governor-General began conscripting Korean students to fight in the war. Frustrated by his inability to speak out against this, Song privately wrote that "The Dong-a Ilbo is my mouth, my ears, my breathing nose, my hands, and my feet. How can a man with all of those parts sliced off do anything!" (Note: "『동아일보』는 내 입이요 내 귀며 호흡하는 코요 손과 발인데, 그 전부를 잘려버린 사람이 어떻게 행동할 수 있는가!")

=== After the liberation of Korea ===
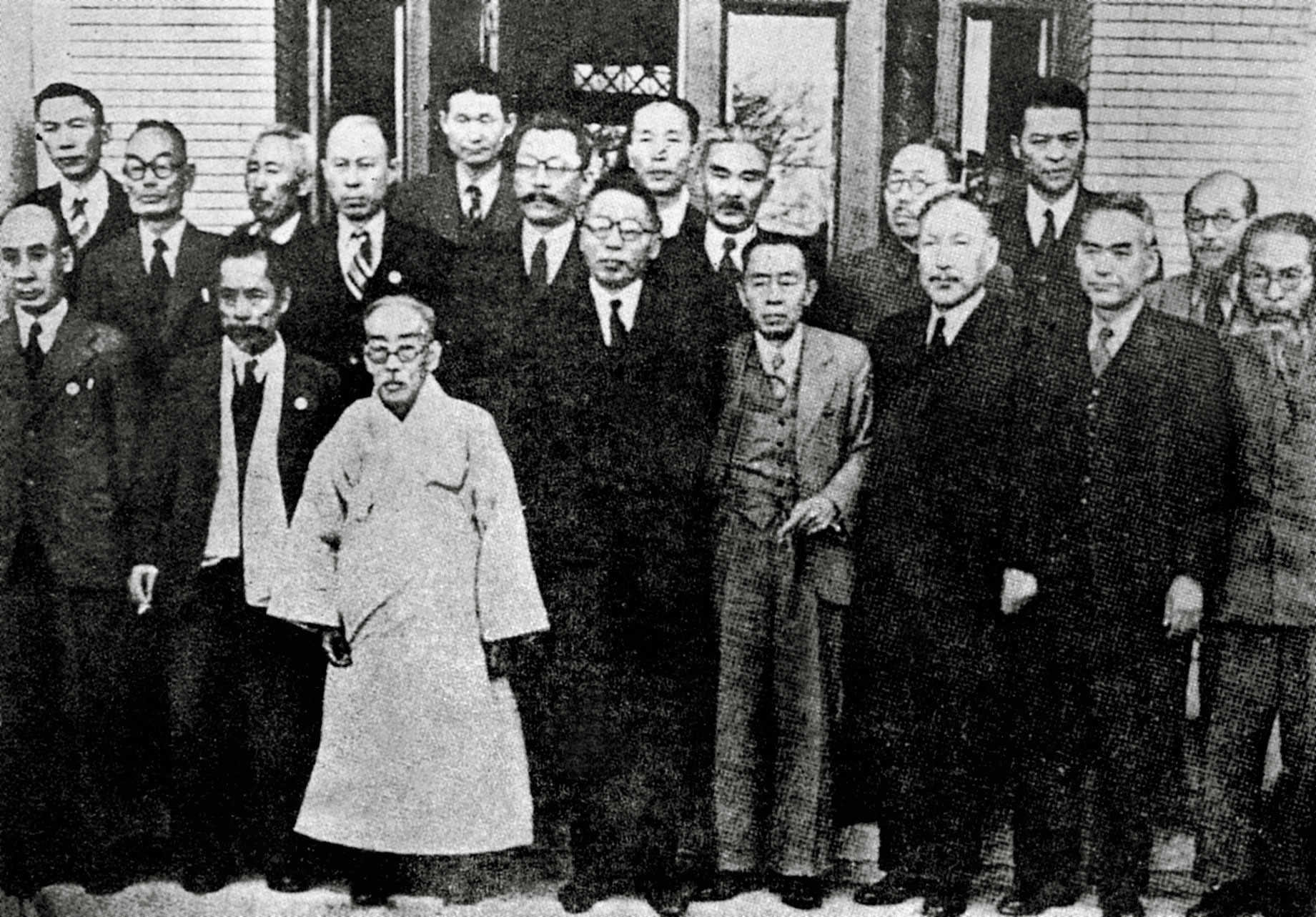
December 3, 1945. A photograph commemorating the return of the Provisional Government leaders with Song Jin-woo included

After the liberation of Korea, the office of the Governor-General began planning its departure and hand off of control to Korean institutions. The security office had three Korean candidates that they felt who could handle their work: Song, Lyuh Woon-hyung, and Ahn Chai-hong. In mid-August, (Note: Chronology is unclear, according to Son.) the head of security reached out to Song and offered him the position, which came with control over newspapers, broadcasting, transportation, and security. Song refused it. Associates of Song, such as Lee In, questioned the wisdom of the decision. According to historian Son Sae-il, Song viewed the position as being akin to the role of Wang Jingwei in the Japanese puppet state. The position was then offered to Lyuh, who accepted it.

Lyuh founded the Committee for the Preparation of Korean Independence (CPKI). Lyuh asked Song on a number of occasions to join, but Song refused. On one occasion, their disagreements escalated into a shouting match. To counter the CPKI, Song became the founding leader of the National Foundation Preparation Committee (NFPC) on 7 September and the Korea Democratic Party on 16 September.

In December of that year, the Moscow Conference was held. Afterwards, the United States and Soviet Union announced that they had failed to negotiate the reunification of Korea and that the peninsula would be occupied for 5 years. This roused up the Anti-trusteeship Movement. On the evening of 29 December, Song and members of the Korean Provisional Government held a furious meeting on the results of the conference.

== Death ==
Around 6:00 a.m. on 30 December 1945, Song was assassinated by a group of seven men. Among them was Han Hyeon-wu, a member of the right-wing terrorist group the White Shirts Society.

== Legacy and awards ==
On 1 March 1963, he was posthumously awarded the Order of Merit for National Foundation, third grade.

=== Popular culture ===
- Portrayed by actor Park Geun-hyung in the 1981–82 TV series, 1st Republic.

== See also ==
- Kim Seong-su
- Kim Ku
- Yun Posun
- Sin Ik-hui
- Chang Deok-soo
