= 1st Republic (TV series) =

1981–1982 South Korean television series

- The show's titlecard
- Also known as: The First Republic
- Hangul: 제1공화국
- Hanja: 第1共和國
- RR: Je1 gonghwaguk
- MR: Che1 konghwaguk
- Genre: Period drama; Docudrama; Biopic
- Screenplay by: Kim Gi-pal
- Opening theme: Fanfare for the Common Man
- Country of origin: South Korea
- Original language: Korean
- No. of seasons: 1
- No. of episodes: 39

Production
- Producers: Go Seok-man, Lee Yeon-hun

Original release
- Network: MBC TV
- Release: 2 April 1981 – 11 February 1982

1st Republic (Korean: 제1공화국; RR: Je1 gonghwaguk) is a South Korean historical television series that was originally broadcast on MBC TV from 2 April 1981 to 11 February 1982. According to some sources, (Note: Most sources with this claim originally source their information from the producer Go.) it is considered the first political drama television series in South Korean history, and the first to depict a recent president during an era of heavy media censorship. It covers the First Republic of Korea: the government of South Korea between 1948 and 1960. The series consisted of 39 episodes, each around an hour long, and led to multiple sequel series over the next few decades that covered each of the Five Republics of Korea, including the 2005 5th Republic TV series.

== Premise ==
The show covers events from 1945 to 1960, including the 1945 liberation of Korea from the Japanese Empire, the 1950 Korean War, and the 1960 establishment of the Second Republic of Korea.

== Cast ==
- Choi Bool-am as Syngman Rhee
- Lee Young-hoo as Kim Ku
- Park Gyu-chae as Lee Ki-poong
- Kook Jong-hwan as Kim Il Sung
- Shim Yang-hong as Yu Chin-san
- Lee Jung-gil as Chang Taek-sang
- Kim Mu-saeng as Chough Pyung-ok
- Park Jong-gwan as Cho Man-shik
- Kim Yong-gun as Yun Chi-young
- Choi Myeong-soo as Kim Chun-yon
- Kim Gil-ho as Lyuh Woon-hyung
- Park Geun-hyung as Song Jin-woo
- Park Yeong-ji as Kim Tu-bong
- Lee Mug-won as Kim Kyu-sik
- Han In-su as Chang Deok-soo
- Im Hyun-sik as Choe Hyon
- Kang In-deok as Kim Du-han
- Park Woong as Kwak Sang-hoon
- Kim Ae-gyeong as Maria Kim
- Jung Ae-ri as Kim Soo-im
- Bak Il as Park In-soo
- Jo Kyung-hwan as Lee Jeong-jae
- O Yeong-su as Military Prosecutor

== Production ==
The series was created just after Chun Doo-hwan seized power at the beginning of the Fifth Republic of Korea, shortly after Park Chung Hee was assassinated in 1979. During both the Chun and Park eras, media censorship was common, making dramas depicting political topics extremely sensitive.

The president of MBC at the time, Lee Jin-hui, closely monitored the creation of the show, to ensure it did not draw the ire of the government.

Go later served as the head of the Korea Creative Content Agency in the South Korean Government from 2007 to 2009.

== Episodes ==
1981
Episode	Broadcast Date	Title (English)	Title (Korean)
1	2 April 1981	Syngman Rhee and Kim Ku	이승만과 김구
2	9 April 1981	Assassination, Assassination, Assassination	암살, 암살, 암살
3	16 April 1981	Cho Man-shik and Kim Il Sung	조만식과 김일성
4	23 April 1981	Terror	테러
5	30 April 1981	Syngman Rhee in 1946	이승만 1946년
6	7 May 1981	The Namro Party	남로당
7	14 May 1981	The Three Leaders of Summer 1947	1947년 여름 삼영수
8	21 May 1981	United Nations Commission on Korea	유엔 한국 임시 위원단
9	28 May 1981	Kim Ku and North-South Talks (Part 1)	김구와 남북협상 (上)
10	4 June 1981	Kim Ku and North-South Talks (Part 2)	김구와 남북협상 (下)
11	11 June 1981	The First President Syngman Rhee	초대 대통령 이승만
12	18 June 1981	Female Spy Kim Soo-im	여간첩 김수임
13	25 June 1981	Miscalculation	오판
14	2 July 1981	Jogakdang at Ihwajang House	이화장의 조각당
15	9 July 1981	The National Assembly's Fraktsiya Scandal	국회 프락치 사건
16	16 July 1981	The Banmintukui Affair (Part 1)	반민특위 사건 (上)
17	30 July 1981	The Banmintukui Affair (Part 2)	반민특위 사건 (下)
18	6 August 1981	The President's People	대통령의 사람들
19	27 August 1981	Ah, Baekbeom (Part 1)	아, 백범 (上)
20	3 September 1981	Ah, Baekbeom (Part 2)	아, 백범 (下)
21	10 September 1981	The May 30th Election	5·30 선거
22	17 September 1981	90 Days Under the Enemy	적치하 90일
23	24 September 1981	Gyeongmudae During Wartime	전시하의 경무대
24	1 October 1981	The Pusan Political Crisis	부산 정치파동
25	8 October 1981	Woonam's Restart	우남의 재출발
26	15 October 1981	The Peace Line	평화선
27	28 October 1981	Merchants During Wartime	전시하의 상인들
28	5 November 1981	The Release of Anti-Communist Captives and Truce	반공포로 석방과 휴전
29	12 November 1981	The KNYA's Elimination and Lee Ki-poong	족청계 거세와 이기붕
30	19 November 1981	The Park In-soo Affair	박인수 사건
31	26 November 1981	The Liberal Party's Landslide Victory (Part 1)	자유당 압승 (上)
32	10 December 1981	The Liberal Party's Landslide Victory (Part 2)	자유당 압승 (下)
33	17 December 1981	Lee Ki-poong and the Liberal	이기붕과 자유당
1982
34	7 January 1982	Kim Il Sung and the Purge	김일성과 숙청극
35	14 January 1982	The Hangul Simplifiation Movement	한글파동
36	21 January 1982	Kim Du-han and Lee Jeong-jae	김두한과 이정재
37	28 January 1982	Adoptee Lee Gang-seok	양자 이강석
38	4 February 1982	The Artists Corps and Lim Hwa-su	예술인단과 임화수
39	11 February 1982	The Democratic Party's Dispute with New and Old Parties and the End of the First Republic	민주당 신구파 분쟁과 제1공화국의 종식
