= Sunrin Internet High School =

- 선린인터넷고등학교
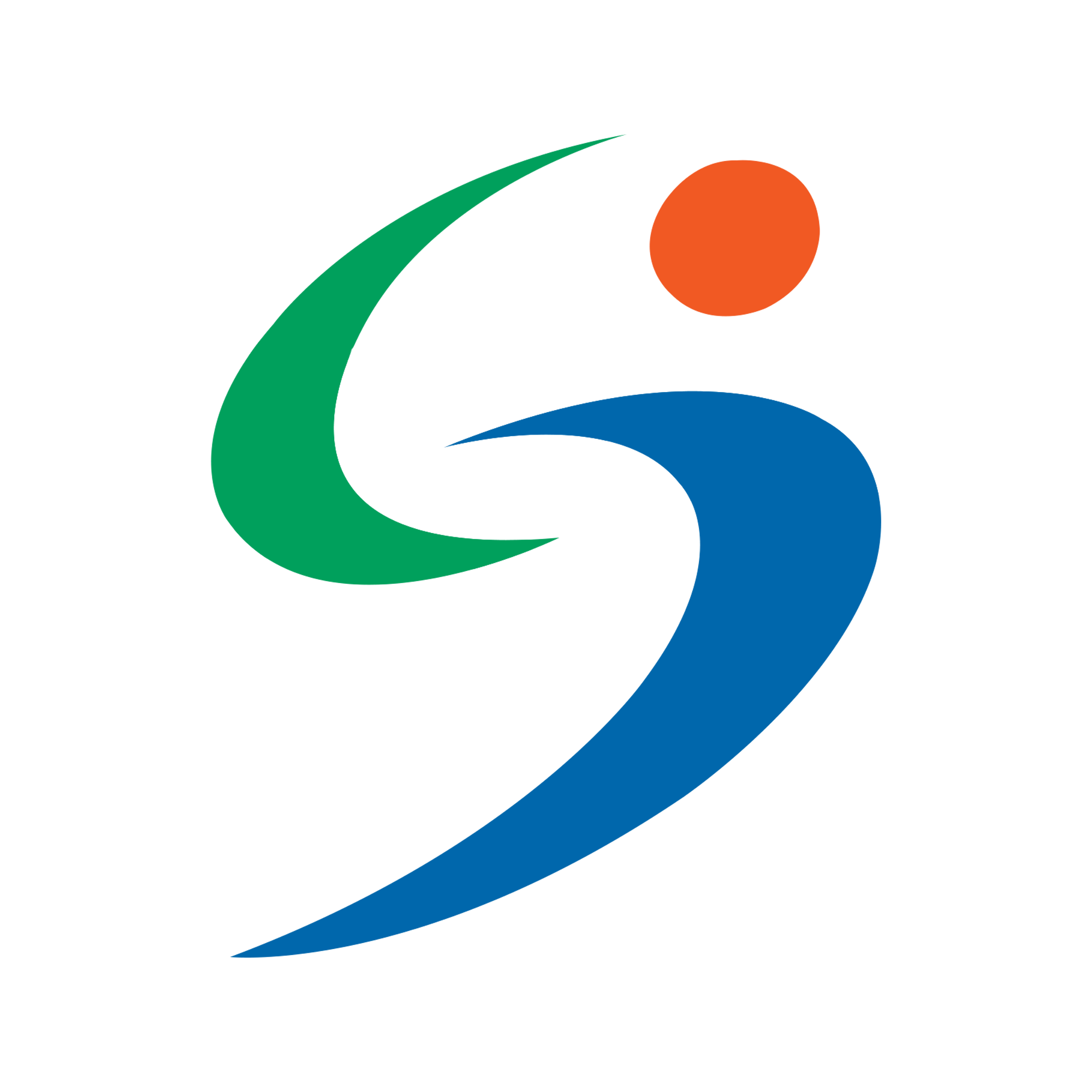

Location
- Seoul; South Korea; 37°32′33″N 126°57′59″E

Information
- Type: Public High School
- Motto: 세계로 미래로 꿈을 펼치자
- Established: 1899
- Founder: Ōkura Kihachirō
- President: Kwon Byeong-Ok
- Website: sunrint.sen.hs.kr

Sunrin Internet High School is an information technology-oriented vocational school in Seoul, South Korea.

== History ==
- 1899: The school was founded by Ōkura Kihachirō and built in cooperation with the Korean government in Myeong-dong, Seoul. Courses are offered for the agricultural, commercial, and industrial sectors.
- 1906: The commercial sector is spun off into a separate school called "Sunrin Commercial School".
- 1908: The first graduation was held.
- 1913: The school moved to Yongsan-gu, Seoul.

== Departments ==
- Information protection
- Software
- IT management
- Content design

== Notable alumni ==
- Yeom Dong-jin (graduated 1931)

== Awards ==
- 2009: POSCO TJ Park Prize, POSCO TJ Park Foundation

== Sources ==
- Sunrin Internet High School
- Tech Savvy Youth – Korea’s Efforts to Create a New Wired Generation
