= Yeom Dong-jin =

Korean right-wing militant (1902–c.1950)

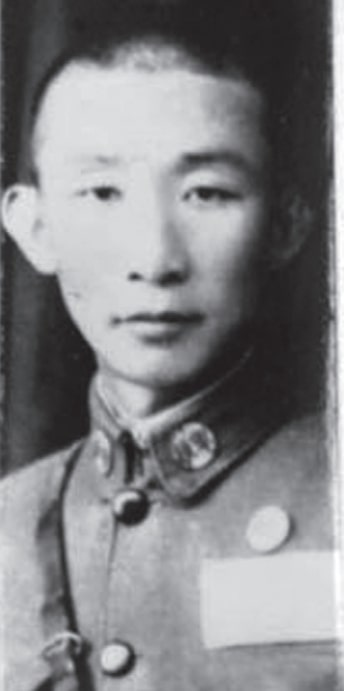
- Yeom upon his 1935 graduation from the Luoyang Military Academy
- Born: Yeom Eung-taek; February 14, 1909; Pyongyang, South Pyongan, Korean Empire
- Died: After June 24, 1950 (around 41); Likely Seoul, South Korea
- Alma mater: Sun Yat-sen University (dropped out); Republic of China Military Academy (dropped out)
- Relatives: Kim Jong-jin (nephew via sister)
- Military career
- Allegiance: Korean Provisional Government; Republic of China (1912–1949)
- Nickname: The Blind General
- Known for: Leader of the White Shirts Society; Assassinations of Korean politicians

Korean name
- Hangul: 염응택
- Hanja: 廉應澤
- RR: Yeom Eungtaek
- MR: Yŏm Ŭngt'aek

Pseudonym
- Hangul: 염동진
- Hanja: 廉東振
- RR: Yeom Dongjin
- MR: Yŏm Tongjin

Yeom Dong-jin (Korean: 염동진; February 14, 1909 – after June 24, 1950 (Note: Likely died some time during the Korean War)), also known as Yeom Eung-taek, was a Korean far-right militant and independence activist. He was the main founder and leader of the White Shirts Society, a secret fascist terrorist organization that assassinated several Korean politicians.

Most scholars believe he was also a double-agent for the Japanese Kempeitai. He and the White Shirts Society have been linked to a number of crimes and assassination attempts. This includes an attempt on Kim Il Sung in 1946, the assassination of Lyuh Woon-hyung in 1947, and the assassination of Kim Ku in 1949. However, there are varying degrees of debate on whether he was truly responsible for these actions.

== Historiography ==
Much of Yeom's life remains unknown or uncertain. Even Yeom's name and birth year have been the subject of uncertainty. Most details about his life come from a number of interviews of people who were either directly or indirectly associated with Yeom. Some information comes from declassified government records. Some accounts directly contradict others, which contributes to ongoing scholarly debate about the reliability of each source.

Some of the earliest and most extensive studies of Yeom and the White Shirts Society are by Lee Yeong-shin (이영신). Most notably, between 1993 and 1995, Lee published a two-volume series entitled Secret Organization White Shirts Society, (Note: 『비밀결사 백의사』. Ahn noted in 2005 that the books are difficult to find copies of, as their original publisher went out of business.) in which he made a number of proposals about Yeom that have persisted as consensus, although some have since been supplanted. Ahn Gi-seok also constructed his own biography of Yeom in 2005. Jung Byung Joon has found a number of critical contemporary records on Yeom and published notable works on him over a period of several decades. (Note: In 1995, Jung found the first known photo of Yeom from a June 3, 1936, Japanese government alert. The photo was taken in 1935, upon Yeom's graduation from the Luoyang Military Academy. In 2021, Jung found the second known photo of Yeom on an academic record from 1933.)

=== Cilley report ===
In 2001, a document written by the US Counterintelligence Corps agent George E. Cilley was declassified and released by the US National Archives and Records Administration. (Note: RG 319, Entry 85A, Army Intelligence Document File, 1944–45 (ID File) no. 573339, Kim Koo: Background Information Concerning Assassination". The current events magazine Shin Dong-a has a Korean translation of the document online.) Among Korean scholars, Jung Byung Joon was the first to discover and write about the document. The document was written on June 29, 1949, just after Kim Ku's assassination on the same day, and submitted several days later on July 1. It consisted of four pages with a confidential classification level that discussed Yeom, the White Shirts Society, Kim's assassin, and Kim's relationship to the preceding topics.

The document is one of the few contemporary records on Yeom and his activities, and contained several allegations that shocked scholars and the general public upon its publication. It led to a renewed interest in Yeom and the White Shirts Society. In fact, despite numerous studies on the CIC's activities in Korea published in the preceding decades, Cilley had been virtually unknown to scholars until that point.

The report is considered to be mostly reliable by South Korean scholars, although there is disagreement on how to interpret its information. It remains an important source of study on Yeom.

== Early life ==
Yeom was born Yeom Eung-taek on February 14, 1909, (Note: The first written confirmation of Yeom's birthname was found by Lee, and published in his 1993 book on the WSS. Lee initially reported that Yeom's birth year was 1902, based on a Japanese police interrogation report (〈경고비밀 제3210호-김구일당의 애국단원 검거에 관한 건〉). However, official documents from the Japanese colonial government in Korea confirm his 1909 birth year.) at 82 Ch'ohyŏn-ri, (Note: 초현리; 草峴里) Chunghwa County, Pyongyang, South Pyongan Province, Korean Empire. He was the third son of father Yeom Do-yeol (염도열; 廉道悅). Yeom also had an older sister. He was of the Paju Yeom clan.

Yeom graduated from the Chunghwa-gongnip Primary School (중화공립보통학교; 中和公立普通學校). He then enrolled in a regular course at the Sunrin Commercial School in Seoul on April 1, 1926, and graduated at age 22 in March 1931. Afterwards, he spent some time at the Munsan area of Paju. (Note: Jung derived this information from an October 12, 1935, Japanese government document entitled Special Alert No. 3210 on identification of wanted Koreans who graduated from the Luoyang Military Academy (「경고특비 제3210호(1935.10.12.) 낙양군관학교 졸업 조선인의 신원 및 수배에 관한 건」).)

== Exile in China ==
Yeom then left Korea to join the Korean Provisional Government (KPG) in exile in Shanghai. There, the KPG had been conducting various resistance activities against Japanese imperialism, especially via their militant arm the Korean Patriotic Organization (KPO). While in Shanghai, Yeom became aligned with Chi Ch'ŏngch'ŏn, a graduate of the Imperial Japanese Army Academy who defected to the KPG in 1919.

After the KPO prominently assassinated Japanese military and colonial personnel in April 1932, the Japanese launched a vigorous effort to capture them. The KPG mostly fled from Shanghai and their activities were significantly disrupted for several years. However, this incident also caused the KPG to gain the respect of Chiang Kai-shek and the Kuomintang (KMT), who began sheltering them and providing resources and training in guerrilla warfare.

=== Student at Sun Yat-sen University ===
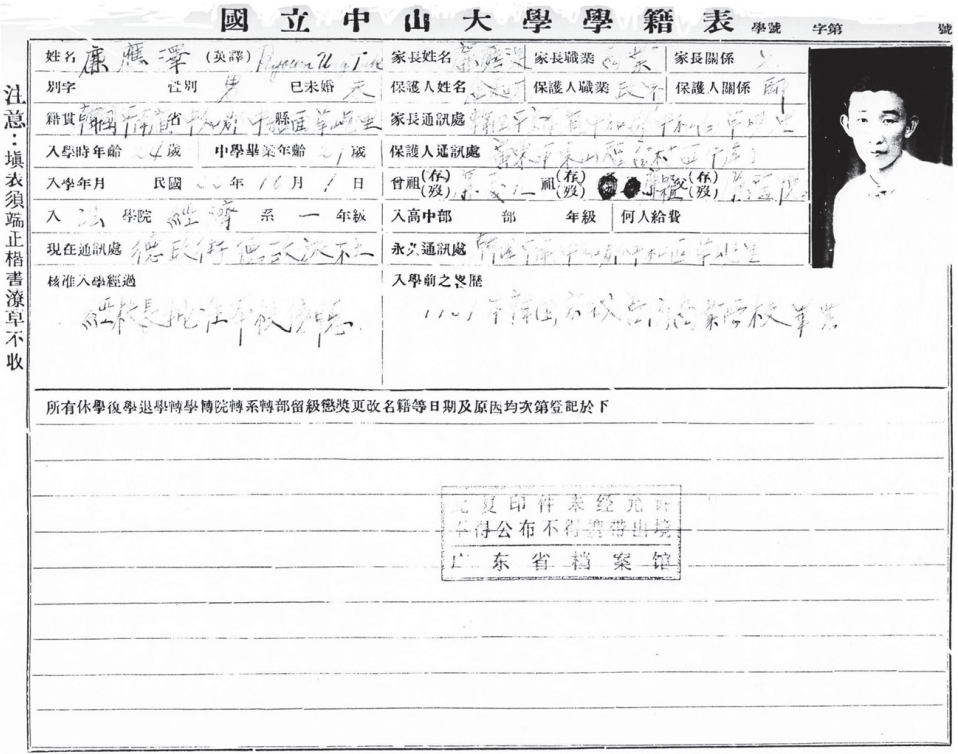
Yeom's 1933 academic record from Sun Yat-sen University.

Beginning in October 1933, Yeom briefly attended Sun Yat-sen University as a first-year student in the Department of Economics of the School of Law. (Note: There, Yeom registered his Chinese name as the hanja of his birth name (Chinese: 廉應澤; pinyin: Lián Yīngzé). An English spelling of his name is also written on the card, although much of the writing is faded. The card also confirms that he had graduated from Sunrin in 1931. It lists the head of his household (가장; 家長) as Yeom Eung-seop (염응섭; 廉應燮) and the head's wife as Yeom Do-yeol (염도열). The person who wrote the recommendation for Yeom to enter the school was Ik Kyun Ku, an ethnic Korean assistant professor there. Ku was an independence activist that helped secure the entry of a number of Koreans into the university and into the Republic of China Military Academy.) His academic record at the university was discovered by Jung in 2021.

=== Luoyang Military Academy ===
In February 1934, Yeom attended a joint KPG–KMT training course at Luoyang. (Note: Often called Luoyang Military Academy (낙양군관학교; 洛陽軍官學校). The official name for the class was the 17th Army Officer Training Class of the 4th Battalion of the 2nd Corps of the Luoyang Branch of the China Central Army Military Academy (중국 중앙육군군관학교 낙양분교제2총대 제4대대 육군군관훈련반제17대). Cilley erroneously claims that the academy was in Chongqing and not Luoyang.) (Note: This is confirmed in both photo and document evidence. Namely, a Japanese notice entitled "Special Notice No. 3210 (12 December 1935) Information on Koreans who graduated from the Luoyang Military Academy". (Korean: 경고특비 제3210호 낙양군관학교 졸업 조선인의 신원 및 수배에 관한 건; Japanese: 京高特秘 洛陽軍官學校卒業鮮人ノ身元竝手配ニ關スル件)) According to Ahn in 2005, the selection process for students was rigorous. Students could be approved for entry by either Kim Ku, Kim Won-bong, or Chi Ch'ŏngch'ŏn. Yeom received a letter of recommendation from Sin Ik-hui and was approved for membership by Ji, making him the first student to enroll in the course. However, Jung claimed in 2021 that it was Park Chan-ik who recommended Yeom and Kim Ku who approved Yeom's entry. Jung also claimed that Yeom even joined the KPO. However, he maintained that Yeom was ideologically more aligned with Ji than with Kim.

Ji and Kim clashed over authority and funding for the class. After Kim transferred 25 students of his faction from the academy to another in Nanjing, the remaining 19 students of Kim's faction complained. Nine students switched to Ji's side and began agitating against Kim, including Yeom, Kim Hyeok, and Park Jin-yang (박진양; 朴震陽). On January 1, 1935, Yeom and the others decided to join the Ji-aligned New Korea Independence Party (신한독립당; 新韓獨立黨). The party then had around 30 members.

The course ended on April 9, 1935, and Yeom was among the 62 students who graduated.

=== Nanjing ===
According to the testimony of Jeon Bong-nam (전봉남; 全奉南), after graduation, the personnel of the Party moved to Nanjing and began renting a house together. In June 1935, they created a militant arm of the organization, of which Yeom served as the Minister of Foreign Affairs (외교부 부장). The leaders of the militant arm rented a room together in Gao Gang County (Chinese: 高崗里), in which they both lived and worked. They all aspired to either continue on to university or receive additional combat training. To improve their odds of being accepted, they began teaching each other various subjects, especially the Chinese and Japanese languages. Yeom taught arithmetic and geometry, and himself aspired to enter Nanjing University (then "National Central University").

However, a month later in July, the Party merged with Kim Won-bong's Korean National Revolutionary Party (KNRP). Shortly afterwards, the militant arm was absorbed into the KNRP's own militant arm. Yeom and the other militants were disappointed, as they were right-leaning and highly skeptical of the left-leaning Kim Won-bong and KNRP.

From August, Yeom and the other militants began receiving training at a secret course for Korean independence activists at the Republic of China Military Academy. However, their dissatisfaction with their new left-leaning comrades grew rapidly. According to the later testimony of one of the officers: (Note: 『특히 기개가 있는 박진양, 염응택, 김유신(金有信), 김혁 등은 불만을 참지 못하고 번민』)

Park Jin-yang, Yeom Eung-taek, Kim Yu-shin, and Kim Hyeok were all stubborn. They couldn't stand their dissatisfaction and suffered.

In mid-October, Yeom and Park escaped the secret training camp and went to the house of Park's brother in Beijing. (Note: However, a Japanese intelligence report dated to December 10, 1935, contradicts this, and states that Yeom was in Nanjing around that December.) Kim Hyeok escaped in January 1936, and returned to his hometown of Pyongyang, where he worked at a bookstore. Kim and Yeom would not reunite until around the time of Kim's death in November 1945.

=== Blue Shirts Society ===
According to later testimonies, while in Nanjing, Yeom met with Sin, adopted a Chinese-style pseudonym, (Note: Korean: 요춘택, cannot find Hanja or Chinese characters) and began working at the post office of the Military Police Headquarters of the National Revolutionary Army in Nanjing.

All sources agree that around this time, Yeom became associated with the Blue Shirts Society (BSS), a secret militant fascist group within the KMT. Around this time, he began going by the name Yeom Dong-jin.

According to the later testimonies of former White Shirts Society agents, (Note: Testimonies from Baek Gwan-ok (백관옥), Baek Geun-ok (백근옥), Choe Ui-ho (최의호), Jo Jae-guk (조재국), and Seon-woo Gil-yeong (선우길영), among others.) after the 1937 outbreak of the Second Sino-Japanese War, Yeom and many other members of the BSS joined the statistical survey department of the National Revolutionary Army (Chinese: 國民政府軍事委員會調查統計局, aka. "Jungtong"). The group performed espionage, assassination and information-gathering activities for the KMT.

== Spy for the Japanese ==
=== Capture and torture ===
Many sources agree that Yeom, while working on intelligence gathering tasks for the KMT in Manchuria, was captured and tortured around 1936 or 1937. However, there are two conflicting accounts of who captured him.

The leading theory and general consensus is that Yeom was arrested in March 1936 in Shancheng, Jilin by the Kempeitai of the Japanese Kwantung Army. He was then tortured, which caused his eyesight to deteriorate. Under duress from the torture, Yeom then agreed to become a spy on behalf of the Japanese.

The other theory comes from Yeom, via the Cilley report. Yeom told Cilley that, due to Kim Ku's betrayal, he had been captured, tortured, and blinded by the Chinese Communist Party. However, this theory is widely rejected by South Korean academics. Jung described it as "slander" and a lie to conceal his past as a double-agent for the Japanese, who were the recent enemy of both the United States and Korea.

=== Spy activities ===
According to Jung, Yeom most likely spied for Japan for around eight years: between March 1936 and March 1944. Until 1940, he worked in Tonghua County for a cultural organization that Jung speculated was a cover company for the espionage operations of the Kempeitai. (Note: Jung verified Yeom's employment there by finding a piece in the Japanese government-run Korea Daily News (now the Seoul Shinmun) sent by Yeom on behalf of the organization. The piece celebrated the establishment of a militant pro-Japanese organization of Koreans.)

Yeom's operations most likely did not directly oppose Korean independence activists. According to Yeom's family, a Japanese officer named Major Kurosaki (黒崎) utilized Yeom's fluency in Chinese and had Yeom work on anti-communist operations. Jung supported this theory, as there was precedent of other Korean anti-communists collaborating with the Japanese out of convenience. However, Jung noted it was still likely that Yeom divulged potentially dangerous information about other independence activists.

A contemporary Chinese source says the following of Yeom's spying: (Note: 『1940년 6월부터 1944년 3월까지 우리 동북지하당과 항일연군의 조직 정황 및 교통 연락망, 식량·탄약의 출처 등정황 및 통화지구 중국인·조선인의 시국에 대한 평판을 비밀리에 계속 정찰하였다. [...] 특무 비로 34차에 걸쳐 총 2,481원(元)을 수령했다.』)

From June 1940 to March 1944, [Yeom] gathered information on the operations, movement, communication, supplies of food and ammunition, and status of the Chinese and Koreans of the underground organizations and anti-Japanese groups in the [Chinese] Northeast. [...] Over 34 operations, he received 2,481 yen.

His salary would have been around 73 yen per month. Jung noted that this was a sizable salary, and comparable to what the colonial governor of a county would receive at the time.

Lee claimed that Yeom's spying even continued past the liberation of Korea in 1945, as he reportedly met with Japanese Sergeant Arakawa Takezo (荒川武藏) in mid-1946.

=== Historiography ===
The theory that Yeom was a double-agent was originally proposed in Lee Yeong-shin's 1993 book. Lee originally did not specify which sources he used to construct the theory. However, Jung was able to find multiple intelligence documents (two Japanese sources, one Chinese source, and a Korean source), as well as testimonies from 9 graduates of the Luoyang military academy that supported it. In light of the combined evidence, he deemed the theory highly likely to be true. In addition, a number of independent accounts from people who knew Yeom, including Yeom's nephew and sister, affirmed this.

== Return to Korea ==
Yeom eventually returned to Pyongyang, but it is unknown specifically when, with years ranging from 1940 to 1944. (Note: Jung claimed that a common year given for Yeom's return was 1940. Bae claimed 1943 in 2016.) According to Jung, Yeom returned to Pyongyang in April 1944 to seek treatment for his deteriorating eyesight. While there, he got married.

=== Daedongdan ===
Yeom founded and led the anti-communist group Daedongdan in August 1944, (Note: 대동단; 大同團. Lebedev gives the founding year as 1943, but the majority of Korean-language sources give a 1944 starting date.) which was the direct predecessor to the 1945 White Shirts Society. The group was first conceptualized at the Buddhist temple Yongmyongsa, (Note: Yongmyongsa was later destroyed during the Korean War.) which Yeom and other left and right-wing nationalists attended.

Yeom is widely suspected to have ordered the September 3, 1945, murder of Hyŏn Chun-hyŏk, the leader of a branch of the Communist Party of Korea. This is due to an audio recording from May 21, 1986, that was published in 2002 that mentioned Yeom in connection with the murder: (Note: 『(나는 소련군)강훈 소좌를 염선생(염동진)과 두 번 만났거든. (강훈)그놈이 동무들은 위대한 소련군을 리해 못한다. 스탈린그라드를 점령한 독일군도 여자(겁탈)하고 재산 약탈하고 그랬다. 그런데 뭘 그러느냐....(현준혁)당신이 공산당 책임자니까니 (소련군에게)이야기 하시오. 그러자 (현준혁이)내가 이야기하지요. 그래서 내일 다시 오겠다 하고 (다음날)또 갔지. 그것 어떻게 됐습니까 하니까 (현준혁이)뭐 어쩌구 해. 그래서 알았어, 이건 없애야 되겠어. 이 새끼를 없어야 하겠어.』 Note that "son of a bitch" (새끼) can be clearly heard in the audio of the television episode, but is not transcribed in both written sources.)

Mr. Yeom [Dong-jin] and I [met with the Red Army] Major Kang Hoon twice. That bastard [Kang] didn't understand anything about his comrades in the 'great Red Army'. The Germans who occupied Stalingrad raped [Soviet women] and plundered. How can [the Soviets] do [the same here]... [So we said to Hyŏn Chun-hyok], because you're the head of the communists here, go talk to the Soviets about this. But [Hyŏn said] we should go talk to them. So we told him we'd see him again tomorrow, and we did. [He] asked how it went, and what could we even say? So then [we decided], alright, we need to get rid of this son of a bitch.

— Now I Can Say It, Episode 46: Secret Organization White Shirts Society

Yeom was arrested in suspicion of being linked to the murder. He was eventually released after his wife pleaded with Soviet General Andrei Romanenko for leniency.

According to interviews with Yeom's family, Yeom then went into hiding at his sister's house in Chaeryong County. Afterwards, around November 1945, Yeom defected to the South upon the recommendation of Daedongdan co-leader Park Go-bong. Park remained in the North. After arriving, Yeom stayed with his in-laws, including Lee Bong-ryeol (이봉렬), who was an employee of the Namseon Electric Company. (Note: 남선전기주식회사, English name spelling from the following source.)

=== Assassination of Kim Hyeok ===
After the liberation of Korea, there is evidence that Kim Hyeok joined a secret police task force in Gyeonggi Province that planned to assassinate 10 Japanese police officers.

Around 5 pm on November 24, 1945, Kim Hyeok was murdered in Seoul. The incident was largely reported on as a simple hit-and-run robbery, and was largely forgotten about until Jung rediscovered Yeom's link to it in 2021. According to a 1977 report in the Kyunghyang Shinmun which contained an interview of the police inspector in charge of the case Na Byeong-deok (나병덕; 羅炳德), it was a revenge-killing by Yeom. (Note: 『[...] 다음 해 1월경 [...] 동료의 저격을 받고 숨졌다. 김혁과 만주 등지서 함께 독립투사로 활동하던 염모는 해방 후 서울에서 각기 다른 단체에 소속돼 있으면서 서로 과거의 잘못을 비방, 갈등을 빚어왔다. 나병덕 등은 범인이 廉임을 밝혀낸 뒤 그를 만났으나 서로 더 이상의 보복을 그치기로 하고 金革의 피살에 대한 추궁은 덮어두기로 타협했다.』)

[Around January 1946], (Note: Jung does not address the conflicting date that Na provided for the murder.) Kim Hyeok was shot and killed by a colleague of his [...]. Kim and [Yeom Dong-jin], who were independence fighters together in Manchuria, returned to Seoul after the Liberation. They joined various organizations and began making criticisms and allegations about each other, which stirred conflict. After Na Byeong-deok and several others figured out Yeom was behind Kim's murder, they met with Yeom and agreed to put a stop to further violence and to cover up the investigation of Kim's murder.

— Cho Gab-je, from his interview with Na Byeong-deok

Based on the use of the word "colleague" (동료), Jung speculated that Yeom may have been on the task force alongside Kim. Jung further speculated that Kim had been aware of Yeom's past as a spy, which motivated Yeom to quash any chance of his past being outed. Following the incident, the special task force was dissolved and 24 special agents were fired from the Gyeonggi police.

== White Shirts Society ==
=== Establishment ===
After his escape to the South, Yeom briefly returned to Pyongyang and called a meeting of the remaining Daedongdan members. There, he asked them to also make their way South and join a reformed version of the group. In Seoul, Yeom recommended the reformed group use the name "White Shirts Society" (WSS), which he had favored for a while for its relation to both the Blue Shirts and the historical white clothes of Korean commoners. The group agreed.

Thus, according to most sources, the White Shirts Society was formed in November 1945. As he did in Daedongdan, Yeom played a significant role in recruiting new members for the WSS. Key to this was his charisma and status as a returning resistance fighter. When recounting stories about his past, he linked himself with the perceived selfless nationalism of his past organizations, especially the KPO. Jung theorized that this effectively associated the popular independence movement with the far-right actions of the WSS in the minds of new recruits.

=== Activities ===
Around this point, Yeom became extremely secretive, and refused to tell even his closest associates his schedule. He also required anyone who wished to meet him to meet him alone. He even avoided telling members the identity of other members. (Note: Ahn notes that because of this, there was a theory that there were over 30,000 members of the WSS by 1948, but he says it's impossible to verify.) Cilley also claimed that 60 young men guarded Yeom at all times, and that Yeom had numerous attempts on his life throughout the time Cilley knew him. Cilley also claimed Yeom had a fearsome reputation, with the nickname of the "Blind General" (『맹인장군』).

== Death ==
On June 25, 1950, the Korean War began with the First Battle of Seoul. Yeom did not evacuate from the city during the fighting. He was possibly captured or killed during this period, but the time, location, and cause of his death is unknown.

== Relationships ==
=== Kim Ku ===
Yeom and Kim had a complicated relationship that is subject to ongoing debate and controversy. At the Luoyang Military Academy, Yeom had been part of a faction of students that accused Kim and the KPG of embezzling funds meant for students. According to Ahn, this incident left Kim embittered towards Yeom. When they later reunited in Korea, Kim coldly responded to a tearful greeting by Yeom. Cilley even noted that Yeom had a seemingly contradictory attitude towards Kim, as he alternated between high praise (particularly of Kim's militant activities) and harsh criticism.

Cilley's report famously and controversially alleged that, depending on the interpretation of the document, either Yeom alone or Yeom and Kim together had been planning a military coup to oust Syngman Rhee and install Kim as a militant fascist leader of South Korea. According to Cilley, Yeom alleged that if Kim became the leader of South Korea, he would have 2 million troops that would be willing to invade the North.

Kim's assassination has been widely linked to Yeom, although the exact link is unclear. Ahn rejected the theory that Yeom ordered Kim's assassination, based on other evidence about their relationship and Kim's generally positive reception within the WSS.

=== Kim Du-han ===
Yeom is also remembered for his theorized connection to the "political gangster" (정치깡패) Kim Du-han. (Note: For decades, "political gangsters" were infamous for using violence to forward political causes and influence elections, particularly during the Syngman Rhee administration. They virtually ceased activity by the 1990s.) According to Ahn, after Yeom's defection to the South, he ordered that Kim, then the leader of a militant left-wing youth group associated with the Communist Party of Korea, (Note: Korea Youth Guard (조선청년전위대; 朝鮮靑年前衛隊)) be kidnapped and taken to the house of Oh Dong-jin (오동진) in Seoul. At Oh's house, Yeom persuaded Kim to join the right-wing. He appealed to the fact that Kim's father, Kim Chwajin, had been killed by communists. Kim apparently agreed and began violently forwarding right-wing causes in South Korea. Ahn noted the existence of theories that Yeom, via his connections to the American government, was later able to have Kim released from jail after his arrest on terrorism charges.

=== Sin Ik-hui ===
Sin was a long-time member of the Korean Provisional Government (KPG) and reportedly a consistent ally to Yeom, even during their exile in China.

Sin Ik-hui invited Yeom to join a group of underground political activists in the KPG that he had founded in December 1945, but Yeom declined in order to avoid putting Sin's political career at risk. According to Ahn, Sin was also the person who connected Yeom to the CIC in the first place during a meeting with a representative of US General John R. Hodge.

=== Other ===
Yeom was also associated with Yu Chin-san, whom he regularly met. According to Ahn, it was known that the two discussed the integration of various right-wing youth groups, including the Korean Democratic Youth Alliance.

According to Cilley, Yeom had been acting as a medium between the CIC and the 4th regiment of Republic of Korea Armed Forces before Kim's assassination. Some of the regiment's leadership allegedly shared Yeom's desire to overthrow Rhee and install Kim as leader.

== Personal life ==
=== Family ===
Shortly after his return to Pyongyang around 1940, Ahn had an arranged marriage to Choi Seong-ryul (최성률; 崔成律), a schoolteacher. The couple had no known children, other than a miscarried child some time around 1945 or 1946.

Choi was a graduate of a girls' high school in Nara, Japan. She taught at the Seomun Girls' High School (서문여고) in Pyongyang. Some time after she secured Yeom's release from jail in the aftermath of Hyeon's assassination, she was beaten at a west Pyongyang police station, which led to her miscarriage. Yeom left for the South before Choi, and she eventually followed. They reunited in Seoul in March 1946. In 1969, Lee investigated a rumor that she was alive and living in Naesu-dong, Jongno District, Seoul. However, she had apparently moved elsewhere before then, and the local government office had no record of where she went.

Yeom had a nephew through his sister, Kim Jong-jin (김종진). Kim gave several interviews about Yeom, including one for a 2002 episode of the South Korean documentary series Now I Can Say It.

=== Traits ===
Many of Yeom's contemporaries described him as charismatic and larger-than-life. According to cited accounts, returning resistance fighters often attracted respect and attention by sharing stories of their guerrilla activities.

Yeom was 171.2 cm (5 ft 7 1/2 in) tall. He was reportedly skilled at judo, and became a black belt before he graduated from Sunrin. He also wore black glasses at all times after going blind. According to Cilley, Yeom was fluent in English, German, French, Japanese, and Chinese. Yeom spoke to Cilley without the use of a translator, although he used a translator with other foreigners.

Whether he was fully blind has been called into question. Lee Seong-ryeol, who allegedly participated in the 1946 mission to assassinate Kim Il Sung, claimed that: (Note: 『1945년 9월 염동진을 처음 만났을 때만 해도, 그는 눈이 잘 안 보인다고는 했지만 맹인은 아니었다 [...] 모두 염 사령이 무슨 다른 생각이 있어서 맹인 행세를 하는 것으로 생각했다"고 말했다.』)

When I first met Yeom Dong-jin in September 1945, he said his eyesight was poor but that he wasn't blind [...] [E]veryone thought [he] merely acted blind for some other purpose.

== In popular culture ==
=== Fiction ===
- Portrayed by Lee Dae-ro in the 2002 SBS television series Rustic Period.
- A character based on Yeom, Yeom Seok-jin, is portrayed by Lee Jung-jin and appears in the 2015 film Assassination.

=== Non-fiction ===
- Yeom and the WSS were covered in the 20 January 2002 46th episode of the South Korean documentary series Now I Can Say It.

== See also ==
- Kim Won-bong

== Notes and references ==
=== Sources ===
- Jung, Byung Joon (2005), 백범 김구암살 배경과 백의사 [The Background of Assassination of Kim Koo and White-Shirts Society], 한국사연구 [The Journal of Korean History] (in Korean), vol. 128, 한국사연구회 [The Association For Korean Historical Studies], pp. 257–296, ISSN 1226-296X
- Jung, Byung Joon (May 2021), 관동군 밀정 염동진과 독립투사 김혁―낙양군관학교 동기생의 엇갈린 운명과 백의사의 기원 [Lyom Dongjin, Spy of Kwantung Army Kempeitai vs. Kim Hyuk, Independence Fighter: Cross Rancor of Alumni of Luoyang Military Academy and Origins of the White Shirts Society], 역사비평 [Critical Review of History] (in Korean), vol. 135, 역사문제연구소 [The Institute for Korean Historical Studies], pp. 289–331
- Jung, Byung Joon (August 2021), 현준혁 암살과 김일성 암살시도―평남 건준의 좌절된 '해방황금시대'와 백의사 [Assassination of Hyun Junhyuk and Assassination Attempt on Kim Ilsung: 'The Frustrated Golden Days' of Pyongnam Korean Committee for the Preparation of the Re-establishment of the State and the Origin of White Shirts Society], 역사비평 [Critical Review of History] (in Korean), no. 136, pp. 342–388
- Lee, Yeong-shin (1993), 염응택 신원사항(이영신 증언) [The Identity of Yeom Eung-taek (Lee Yeong-shin's Testimony)], 이영신의 현대사 발굴 비밀결사 백의사(상) [Lee Yeong-shin's Modern History Excavation: Secret Organization White Shirts Society (Part 1)] (in Korean), pp. 57–58
