= Chang Tŏksu =

Korean journalist (1894–1947)

Personal details
- Born: December 10, 1894 Chaeryong County, Hwanghae Province, Joseon Dynasty
- Died: December 2, 1947 (aged 52) Seoul, South Korea
- Party: Korea Democratic Party
- Education: Waseda University

Korean name
- Hangul: 장덕수
- Hanja: 張德秀
- RR: Jang Deoksu
- MR: Chang Tŏksu

Art name
- Hangul: 설산
- Hanja: 雪山
- RR: Seolsan
- MR: Sŏlsan

Chang Tŏksu (Korean: 장덕수; Hanja: 張德秀; December 10, 1894 – December 2, 1947) was a Korean politician, independence activist, journalist, and political scientist. He was the first editor-in-chief of the Dong-A Ilbo. He was the founder and second head of the Korea Democratic Party from 1945 to 1947.

Chang studied at Waseda University in Japan, where he became a leader of the Korean students' independence movement between 1914 and 1918.

He was assassinated by the right-wing terrorist group the White Shirts Society in 1947. The 10 suspects were charged with murder in a South Korean court, but the case was later transferred to an American military tribunal after right-wing Korean youths intimidated the courts. All of the defendants were found guilty, with 8 being sentenced to death by hanging and the other two to 10 years in prison each. After reviewing the case, U.S. Army General John R. Hodge confirmed two of the death sentences of Park Gwang-ok and Bae Hee-beom, who were viewed as the ringleaders, but reduced the other six death sentences to prison terms. Four of the death sentences were reduced to life in prison, and the other two to 10 years each. Hodge also reduced the 10-year sentences to five years each. Park Gwang-ok and Bae Hee-beom were both executed after the Korean War began. Another convict, Kim Seok-hwang, was later captured and executed by the North's Korean People's Army.

== Popular culture ==
- Portrayed by actor Han In-su in the 1981–82 TV series, 1st Republic.

== See also ==
- Kim Seong-su
- Song Jin-Woo
- Kim Ku
- Yun Bo-seon
- Shin Ik-hee
