= Naesu-dong =

- Interactive map of Naesu-dong
- Country: South Korea

Area
  - Total: 0.07 km^{2} (0.027 sq mi)

Korean name
- Hangul: 내수동
- Hanja: 內需洞
- RR: Naesu-dong
- MR: Naesu-dong

Naesu-dong (Korean: 내수동) is a dong (neighbourhood) of Jongno District, Seoul, South Korea. It is a legal dong (법정동) administered under its administrative dong (행정동), Sajik-dong.

== See also ==
- Administrative divisions of South Korea
