= White Shirts Society =

1945–c.1950 Korean anti-communist terrorist group

- Other name: White Clothes Society; White Shirt Society; Baikyi-sa
- Founding leader: Yeom Dong-jin
- Founded: November 1945
- Dissolved: Around 1950
- Ideology: Radical anti-communism
- Political position: Far-right

Korean name
- Hangul: 백의사
- Hanja: 白衣社
- RR: Baeguisa
- MR: Paegŭisa

The White Shirts Society (Korean: 백의사) was a Korean secret far-right militant organization that operated between World War II and the Korean War. It was mostly composed of young North Korean defectors to South Korea. It was militantly anti-communist and also opposed the trusteeship of Korea, especially by the Soviet Civil Administration in the North.

Because the group operated in secret, much of the information on it is derived from interviews and limited documents, and is still subject to uncertainty and debate. According to most scholars, the group was founded by Yeom Dong-jin in November 1945. It was the successor to Daedongdan, which was also founded by Yeom in 1944. A number of prominent assassinations and assassination attempts have been attributed to the group, including an assassination attempt on Kim Il Sung in 1946, the killing of Lyuh Woon-hyung in 1947, and the killing of Kim Ku in 1949. But there is disagreement on whether the group was responsible for many of its attributed attacks.

In 2001, South Korean researchers discovered a declassified document published by the U.S. National Archives and Records Administration that linked the WSS to the U.S. Counterintelligence Corps. (Note: RG 319, Entry 85A, Army Intelligence Document File, 1944–45 (ID File) no. 573339, Kim Koo: Background Information Concerning Assassination". The current events magazine Shin Dong-a has a Korean translation of the document online.) According to multiple interviews from former members of the group, the group trained and sent spies to the North to both gather military information for the U.S. and South Korea as well as stir local discontent.

Its activities slowed after the establishment of the First Republic of Korea in August 1948. Many of its members went on to join either the South Korean Army Headquarters or the Korea Liaison Office, the South Korean military's intelligence unit. Yeom disappeared and was likely killed in the early days of the Korean War.

== Background ==
From 1910 to the end of World War II, Korea was under Japanese rule. Some Koreans went into exile, especially in China, where they fought against the Japanese. The ideological gap between left and right-leaning Koreans intensified while they were abroad. Many of the right-leaning Koreans became associated with the Provisional Government of Korea (KPG), the self-proclaimed government-in-exile that aligned itself with the Kuomintang (KMT).

=== Yeom Dong-jin ===
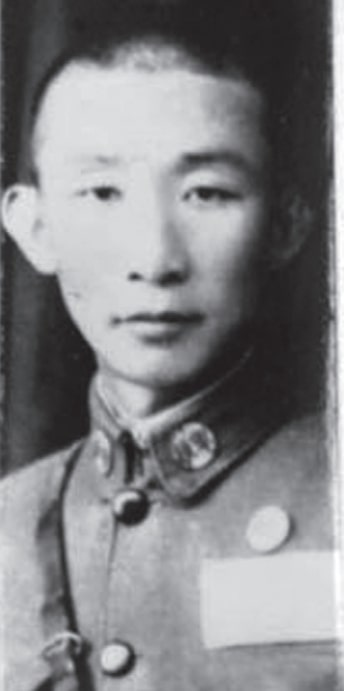
Yeom Dong-jin, upon his 1935 graduation from the Military Academy. One of two known photos of him, as of 2021.

Yeom Dong-jin was among the Koreans who went into exile in China and aligned themselves with the KPG and KMT. In 1934, he enrolled in a joint KPG–KMT course for Korean independence fighters at the Luoyang Military Academy, and trained as a guerrilla. It is during this period when Yeom came into close contact with Kim Ku, one of the administrators of the course. After a scandal emerged in which Kim was accused of embezzling funds, Yeom became a prominent critic of Kim.

All sources agree that, after graduating from the Academy, Yeom became associated with the Blue Shirts Society, a secret militant Chinese ultranationalist group within the KMT. According to the later testimonies of former White Shirts Society agents, (Note: Testimonies from Paek Kwan-ok (백관옥), Paek Kŭn-ok (백근옥), Choe Ui-ho (최의호), Jo Jae-guk (조재국), and Seon-woo Gil-yeong (선우길영), among others.) after the 1937 outbreak of the Second Sino-Japanese War, Yeom worked in the statistical survey department for the National Revolutionary Army (Chinese: 國民政府軍事委員會調查統計局, aka. "Jungtong"). The group performed espionage, assassination and information-gathering activities for the KMT.

The general consensus among Korean scholars is that Yeom was then captured by the military police of the Japanese Kwantung Army and tortured. Under duress from the torture, Yeom then agreed to become a spy on behalf of the Japanese. However, according to U.S. military intelligence, Yeom was captured and tortured by the Chinese Communist Party and not the Japanese. Despite this disagreement, all sources agree that the torture caused Yeom to lose his eyesight. Eventually, Yeom was somehow able to secure his release and return to his hometown of Pyongyang.

== Daedongdan ==
- Daedongdan
- Hangul: 대동단
- Hanja: 大同團
- RR: Daedongdan
- MR: Taedongdan

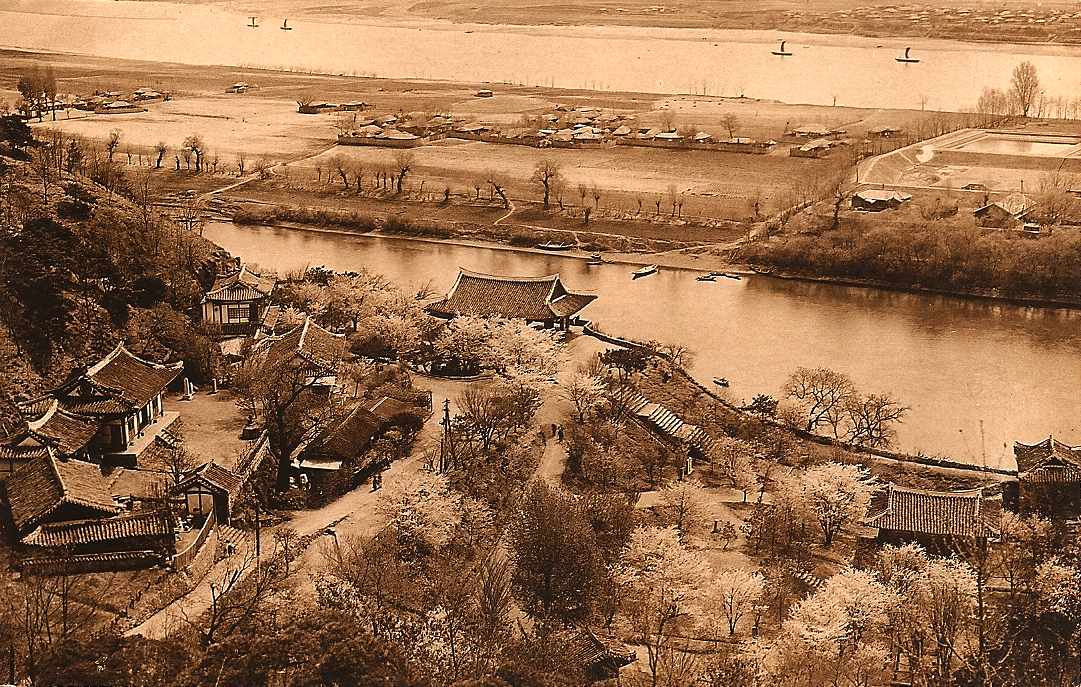
Yongmyongsa, the Buddhist temple where Daedongdan was conceptualized (c. 1930s)

In Pyongyang in August 1944, (Note: Lebedev gives the founding year as 1943, but the majority of Korean-language sources give a 1944 starting date.) Yeom founded the anti-communist group Daedongdan, (Note: Not to be confused with the 1919 group of the same name, Daedongdan) which was the direct predecessor to the White Shirts Society.

The group was first conceptualized at the Buddhist Yongmyong Temple, (Note: Yongmyongsa was later destroyed during the Korean War.) which was then a hotbed for both left- and right-wing nationalist gatherings. The monk Park Go-bong (박고봉) suggested that a right-leaning group be created to counter the left-leaning Korean Independence League, which was created by Lyuh Woon-hyung in August 1944.

Yeom and Park Go-bong led the group together. Early members of the group included Paek Kwan-ok and Seonu Bong (선우봉). According to the scholar Ahn Gi-seok, Yeom recruited most of the other members, among whom were some middle school students. There is no evidence, including from later testimonies, that the group participated in any pro-Korean independence activities.

=== Assassination of Hyŏn Chunhyŏk ===
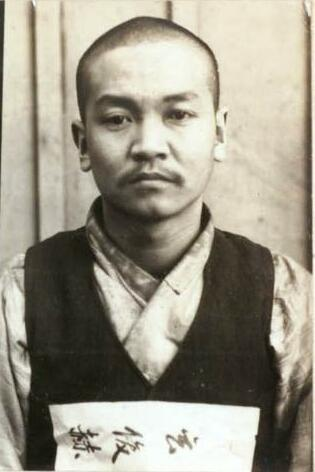
Hyŏn in 1935

On September 3, 1945, (Note: Conflicting reports of dates over several decades, including 2, 3, 4, 18, and September 28, but Jung claims it is 3, based on a photo of Hyŏn's tombstone. See Hyŏn Chunhyok#Date) the general consensus is that Daedongdan members Paek, Seonu, and Park Jin-yang assassinated Hyŏn Chunhyŏk, the head of committee of the Communist Party of Korea for South Pyongan Province. For the assassination, Paek was wearing the uniform of a left-wing militant group run by Hyŏn. Paek ran up to Hyŏn, shot him, and slipped away.

The assassins were never caught and fled to the South. Yeom was briefly arrested in suspicion of being connected to the murder, but was soon released. He then fled south along with other members.

==== Identity of attackers and historiography ====
While it is now the general consensus that Daedongdan was behind the assassination, until the 1990s, it was widely believed that left-wing forces were behind the attack, particularly due to the confusion over the uniform. However, consensus shifted after the publication of Lee Yeong-shin's 1994 book Secret Organization White Shirts Society and the 2002 release of a 1986 audio recording of a Daedongdan member confessing to plotting the murder.

In 2021, Jung theorized that the murder occurred primarily due to the factional conflicts in Pyongyang security shortly after the war. Paek's older brother was the head of a police faction that was in conflict with the organization led by Hyŏn. Jung thus speculated that the motive was two-fold: firstly it was an opportunity to portray Hyŏn's group in a negative light, and secondly it was an opportunity for Yeom and the group to eliminate a communist leader.

== History ==
=== Establishment ===
The general consensus is that Yeom founded and became leader of the White Shirts Society (WSS) in either October or November 1945, with most sources citing the November founding date. (Note: According to Jung Byung Joon, there are two other theories on how the group was established. A second theory is based on an August 1947 report that Yeom gave to US General Albert Wedemeyer. It stated that the WSS was founded on August 2, 1942, and had over 67,300 members, including 26,000 in North Korea and Manchuria and 41,300 in South Korea. Jung expressed skepticism about the claims of the group's size, although he did not doubt that it had a presence in both North Korea and Manchuria by 1947. A third theory is based on the June 29, 1949, Cilley report, in which an American intelligence agent who interviewed Yeom claims that the core of the group was founded in 1935.) The group was founded in Nagwon-dong, Seoul, and headquartered in a Gungjeong-dong house that the wealthy Oh Dong-jin purchased from a Japanese man for the group.

Shortly after the WSS's establishment, on November 23, 1945, the Sinuiju Incident occurred. Over a hundred anti-communist students eventually defected to the South in the aftermath, and many joined either the militant Central Political Task Force (정치공작대; 政治工作隊) (Note: Translation of group name from Park Myung-Lim. Also called "Department of Political Intelligence" by Andrei Lankov.) in the KPG and/or the WSS. Jung speculated that part of this was because they gravitated towards other North Korean escapees and respected Yeom's reputation.

On February 19, 1946, the WSS appeared in a U.S. military intelligence report. The head of the Gunsan police department claimed the WSS was headquartered in Jeonju, and had a presence in both North Jeolla Province and South Jeolla Province via three armed trucks. A politician from Jeonju also claimed on February 8 that the WSS was a right-wing terrorist group.

=== 1946 assassination attempts and Cho Man-sik ===
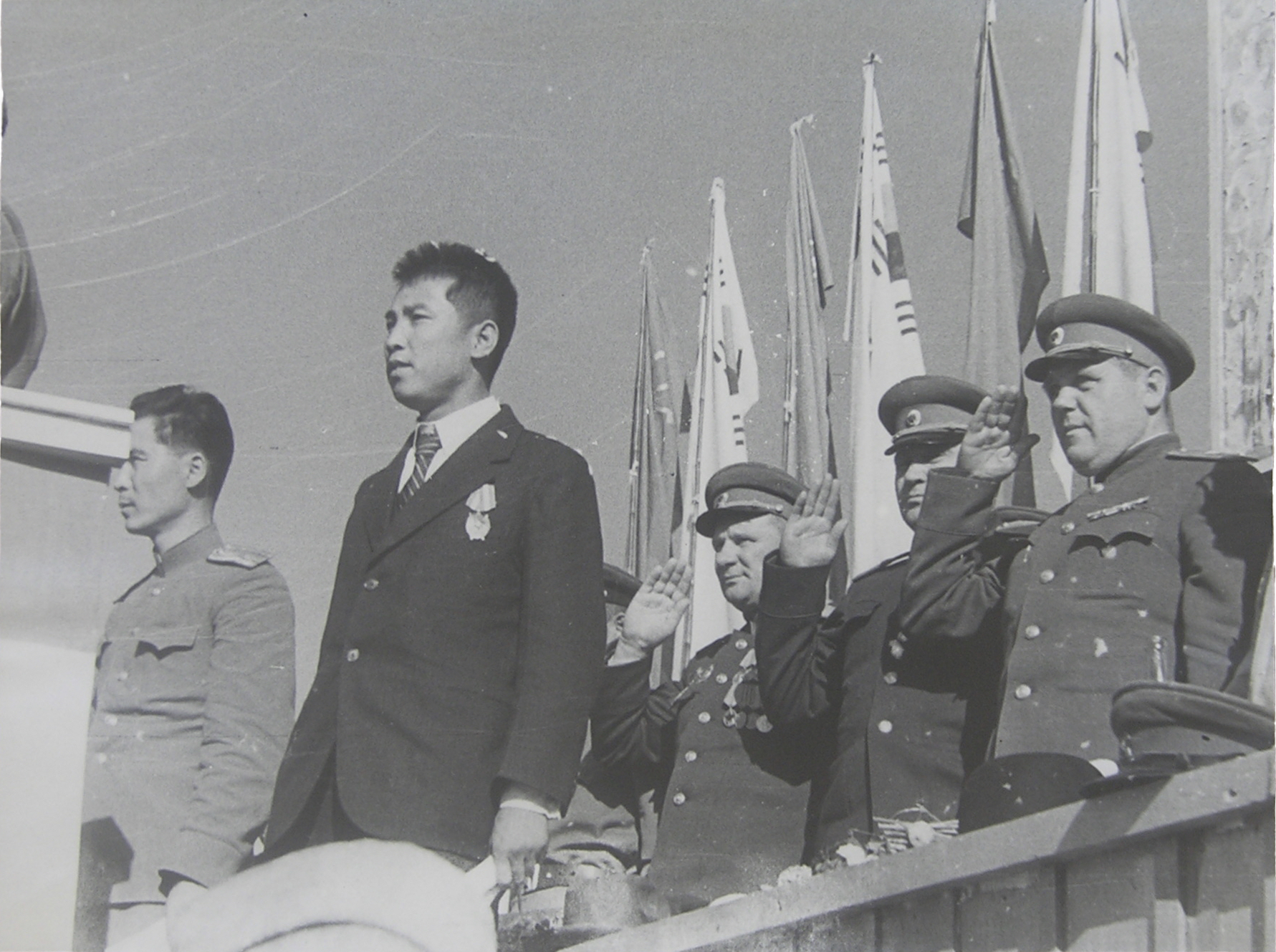
Kim Il Sung (second from left) in 1945, with Soviet military officers

Shortly after the establishment of the Soviet-backed Provisional People's Committee of North Korea, the WSS made a number of assassination attempts on North Korean politicians within a span of two weeks. According to interviews with former members of the WSS, these assassination attempts were done in collaboration with the CPTF and KPG.

All of the WSS's assassination attempts in early 1946 failed. They attempted to assassinate Kim Il Sung on March 1, 1946, Choe Yong-gon on March 5 or March 7, Kim Chaek on March 9, and Kang Ryang-uk on March 12. (Note: According to Weisser, a recent article by Ki Kwang-seo found that, other than for Kim Il Sung's assassination attempt, the dates are hard to pin down with certainty.) Choe and Kang would later become key allies for Kim Il Sung. However, the attacks made the WSS infamous and brought them to the attention of both the U.S. and USSR. According to a March 22, 1946, Soviet report about the WSS:

[The WSS] is under the direct leadership of Kim Ku. It includes Koreans who returned from China and members of some youth groups. Their goal is to kill members of the Communist Party of Korea, the People's Party of Korea, and the leaders of the [Provisional North Korean government].

In addition, Bae alleged that around this time, several WSS agents attempted to help Cho Man-sik escape his house arrest at the Koryo Hotel. But Cho reportedly refused to escape, and said "If I go south, who will our comrades in the North have to rely on for survival?" (Note: 『내가 월남하면 북조선 동포들은 누굴 의지해서 산단 말인가?』)

=== Espionage in North Korea ===
According to a written statement by Yeom, from January to September 1946, the WSS collaborated with the U.S. Counterintelligence Corps (CIC) and the military intelligence of the United States Forces Korea (USFK) in training and sending spies to North Korea. About 20 men were dispatched each month. Ahn also noted that in early May 1946, WSS agents infiltrated the North to gather intelligence on Northern troop deployments. Of particular interest was learning what equipment had been sent by the Soviets.

Historian James Jongsoo Lee believed it was unlikely that the U.S. supported the WSS's terrorist attacks on North Korea which occurred within the same timeframe. Lee wrote:

An aspect of the popular resistance against the Soviet rule that made such resistance difficult was the fact that it received very little or almost no support—either financial or in terms of personnel—from nationalists in southern Korea or from the U.S. military government. This needs to be qualified by the fact that sporadic acts of violence against the Soviet occupation and the communists in northern Korea were staged by [the White Shirts Society] and other right-wing elements from southern Korea in spring 1946 and that the U.S. military intelligence and, later, the CIA sent agents into northern Korea as early as 1946... As for the American intelligence and counter-intelligence activities in northern Korea, these seemed to have been mainly for purposes of gathering information and most likely did not give support to oppositional elements in northern Korea.

These cross-border espionage activities stopped due to financial difficulties, training issues, and tightened security at the North–South Korean border. (Note: The border around the time of the WSS was the 38th parallel north; the current Korean Demilitarized Zone (DMZ) was set only after the Korean War and based on the pre-War 38th parallel border.) However, the CIC continued to collaborate with the WSS on other activities until the latter's dissolution.

=== Assassination of Lyuh Woon-hyung ===
An alleged member of the group, Han Ji-geun, assassinated Lyuh Woon-hyung on July 19, 1947. According to most sources, the WSS was behind the murder. However, the scholar Ahn Gi-seok contradicted this narrative in 2005 by claiming Han was not a member of the WSS.

In 2021, Jung Byung Joon noted that Park Gyeong-gu, the WSS's Deputy Commander, had said in an undated interview that Lyuh was assassinated by order of the WSS.

Yeom was first introduced to the men who would assassinate Lyuh via an advisor of the group, Kim Yeong-cheol. The assassins, including Shin Dong-un (신동운) and Kim Heung-seong (김흥성), were given American-made .45 caliber pistols for the mission. Afterwards, Yeom worked with a pro-Japanese police officer Roh Deok-sul (노덕술) to cover up the case.

=== Other activities ===
Between 1946 and 1948, the WSS created the "Manchuria Plan" (만주계획), in which they would build a right-wing guerrilla army north of the China–North Korea border. Yeom enlisted the help of Kim Ku, who in turn reached out to his long-time ally Chiang Kai-shek. However, this plan never came to pass due to Chiang's 1949 loss in the Chinese Civil War.

Most sources also believe the group assassinated Chang Deok-soo on December 2, 1947. (Note: Korean scholars and Cilley are in widespread agreement that these assassinations were done by the WSS, although Cilley notes there is no concrete evidence linking the WSS to them.)

=== Assassination of Kim Ku ===
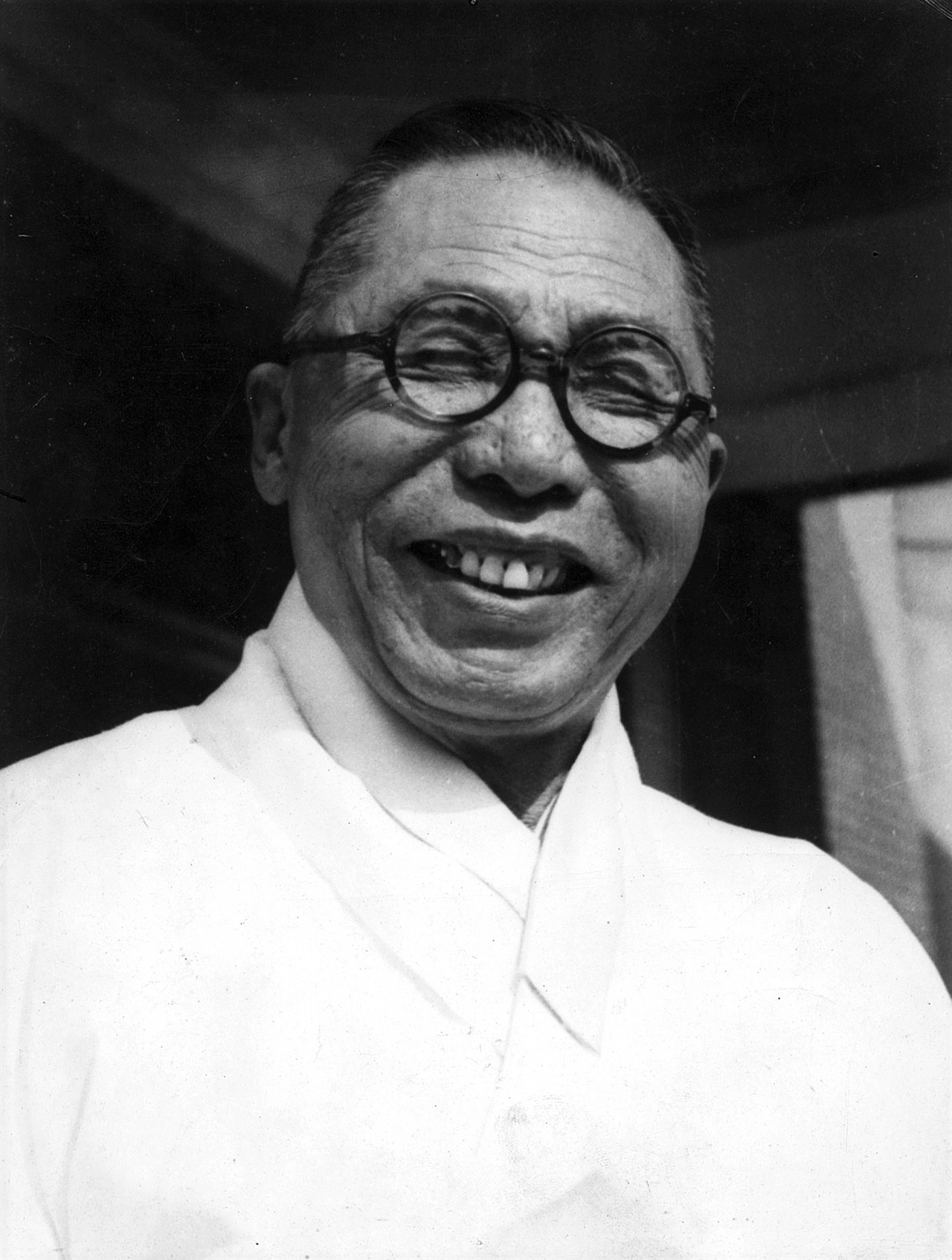
Kim Ku in 1949

On June 26, 1949, Ahn Doo-hee assassinated Kim Ku. According to Cilley, Ahn had been an informant and then an agent of the CIC, and may have been ordered by Yeom to assassinate Kim. Cilley also alleged that the Yeom and Kim had been plotting a military coup d'état against incumbent President Syngman Rhee before Kim's death. However, Ahn Gi-seok casts doubt on whether Yeom ordered Kim's killing, citing the fact that Yeom's feelings towards Kim were mixed and that many WSS members highly respected Kim Ku.

=== Decline and dissolution ===
According to Ahn and Jung, after the establishment of the First Republic of South Korea in August 1948, the role of the WSS and other private militant organizations began to decrease. While most agents had other jobs to return to, around 100 agents had no other place to go. A former WSS member who became an intelligence officer at the Republic of Korea Army Headquarters recruited many WSS members for his department.

In February 1949, General Charles Willoughby, the chief of intelligence for General Douglas MacArthur, sent an envoy to Yeom and requested they work together to acquire information on the North. As a result of this interaction, on June 1, 1949, the Korea Liaison Office was established. The remaining WSS agents ended up working there.

On June 25, 1950, the Korean War began with the First Battle of Seoul. Yeom did not evacuate the city and disappeared, with most scholars speculating that he was captured and killed.

After the war, the group's headquarters passed into the ownership of the Attorney General Lee In. After the May 16 coup in 1961, the Korean Central Intelligence Agency took ownership of the property. It later served as the exact site of the 1979 assassination of President Park Chung Hee.

== Description ==
=== Name ===
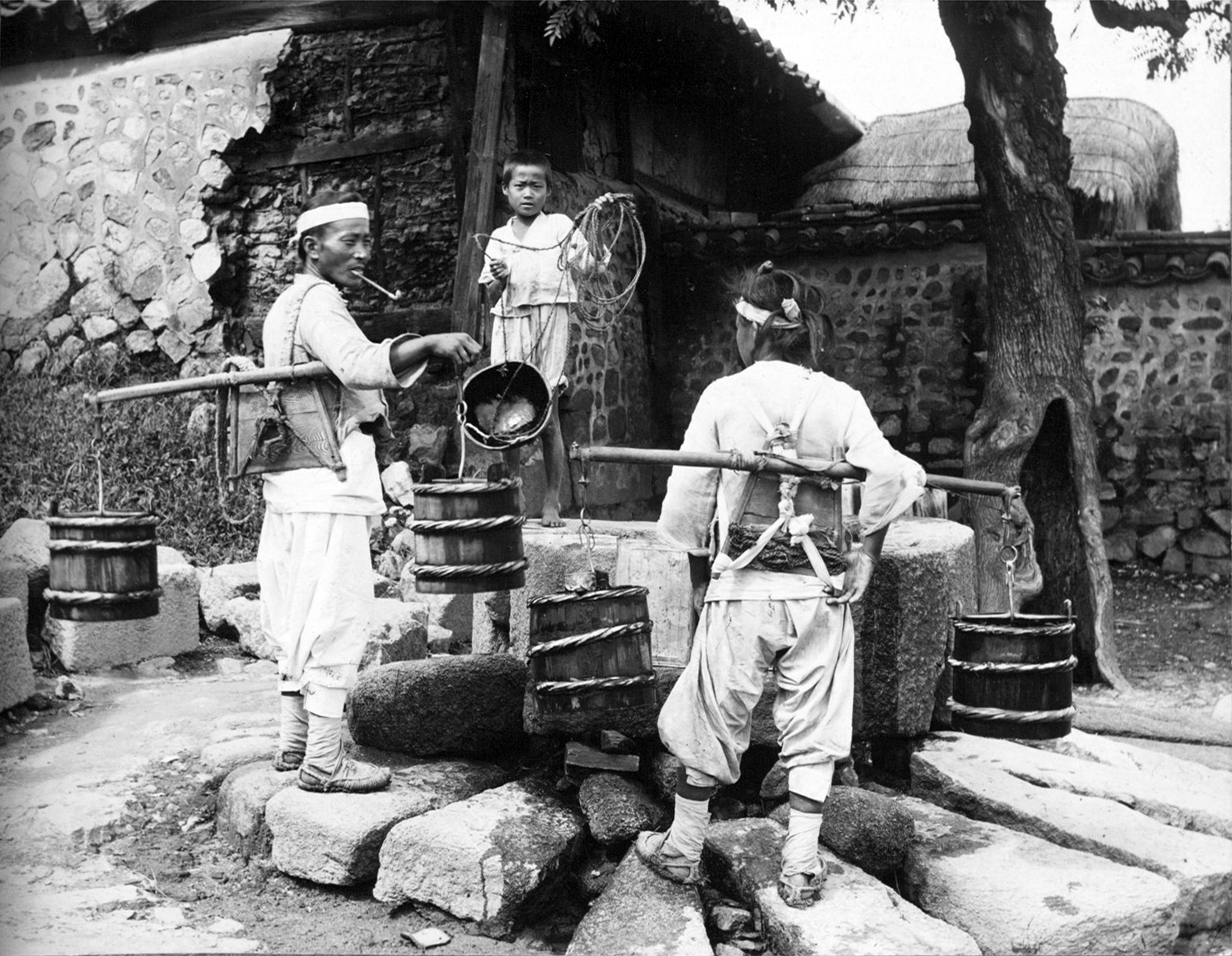
The White Shirts Society was named for the white clothes historically worn by Korean commoners

The group's name was inspired by the names of other ultranationalist organizations, but especially by the name of the Blue Shirts Society. The Blue Shirts were in turn inspired by other fascist groups with similar names, including the Italian Blackshirts, the Romanian Greenshirts, and the Spanish Blueshirts. The name is also a reference to the Korean expression "white-clothed people" (백의민족; 白衣民族), which refers to everyday Korean people, as Korean commoners historically wore white clothing.

=== Structure ===
For leadership, it is widely agreed that Yeom served as the commander-in-chief. According to several sources, Park Jin-goo (박진구) was the Deputy Commander.

In 2021, Jung Byung Joon described the leadership as follows:

Position (English)	Position (Korean)	Holder(s)	Notes
Commander-in-chief	총사령	Yeom Dong-jin	
Deputy Commander	부사령	Park Gyeong-gu	박경구; 朴經九. Born in South Hamgyong Province, worked officially as Deputy Commander of the National Defense Corps. (Note: Organization was later involved in the 1951 National Defense Corps incident)
Advisors	고문	Yu Chin-san; Baek Chang-seop; Kim Yeong-cheol	All were former KPG.: Yu later became a representative for multiple terms in the South Korean National Assembly.; Baek (백창섭; 白昌燮) was previously Director of Special Dispatch (특파사무국) in the KPG.; Kim (김영철) had been a member of the KPG's militant wing the Korean Patriotic Organization.
Director of the Organization	조직국장	Ahn Byeong-seok	안병석; 安炳奭. Ahn was officially the head of a labor union (노총 조직부장).
Director of Intelligence	정보국장	Kim Myeong-uk	김명욱; 金明煜. Later a Bureau Chief (과장) in the South Korean Ministry of National Defense.
Executive Director	집행국장	Han Seung-gyu	한승규; 韓承奎, birth name 韓哲民. (Note: Hangul for birth name not provided.)
Chief Secretary	비서실장	Paek Kwan-ok	Born in Pyongyang. One of the Daedongdan assassins of Hyŏn Chunhyŏk.
Director of Training	훈련국장	Seon U-bong	선우봉. Born in North Pyongan Province.
Director of General Affairs	총무국장	Jeong Byeong-mo	정병모; 鄭柄模. Second son of a post office manager in Pyongyang.

Cilley claimed the organization had a "Revolutionary Group" or "Special Attack Corps". The Corps' commandoes were divided into five groups, with each group containing four members. When an assassination order came through, commandoes would swear a blood oath to give their lives to the cause if needed. He claimed Kim Ku's assassin Ahn Doo-hee was a member of the first group of the Corps.

=== Initiation ===
According to Ahn Gi-seok, the group had a secret initiation ritual. The initiation would be held in a secret room inside the headquarters that had two locks on the door. The initiate would meet Yeom first, kneel, and raise their right hand. They'd then make the following pledge: (Note: 『나는 백의사 단원으로 입단하면서 다음과 같이 서약한다. 하나, 나는 조국의 자주적인 정부수립을 위해 목숨을 걸고 맡은 바 임무를 완수한다. 하나, 나는 목숨을 걸고 백의사의 명령에 복종한다. 하나, 나는 어떠한 경우에도 조국과 백의사를 배반하지 않는다.』)

As an initiate of the White Shirts Society, I pledge the following.

One, for the sake of the establishment of an independent government in the fatherland, I will risk my life to complete any mission given to me.

One [sic], I will obey the commands of the White Shirts Society even at the risk of death.

One, no matter the circumstance, I will never betray the fatherland or the White Shirts Society.

The initiate would then make a cut on their finger and sign a contract with blood.

=== Training spies ===
According to interviews with group members, the WSS and CIC collaborated on training and sending spies to the North. According to Ahn, the training was held at a WSS stronghold in Jeongneung-dong. (Note: The house was an isolated mansion that used to be a villa for a wealthy Japanese man. After the Second Battle of Seoul, the house was used as the headquarters of the Intelligence Detachment of the South Korean Armed Forces as a secret training ground for operatives that would infiltrate the North.) The selection criteria were strict; all selectees were required to be able to fluently speak in the local dialect of the region they were being sent to. For each province, two native-born agents would be selected. According to Ahn, Park Hyeon-yeong served as the administrator for the training. (Note: 박현영; 朴玄英. He had been a member of Daedongdan before he joined the WSS.)

== Relationship with other organizations ==
=== Counterintelligence Corps ===
According to a written statement by Yeom, the WSS worked with the CIC since January 1946. The declassified Cilley report confirmed that Cilley had known Yeom since approximately October 1947. (Note: Cilley stated that he had known Yeom for around 20 months prior to writing the June 1949 document.) The report also confirmed WSS agents were used for in CIC initiatives between 1947 and 1948.

According to Ahn, Yeom was first connected to the CIC via Sin Ik-hui, with whom he had been close during their exile in China. Sin invited Yeom to his house and introduced Yeom to the Korean-American CIC agent Lee Sun-yong. Lee conveyed a request to Sin from U.S. General John R. Hodge, who wanted Sin to either disband his political organization or use it to spy on the North for the US. Furious, Sin stormed out of the room. However, Sin's aide Jo Jung-seo proposed that the WSS take up the espionage role instead. Yeom's main link to the CIC became Lee's superior officer Major Whitaker, (Note: 위테커; English spelling uncertain.) the head of the Seoul branch of the CIC, who promised to protect the WSS as long as it provided the U.S. information on the North.

The group was also connected to another CIC agent Jang Seok-yun.

=== Korean Provisional Government ===
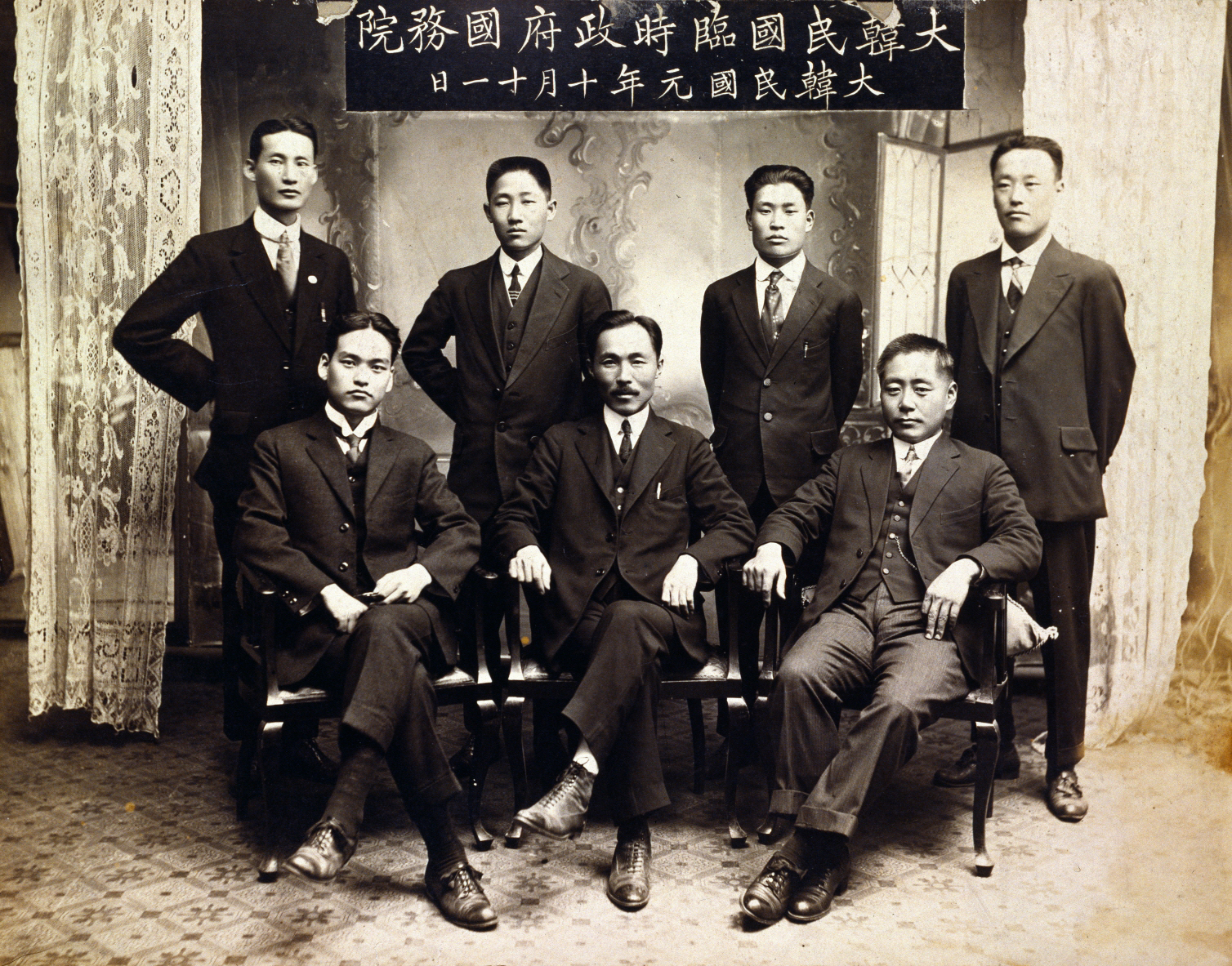
The Korean Provisional Government upon its founding in 1919

Many of the WSS leadership were either actively or previously associated with the KPG. The groups were particularly linked via the long-time friendship between Yeom and Sin Ik-hui.

The two groups were particularly linked via a group founded by Sin on December 6, 1945, called the Central Political Task Force (CPTF). The CPTF was a covert paramilitary organization that operated under the KPG's Ministry of Internal Affairs. Their objective was to influence politics, usually through means of intelligence or violence, to the favor of both the KPG and even Sin personally. However, the two organizations were not explicitly linked; Sin reportedly even offered Yeom a position in the group, which Yeom declined in order to avoid explicitly associating the WSS with the KPG. Lee Seong-ryeol, a WSS agent, said in an early 2000s interview: (Note: 『조직 운영에 있어서는 ‘백의사=중앙정치공작대’라고 해도 과언이 아니었다』)

In terms of organizational management, it would not be an exaggeration to say that the WSS = the CPTF.

=== Northwest Youth League ===
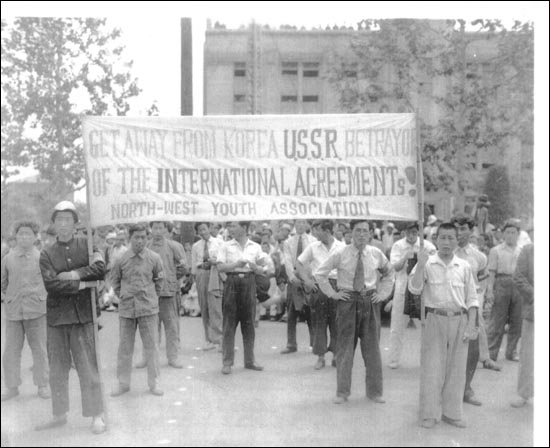
Northwest Youth League publicly demanding the withdrawal of Soviet troops (May 31, 1948)

The Northwest Youth League (NYL) is also considered to be closely tied to the WSS. The NYL was an anti-communist youth group founded via a merger of several smaller groups on November 30, 1946. Their members were mostly if not entirely from North Korea, and were infamously violent. They had a number of high-profile clashes with both the left-wing and the police.

Yu Chin-san, a likely cadre in the WSS, led one of the groups that merged into the NYL.

=== Great Korean Independent Labor League ===
The WSS has also been linked to the right-wing labor union Great Korean Independent Labor League (GKILL). GKILL was founded in response to the left-wing General Federation of Trade Unions of Korea.

== Members ==
=== Description ===
Members shared the WSS's desire to eliminate all communist and anti-government politicians. Most were right-leaning defectors that came from North Korea, and a majority of them were followers of Kim Ku.

Members came from many employment backgrounds. Yeom made a significant effort to have members become police officers or join the South Korean Ministry of National Defense. Other agents worked as firefighters, merchants, industrialists, and farmers. Yeom also recruited members of labor unions in the South. Cilley speculated that the group operated not only within the Korean peninsula but also in Manchuria, although he noted there was uncertainty in both the scope and size of the group.

They were sworn to secrecy in their activities, and constantly monitored to ensure they kept secrets and obeyed orders. Those accused of wrongdoing were examined via "comrade trials" (동지 재판). If found guilty of a lesser crime, the member would be subjected to a "cripple's punishment" (앉은뱅이 형벌): solitary confinement in a guarded cell within the headquarters for either ten days or a month. If found guilty of a greater crime, they would be subject to expulsion (출당).

Yeom also made a point of hiding the identity of members from each other. Ahn Gi-seok notes that, because of this, there is a theory that there were over 30,000 members of the WSS by 1948, but that the theory is impossible to verify.

=== Petty crime ===
Members of the WSS were arrested for petty crime on several occasions. While they claimed their crimes were unrelated to the WSS, Jung speculated that they were intended to procure funds for the group.

On May 2, 1946, Seonu Bong and member Kim Yung-gi (김융기) were sentenced to 1 year and 6 months in prison and 3 years of probation for an attempted robbery. They were released on November 30, 1946. They attempted another robbery on January 5, 1947, that was thwarted, although they managed to escape. On February 12, 1947, they extorted over 100,000 won from a businessman in Donam-dong, which Jung speculated was to fund the WSS's espionage operations. On February 27, while attempting another robbery, they were caught and arrested in Jongno District. On June 1, 1947, they each received sentences to two years in prison.

=== Other notable members ===
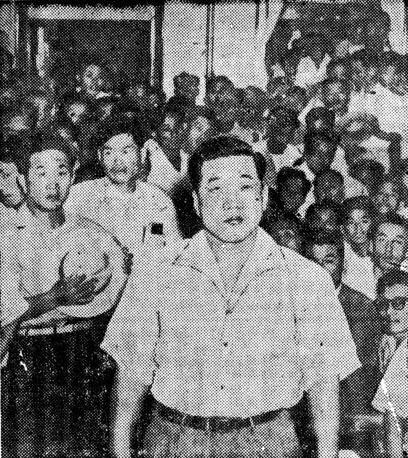
- Kim Du-han, the "political gangster", in 1955
  Kim Du-han – The infamous "political gangster" Kim Du-han has been considered functionally a member of the group. During his lifetime, he denied being a member, and called himself an "advisor" at best. However, according to Lee Yeong-shin's 1994 book, Yeom considered Kim a "lackey" (꼬봉) and issued him instructions and missions to forward the goals of the WSS.

== See also ==
- Ilminism
- Korean National Youth Association
- Korean conflict
