= Kim Hyeok (independence activist) =

Korean independence activist (1915–1945)

- Born: 17 October 1915; Pyongyang, Heianhoku Province, Korea, Empire of Japan
- Died: 24 November 1945 (aged 30); Seoul, southern Korea
- Cause of death: Shooting
- Resting place: Jangchungdan Park
- Other name: Kim Seung-eun
- Known for: Korean independence activist; Theorized to have been assassinated by Yeom Dong-jin

Korean name
- Hangul: 김혁
- Hanja: 金革
- RR: Gim Hyeok
- MR: Kim Hyŏk

Kim Hyeok (Korean: 김혁; 17 October 1915 – 24 November 1945) was a Korean independence activist and militant. He was later known as Kim Seung-eun (Korean: 김승은; Hanja: 金勝恩).

== Early life ==
Kim was born on 17 October 1915, in Pyongyang, Heianhoku Province (South Pyongan Province), Korea, Empire of Japan. His father was Kim Ch'andu and mother Pak Sŏngdu. (Note: 김찬두; 金燦斗 and 박성두; 朴聖斗) He had two older brothers and seven younger sisters.

He came from a middle-class background; his father had income from real estate and a shop he owned. The household also had two live-in service employees.

At age 15, he transferred from the Soongsil Middle School in Pyongyang to the Bongcheon Middle School. (Note: 봉천중학; 奉天中学) After completing middle school, he went to China.

== Career ==
In 1932, he went into exile in China to join the Korean Provisional Government (KPG) in their resistance against the Japanese occupation of Korea. In February 1934, he attended a joint KPG–KMT training course for resistance fighters at Luoyang that was jointly run by the KPG and the Chinese Kuomintang (KMT).

Two of the Korean instructors of the course, Chi Ch'ŏngch'ŏn and Kim Ku, frequently clashed over authority and funding for the class. Students were also ideologically divided, and factions that supported either Ji and Kim emerged. While Kim was nominally on Kim Gu's side, he and several other students, including Yeom Dong-jin, switched over to Ji's faction after a scandal. Kim and Yeom then joined the Ji-aligned New Korea Independence Party. (Note: 신한독립당; 新韓獨立黨)

After escaping the KNRP training camp, he went to Shanghai.

=== Vigorous Blood Group ===
In January 1936, Kim, Oh Myeon-jik, and many other Kim Gu-aligned alumni of the academy founded a militant independence organization called the Vigorous Blood Group. (Note: 맹혈단; 猛血團) Some members were anarchists, although Kim and some other members were right-leaning.

=== Prison and release ===
Kim and several others planned to assassinate the Japanese consul general in Shanghai, but were arrested by Japanese military police on 6 March 1936. Kim Hyeok was returned to Korea, and in April 1937, sentenced to three years in prison by the Haeju district court. According to a contemporary newspaper article, he expressed regret for having trained as an independence fighter while in prison. He was released on parole on 26 September 1939.

After his release, he likely returned to China. He remained there until the Liberation of Korea. Shortly afterwards, he departed from Beijing on 27 September and arrived in Korea on 10 October 1945. Afterwards, it is unclear if Kim participated in any of the various groups that other former independence activists joined. However, it is known that in mid-October 1945 he posted an advertisement seeking to reconnect with his former classmates from Luoyang, and successfully reconnected with several Kim Gu supporters.

=== Gyeonggi Police ===
Kim then became involved with a special task force in the Gyeonggi Province Police Department. Around late October 1945, the unit decided to assassinate 10 Japanese policemen. Kim Hyeok was involved in the 2 November assassination of Inspector Saiga Shichirō. (Note: Japanese: 齋賀七郞)

== Assassination and legacy ==
Around 5pm on 24 November 1945, Kim Hyeok was murdered in Seoul. According to several contemporary newspaper reports, there were three culprits, including one on a bicycle. One culprit, looking to be around 30 years old and dressed in a suit, fired a bullet from a pistol that pierced Kim's heart, killing him instantly. Another culprit then grabbed a red leather bag in Kim's possession, and fled the scene.

The incident was largely assumed to be a simple robbery, although it was noted by contemporary and later reports that Kim had been an independence activist. However, interviews with Na Byeong-deok, (Note: 나병덕; 羅炳德) the head of the special task force, revealed that the man behind the murder was Yeom Dong-jin, who had been feuding with Kim. Na and several others met with Yeom after they learned the truth, and agreed to stop further violence and to hamper investigations of the case.

Na and others held a large funeral for Kim in Jangchungdan Park.

=== Awards ===
In 1995, he was posthumously awarded an Order of Merit for National Foundation, 5th grade by the government of South Korea for his independence activities.

== Notes and references ==
=== Sources ===
- Jung, Byung Joon (May 2021), 관동군 밀정 염동진과 독립투사 김혁―낙양군관학교 동기생의 엇갈린 운명과 백의사의 기원 [Lyom Dongjin, Spy of Kwantung Army Kempeitai vs. Kim Hyuk, Independence Fighter: Cross Rancor of Alumni of Luoyang Military Academy and Origins of the White Shirts Society], 역사비평 [Critical Review of History] (in Korean), vol. 135, 역사문제연구소 [The Institute for Korean Historical Studies], pp. 289–331
- Hwang, Dongyoun (30 September 2016), Anarchism in Korea: Independence, Transnationalism, and the Question of National Development, 1919–1984, State University of New York Press
- Jeong, Jin-seok (29 July 2009), 일제 고등경찰 피살 사건 미스터리 [The Mystery of the Murdered High-ranking Japanese Police Officer], Shin Dong-a Ilbo (in Korean)
