= Korean Youth Association =

1949–1953 political organisation in South Korea

Korean Youth Association 대한청년단
- Leader: Shin Song-mo
- Founded: 19 December 1948
- Dissolved: 10 September 1953
- Preceded by: Korean National Youth Association (parts); Daedong Youth League; Other youth groups
- Succeeded by: Liberal Party
- Colours: Red

Korean name
- Hangul: 대한청년단
- Hanja: 大韓靑年團
- RR: Daehan cheongnyeondan
- MR: Taehan ch'ŏngnyŏndan

The Korean Youth Association (Daehan Youth Corps; Korean: 대한청년단) was a right-wing youth organisation in South Korea formed on 19 December 1948, through the merger of various right-wing youth groups, such as the Northwest Youth Association, centred around the Daedong Youth League.

Following the 1952 South Korean presidential election, as internal strife within both the ruling Liberal Party and the Korean Youth Association persisted for an extended period, Syngman Rhee issued a statement on 10 September 1953, announcing the dissolution of the Korean Youth Association and the incorporation of its members into the civil militia.

== History ==
As infighting among right-wing youth groups intensified and new organisations continued to spring up, Syngman Rhee ordered the unification of these groups. Driven also by the need to keep Lee Beom-seok's rapidly growing Korean National Youth Association in check, Rhee's directive led to the creation of the Korean Youth Association; this organisation functioned as a quasi-state entity with Rhee serving as its president. Its supreme committee members included Chang Taek-sang, Ji Cheong-cheon, No Tae-jun, Yu Chin-san, Suh Sang-chul and Kang Nak-won.

It was composed of 10 provincial regions, 17 regional regions, 180 city regions and 4,230 county and township regions. By 31 December 1948, it had grown into a massive organisation with a membership reaching 3 million. The Korean Youth Association trained its members, appointed them as reserve officers, and operated under a dual system comprising both the regular military and the youth organisation. Subsequently, following the 1949 disbandment of the National Defence Army, South Korea's reserve military force, the Korean Youth Association was reorganised into the Youth Defence Corps and utilised as a reserve military organisation. Later, during the Korean War, the Youth Defence Corps served as the foundation for the establishment of the National Defence Corps.

== Historical election results ==
=== Historical general election results ===
Year	Election	National Assembly members	Elected candidates (constituency elected/candidates)	Votes	Vote share
1948	1st general election	200	1/4	7,016	0.1%
1950	2nd general election	210	10	227,539	3.3%

=== Historical local election results ===
Year	Election	Provincial council members elected		City council members elected		Township council members elected		Township council members elected	
Year	Election	Number elected	Election rate	Number elected	Election rate	Number elected	Election rate	Number elected	Election rate
1952	1952 local election	34/306	11.1%	40/378	10.6%	229/1115	20.5%	2574/16051	16%

== See also ==
- Syngman Rhee
- Shin Song-mo
- Kim Du-han
- Daedong Youth League
- North-West Youth Association
- Korean National Youth Association
