= Daedong Youth League =

Youth organisation in South Korea, 1947–1950

- Successor: Korean Youth Association
- Formation: 21 September 1947
- Dissolved: c. 1950

The Daedong Youth League (Korean: 대동청년단; Hanja: 大同靑年團) was an anti-communist right wing youth organisation founded on 21 September 1947, centred around Ji Cheong-cheon. This organisation was integrated with the North-West Youth Association into the Korean Youth Association, which was organised on 19 December 1948 and became its central force.

== History ==
In April 1947, Ji Cheong-cheon, the Commander in Chief of the Korean Liberation Army, returned to Korea and integrated 32 right-wing organisations under the banner of "Great Unity Youth League". Subsequently, a struggle for hegemony arose among right-wing groups. Later, the faction consolidation, led by Seonu Gi-seong, broke away from the Northwest Youth League and joined the Great Unity Youth League, while the faction advocating for reconstruction, led by Mun Bong-je, served as Syngman Rhee's personal guard. The Great Unity Youth League was composed primarily of supporters of Kim Gu, and groups supporting Syngman Rhee formed the General Federation of National Salvation Youth on 5 February 1948, to counter the Great Unity Youth League.

At the right-wing camp split between Syngman Rhee, who advocated for anti-communism and the establishment of a separate government, and Kim Ku, who advocated for national unification and inter-Korean negotiations, Ji Cheong-cheon mainly aligned his activities with Syngman Rhee's line. When the Daedong Youth League actively participated in the 10 May general election and the establishment of a separate government, some members who opposed this joined Kim Kyu-sik's National Independence League on 31 July 1948, and formed the Independent Unification Youth Corps.

At the establishment of the government in 1948, Syngman Rhee organised the Daehan Youth League, another unified youth movement organisation, for the political purpose of securing his support base. Consequently the Daedong Youth Corps was also integrated and absorbed into the Daehan Youth League by presidential order, became its central force. The exact timing of its dissolution is unclear, and some members continued to operate independently even after being absorbed into the Daehan Youth League, with testimonies emerging regarding their activities in Geochang, South Gyeongsang Province. There are also testimonies that they intervened in the 1950 general election.

== Election results ==
| Year | Election | Constituency | Elected / candidate | Votes | Vote share |
|---|---|---|---|---|---|
| 1948 | 1st general election | 200 | 9/66 | 494,813 | 7.27% |

== See also ==
- Ji Cheong-cheon
- Lee Beom-seok
- North-West Youth Association
- Korean National Youth Association
- Korean Youth Association

== Reference materials ==
- "The Organization and Activities of the Daedong Youth Corps", History and Reality, March 1999, by Kim Su-ja (History Criticism Press, 1999)
- "History of the Korean Youth Movement", by Seon-u Gi-seong (Geummunsa, 1973)
- "A Stroll Through Modern Korean History", 1940s Volume 2, by Kang Jun-man (Inmul and Sasangsa, 2004)
