= List of members of the South Korean Constituent Assembly =

The members of the Constituent National Assembly, the 1st National Assembly, of South Korea were elected on 10 May 1948. The assembly sat from 31 May 1948 until 30 May 1950.

== Members ==
| Province/City | Constituency | Member | Party | |
| Province/City | Constituency | Member | At election | At term's end |
|---|---|---|---|---|
| Seoul | Jung | Yun Chi-young | KDP | KNP |
| Seoul | Jongno A | Yi Yun-yong | Democratic | Democratic |
| Seoul | Jongno B | Chang Myon (Note: Chang Myon resigned on 22 February 1949, upon being appointed as ambassador of South Korea to the United States.) | Independent | Independent |
| Seoul | Jongno B | Lee In (Note: Lee In was by-elected on 31 March 1949, to succeed Chang Myon.) | Independent | KNP |
| Seoul | Dongdaemun A | Syngman Rhee (Note: Syngman Rhee resigned on 24 July 1948, upon being elected as President of South Korea.) | NA | NA |
| Seoul | Dongdaemun A | Hong Seong-ha (Note: Hong Seong-ha was by-elected on 31 October 1948, to succeed Syngman Rhee.) | KDP | DNP |
| Seoul | Dongdaemun B | Lee Yeong-jun | KDP | DNP |
| Seoul | Seongdong | Ji Cheong-cheon | DYC | DNP |
| Seoul | Seodaemun | Kim Do-yeon | KDP | KDP |
| Seoul | Mapo | Kim Sang-don | Independent | DNP |
| Seoul | Yongsan | Kim Dong-won | KDP | KDP |
| Seoul | Yeongdeungpo | Yun Jae-uk | DYC | DNP |
| Gyeonggi Province | Incheon A | Kwak Sang-hun | Independent | Independent |
| Gyeonggi Province | Incheon B | Cho Bong-am | Independent | KNP |
| Gyeonggi Province | Gaeseong | Lee Seong-deuk | Independent | Ilmin |
| Gyeonggi Province | Goyang A | Seo Seong-dal | NA | KNP |
| Gyeonggi Province | Goyang B | Choi Guk-hyeon | Independent | DNP |
| Gyeonggi Province | Gwangju | Sin Ik-hui | NA | DNP |
| Gyeonggi Province | Yangju A | Kim Deok-yeol | Independent | KNP |
| Gyeonggi Province | Yangju B | Lee Jin-su | Independent | KNP |
| Gyeonggi Province | Pocheon | Seo Jeong-hui | KDP | DNP |
| Gyeonggi Province | Siheung | Lee Jae-hyeong | Independent | KNP |
| Gyeonggi Province | Bucheon | Lee Yu-seon | NA | KNP |
| Gyeonggi Province | Gimpo | Jeong Jun | Independent | Independent |
| Gyeonggi Province | Ganghwa | Yun Jae-geun | Independent | Independent |
| Gyeonggi Province | Paju | Kim Ung-gwon | Independent | KNP |
| Gyeonggi Province | Jangdan | Jo Jung-hyeon | Independent | DNP |
| Gyeonggi Province | Gaepung | Shin Gwang-gyun | NA | Ilmin |
| Gyeonggi Province | Yeonbaek A | Kim Gyeong-bae | Independent | KNP |
| Gyeonggi Province | Yeonbaek B | Shin Hyeon-mo | KDP | DNP |
| Gyeonggi Province | Gapyeong | Hong Ik-pyo | Independent | Independent |
| Gyeonggi Province | Yangpyeong | Ryu Rae-wan | Independent | KNP |
| Gyeonggi Province | Yeoju | Won Yong-han | DYC | Ilmin |
| Gyeonggi Province | Icheon | Song Chang-sik | NA | KNP |
| Gyeonggi Province | Yongin | Min Gyeong-sik | NA | Independent |
| Gyeonggi Province | Anseong | Kim Yeong-gi | NA | KNP |
| Gyeonggi Province | Pyeongtaek | Choi Seok-hwa | Independent | DNP |
| Gyeonggi Province | Suwon A | Hong Gil-seon | DYC | DNP |
| Gyeonggi Province | Suwon B | Kim Ung-jin | Independent | KNP |
| Gyeonggi Province | Ongjin A | O Taek-gwan | KIP | KNP |
| Gyeonggi Province | Ongjin B | Kim In-sik | DYC | Independent |
| Gangwon Province | Chunjeon | Choi Gyu-ok (Note: Choi Gyu-ok resigned on 21 December 1949, upon being appointed as Governor of Gangwon Province.) | NA | Ilmin |
| Gangwon Province | Chunseong | Lee Jong-sun | NA | KNP |
| Gangwon Province | Hongcheon | Lee Jae-hak | Independent | DNP |
| Gangwon Province | Hoengseong | Won Yong-gyun | NA | KNP |
| Gangwon Province | Wonju | Hong Beom-hui | Independent | KNP |
| Gangwon Province | Yeongwol | Jang Gi-yeong | Independent | DNP |
| Gangwon Province | Pyeongchang | Hwang Ho-hyeon | NA | KNP |
| Gangwon Province | Jeongseon | Choi Tae-gyu (Note: Choi Tae-gyu was removed on 10 February 1950.) | Independent | Independent |
| Gangwon Province | Gangneung A | Won Jang-gil | DYC | DNP |
| Gangwon Province | Gangneung B | Choi Heon-gil | NA | DNP |
| Gangwon Province | Samcheok | Kim Jin-gu | NA | Independent |
| Gangwon Province | Uljin | Kim Gwang-jun | Independent | Independent |
| North Chungcheong Province | Cheongju | Park Gi-un | Independent | KNP |
| North Chungcheong Province | Cheongwon A | Hong Sun-ok | Independent | KNP |
| North Chungcheong Province | Cheongwon B | Lee Man-geun | Independent | DNP |
| North Chungcheong Province | Boeun | Kim Gyo-hyeon | Independent | DNP |
| North Chungcheong Province | Okcheon | Jeong Gu-sam | NA | Ilmin |
| North Chungcheong Province | Yeongdong | Park U-gyeong | Independent | KNP |
| North Chungcheong Province | Jincheon | Song Pil-man | KDP | DNP |
| North Chungcheong Province | Gwisan | Yeon Byeong-ho | Independent | KNP |
| North Chungcheong Province | Eumseong | Lee Ui-sang | NA | KNP |
| North Chungcheong Province | Chungju | Kim Gi-cheol | DYC | Independent |
| North Chungcheong Province | Jecheon | Ryu Hong-yeol | Independent | KNP |
| North Chungcheong Province | Danyang | Jo Jong-seung | Independent | KNP |
| South Chungcheong Province | Daejeon | Seong Nak-seo | NA | Independent |
| South Chungcheong Province | Daedeok | Song Jin-baek | NA | KNP |
| South Chungcheong Province | Yeongi | Jin Heon-sik | NA | KNP |
| South Chungcheong Province | Gongju A | Kim Myeong-dong | Independent | KNP |
| South Chungcheong Province | Gongju B | Shin Bang-hyeon | Independent | Independent |
| South Chungcheong Province | Nonsan A | Yu Jin-hong | NA | DNP |
| South Chungcheong Province | Nonsan B | Choi Un-gyo | Independent | KNP |
| South Chungcheong Province | Buyeo A | Namgung Hyeon | NA | KNP |
| South Chungcheong Province | Buyeo B | Kim Cheol-su | NA | Ilmin |
| South Chungcheong Province | Seocheon | Lee Hun-gu | Independent | KWFP |
| South Chungcheong Province | Boryeong | Im Seok-gyu | DYC | DNP |
| South Chungcheong Province | Cheongyang | Lee Jong-geun | NA | KNP |
| South Chungcheong Province | Hongseong | Son Jae-hak | NA | Independent |
| South Chungcheong Province | Yesan | Yun Byeong-gu | Independent | KNP |
| South Chungcheong Province | Seosan A | Lee Jong-rin | Independent | Ilmin |
| South Chungcheong Province | Seosan B | Kim Dong-jun | Independent | KNP |
| South Chungcheong Province | Dangjin | Kim Yong-jae | NA | KNP |
| South Chungcheong Province | Asan | Seo Yong-gil (Note: Seo Yong-gil was removed in 1949.) | Independent | Independent |
| South Chungcheong Province | Cheonan | Lee Byeong-guk (Note: Lee Byeong-guk died on 8 April 1949.) | NA | NA |
| South Chungcheong Province | Cheonan | Kim Yong-hwa (Note: Kim Yong-hwa was by-elected on 10 June 1949, to succeed Lee Byeong-guk, but his election was invalidation on 23 June 1949.) | Independent | Independent |
| South Chungcheong Province | Cheonan | Lee Sang-don (Note: Lee Sang-don was by-elected on 23 July 1949, to succeed Kim Yong-hwa.) | DNP | DNP |
| North Jeolla Province | Jeonju | Shin Seong-gyun (Note: Shin Seong-gyun was removed in 1949.) | Independent | Independent |
| North Jeolla Province | Gunsan | Yun Seok-gu | Independent | KNP |
| North Jeolla Province | Iri | Bae Heon | Independent | KNP |
| North Jeolla Province | Jeongeup A | Na Yong-gyun | KDP | DNP |
| North Jeolla Province | Jeongeup B | Kim Jong-mun | KDP | DNP |
| North Jeolla Province | Gochang A | Kim Yeong-dong | Independent | KNP |
| North Jeolla Province | Gochang B | Baek Gwan-su | KDP | DNP |
| North Jeolla Province | Buan | Jo Jae-myeon | NA | Independent |
| North Jeolla Province | Iksan A | Baek Hyeong-nam | DYC | KNP |
| North Jeolla Province | Iksan B | Lee Mun-won (Note: Lee Mun-won was removed on 10 February 1950.) | Independent | Independent |
| North Jeolla Province | Gimje A | Jo Han-baek | Independent | DNP |
| North Jeolla Province | Gimje B | Hong Hui-jong | KNYA | DNP |
| North Jeolla Province | Okgu | Lee Yo-han | NA | KNP |
| North Jeolla Province | Wanju A | Ryu Jun-sang | NA | KNP |
| North Jeolla Province | Wanju B | Lee Seok-ju | FF | DNP |
| North Jeolla Province | Jinan | O Gi-yeol | Independent | Independent |
| North Jeolla Province | Geumsan | Jeong Hae-jun | NA | DNP |
| North Jeolla Province | Muju | Shin Hyeon-don (Note: Shin Hyeon-don resigned on 19 October 1948, upon being appointed as Governor of North Jeolla Province.) | NA | KNP |
| North Jeolla Province | Muju | Kim Gyo-jung (Note: Kim Gyo-jung was by-elected on 13 January 1949, to succeed Shin Hyeon-don.) | DYC | Independent |
| North Jeolla Province | Jangsu | Kim Bong-du | Independent | Independent |
| North Jeolla Province | Imsil | Jin Jik-hyeon | NA | DNP |
| North Jeolla Province | Namwon | Lee Jeong-gi | KNYA | DNP |
| North Jeolla Province | Sunchang | No Il-hwan (Note: No Ik-hwan was removed on 10 February 1950.) | KDP | KDP |
| South Jeolla Province | Gwangju | Jeong Gwang-ho | KDP | DNP |
| South Jeolla Province | Mokpo | Lee Nam-gyu (Note: Lee Nam-gyu resigned on 19 October 1948, upon being appointed as Governor of South Jeolla Province.) | NA | NA |
| South Jeolla Province | Mokpo | Kang Seon-myeong (Note: Kang Seon-myeong was by-elected on 12 January 1949, to succeed Lee Nam-gyu.) | Independent | KNP |
| South Jeolla Province | Gwangsan | Park Jong-nam | Independent | Independent |
| South Jeolla Province | Damyang | Jeong Gyun-sik | KNYA | DNP |
| South Jeolla Province | Gokseong | Seo U-seok | KDP | DNP |
| South Jeolla Province | Gurye | Kim Jong-seon | KDP | DNP |
| South Jeolla Province | Gwangyang | Kim Ok-ju (Note: Kim Ok-ju was removed on 10 February 1950.) | Independent | Independent |
| South Jeolla Province | Yeosu A | Kim Mun-pyeong | NA | DNP |
| South Jeolla Province | Yeosu B | Hwang Byeong-gyu | Independent | KNP |
| South Jeolla Province | Suncheon A | Hwang Du-yeon | FF | NA |
| South Jeolla Province | Suncheon B | Jo Ok-hyeon | NA | KNP |
| South Jeolla Province | Goheung A | O Seok-ju | NA | KNP |
| South Jeolla Province | Goheung B | Ryu Seong-gap | Danmin | Independent |
| South Jeolla Province | Boseong | Lee Jeong-rae | KDP | DNP |
| South Jeolla Province | Hwasun | Jo Guk-hyeon | Daeseonghoe | DNP |
| South Jeolla Province | Jangheung | Kim Jung-gi | Independent | Independent |
| South Jeolla Province | Gangjin | Cha Gyeong-mo | Independent | KNP |
| South Jeolla Province | Haenam A | Song Bong-hae | NA | KNP |
| South Jeolla Province | Haenam B | Lee Seong-hak | DYC | Ilmin |
| South Jeolla Province | Yeongam | Kim Chun-yon | KDP | DNP |
| South Jeolla Province | Muan A | Kim Yong-hyeon | KDP | DNP |
| South Jeolla Province | Muan B | Jang Hong-yeom | KDP | DNP |
| South Jeolla Province | Naju A | Lee Hang-bal | Independent | Independent |
| South Jeolla Province | Naju B | Kim Sang-ho | KDP | DNP |
| South Jeolla Province | Hampyeong | Lee Seong-u | Independent | KNP |
| South Jeolla Province | Yeonggwang | Jo Yeong-gyu | KDP | DNP |
| South Jeolla Province | Jangseong | Kim Sang-sun | KDP | DNP |
| South Jeolla Province | Wando | Kim Jang-yeol | Independent | KNP |
| South Jeolla Province | Jindo | Kim Byeong-hoe (Note: Kim Byeong-hoe was removed on 10 February 1950.) | Independent | Independent |
| North Gyeongsang Province | Daegu A | Choi Yun-dong | KDP | DNP |
| North Gyeongsang Province | Daegu B | Seo Sang-il | KDP | DNP |
| North Gyeongsang Province | Daegu C | Baek Nam-chae | KDP | DNP |
| North Gyeongsang Province | Dalseong | Kim U-sik | Jeondohoe | Ilmin |
| North Gyeongsang Province | Gunwi | Park Jun | Independent | KNP |
| North Gyeongsang Province | Uisang A | Jeong U-il | Independent | KNP |
| North Gyeongsang Province | Uisang B | Kwon Byeong-no | NA | Ilmin |
| North Gyeongsang Province | Andong A | Kim Ik-gi | NA | DNP |
| North Gyeongsang Province | Andong B | Jeong Hyeon-mo (Note: Jeong Hyeon-mo resigned on 19 October 1948, upon being appointed as Governor of North Gyeongsang Province.) | Independent | Independent |
| North Gyeongsang Province | Andong B | Louise Yim (Note: Louise Yim was by-elected on 13 January 1949, to succeed Jeong Hyeon-mo.) | KWNP | KNP |
| North Gyeongsang Province | Cheongsong | Kim Bong-jo | EA | Independent |
| North Gyeongsang Province | Yeongyang | Jo Heon-yeong | KDP | Independent |
| North Gyeongsang Province | Yeongdok | O Taek-yeol | NA | NA |
| North Gyeongsang Province | Yeongil A | Park Sun-seok | Independent | Independent |
| North Gyeongsang Province | Yeongil B | Kim Ik-no | Independent | Independent |
| North Gyeongsang Province | Gyeongju A | Kim Cheol | NA | Ilmin |
| North Gyeongsang Province | Gyeongju B | Lee Seok | NA | Ilmin |
| North Gyeongsang Province | Yeongcheon A | Jeong Do-yeong | NA | DNP |
| North Gyeongsang Province | Yeongcheon B | Lee Beom-gyo | NA | Independent |
| North Gyeongsang Province | Gyeongsan | Park Hae-jeong | Independent | Independent |
| North Gyeongsang Province | Cheongdo | Park Jong-hwan | NA | DNP |
| North Gyeongsang Province | Goryeong | Kim Sang-deok | NUH | DNP |
| North Gyeongsang Province | Seongju | Lee Ho-seok | Independent | Ilmin |
| North Gyeongsang Province | Chilgok | Jang Byeong-man | NA | KNP |
| North Gyeongsang Province | Gimcheon A | Kwon Tae-hui | Independent | Ilmin |
| North Gyeongsang Province | Gimcheon B | Lee Byeong-gwan | Independent | DNP |
| North Gyeongsang Province | Seonsan | Yuk Hong-gyun | NA | KNP |
| North Gyeongsang Province | Sangju A | Han Am-hoe | NA | Ilmin |
| North Gyeongsang Province | Sangju B | Jeon Jin-han | KFTU | KFTU |
| North Gyeongsang Province | Mungyeong | Jo Byeong-han | Independent | Ilmin |
| North Gyeongsang Province | Yecheon | Park Sang-yeong | KDP | Ilmin |
| North Gyeongsang Province | Yeongju | Choi Seok-hong | DYC | DNP |
| North Gyeongsang Province | Bonghwa | Bae Jung-hyeok (Note: Bae Jung-hyeok was removed on 10 February 1950.) | Independent | DNP |
| North Gyeongsang Province | Ulleung | Seo I-hwan | Independent | Ilmin |
| South Gyeongsang Province | Busan A | Mun Si-hwan (Note: Mun Si-hwan resigned on 19 October 1948, upon being appointed as Governor of South Gyeongsang Province.) | KNYA | KNYA |
| South Gyeongsang Province | Busan A | Heo Young-ho (Note: Heo Young-ho was by-elected on 14 January 1949, to succeed Mun Si-hwan.) | Independent | KNP |
| South Gyeongsang Province | Busan B | Ho Chong | KDP | DNP |
| South Gyeongsang Province | Busan C | Han Seok-beom | KDP | DNP |
| South Gyeongsang Province | Busan D | Park Chan-hyeon | Independent | Independent |
| South Gyeongsang Province | Masan | Kwon Tae-uk | Independent | Independent |
| South Gyeongsang Province | Jinju | Lee Kang-u | Independent | Independent |
| South Gyeongsang Province | Jinyang | Hwang Yun-ho (Note: Hwang Yun-ho was removed in 1950.) | Independent | Independent |
| South Gyeongsang Province | Uiryeong | Ahn Jun-sang | KNYA | Ilmin |
| South Gyeongsang Province | Haman | Kang Uk-jung (Note: Kang Uk-jung was removed on 10 February 1950.) | KNYA | KNYA |
| South Gyeongsang Province | Changnyeong | Ku Jung-hoe | Independent | Ilmin |
| South Gyeongsang Province | Milyang A | Lee Ju-hyeong | NA | Ilmin |
| South Gyeongsang Province | Milyang B | Park Hae-geuk | Independent | DNP |
| South Gyeongsang Province | Yangsan | Jeong Jin-geun | Independent | Independent |
| South Gyeongsang Province | Ulsan A | Choi Bong-sik | Independent | DNP |
| South Gyeongsang Province | Ulsan B | Kim Su-seon | Independent | Independent |
| South Gyeongsang Province | Dongnae | Kim Yak-su (Note: Kim Yak-su was removed on 10 February 1950.) | KRP | KRP |
| South Gyeongsang Province | Gimhae A | Shin Sang-hak | Independent | NA |
| South Gyeongsang Province | Gimhae B | Jo Gyu-gap | Independent | Independent |
| South Gyeongsang Province | Changwon A | Kim Tae-su | NA | Independent |
| South Gyeongsang Province | Changwon B | Ju Gi-yong | Independent | Ilmin |
| South Gyeongsang Province | Tongyeong A | Kim Jae-hak | KDP | DNP |
| South Gyeongsang Province | Tongyeong B | Seo Sun-yeong | Independent | Independent |
| South Gyeongsang Province | Goseong | Lee Gu-su (Note: Lee Gu-su was removed on 10 February 1950.) | Independent | Independent |
| South Gyeongsang Province | Sacheon | Choi Beom-sul | Independent | KNP |
| South Gyeongsang Province | Namhae | Park Yun-won (Note: Park Yun-won was removed on 10 February 1950.) | Independent | Independent |
| South Gyeongsang Province | Hadong | Kang Dal-su | Busan 15 | Ilmin |
| South Gyeongsang Province | Sancheong | Kang Gi-mun | Independent | KNP |
| South Gyeongsang Province | Hamyang | Kim Gyeong-do | NA | Ilmin |
| South Gyeongsang Province | Geochang | Pyo Hyeon-tae | NA | Ilmin |
| South Gyeongsang Province | Hapcheon A | Lee Won-hong | NA | DNP |
| South Gyeongsang Province | Hapcheon B | Kim Hyo-seok (Note: Kim Hyo-seok resigned on 5 January 1949, upon being appointed as Minister of Home Affairs.) | NA | NA |
| South Gyeongsang Province | Hapcheon B | Choi Chang-seop (Note: Choi Chang-seop was by-elected on 30 March 1949, to succeed Kim Hyo-seok.) | Independent | KNP |
| Jeju Province | Bukjeju A | Hong Sun-nyeong (Note: Hong Sun-nyeong was by-elected on 10 May 1949, to fill a vacancy caused by the invalidation of the 1948 election in Bukjeju A, Jeju Province, but died on 23 December 1949.) | NA | DNP |
| Jeju Province | Bukjeju B | Yang Byeong-jik (Note: Yang Byeong-jik was by-elected on 10 May 1949, to fill a vacancy caused by the invalidation of the 1948 election in Bukjeju B, Jeju Province.) | KYA | KNP |
| Jeju Province | Namjeju | O Yong-guk | Independent | DNP |

== See also ==
- 1948 South Korean Constitutional Assembly election
- 1946 North Korean local elections
- 1947 North Korean local elections
- South Korea
- National Assembly (South Korea)#History
