= Kim Sang-ho =

- Hangul: 김상호
- RR: Gim Sangho
- MR: Kim Sangho

Kim Sang-ho may refer to:

- Kim Sang-ho (actor) (born 1970), South Korean actor
- Kim Sang-ho (politician) (1901–1982), South Korean politician, see List of members of the South Korean Constituent Assembly, 1948–1950
- Kim Sang-ho (footballer) (born 1964)
- Kim Sang-ho (baseball) (born 1989), South Korean baseball player
