= March 1960 South Korean presidential election =

- 15 March 1960
- Presidential election
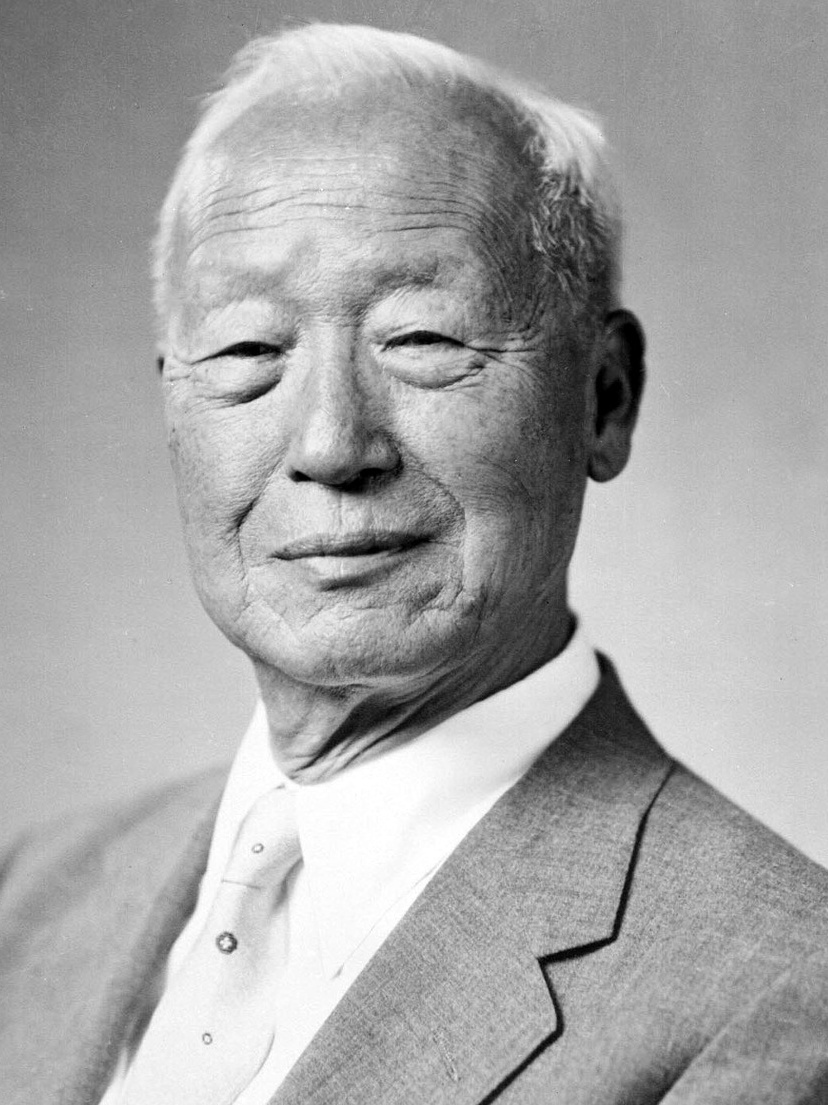
Candidate	Syngman Rhee
Party	Liberal
Popular vote	9,633,376
Percentage	100%
President before election
Syngman Rhee
Liberal
Elected President
Election results annulled
Ho Chong named
Acting President
- Vice presidential election
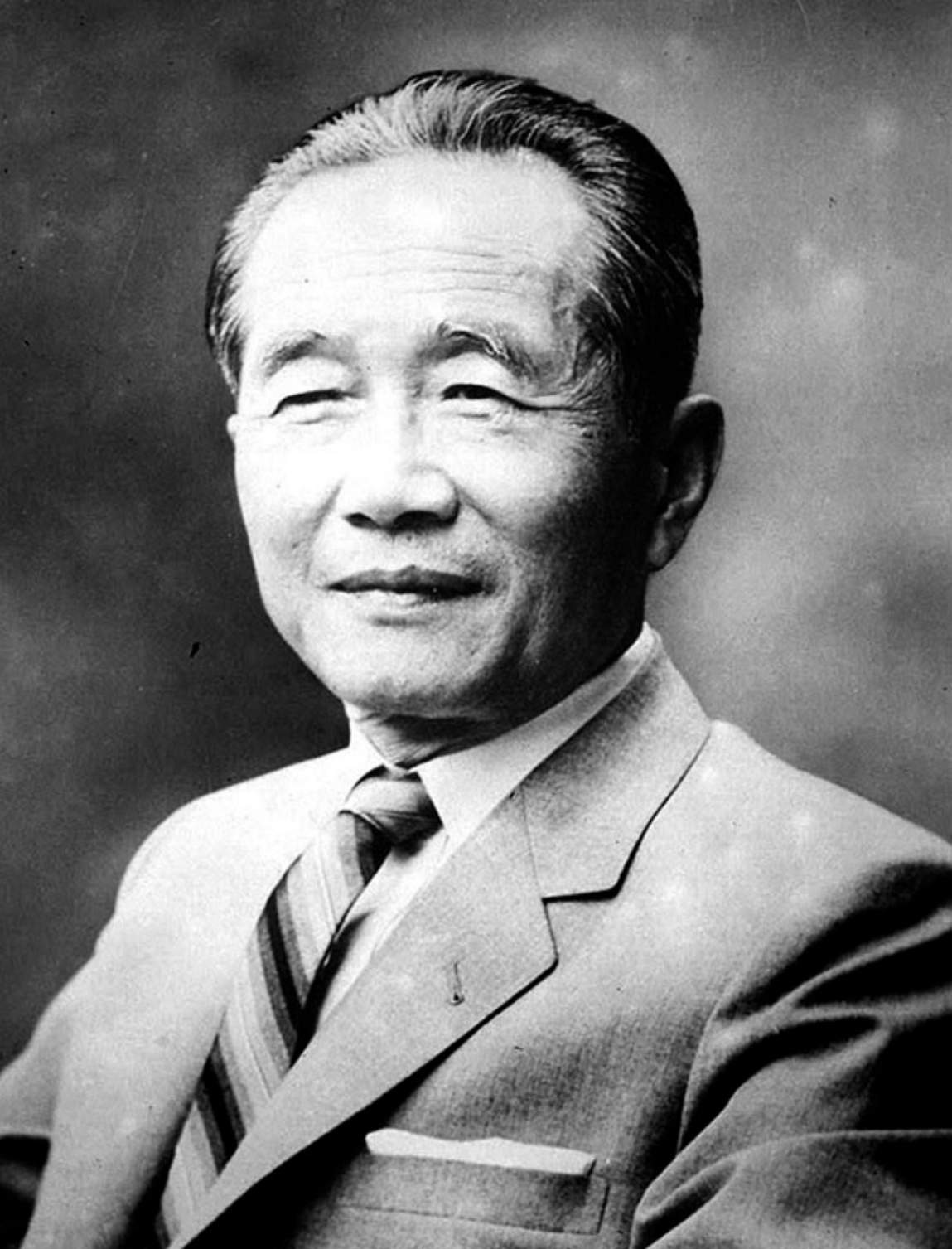

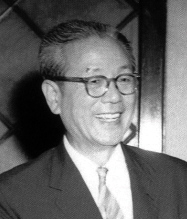
Candidate	Lee Ki Poong	Chang Myon
Party	Liberal	Democratic
Popular vote	8,337,059	1,843,758
Percentage	79.19%	17.51%
Vice president before election
Chang Myon
Democratic
Elected Vice president
Election results annulled
Position abolished

Presidential and vice presidential elections were held in South Korea on 15 March 1960. Shortly after winning reelection to a second term in the 1952 presidential election, Rhee had the legislature pass a constitutional amendment exempting himself from the two-term limit, allowing himself to run for and win a third term in 1956 and in March 1960.

After the death of Democratic Party opponent Cho Pyong-ok, Rhee was left as the only candidate, and was re-elected unopposed. Voter turnout was 97.0%. With the lack of a meaningful contest in the presidential race, popular focus shifted to the vice presidential contest where Rhee's Liberal Party candidate Lee Ki-poong competed against Chang Myon. The elections were heavily rigged in Lee's favor, and widespread allegations of corruption and manipulation of the results sparked protests which spiralled into the April Revolution, causing the annulment of the election, the resignation and exile of Rhee, and the collapse of the First Republic. The election is described by the Encyclopedia of Korean Culture as the "March 15 Election Fraud."

== Results ==
=== President ===
Popular hopes of unseating Rhee were frustrated by the death of his opponent Cho Pyong-ok several weeks before the election, leaving Rhee to be elected without opposition.

The constitution stated, if there was only one candidate, they were required to receive at least 30% of the total votes cast in order to be elected, including blank and invalid votes. As the only candidate, Rhee received 88.7% of all votes cast. Dissent to the authoritarian president was more apparent in the urban areas than the rest of the country. In Seoul, nearly a third of the votes were invalid or blank, while in the vice presidential election held simultaneously, only 2.9% of the ballots were invalidated.

Candidate	Party	Votes	%
Syngman Rhee	Liberal Party	9,633,376	100.00
Total		9,633,376	100.00
Valid votes		9,633,376	88.69
Invalid/blank votes		1,228,896	11.31
Total votes		10,862,272	100.00
Registered voters/turnout		11,196,490	97.01
Source: Nohlen et al.

==== By province and city ====
Province/City	Syngman Rhee		Invalid	
Province/City	Votes	%	Votes	%
Seoul	684,146	72.14	264,193	27.86
Gyeonggi	1,139,927	87.13	168,401	12.87
Gangwon	829,131	94.89	44,665	5.11
North Chungcheong	510,369	88.54	66,068	11.46
South Chungcheong	988,180	93.48	68,952	6.52
North Jeolla	919,529	89.00	113,640	11.00
South Jeolla	1,398,887	92.78	108,902	7.22
North Gyeongsang	1,403,461	87.36	203,105	12.64
South Gyeongsang	1,632,159	89.57	190,158	10.43
Jeju	127,587	99.37	812	0.63
Total	9,633,376	88.69	1,228,896	11.31
Source: National Election Commission

=== Vice president ===
With no competition for Rhee in the presidential elections of 1960 after the death of his opponent, the simultaneous vice presidential elections became the main focus of attention. Opposition to Rhee was concentrated around the incumbent Democratic Party candidate, Chang Myon, who had been elected in 1956. Official results after the election showed a large victory for the Liberal candidate, Lee Ki Poong, with a margin of almost 80% to Chang's 17.5%, entirely against popular expectations, and it was obvious that the results had been extensively manipulated: Han goes so far as to say that "the election results were completely fabricated by police headquarters and the ministry of internal affairs".

The Democratic Party rejected the result and on the same day, protests began in Masan against the fabrication of the election results. The discovery of the mutilated body of a sixteen-year-old boy who had participated in these protests in early April caused a wave of further protest, and Rhee's obdurate attitude led to the intensification of unrest into the April Revolution, though Rhee forced Lee to withdraw from active politics. The results of the elections were nullified after the Revolution's triumph later in the year, though Chang himself resigned on April 23.

Candidate	Party	Votes	%
Lee Ki-poong	Liberal Party	8,337,059	79.19
Chang Myon	Democratic Party	1,843,758	17.51
Kim Chun-yon	Unification Party	249,095	2.37
Louise Yim	National Association	97,533	0.93
Total		10,527,445	100.00

==== By province and city ====
Province/City	Lee Ki-poong		Chang Myon		Kim Chun-yon		Louise Yim	
Province/City	Votes	%	Votes	%	Votes	%	Votes	%
Seoul	509,693	55.34	378,399	41.09	20,154	2.19	12,704	1.38
Gyeonggi	955,804	75.64	278,686	22.05	20,372	1.61	8,771	0.69
Gangwon	786,595	91.64	64,743	7.54	5,468	0.64	1,543	0.18
North Chungcheong	437,883	78.64	98,583	17.70	15,196	2.73	5,165	0.93
South Chungcheong	884,856	84.74	140,567	13.46	12,488	1.20	6,327	0.61
North Jeolla	851,878	85.47	89,846	9.01	32,176	3.23	22,799	2.29
South Jeolla	1,218,247	83.84	140,664	9.68	80,491	5.54	13,612	0.94
North Gyeongsang	1,166,341	75.46	340,214	22.01	27,759	1.80	11,286	0.73
South Gyeongsang	1,398,637	79.46	311,320	17.69	34,869	1.98	15,284	0.87
Jeju	127,125	99.30	736	0.57	122	0.10	42	0.03
Total	8,337,059	79.19	1,843,758	17.51	249,095	2.37	97,533	0.93
