= Korean Women's National Party =

1945–1961 political party in South Korea

- Leader: Im Young-shin
- Founded: September 18, 1945
- Dissolved: May 16, 1961
- Ideology: Feminism; Conservativism; Factions: pro-Syngman Rhee
- Political position: Right-wing
- Colors: Brown

Korean name
- Hangul: 대한여자국민당
- RR: Daehan yeoja gungmindang
- MR: Taehan yŏja kungmindang

The Korean Women's National Party (Korean: 대한여자국민당) was a woman-led, right wing political party established on 18 September 1945. Known simply as the Nationalist Party, it was the first political party for women in Korea; originally founded as the Joseon Women's Nationalist Party, it was renamed the Korean Women's National Party in 1948 after the official name of the state was confirmed as the Republic of Korea. The party was founded through the initiative of figures such as Im Young-shin, Lee Eun-hye, Kim Seon and Hwang Hyun-sook, and it entered the legislature after Im was elected as a member of the National Assembly for two consecutive terms.

== Outline ==
Its platform included "building a democratic society not composed solely of men," "establishing a democratic economy that improves the lives of workers and women," and "contributing to world and human peace through the advancement of national culture." The leadership consisted of Party leader Im Young-shim, Deputy Leaders Lee Eun-hye and Kim Seon, and Secretary-General Park Hyun-sook, among others, and the party maintained seven executive departments. In practice, however, rather than focusing on women's affairs, the party operated as a pro-Syngman Rhee faction, driven by Im Young-shim's political leanings. The party's influence waned after Im Young-shim lost the vice-presidential election in May 1952. Struggling to maintain even a nominal existence due to member defections and pressure from the Liberal Party, it was ultimately dissolved following the May 16 coup in 1961.

== See also ==
- Im Young-shin
- Korean Women's Associations United
- Korea Nationalist Party
