= Shin Song-mo =

South Korean politician (1891–1960)

- 신성모
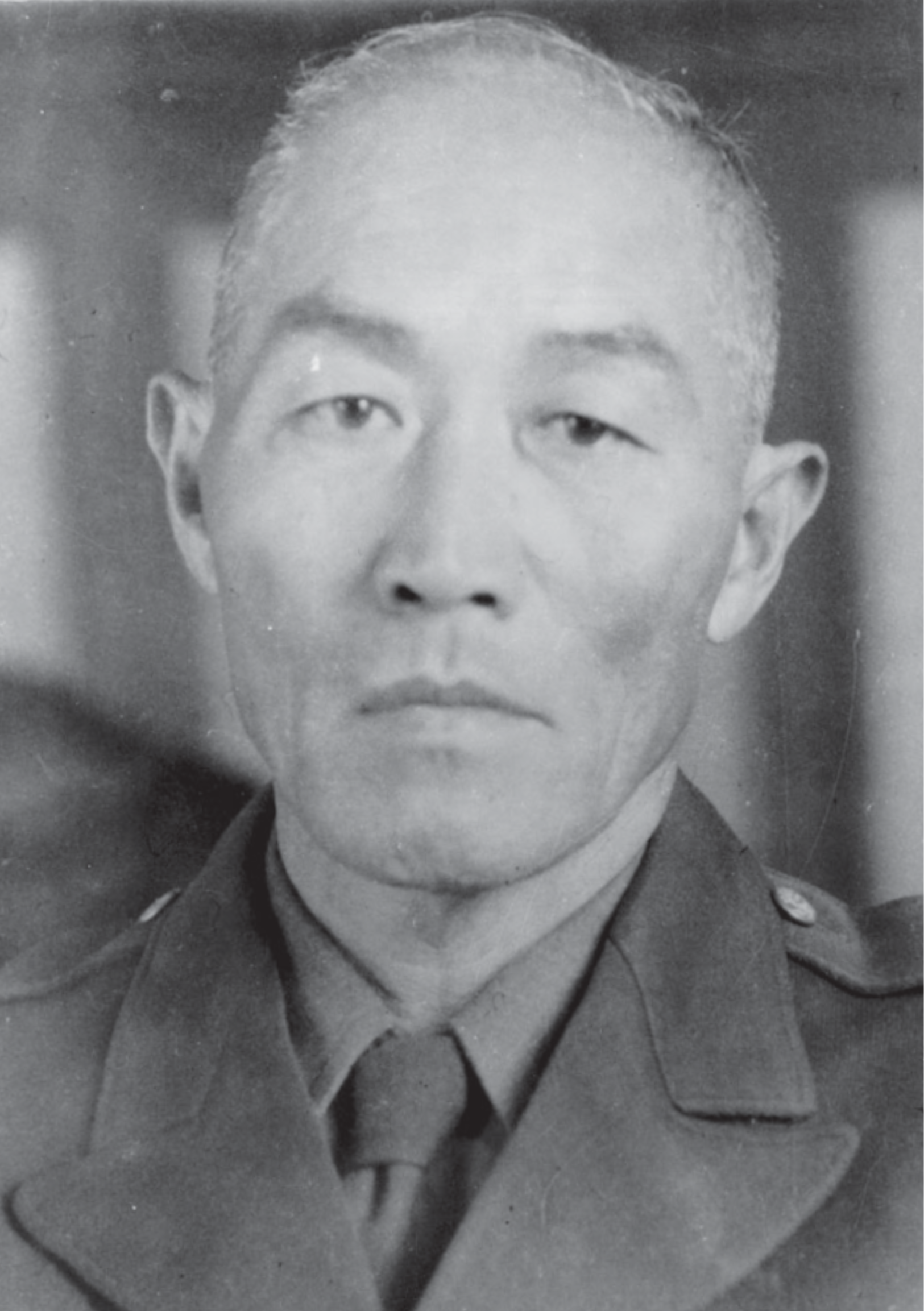

Acting Prime Minister of South Korea
- In office April 21, 1950 – November 23, 1950
- President: Syngman Rhee
- Prime Minister: Himself
- Vice President: Yi Si-yeong
- Preceded by: Lee Beom-seok
- Succeeded by: Chang Myon

2nd Minister of National Defense
- In office March 21, 1949 – May 5, 1951
- President: Syngman Rhee
- Prime Minister: Lee Beom-seok
- Vice President: Yi Si-yeong
- Preceded by: Lee Beom-seok
- Succeeded by: Lee Ki-poong

Personal details
- Born: October 20, 1891 Uiryeong, Gyeongsang Province, Joseon
- Died: May 29, 1960 (aged 68) Seoul, South Korea
- Cause of death: Cerebral hemorrhage
- Resting place: Daejeon National Cemetery

Korean name
- Hangul: 신성모
- Hanja: 申性模
- RR: Sin Seongmo
- MR: Sin Sŏngmo

Art name
- Hangul: 소창
- Hanja: 小滄
- RR: Sochang
- MR: Soch'ang

Shin Song-mo or Shin Sung-mo (Korean: 신성모; Hanja: 申性模; October 20, 1891 – May 29, 1960) was a Korean independence activist and South Korean politician. He was an acting prime minister in 1950 following the first prime minister of South Korea, Lee Beom-seok. He served as a Defence Minister during the Korean War.

== Biography ==
=== Early life ===
In 1891, he was born in Uiryeong, Gyeongsang Province, Joseon, as the son of Yi Chaerok. In 1907, he entered the night class at the Department of Law at Bosung College, and graduated from Boseong Law College in 1910 (4 years in Yonghee). In August 1910, he fled to Vladivostok and joined into the anti-Japanese independence movement under the guidance of Shin Chae-ho and his hometown leader, Ahn Hee-je.

From 1930, he became the captain of a regular ferry to and from London and India. When the Korean Liberation Army was established in September 1940, the Provisional Government of the Republic of Korea made a special appointment to him as a military commissioner. During World War II, it was known in Korea that he was surviving around May 1948 after giving up his return and taking office as an adviser to an Indian merchant ship company.

==== Political activity ====
He returned to Korea in 1948. On December 19, 1949, he was invited to the Supreme Council of the Korean Youth. After that, he served as the head of the Korea Youth Team and advisory committee of the Ministry of Transportation, in 1949 he served as the second Minister of Home Affairs (Korean: 대한민국 내무부). On March 21, 1949 he became the second Minister of Defense (Korean: 대한민국 국방부) a position he held until May 5, 1951. Syngman Rhee preferred a person who spoke English well and Shin was said to be fluent in English while studying in London.

Upon returning, he is given the title Admiral. At the time, he served as the captain of a British merchant ship, advisor and director of an Indian merchant ship, but received military training in China and was adjutant to the Chinese Navy Admiral Sal Jinbing, the Korean Provisional Government's Korean Liberation Army Being a member of the military was recognized for his career, he was given the rank of lieutenant general of the Navy, and he was called Admiral Holy Mother.

On July 17, 1949, while as Minister of National Defense, he said, "The military is waiting for orders from the President, and with orders, it can completely take over Pyongyang or Wonsan within a day." When the remarks became a problem, he explained that his remarks were misunderstood, but in early September of that year, he insisted, "I just wait for the time to come and I'm ready to push."

As Lee Beom-seok resigned from his post as prime minister, Shin was inaugurated as acting prime minister on April 21, 1950, and worked until November 22.

=== Korean War ===
Defense Minister Shin Song-mo with Deputy Minister of Defense Jang Kyung-geun, and Director Chung Il-kwon (from left), standing side by side at the Naval Headquarters after the 3rd Army Operation Agreement. Chung Il-kwon was shortly after being issued by the Commander-in-chief of the Army, Naval and Air Force.

The Korean War broke out and in the beginning of the war, at the State Council meeting held at 4:00AM on June 27, 1950, Shin Song-mo who was Minister of Defense said that he had no knowledge of the situation.

He was a member of the Provisional Government Military Committee, but unlike Lee Beom-seok, Chi Ch'ŏngch'ŏn, Kim Hong-il and others, he had no experience in direct combat with the army as he was engaged in maritime vessel-related work, communication-related, and interpretation-related work before the repatriation. As a member of the State Council of the Republic of Korea, he showed a completely different attitude from his position to take care of the safety of the people. At the time of the Korean War, he served as Chairman of the Joint Chiefs of Staff.

Regarding the Geochang massacre in 1951, he was criticized by the National Assembly that it was rationalizing the case with Kim Jong-won (Korean: 김종원), who was then martial arts commander. It was found that some of the gold was used as political funds for Syngman Rhee. At this time, Shin Song-mo resigned as Minister of National Defense while trying to avoid it. In 1951, he worked as the fifth chief executive officer of Japan.

At this time, Chough Pyung-ok who was the Minister of Home Affairs (Korean: 대한민국 내무부) and the Prime Minister's office disagreed over his appointment as the Japanese public official, and the Democratic National Party's top member, Yun Posun, also objected by mentioning his morality over the National Defense Force and Geochang massacre, but President Syngman Rhee kneels on their backlash and mocked Shin Song-mo Japan Corporation jobs were passed.

=== After the ceasefire ===
From November 28, 1956, he served as the Dean of the Maritime University. He died of a cerebral hemorrhage at Uiryeong on May 29, 1960. After being buried in Seonyeong, Yongdeok-myeon, Uiryeong-gun, South Gyeongsang Province, his remains were later transferred to the Daejeon National Cemetery.

Political offices
Preceded by Lee Beom-seok	Acting Prime Minister of South Korea; April 21, 1950 – November 23, 1950	Succeeded by Chang Myon
Preceded by Lee Beom-seok	Minister of National Defence; March 21, 1949 – May 5, 1951	Succeeded by Lee Ki-poong
