= Louise Yim =

South Korean politician (1899–1977)

Minister of Commerce and Industry
- In office 1948–1949

Member of the Constituent National Assembly
- In office 1949–1950

Member of the National Assembly
- In office 1950–1954

Personal details
- Born: 20 November 1899 Geumsan, Korean Empire
- Died: 17 February 1977 (aged 77) Seoul, South Korea

Im Yeong-sin (Korean: 임영신; 20 November 1899 – 17 February 1977), also known by the English name Louise Yim, was a South Korean educator and politician. She was both the first female minister in South Korea, holding the post of Minister of Commerce and Industry from 1948 to 1949, and the first woman elected to the South Korean parliament, serving from 1949 to 1954. Yim also helped establish Chung-Ang University.

== Biography ==
Yim was born into a wealthy family of farmers in Geumsan in 1899. She began organising anti-Japanese activities while at high school. After organising protests as part of the March First Movement in 1919, she was jailed and tortured. She subsequently attended university in the United States, earning an MA in political science and theology at the University of Southern California. Returning to Korea, she worked for the Young Women's Christian Association, before becoming head of the Chung-Ang Training School for Kindergarten Teachers.

Although the Japanese closed the school in 1944, she reopened it the following year, after which she worked to transform it into Chung-Ang University. In 1945 she also founded the Korean Women's National Party. She served as a Korean representative at the United Nations from 1946 to 1948, helping draft the resolution that granted South Korea independence. In 1948 she was appointed Minister of Commerce and Industry by President Syngman Rhee, becoming the first female minister in a South Korean government.

The following year she contested a by-election to the Constituent National Assembly in Andong, becoming the first South Korean woman elected to parliament (four women had previously been appointed members). She was re-elected to the National Assembly in 1950. In 1952 she contested the vice-presidential elections, finishing seventh in a field of nine candidates with 2.7% of the vote. In 1953 she was appointed president of Chung-Ang University, a role she held until 1961. She lost her seat in the National Assembly in 1954, but ran for the vice-presidency again in 1960, finishing last out of four candidates with less than 1% of the vote.

Yim published an autobiography, My Forty Year Fight for Korea. She died in Seoul in February 1977 at the age of 77.
