= Jeong Hyeon-mo =

South Korean politician (1894–1965)

Jeong Hyeon-mo 정현모(鄭顯模), October 10, 1894 – January 1, 1965) was a Korean politician, journalist, businessman, and independence activist.

== Education ==
- Graduate, Hyeopdong School and Bosung Middle School, Korea
- Bachelor of Arts graduate, School of Political Science and Economics at Waseda University, Japan

== Career ==
- Managing Editor, Shidae Ilbo
- President and founding board member, Shinganhoe Andong-city branch (August 1927 - 1929)
- Managing Editor, Chosun Ilbo
- Business executive
- Member of the Constituent Assembly, Republic of Korea Government (Andong-city B-district electee; May 10, 1948)
- First Governor, Gyeongsangbuk-do Government, Republic of Korea (October 8, 1948 - January 23, 1950)
- First Director of Party Affairs, Liberal Party, Republic of Korea (December 1951 - September 1952)
- Fourth Governor, Chungcheongbuk-do Government, Republic of Korea (September 1952 - November 1953)
- First Chairman of the Board, Shilla Foundation of Education, Republic of Korea (July 1954 - 1957)
- Founding member, Minwoo Party, Republic of Korea (1962)

== Awards and honors ==
Recipient of Order of Civil Merit – Mugunghwa Medal (highest honor), President of Republic of Korea Government
