= 1952 South Korean presidential election =

- 5 August 1952
- Presidential election
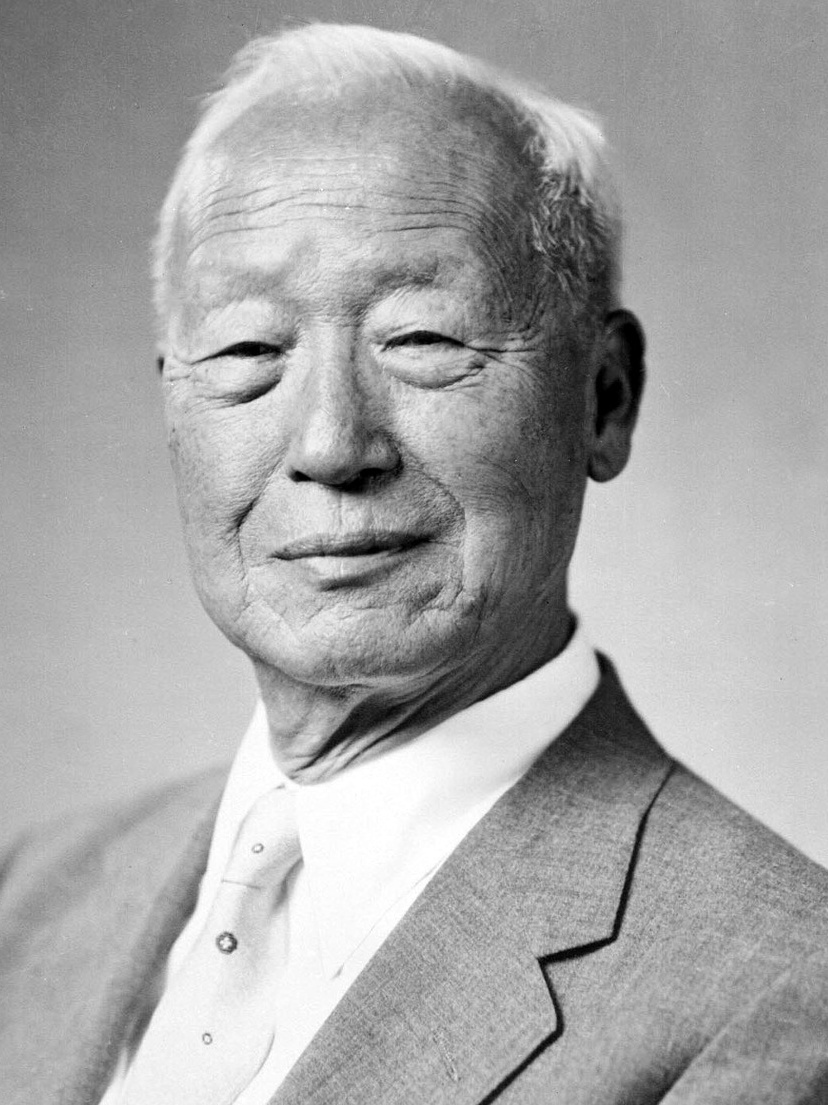

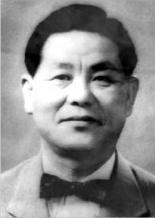

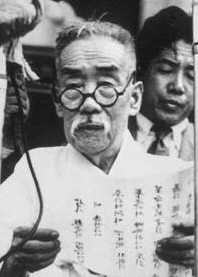
Candidate	Syngman Rhee	Cho Bong-am	Yi Si-yeong
Party	Liberal	Independent	Democratic Nationalist
Popular vote	5,238,769	797,504	764,715
Percentage	74.62%	11.36%	10.89%
President before election
Syngman Rhee
Liberal
Elected President
Syngman Rhee
Liberal
- Vice presidential election
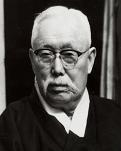

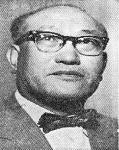

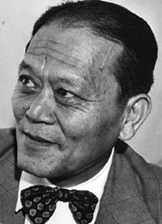

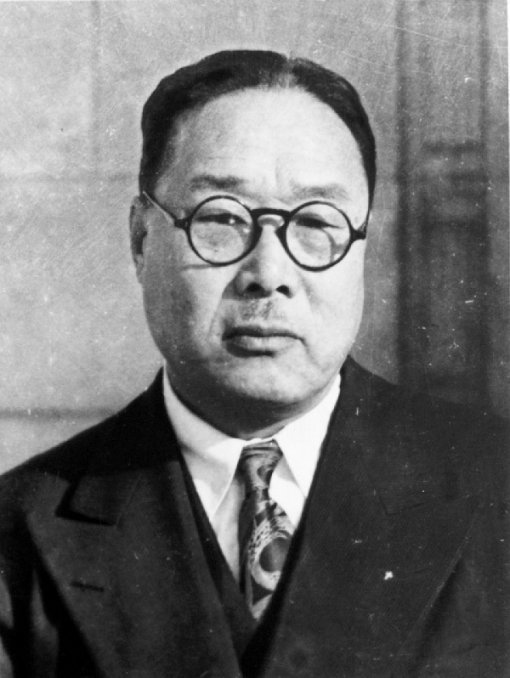
Candidate	Ham Tae-young	Lee Beom-seok	Chough Pyung-ok
Party	Independent	Liberal	Democratic Nationalist
Popular vote	2,943,813	1,815,692	575,260
Percentage	41.27%	25.45%	8.06%
	Liberal
Candidate	Lee Gap-sung	Yi Yun-yong
Party	Liberal	Social Democratic
Popular vote	500,972	458,583
Percentage	7.02%	6.43%
Vice President before election
Kim Seong-su
Liberal
Elected Vice President
Ham Tae-young
Independent

Presidential and vice presidential elections were held in South Korea on 5 August 1952. The result was a victory for Syngman Rhee, who won 74.6% of the vote. Voter turnout was 88.1%. The election was held during the Korean War, which played an important role in consolidating Rhee's support.

== Background ==
President Rhee's factions took a devastating blow in the 1950 legislative election, when they won a little more than a quarter of the seats in the National Assembly, combined. In belief he would have little shot at reelection in the opposition-controlled legislature, President Rhee decided to amend the constitution so that the president would be elected by the people, instead of the legislature. President Rhee had the amendment pass in July 1952, after using police and military to threaten lawmakers.

== Results ==
=== President ===
Candidate	Party	Votes	%
Syngman Rhee	Liberal Party	5,238,769	74.62
Cho Bong-am	Independent	797,504	11.36
Yi Si-yeong	Democratic Nationalist Party	764,715	10.89
Shin Heung-u	Independent	219,696	3.13
Total		7,020,684	100.00
Valid votes		7,020,684	96.49
Invalid/blank votes		255,199	3.51
Total votes		7,275,883	100.00
Registered voters/turnout		8,259,428	88.09
Source: Nohlen et al.

==== By province and city ====
Province/City	Syngman Rhee		Cho Bong-am		Yi Si-yeong		Shin Heung-u	
Province/City	Votes	%	Votes	%	Votes	%	Votes	%
Seoul	205,300	82.21	25,631	10.26	14,883	5.96	3,923	1.57
Gyeonggi	657,174	87.65	44,967	6.00	34,704	4.63	12,891	1.72
Gangwon	366,583	92.39	10,516	2.65	13,378	3.37	6,305	1.59
North Chungcheong	386,665	86.70	25,875	5.80	23,006	5.16	10,409	2.33
South Chungcheong	636,061	82.35	56,590	7.33	58,754	7.61	20,947	2.71
North Jeolla	468,220	65.93	109,490	15.42	96,271	13.56	36,221	5.10
South Jeolla	823,587	73.57	99,885	8.92	165,245	14.76	30,677	2.74
North Gyeongsang	921,988	75.01	129,791	10.56	140,271	11.41	37,100	3.02
South Gyeongsang	693,523	55.38	288,654	23.05	211,544	16.89	58,586	4.68
Jeju	79,668	83.80	6,105	6.42	6,659	7.00	2,637	2.77
Total	5,238,769	74.62	797,504	11.36	764,715	10.89	219,696	3.13
Source: National Election Commission

=== Vice president ===
Candidate	Party	Votes	%
Ham Tae-young	Independent	2,943,813	41.27
Lee Beom-seok	Liberal Party	1,815,692	25.45
Chough Pyung-ok	Democratic Nationalist Party	575,260	8.06
Lee Gap-sung	Liberal Party Movement	500,972	7.02
Yi Yun-yong	Choseon Democratic Party	458,583	6.43
Jeon Jin-han	General Alliance of Laborers for Korean Independence	302,471	4.24
Louise Yim	Liberal Party Movement	190,211	2.67
Pak Sung-wook	Independent	181,388	2.54
Jeong Ki-won	Liberal Party Movement	164,907	2.31
Total		7,133,297	100.00
Valid votes		7,133,297	98.11
Invalid/blank votes		137,585	1.89
Total votes		7,270,882	100.00
Registered voters/turnout		8,259,428	88.03

==== By province and city ====
Province/City	Ham Tae-young		Lee Beom-seok		Chough Pyung-ok		Lee Gap-sung		Yi Yun-yong		Jeon Jin-han		Louise Yim		Pak Sung-wook		Jeong Ki-won	
Province/City	Votes	%	Votes	%	Votes	%	Votes	%	Votes	%	Votes	%	Votes	%	Votes	%	Votes	%
Seoul	70,206	27.63	117,326	46.18	16,429	6.47	13,815	5.44	15,475	6.09	8,911	3.51	4,676	1.84	4,508	1.77	2,727	1.07
Gyeonggi	347,799	45.63	252,090	33.07	27,776	3.64	35,154	4.61	42,038	5.51	21,076	2.76	13,195	1.73	10,547	1.38	12,593	1.65
Gangwon	223,534	55.64	129,704	32.28	5,962	1.48	9,427	2.35	11,555	2.88	10,675	2.66	4,424	1.10	2,811	0.70	3,674	0.91
North Chungcheong	216,223	47.77	130,843	28.91	18,926	4.18	23,190	5.12	24,442	5.40	13,098	2.89	9,094	2.01	7,983	1.76	8,830	1.95
South Chungcheong	118,291	15.07	452,209	57.62	47,482	6.05	34,172	4.35	43,895	5.59	35,057	4.47	21,047	2.68	18,354	2.34	14,287	1.82
North Jeolla	190,246	26.27	235,637	32.54	67,731	9.35	48,554	6.70	63,729	8.80	34,750	4.80	37,024	5.11	24,985	3.45	21,500	2.97
South Jeolla	729,541	64.18	59,318	5.22	125,525	11.04	77,231	6.79	60,658	5.34	23,221	2.04	20,470	1.80	18,031	1.59	22,739	2.00
North Gyeongsang	716,794	57.44	97,256	7.79	100,498	8.05	115,755	9.28	73,684	5.90	50,884	4.08	28,263	2.26	32,719	2.62	31,980	2.56
South Gyeongsang	296,766	23.30	306,982	24.11	161,787	12.70	139,000	10.92	116,260	9.13	100,061	7.86	49,675	3.90	59,079	4.64	43,807	3.44
Jeju	34,413	35.99	34,327	35.90	3,144	3.29	4,674	4.89	6,847	7.16	4,738	4.95	2,343	2.45	2,371	2.48	2,770	2.90
Total	2,943,813	41.27	1,815,692	25.45	575,260	8.06	500,972	7.02	458,583	6.43	302,471	4.24	190,211	2.67	181,388	2.54	164,907	2.31
