= Ilminism =

Political ideology in South Korea

Hand-written poster promoting the "Ilminism" (1949).

Ilminism (Korean: 일민주의; Hanja: 一民主義; RR: Ilminjuui), frequently translated as the One-People Principle, One-People Doctrine, or Unidemism, was the national-conservative political ideology of South Korea under its first President, Syngman Rhee. The Ilminist principle has been likened by contemporary scholars to the Nazi ideal of the Herrenvolk (master race) and was part of an effort to consolidate a united and obedient citizenry around Rhee's strong central leadership through appeals to ultranationalism and ethnic supremacy. Also, this ideology was also marked by prominent state-nationalist elements influenced by the Empire of Japan’s Kokkashugi. In general, "Ilminists" often refers to pro-Syngman Rhee (groups).

== History ==
The concept had deep roots in disputes between different members of the Korean independence movement during Japanese rule. The debate was between so-called culturalists (문화주의론자), who argued that Korean backwardness required a strong and patriotic elite to guide the people into cultural civilization and enlightenment, that is, the Koreans needed to become a proper nation, versus the populists (민중투쟁론자), who maintained that the Koreans were already a sovereign nation and people from whom all legitimacy ultimately derived. Ilminism had been identified as being influenced by the culturalist stream of Korean thinking.

The concept was developed primarily by German-educated Minister of Education Ahn Ho-sang, who studied philosophy at the University of Jena in Germany during the late 1920s. It was connected with the Korean National Defense Student Corps (KNDSC), established on 22 April 1949. The nationalist doctrine was influenced by the statist youth groups Ahn had witnessed both as a student in Germany back in the 1920s as well as during the Asia-Pacific War. The doctrine was received unfavorably by various quarters when it first surfaced, but the onset of the Korean War in 1950 substantially increased its rapport with authorities.

After 1952, Ilminism was no longer mentioned, and Syngman Rhee's purges of Ilminist affiliates led to the demise of Ilminism.

== Ideology ==
The Ilminist Principle became the central ideology of Rhee's National Association and its successor, the Liberal Party, established in 1951.

Ilminism was based around a four-point political program, including elimination of formal discrimination between the nobility and the masses, the economic equalization of rich and poor through land reform, social and political equality of the sexes, and an end to discrimination between North and South or the urban capital and the rural provinces. An end to partisan politics was posited, in favor of a united people behind a de facto one-party state.

Ilminism was effective in creating a strong anti-communist nationalism to stand in juxtaposition to the effective appeals to nationalism made through the Democratic Front for the Reunification of the Fatherland, headed by Kim Il Sung and the communist Workers' Party of Korea.

=== Northward reunification ===
The Ilminists were belligerent anti-communists. Despite U.S. opposition, they insisted on "Northward reunification" (북진통일), in which South Korean troops marched North, overthrew the North Korean government on the Korean Peninsula, eliminated communist forces, and occupied all areas of the peninsula by force to build a non-communist unified-ROK.

== Association for the Propagation of Ilminism ==
The Association for the Propagation of Ilminism (일민주의보급회; 一民主義普及會) was a nationalist organization founded in September 1949. The organization aimed at promoting popularism centered on Syngman Rhee, led by former members of the Korean National Youth Association led by Lee Bum-seok and Ahn Ho-sang. It criticized both capitalism and communism, but had a pro-American tendency. Due to the intensifying Cold War, anti-capitalism sentiment did not increase during this time period.

== See also ==
- Juche, political ideology of North Korea
- Korean National Youth Association
- Corporatism
- Ethnocracy, or "ethno-state"
