= Lee Beom-seok (prime minister) =

Prime Minister of South Korea from 1948 to 1950

His Excellency Lee Beom-seok
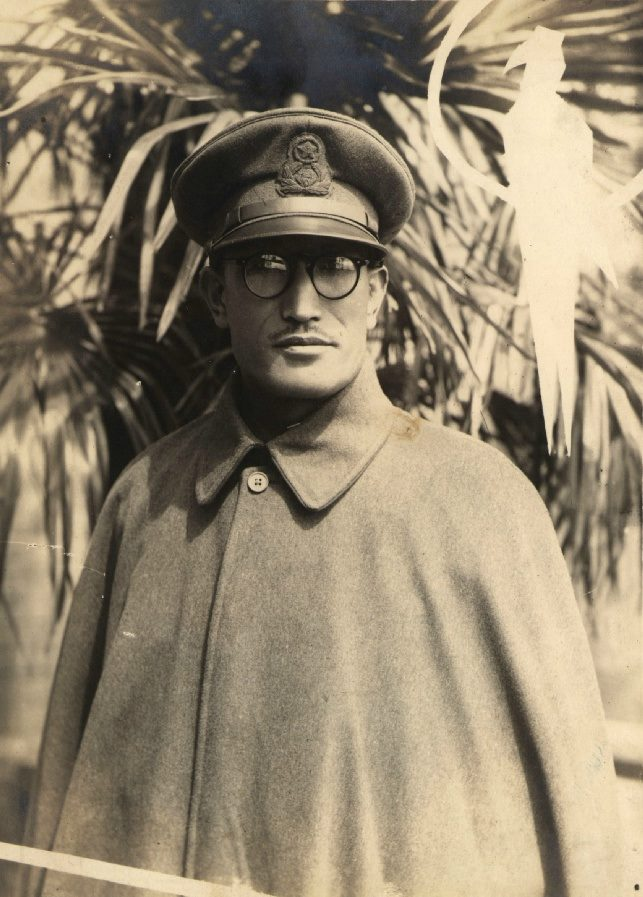

1st Minister of National Defense
- In office August 15, 1948 – March 20, 1949
- President: Syngman Rhee
- Prime Minister: Himself
- Vice President: Yi Si-yeong
- Preceded by: Position established
- Succeeded by: Shin Song-mo

1st Prime Minister of South Korea
- In office July 31, 1948 – April 20, 1950
- President: Syngman Rhee
- Vice President: Yi Si-yeong
- Preceded by: Position established
- Succeeded by: Shin Sung-mo (acting)

Member of the House of Councillors of the Republic of Korea (5th National Assembly)
- In office August 8, 1960 – May 16, 1961
- President: Yun Po Sun
- Prime Minister: Chang Myon
- Vice President: Position abolished

Personal details
- Born: October 20, 1900 Hwangseong, Korean Empire
- Died: May 11, 1972 (aged 71) Seoul, South Korea
- Party: Liberal
- Spouse: Kim Maria

Military service
- Allegiance: (Provisional Government of the Republic of Korea) Korean Provisional Government; South Korea
- Branch/service: Korean Liberation Army
- Rank: General
- Battles/wars: Battle of Qingshanli

Korean name
- Hangul: 이범석
- Hanja: 李範奭
- RR: I Beomseok
- MR: I Pŏmsŏk

Art name
- Hangul: 철기
- Hanja: 鐵驥
- RR: Cheolgi
- MR: Ch'ŏlgi
- Clan: Jeonju Yi clan

Lee Beom-seok (Korean: 이범석; October 20, 1900 – May 11, 1972), also known by his art name Cheolgi, was a Korean independence activist who served as the prime minister of South Korea from 1948 to 1950. During the Japanese rule of Korea, he participated in the armed independence movement in Northeast China and served as the Chief of Staff of the Korean Liberation Army. He headed the Korean National Youth Association after the nation's independence. Upon the establishment of the government of the Republic of Korea in 1948, he served as the first Prime Minister and the Minister of National Defense.

== Early life ==
Lee Beom-seok on October 20, 1900, was born in Seoul, Korean Empire. His father, Lee Mun-ha, was a government official. He was a descendant of Sejong the Great's son Gwangpyeong Daegun (광평대군; 廣平大君).

== Career in exile ==
Lee and thousands of other Korean independence activists went into exile in the Republic of China after the violent suppression by the Japanese of the March First Movement.

In 1919, he started studying at the Shinheung military academy (Korean: 신흥무관학교; Hanja: 新興武官學校), which was created to build an army to fight for independence. Soon after, Lee fought in the Battle of Cheongsanni, a six-day engagement in eastern Manchuria.

In 1941, he served as a general and chief of staff in the Korean Liberation Army, the army of the Provisional Government of the Republic of Korea. He was also instrumental in negotiating with the US Office of Strategic Services to create the Eagle Project, a joint mission with the Provisional Government to infiltrate occupied Korea during World War II.

In 1945, Lee attempted to return to Korea but was forced to remain in exile in China.

== Career after liberation of Korea ==
In 1946, Lee returned to Korea and helped found the Korean National Youth Association with Ahn Ho-sang. He was opposed to Kim Ku's South-North negotiation (남북협상; 南北協商) plans and allied himself with Syngman Rhee to establish a unitary government in South Korea. He served as the new country's first prime minister from July 31, 1948, to April 20, 1950.

Following his term in office, he served as the Korean Ambassador to the Republic of China, and as Secretary of the Interior. He ran for the vice presidency in 1952, and again in 1956, but failed to win either election. Throughout the 1960s, he remained a staunch opposition leader to the ruling party. At the end of his career, Lee served as an adviser on the Board of National Unification (국토통일원; 國土統一院) and mentored Park Chung Hee as an elder of the nation.

On May 10, 1972, he was granted an honorary doctorate by the Taiwan Chinese Academy.

== Death ==
Lee died on May 11, 1972, a day after receiving his honorary degree. He died of a myocardial infarction in the Seongmo hospital of Myeong-dong in Seoul. His state funeral was held in the plaza on the mountain Namsan on May 17, and he was buried in Seoul National Cemetery.

== Bibliography ==
- Udungbul (우둥불)
- Bangrangui Jeong-yeol (Passion of Wandering; 방랑의 정열)
- Hangug-ui Bunno (Rage of Korea; 한국의 분노)
- Minjok Gwa Cheongnyeon (Nationality and the Youth; 민족과 청년)
- Hyeoljeon: Cheongsanni Jakjeon (Bloody battle: Strategy of Cheongsanni; 혈전: 청산리 작전)
- Tomsk-ui Haneul Arae (Under the Tomsk's Sky; 톰스크의 하늘아래)

== See also ==
- Fascism in Asia
  - Ilminism
  - Korean National Youth Association
- Korean independence movement

== Site web ==
- Lee Beom-seok Memorial museum (in Korean)
- Lee Beom-seok (in Korean)
- (in Korean) 국무총리
- Prime Minister

Preceded by Office created	Prime Minister of South Korea; 1948–1950	Succeeded by Shin Sung-mo (acting)
Preceded by Office created	Minister of National Defence of South Korea; 1948–1949	Succeeded by Shin Sung-mo
Preceded by Chnag Seok-yun	Interior Minister of South Korea; 1952	Succeeded by Kim Tae-sun
