= Chough Pyung-ok =

South Korean politician (1894–1960)

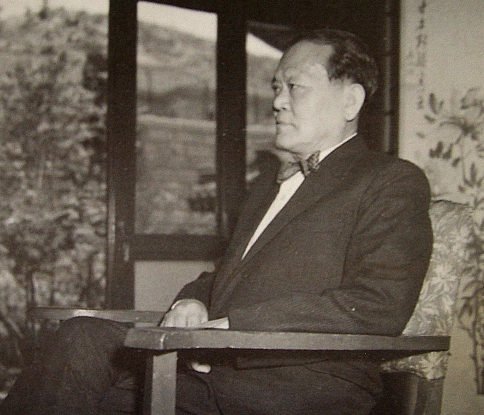

Personal details
- Born: 21 May 1894 Cheonan, South Chungcheong Province, Joseon
- Died: 15 February 1960 (aged 65) Walter Reed Army Medical Center, Washington, DC, United States
- Cause of death: Stomach Cancer
- Party: Democratic Party
- Spouse(s): No Jeong-myeon (노정면; 盧禎冕)

Korean name
- Hangul: 조병옥
- Hanja: 趙炳玉
- RR: Jo Byeongok
- MR: Cho Pyŏngok

Art name
- Hangul: 유석
- Hanja: 維石
- RR: Yuseok
- MR: Yusŏk

Chough Pyung-ok (Note: also Cho Pyung-ok or Cho Byeong-ok) (Korean: 조병옥; 21 May 1894 – 15 February 1960) was a South Korean politician. He ran against incumbent president Syngman Rhee in the 1960 presidential election but died on February 15, one month before the election on March 15. Rhee received 90% of the vote. He was the first Director of the Korean National Police from 1945 to 1949 and Minister of Home Affairs during the early stages of the Korean War.

== Biography ==
Born in Mokcheon, a neighbourhood in Cheonan, South Chungcheong Province, Joseon in 1894. Chough's family was wealthy, and in 1914, sent him to the United States for his education. He attended a high school in Kingston in the state of Pennsylvania before going on to study at Columbia University in New York. He graduated with a Bachelor of Arts in 1922 and proceed to gain a Doctorate in Economics in 1925.

On completing his tertiary education, Chough returned to Korea and worked as a teacher at Chŏson Christian College. A nationalist, he was imprisoned in 1929 by the Japanese authorities for his activities. In September 1945, following the end of the Japanese occupation, he was one of the founding members of the conservative Korean Democratic Party (KDP). The following month, under the American Military Government, established to control the southern half of Korea as it prepared for independence, Chough became director of the Korean National Police; he was selected for the role by the Americans. In some quarters of the American Military Government there was dislike for his harsh methods against Korean communists, but he was otherwise deemed to be capable.

Following the establishment of South Korea in 1948, Chough was the country's representative to the United Nations. He was also an emissary for Syngman Rhee, the country's first president. In July 1950, he was appointed Minister of Home Affairs. With the ROK now embroiled in a conflict with North Korea, following the latter's invasion of the south, he worked to boost the numbers and provisions of the KNP. Much of the KNP's work involved dealing with North Korean infiltrators that were moving to the south, hidden amongst refugees. By November 1950, he claimed that the KNP had arrested over 55,000 "collaborators and traitors". He fell out with Rhee after the Geochang massacre; Rhee had interfered with the resulting investigation and released the perpetrators under an amnesty. In early 1951, Chough resigned his ministerial post in protest.

He continued to be critical of Rhee, particularly at time of the latter's unilateral decision in mid-1953 to release North Korean prisoners of war during the armistice talks at Panmunjom. Chough argued that this negatively impacted the ROK's diplomatic relationships. By 1956, he had risen to be head of the KDP. In the 1960 presidential election, Chough was the KDP's candidate for the presidency of the ROK, opposing Rhee.

== Death ==
Partway through Chough's 1960 campaign, he became ill with cancer. He was taken to the United States for medical treatment at Walter Reed Army Medical Center in Washington, DC, but died there on February 15, 1960.

== Works ==
- 나의 회고록 [My memoir]. 民敎社 [Mungyosa]. 1959.
- 민주주의와 나 [Democracy and I]. 永信文化社 [Yeongsun Munhwasa]. 1959.

== In popular culture ==
- Portrayed by Kim Mu-saeng in the 1981–1982 TV series 1st Republic.
