= Korean National Youth Association =

1946–1949 political party in South Korea

Korean National Youth Association 조선민족청년단 朝鮮民族靑年團
- Leader: Lee Beom-seok; Lee Jun-sik
- Founder: Lee Beom-seok
- Founded: 9 October 1946; 80 years ago
- Dissolved: 20 January 1949; 77 years ago
- Succeeded by: Korean Youth Association; Liberal Party (de facto)
- Headquarters: Seoul
- Ideology: Neo-fascism; Ultranationalism; Ilminism; Third Position; Anti-communism; Anti-capitalism; Factions: Anti-imperialism; Left-wing nationalism (Note: At that time, anti-communist left-wing nationalists in South Korea were close to Third-worldism.)
- Political position: Far-right; Factions: Left-wing
- Colours: Sky blue

Party flag

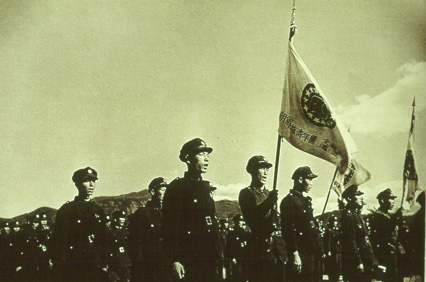
Korean National Youth Association (조선민족청년단): Lee Kyung Mo (이경모), the site of the turbulent period (격동기의 현장, 눈빛), 1991, 36

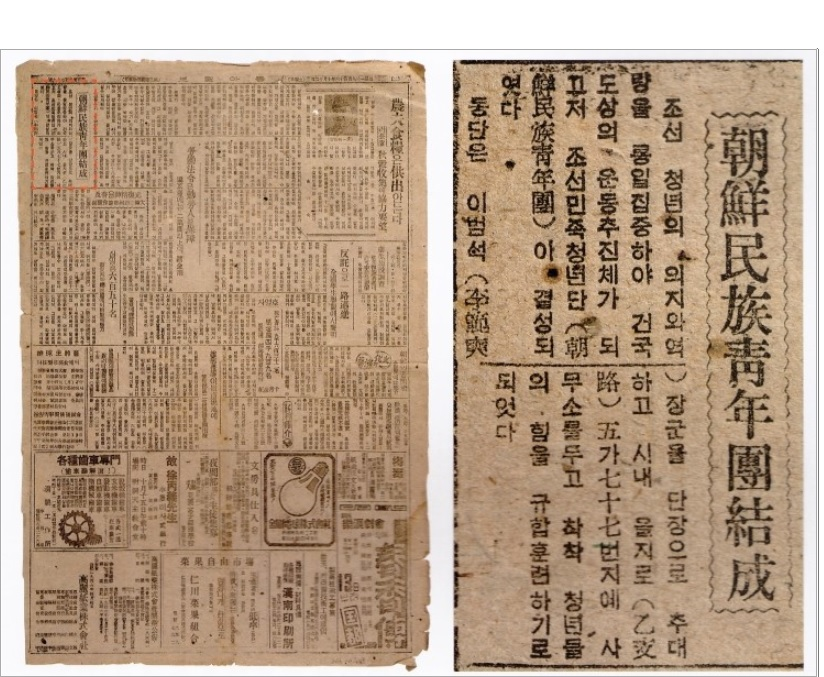
'Korean National Youth Association was organized (조선민족청년단 결성)', article in DongA Newspaper, October 12, 1946. It was reported that the government formed Jokcheong to become an activist group for the National Foundation of South Korea by concentrating the will and ability of the young people of Joseon.

The Korean National Youth Association (Korean: 조선민족청년단; Hanja: 朝鮮民族靑年團), abbreviated as Jokcheong (족청; 族靑; lit. 'National Youth'), was a South Korean nationalist youth organization founded on 9 October 1946 and led by Lee Beom-seok. The organization was established with the support of the U.S. military government and grew to over one million members by 1948. Its leaders described it as a "Third Way" that rejected both capitalism and communism. Scholar Fujii Takeshi has characterized its ideology as intersecting fascism and resistance nationalism, and the organization actively recruited members from left-wing backgrounds. It was disbanded in 1949 under the direction of President Syngman Rhee.

== History ==
=== Foundation ===
The Association was a right-wing youth group organized by Lee Beom-seok with the full support of the U.S. military government in October 1946. It stated that its principles were apolitical, non-military, and non-sectarian, and focused on youth training, eventually organizing over one million young people. Lee Beom-seok showed strong nationalist tendencies and actively recruited figures from left-wing backgrounds. The Association served as the base for Lee's political activities and was disbanded under Syngman Rhee's direction in 1949. However, former members continued to operate as the "Jokcheong faction" (족청계) and later played a central role in the establishment of the Liberal Party.

=== Configuration ===
The organization's central headquarters was established in the former Japanese Army Hospital building in Suwon, Gyeonggi Province, where a training center was set up. Lee Beom-seok served as the head of the organization, with Lee Jun-sik and Kim Hyung-won serving as vice-leaders. Following the establishment of the South Korean government in 1948, President Syngman Rhee ordered the consolidation of all youth groups, leading to the organization's dissolution in 1949.

=== Doctrine ===
The organization's stated doctrine, known as "Danjisamchik" (團旨三則), expressed its goals in nationalist terms. According to its founding principles, the group aimed to "fulfill the mission of young people under the ideology of nation-first and state-first by invoking the spirit of the nation." It also declared its intention to "rally the capabilities of the nation in the spirit of national independence and international co-existence beyond sectarian divisions."

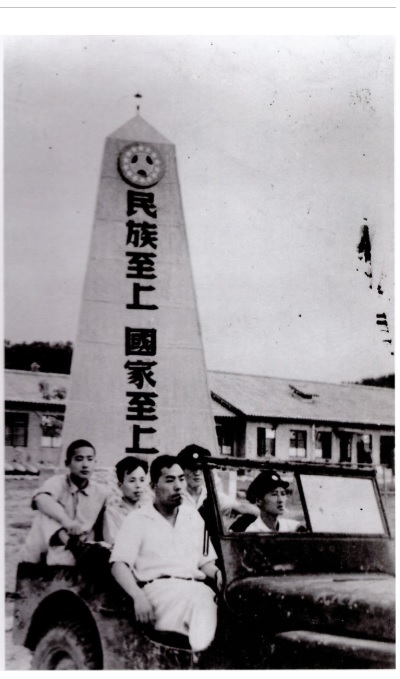
The photo was taken at the Korean National Youth Association Central Training Center in Suwon. It features five people riding in jeep cars against the backdrop of a tower that reads "Racism first, nationalism first", the slogan of the Korean National Youth Association.

=== Activation ===
The Korean National Youth Association established a training center in Suwon in November 1946 with the support of the U.S. military government and conducted a one-month training program for youth. According to the organization's records, 20,000 people applied for the program, of whom 200 were selected for the first batch of trainees announced in December 1946. Female trainees were admitted from the seventh class onward. The training program consisted of five categories: mental, physical, theory, life, and practical training. Lecturers in the theory section included Jeong In-bo, An Ho-sang, Bae Seong-ryong, and others, covering topics such as nationalism and youth activism. Lee Beom-seok personally lectured on the political situation and his vision for the youth movement.

According to the organization's own accounts, it sought to channel the energy of young people into the youth movement. The Korean Youth Association has transformed the characteristics of young people, namely their vitality, passion, desire to seek out, self-consciousness, experience, and purity, into the productive forces of youth movement and struggle. Under Lee Beom-seok's leadership, trainees returned to their local areas to establish branches of the Jokcheong organization, expanding its reach across the country. As the organization grew, it faced criticism from political circles and segments of society, with some characterizing it as an extension of the Liberation Army, an autocratic movement, or a mercenary organization.

Former members of the Jokcheong faction played a central role in establishing the Liberal Party in December 1951, holding an establishment ceremony at Dong-A Theater in Busan. They adopted the platform and constitution, resulting in the creation of two anti-communist parties of the same name. It is the so-called Liberal Party. The pro-opposition Liberal Party was defeated by representative Syngman Rhee as its presidential candidate, and Vice President Lee Beom-seok was defeated, and independent candidate Ham Tae-young was elected in May 1952.

The Liberal Party's national convention was scheduled to convene within 40 days of the government's election. However, the Jokcheong faction became embroiled in significant political infighting, as it expected to gain influence based on the election results. The faction criticized those within the party who had been uncooperative during the elections. During this period, the faction also accused Prime Minister Chang Taek-sang and Interior Minister Kim Tae-sun of violating election law, leading to an open political struggle.

Subsequently, Kim Tae-sun resigned as mayor of Seoul, and Chang Taek-sang stepped down as prime minister after being involved in a political scandal known as the "Go Si-jin incident." In May 1953, a national convention led by the Jokcheong faction was held in Daejeon to consolidate power following the political and non-governmental elections. According to some observers, the intra-party conflict that culminated at this convention represented a religious struggle within the Liberal Party, which ultimately led to the effective dissolution of the Jokcheong faction's influence.

In September 1953, Rhee issued a statement calling for the elimination of the Jokcheong faction. In the statement, he argued that certain members of the Liberal Party, primarily from the older generation, were opposing his intentions and harming party unity, thereby endangering the national spirit. He declared that these elements should be purged, even if it caused them pain.

Following these events, Lee Beom-seok agreed to integrate the Jokcheong into the Great Korean Young Adults Association and appointed five representatives from the Liberal Party to oversee the process. Consequently, in January 1954, the Jokcheong was formally dissolved. In a final statement, the organization remarked that "the merits and demerits of our youth movement will be duly assessed when the Korean people revive."

== Backgrounds ==
Lee Beom-seok considered it a priority to organize and train young people to serve as a foundational force for the newly liberated nation. With the support of the U.S. military government, he established the "congress" to achieve this goal.

In 1946, the U.S. military secretly provided approximately $5 million in equipment and dispatched a colonel to serve as a training consultant for the formation of the Jokcheong, viewing the youth organization as a necessary asset.

The funds for the organization were provided by the Douglas MacArthur Command in Tokyo, rather than directly from the U.S. military government in Korea. MacArthur's command supplied equipment, including vehicles and uniforms. The philosopher Ahn Ho-sang provided the ideological rationale for the organization.

The Jokcheong established a board of directors that included Kim Hwal-ran, Baek Nak-jun, Choi Gyu-dong, and Hyun Sang-yoon. The organization set up its central headquarters in the former Japanese Army Hospital building in Suwon, Gyeonggi Province. According to reports, approximately 70,000 individuals received secret training at the Suwon center, which was conducted discreetly to avoid Soviet protests. The training was reportedly intended to prepare participants for future military service, and many of those trained were later incorporated into the armed forces.

Membership in the Jokcheong grew from its founding on October 9, 1946, to 300,000 by November 1947, 1.15 million by August 1948, and 1.2 million by the fall of 1948. In April 1947, when Chi Ch'ŏngch'ŏn, commander of the Korean Liberation Army, returned to Korea and formed the Daedong Youth Corps, he proposed a merger between the two organizations. However, Lee Beom-seok declined the offer, and the Jokcheong subsequently entered into a rivalry with the Daedong Youth Corps.

Some scholars and commentators have characterized the Jokcheong as nationalistic and totalitarian in nature.

In the general elections of the Constitutional Council of Korea on May 10, 1948, six members affiliated with the Jokcheong were elected, and they later formed a floor negotiation group in the National Assembly. However, in November 1948, President Rhee ordered the consolidation of all youth organizations. After initial resistance, the Jokcheong was eventually absorbed into the Great Korean Young Adults Association in 1949.

Lee Beom-seok resisted the step-by-step integration of the Jokcheong into the Great Korean Young Adults Association as ordered by Rhee. In response, Rhee issued a statement on January 5, 1949, officially calling for the dissolution of the Jokcheong. On January 20, 1949, the organization was formally disbanded, and Lee Beom-seok was dismissed as defense minister.

Following the disbandment, former members of the Jokcheong continued to operate as the "Jokcheong faction" (족청계) and played a central role in the establishment of the Liberal Party. However, in December 1953, Lee Beom-seok and his followers were expelled from the party.

== See also ==
- Fascism in Asia
- Ilminism
