= Song Yi-kyun =

Korean independence activist (1885–1927)

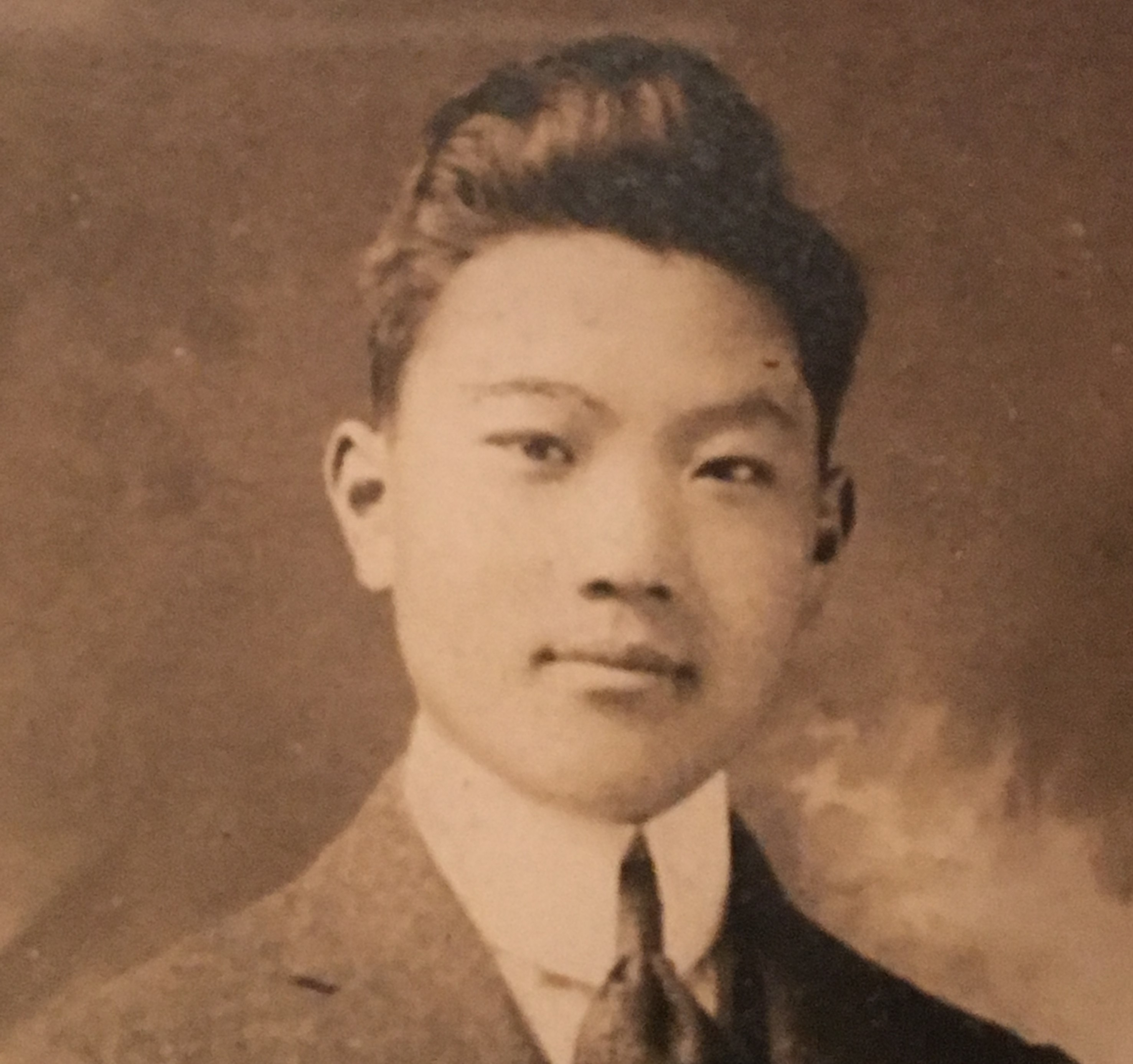
- Born: February 28, 1885; Pyongyang, Joseon
- Died: November 27, 1927; Stockton, California, US
- Known for: Korean Independence Activist

Korean name
- Hangul: 송이균
- Hanja: 宋二均
- RR: Song Igyun
- MR: Song Igyun

Song Yi-kyun (Korean: 송이균; Hanja: 宋二均; 1885–1927) was a Korean-American activist in the Korean independence movement.

== Life ==
Song Yi-Kyun was born in 1885 in Pyongyang, Korea. In 1913, he left Pyongyang to San Francisco for work. Shortly after his arrival, he became actively involved in the Korean independence movement and joined the Korean National Association (대한인) in October 1914, during the earlier years of the organization. From 1915 to 1916, he served as a student assistant in the Sacramento Regional Societies which was under the North American General Assembly of the KNA.

In May 1920, he became the commissioner of the Princeton District and provided financial support for the Independent Newspaper of the newly formed Provisional Government of the Republic of Korea. He also collected donations for the North American General Assembly and served as a recruiting committee member for the Princeton region for the relief of Korean and Chinese-Korean Families. In 1921 and 1922, he continued supplying funds for the Independence Movement as the treasurer of the Sacramento Regional Congress, and the Maxwell Regional Association.

While working for the KNA, he helped establish the Willows Korean Aviation School in Glenn County, CA. He was the assistant administrator and in July 1920 published "The Prospectus of Korean Aviation School" to recruit Korean aviators for the Korean Independence Movement.

From 1914 to 1926, he supported the independence movement fund several times. He continued his work in the KNA until 1927, when he suffered fatal injuries to the head from a plane crash.

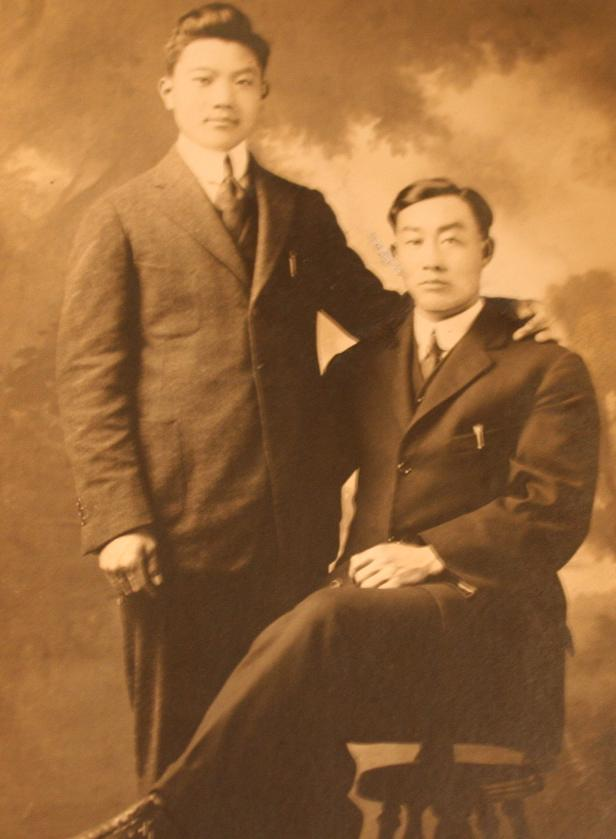
1920s photo of Song Yi-kyun and his older brother, Song Oh-kyun .

== Legacy ==
In 2016, Song Yi-Kyun was posthumously awarded the President's Commendation Award (대통령표창) for his contributions during the Korean Independence Movement.

== See also ==
- History of Korea
- Provisional Government of Republic of Korea
- Korean independence movement
- Korean National Association
- Sinhan Minbo
- Song Oh-kyun

== Bibliography ==
- The New Korea, no. 386 (1916 Feb. 8), retrieved from http://digitallibrary.usc.edu/cdm/compoundobject/collection/p15799coll43/id/3985/rec/1
- The New Korea, no. 423 (1917 Feb. 15), retrieved from http://digitallibrary.usc.edu/cdm/compoundobject/collection/p15799coll43/id/4155/rec/34
- Kunminhoe Membership List, retrieved from http://digitallibrary.usc.edu/cdm/compoundobject/collection/p15799coll126/id/10959/rec/3
- The New Korea, no. 724 (1920 Dec. 23), retrieved from http://digitallibrary.usc.edu/cdm/compoundobject/collection/p15799coll43/id/5660/rec/57
- Chang T.E., & Han, W.S. (2015) Korean American Pioneer Aviators: The Willows Airmen. Lanham, Maryland: Lexington Books
- The New Korea, no. 705 (1920 Aug. 12) http://digitallibrary.usc.edu/cdm/compoundobject/collection/p15799coll43/id/5590/rec/43
- The New Korea, no. 953 (1924 Jan 24), retrieved from http://digitallibrary.usc.edu/cdm/compoundobject/collection/p15799coll43/id/6320/rec/11
- The New Korea no. 721 (1920, Dec. 2), retrieved from http://digitallibrary.usc.edu/cdm/compoundobject/collection/p15799coll43/id/5675/rec/60
- Jang Tae Han. (2014 April 24), [1920, 대한민국 하늘을 열다-39] 비행학교/비행대 창설 (12)1920년 7월5일 공식 개교. Korea Daily http://www.koreadaily.com/news/read.asp?art_id=2493910
- Korean Ministry of Patriots & Veterans Affairs. (n.d.). Retrieved from http://www.mpva.go.kr/narasarang/gonghun_view.asp?id=14820&ipp=50
