= Song Oh-kyun =

Korean independence activist (1892–1970)

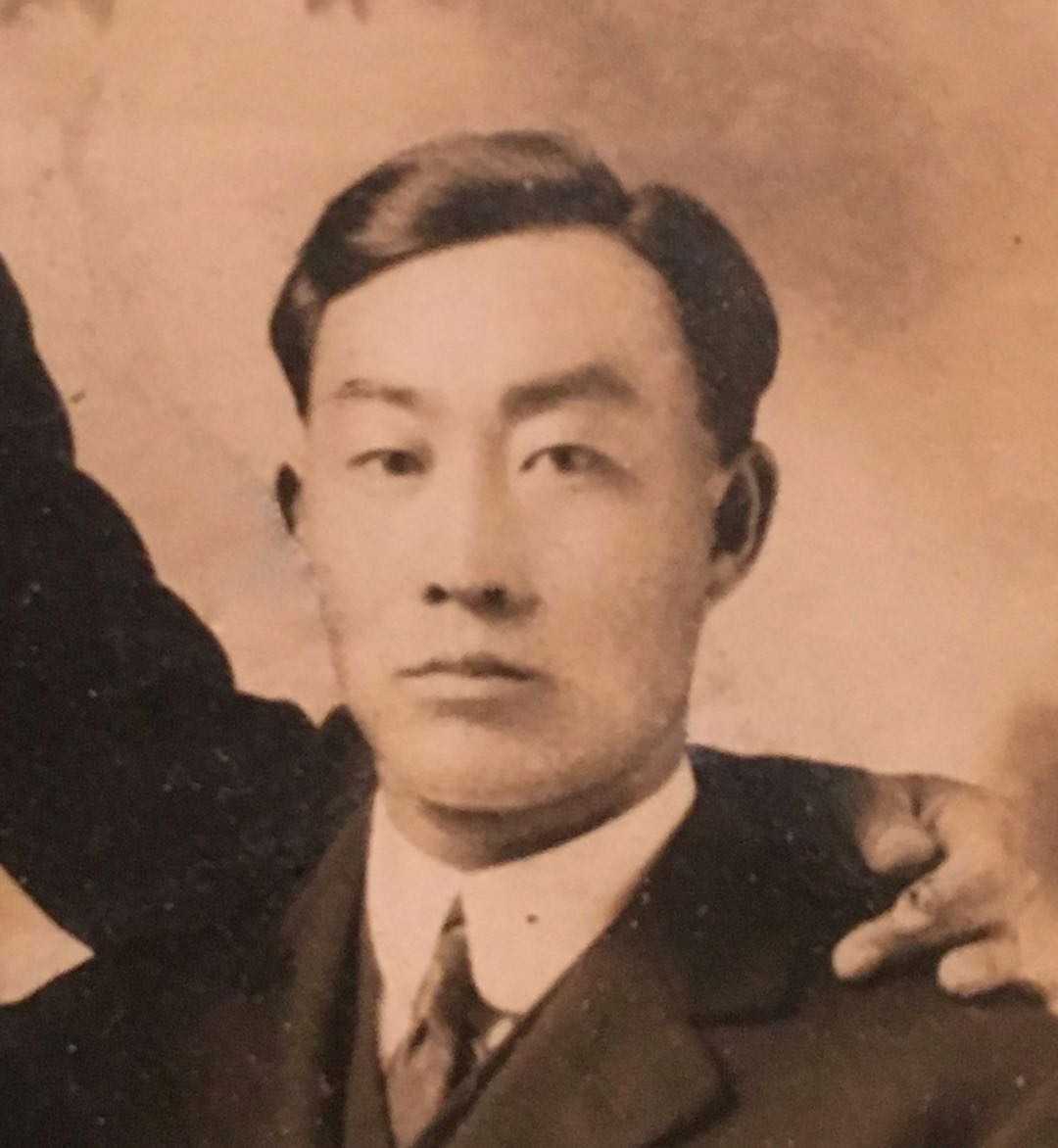
- Born: February 28, 1892; Pyongyang, Joseon
- Died: June 20, 1970; Los Angeles, California
- Known for: Korean Independence Activist

Korean name
- Hangul: 송오균
- Hanja: 宋五均
- RR: Song Ogyun
- MR: Song Ogyun

Song Oh-kyun (Korean: 송오균; Hanja: 宋五均; February 28, 1892 – June 20, 1970) was a rice farmer and Korean independence activist who was deeply involved in the Korean Independence Movement in the US. Between 1926 and 1945, he took leading positions in the Korean National Association (KNA), the largest Korean immigrant political organization, founded in February 1909 by Ahn Chang-ho.

== Biography ==
Song Oh-Kyun was born in Pyongyang, Joseon, in 1892. In October 1916, he immigrated to the US following his studies in Shanghai. He attended the University of Southern California and received a master's degree in liberal arts. As a student, he was involved in organizations such as the Young Korean Academy, and after graduating in 1926, he joined his older brother Song Yi-kyun in taking various responsibilities within the North American Regional branch of the KNA.

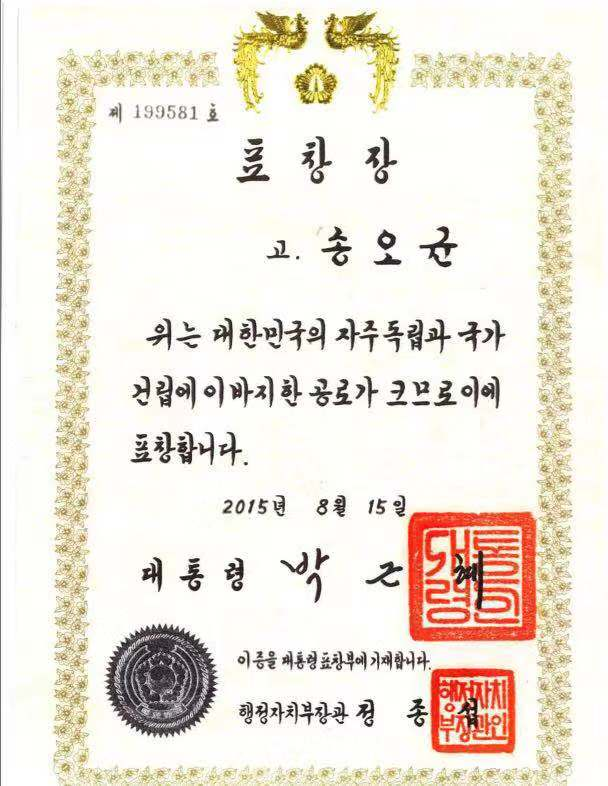
2015 South Korean Presidential Commendation Award (대통령표창)

During his years in the KNA, he was involved in both its internal affairs and political activities in the Korean Independence Movement. He began his work in 1927 as a judicial officer in the Sacramento local assembly of the KNA. The following year, he participated in the 19th Delegates' Conference of the General Assembly of the KNA as a deputy delegate of the Los Angeles Local Assembly and then was chosen as a Bill Amendment Committee member. In February 1931, he became a business staff member and in April a Dues Collection Committee member until 1938 when he was selected as a member of the Central Executive Committee of the KNA. In 1943 and 1944, he was an Inspection Committee member of the Los Angeles Local Assembly, and in October 1944, a Central Inspection Committee member of the Central Executive Committee at the 9th Representatives' Convention of the KNA.

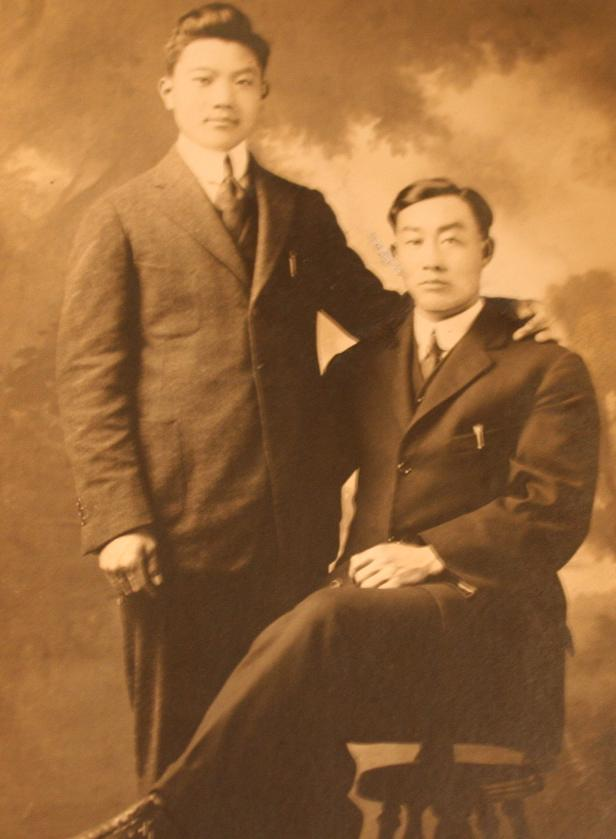
Song Oh-Kyun and his older brother, Song Yi-kyun.

After the liberation of Korea from Japanese rule, he remained active in the organization as a Business Committee member in the Los Angeles Local Assembly and a Collections Committee member in the Overseas Ethnic Koreans' Convention. As a member of the KNA, he supported the organization's independence movement fund on several occasions. He would also donate money to support Korean immigrants in other countries, such as Cuba and Mexico.

== Legacy ==
Following Song Oh-Kyun's death in 1970, the Korean newspaper Sinhan Minbo paid tribute to his decades of work for the Korean National Association. In 2015, the 70th anniversary of Korea's liberation from Japan, he was posthumously awarded the Presidential Commendation Award (대통령표창) by the Republic of Korea for contributing to the interests of the nation. The Song family was officially presented with the award in a ceremony held on January 18, 2019 at the Consulate General of the Republic of Korea in Los Angeles.

== See also ==
- History of Korea
- Provisional Government of Republic of Korea
- Korean independence movement
- Korean National Association
- Sinhan Minbo
- Song Yi-kyun
