= Korean National Army Corps =

1920 Korean independence activist army

- Leader: Park Yong-man
- Founded: 1914
- Dissolved: 1917
- Country: Korea
- Headquarters: Ahuimanu, Hawaii (1914); Kahuku, Hawaii (1915)
- Ideology: Korean independence movement
- Size: 300
- Part of: Korean National Association

- Korean National Army Corps
- Hangul: 대조선국민군단
- Hanja: 大朝鮮國民軍團
- Revised Romanization: Daejoseongungmingundan
- McCune–Reischauer: Taejosŏn'gungmin'gundan

The Korean National Army Corps (Korean: 대조선국민군단) was a military training group established by Park Yong-man on June 10, 1914, at the Ahuimanu Pineapple Farm in Kahaluu, Koolau, Oahu, Hawaii for the purpose of training military officers for the Korean Independence Movement. Due to pressure from the Empire of Japan and the United States, as well as drought affecting their crops, they were forced to close down.

== Background ==
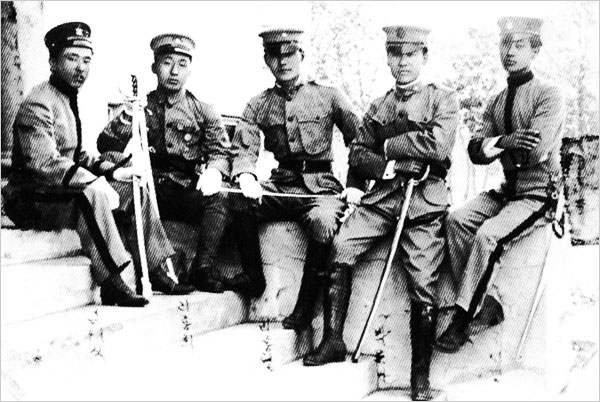
Teachers and students of the Youth Military School in Hastings, Nebraska, with Park Yong-man on the center-left.

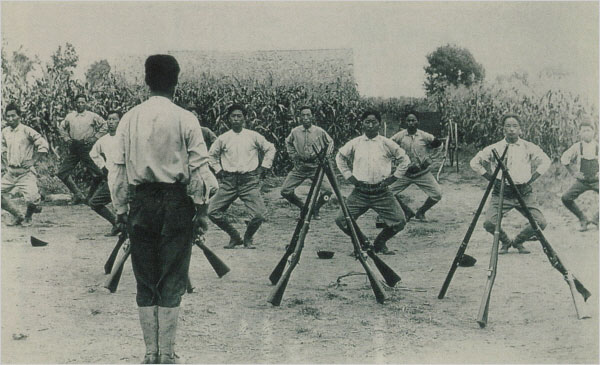
Students undergoing military training at the Hastings Youth Military School

The first Koreans arrived in Hawaii on January 13, 1903. Despite the difficult labor process, Koreans gave 25% of their income as an independent contribution. Independence activist Park Yong-man was also included among the immigrants. Park Yong-man, who emigrated to the US in February 1905, studied political science at Hastings College in University of Nebraska–Lincoln and joined the Reserve Officers' Training Corps in September 1908. In 1909, Park Yong-man rented a building at the university to board his students and give them military training, established the Youth Military School in Hastings, Nebraska. It was the first of its kind in the Korean community overseas. It was an organization created to spread the need for an anti-Japanese war of independence among the Korean American community by inheriting the spirit of the military movement. The school was operated as a summer military school system, like the current ROTC, where each child studied at school during the semester and entered during summer vacation to receive training for an average of 8 weeks. The Youth Military School produced about 40 graduates over a six-year period. After graduation, they either worked as independent soldiers in Manchuria or Russia or joined the U.S. Army and fought on the European front. Among these, widely known figures include Kim Yong-seong (Captain of Maeng Ho-gun Battalion, Korean National Guard in Los Angeles), Lee Hee-kyung (First President of the Korean Red Cross and Provisional Deputy Foreign Minister), Jeong Han-kyung (Ambassador of the Permanent Mission to Japan), Kim Hyeon-gu (Chairman of the Hawaiian Regional General Assembly of the National Association), and Yu Il-han ( Yuhan Corporation founder), Koo Young-sook (the first Minister of Health), etc.

In 1912, Park Yong-man, who was appointed editor-in-chief of the San Francisco's 'Shinhan Minbo' and Hawaii's 'Kukminbo' newspaper of the Hawaiian Regional General Assembly of the Korean National Association, worked hard to realize in Hawaii the national duty system and Korean autonomy system that had been advocated in North America as part of the construction of a provisional government. Thus, he established the national duty system in the Korean community in Hawaii.

In May 1913, he received special police authority approval from the Hawaiian government and established Korean National Association police departments on each Hawaiian island. As a result, he established the Korean autonomous system, and as a result, the Hawaiian court also designated the National Association police. Investigations and preliminary examinations were recognized as legal events. This exercise of police power was meant to serve as an autonomous government, excluding the intervention of the Japanese government, which sought to place overseas Koreans under Japanese rule. In December 1913, Park Yong-man promoted the establishment of a corps and a military academy to carry out the war of independence based on the soldier training movement promoted as part of the affairs department of the Hawaiian District General Assembly of the Korean National Association.

== History ==
In December 1913, Park Yong-man was promoting the establishment of a corps and a military academy based on the independence army training plan that was in progress at the Department of Military Affairs of the Hawaiian District General Assembly of the Korean National Association. Park Yong-man wanted to create a military academy composed of 2,000 to 3,000 men to train troops and soldiers who would later fight for independence. Yongman Park tried everything he could to raise his funds. The role and contribution of Park Jong-su and An Won-gyu were significant in training the independence army. Ahn Won-gyu, who was leading the Hawaiian General Assembly of the Korean National Association at the time, introduced Park Yong-man to Park Jong-su.

In 1914, when the Japanese Consulate General in San Francisco protested this military training to Hastings College, which provided facilities for the child soldier school, the child soldier school had no choice but to close after six years in the summer of 1914 and due to financial difficulties.

=== Receiving the land ===
Park Jong-su, a Hawaiian immigrant from Jeungsan, Pyeongan-do, immigrated with his family in 1904 and began farming pineapples by renting land from a white man. The pineapple industry grew new instead of sugarcane, which was the main crop in Hawaii. According to 'Park Jong-su's memoir', he was leasing about 400 acres of land for five years from a supply contract with an American pineapple canned processing company and was running a farm in the Ahuimanu area and the Kahalu area on the east side of Oahu at the end of 1913.

On June 10, 1914, after hearing Park Yong-man's aspirations, Park Jong-su readily handed donated his 1,500-acre Ahuimanu pineapple farm in Kahaluu, Koolau, Oahu, Hawaii. Park Yong-man officially established the Korean National Army Corps served as the corps commander and Park Jong-su served as the battalion commander. Because it was located beyond Koolau Mountain, it was called ‘Sick School Beyond the Mountain.’. Other key figures of the military academy were Gyeong Jeong-go, Lee Ha-won, Kim Se-geun, Lee Jeong-gwon, Rik Yeong-cheon, Lim Eung-cheon, Han Tae-gyeong, Han Chi-un, and Lee Chi-young. They enabled the construction of a military camp capable of accommodating 300 to 400 people and the establishment of the North Korean National Corps and military academies. Lim Eung-cheon, Han Tae-kyung, and Han Chi-un donated profits from farming. By donating the entire amount to the corps, they actively supported the finances needed to establish the corps. Additionally, they served as key personnel and instructors after the establishment of the corps and military academy. Meanwhile, the Korean National Corps leased and operated a pineapple farm covering 1,500 acres in the Ahui Manu region to achieve financial independence.

=== Foundation ===
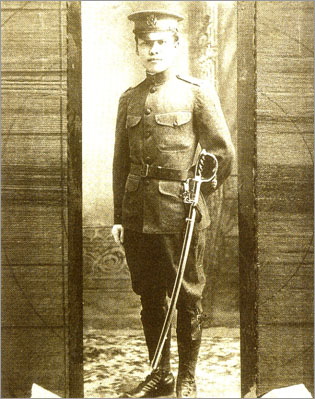
Park Yong-man, founder of the Korean National Army Corps

On June 10, military insignia were issued to over 100 residents who were employed in pineapple farming during the day, and the founding ceremony of the Korean National Corps was held. They began to accelerate preparations for the opening ceremony, wary of exposure to the outside world. On August 29, 1914, after the construction of the barracks was completed, they prepared the inauguration ceremony, a corps had to be organized in a military style. This is because the start of the semester was set as September 1. About 600 Koreans attended the ceremony. The number of young men who first enlisted in the Korean National Corps Military Academy was 103. Military education was conducted using wooden rifles and operated under the Dunjeonbyeong system (屯田兵制). In other words, soldiers belonging to the National Corps, in addition to military training, also farmed pineapples at the farms in their garrisons.

=== Japanese Consulate Investigation ===
The Japanese consulate in Honolulu continued to follow Park Yong-man's movements. In particular, he closely monitored the establishment of a military school that he was promoting. The rumor that Park Yong-man was planning to establish a military school was picked up by the Japanese consulate intelligence network within a few months of his arrival in Hawaii.

The Japanese consulate approached one of the trainees of the National Corps, Park Yong-man, who was trying to establish a military unit using Japanese residents as a liaison. According to what the trainee leaked, Yongman Park said this.

"The purpose of our National Corps cadets having to receive military training even during normal times is so that they can demonstrate their normal skills when the opportunity for national independence comes. And the United States and Japan cannot help but start a war someday. Hawaii is Japan. It is located in a strategically important place, and in case of emergency, we must act together with American soldiers. Since we are a yellow race like the Japanese, it is easy for us to serve as secret agents. Therefore, we learn Japanese in everyday life and are familiar with the situation in Japan. There must be."

— Park Yongman

Judging from Park Yong-man's remarks, it seems that starting military training in Hawaii was not necessarily with the intention of going to the border area of Joseon and waging an armed resistance. He predicted that someday the United States and Japan would engage in armed conflict in the Pacific. They said that they should use that opportunity to pursue Korea's independence by siding with the United States, and to prepare for it, they should hasten the establishment of the National Army. A confidential document sent by the Japanese Consulate to the Minister of Foreign Affairs of the country on March 30, 1914, contains the following information:

"The composition of the cadets at the military school is diverse. They include former soldiers, students, and workers from the end of the Joseon Dynasty. It is said that among the former workers, delinquent cadets became violent after becoming soldiers, leading to constant fights within the compound. Former students. "It is said that they focus more on their studies than working on farms because their purpose is to study. However, due to the inadequate facilities of educational institutions, there are quite a few who run away.""

— Japanese Consulate to the Minister of Foreign Affairs via confidential document.

As confirmed by the Japanese consulate, the Korean workers who originally arrived in Hawaii were of various classes. They were mainly members of the Methodist Church, students who wanted to study, local scholars who learned Chinese classics at a seodang, former Gwangmu soldiers, rural laborers, hard-earned workers, and gangsters who were idle. Their level of education was so low that 65% were illiterate. Therefore, it was not easy to bring them together.

The Japanese consulate reported that there were quite a few people fleeing, but according to Park Yong-man, it was at the level of a mass escape.

"Since last fall, more than a thousand people had planned to go there, but once they came and heard about the hardships, they all ran away without looking back, and only about a hundred people followed. Considering that they usually mean that, Park Jong-su, it is not strange that Mr. Lee Chi-kyung and other compatriots do their best to help.”

— Japanese Consulate to the Minister of Foreign Affairs via confidential document.

This was a confession made by Park Yong-man. There was a rumor going around among compatriots that a thousand people had flocked to the National Corps, $10,000 had been raised, and even a car had already been prepared, making the Japanese consulate recognized its true nature and designated it as a “military school” in the report.

=== Investigation ===
In the summer of 1915, the Japanese Embassy in the United States strongly protested to the U.S. Secretary of State about Park Yong-man's military activities. The U.S. Secretary of State requested a strict investigation by the Ministry of the Interior, and the Ministry of the Interior sent an official letter to the Governor of Hawaii, ordering him to investigate whether Park Yong-man and his followers possessed weapons and whether they were involved in or instigated Japan's internal affairs. After an investigation, the governor of Hawaii responded that Japan's claims were not true, but he could not continue to let the potential for chaos continue. In the end, the Hawaii Regional Assembly was deprived of its autonomy as the special police powers approved by the Hawaiian government were revoked. Externally, the inability to overcome operational problems, such as pressure from Japan due to changes in the international situation and the inability to attract support due to differences in the independence movement lines among Korean groups, also played a role. In particular, when World War I broke out, the international situation became favorable to Japan, which was an allied country based on the Anglo-Japanese Alliance at the time.

=== Decline ===
In 1915, Park Yong-man was in a state of deep conflict with Syngman Rhee, who had great influence on the Korean community and the Korean National Association at the time, due to differences in independence policies. Power has been passed to Rhee Syngman's.

In October 1916, the Korean National Corps moved to the coastal area of Kahuku, about 40 km north of Ahuimanu. The reason for moving the station was it was difficult to raise finances for the operation of the military camp as the operation based on the military-farm-unity system that pineapple farms suffered from poor harvests and recession, resulting in a decrease in income. As a result, the Korean National Army Corps, which had implemented a dull war system of unity between soldiers and farmers, faced great financial difficulties. Moreover, as it became impossible to renew the contract with the pineapple farm, there was no choice but to relocate. However, even after the military camp was relocated, the situation still did not improve.

=== Disbandment ===
Amid this chaos, the contract for the farm was canceled in 1916 due to pressure from farm owners and it could not be extended. The Korean National Corps was finally closed around 1917. As military activities in Hawaii declined, Park Yong-man organized the Hawaiian branch of the Korean Independence Movement in downtown Honolulu in March 1919 and then moved his activities to Beijing, China.

== Organization ==
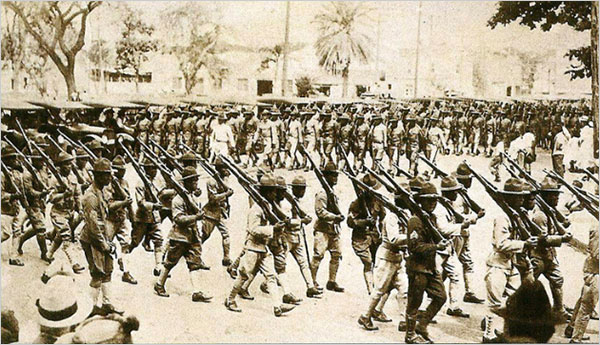
A street parade of the Korean National Army Corps

The Korean National Army Corps was an organization created to promote the Korean Independence Movement in the Korean American community by inheriting the military movement spirit of the Korean Child Soldier School started by Park Yong-man in Hastings, Nebraska in June 1909. This organization was formed with the purpose of organizing all Korean independence forces into the 'Great Korean National Corps'. Accordingly, the officers of the corps headquarters were the officers of the military academy, and the cadets of the military academy were members of the National Corps raised to fight for independence in Manchuria and Primorsky Krai. The organization and establishment of the National Corps was handled by the Training Department of the Hawaiian Regional General Assembly of the Korean National Association, which promoted military training in each region of Hawaii. The Korean National Army Corps held commemorative events and division ceremonies on February 1 every year, the founding anniversary of the Korean National Association and the inauguration ceremony of the Korean National Association as president.

Its core business was centered on training independent military officers through the establishment of a military school called 'Mountain Overseas Soldier School'. All matters related to the organization of the National Corps and the establishment of military academies are carried out. Although the military training department of the Hawaiian Regional General Assembly of the Korean National Association was in charge of continuing military training in various places, the leader who led this project was the corps commander. The organization consisted of a military academy, a command center, and subordinate departments. The organization, which started with about 100 people, grew to a maximum of 300 people.

=== Executives ===
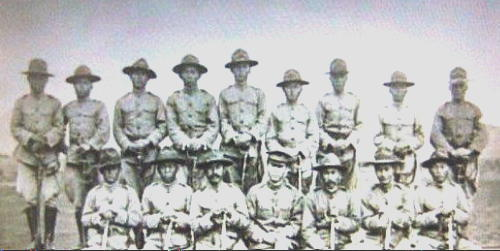
Korean National Army Corps Commanders

The organization and composition of the Korean National Army Corps and the Military Academy was a modern military organization that imitated the US Army. The organization and composition of the Korean National Army Corps consisted of the Corps Headquarters as the command center (commander Park Yong-man, adjutants Koo Jong-kwon and Tae Byeong-seon, secretary Baek Un-taek, Jang Jae Soon-seo). Under the headquarters were the corps accounting department (adjutants Noh Hoon and Park Seung-seon, accountant Lee Jeong-geun, bookkeeper Jeong In-su, military officer Hong Jong-hoon), uniform office (Platoon Commander Kim Seong-ok, Kim Seung-yoon), Military School (Commander Park Yong-man, Battalion Commander Park Jong-su, Battalion Adjutant Choi Jang-young, Preceptor Jeong Myeong-yeol), Training Center Battalion (Battalion Commander Park Jong-su, Adjutant Lee Du-hwan, Heo Yong), Training Center Company (Company Commander Kim Se-geun, Adjutant Lee Jeong-geun, Lieutenant Kim Chi-myeong, Cho) Bong-woon, Han Myeong-soo), training center platoon (Platoon leader Park Chun-sik, Kang Tae-sun, Han Eung-sun, Lieutenants Ahn Kyung-sik, Lee Sang-ho, Kim Rye-jun, Kim Seong-ok, Kim Yong-pal, Han Gyeong-seon, Lim Seong-woo, Jeon Jong-moon, Jeongjeong Bang Jae-sun, Lim Sun-yong, Kim Soon-geun, sergeants Kim Sang-ho, Yoon Hee-ju, Lee Tae-hong, Seo Sun-baek, Baek) Yoon Seo), Byeoldongdae (No Baek-rin, Kim Seong-ok, Heo Yong, Lee Bok-hee, Lee Sang-ho), singing hands (Lee Jae-ho, Kang Dal-je, Kang Un-hak, Kim Yong-hwan, Baek Un-kyung, Cha Seong-jeol), metal hands (Lee Chang-gyu, Lee Bong-yong, Kim Baek-hwa, Choi Tae-je, Kim Jung-hwan), etc., and the military band. Operating funds were provided by Koreans in Hawaii, and donations were also made from Koreans working at pineapple farms out of their labor contracts.

=== Curriculum ===
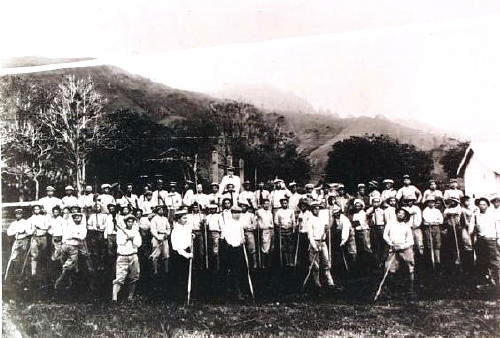
Members of the Korean National Army Corps worked at pineapple farms during the day.

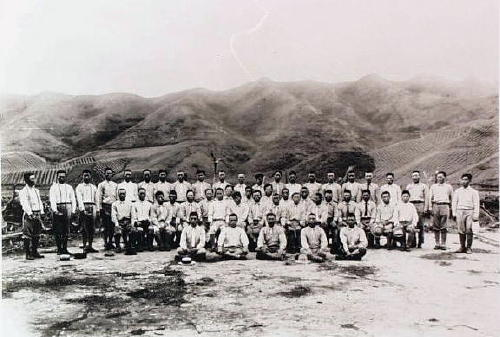
Corps members standing against the backdrop of a pineapple farm on the slopes of the Ko'olau Mountains.

The curriculum of this military academy was developed by Park Yong-man based on the curriculum of Hastings Korean Child Soldier School. They were required to wear military uniforms based on the U.S. Army style. There were 28 types of textbooks, one in particular was the ≪Soldier's Guide≫, translated and published by Park Yong-man in 1911, was used as a major textbook at military academies. Books such as 『National Opening of the Armed Forces』 and 『Soldier Balance』 written by Park Yong-man were used as teaching materials.

The students selected were approximately 17 to 35 years old. Of these, 75 were ‘Gwangmu Soldiers’, former soldiers of the Korean Empire. National Corps students woke up at 4 a.m., ate at 5 a.m., worked on the farm from 7 a.m., and participated in military training from 9 a.m. to 11 a.m. They worked on the farm from 1pm to 5pm and attended school from 7pm, combining work, study, and military training.

It was not easy for foreigners to set up a military camp and provide military training in Hawaii. Education was possible because the military command tolerated the Korean-Americans in consideration of their special political position. However, because the use of highly lethal firearms was prohibited, military training was conducted using wooden guns, and the operation of the corps was based on the principle of a gun-to-arms system. The military academies were also called ‘soldier academies,’ where soldiers stayed in the corps, received military training and study, and at the same time went out to work on farms, while also conducting military training and learning in their spare time. The corps students received military training outdoors and studied military science in the classroom. It was a method of receiving training and learning while boarding in the corps, forming groups, and going to the farm to work.

== Legacy ==
The martial spirit of the Korean National Army Corps continued to be passed on to the Korean Independence Corps by Park Yong-man. The exact location of the Korean National Army Corps and Military Academy site has not been historically researched or confirmed to date. However, the Ahui Manu area, where the Korean National Corps was founded, has now been transformed into a private residential complex, and the Kahuku area, where it was relocated in 1916, is home to a wildlife protection area and a power plant. There were 8 types of soldier's notebooks and 17 photos showcased at the Independence Hall of Korea in Cheonan, South Chungcheong Province, South Korea. Among the notebooks, the 'Soldier's Riding Grade Record Book for Army Institutions' contains information on soldiers' riding procedures and morals and discipline within the military. There are also 53 trumpet tunes played by the military band of the corps, the flag of the Korean National League, and a notebook containing gymnastics commands. There were also notebooks containing detailed information such as the military internal affairs department book, security service book, and military personnel balance. In addition, the handwritten note of teacher Park Jong-su.

== See also ==
- Korean National Association
- Korean Americans
  - List of Korean Americans
- Korean Independence Movement
  - List of militant Korean independence activist organizations
- Willows Korean Aviation School
- Sinhan Minbo
