= Willows Korean Aviation School =

1920–1921 Korean independence organization

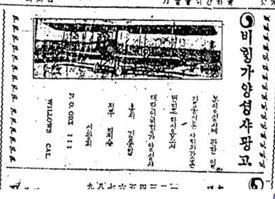
- An advertisement for the school

Location
- Glenn County, California; United States
- Coordinates: 39.5185°N 122.1106°W

Information
- Established: February 20, 1920
- Closed: 1921
- Affiliation: Korean National Association

Taegeuk served as a roundel for training planes such as the Standard J-1.

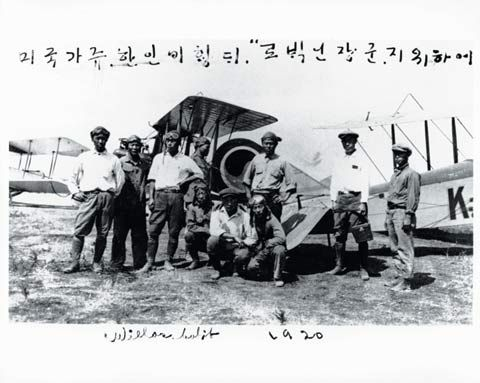
Willows Flight School in the 1920s.

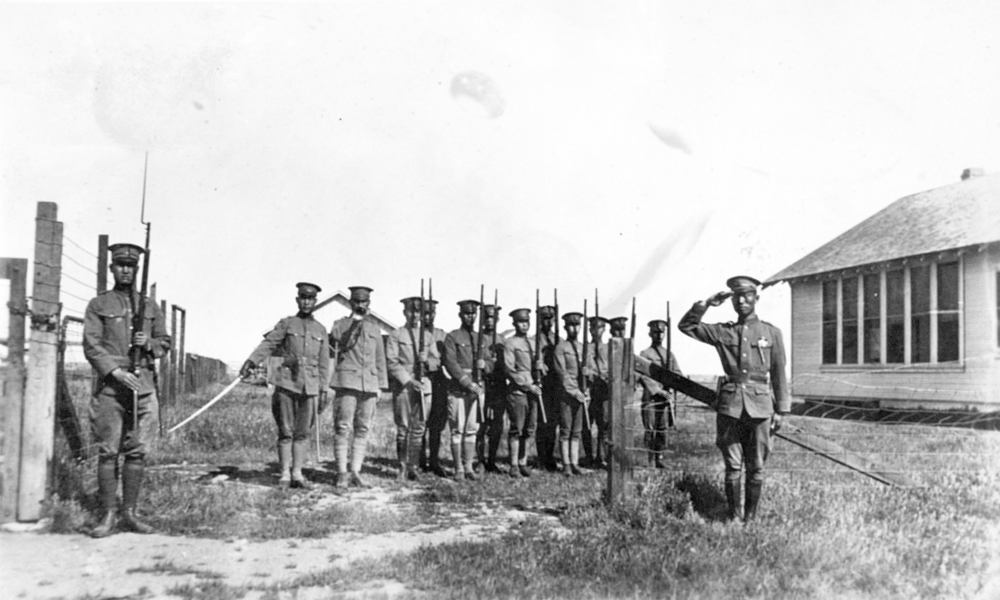
Flight school students standing at attention.

Willows Korean Aviation School (Korean: 대한인비행가양성소; Hanja: 大韓人飛行家養成所) was an aviation school meant to train fighter pilots for the Korean Independence Movement, many of whom were members of the Korean National Association. It was established on February 20, 1920 in Glenn County, California, by Korean-Americans and backed by the Korean Provisional Government in Shanghai. It was disestablished in April 1921.

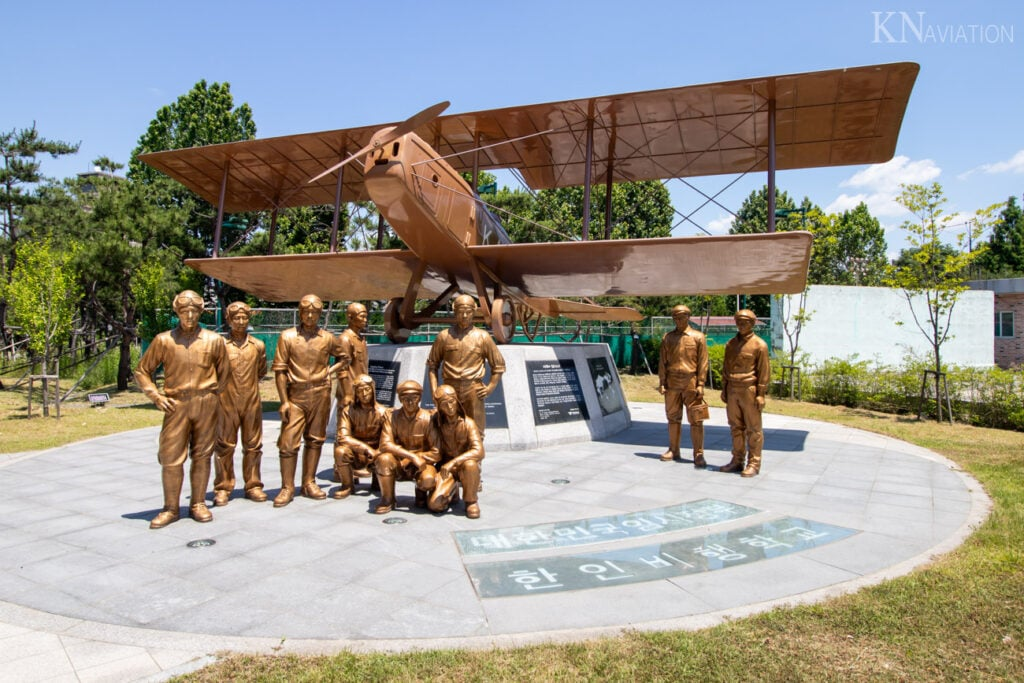
Memorial at National Aviation Museum in Korea that honors the pilots from the Willows Aviation School in California

The choice for a Korean Aviation School to be established in California was for multiple reasons including the March 1st movement, interest and financial support from the Korean American community, the impact of World War I on aviation for combat and defensive purposes, and Japan's inability to control or influence the school on US soil.

Lee Jae-su was a co-founder and treasurer of the aviation school. In recognition of his contributions to Korea's independence movement, Lee Jae-su, originally buried in Maxwell, California, was posthumously reinterred in South Korea in 2019. Shortly before his death, Lee wrote a personal manifesto addressed to his children, imploring them to continue his efforts to rebuild a free and independent Korea.

The financial support for the Willows Korean Aviation School largely came from the first Korean-American millionaire Kim Chong Lim, until his fortune was lost when a disastrous flood in October 1920 destroyed his rice fields.

Although the school lasted for a little over a year, it had gained a lot of attention and trained many of the pioneers of Korean aviation, including Park Hee-sung, Lee Yong-keun, and Song Yi-kyun. Two of its graduates went on to join the Republic of Korea Air Force, which recognizes the Willows Korean Aviation School as its predecessor.

== See also ==
- History of Korea
- Provisional Government of Republic of Korea
- Korean independence movement
  - List of militant Korean independence activist organizations
- Korean National Association
- Sinhan Minbo

== Bibliography ==
- Chang, Edward T.; Han, Woo Sung (2015). Korean American Pioneer Aviators: The Willows Airmen. Lexington Books. ISBN 978-1-4985-0265-8.
- Miller, B. (2015, July 9). Willows Korean Aviation School Fueled Independence Movement. Retrieved from https://ucrtoday.ucr.edu/30192
- Koreans To Have Aviation Field (1920, June 14) Willows Daily Journal. Retrieved from http://digitallibrary.usc.edu/cdm/ref/collection/p15799coll126/id/5716
- Koreans To Train Aviators here to Fight the Japs (1920, March 1). Willows Daily Journal. Retrieved from http://digitallibrary.usc.edu/cdm/ref/collection/p15799coll126/id/5716
- Koreans Aviation School to Be Seen in Movies (n.d.). Willows Daily Journal. Retrieved from http://digitallibrary.usc.edu/cdm/ref/collection/p15799coll126/id/5716
