= Park Yong-man =

Korean independence activist (1881–1928)

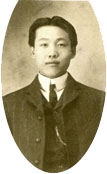
- Born: 2 July 1881; Cheorwon, Gangwon, Joseon dynasty, Korea
- Died: 17 October 1928 (aged 47); Beijing, Republic of China

Korean name
- Hangul: 박용만
- Hanja: 朴容萬
- RR: Bak Yongman
- MR: Pak Yongman

Park Yong-man (Korean: 박용만; 2 July 1881 – 17 October 1928) was a Korean nationalist and independence activist who, after spending time in prison for reformist activities, immigrated to the United States of America. There Park was involved in the establishment of various Korean nationalist organizations in Denver, Nebraska and Hawaii. Park also founded the Korean National Army Corps. Following the March 1st Movement in 1919, Park became involved with the military training of Korean nationalists in China, but may have also engaged in anti-communist activity. Park was assassinated in Beijing by a Korean communist.

== Early life ==
Park was born on 2 July 1881 in Cheorwon, a rural town in Gangwon province to a family with military traditions. After the death of his parents in his early childhood, Park was raised by his uncle, Park Hee-Byung. Together with his uncle, Park moved to Seoul, and then to Japan. He developed reformist leanings while in Japan, and upon his return to Korea, around 1897, became involved with various reformist and protest movements. His activities were frowned upon by the government and Park was imprisoned.

It was while he was incarcerated that he met Syngman Rhee, another reformist. Rhee was working on a book, "The Spirit of Independence", a treatise on reform and patriotism. Park assisted Rhee in the writing of his book, and smuggled the manuscript out of prison upon his release around 1903. His uncle had by now returned to Korea, and Park joined him in Sonchon, in what is now North Korea, and worked at a private school. In late 1904 or early 1905, Park emigrated to the United States of America.

== Emigration to the U.S. ==
=== Life in Nebraska ===
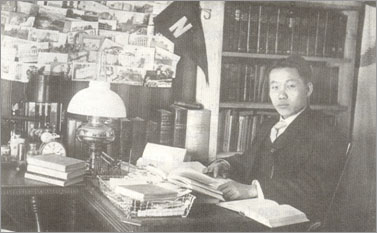
Park Yong-man in his dormitory at the University of Nebraska

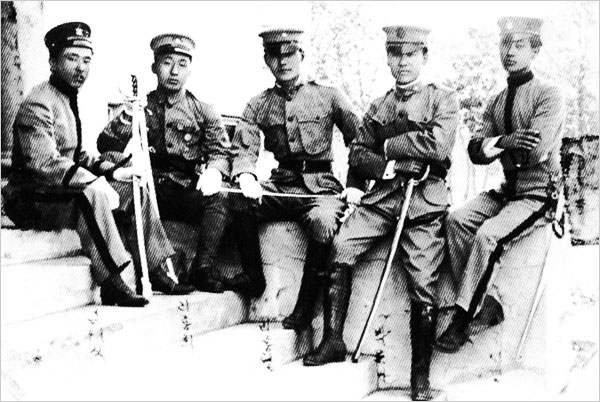
Teachers and students of the Youth Military School in Hastings, Nebraska, with Park Yong-man on the center-left.

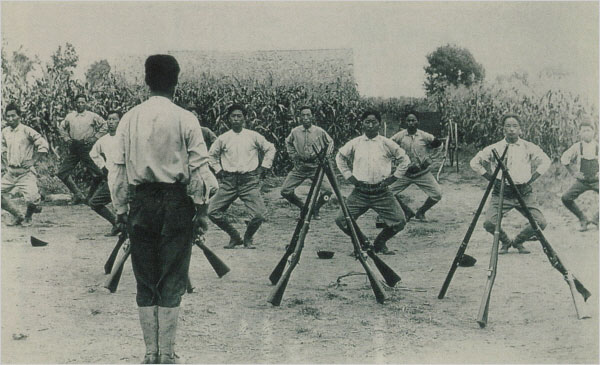
Students undergoing military training at the Hastings Youth Military School

Initially settling in Nebraska, Park was a student at the Hastings College. He then moved to Denver, Colorado to again join his uncle, who had also moved to the United States and was one of the first Korean immigrants to live in Denver. Together with his uncle, Park helped organise a Korean nationalist network in Denver. However, when his uncle was assassinated in 1907, Park subsequently returned to Nebraska, this time to Lincoln to study political and military science at the University of Nebraska.

By June 1909, and now recognized as one of the leaders of the Korean-American community, Park established a military school in Kearney, Nebraska. Park was a firm believer in military action against Japan in order to achieve an independent Korea, and such action clearly required trained fighters. With his school, he aimed to provide young Korean-Americans with military drills and training for the anticipated clash with Japan. History, English, Korean and even agriculture were also taught to students.

By 1910, Park was dabbling in journalism and was editor of the Korean newspaper The New Korea (신한민보) published by the recently established Korean National Association (KNA) in San Francisco. Syngman Rhee, by now released from prison and living in the United States, was asked to take over Park's military school, which had shifted from Kearney to Hastings, Nebraska. Upon his arrival, Rhee was highly critical of the school and only stayed a short time before departing. The school eventually was closed in 1915.

=== Life in Hawaii ===
The KNA had one of its two headquarters in Hawaii, the other being in San Francisco, and Park served as its vice-chairman for a time. This necessitated a move to Honolulu in 1912, and he continued his editorial work at the Korean National Herald.

Also while in Hawaii, as Park still considered that a military confrontation with Japan was likely, he established the Korean National Army Corps. A firm believer in the use of military force to secure independence for Korea,

==== Park Yong-man's Korean National Army Corps Articles ====
Park Yong-man wanted more compatriots to join the National Corps. He advertised in an article in the National Newspaper that he would not stop those who still come and would accept them if they meet the qualifications. And although collective farm life is hard, it is also not without fun, he wrote. He added that about 100 residents are finding joy in the midst of hardship by seeing the sights they saw at the Hwanghakjeong Training Center in Seoul and hearing the sounds they heard from the Three Military Branches.

The creation of the National Corps, which had a gestation period of almost a year, began its labor pains only on April 12. That day, Jongsu Park’s farm stopped working. All work was closed and a simple ceremony was held with ordinary compatriots gathered. An announcement ceremony was held to announce the decision to establish a national corps. At 12:30 noon, the owner of the farm and some of Honolulu's leading figures were invited to a luncheon.

From that day on, Yongman Park’s work became very busy. Even if his body was split into ten pieces, he couldn't handle it.

"The president of Dong-A Ilbo has been unable to answer even half of the letters he has received since New Year's Day, and has been unable to answer even half of the letters he has received since New Year's Day, as night replaces day, and night replaces day, and eating and clothing are timeless. After pouring into this work (establishing the National Corps) and putting it in order, I intend to begin the round trip." His strong stamina and strong spirit are always strong, and his body and mind do not appear to be overly damaged, but he is in good shape. Ming members ask for food, they ask for side dishes, they ask for shoes, they ask for clothes, and when they come into a newspaper office, the printers at the press office even ask for editorials and telegrams. Hundreds of requests come in, but there is not one thing, so they cannot respond to them one by one. But I endure it with my body, and this is something that we bystanders are very embarrassed about. I don't know. In which sky does not rain money come? (sigh)

— May 16th ‘Kookminbo’ article written by Park Yong-man

Moon Yang-mok was a person who served as a Seodang Order of Merit in Incheon in 1903 and came to Hawaii in 1905 to apply for recruitment of sugar cane workers. In 1911, he was elected as the president of the North American Korean National Association, and the following year, he served as editor-in-chief of ‘Shinhan Minbo’. His commentary on the creation of the Korean National Army Corps was published in the June 3, 1914 issue of Kukminbo.

"(Strategy) In just a few decades, our people will no longer be able to hear the term martial arts or military strategy. Due to the chronic nature of the original civil law, the mere sight of the shadow of swords and guns will frighten and frighten them, so they will write a declaration and declare independence. Who can build a strong physique and give courage to our people, who have lost their freedom and lost all their rights? This is the same policy that responsible leaders want to take first, considering it to be an urgent task. ( (omitted)

Fortunately, an opportunity arose in Hawaii, and the president of Kookminbo raised a nimble and mature hand and called, and the Joseon men who had spirit and spirit came out in groups of three and five, which was the "crossing the mountain" that had already begun. It's work.

However, there is a question that those who think about "going over the mountain" by guessing from what they hear do not know in detail, and whether they are making some big preparations here tomorrow, such as raising sand, beating flags, beating drums, and creating great equipment to make a fuss. There is nothing. It seems like they want to know in vain whether they are making no actual preparations and are only making a futile fuss as if they can do something, and after only a year or two, they end up being stuck in the Hawaiian wind without a trace, regardless of merit or filial piety.

To put it simply, it is similar to a school system. As mentioned above, each leader began here the work that he had not been able to test because he did not get the opportunity, and here he puts into practice what the general public wants. Therefore, the hopes of all our people are also important and urgent, and all eyes are on the table. Regarding this, it strikes me like the speed of electricity, but if I take this opportunity to discuss it, it did not happen by chance. The president of Kookminbo wasted infinite effort and energy and was extremely devoted to helping himself, so he started with God's help. However, our hope was not achieved. As you can see, if you want to achieve good results, how can you say it is easy? (In short) "

— Park Yongman, June 3, 1914 issue of Kukminbo

The reason the creation of the National Corps was described as a "crossing the mountain" work was because a military school was established in Ahuimanu across the Ko'olau Mountains. Compatriots living in Honolulu called the corps members "across the mountain, Ahees." However, Japan The consulate recognized its true nature and designated it as a “military school” in the report.

=== Shutting down the Korean National Army Corps ===
Park gradually fell out with Syngman Rhee and others in the KNA, who favored a more diplomatic solution to Korea's annexation by Japan. There were also clashes over funding, with Rhee preferring the available funds collected from the Korean-American community to be spent on education rather than maintaining the Korean Military Corps. The funding issue became problematic, and the Corps was shut down in 1917 because of this.

Back in Korea, opposition to Japanese rule was increasing, and following the 1 March 1919 uprising which resulted in the Declaration of Independence, Park translated the Declaration into English for publication in Honolulu. Then, in May 1919, Park joined the American Expeditionary Force, which was embarking for Siberia.

== Return to Asia ==
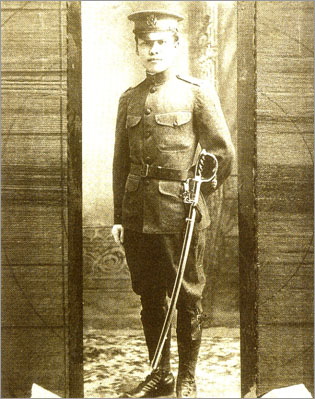
Park Yong-man in military uniform

The American Expeditionary Force had been dispatched to Siberia in 1918 to assist the Czechoslovak Legions in their retreat from the Bolsheviks during the Russian Civil War. Japanese forces were also present in the region, nominally to assist in fighting the Bolsheviks, but also as part of a process to expand their influence in North East Asia. Consequently, Park appears to have considered his sojourn to Siberia as an ideal start to combating Japanese colonialism. His role with the American Expeditionary Force was as an intelligence officer, and it is likely that he collected information on the communist Koreans present in Siberia at the time.

In the interim, three separate Korean Provisional Governments (KPG) had been established, one each in Seoul, Vladivistok and Shanghai. By September 1919, these had merged into a single government in Shanghai, with Syngman Rhee (in absentia) appointed as president. Park was offered the position of Minister of Foreign Affairs in the Provisional Government. Park, having finished his duties with the American Expeditionary Force, arrived in Shanghai in March 1920. However, it seems that Park was only part of the KPG for a few months, if at all. It is possible that the selection of Syngman Rhee as head of the KPG was a factor in deterring Park from playing a more significant role with the organisation.

Park was also involved with negotiations to form a secret mutual defense pact between the newly established KPG and the Soviets. Park was now based in Manchuria, spending time training recruits and preparing for a military campaign against Japan. Little is known about his activities in Manchuria, but he returned to Korea at least once, in 1924, with a group of military and business leaders of the pro-Japanese Chinese government. Park, now under suspicion of collaborating with the Japanese against communism due to his activities in Siberia and Manchuria, was assassinated in Beijing on 17 October 1928 by a Korean communist, Lee Hae-young.

== See also ==
- History of Korea
- Korean independence movement
  - List of militant Korean independence activist organizations
- Sinhan Minbo
- Korean National Army Corps
