= Korean National Association =

American political organization (1909–)

- Founded: 1 February 1909
- Founder: Ahn Changho
- Type: Political organization
- Location: San Francisco, California (before 1936) Los Angeles, California, U.S. (after 1936)
- Subsidiaries: Korean National Army Corps; Willows Korean Aviation School

- Korean National Association
- Hangul: 대한인국민회
- Hanja: 大韓人國民會
- Revised Romanization: Daehanin Gungminhoe
- McCune–Reischauer: Taehanin Kungminhoe

The Korean National Association (Korean: 대한인국민회; Hanja: 大韓人國民會), also known as All Korea Korean National Association, was a political organization established on February 1, 1909, to fight Japan's colonial policies and occupation in Korea. It was founded in San Francisco by the intellectual scholar and Korean Independence activist Ahn Changho, and represented the interests of Koreans in the United States, Russian Far East, and Manchuria during the Korean Independence Movement.

== Background ==
Flag of Korean National Association (Seong-Mun Choi faction)

After the Japan–Korea Treaty of 1905, multiple local and statewide Korean organizations emerged in Hawaii, California, and other parts of the US condemning Japan's colonial policies. However, on March 23, 1908, after the pro-Japanese diplomat, Durham White Stevens, was assassinated by two Korean immigrants, Korean organizations in both Hawaii and the US mainland joined together to protect the rights of the two alleged assailants. This event and the growing need to consolidate patriotic efforts led to two major Korean civic organizations, the Mutual Assistance Society (MAS) in San Francisco and the United Korean Society in Hawaii, to organize a meeting on October 30, 1908, to discuss the unification of both groups. Seven representatives from Hawaii and six representatives of the mainland US agreed, and both organizations officially merged to form the KNA on February 1, 1909.

== Earlier years ==
Following its establishment, the KNA began with two regional headquarters in Hawaii and San Francisco, and expanded its activities by sending delegates to other regions to establish additional chapters. By 1911, the KNA had expanded to four key regions: North America, Hawaii, Siberia, and Manchuria.

To reflect its geographic expansion, the Korean National Association changed its name to All Korea Korean National Association. Each regional headquarters administered over local chapters, and at the organization's peak, there would be nearly 130 including 38 chapters in Hawaii and 73 chapters in North America.

On November 8, 1912, representatives coming from all regional headquarters met in San Francisco for an All Koreans Conference to establish a KNA central headquarters. It would serve as a central administrative office to ensure uniformity of rules across all chapters and to direct Korean independence movement activities. Ahn Changho and Park Yong-man were elected as the organization's chairman and vice chairman. As the leader of the central body, Ahn continued his work organizing KNA regional branches and further strengthening and unifying the organization. Though becoming more centralized, there remained conflicting interests between key leaders in Hawaii and North America. For example, Syngman Rhee looked for liberation through education and diplomacy, while Park Yong-man preferred military action. Ahn Changho went to Hawaii to mediate between the two leaders but with little success.

As an organization declaring its service as a legitimate governing body for the interests and well-being of Koreans, its state functionings was put to the test on June 13, 1914, when a group of Korean Americans working at an apricot farm in Hemet, California was attacked by local citizens who didn't want Asians working in that area. Initially, the Japanese consulate interceded with the government on behalf of the Korean Immigrants but that caused outrage within the Korean-American community. David Lee, the president of the North American branch of the KNA, sent a telegram to the US Secretary of state William Jennings Bryan, requesting that the Japanese government no longer represent Koreans. Despite the pressures from Japanese diplomats in Washington DC, Bryan ruled in the KNA's favor. Ever since, matters regarding the Korean immigrants or students would be handled by the KNA instead.

== March 1st Movement ==
The March 1st Movement in 1919 rekindled the national spirit of Korean-Americans. When news of the demonstrations reached the US in mid-March, a mass rally was held by the KNA in San Francisco. The KNA first attempted to send a three-man delegation including Syngman Rhee to the Paris Peace Conference but failed to receive necessary travel documentation. Afterwards, the KNA decided to establish a Korean Information Office headed by Philip Jaisohn then send him and Syngman Rhee to Philadelphia to lead "the Korean Congress" held from April 14 to 16 of the same year to begin blueprinting the future Republic of Korea with 150 Koreans representing 27 organizations in the US and Mexico. All organizations agreed upon a Korean republic based on democratic principles and pledged their support to the newly established Korean Provisional Government (KPG) in Shanghai. Ahn Changho, who was in Shanghai at that time, played an instrumental role in the government's establishment on April 13 and its early operations. After its formation, Syngman Rhee felt that the KNA fulfilled its goals and should let the government‐in‐exile lead the cause. Therefore, he proposed that the KNA rename itself to the Korean Residence Association which KNA members firmly rejected. This caused a factional split and the founding of The Comrade Society in Hawaii by Syngman Rhee and his supporters. Despite internal conflicts, the spike in activity within the KNA continued on until the mid-1920s when it lost its steam in the liberation movement and would not regain it until the Sino-Japanese War in 1937. However, the KNA continued to launch independence funds which for the following decades collected money from Korean immigrants to financially support the provisional government and anti-Japanese activities.

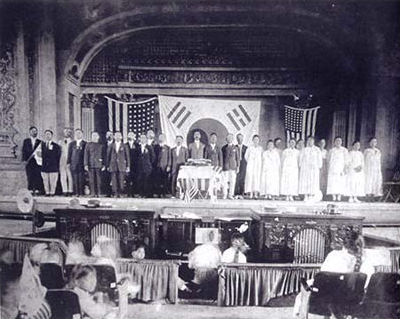
1915 people's association annual convention

== World War II ==
In 1936, the Korean National Association relocated its central headquarters to Los Angeles where it continued its independence activity and communication with the US government on behalf of Koreans. By that year, the KNA had become the largest Korean immigrant political organization and a key source of resistance and political empowerment, primarily through unifying the efforts of Korean immigrants and lobbying allied governments. However, the Hawaiian and North American branch of the KNA was becoming increasingly divided due to internal conflicts. It wasn't until internal reforms under KNA chairman Charles Kim and the arrival of World War II that the KNA branches united to join with other organizations such as Comrade Society to form the United Korean Committee. This alliance continued providing support for the KPG and aimed to receive official recognition of the KPG as the government of Korea.

== Since liberation ==
After Korea's liberation from Japan, the KNA continued its supportive efforts for the Republic of Korea through relief efforts while promoting cultural, educational, and religious activities in Korean-American communities. The organization continued to serve the Korean-American community in the US until dissolving in 1988. After later restoration work, the KNA's former headquarter building in Los Angeles was converted into a Korean Independence Memorial Building to educate the public on Korean American history and the organization's work. In recognition of its part in shaping Korean American history, in 1991, the city of Los Angeles declared the building as a historical landmark.

== Organizational media ==
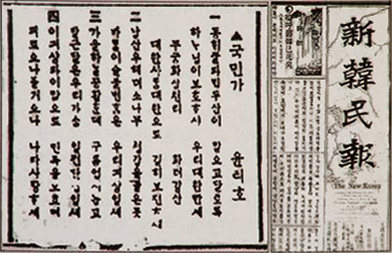
1910 issue of The New Korea (Sinhan Minbo)

On February 10, 1910, the KNA published the weekly newspaper Sinhan Minbo (신한민보), or The New Korea. Every Wednesday it published articles promoting the independence movement and advocating the interests of the Korean people. After World War II, it continued publishing weekly until being acquired by Kim Un Ha in September 1974 and published monthly instead.

== See also ==
- Korean Independence Movement
- History of Korea
- March 1st Movement
