= Sinhan Minbo =

1909–c.1980 Korean American newspaper

The New Korea
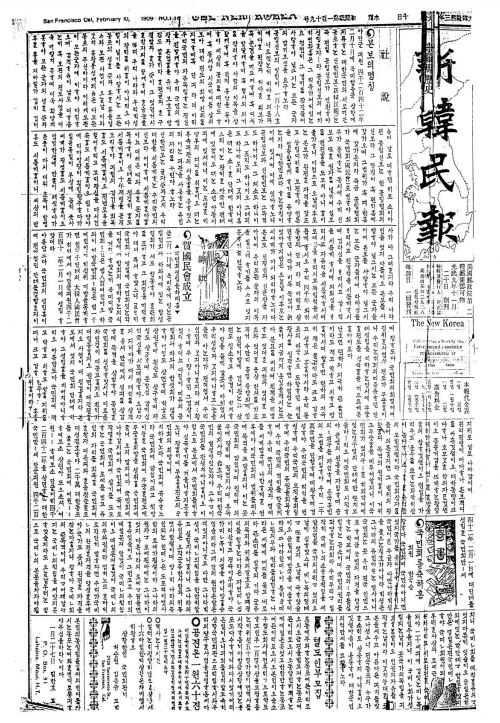
- Cover of the first issue
- Type: Weekly (1909–1974); Monthly (1974–late 1980s)
- Format: Broadsheet
- Founder: Korean National Association
- Founded: February 10, 1909; 116 years ago
- Ceased publication: Late 1980s
- Language: Korean
- Headquarters: San Francisco, California, United States

- Sinhan Minbo
- Hangul: 신한민보
- Hanja: 新韓民報
- RR: Sinhan minbo
- MR: Sinhan minbo

Sinhan Minbo (Korean: 신한민보; Hanja: 新韓民報) or The New Korea was a Korean language newspaper published in the United States. It was founded on February 10, 1909 by the Korean National Association (KNA) and published weekly from San Francisco. The newspaper became a vital part in promoting nationalism amongst Korean immigrant communities and spreading news on the issue of Korean independence. It would be the most influential and longest lasting newspaper for Korean Immigrants in the US. It ceased publication around the late 1980s.

== History ==
Nine days after the formal establishment of the KNA on February 1, 1909, the organization launched a newspaper which they would name Sinhan Minbo or The New Korea in English. It would replace the first Korean language paper Konglip Sinbo (The United Korean) and its competing paper, Taedong Kongbo (The New Korean World). As the main organ of the organization, it aimed to revitalize the spirit and commitment of all Korean People towards its goals. It was funded by the Mutual Assistance Society, one of two key organizations that merged to form the KNA. Its publication location was near the KNA's Headquarters in San Francisco, and weekly circulation was approximately 3000, with 700 to 800 distributed throughout the mainland US, 500 to 600 distributed throughout Hawaii, 300 to 400 throughout Mexico, and the rest throughout Siberia and Manchuria. Although it initially influenced readers in some parts of Korea in its first year, it was rarely distributed there after 1910 due to censorship following Japan's annexation of Korea. At its peak, it had 33 outlets, including a sales outlet located in Siberia.

The first publisher and editor was Choi Jung Ik until May 14, 1910, when Lee Hwan-woo took his place. Publication was suspended between November 1912 and June 1913. Lee Hwan-woo attempted to establish an English-language column but poor management resulted in Choi Jung-ik taking charge of editing once again. On March 11, 1915, KNA member Lee Daewi invented the first Korean typesetting machines to print the newspapers.

The title of the newspaper was written on the map of Korea with its name Sinhan Minbo in Chinese characters (Hanja) "新韓民報". In 1925, a new design with Korean letters (Hangul)ㅅㅣㄴㅎㅏㄴㅁㅣㄴㅂㅗ (신한민보) was developed but only lasted until 1929 when it returned to its original design once again. Like other Korean newspapers of its time, it employed vertical writing and was read from right to left.

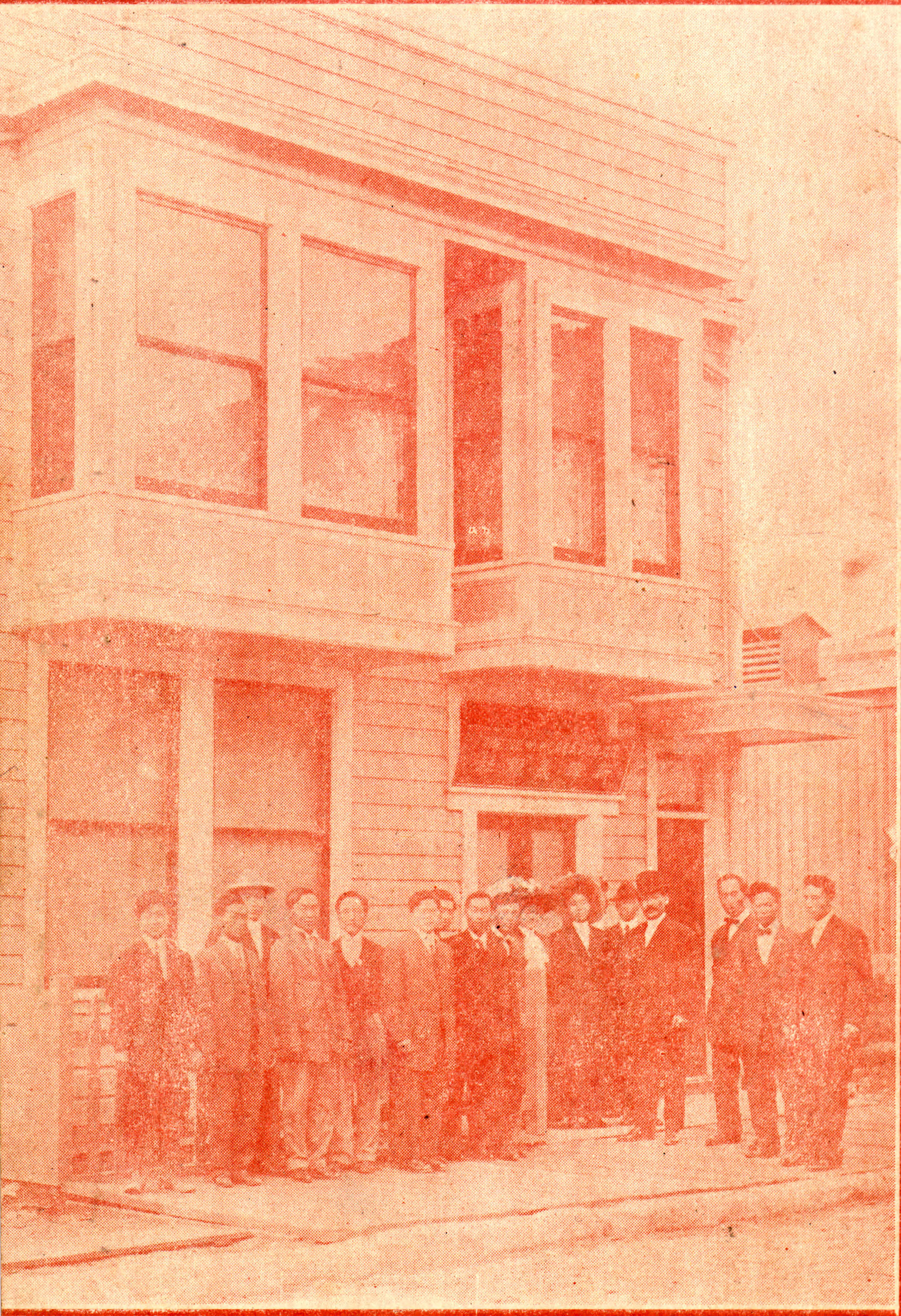
Sinhan Minbo offices, San Francisco

The articles between 1910 and World War II were mainly related to Korean liberation, but also included social and political issues of Koreans living abroad. In its first issue, it explained that as a newspaper for an organization representing all Koreans, it promises that compared with the previous two Korean language newspapers, it would provide a broader scope of news and impartial views. In the same year of its establishment, the independence activist Park Yong-man began a year of journalism work there and would publish an article titled "On a Universal Draft System, " which stressed that military service for Korean liberation was a patriotic duty. Between 1937 and 1946, Sinhan Minbo reserved the fourth page for an English section edited by the Young Korean National Association (YKNA). The articles mainly targeted younger readers, especially second generation Korean Americans. From 1937 to 1940, the independence activist Philip Jaisohn contributed to English columns such as "My Days in Korea" and "Random Thoughts".

During the year when the March 1st Movement took place, the newspaper began publishing every two days in order to quickly update domestic news to Korean Americans. After that year, it returned to publishing weekly until September 1974, when it was acquired by Woon Ha Kim (김운하; 金雲夏), the grandson of former president of the newspaper Harry S. Kim (김형순; 金衡珣). It was published monthly in Los Angeles.

Kim continued publishing the newspaper until he effectively stopped in the late 1980s. In April 1988, Kim became a travel agent specializing in North Korea, and later eventually moved to Austria. On 5 October 2019, Kim received a Civil Merit Medal from the Moon Jae-in administration for his work in journalism and advocacy for Korean reunification. However, he has been subject to several controversies over the years, including one incident involving items taken from the Sinhan Minbo offices and several based on the perceived degree of his sympathy for North Korea.

== See also ==
- Tongnip Sinmun
- History of Korea
- Provisional Government of Republic of Korea
- Korean independence movement
- Korean National Association
- The New Korea Times

== Bibliography ==
- Kyu, P. (1996) 신한민보(in Korean). In Encyclopedia of Korean Culture. Retrieved http://encykorea.aks.ac.kr/Contents/Index?contents_id=E0033529
- 서범석 (2017) 신한민보(新韓民報)의 광고에 대한 연구 The Korean Journal Advertising 23(6), 55~71. Retrieved from http://kja.koads.or.kr/article.asp?code=307372&mode=past&year=2017&issue=22833&searchType=&searchValue=&page=1
- Kim, Han. K. (2002). The Korean Independence Movement in the United States. International Journal of Korean Studies, 6(1),1-27. Retrieved from http://icks.org/data/ijks/1482456493_add_file_1.pdf
- 신한민보 (n.d.). In National Institute Of Korean History. Retrieved from http://contents.history.go.kr/front/tg/view.do?treeId=0203&levelId=tg_004_1710&ganada=&pageUnit=10
- Kim, R. (2011)The Quest for Statehood: Korean Immigrant Nationalism and U.S. Sovereignty, 1905–1945. New York, Oxford University Press. 42–43. Print
