= List of leaders of South Korea =

South Korean leaders

Presidential standard and seal of the president of the Republic of Korea
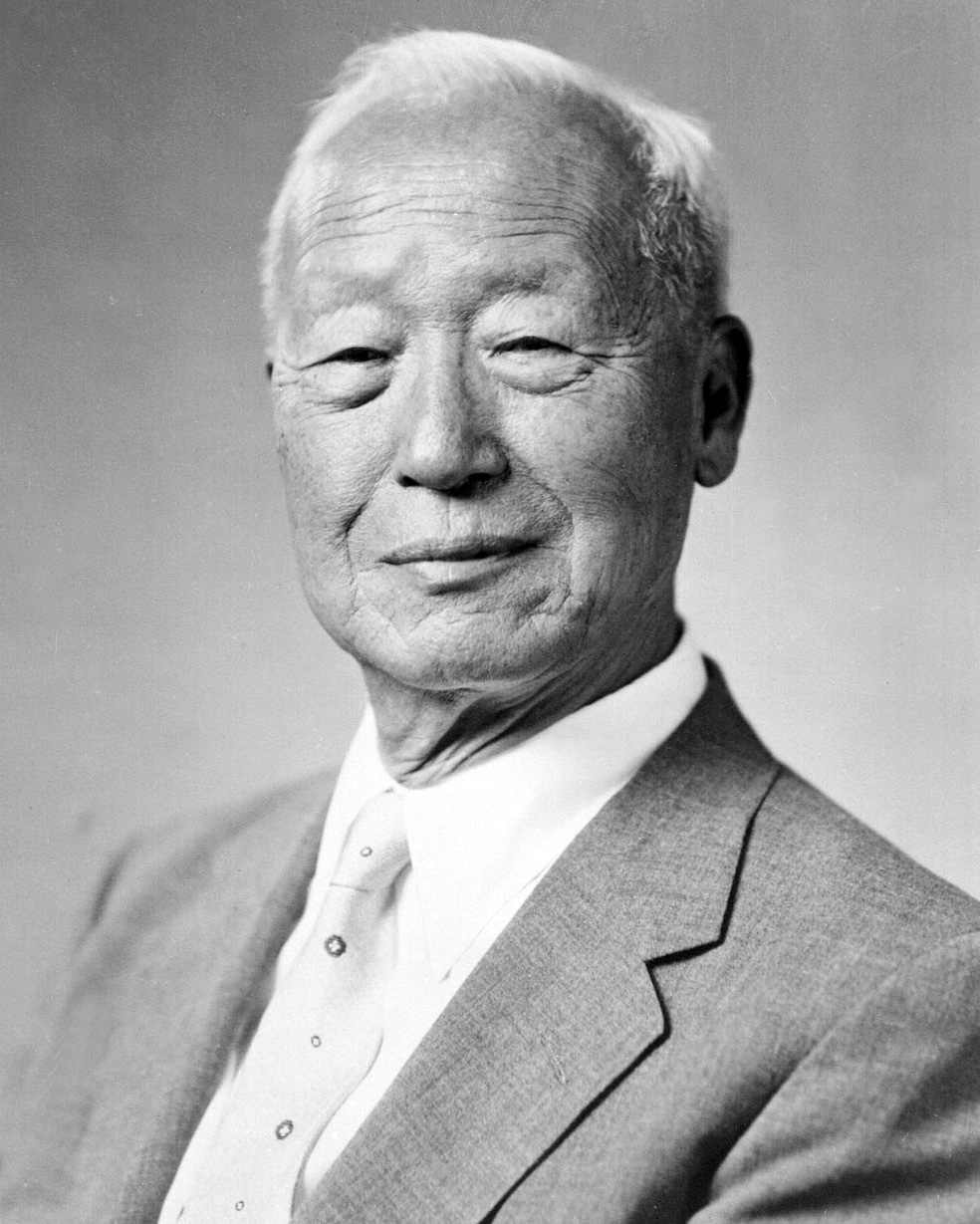
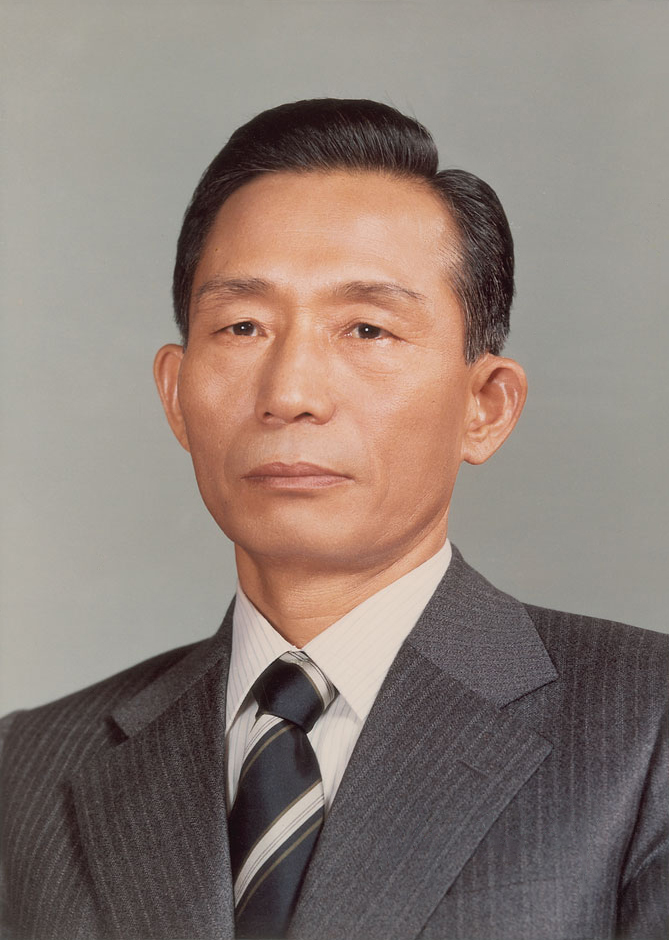
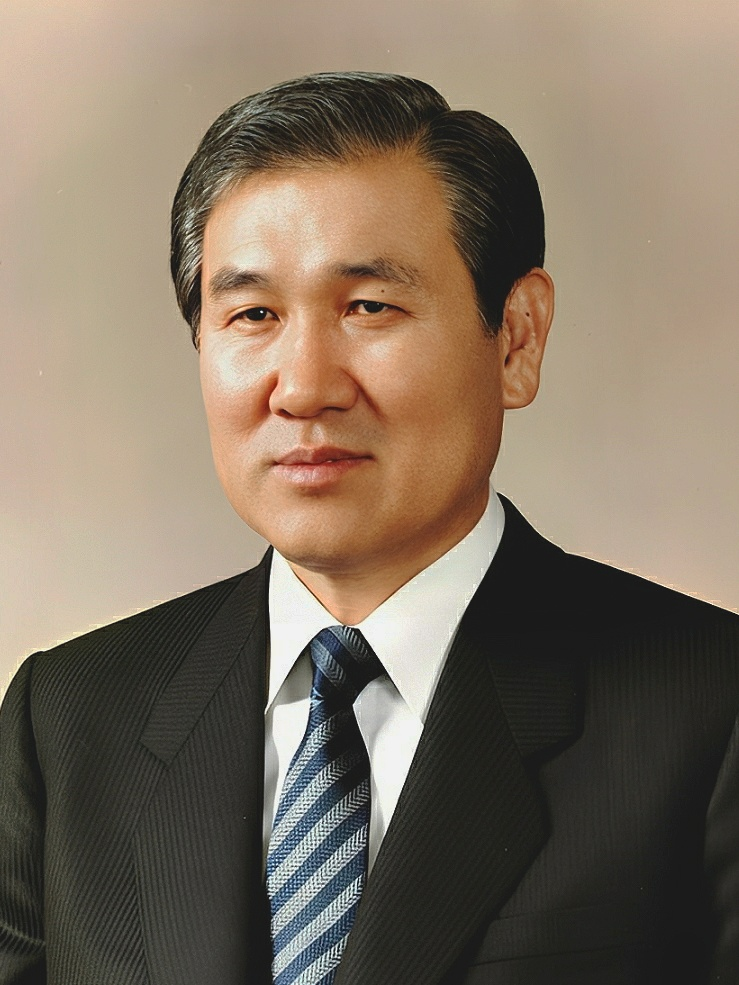
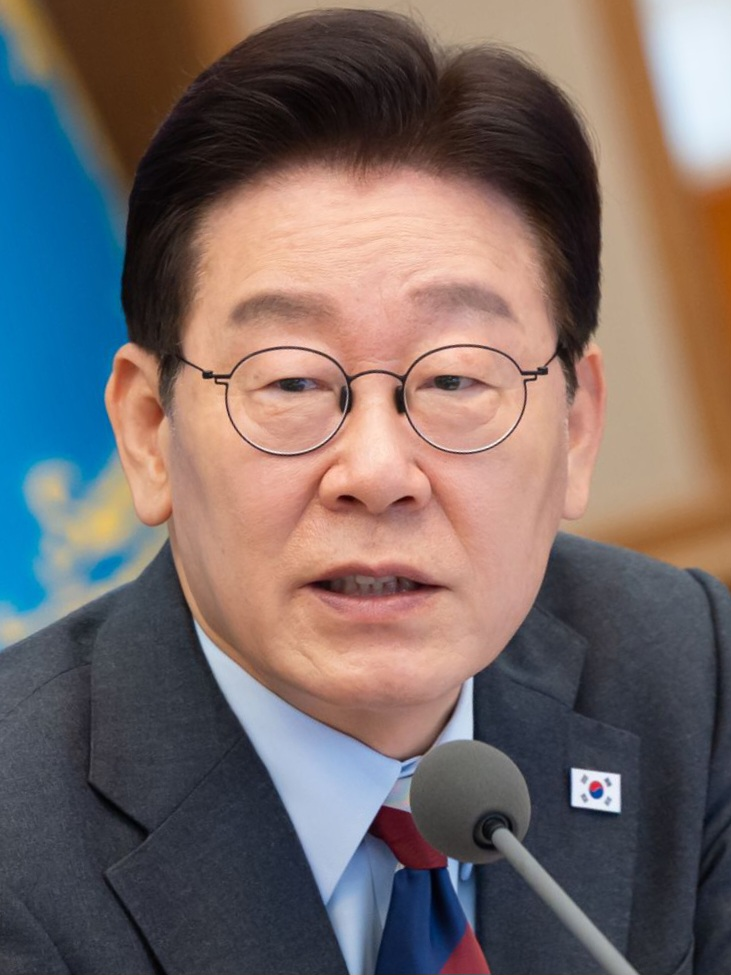
- Top left: Rhee Syng-man became the first president of the Republic of Korea in 1948.
- Top right: Park Chung Hee was the longest-serving president, taking power during the 1961 coup d'etat, sometimes named the Tiger of Yushin Constitution in the 1970s.
- Bottom left: Roh Tae-woo was elected during the 1987 presidential election, started the current Sixth Republic.
- Bottom right: Lee Jae Myung is the incumbent president.

The president of the Republic of Korea serves as the chief executive of the government of the Republic of Korea and the commander-in-chief of the Republic of Korea Armed Forces.

The South Korean government constitutionally considers the Korean Provisional Government (KPG) to be its predecessor. The KPG was established in 1919 as a government in exile in Shanghai during the Japanese occupation of Korea. It had nine different heads of state between September 1919 and August 1948.

Under the 1988 Constitution of the Sixth Republic of Korea, the presidential term is set at five years with no re-election. The president must be a South Korean citizen, at least 40 years old, who has lived in South Korea for 5 years. The term was previously set at four years during the First Republic from 1948 to 1960, including a two-term limit that was repealed in 1954. The presidency was changed into a ceremonial role elected by legislators to five-year terms during the Second Republic from 1960 to 1963. The Third Republic returned the presidency to a directly-elected position with a four-year term in 1963 and repealed the two-term limit in 1969. Under the Yushin Constitution of the Fourth Republic adopted in 1972, the presidency became an indirectly elected position with six-year terms and no limits to re-election. It was replaced with a seven-year term under the Fifth Republic in 1981, which retained the indirect elections but prohibited a second term.

As of 2025, fourteen people have served in full capacity as president of South Korea since the office was formally established on 24 July 1948, when Syngman Rhee took office after being elected by the Constituent National Assembly. The longest-serving president is Park Chung Hee, who held the office for 18 years from a 1961 coup until his assassination in 1979 following a period of authoritarian rule. The first and only woman to hold the presidency was his daughter Park Geun-hye, who was elected in 2012 and removed from office in 2017 after her impeachment was upheld by the Constitutional Court of Korea.

Lee Jae Myung assumed office on 4 June 2025 following the impeachment of his elected predecessor, Yoon Suk Yeol, by the National Assembly on 14 December 2024 after his martial law declaration. His powers were suspended until his impeachment was upheld by the Constitutional Court on 4 April 2025, which formally ended Yoon's presidency. Lee was elected in the 2025 presidential election.

== List of heads of state of the Provisional Government ==
=== Heads of governments proclaimed after the March 1st Movement (1919) ===
Following the March 1st Movement with the Declaration of Independence, several groups within Korea and the Korean diaspora proclaimed the establishment of republican governments, claiming to be the representation of the Korean people. Three of these proclaimed governments remained active in the months thereafter and amalgamated to form the unified Provisional Government of the Republic of Korea.

Four other governments were proclaimed in the aftermaths of the March 1st Movement but these did not have significant activity following the proclamation.

- The Provisional Government of the Republic of Chosun (조선민국임시정부) proclaimed in Seoul on 19 April 1919: President (정도령) Son Byong-hi
- The Government of the Republic of New Korea (신한민국정부) proclaimed in Northwestern Korea including Pyongyang on 17 April 1919: Consul (집정관) Lee Dong-hwi
- The Government of the Korean Republic (고려공화국정부) proclaimed in Manchuria in early 1919
- The Provisional Government in Gando (간도임시정부) proclaimed in Jilin in early 1919

There was a further plan to proclaim The Korean Civil Government (대한민간정부) on 1 April 1919 with Son Byong-hi as the President (대통령) in the anticipation of the success of the March 1st Movement; the planned proclamation was not distributed.

==== Consul-President of the Great Korean Republic (Seoul Government) ====
The Great Korean Republic (대조선공화국) was proclaimed in Seoul on April 23, 1919, by 24 representatives gathered from 13 provinces of Korea. It is commonly known as the Seoul Government (한성정부). Syngman Rhee was elected by the assembled representatives as the Consul-President (집정관총재). Rhee sent letters to foreign heads of state including those of the United States, Japan, and the United Kingdom notifying these countries of the proclamation of the Republic and his election as the President. It was agreed at the time of the amalgamation with the Governments of Shanghai and Vladivostok that the new unified Provisional Government is the successor government of the legitimacy of the Seoul Government.

No.	Portrait	Name (Birth–Death)	Term of Office		Deputy
1		Rhee Syngman 이승만 李承晩 (1875–1965)	23 April 1919	11 September 1919	Premier-President Lee Dong-hwi
1		Rhee Syngman 이승만 李承晩 (1875–1965)	Also the Head of the Shanghai Government as the Chancellor and the Prime Minister of the Vladivostok Government under President Son Byong-hi before the amalgamation of the governments. Became President of the unified Provisional Government on 11 September 1919 but impeached in 1925. Chairman of the State Council of the Provisional Government (1947-1948). President of South Korea (1948-1960)		

==== Prime Ministers of the Provisional Government of the Republic of Korea (Shanghai Government) ====
The Provisional Government of the Republic of Korea (대한민국 임시정부) was established in Shanghai on 11 April 1919 as a result of the first meeting of the Provisional Assembly from the previous night (10 April 1919). Syngman Rhee was elected as the Prime Minister (국무총리). The Government was amalgamated with the Governments proclaimed in Seoul and Vladivostok on 11 September 1919 to form the unified Provisional Government.

No.	Portrait	Name (Birth–Death)	Term of Office		Deputy
1		Rhee Syngman 이승만 李承晩 (1875–1965)	11 April 1919	23 April 1919	
1		Rhee Syngman 이승만 李承晩 (1875–1965)	Also Head of State of the Seoul Government as the Consul-President and the Prime Minister of the Vladivostok Government under President Son Byong-hi before the amalgamation of the governments. Became President of the unified Provisional Government on 11 September 1919 but impeached in 1925. Chairman of the State Council of the Provisional Government (1947-1948). President of South Korea (1948-1960)		
2		Yi Dong-nyeong 이동녕 李東寧 (1869–1940)	23 April 1919	28 June 1919	
2		Yi Dong-nyeong 이동녕 李東寧 (1869–1940)	Later served for twelve years over four different periods as Head of State of the unified Provisional Government. Died in office in 1940		
From 28 June 1919 until 27 August 1919, Director-General of the Interior Ahn Chang Ho (안창호 / 安昌浩) was Acting Chancellor.
3	Yi Donghwi.	Yi Dong-hwi 이동휘 李東輝 (1873–1935)	27 August 1919	11 September 1919	
3	Yi Donghwi.	Yi Dong-hwi 이동휘 李東輝 (1873–1935)	Continued to serve as Prime Minister of the Unified Provisional Government after September 1919 under President Syngman Rhee		

==== President of the National Parliament of Korea (Vladivostok Government) ====
The National Parliament of Korea (대한국민의회) was proclaimed in Vladivostok on 17 March 1919 by the Korean diaspora living in Primorsky Krai, as the re-organisation of the Korean Central General Assembly (한족중앙총회). Son Byong-hi, the leader of 33 representatives who signed the Korean Declaration of Independence on 1 March 1919, was elected as the President. The government was amalgamated with the governments proclaimed in Seoul and Shanghai on 11 September 1919.

No.	Portrait	Name (Birth–Death)	Term of Office		Deputy
1		Son Byong-hi 손병희 孫秉熙 (1861-1922)	17 March 1919	11 September 1919	Vice President Park Young-ho; Prime Minister Syngman Rhee
1		Son Byong-hi 손병희 孫秉熙 (1861-1922)	Leader of the 33 representatives who signed the Korean Declaration of Independence during the March 1st Movement. Head of Cheondogyo (1897-1908). He was in Japanese custody throughout the term as President, having been arrested in the March 1st Movement.		

=== Heads of state of the Provisional Government of the Republic of Korea (1919-1948) ===
Three of the Governments proclaimed in 1919 continued to be active in the months after the March 1st Movement; the Governments proclaimed in Seoul, Shanghai and Vladivostok. After a period of negotiations, members of these three governments agreed to form the unified Provisional Government in Shanghai, with succession of the legitimacy of the Seoul Government and bringing the members of the Vladivostok legislature into the Shanghai legislature. The unified Provisional Government of the Republic of Korea was established on 11 September 1919 with a new constitution.

The forms of the government from September 1919 were:

- Prime minister (국무총리제): 1919
- Presidency (대통령제): 1919–1925
- Presidency of the Governance (국무령제): 1925–1927
- State Council (국무위원제): 1927–1940
- Chairpersonship of the State Affairs Commission (국무위원회 주석제): 1940–1948

In total, nine people served twenty-four terms as heads of states of the Provisional Government between September 1919 and August 1948, when the last Chairman of the State Council Syngman Rhee became the first President of South Korea.

No.	Portrait	Name (Birth–Death)	Term	Term of Office		Political Party	Deputy
Presidents (대통령)
1		Rhee Syng-man 이승만 李承晩 (1875–1965)	1	11 September 1919	1922		Prime Minister; Yi Dong-hwi; Yi Dong-nyeong (acting); Shin Kyu-sik; No Baek-lin; Kim Ku (acting); Yi Dong-nyeong; Park Eun-sik
1		Rhee Syng-man 이승만 李承晩 (1875–1965)	2	1922	23 March 1925		Prime Minister; Yi Dong-hwi; Yi Dong-nyeong (acting); Shin Kyu-sik; No Baek-lin; Kim Ku (acting); Yi Dong-nyeong; Park Eun-sik
1		Rhee Syng-man 이승만 李承晩 (1875–1965)	From 6 June 1924 until 11 December 1924, Prime Minister Yi Dong-nyeong (이동녕 / 李東寧) served as the Acting President for Syngman Rhee.				Prime Minister; Yi Dong-hwi; Yi Dong-nyeong (acting); Shin Kyu-sik; No Baek-lin; Kim Ku (acting); Yi Dong-nyeong; Park Eun-sik
1		Rhee Syng-man 이승만 李承晩 (1875–1965)	From 11 December 1924 until 23 March 1925, Prime Minister Park Eun-sik (박은식 / 朴殷植) served as the Acting President for Syngman Rhee.				Prime Minister; Yi Dong-hwi; Yi Dong-nyeong (acting); Shin Kyu-sik; No Baek-lin; Kim Ku (acting); Yi Dong-nyeong; Park Eun-sik
1		Rhee Syng-man 이승만 李承晩 (1875–1965)	First President of the unified Provisional Government. Previously the Consul-President of the Seoul Government and Chancellor of the Shanghai Government, and Prime Minister under President Son Byong-hi of the Vladivostok Government. Impeached in 1925. Later became the last chairman of the State Council (1947) before becoming the first Speaker of the Constituent Assembly and then the first President of the Republic of Korea (1948-1960). The first Korean to earn a Ph.D. from a university of the Western world (Princeton) in 1910. Forced to resign in the April Revolution of 1960 and died in exile in Hawaii in 1965				
2		Park Eun-sik 박은식 朴殷植 (1859-1922)	3	23 March 1925	7 April 1925		Prime Minister; No Baek-lin
2		Park Eun-sik 박은식 朴殷植 (1859-1922)	Elected after the impeachment of Syngman Rhee; the constitutional amendment of 1925				
Presidents of Governance (국무령)
(2)		Park Eun-sik 박은식 朴殷植 (1859-1922)	4	7 April 1925	26 September 1925		Prime Minister; No Baek-lin
(2)		Park Eun-sik 박은식 朴殷植 (1859-1922)	During September 1925, Director-General of the Interior Lee Yu-pil (이유필 / 李裕弼) served as the Acting President.				Prime Minister; No Baek-lin
(2)		Park Eun-sik 박은식 朴殷植 (1859-1922)	Died two months after leaving office				
3		Yi Sang-ryong 이상룡 李相龍 (1858-1932)	5	26 September 1925	18 February 1926		
3		Yi Sang-ryong 이상룡 李相龍 (1858-1932)	Resigned due to difficulties forming a cabinet				
4		Yang Gi-tak 양기탁 梁起鐸 (1871-1938)	6	18 February 1926	29 April 1926	The Revolutionary Party of Korea (고려혁명당)	
4		Yang Gi-tak 양기탁 梁起鐸 (1871-1938)	Resigned				
5		Yi Dong-nyeong 이동녕 李東寧 (1869-1940)	7	29 April 1926	3 May 1926		
5		Yi Dong-nyeong 이동녕 李東寧 (1869-1940)	Resigned				
6		Ahn Chang Ho 안창호 安昌浩 (1878-1938)	8	3 May 1926	16 May 1926		
6		Ahn Chang Ho 안창호 安昌浩 (1878-1938)	Resigned due to difficulties forming a cabinet				
(5)		Yi Dong-nyeong 이동녕 李東寧 (1869-1940)	9	16 May 1926	7 July 1926		
(5)		Yi Dong-nyeong 이동녕 李東寧 (1869-1940)	Resigned				
7		Hong Jin 홍진 洪震/洪鎭 (1877-1946)	10	7 July 1926	14 December 1926		
7		Hong Jin 홍진 洪震/洪鎭 (1877-1946)	Resigned due to conflict within the Korean resistance. Also served as Speaker of the Provisional Assembly				
8		Kim Ku 김구 金九 (1876-1949)	11	14 December 1926	11 April 1927		
8		Kim Ku 김구 金九 (1876-1949)	Constitutional amendment of 1927				
Chairpersons of the State Council (국무회의 주석)
(8)		Kim Ku 김구 金九 (1876-1949)	12	11 April 1927	18 August 1927		
(8)		Kim Ku 김구 金九 (1876-1949)	First Chairman of the State Council Directory under the Constitution of 1927, where the chairperson is the first among equals in the directory of state councillors				
(5)		Yi Dong-nyeong 이동녕 李東寧 (1869-1940)	13	19 August 1927	October; 1930	Korean Independence Party (한국독립당)	
(5)		Yi Dong-nyeong 이동녕 李東寧 (1869-1940)	14	October; 1930	5 March 1933	Korean Independence Party (한국독립당)	President of Governance; Kim Ku
(5)		Yi Dong-nyeong 이동녕 李東寧 (1869-1940)	First person to have served longer than a year since 1925				
9		Song Byeong-jo 송병조 宋秉祚 (1877-1942)	15	5 March 1933	24 June 1933		President of Governance; Kim Ku
9		Song Byeong-jo 송병조 宋秉祚 (1877-1942)	16	24 June 1933	October; 1933		President of Governance; Kim Ku
9		Song Byeong-jo 송병조 宋秉祚 (1877-1942)	Also served as Speaker of the Provisional Assembly				
(5)		Yi Dong-nyeong 이동녕 李東寧 (1869-1940)	17	October; 1933	October; 1935	Korean Independence Party (한국독립당)	President of Governance; Yang Gi-tak
(5)		Yi Dong-nyeong 이동녕 李東寧 (1869-1940)	18	October; 1935	23 October 1939	Korean National Party (한국국민당)	
(5)		Yi Dong-nyeong 이동녕 李東寧 (1869-1940)	19	23 October 1939	13 March 1940	Korean National Party (한국국민당)	Chief of the Government Staff; Ryu Dong-ryeol
(5)		Yi Dong-nyeong 이동녕 李東寧 (1869-1940)	Died in office				
(8)		Kim Ku 김구 金九 (1876-1949)	20	13 March 1940	8 October 1940	Korean Independence Party (한국독립당)	Chief of the Government Staff; Ryu Dong-ryeol
(8)		Kim Ku 김구 金九 (1876-1949)	The Constitutional Amendment of 1940				
Chairpersons of the State Affairs Commission (국무위원회 주석)
(8)		Kim Ku 김구 金九 (1876-1949)	21	9 October 1940	22 April 1944	Korean Independence Party (한국독립당)	Deputy Chairman; Kim Kyu-sik
(8)		Kim Ku 김구 金九 (1876-1949)	22	26 April 1944	3 March 1947	Korean Independence Party (한국독립당)	Deputy Chairman; Kim Kyu-sik
(8)		Kim Ku 김구 金九 (1876-1949)	Briefly resigned between 31 August and 21 September 1943. The Constitutional Amendment of 1944. Returned to Korea in 1945, after Japan was defeated in World War II				
(1)		Rhee Syngman 이승만 李承晩 (1875-1965)	23	3 March 1947	September; 1947	National Association for the Rapid Realisation of Korean Independence	Deputy Chairman; Kim Ku
(1)		Rhee Syngman 이승만 李承晩 (1875-1965)	24	September; 1947	15 August 1948	National Association for the Rapid Realisation of Korean Independence	Deputy Chairman; Kim Ku
(1)		Rhee Syngman 이승만 李承晩 (1875-1965)	Previously the first President of the Provisional Government (1919-1925) before being impeached. Speaker of the Constituent Assembly in 1948. First President of South Korea (1948-1960)				

== List of presidents ==
Political parties
Conservative (current People Power Party)
Liberal (current Democratic Party)
Military
Independent
Status
Denotes acting president

No.	Portrait	Name (Birth–Death)	Term of office			Political party	Election
No.	Portrait	Name (Birth–Death)	Took office	Left office	Time in office	Political party	Election
President under the United States Army Military Government in Korea
1		Syngman Rhee 이승만 李承晩 (1875–1965)	24 July 1948	15 August 1948	22 days	NARRKI	1st (1948)
Presidents of the First Republic
(1)		Syngman Rhee 이승만 李承晩 (1875–1965)	15 August 1948	26 April 1960 (Note: Rhee resigned following the April Revolution.)	11 years, 255 days	NARRKI Liberal	2nd (1952) 3rd (1956) March 1960
—		Ho Chong 허정 許政 (1896–1988); Acting	27 April 1960	15 June 1960	50 days	Independent	—
Presidents of the Second Republic
—		Ho Chong 허정 許政 (1896–1988); Acting	15 June 1960	15 June 1960	1 day	Independent	—
—		Kwak Sang-hoon 곽상훈 郭尙勳 (1896–1980); Acting	16 June 1960	23 June 1960	7 days	Democratic	—
—		Ho Chong 허정 許政 (1896–1988); Acting	23 June 1960	7 August 1960	46 days	Independent	—
—		Baek Nak-jun 백낙준 白樂濬 (1895–1985); Acting	8 August 1960	12 August 1960	5 days	Independent	—
2		Yun Po-sun 윤보선 尹潽善 (1897–1990)	13 August 1960	16 May 1961	277 days	Democratic	4th (August 1960)
Presidents under the Supreme Council for National Reconstruction (SCNR)
(2)		Yun Po-sun 윤보선 尹潽善 (1897–1990)	16 May 1961	24 March 1962 (Note: Yun resigned in the aftermath of the May 16 coup.)	313 days	Democratic New Democratic	—
—		General; Park Chung Hee 박정희 朴正熙 (1917–1979); Acting	24 March 1962	17 December 1963	1 year, 269 days	Military Democratic Republican	—
President of the Third Republic
3		Park Chung Hee 박정희 朴正熙 (1917–1979)	17 December 1963	21 November 1972	8 years, 341 days	Democratic Republican	5th (1963) 6th (1967) 7th (1971)
Presidents of the Fourth Republic
(3)		Park Chung Hee 박정희 朴正熙 (1917–1979)	21 November 1972	26 October 1979 (Note: Park was assassinated by KCIA director Kim Jae-gyu.)	6 years, 340 days	Democratic Republican	8th (1972) 9th (1978)
—		Choi Kyu-hah 최규하 崔圭夏 (1919–2006)	26 October 1979	6 December 1979	42 days	Independent	—
4		Choi Kyu-hah 최규하 崔圭夏 (1919–2006)	6 December 1979 (Note: Chun Doo-hwan became de facto leader of the country in the aftermath of the Coup d'état of December Twelfth.)	16 August 1980 (Note: Choi resigned in the aftermath of the Coup d'état of May Seventeenth.)	255 days	Independent	10th (1979)
—		Park Choong-hoon 박충훈 朴忠勳 (1919–2001); Acting	16 August 1980	27 August 1980	11 days	Democratic Republican	—
5		Chun Doo-hwan 전두환 全斗煥 (1931–2021)	27 August 1980	24 February 1981	182 days	Military (Hanahoe) Democratic Justice (Hanahoe)	11th (1980)
President of the Fifth Republic
(5)		Chun Doo-hwan 전두환 全斗煥 (1931–2021)	25 February 1981	24 February 1988	7 years	Democratic Justice (Hanahoe)	12th (1981)
Presidents of the Sixth Republic
6		Roh Tae-woo 노태우 盧泰愚 (1932–2021)	25 February 1988	24 February 1993	5 years	Democratic Justice (Hanahoe) Democratic Liberal (Hanahoe) Independent (Hanahoe)	13th (1987)
7		Kim Young-sam 김영삼 金泳三 (1927–2015)	25 February 1993	24 February 1998	5 years	Democratic Liberal New Korea Independent	14th (1992)
8		Kim Dae-jung 김대중 金大中 (1924–2009)	25 February 1998	24 February 2003	5 years	National Congress Millennium Democratic Independent	15th (1997)
9		Roh Moo-hyun 노무현 盧武鉉 (1946–2009)	25 February 2003	12 March 2004 (Note: Roh Moo-hyun was impeached by the National Assembly on 12 March 2004. Powers and duties were assumed by prime minister Goh Kun as acting president. Roh resumed his powers and duties on 14 May 2004, after the Constitutional Court struck down the motion to impeach.)	1 year, 17 days	Millennium Democratic Independent	16th (2002)
—		Goh Kun 고건 高建 (born 1938); Acting	12 March 2004	14 May 2004	64 days	Millennium Democratic	—
(9)		Roh Moo-hyun 노무현 盧武鉉 (1946–2009)	14 May 2004	24 February 2008	3 years, 287 days	Uri Independent	—
10		Lee Myung-bak 이명박 李明博 (born 1941)	25 February 2008	24 February 2013	5 years	Grand National Saenuri	17th (2007)
11		Park Geun-hye 박근혜 朴槿惠 (born 1952)	25 February 2013	10 March 2017 (Note: Park Geun-hye was impeached by the National Assembly on 9 December 2016. Powers and duties were assumed by prime minister Hwang Kyo-ahn as acting president. Park was removed from office after the impeachment was upheld by the Constitutional Court on 10 March 2017.)	4 years, 14 days	Saenuri Liberty Korea	18th (2012)
—		Hwang Kyo-ahn 황교안 黃敎安 (born 1957); Acting	9 December 2016	9 May 2017	152 days	Independent	—
12		Moon Jae-in 문재인 文在寅 (born 1953)	10 May 2017	9 May 2022	5 years	Democratic	19th (2017)
13		Yoon Suk Yeol 윤석열 尹錫悅 (born 1960)	10 May 2022	4 April 2025 (Note: Yoon Suk Yeol was impeached by the National Assembly on 14 December 2024. Powers and duties were assumed by prime minister Han Duck-soo as acting president. Yoon was removed from office after the impeachment was upheld by the Constitutional Court on 4 April 2025.)	2 years, 330 days	People Power	20th (2022)
—		Han Duck-soo 한덕수 韓悳洙 (born 1949); Acting	14 December 2024	27 December 2024 (Note: Han Duck-soo assumed the role as acting president upon the impeachment of Yoon Suk Yeol, but Han himself was impeached by the National Assembly on 27 December 2024. Deputy Prime Minister and Minister of Economy and Finance Choi Sang-mok, who is next in line to the succession took over both powers and duties as acting president and acting prime Minister.)	14 days	Independent	—
—		Choi Sang-mok 최상목 崔相穆 (born 1963); Acting	27 December 2024	24 March 2025 (Note: Han Duck-soo was reinstated by the Constitutional Court on 24 March 2025.)	88 days	Independent	—
—		Han Duck-soo 한덕수 韓悳洙 (born 1949); Acting	24 March 2025	1 May 2025 (Note: Han resigned to run for president in the 2025 South Korean presidential election.)	39 days	Independent	—
—		Lee Ju-ho 이주호 李周浩 (born 1961); Acting	2 May 2025 (Note: Choi Sang-mok was initially expected to assume the acting presidency and prime ministership again on 2 May, but he resigned on 1 May to avoid an impeachment vote by the National Assembly.)	3 June 2025 (Note: Until the end of 3 June 2025.)	32 days	Independent	—
14		Lee Jae Myung 이재명 李在明 (born 1963)	4 June 2025 (Note: Lee Jae-myung began his term at 6:21 a.m. and took the presidential oath at the National Assembly on 11 a.m. on the 4 June 2025.)	Incumbent	1 year, 145 days	Democratic	21st (2025)

== Timeline ==
Ideology	#	Time in office	Name(s)
Conservative	9	21765 days	Choi Kyu-hah, Chun Doo-hwan, Kim Young-sam, Lee Myung-bak, Park Chung Hee, Park Geun-hye, Roh Tae-woo, Syngman Rhee, and Yoon Suk Yeol
Liberal	5	6578 days (Note: As of 27 October 2026.)	Kim Dae-jung, Moon Jae-in, Roh Moo-hyun, Yun Po-sun, and Lee Jae Myung

== List of prime ministers ==
Political parties
Conservative
Liberal
Military
Independent
Status
Denotes acting prime minister

No.	Portrait	Name (Birth–Death)	Term of office			Political party	President
No.	Portrait	Name (Birth–Death)	Took office	Left office	Time in office	Political party	President
Prime minister under the United States Army Military Government in Korea
1		Lee Beom-seok 이범석 李範奭 (1900–1972)	31 July 1948	15 August 1948	15 days	Korean National Youth Association	Rhee Syng-man
Prime ministers of the First Republic
(1)		Lee Beom-seok 이범석 李範奭 (1900–1972)	15 August 1948	20 April 1950	1 year, 248 days	Korean National Youth Association Independent	Syngman Rhee
—		Shin Song-mo 신성모 申性模 (1891–1960); Acting	21 April 1950	22 November 1950	215 days	Independent	Syngman Rhee
2		Chang Myon 장면 張勉 (1899–1966)	23 November 1950	23 April 1952	1 year, 152 days	Liberal	Syngman Rhee
—		Ho Chong 허정 許政 (1896–1988); Acting	6 November 1951	9 April 1952	155 days	Independent	Syngman Rhee
—		Yi Yun-yong 이윤영 李允榮 (1890–1975); Acting	24 April 1952	5 May 1952	11 days	Independent	Syngman Rhee
3		Chang Taek-sang 장택상 張澤相 (1893–1969)	6 May 1952	5 October 1952	152 days	Independent	Syngman Rhee
4		Paik Too-chin 백두진 白斗鎭 (1908–1993)	9 October 1952	17 June 1954	1 year, 251 days	Independent	Syngman Rhee
5		Pyon Yong-tae 변영태 卞榮泰 (1892–1969)	27 June 1954	28 November 1954	154 days	Independent	Syngman Rhee
—		Baek Han-seong 백한성 白汉成 (1899–1971); Acting	18 November 1954	28 November 1954	10 days	Independent	Syngman Rhee
Post abolished (28 November 1954 – 27 April 1960)
—		Ho Chong 허정 許政 (1896–1988); Acting	25 April 1960	15 June 1960	51 days	Independent	Syngman Rhee Ho Chong (acting)
Prime ministers of the Second Republic
6		Ho Chong 허정 許政 (1896–1988)	15 June 1960	18 August 1960	64 days	Independent	Yun Posun
7 (2)		Chang Myon 장면 張勉 (1899–1966)	19 August 1960	16 May 1961	270 days	Democratic	Yun Posun
Chief Cabinet Ministers of the Supreme Council for National Reconstruction (Note: Chief Cabinet Minister of the Military Revolutionary Committee until 20 May 1961.)
(7) (2)		Chang Myon 장면 張勉 (1899–1966)	16 May 1961	17 May 1961	1 day	Democratic	Yun Posun
—		Chief of Staff of the Army; Jang Do-young 장도영 張都暎 (1923–2012)	20 May 1961	3 July 1961	44 days	Military	Yun Posun
—		Chief of Staff of the Army; Song Yo-chan 송요찬 宋堯讚 (1918–1980)	3 July 1961	16 June 1962	348 days	Military	Yun Posun
—		General; Park Chung Hee 박정희 朴正熙 (1917–1979)	18 June 1962	10 July 1962	22 days	Military	Park Chung Hee (acting)
—		Kim Hyun-chul 김현철 金顯哲 (1901–1989)	10 July 1962	17 December 1963	1 year, 160 days	Independent	Park Chung Hee (acting)
Prime ministers of the Third Republic
8		Choi Tu-son 최두선 崔斗善 (1894–1974)	17 December 1963	9 May 1964	144 days	Independent	Park Chung Hee
9		Chung Il-kwon 정일권 丁一權 (1917–1994)	10 May 1964	20 December 1970	6 years, 224 days	Independent	Park Chung Hee
10 (4)		Paik Too-chin 백두진 白斗鎭 (1908–1993)	21 December 1970	3 June 1971	164 days	Democratic Republican	Park Chung Hee
11		Kim Jong-pil 김종필 金鍾泌 (1926–2018)	4 June 1971	21 November 1972	1 year, 170 days	Democratic Republican	Park Chung Hee
Prime ministers of the Fourth Republic
11 (cont'd.)		Kim Jong-pil 김종필 金鍾泌 (1926–2018)	21 November 1972	18 December 1975	3 years, 27 days	Democratic Republican	Park Chung Hee
12		Choi Kyu-hah 최규하 崔圭夏 (1919–2006)	19 December 1975	5 December 1979	3 years, 351 days	Independent	Park Chung Hee
13		Shin Hyun-hwak 신현확 申鉉碻 (1920–2007)	13 December 1979	21 May 1980	160 days	Democratic Republican	Choi Kyu-hah
—		Park Choong-hoon 박충훈 朴忠勳 (1919–2001); Acting	22 May 1980	1 September 1980	102 days	Democratic Republican	Choi Kyu-hah
14		Nam Duck-woo 남덕우 南德祐 (1924–2013)	2 September 1980	2 March 1981	181 days	Independent	Chun Doo-hwan
Prime ministers of the Fifth Republic
14 (cont'd.)		Nam Duck-woo 남덕우 南德祐 (1924–2013)	3 March 1981	3 January 1982	306 days	Independent	Chun Doo-hwan
15		Yoo Chang-soon 유창순 劉彰順 (1918–2010)	4 January 1982	24 June 1982	171 days	Independent	Chun Doo-hwan
16		Kim Sang-hyup 김상협 金相浹 (1920–1995)	25 June 1982	14 October 1983	1 year, 111 days	Independent	Chun Doo-hwan
17		Chin Iee-chong 진의종 陳懿鍾 (1921–1995)	15 October 1983	18 February 1985	1 year, 126 days	Democratic Justice	Chun Doo-hwan
—		Shin Byung-hyun 신병현 申秉鉉 (1921–1999); Acting	11 November 1984	18 February 1985	99 days	Democratic Justice	Chun Doo-hwan
18		Lho Shin-yong 노신영 盧信永 (1930–2019)	19 February 1985	25 May 1987	2 years, 95 days	Democratic Justice	Chun Doo-hwan
—		Lee Han-key 이한기 李漢基 (1917–1995); Acting	26 May 1987	13 July 1987	48 days	Independent	Chun Doo-hwan
19		Kim Chung-yul 김정렬 金貞烈 (1917–1992)	14 July 1987	24 February 1988	225 days	Independent	Chun Doo-hwan
Prime ministers of the Sixth Republic
20		Lee Hyun-jae 이현재 李賢宰 (born 1929)	25 February 1988	4 December 1988	283 days	Independent	Roh Tae-woo
21		Kang Young-hoon 강영훈 姜英勛 (1922–2016)	5 December 1988	26 December 1990	2 years, 21 days	Democratic Justice → Democratic Liberal	Roh Tae-woo
22		Ro Jai-bong 노재봉 盧在鳳 (1936–2024)	27 December 1990	23 May 1991	147 days	Democratic Liberal	Roh Tae-woo
23		Chung Won-shik 정원식 鄭元植 (1928–2020)	24 May 1991	7 October 1992	1 year, 136 days	Independent	Roh Tae-woo
24		Hyun Soong-jong 현승종 玄勝鍾 (1919–2020)	8 October 1992	24 February 1993	139 days	Independent	Roh Tae-woo
25		Hwang In-sung 황인성 黃寅性 (1926–2010)	25 February 1993	16 December 1993	294 days	Democratic Liberal	Kim Young-sam
26		Lee Hoi-chang 이회창 李會昌 (born 1935)	17 December 1993	21 April 1994	125 days	Independent	Kim Young-sam
27		Lee Yung-dug 이영덕 李榮徳 (1926–2010)	22 April 1994	16 December 1994	238 days	Independent	Kim Young-sam
28		Lee Hong-koo 이홍구 李洪九 (born 1934)	17 December 1994	17 December 1995	1 year, 0 days	Independent	Kim Young-sam
29		Lee Soo-sung 이수성 李壽成 (born 1939)	18 December 1995	4 March 1997	1 year, 76 days	New Korea	Kim Young-sam
30		Goh Kun 고건 高建 (born 1938)	5 March 1997	2 March 1998	362 days	New Korea → Grand National	Kim Young-sam
31 (11)		Kim Jong-pil 김종필 金鍾泌 (1926–2018)	3 March 1998	12 January 2000	1 year, 315 days	United Liberal Democrats	Kim Dae-jung
32		Park Tae-joon 박태준 朴泰俊 (1927–2011)	13 January 2000	18 May 2000	126 days	United Liberal Democrats	Kim Dae-jung
—		Lee Hun-jai 이헌재 李憲宰 (born 1944); Acting	19 May 2000	22 May 2000	3 days	Independent	Kim Dae-jung
33		Lee Han-dong 이한동 李漢東 (1934–2021)	23 May 2000	10 July 2002	2 years, 48 days	United Liberal Democrats	Kim Dae-jung
—		Chang Sang 장상 張裳 (born 1939); Acting	11 July 2002	31 July 2002	20 days	Independent	Kim Dae-jung
—		Jeon Yun-churl 전윤철 田允喆 (born 1939); Acting	31 July 2002	9 August 2002	9 days	Independent	Kim Dae-jung
—		Chang Dae-whan 장대환 張大煥 (born 1952); Acting	9 August 2002	10 September 2002	32 days	Independent	Kim Dae-jung
34		Kim Suk-soo 김석수 金碩洙 (born 1932)	10 September 2002	26 February 2003	169 days	Independent	Kim Dae-jung
35 (30)		Goh Kun 고건 高建 (born 1938)	27 February 2003	24 July 2004	1 year, 148 days	Independent	Roh Moo-hyun
—		Lee Hun-jai 이헌재 李憲宰 (born 1944); Acting	25 July 2004	30 July 2004	5 days	Independent	Roh Moo-hyun
36		Lee Hae-chan 이해찬 李海瓚 (born 1952)	30 July 2004	15 March 2006	1 year, 228 days	Uri	Roh Moo-hyun
—		Han Duck-soo 한덕수 韓悳洙 (born 1949); Acting	16 March 2006	19 April 2006	34 days	Independent	Roh Moo-hyun
37		Han Myeong-sook 한명숙 韓明淑 (born 1944)	20 April 2006	6 March 2007	320 days	Uri	Roh Moo-hyun
—		Kwon O-kyu 권오규 權五奎 (born 1952); Acting	7 March 2007	2 April 2007	26 days	Independent	Roh Moo-hyun
38		Han Duck-soo 한덕수 韓悳洙 (born 1949)	2 April 2007	29 February 2008	333 days	Independent	Roh Moo-hyun
39		Han Seung-soo 한승수 韓昇洙 (born 1936)	29 February 2008	28 September 2009	1 year, 212 days	Grand National	Lee Myung-bak
40		Chung Un-chan 정운찬 鄭雲燦 (born 1947)	29 September 2009	11 August 2010	316 days	Independent	Lee Myung-bak
—		Yoon Jeung-hyun 윤증현 尹增鉉 (born 1946); Acting	11 August 2010	1 October 2010	51 days	Grand National	Lee Myung-bak
41		Kim Hwang-sik 김황식 金滉植 (born 1948)	1 October 2010	26 February 2013	2 years, 148 days	Independent	Lee Myung-bak
42		Chung Hong-won 정홍원 鄭烘原 (born 1944)	26 February 2013	16 February 2015	1 year, 355 days	Independent	Park Geun-hye
43		Lee Wan-koo 이완구 李完九 (1950–2021)	17 February 2015	27 April 2015	69 days	Saenuri	Park Geun-hye
—		Choi Kyoung-hwan 최경환 崔炅煥 (born 1955); Acting	27 April 2015	18 June 2015	52 days	Saenuri	Park Geun-hye
44		Hwang Kyo-ahn 황교안 黃敎安 (born 1957)	17 June 2015	11 May 2017	1 year, 328 days	Independent	Park Geun-hye
44		Hwang Kyo-ahn 황교안 黃敎安 (born 1957)	17 June 2015	11 May 2017	1 year, 328 days	Independent	Hwang Kyo-ahn (acting)
—		Yoo Il-ho 유일호 柳一鎬 (born 1955); Acting	11 May 2017	31 May 2017	20 days	Liberty Korea	Moon Jae-in
45		Lee Nak-yon 이낙연 李洛淵 (born 1951)	31 May 2017	14 January 2020	2 years, 228 days	Democratic	Moon Jae-in
46		Chung Sye-kyun 정세균 丁世均 (born 1950)	14 January 2020	16 April 2021	1 year, 92 days	Democratic	Moon Jae-in
—		Hong Nam-ki 홍남기 洪楠基 (born 1960); Acting	16 April 2021	13 May 2021	27 days	Independent	Moon Jae-in
47		Kim Boo-kyum 김부겸 金富謙 (born 1958)	14 May 2021	11 May 2022	362 days	Democratic	Moon Jae-in
—		Choo Kyung-ho 추경호 秋慶鎬 (born 1960); Acting	12 May 2022	20 May 2022	8 days	People Power	Yoon Suk Yeol
48 (38)		Han Duck-soo 한덕수 韓悳洙 (born 1949)	21 May 2022	27 December 2024 (Note: Han was impeached by the National Assembly on 27 December 2024. Deputy Prime Minister and Minister of Economy and Finance Choi Sang-mok, who is next in line to the succession took over both powers and duties as acting prime minister and acting president.)	2 years, 220 days	Independent	Yoon Suk Yeol
—		Choi Sang-mok 최상목 崔相穆 (born 1963); Acting	27 December 2024	24 March 2025	87 days	Independent	Yoon Suk Yeol
48 (38)		Han Duck-soo 한덕수 韓悳洙 (born 1949)	24 March 2025	1 May 2025 (Note: Han resigned to run for president in the 2025 South Korean presidential election.)	38 days	Independent	Yoon Suk Yeol
—		Lee Ju-ho 이주호 李周浩 (born 1961); Acting	2 May 2025 (Note: Choi Sang-mok was initially expected to assume the acting prime ministership and presidency again on 2 May, but he resigned on 1 May to avoid an impeachment vote by the National Assembly.)	3 July 2025	62 days	Independent	Lee Ju-ho (acting)
49		Kim Min-seok 김민석 金民錫 (born 1964)	3 July 2025	30 June 2026	362 days	Democratic	Lee Jae Myung
50		Han Seong-sook 한성숙 韓聖淑 (born 1967)	1 July 2026	Incumbent	118 days	Independent	Lee Jae Myung

== List of vice presidents of South Korea ==
Political parties
Conservative
Liberal
Independent

No.	Portrait	Name	Term of office			Political party	President
No.	Portrait	Name	Took office	Left office	Time in office	Political party	President
1		Yi Si-yeong 이시영 李始榮 (1868 –1953)	24 July 1948	9 May 1951 (Resigned)	2 years, 289 days	Korea Democratic Party	Rhee Syng-man
2		Kim Seong-su 김성수 金性洙 (1891 –1955)	17 May 1951	29 May 1952 (Resigned)	1 year, 12 days	Korea Democratic Party	Rhee Syng-man
3		Ham Tae-young 함태영 咸台永 (1873 –1964)	15 June 1952	14 August 1956	4 years, 60 days	Independent	Rhee Syng-man
4		Chang Myon 장면 張勉 (1899 –1966)	15 August 1956	23 April 1960 (Resigned)	3 years, 252 days	Democratic Party	Rhee Syng-man

== See also ==
- Government of South Korea
- List of presidents of South Korea by age
- List of monarchs of Korea
- List of presidents of South Korea by time in office
- List of presidents of the Provisional Government of the Republic of Korea
- List of prime ministers of South Korea
- Presidential elections in South Korea
- Provisional Government of the Republic of Korea
- Vice President of South Korea
