= List of presidents of the Provisional Government of the Republic of Korea =

Leaders of the Korean Provisional Government (1919–1948)

Prior to the establishment of the two Korean states in 1948, the Provisional Government of the Republic of Korea was established in Shanghai in September 1919 as the continuation of several governments proclaimed in the aftermath of March 1st Movement earlier that year coordinated Korean people's resistance against Japan during the Japanese occupation of Korea. The legitimacy of the Provisional Government has been recognised and succeeded by South Korea in the latter's original Constitution of 1948 and the current Constitution of 1988. Nine people have served twenty-four terms as heads of state (with varying titles) of the Provisional Government between September 1919 and August 1948.

== List of heads of state of the Provisional Government ==
=== Heads of governments proclaimed after the March 1st Movement (1919) ===
Following the March 1st Movement with the Declaration of Independence, several groups within Korea and the Korean diaspora proclaimed the establishment of republican governments, claiming to be the representation of the Korean people. Three of these proclaimed governments remained active in the months thereafter and amalgamated to form the unified Provisional Government of the Republic of Korea.

Four other governments were proclaimed in the aftermaths of the March 1st Movement but these did not have significant activity following the proclamation.

- The Provisional Government of the Republic of Chosun (조선민국임시정부) proclaimed in Seoul on 19 April 1919: President (정도령) Son Byong-hi
- The Government of the Republic of New Korea (신한민국정부) proclaimed in Northwestern Korea including Pyongyang on 17 April 1919: Consul (집정관) Lee Dong-hwi
- The Government of the Korean Republic (고려공화국정부) proclaimed in Manchuria in early 1919
- The Provisional Government in Gando (간도임시정부) proclaimed in Jilin in early 1919

There was a further plan to proclaim The Korean Civil Government (대한민간정부) on 1 April 1919 with Son Byong-hi as the President (대통령) in the anticipation of the success of the March 1st Movement; the planned proclamation was not distributed.

==== Consul-President of the Great Korean Republic (Seoul Government) ====
The Great Korean Republic (대조선공화국) was proclaimed in Seoul on April 23, 1919, by 24 representatives gathered from 13 provinces of Korea. It is commonly known as the Seoul Government (한성정부). Syngman Rhee was elected by the assembled representatives as the Consul-President (집정관총재). Rhee sent letters to foreign heads of state including those of the United States, Japan, and the United Kingdom notifying these countries of the proclamation of the Republic and his election as the President. It was agreed at the time of the amalgamation with the Governments of Shanghai and Vladivostok that the new unified Provisional Government is the successor government of the legitimacy of the Seoul Government.

No.	Portrait	Name (Birth–Death)	Term of Office		Deputy
1		Rhee Syngman 이승만 李承晩 (1875–1965)	23 April 1919	11 September 1919	Premier-President Lee Dong-hwi
1		Rhee Syngman 이승만 李承晩 (1875–1965)	Also the Head of the Shanghai Government as the Chancellor and the Prime Minister of the Vladivostok Government under President Son Byong-hi before the amalgamation of the governments. Became President of the unified Provisional Government on 11 September 1919 but impeached in 1925. Chairman of the State Council of the Provisional Government (1947-1948). President of South Korea (1948-1960)		

==== Prime Ministers of the Provisional Government of the Republic of Korea (Shanghai Government) ====
The Provisional Government of the Republic of Korea (대한민국 임시정부) was established in Shanghai on 11 April 1919 as a result of the first meeting of the Provisional Assembly from the previous night (10 April 1919). Syngman Rhee was elected as the Prime Minister (국무총리). The Government was amalgamated with the Governments proclaimed in Seoul and Vladivostok on 11 September 1919 to form the unified Provisional Government.

No.	Portrait	Name (Birth–Death)	Term of Office		Deputy
1		Rhee Syngman 이승만 李承晩 (1875–1965)	11 April 1919	23 April 1919	
1		Rhee Syngman 이승만 李承晩 (1875–1965)	Also Head of State of the Seoul Government as the Consul-President and the Prime Minister of the Vladivostok Government under President Son Byong-hi before the amalgamation of the governments. Became President of the unified Provisional Government on 11 September 1919 but impeached in 1925. Chairman of the State Council of the Provisional Government (1947-1948). President of South Korea (1948-1960)		
2		Yi Dong-nyeong 이동녕 李東寧 (1869–1940)	23 April 1919	28 June 1919	
2		Yi Dong-nyeong 이동녕 李東寧 (1869–1940)	Later served for twelve years over four different periods as Head of State of the unified Provisional Government. Died in office in 1940		
From 28 June 1919 until 27 August 1919, Director-General of the Interior Ahn Chang Ho (안창호 / 安昌浩) was Acting Chancellor.
3	Yi Donghwi.	Yi Dong-hwi 이동휘 李東輝 (1873–1935)	27 August 1919	11 September 1919	
3	Yi Donghwi.	Yi Dong-hwi 이동휘 李東輝 (1873–1935)	Continued to serve as Prime Minister of the Unified Provisional Government after September 1919 under President Syngman Rhee		

==== President of the National Parliament of Korea (Vladivostok Government) ====
The National Parliament of Korea (대한국민의회) was proclaimed in Vladivostok on 17 March 1919 by the Korean diaspora living in Primorsky Krai, as the re-organisation of the Korean Central General Assembly (한족중앙총회). Son Byong-hi, the leader of 33 representatives who signed the Korean Declaration of Independence on 1 March 1919, was elected as the President. The government was amalgamated with the governments proclaimed in Seoul and Shanghai on 11 September 1919.

No.	Portrait	Name (Birth–Death)	Term of Office		Deputy
1		Son Byong-hi 손병희 孫秉熙 (1861-1922)	17 March 1919	11 September 1919	Vice President Park Young-ho; Prime Minister Syngman Rhee
1		Son Byong-hi 손병희 孫秉熙 (1861-1922)	Leader of the 33 representatives who signed the Korean Declaration of Independence during the March 1st Movement. Head of Cheondogyo (1897-1908). He was in Japanese custody throughout the term as President, having been arrested in the March 1st Movement.		

=== Heads of state of the Provisional Government of the Republic of Korea (1919-1948) ===
Three of the Governments proclaimed in 1919 continued to be active in the months after the March 1st Movement; the Governments proclaimed in Seoul, Shanghai and Vladivostok. After a period of negotiations, members of these three governments agreed to form the unified Provisional Government in Shanghai, with succession of the legitimacy of the Seoul Government and bringing the members of the Vladivostok legislature into the Shanghai legislature. The unified Provisional Government of the Republic of Korea was established on 11 September 1919 with a new constitution.

The forms of the government from September 1919 were:

- Prime minister (국무총리제): 1919
- Presidency (대통령제): 1919–1925
- Presidency of the Governance (국무령제): 1925–1927
- State Council (국무위원제): 1927–1940
- Chairpersonship of the State Affairs Commission (국무위원회 주석제): 1940–1948

In total, nine people served twenty-four terms as heads of states of the Provisional Government between September 1919 and August 1948, when the last Chairman of the State Council Syngman Rhee became the first President of South Korea.

No.	Portrait	Name (Birth–Death)	Term	Term of Office		Political Party	Deputy
Presidents (대통령)
1		Rhee Syng-man 이승만 李承晩 (1875–1965)	1	11 September 1919	1922		Prime Minister; Yi Dong-hwi; Yi Dong-nyeong (acting); Shin Kyu-sik; No Baek-lin; Kim Ku (acting); Yi Dong-nyeong; Park Eun-sik
1		Rhee Syng-man 이승만 李承晩 (1875–1965)	2	1922	23 March 1925		Prime Minister; Yi Dong-hwi; Yi Dong-nyeong (acting); Shin Kyu-sik; No Baek-lin; Kim Ku (acting); Yi Dong-nyeong; Park Eun-sik
1		Rhee Syng-man 이승만 李承晩 (1875–1965)	From 6 June 1924 until 11 December 1924, Prime Minister Yi Dong-nyeong (이동녕 / 李東寧) served as the Acting President for Syngman Rhee.				Prime Minister; Yi Dong-hwi; Yi Dong-nyeong (acting); Shin Kyu-sik; No Baek-lin; Kim Ku (acting); Yi Dong-nyeong; Park Eun-sik
1		Rhee Syng-man 이승만 李承晩 (1875–1965)	From 11 December 1924 until 23 March 1925, Prime Minister Park Eun-sik (박은식 / 朴殷植) served as the Acting President for Syngman Rhee.				Prime Minister; Yi Dong-hwi; Yi Dong-nyeong (acting); Shin Kyu-sik; No Baek-lin; Kim Ku (acting); Yi Dong-nyeong; Park Eun-sik
1		Rhee Syng-man 이승만 李承晩 (1875–1965)	First President of the unified Provisional Government. Previously the Consul-President of the Seoul Government and Chancellor of the Shanghai Government, and Prime Minister under President Son Byong-hi of the Vladivostok Government. Impeached in 1925. Later became the last chairman of the State Council (1947) before becoming the first Speaker of the Constituent Assembly and then the first President of the Republic of Korea (1948-1960). The first Korean to earn a Ph.D. from a university of the Western world (Princeton) in 1910. Forced to resign in the April Revolution of 1960 and died in exile in Hawaii in 1965				
2		Park Eun-sik 박은식 朴殷植 (1859-1922)	3	23 March 1925	7 April 1925		Prime Minister; No Baek-lin
2		Park Eun-sik 박은식 朴殷植 (1859-1922)	Elected after the impeachment of Syngman Rhee; the constitutional amendment of 1925				
Presidents of Governance (국무령)
(2)		Park Eun-sik 박은식 朴殷植 (1859-1922)	4	7 April 1925	26 September 1925		Prime Minister; No Baek-lin
(2)		Park Eun-sik 박은식 朴殷植 (1859-1922)	During September 1925, Director-General of the Interior Lee Yu-pil (이유필 / 李裕弼) served as the Acting President.				Prime Minister; No Baek-lin
(2)		Park Eun-sik 박은식 朴殷植 (1859-1922)	Died two months after leaving office				
3		Yi Sang-ryong 이상룡 李相龍 (1858-1932)	5	26 September 1925	18 February 1926		
3		Yi Sang-ryong 이상룡 李相龍 (1858-1932)	Resigned due to difficulties forming a cabinet				
4		Yang Gi-tak 양기탁 梁起鐸 (1871-1938)	6	18 February 1926	29 April 1926	The Revolutionary Party of Korea (고려혁명당)	
4		Yang Gi-tak 양기탁 梁起鐸 (1871-1938)	Resigned				
5		Yi Dong-nyeong 이동녕 李東寧 (1869-1940)	7	29 April 1926	3 May 1926		
5		Yi Dong-nyeong 이동녕 李東寧 (1869-1940)	Resigned				
6		Ahn Chang Ho 안창호 安昌浩 (1878-1938)	8	3 May 1926	16 May 1926		
6		Ahn Chang Ho 안창호 安昌浩 (1878-1938)	Resigned due to difficulties forming a cabinet				
(5)		Yi Dong-nyeong 이동녕 李東寧 (1869-1940)	9	16 May 1926	7 July 1926		
(5)		Yi Dong-nyeong 이동녕 李東寧 (1869-1940)	Resigned				
7		Hong Jin 홍진 洪震/洪鎭 (1877-1946)	10	7 July 1926	14 December 1926		
7		Hong Jin 홍진 洪震/洪鎭 (1877-1946)	Resigned due to conflict within the Korean resistance. Also served as Speaker of the Provisional Assembly				
8		Kim Ku 김구 金九 (1876-1949)	11	14 December 1926	11 April 1927		
8		Kim Ku 김구 金九 (1876-1949)	Constitutional amendment of 1927				
Chairpersons of the State Council (국무회의 주석)
(8)		Kim Ku 김구 金九 (1876-1949)	12	11 April 1927	18 August 1927		
(8)		Kim Ku 김구 金九 (1876-1949)	First Chairman of the State Council Directory under the Constitution of 1927, where the chairperson is the first among equals in the directory of state councillors				
(5)		Yi Dong-nyeong 이동녕 李東寧 (1869-1940)	13	19 August 1927	October; 1930	Korean Independence Party (한국독립당)	
(5)		Yi Dong-nyeong 이동녕 李東寧 (1869-1940)	14	October; 1930	5 March 1933	Korean Independence Party (한국독립당)	President of Governance; Kim Ku
(5)		Yi Dong-nyeong 이동녕 李東寧 (1869-1940)	First person to have served longer than a year since 1925				
9		Song Byeong-jo 송병조 宋秉祚 (1877-1942)	15	5 March 1933	24 June 1933		President of Governance; Kim Ku
9		Song Byeong-jo 송병조 宋秉祚 (1877-1942)	16	24 June 1933	October; 1933		President of Governance; Kim Ku
9		Song Byeong-jo 송병조 宋秉祚 (1877-1942)	Also served as Speaker of the Provisional Assembly				
(5)		Yi Dong-nyeong 이동녕 李東寧 (1869-1940)	17	October; 1933	October; 1935	Korean Independence Party (한국독립당)	President of Governance; Yang Gi-tak
(5)		Yi Dong-nyeong 이동녕 李東寧 (1869-1940)	18	October; 1935	23 October 1939	Korean National Party (한국국민당)	
(5)		Yi Dong-nyeong 이동녕 李東寧 (1869-1940)	19	23 October 1939	13 March 1940	Korean National Party (한국국민당)	Chief of the Government Staff; Ryu Dong-ryeol
(5)		Yi Dong-nyeong 이동녕 李東寧 (1869-1940)	Died in office				
(8)		Kim Ku 김구 金九 (1876-1949)	20	13 March 1940	8 October 1940	Korean Independence Party (한국독립당)	Chief of the Government Staff; Ryu Dong-ryeol
(8)		Kim Ku 김구 金九 (1876-1949)	The Constitutional Amendment of 1940				
Chairpersons of the State Affairs Commission (국무위원회 주석)
(8)		Kim Ku 김구 金九 (1876-1949)	21	9 October 1940	22 April 1944	Korean Independence Party (한국독립당)	Deputy Chairman; Kim Kyu-sik
(8)		Kim Ku 김구 金九 (1876-1949)	22	26 April 1944	3 March 1947	Korean Independence Party (한국독립당)	Deputy Chairman; Kim Kyu-sik
(8)		Kim Ku 김구 金九 (1876-1949)	Briefly resigned between 31 August and 21 September 1943. The Constitutional Amendment of 1944. Returned to Korea in 1945, after Japan was defeated in World War II				
(1)		Rhee Syngman 이승만 李承晩 (1875-1965)	23	3 March 1947	September; 1947	National Association for the Rapid Realisation of Korean Independence	Deputy Chairman; Kim Ku
(1)		Rhee Syngman 이승만 李承晩 (1875-1965)	24	September; 1947	15 August 1948	National Association for the Rapid Realisation of Korean Independence	Deputy Chairman; Kim Ku
(1)		Rhee Syngman 이승만 李承晩 (1875-1965)	Previously the first President of the Provisional Government (1919-1925) before being impeached. Speaker of the Constituent Assembly in 1948. First President of South Korea (1948-1960)				
