= Government of Korea =

Government of Korea may refer to:

- Government of South Korea, the modern government which controls the southern portion of the Korean peninsula
- Government of North Korea, the modern government which controls the northern portion of Korean peninsula
- United States Army Military Government in Korea, which controlled the southern portion of the Korean Peninsula from 1945 to 1948
- Provisional Government of the Republic of Korea, a government-in-exile established in 1919
- Korea under Japanese rule, for the government which controlled Korea from 1910 to 1945
- List of monarchs of Korea, for governments before 1910
