= Pak Ŭnsik =

Korean politician (1859–1925)

Park Eunsik
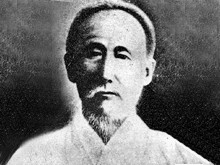

2nd President of the Provisional Government of the Republic of Korea
- In office March 24, 1925 – September, 1925
- Preceded by: Syngman Rhee
- Succeeded by: Yi Sang-ryong

Personal details
- Born: September 30, 1859 Nammyeon, Hwangju-gun, Joseon
- Died: November 1, 1925 (aged 66) Shanghai, China

Korean name
- Hangul: 박은식
- Hanja: 朴殷植
- RR: Bak Eunsik
- MR: Pak Ŭnsik

Pak Ŭnsik (September 30, 1859 – November 1, 1925) was a Korean historian and the second President of the Provisional Government of the Republic of Korea in Shanghai during part of 1925. Soon after the impeachment of Syngman Rhee from the presidency, Pak was elected the president, but he soon died from illness while in office. Pak was succeeded by Yi Sang-ryong as the president.

== Bibliography ==
- Neo-Confucianism Reformation Argument (유교구신론; 儒敎求新論; Yugyogusillon.
- Painful History of Korea (한국통사; 韓國痛史; Han'gukt'ongsa, 1919).
- The Bloody History of the Korean Independence Movement (한국독립운동지혈사; 韓國獨立運動之血史; Han'guktongnibundongjihyŏlsa, 1920)

Political offices
Preceded by Syngman Rhee	Presidents of Provisional Government of the Republic of Korea; 1925	Succeeded by Yi Sang-ryong
