= Hong Chin =

Korean politician (1877–1946)

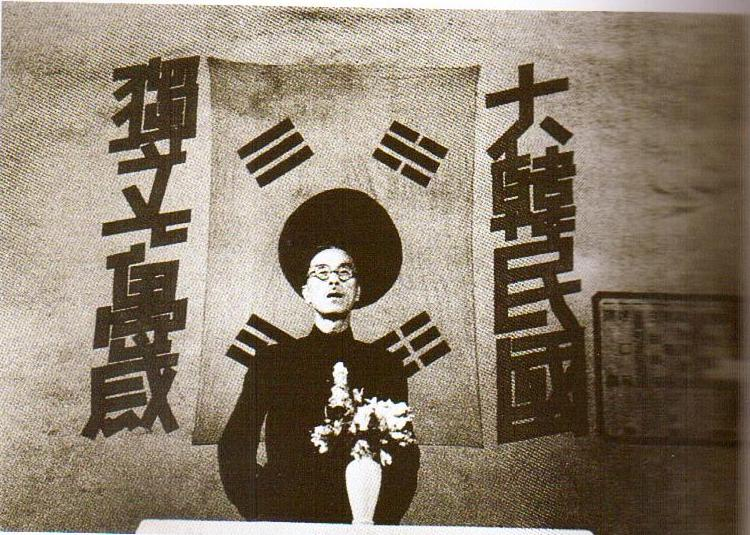
- Hong in 1943

8th President of the Provisional Government of the Republic of Korea
- In office July 7, 1926 – December 14, 1926
- Preceded by: Yi Tongnyŏng
- Succeeded by: Kim Ku

Personal details
- Born: 27 August 1877 Hanseong-bu, Joseon
- Died: 9 September 1946 (aged 69) Seoul, southern Korea
- Spouse: Nam Sangbok

Korean name
- Hangul: 홍진
- Hanja: 洪震; 洪鎭
- RR: Hong Jin
- MR: Hong Chin

Art name
- Hangul: 만오
- Hanja: 晩悟
- RR: Mano
- MR: Mano

Former name
- Hangul: 홍면희
- Hanja: 洪冕喜
- RR: Hong Myeonhui
- MR: Hong Myŏnhŭi

Hong Chin (Korean: 홍진; Hanja: 洪震; 27 August 1877 – 9 September 1946), also known as Hong Myŏnhŭi (홍면희; 洪冕喜), was a leader of the Korean independence movement. He is also sometimes known by his art name Mano (만오; 晩悟), and his Christian name, Andre.

He was born in the Joseon period in Yeongdong, Chungcheong Province, to a yangban family of the Pungsan Hong lineage. He had practiced law in Korea in the private sector and in the government sector as a prosecutor and a judge before joining the independence movement.

Hong held a number of chief positions under the Provisional Government of the Republic of Korea during the Japanese Occupation. Under his administration as the fourth President, the provisional Korean government was recognized by the Republic of China, France and Poland. His main theme was unity among factions of the Korean independence movement.

In 1928, he established the Korean Independence Party (한국독립당; 韓國獨立黨) with Kim Ku, Yi Dong-nyung, and he was elected to an executive position in the Korean Independence camp (한국광복진선; 韓國光復陣線) in 1938. After the independence of Korea was gained, he returned to South Korea having earned recognition as a Provisional Government leading figure who acted as Chairman of the Emergency National Council (비상국민회의; 非常國民會議). Hong was posthumously honored by the government of South Korea with the Order of Independence Merit for National Foundation in 1962.

His biography by Professor Han, Si Joon contains a detailed family tree of Hong Chin tracing back to Goryeo dynasty's Hong Ji-gyeong, later known as a great master of Korean classical verse in the Joseon period. The current family jokbo contains surviving members of the family who are naturalized American citizens.

== See also ==
- History of Korea
- Korea under Japanese rule
- Korean independence movements

Political offices
Preceded by Yi Dong-nyung	Presidents of Provisional Government of the Republic of Korea; 1926	Succeeded by Kim Ku
