= Yi Tonghwi =

Korean communist (1873–1935)

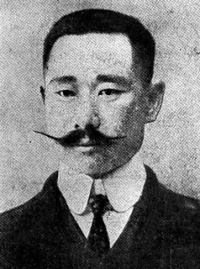
Yi Tonghwi

Yi Tonghwi (Korean: 이동휘; Hanja: 李東煇; 1873 – 31 January 1935) was a Korean politician who served as the second Prime Minister of the Provisional Government of the Republic of Korea. He led armed actions against the Empire of Japan in an attempt to liberate Korea.

== Early life ==
Yi Tonghwi was born in Tanchon, Korean Empire, in 1873. He was a Protestant Christian. He started to study Chinese characters at age 8. He became an errand boy for the governor of the South Hamgyong Province at age 18. He attended a military academy in Seoul and became a lieutenant colonel in the Imperial Korean Armed Forces.

== Career ==
The Japan–Korea Treaty of 1907 dissolved Korea's military, but Yi opposed this and organised a volunteer army on Ganghwa Island with Yeon Gi-u and Kim Dong-su. However, they were captured and exiled. An American missionary was able to secure Yi's release in October and he left for Manchuria.

Yi fought against the Empire of Japan's annexation of Korea as a member of the righteous armies. He went into exile with several hundred soldiers into northern Korea, Manchuria, and then the Russian Far East. He was arrested for being involved in the 105-Man Incident in 1911, but was released without charges.

Yi was among the founding members of the New People's Association. Yi was one of the founding members of the Korean Socialist Party in Khabarovsk on 26 June 1918, and sought support from the Bolsheviks. The party opposed the Provisional Government of the Republic of Korea and passed a resolution baring its members from joining it on 25 April 1919. Yi became disillusioned with the party and left to join the provisional government in Shanghai on 30 August.

Yi was selected to serve as prime minister of the provisional government when it was founded in Shanghai. Yi led one of the three factions in the provisional government, with Syngman Rhee and Ahn Chang Ho leading the other two. Yi supported raising funds to fund military actions against the Japanese in the 1920s and using Siberia and Manchuria as training grounds. He served as prime minister from 1919 to January 1921, when he broke from the provisional government. The provisional government denounced Yi on 26 January 1922.

Yi formed the Korean Communist Party in 1920, and members from the Korean Socialist Party joined the party on 10 January 1921. The 1st Party Congress was held in May 1921, after working on the party's platform for months. This platform condemned both the League of Nations and Second International. The party claimed to have 1,000 members by April 1922.

== Death ==
Yi died in Vladivostok on 31 January 1935. He was reinterned at the Seoul National Cemetery in 2007, and the Order of Merit for National Foundation was given to him.

== Works cited ==
=== Books ===
- Armstrong, Charles (2003). The North Korean Revolution, 1945–1950. Cornell University Press. ISBN 9780801489143.
- Buswell, Robert; Lee, Timothy, eds. (2006). Christianity in Korea. University of Hawai'i Press. ISBN 9780824861896.
- Park, Chung-Shin (2003). Protestantism and Politics in Korea. University of Washington Press. ISBN 9780295802084.
- Robinson, Michael (1988). Cultural Nationalism in Colonial Korea, 1920-1925. University of Washington Press. ISBN 9780295805146.
- Santos, Aurora; Santos, Yvette, eds. (2025). The League of Nations Experience: Overlapping Readings. De Gruyter. ISBN 9783111063973.
- Scalapino, Robert; Lee, Chong-Sik (1972). Communism in Korea: Part 1: The Movement. University of California Press. ISBN 0520020804.
- Suh, Dae-sook (1967). The Korean Communist Movement: 1918-1948. Princeton University Press.

=== Journals ===
- Robinson, Michael (1984). "National Identity and the Thought of Sin Ch'aeho: Sadaejuŭi and Chuch'e in History and Politics". The Journal of Korean Studies. 5. Duke University Press: 121–142. doi:10.2307/41490188. JSTOR 41490188.

=== News ===
- "72nd Memorial Ceremony for Independence Activist Lee Dong-hwi". Naver. 31 January 2007. Archived from the original on 14 July 2025.

=== Web ===
- "이동휘 (李東輝)". Encyclopedia of Korean Culture. Archived from the original on 21 June 2025.
