= Provisional Government of the Republic of Korea =

1919–1948 government-in-exile

Coordinates: 37°32′N 126°59′E

Provisional Government of the Republic of Korea: 대한민국 임시정부; 大韓民國臨時政府
- 1919–1945
- Flag Emblem
- Motto: 대한독립만세 (Hangul) 大韓獨立萬歲 (Hancha) "Long Live Korean Independence"
- Anthem: 애국가 Aegukga "The Patriotic Song"
- Government Seal

- Map of the Korean Peninsula showing the government's territorial claims, controlled by Japan
- Status: Unrecognized, provisional government-in-exile
- Capital-in-exile: Shanghai (1919–1932); Hangzhou (1932–1935); Jiaxing (1935); Nanjing (1935–1937); Changsha (1937–1938); Guangzhou (1938–1939); Qijiang (1939–1940); Chongqing (1940–1945)
- Official languages: Korean
- Government: Presidential republic (1919–1925); Parliamentary republic (1925–1940); Semi-presidential republic (1940–1945)
- President
  - 1919–1925 (first): Syngman Rhee (Note: In Washington D.C. until 8 December 1920)
  - 1940–1945 (last): Kim Ku
- Prime Minister
  - 1919–1921 (first): Yi Dong-nyeong
  - 1924–1925 (last): Park Eun-sik
- Legislature: Provisional Parliament
- History
  - Independence declared: 1 March 1919
  - Government formed in Shanghai: 11 April 1919
  - Unified with Korean Vladivostok and Seoul governments: 11 September 1919
  - War declared against Axis: 9 December 1941
  - Allied declaration in Cairo: 27 November 1943
  - National Liberation Day: 15 August 1945
  - Soviet administration north of the 38th parallel: 24 August 1945
  - American administration south of the 38th parallel: 8 September 1945

Area
  - Total: 223,915 km^{2} (86,454 sq mi)
- Currency: Korean won
Preceded by
Korea under Japanese rule
Succeeded by
1945: Soviet Civil Administration
United States Army Military Government in Korea
1948: First Republic of Korea
- Today part of: China; South Korea; North Korea

- Provisional Government of the Republic of Korea
- Hangul: 대한민국 임시정부
- Hanja: 大韓民國臨時政府
- RR: Daehanminguk imsi jeongbu
- MR: Taehanmin'guk imsi chŏngbu

The Korean Provisional Government (KPG), formally the Provisional Government of the Republic of Korea (Korean: 대한민국 임시정부), was a Korean government-in-exile based in China during Japanese rule over Korea.

The KPG was founded in the Shanghai French Concession on 11 April 1919. A provisional constitution providing for a democratic republic named the "Republic of Korea" was enacted. It introduced a presidential system and three branches (legislative, administrative and judicial) of government. The KPG inherited the territory of the former Korean Empire. The Korean resistance movement actively supported the independence movement under the provisional government, and received economic and military support from the Kuomintang, the Soviet Union, and France, among others. After 1932, the KPG moved to a number of different cities and eventually settled in Chongqing until the end of World War II in 1945. Several of the buildings used as the headquarters of the KPG in Shanghai and Chongqing are now preserved as museums.

After the surrender of Japan on 15 August 1945, the provisional government came to an end. Its members returned to Korea, where they put together their own political organizations under the American military administration and competed for power in what would become South Korea. On 15 August 1948, Syngman Rhee, who had been the first president of the Provisional Government, became the first president of the Republic of Korea.

The 1987-amended Constitution of South Korea recognizes the Republic of Korea "succeeds the legal traditions" of the KPG.

== Background ==
Between 1905 and 1910, Korea was a colony of the Empire of Japan, and from 1910 to 1945 an annexed territory outright. Throughout and even before this time, dozens of groups emerged that advocated for Korean independence. However, even until the end of the colonial period, there was no single organization that pro-independence Koreans considered their sole representative.

=== March 1st Movement ===
On 21 January 1919, rumors that Emperor Gojong was poisoned by the Japanese imperial family came to light.

This culminated in a demonstration that took place at the Emperor's funeral on 1 March. Among the 20 million Koreans present, 3.1 million people participated in the demonstration, about 2.20 million, 10% of the total population. There were 7,500 deaths, 16,000 injured, and 46,000 arrested and detained. The protests, which began in March and continued until May, included 33 people who had signed the Declaration of Independence, but were in fact held by the Japanese police.

After the Japanese violently cracked down on the protests, numerous Koreans fled the peninsula, including many of the later founders of the KPG.

== Formation ==
The government was formed on 11 April 1919, shortly after the March First Movement of the same year. The Provisional Government of the Republic of Korea was founded in 1919 as part of the March First Movement.

The key members in its establishment included An Chang Ho and Syngman Rhee, both of whom were leaders of the Korean National Association at that time. Changho played an important part in making Shanghai the center of the liberation movement and in getting KPG operations underway. As acting premier, he helped reorganize the government from a parliamentary cabinet system to a presidential system.

The independence movement's popularity grew quickly both locally and abroad. After the 1 March 1919, campaign, a plan was set up at home and abroad to continue expanding the independence movement. However, some were hesitant due to their obedience to the occupying powers. At that time, many independent activists were gathered in Shanghai. Those who set up independent temporary offices repeatedly discussed ways to find new breakthroughs in the independence movement. First, the theory of provisional government was developed, and it was generally argued that the government should organize a government in exile against the Chosun governor's office. However, it was argued that the party was not sufficiently equipped to form a government.

Shanghai was a transportation hub and also a center of support for the Guangdong government led by Wu Yuan. In addition, there were delegates from the United Kingdom, France, Germany, and the United States, which allowed them to escape the influence of Japan. For this reason, independent offices flocked to Shanghai.

Independence movements in Shanghai moved more aggressively in the summer of 1919. Seo Byeong-ho, Seung-hyung Cho, Dong-ho Cho, Park Chan-ik, and Sun Woo-hyuk met with the governments from Korea, Manchuria, the Russian Maritime Province and the Americas. Shanghai's independent offices provided accommodation for people from outside the country, centering on the French settlement, and organizing social gatherings for Koreans to create a close network. Around this time, the highly respected independent branch offices of Manchu and the Maritime provinces, such as Dongying, Lee, Shim, Kim DongSam, Shin Chae Ho, Cho Sung Hwan and Chaosang, came to Shanghai and were sent to Korea.

=== Paris Peace Conference ===
The Shinhan Youth Party wanted a promise of independence in Korea at the 1919 Paris Peace Conference and dispatched Kim Kyu-sik as a delegate. Since his childhood, he had been studying at the Underwood Academy, where he received a Western education in English, Latin, theology, mathematics, and science. He was multilingual able to speak English, French, German, Russian, Mongolian and Sanskrit as well as Korean, Chinese and Japanese. He delivered the Korean Independence petition to President Woodrow Wilson in the name of the Shinhan Youth Party, and went to Paris, France, in January 1919 to submit a petition in the name of the Provisional Government of the Republic of Korea. However, he was not allowed to attend the Peace Conference because the provisional government had not yet been established. Kim subsequently formed a provisional government to receive the credentials of officially representing the Korean government. Kim's trip to the conference became the motivation for the 1 March Movement and the establishment of the Provisional Government of the Republic of Korea.

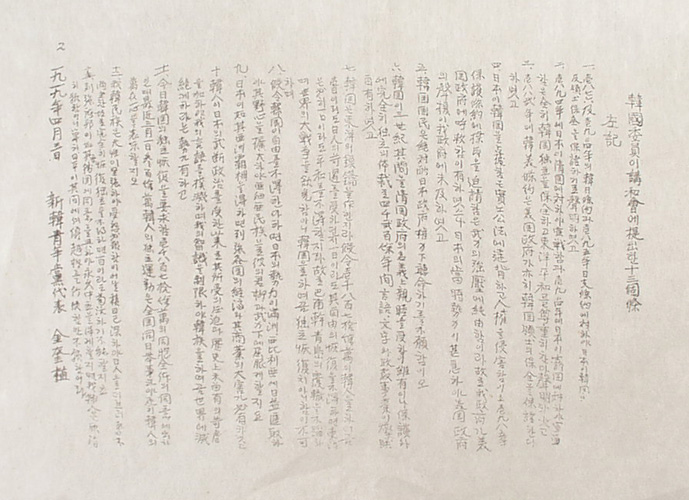
The Shinhan Youth Party submitted to "Thirteen Demands" in the Paris Peace Conference

Before his departure, Kim ordered the Shinhan Youth Party members to hold an independent demonstration, saying: "Even if sent to Paris, Westerners do not know who I am. To expose and propagate Japanese rule, one must declare independence in Korea. The person to be dispatched will be sacrificed, but what happens in Korea will fulfill my mission well."

Kim Kyu-sik communicated with the Shinhan Youth Party in Paris by radio, and they raised money for the lobbying effort. Inspired by Kim Kyu-sik's arguments, the Shinhan Young Youth Party sent people to Korea and met with national leaders such as Ham Tae-young and Cho Man-sik. Kim Kyu-sik's order for independence demonstrations was the moment when the 1 March 1919 campaign began.

Participants at the time of the establishment of the Provisional Government of the Republic of Korea were Kim Kyu-sik, representative of the Shinhan Youth Group, Lyuh Woon-Hyung, Cho Seong Hwan (Minister of Defense), Kim Cheol, Sun Woo Hyuk, Han Jin Kyo, Chang Deok soo, Cho Dong Ho, Seo Byung Ho and Kim In Jon. There were 30 people including Nam Hyung Woo, Shin Ik-Hee, Yi Si-yeong, Yi Dong-nyeong, Cho Wan Gu, Sin Chaeho, Jo So-ang and Kim Dae Ji. In addition, Kim Ku, Yi Dong-nyeong participated in the establishment, and Ahn Changho, Yi Dong-hwi, and Syngman Rhee were appointed between April and September 1919 and entered Shanghai. Hwang Ki-hwan became the chief secretary of the Korea provisional government's French branch.

=== Korean Imperial Household attempt to join the KPG ===
Former empire personnel also participated in the establishment of the Provisional Government of the Republic of Korea. Kim Gajin, who served as an observer of Hwanghae Province and Chungcheongnam-do during the reign of the empire, was a high-ranking official who was defeated in 1910 by the Japanese after being deprived of his country. He formed a secret independent organization called Daedong Dan after the 1 March Movement began in 1919, and served as governor. He was exiled to the Provisional Government of the Republic of Korea in Shanghai, China in October 1919, and served as a provisional government adviser.

Kim Gajin, the fifth son of Emperor Gojong of the Korean Empire and one of the prime candidates for the prince, prepared a plan to escape to the Korean Provisional Government. The Prince Imperial Uihwa sent a letter and indicated his intention to participate in the Provisional Government of the Republic of Korea. In November 1919, the Prince Imperial Uihwa went to Andong, Manchuria, to escape to the provisional government in Shanghai, but was arrested after being apprehended by the Japanese army and forced to return home. The contents of the book, which was sent to the Provisional Government by the King, were published in an independent newspaper article on 20 November 1919. The current day of historians estimated the Prince Imperial Uihwa had thought of the Korean independence movement and tried to join the Provisional Government of the Republic of Korea when he attended the Roanoke College in the US. The reason was Prince Imperial Uihwa's colleague was Kim Kyu-sik and he had a relationship with Kim Kyu-sik in Roanoke College.

=== Establishment of the KPG ===
Twenty-nine Korean independence activists organized primarily by the Shinhan Youth Party convened the first session of the Provisional Assembly (Uijeongwon) on Route Père Robert in the Shanghai French Concession on 10 April 1919, electing Yi Dong-nyeong chairman and Son Chong-do vice-chairman. The following day, the assembly established the Provisional Government of the Republic of Korea. It adopted the Provisional Charter of the Republic of Korea, which defined the new state as a democratic republic. The assembly elected Syngman Rhee as prime minister in absentia and appointed the heads of six ministries: Ahn Chang-ho (Internal Affairs), Kim Kyu-sik (Foreign Affairs), Yi Dong-hwi (Military Affairs), Yi Si-yeong (Justice), Choi Jae-hyung (Finance), and Moon Chang-bum (Transportation). The Uijeongwon served as legislature for the government-in-exile, with power to pass laws and elect officials.

The Shanghai-based government was one of several provisional bodies formed after the March 1st Movement. The Korean People's Congress was established in the Russian Maritime Province on 17 March 1919, and the Hanseong Provisional Government was proclaimed in Seoul on 23 April. These provisional governments recognized the need for a single, unified leadership, leading to integration negotiations. A key point of contention was the location of the government's seat; representatives of the Korean People's Congress argued for the Russian Maritime Province, and the Shanghai group advocated their location's diplomatic advantages. An agreement was reached, and, the Korean People's Congress and the Hanseong Provisional Government were integrated into the Shanghai government on 11 September 1919. This established a unified Provisional Government of the Republic of Korea, creating a central authority for many (but not all) Korean independence factions in China, Russia, and Korea.

== Militant activities ==
The government resisted the colonial rule of Korea that lasted from 1910 to 1945. The government's Military Affairs Department coordinated armed resistance such as the Northern Military Administration Office, Korean Independence Army, and the Korean Patriotic Organization against the Imperial Japanese Army during the 1920s and 1930s, including at the Battle of Samdunja, Battle of Bongoh Town in June 1920 and the Battle of Chingshanli in October 1920. However, their manpower diminished when they attempted to reorganize their forces into the Korean Independence Corps at Svobodny, Amur Oblast, Russia. The Bolsheviks believed them to be a liability to the Soviet Union during the Russian Civil War when the Japanese joined forces with the White Army and forced them disarm and join the Red Army. But they refused and the Red Army massacred them at Svobodny. Still, despite these losses, they hugely struck a blow to the Japanese military leadership in Shanghai's Hongkew Park, April 1932.

The Japanese invaded Manchuria forced members of these authorities to defect and form the National People's Prefecture under a political party and their army, the Korean Revolutionary Party and the Korean Revolutionary Army. Some however formed political parties in the provisional government such as the Korean Independence Party and the Korean National Revolutionary Party with their own armed wings. They coordinated with the Chinese Nationalist Army, the Chinese Red Army and Communist Korean guerrillas such as the Northeast Anti-Japanese United Army against the Japanese armies to continue their fight for independence.

This struggle culminated in the formation of the Korean Volunteer Army, and the Korean Liberation Army in the 1940s, bringing together all Korean resistance groups in exile. They were also assisted by the United States Office of Strategic Services (Eagle Project).

== Role during World War II ==
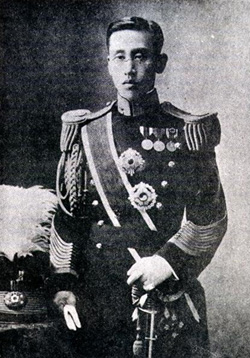
Prince Imperial Uihwa

The government duly declared war against the Axis powers, Japan and Germany, on 9 December 1941, and the Liberation Army took part in Allied action in China and parts of Southeast Asia. These efforts resulted in a guarantee from China, the United States, and the British in the Cairo Conference of a liberated Korea in the future, which was reaffirmed by the Soviets, the United States, and the British in the Potsdam Conference. The Soviets declared war on Japan and invaded northern Korea. The US then struck Hiroshima and Nagasaki which resulted in the surrender of Japan. The Soviets then began to strongly influence the parts of Korean they controlled.

During World War II, the Korean Liberation Army was preparing an assault against Japanese forces in Korea in conjunction with the US Office of Strategic Services. On 15 August 1945, the Japanese empire began to collapse and Korea finally gained independence a few weeks later, ending 35 years of Japanese occupation. This independence was reaffirmed in the Treaty of San Francisco. Thus, the Korean provisional government's goal of ending Japanese rule in Korea was ultimately achieved when the Japanese surrendered on 2 September 1945.

== Foreign relations ==
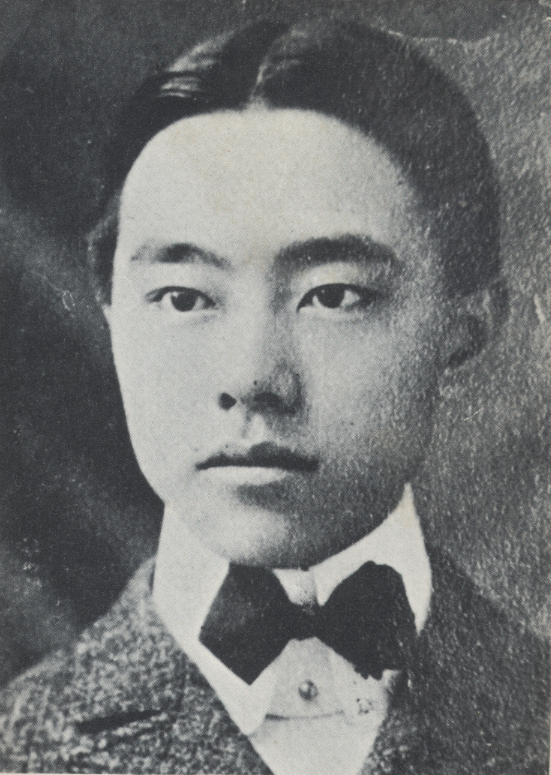
Kim Kyu-sik (1890s)

In 1919, when US President Woodrow Wilson advocated for national self-determination, Rhee promoted the League of Nations mandate in the United States, and Kim Kyu-sik pushed for independence under the approval of a victorious country in Paris. Although no country formally recognized the provisional government, the KPG gained formal recognition from Sun Yat-sen's Guangzhou Government of the ROC in 1921, with Park Chan-ik as KPG's ambassador in Guangzhou, and substantial support from Nationalist Government of the ROC over the years.

Besides Sun Yat-sen,, many senior figures within the Kuomintang supported the KPG in China. These included Chen Qimei, Song Jiaoren, Liao Zhongkai, Hu Hanmin, Dai Jitao, Zou Lu, Yu Youren, and Chen Guofu. Prominent figures outside the Kuomintang, such as Tang Shaoyi, Zhang Jiluan, Hu Lin, and Kang Youwei, also provided assistance. In Yunnan, Tang Jiyao provided not only financial support but also military training for Korean independence activists, including Lee Beom-seok and Kwon Ki-ok.

The KPG also received protection of Shanghai French Concession mainly with the help from Du Yuesheng, and diplomatic approvals from Polish government-in-exile, the Soviet Union, the US and the UK. Jo So-ang, the head of the KPG's diplomatic department, met with the French ambassador in Chongqing and was quoted as saying that the French government would give unofficial approval to the government in April 1945.

In 2019, the US Congress adopted a specific resolution that stated the Provisional Government of the Republic of Korea was essential to the success of South Korean democracy.

== After the Liberation of Korea ==
After the end of World War II, the US and the Soviets stationed military forces in Korea. The Soviets occupied the northern half of the Korea, declaring war on Japan, and formed the Soviet Civil Administration after the end of World War II. Similarly, the US formed the United States Army Military Government in southern part of Korea.

The leading members of Korean Provisional Government disapproved of the system of trusteeship applied to the Korean Peninsula. Primarily, both sides of the political spectrum, with the left led by center-left politician Lyuh Woon-hyung and the right by center-right politician Kim Kyu-sik, disagreed with this system of trusteeship and resolved to cooperate despite having different opinions on governance.

However, the president of the US, Harry S. Truman declared the Truman Doctrine in March 1947. This doctrine accelerated what would be the Cold War and left long-lasting implications on the Korean Peninsula, as it led to the permanent division of territories into North Korea and South Korea in 1948 and the outbreak of full-scale civil war in June 1950 that ended in a ceasefire in July 1953.

== Transition of power ==
The Korean government in exile was established to lead the independence movement on the Korean Peninsula against colonial rule. It was established on 11 April 1919, in Shanghai, China. On 11 September of the same year, it established a single government in Shanghai by integrating temporary governments such as those of Seoul and Russia's Maritime Province.

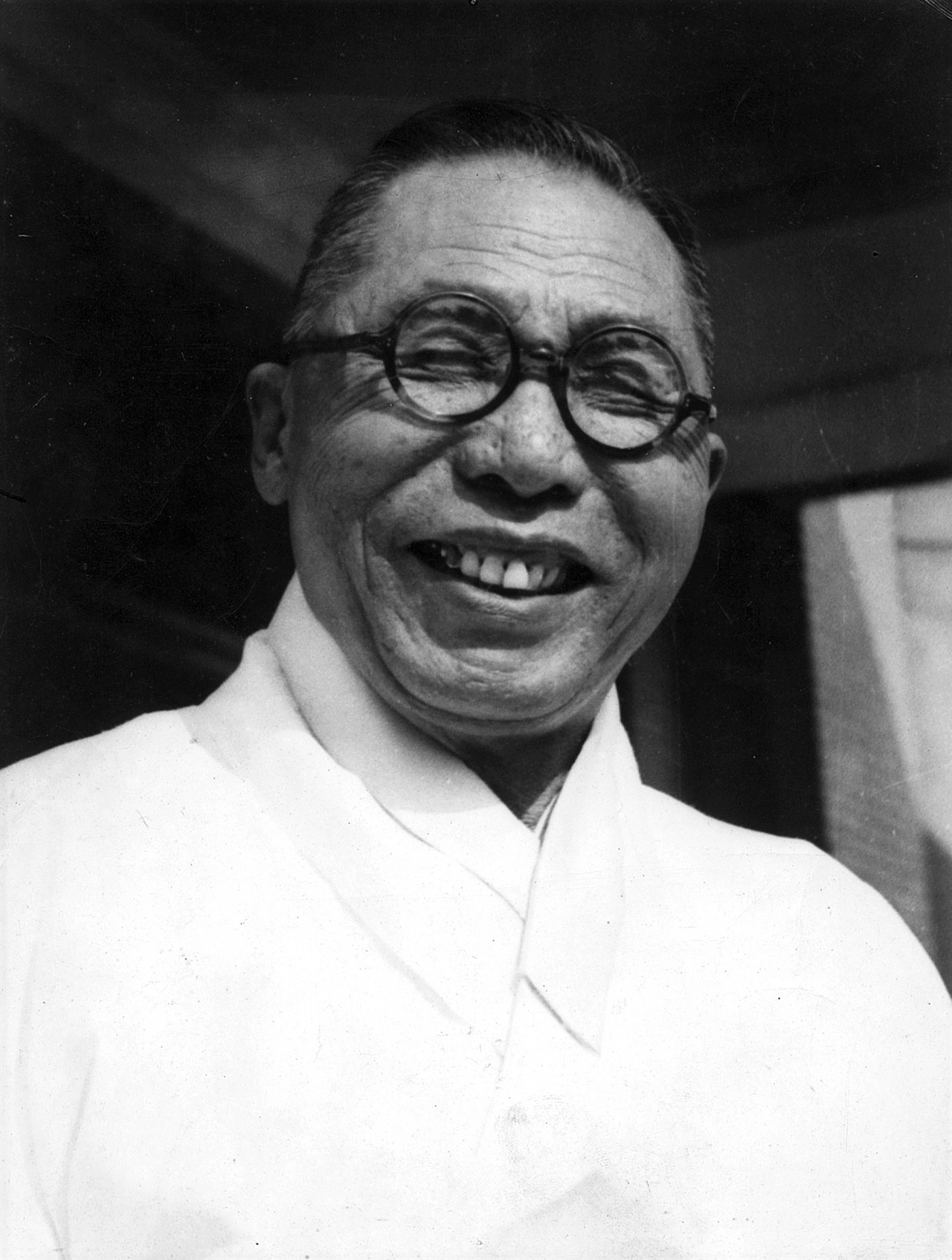
Kim Ku in 1949

The Provisional Constitution was enacted to form the Republic of Korea as a democratic republic. It introduced the presidential system and established separate legislative, administrative and judicial branches. It succeeded the territory of the Korean Empire. Interim president Rhee was impeached and succeeded by Kim Ku. Under the Provisional Government of the Republic of Korea, he actively supported the independence movement, including the organization of the Korean Liberation Army, and received economic and military support from China, the Soviet Union, France, the United Kingdom, and the United States.

After the surrender of Japan on 15 August 1945, government figures such as Kim Ku and Syngman Rhee returned to Korea. On 15 August 1948, Rhee, who had the first president of the Provisional Government, became the first President of the Republic of Korea. The current South Korean government through the national constitution revised in 1987 states that the South Korean people inherited the rule of the Provisional Government of the Republic of Korea, though this has been criticized by Brian Reynolds Myers as constituting revisionism.

== Legacy ==
On 11 April 2019, the Government of South Korea celebrated the 100th anniversary of the KPG in Yeouido Park. As South Korean President Moon Jae-in was then in the United States, the ceremony was attended by Prime Minister of South Korea Lee Nak-yon, Speaker of the National Assembly Moon Hee-sang, and Chairman of the Joint Chiefs of Staff Park Han-ki. Also in attendance were the surviving members of the KPG and/or their family, as part of the Liberation Association. The "Provisional Charter of the Republic of Korea" was read during the ceremony. South Korean actor Kang Ha-neul also read a narrative piece themed around the "Dream of the KPG". Member of the K-pop group Shinee and South Korean actor Onew performed the military musical titled "Shinheung Military Academy".

The KPG figures prominently in Ed Park's novel Same Bed Different Dreams.

== List of presidents ==
=== Prime ministers and presidents ===
- Syngman Rhee (11 September 1919 – 21 March 1925) – Impeached by the provisional assembly
  - Yi Dong-nyeong (16 June 1924 – 11 December 1924) – Acting
  - Park Eun-sik (11 December 1924 – 24 March 1925) – Acting
- Park Eun-sik (24 March 1925 – September 1925)

=== Presidents of the Governance and State Council Directory ===
- Yi Yu-pil (September 1925) – Acting
- Yi Sang-ryong (September 1925 – January 1926)
- Yang Gi-tak (January 1926 – 29 April 1926)
- Yi Dong-nyeong (29 April – 3 May 1926)
- Ahn Chang Ho (3 – 16 May 1926)
- Yi Dong-nyeong (16 May – 7 July 1926)
- Hong Jin (7 July – 14 December 1926)
- Kim Ku (14 December 1926 – August 1927)

=== Chairmen of the State Council ===
- Yi Dong-nyeong (August 1927 – 24 June 1933)
- Song Byeong-jo (24 June 1933 – October 1933)
- Yi Dong-nyeong (October 1933 – 13 March 1940) – Died in office
- Kim Ku (1940 – August 1945)

== Gallery ==
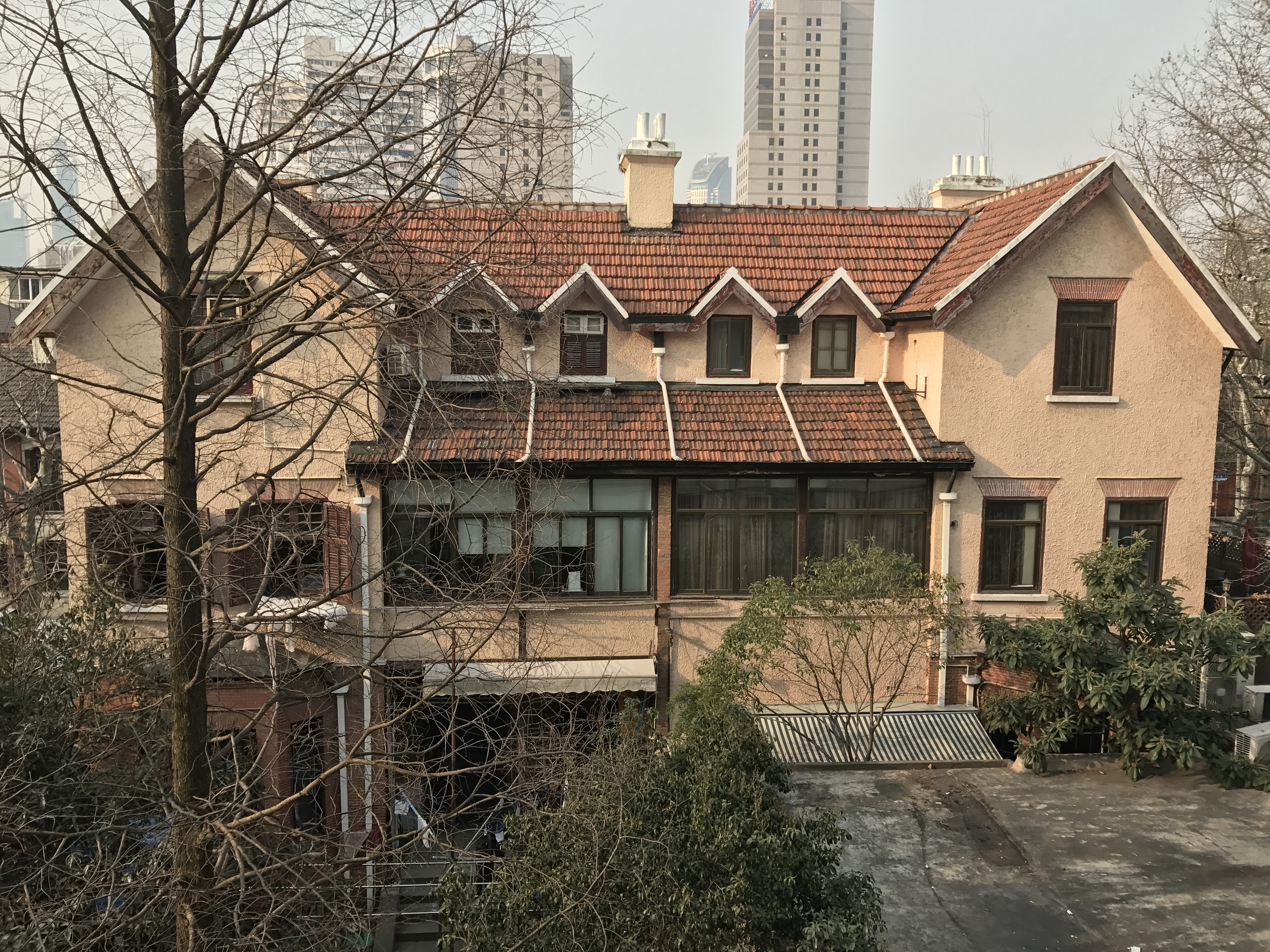
No. 50, Ruijin No. 2 Road, Huangpu District, Shanghai, the birthplace of the Provisional Government of the Republic of Korea

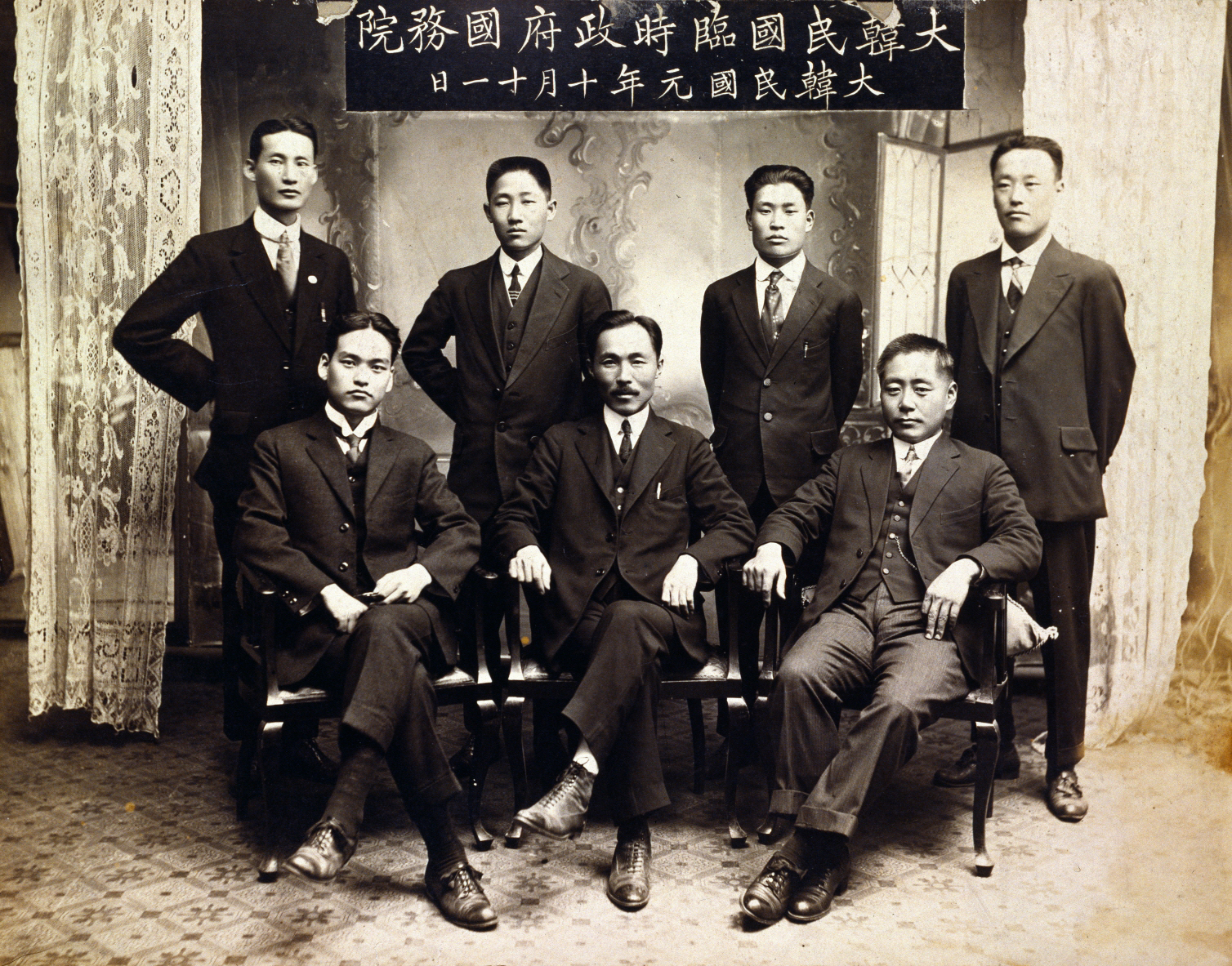
Photo memorializing the establishment of the Provisional Government, 1919

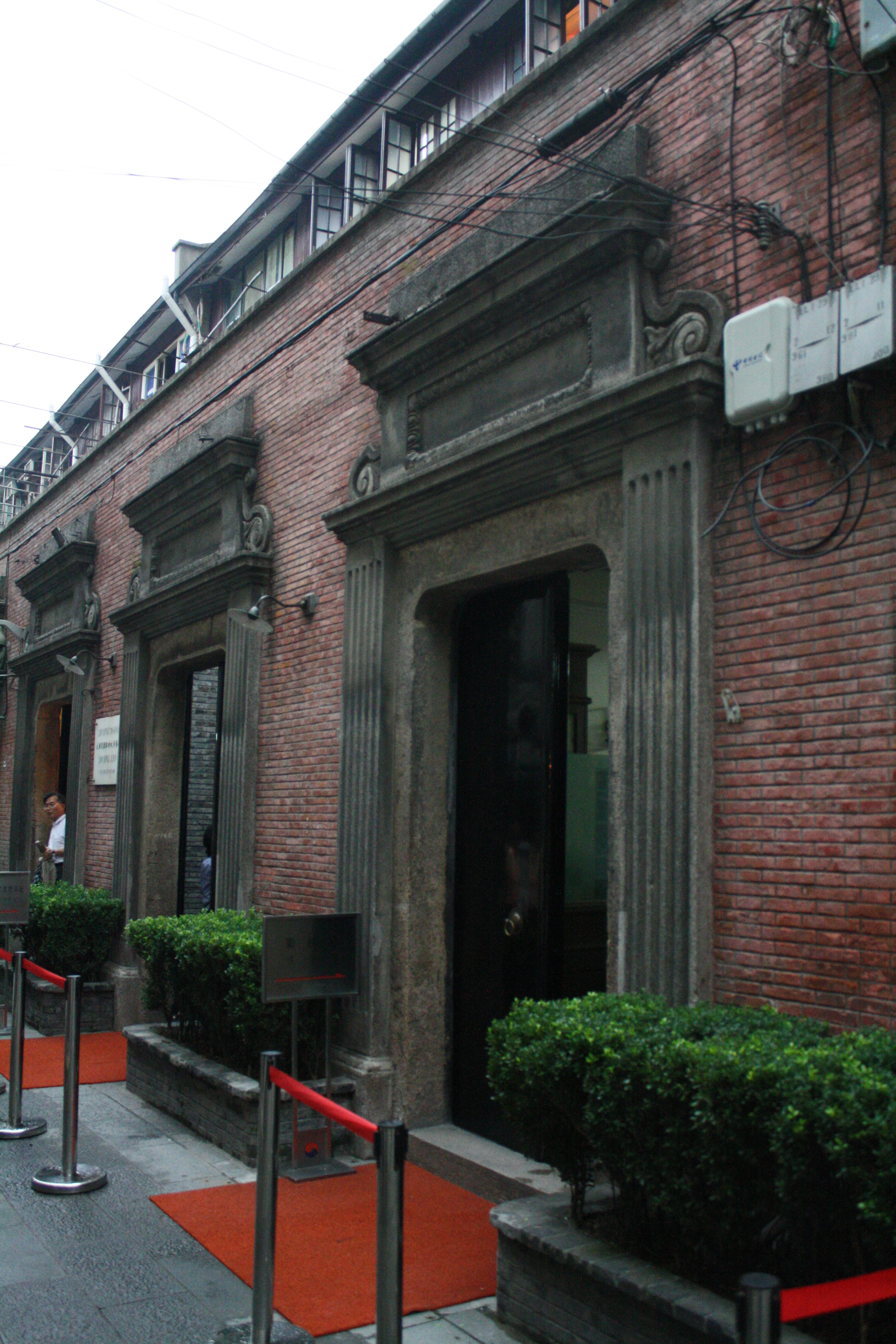
Site of the Provisional Government in Huangpu District, Shanghai

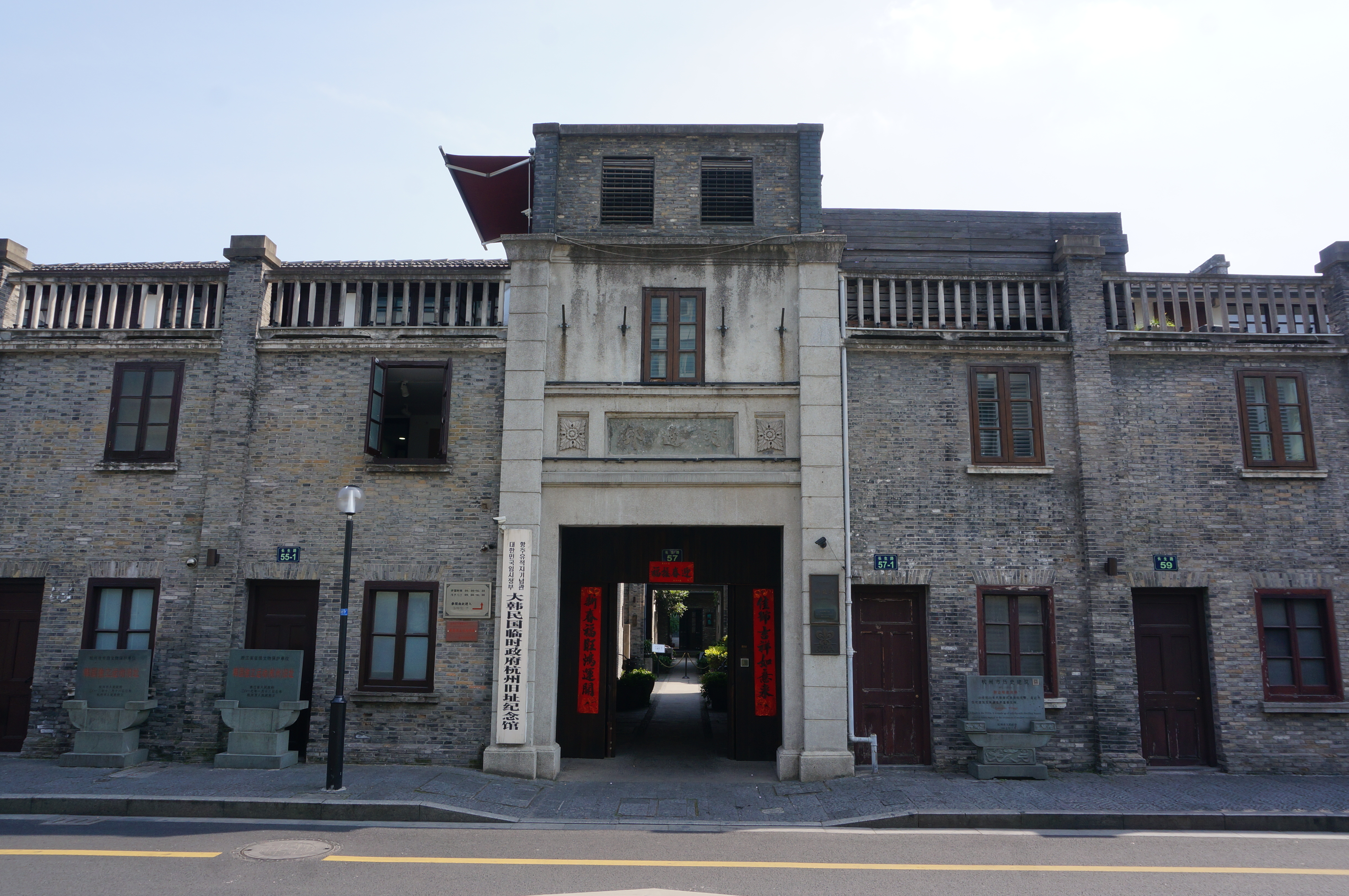
Site of the Provisional Government in Hangzhou

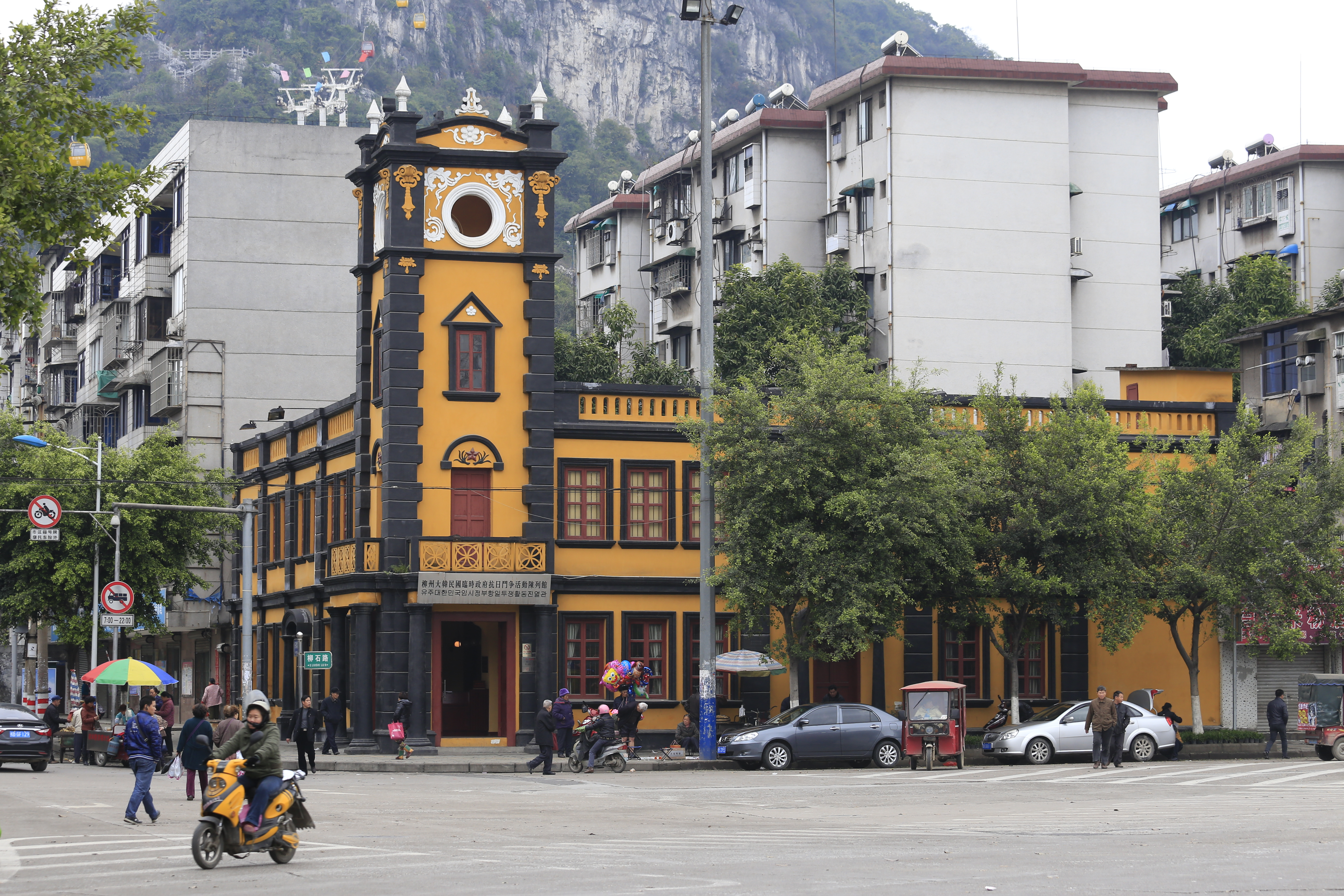
Provisional Government in Liuzhou

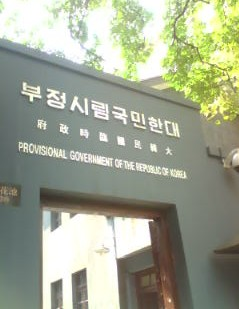
Museum of the Provisional Government in Chongqing

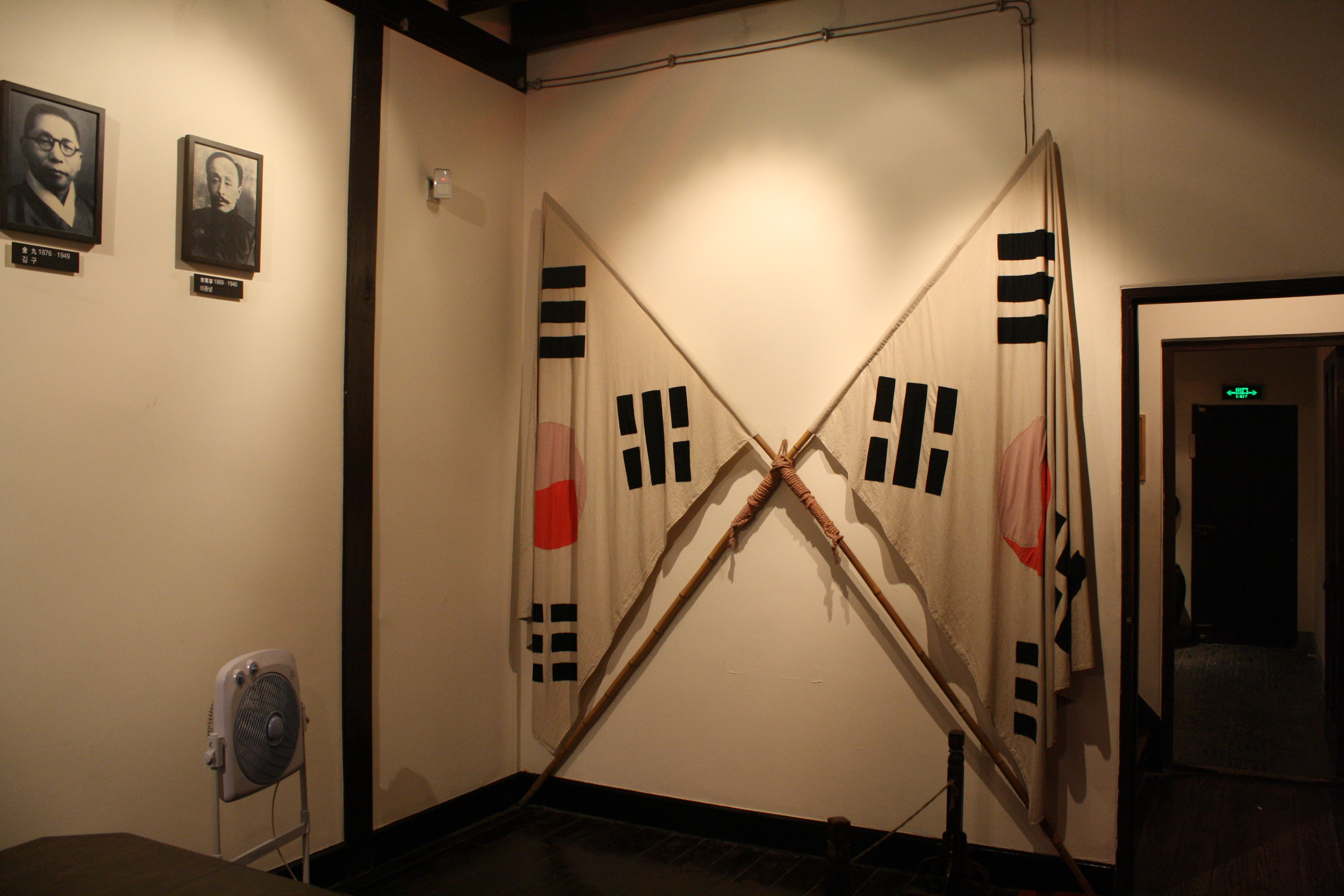
Taegeukgi in the Provisional Government headquarters in Shanghai

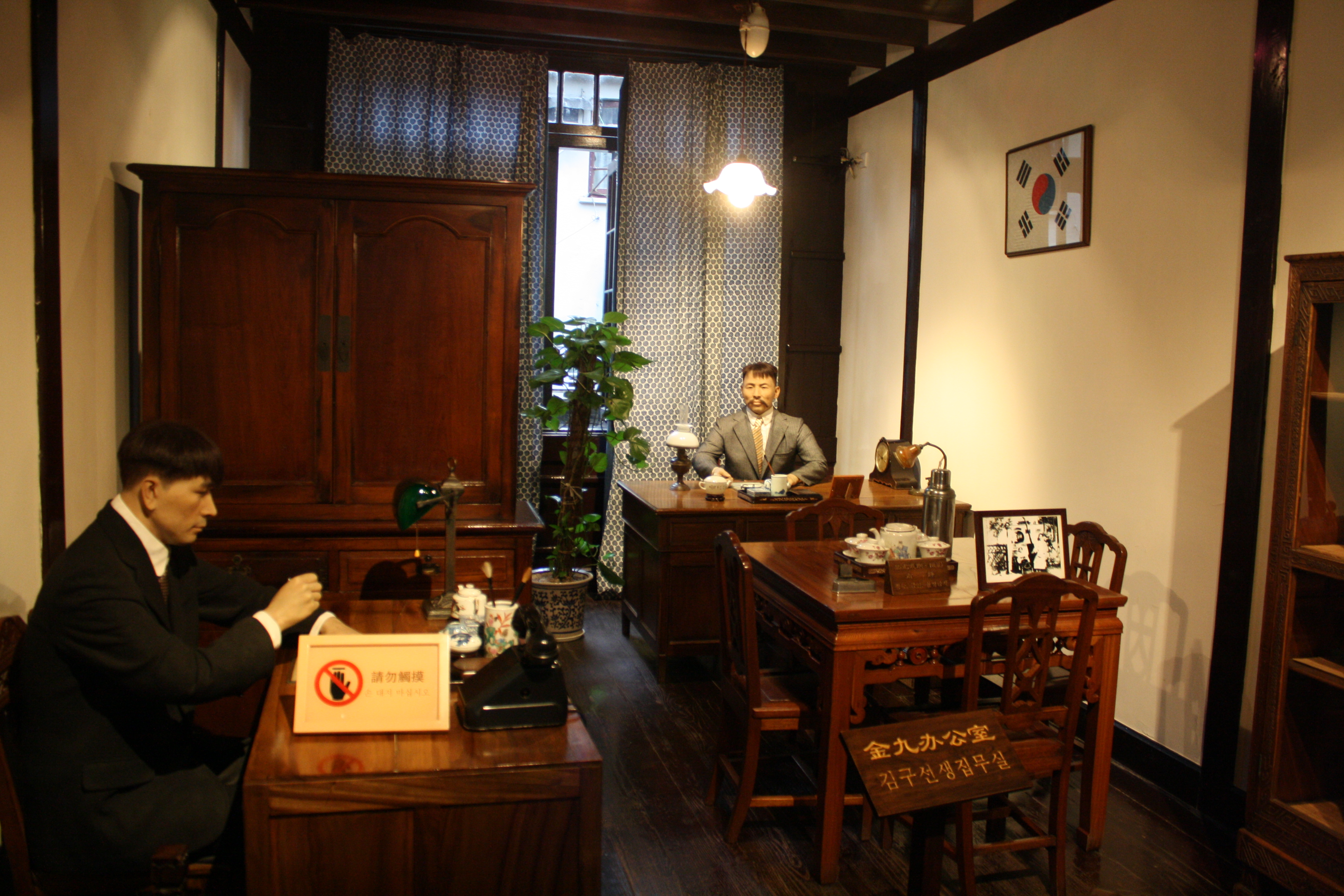
Office of Kim Ku in the Provisional Government headquarters in Shanghai

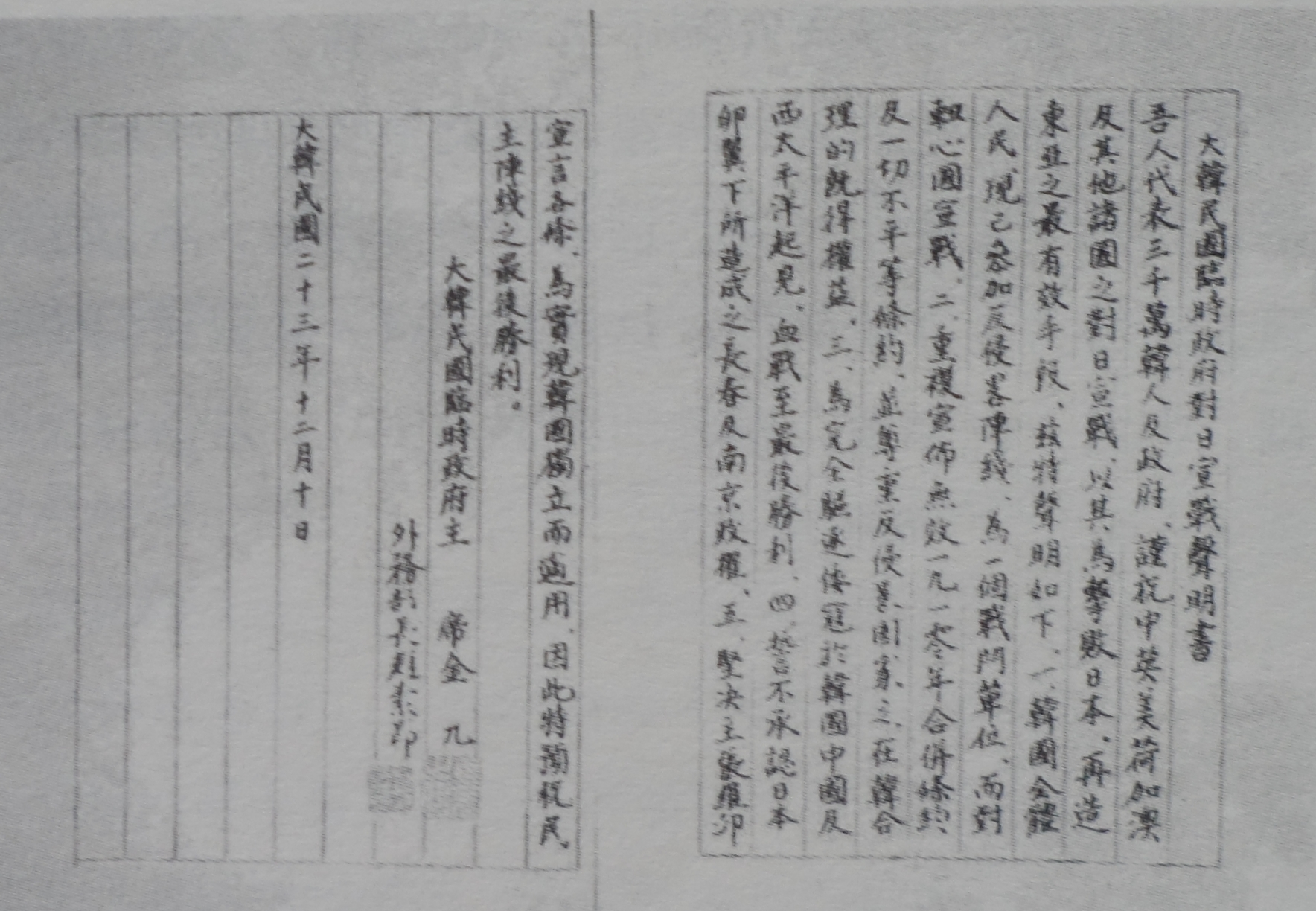
Declaration of war against the Axis powers by the Provisional Government

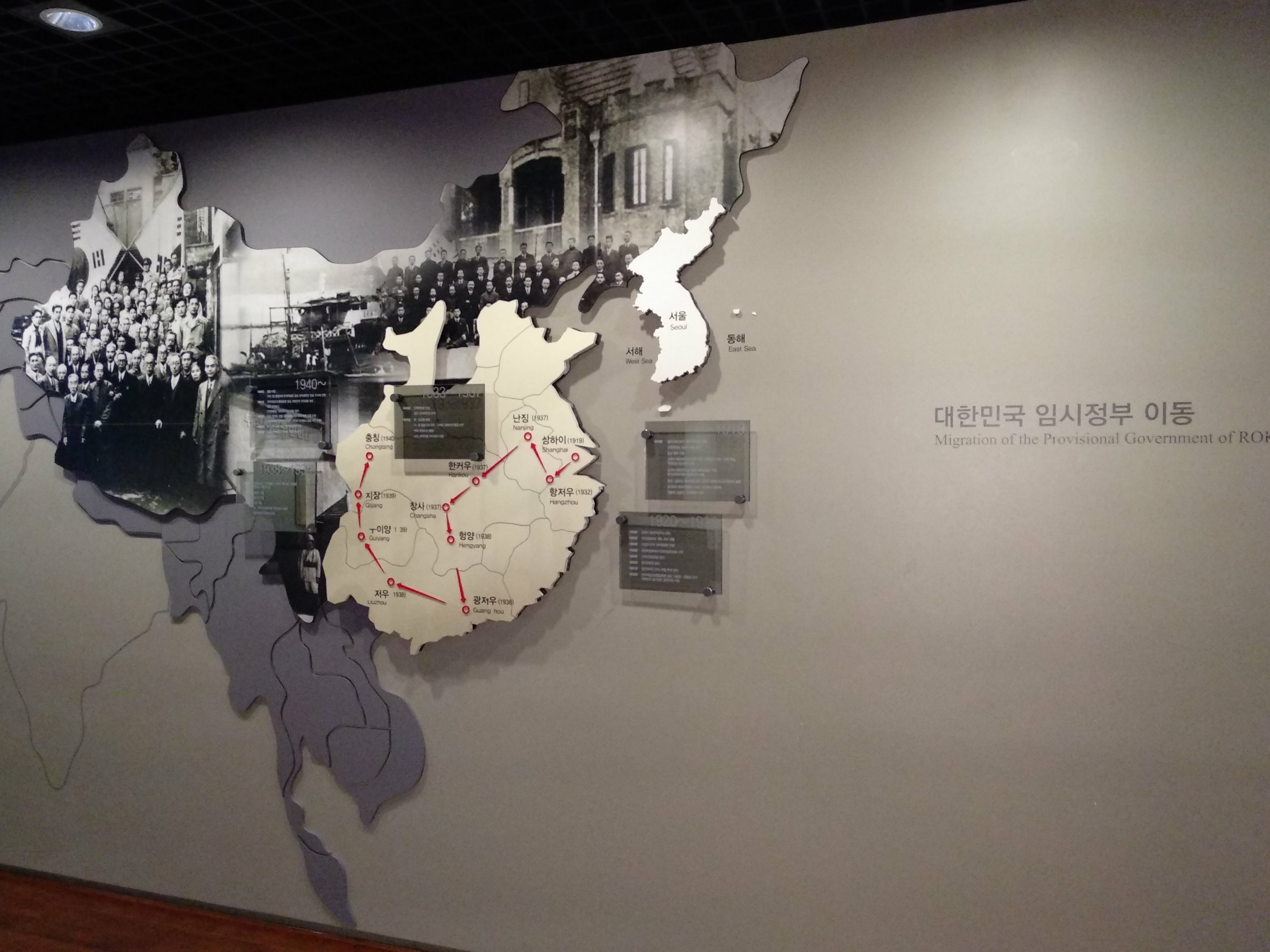
Migration map of the Provisional Government

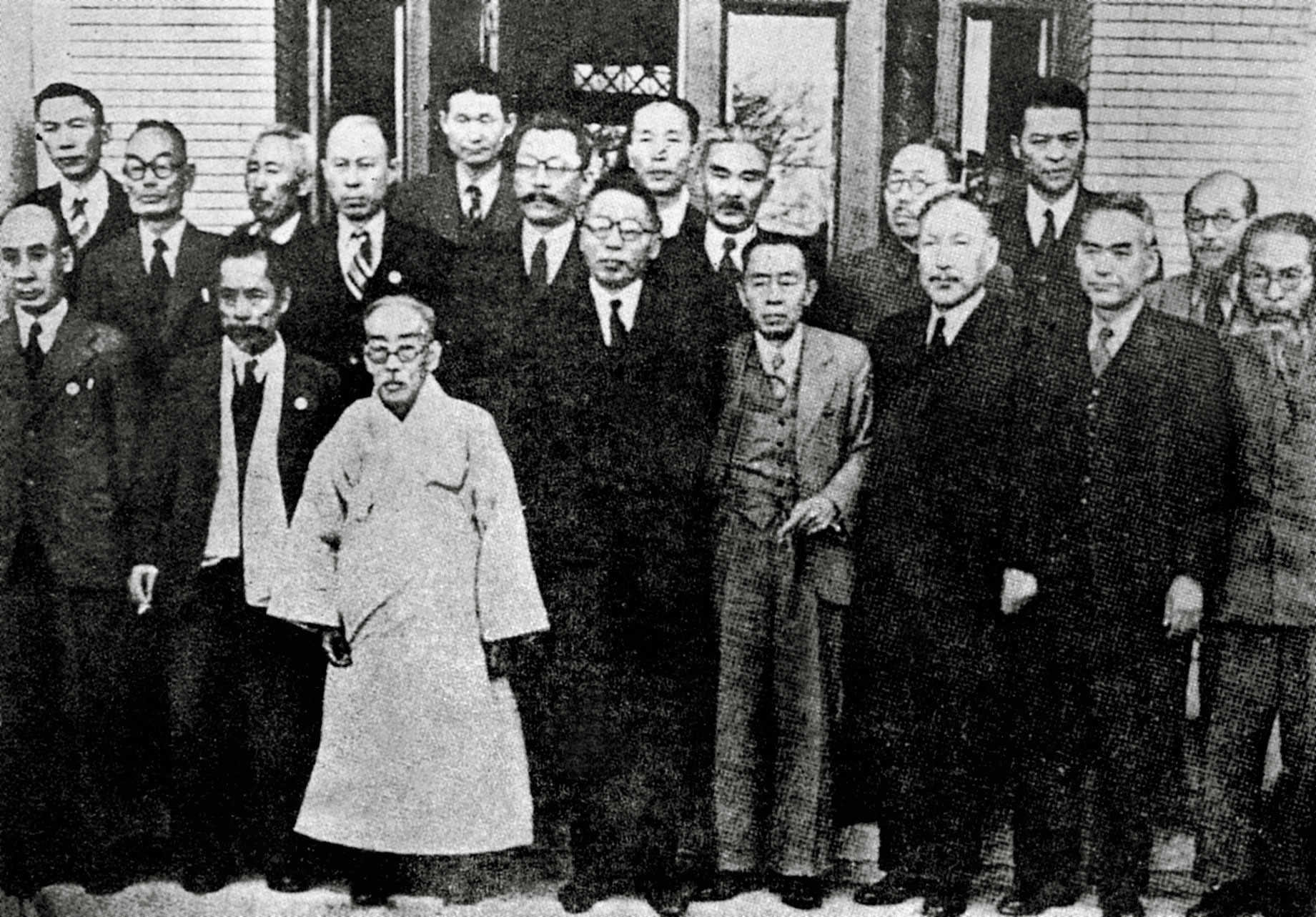
December 3, 1945. A photograph commemorating the return of the Provisional Government leaders

== See also ==
- Korea under Japanese rule
- History of South Korea
- Korean independence movement
- White Shirts Society
- Kwŏnŏphoe
- Cairo Conference
- Potsdam Conference
- Overrun Countries series
- Memorial Day
- Three Principles of the Equality
- Gyeonggyojang
- National Memorial of the Korean Provisional Government
- Provisional Government of the Republic of Korea Memorial Hall
