= Yi Tongnyŏng =

Korean independence activist (1869–1940)

Yi Dongnyeong
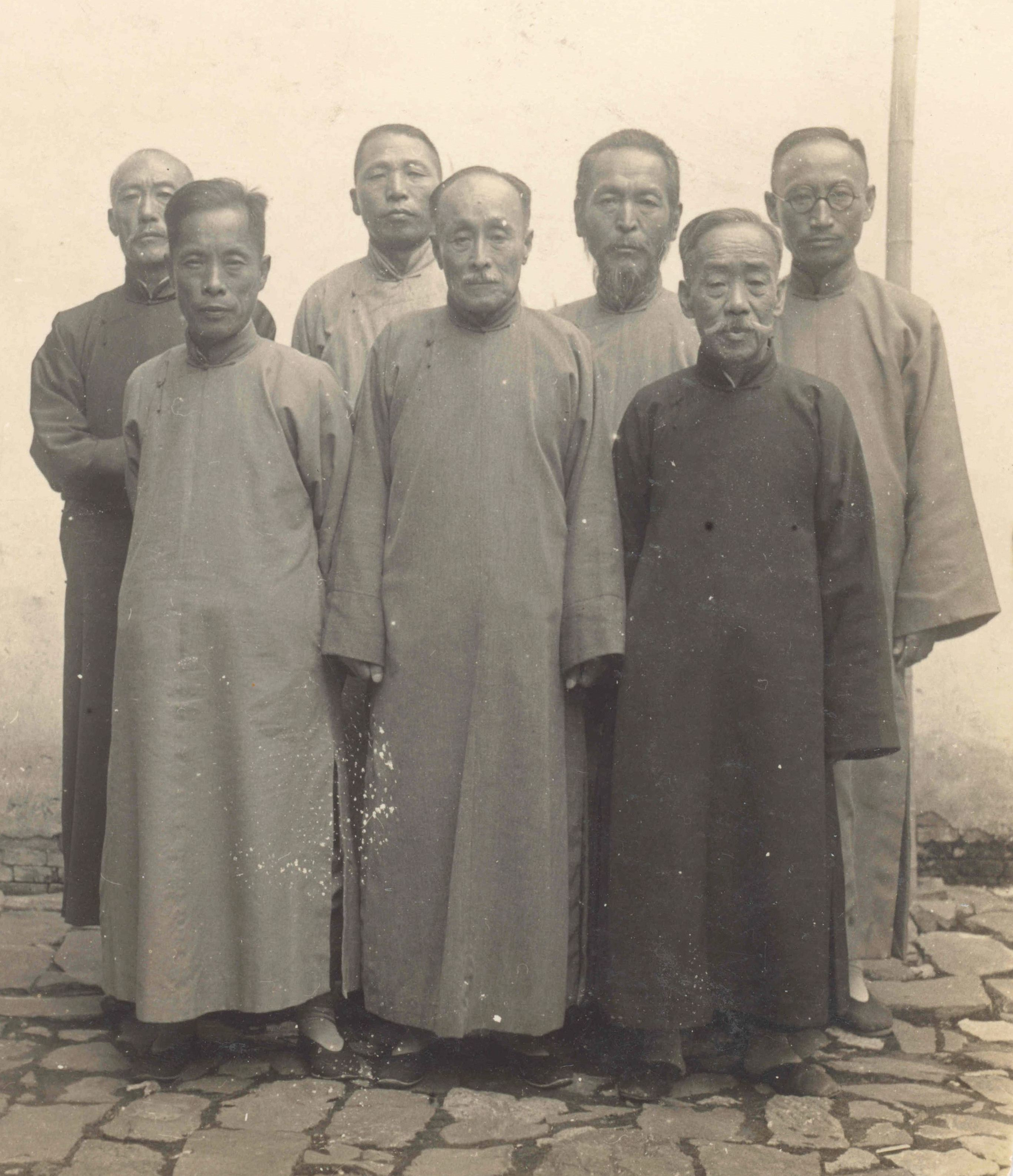
- Yi Dong-nyeong in the centre

5th President of the Provisional Government of the Republic of Korea
- In office April 29, 1926 – May 3, 1926
- Preceded by: Yang Gi-tak
- Succeeded by: Ahn Changho

7th President of the Provisional Government of the Republic of Korea
- In office May 16, 1926 – July 7, 1926
- Preceded by: Ahn Changho
- Succeeded by: Hong Jin

10th President of the Provisional Government of the Republic of Korea
- In office August, 1927 – June 24, 1933
- Preceded by: Kim Ku
- Succeeded by: Song Byeong-jo

12th President of the Provisional Government of the Republic of Korea
- In office October,1933 – March 13, 1940
- Preceded by: Song Byeong-jo
- Succeeded by: Kim Ku

Personal details
- Born: October 6, 1869 Cheonan, Joseon
- Died: March 13, 1940 (aged 70) Sichuan Province, China

Korean name
- Hangul: 이동녕
- Hanja: 李東寧
- RR: I Dongnyeong
- MR: I Tongnyŏng

Yi Dongnyeong (also spelled Yi Dong-nyung; 6 October 1869 – 13 March 1940) was a Korean independence activist. He served as the fourth (1926), seventh (1927–1930), eighth (1930–1933), tenth (1935–1939), and eleventh (1939–1940) President of the Provisional Government of the Republic of Korea in exile in Shanghai, China.

Yi Dongnyeong, along with Yi Si-yeong, Yi Hoeyŏng and Yi Sangnyong, started the Sinhŭng Military Academy.

After the establishment of the Korean Provisional Government in 1919, he participated in it until his death.

He died at 4:40pm on 13 March 1940, on the second floor of the Provisional Government headquarters in Chongqing. He had spent ten days in bed, suffering from pneumonia, and had previously suffered from asthma for years before his death.

== Notes ==
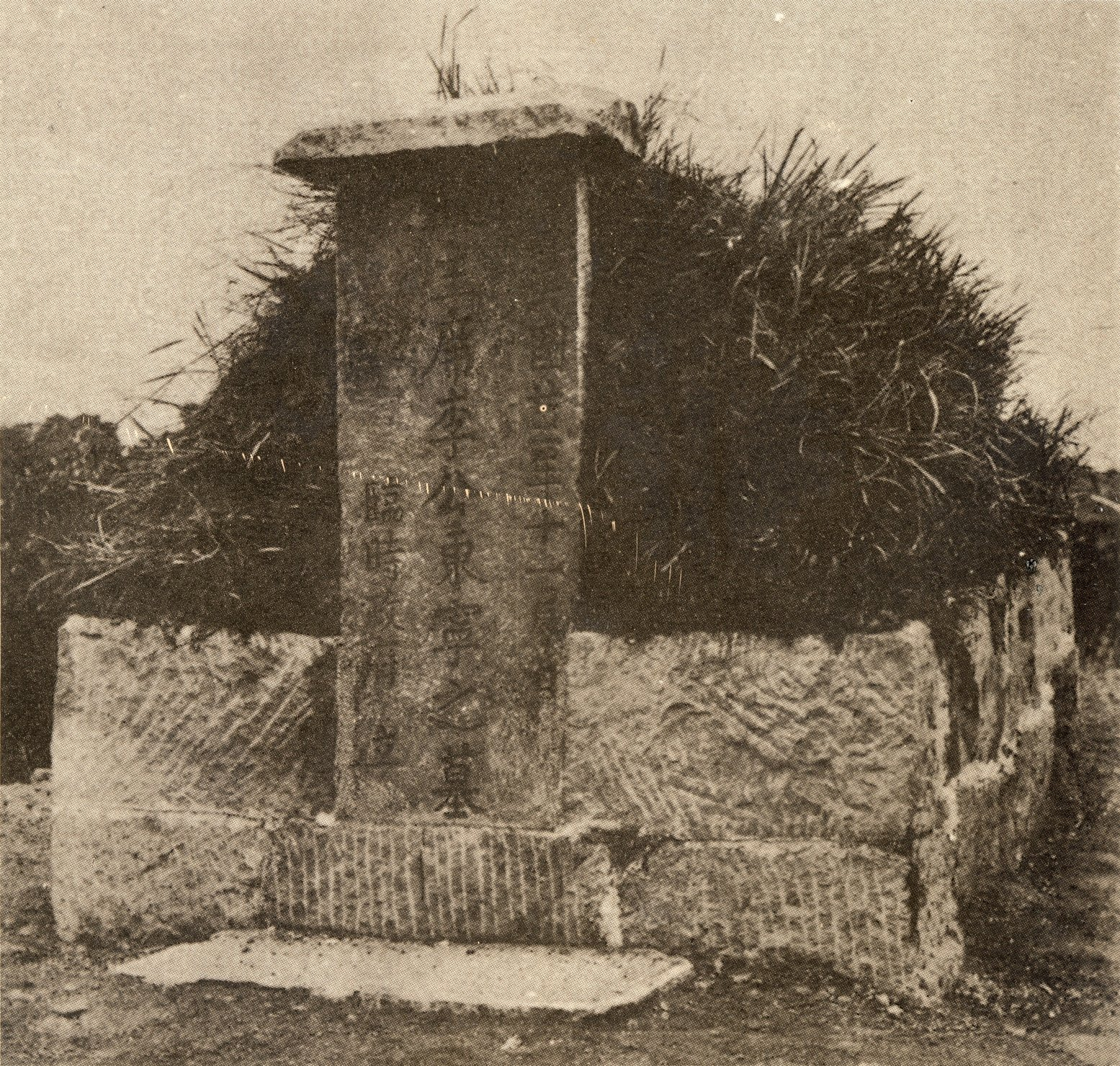
Tomb of Yi Dong-nyung in Qijiang County, Chongqing

Political offices
| Preceded by Yang Gi-tak | Presidents of Provisional Government of the Republic of Korea; 1926 | Succeeded by Ahn Changho |
| Preceded by Ahn Changho | Presidents of Provisional Government of the Republic of Korea; 1926 | Succeeded by Hong Jin |
| Preceded by Kim Ku | Presidents of Provisional Government of the Republic of Korea; 1927–1933 | Succeeded by Song Byeong-jo |
| Preceded by Song Byeong-jo | Presidents of Provisional Government of the Republic of Korea; 1933–1940 | Succeeded by Kim Ku |
