= Yi Sangnyong =

Korean independence activist (1858–1932)

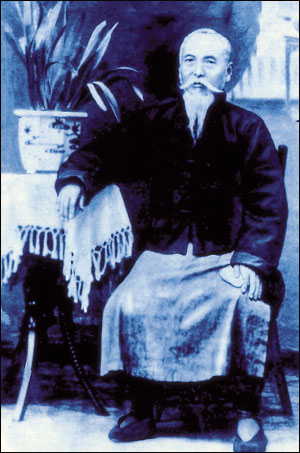

3rd President of the Provisional Government of the Republic of Korea
- In office September, 1925 – January, 1926
- Preceded by: Park Eunsik
- Succeeded by: Yang Gi-tak

Personal details
- Born: November 24, 1858 Andong, Gyeongsang-do, Joseon
- Died: June 15, 1932 (aged 73) Jilin, Manchuria

Korean name
- Hangul: 이상룡
- Hanja: 李相龍
- RR: I Sangryong
- MR: I Sangnyong

Yi Sangnyong (Korean: 이상룡; Hanja: 李相龍; November 24, 1858 – June 15, 1932) was a Korean Liberation activist, serving as the third president of the Provisional Government of the Republic of Korea from 1925 to 1926. Yi Sangnyong, along with Yi Si-yeong and Yi Tongnyŏng, started the Sinhŭng Military Academy in 1911. He participated in the Korean independence movement.

== Notes ==
Political offices
Preceded by Park Eun-sik	Presidents of Provisional Government of the Republic of Korea; 1925-1926	Succeeded by Yang Gi-tak
