= Yang Kit'ak =

Korean independence activist (1871–1938)

The Right Honourable Yang Kit'ak
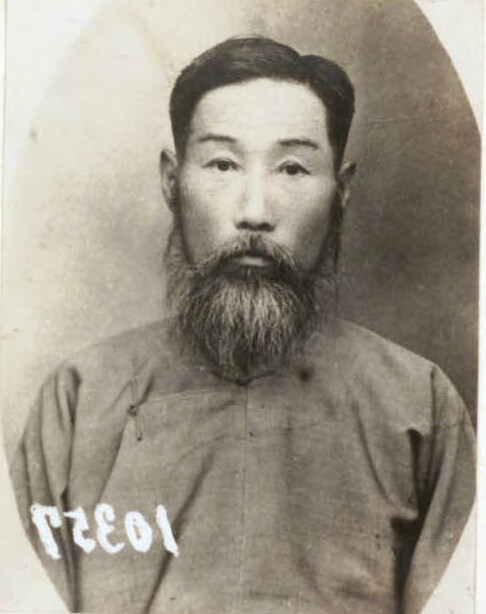

4th President of the Provisional Government of the Republic of Korea
- In office January, 1926 – April 29, 1926
- Preceded by: Yi Sang-ryong
- Succeeded by: Yi Dongnyeong

Prime Minister of the Provisional Government of the Republic of Korea
- In office October, 1933 – October, 1935
- Preceded by: Kim Ku
- Succeeded by: Ryu Dong-ryeol

Personal details
- Born: April 2, 1871 Kangsŏ, P'yŏngan-do, Joseon
- Died: April 20, 1938 (aged 67) Zhenjiang, Jiangsu, China

Korean name
- Hangul: 양기탁
- Hanja: 梁起鐸
- RR: Yang Gitak
- MR: Yang Kit'ak

Art name
- Hangul: 우강
- Hanja: 雩岡
- RR: Ugang
- MR: Ugang

Yang Kit'ak (Korean: 양기탁; Hanja: 梁起鐸; April 2, 1871 – April 20, 1938) was one of the leaders of Korean independence movement who served as the 9th president of the Provisional Government of the Republic of Korea from 1933 to 1935.

== The Korea Daily News ==
In 1904, Yang and British journalist Ernest Bethell first published Daehan Maeil Sinbo (대한매일신보), the newspaper publicly opposed Japanese actions in Korea. He and the newspaper played a significant role in the National Debt Repayment Movement.

== New People's Association ==
In 1907, Yang played a key role in organizing the New People's Association to promote industry and Korean independence.

== Notes ==
Political offices
Preceded by Yi Sang-ryong	Presidents of Provisional Government of the Republic of Korea; 1926	Succeeded by Yi Dongnyeong
Preceded by Kim Ku	Vice Presidents of Provisional Government of the Republic of Korea; 1933-1935	Succeeded by Ryu Dong-ryeol
