= List of presidents of South Korea =

Presidential standard and seal of the president of the Republic of Korea
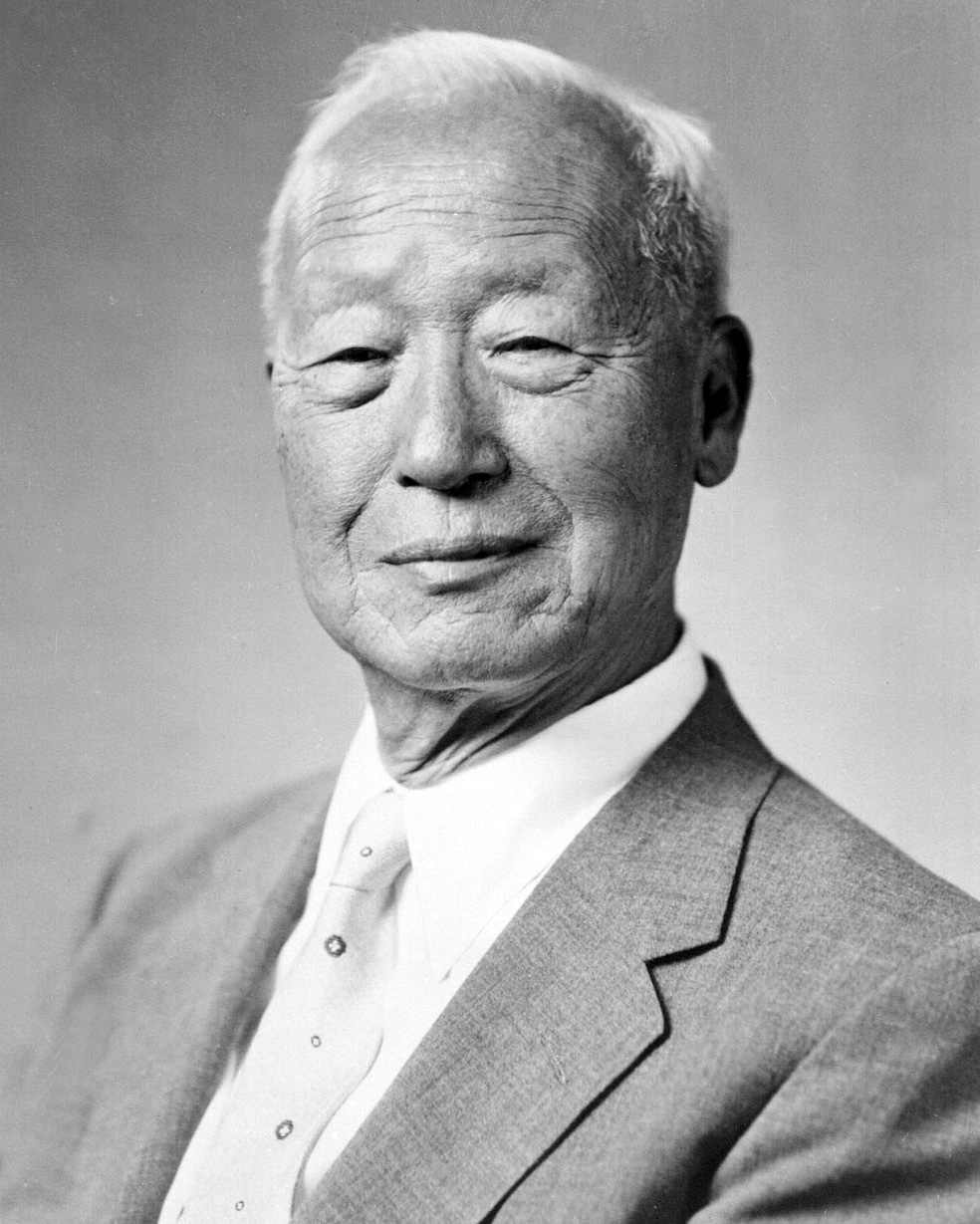
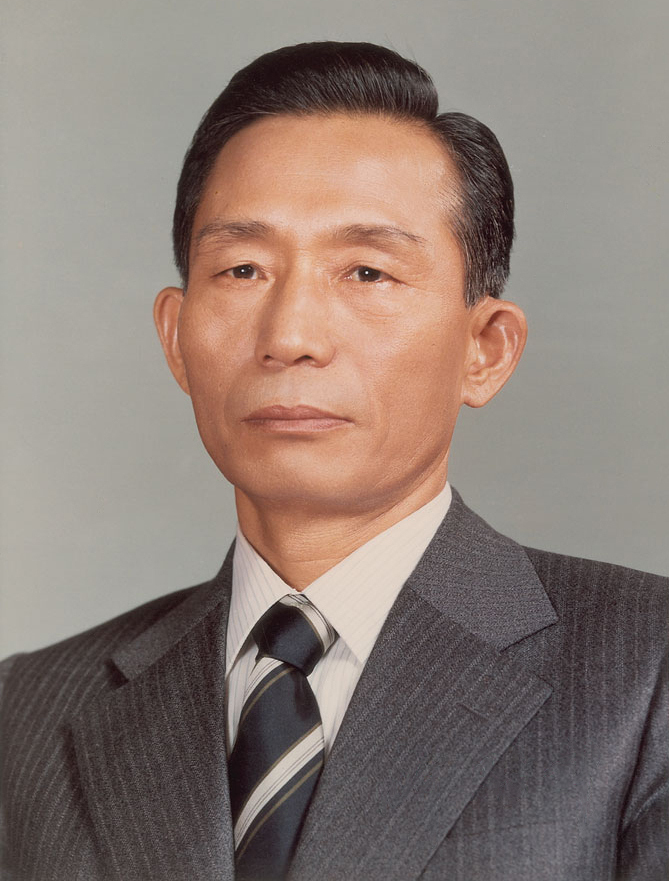
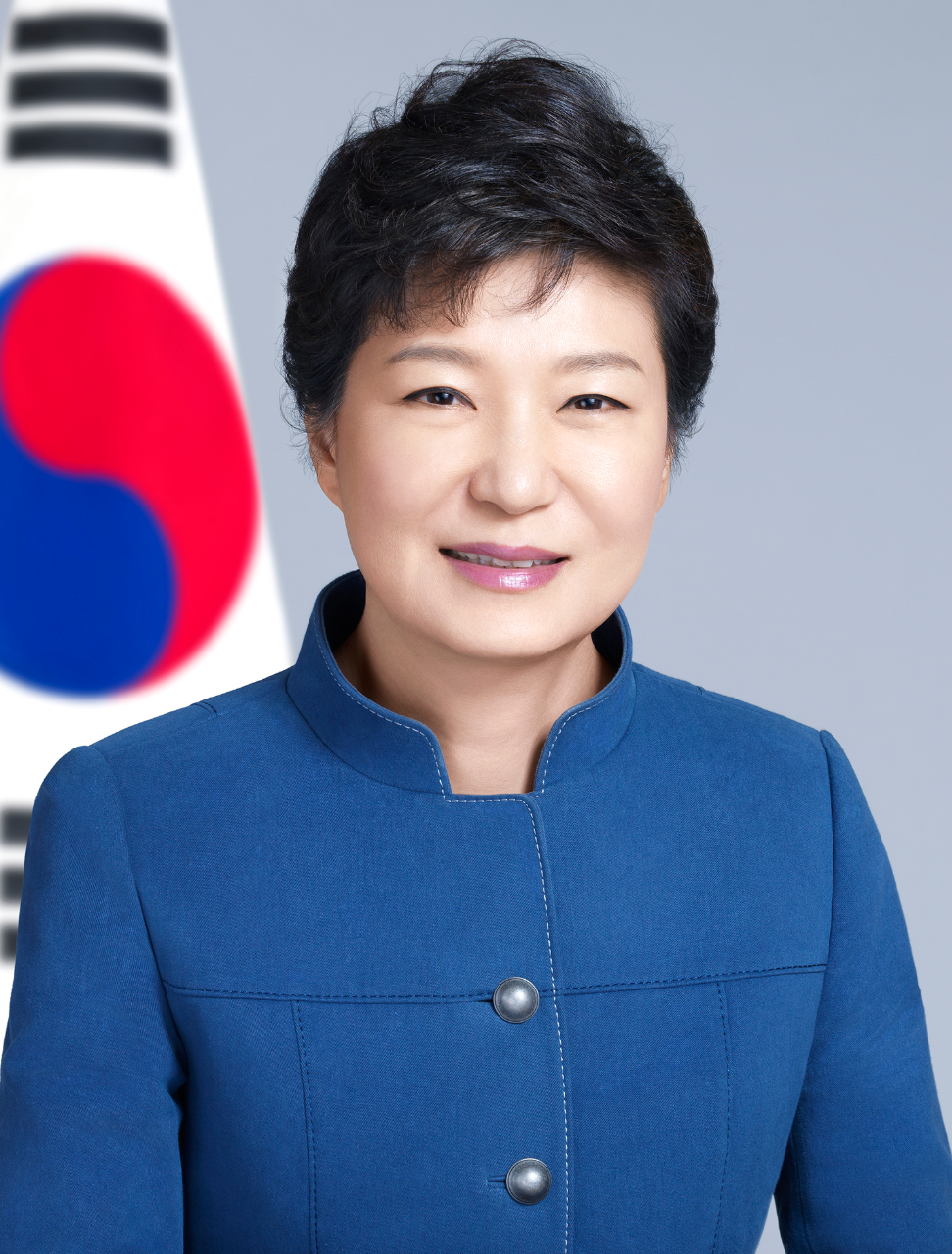
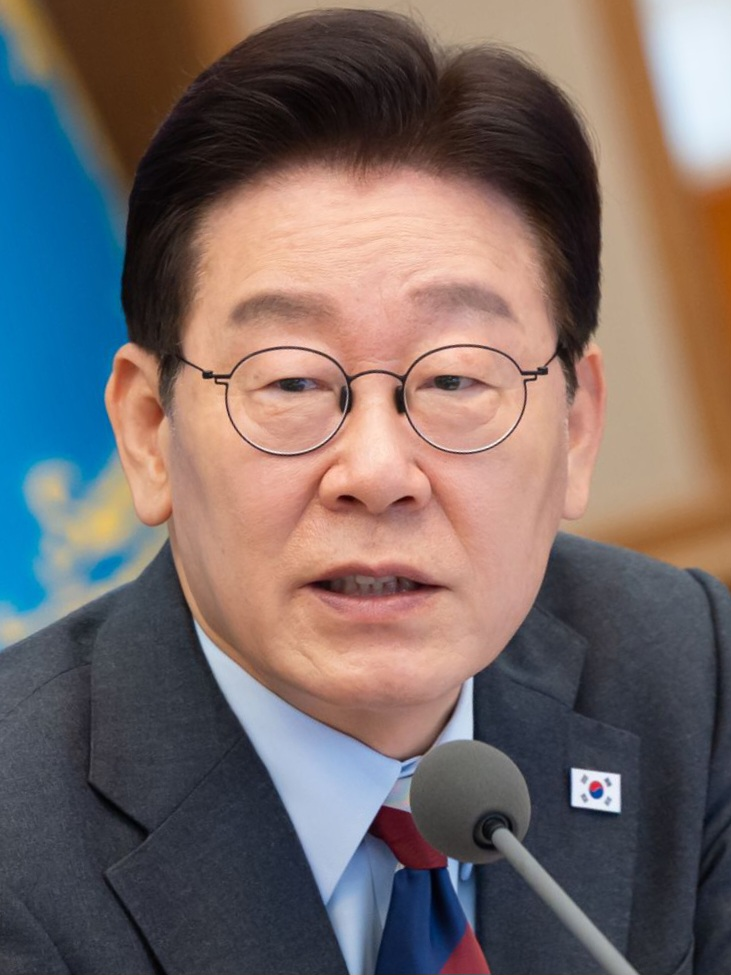
- Top left: Syngman Rhee was the first president.
- Top right: Park Chung Hee was the longest-serving president.
- Bottom left: Park Geun Hye was the first female president.
- Bottom right: Lee Jae Myung is the current president.

The president of the Republic of Korea serves as the chief executive of the government of the Republic of Korea and the commander-in-chief of the Republic of Korea Armed Forces.

The South Korean government constitutionally considers the Korean Provisional Government (KPG) to be its predecessor. The KPG was established in 1919 as a government in exile in Shanghai during the Japanese occupation of Korea. It had nine different heads of state between September 1919 and August 1948.

Under the 1988 Constitution of the Sixth Republic of Korea, the presidential term is set at five years with no re-election. The president must be a South Korean citizen, at least 40 years old, who has lived in South Korea for 5 years. The term was previously set at four years during the First Republic from 1948 to 1960, including a two-term limit that was repealed in 1954. The presidency was changed into a ceremonial role elected by legislators to five-year terms during the Second Republic from 1960 to 1963. The Third Republic returned the presidency to a directly-elected position with a four-year term in 1963 and repealed the two-term limit in 1969. Under the Yushin Constitution of the Fourth Republic adopted in 1972, the presidency became an indirectly elected position with six-year terms and no limits to re-election. It was replaced with a seven-year term under the Fifth Republic in 1981, which retained the indirect elections but prohibited a second term.

As of 2025, fourteen people have served in full capacity as president of South Korea since the office was formally established on 24 July 1948, when Rhee Syng-man took office after being elected by the Constituent National Assembly. The longest-serving president is Park Chung Hee, who held the office for nearly 16 years from 1963 until his assassination in 1979 following a period of authoritarian rule. The first and only woman to hold the presidency was his daughter Park Geun-hye, who was elected in 2012 and removed from office in 2017 after her impeachment was upheld by the Constitutional Court of Korea.

Lee Jae Myung assumed office on 4 June 2025 following the impeachment of his elected predecessor, Yoon Suk Yeol, by the National Assembly on 14 December 2024 after his martial law declaration. His powers were suspended until his impeachment was upheld by the Constitutional Court on 4 April 2025, which formally ended Yoon's presidency. Lee was elected in the 2025 presidential election.

== Presidents ==
| No. | Portrait | Name (Birth–Death) | Term | | | Party | Election |
| No. | Portrait | Name (Birth–Death) | Took office | Left office | Time in office | Party | Election |
First Republic (1948–1960)
| 1 | | Syngman Rhee 이승만 李承晩 (1875–1965) | 24 July 1948 | 27 April 1960 (Note: Syngman Rhee resigned on 27 April 1960, as a result of the April Revolution.) | 11 years, 278 days | National Association (until 1951) | 1948 |
| 1 | | Syngman Rhee 이승만 李承晩 (1875–1965) | 24 July 1948 | 27 April 1960 | 11 years, 278 days | Liberal (from 1951) | 1948 |
| 1 | | Syngman Rhee 이승만 李承晩 (1875–1965) | 24 July 1948 | 27 April 1960 | 11 years, 278 days | Liberal (from 1951) | 1952 |
| 1 | | Syngman Rhee 이승만 李承晩 (1875–1965) | 24 July 1948 | 27 April 1960 | 11 years, 278 days | Liberal (from 1951) | 1956 |
| 1 | | Syngman Rhee 이승만 李承晩 (1875–1965) | 24 July 1948 | 27 April 1960 | 11 years, 278 days | Liberal (from 1951) | Mar. 1960 |
| — | | Ho Chong 허정 許政 (1896–1988); Acting | 27 April 1960 | 15 June 1960 | 49 days | Independent | — (Note: Prime minister serving as acting president.) |
Second Republic (1960–1961)
| — | | Kwak Sang-hoon 곽상훈 郭尙勳 (1896–1980); Acting | 16 June 1960 | 23 June 1960 | 7 days | Democratic (1955) | — (Note: Speaker of the National Assembly serving as acting president.) |
| — | | Ho Chong 허정 許政 (1896–1988); Acting | 23 June 1960 | 8 August 1960 | 46 days | Independent | — |
| — | | Baek Nak-jun 백낙준 白樂濬 (1895–1985); Acting | 8 August 1960 | 13 August 1960 | 5 days | Independent | — (Note: President of the House of Councillors serving as acting president.) |
| 2 | | Yun Po-sun 윤보선 尹潽善 (1897–1990) | 13 August 1960 | 16 May 1961 | 276 days | Democratic (1955) | Aug. 1960 |
Supreme Council for National Reconstruction (1961–1963)
| 2 | | Yun Po-sun 윤보선 尹潽善 (1897–1990) | 16 May 1961 | 24 March 1962 (Note: Yun Po-sun resigned on 24 March 1962, in the aftermath of the May 16 coup.) | 312 days | Democratic (1955) | — |
| — | | Park Chung Hee 박정희 朴正熙 (1917–1979); Acting | 24 March 1962 | 17 December 1963 | 1 year, 268 days | Military | — (Note: Chairman of the Supreme Council for National Reconstruction serving as acting president.) |
Third Republic (1963–1972)
| 3 | | Park Chung Hee 박정희 朴正熙 (1917–1979) | 17 December 1963 | 21 November 1972 | 8 years, 340 days | Democratic Republican | 1963 |
| 3 | | Park Chung Hee 박정희 朴正熙 (1917–1979) | 17 December 1963 | 21 November 1972 | 8 years, 340 days | Democratic Republican | 1967 |
| 3 | | Park Chung Hee 박정희 朴正熙 (1917–1979) | 17 December 1963 | 21 November 1972 | 8 years, 340 days | Democratic Republican | 1971 |
Fourth Republic (1972–1981)
| 3 | | Park Chung Hee 박정희 朴正熙 (1917–1979) | 21 November 1972 | 26 October 1979 (Note: Park Chung Hee was assassinated on 26 October 1979.) | 6 years, 339 days | Democratic Republican | 1972 |
| 3 | | Park Chung Hee 박정희 朴正熙 (1917–1979) | 21 November 1972 | 26 October 1979 | 6 years, 339 days | Democratic Republican | 1978 |
| — | | Choi Kyu-hah (Note: Choi Kyu-hah served as acting president from 26 October until 6 December 1979.) 최규하 崔圭夏 (1919–2006) | 26 October 1979 | 6 December 1979 | 41 days | Independent | — |
| 4 | | Choi Kyu-hah 최규하 崔圭夏 (1919–2006) | 6 December 1979 | 16 August 1980 (Note: Choi Kyu-hah resigned on 16 August 1980, in the aftermath of the Coup d'état of May Seventeenth.) | 254 days | Independent | 1979 |
| — | | Park Choong-hoon 박충훈 朴忠勳 (1919–2001); Acting | 16 August 1980 | 27 August 1980 | 11 days | Democratic Republican | — |
| 5 | | Chun Doo-hwan (Note: Chun Doo-hwan and Roh Tae-woo were affiliated with Hanahoe.) 전두환 全斗煥 (1931–2021) | 27 August 1980 | 24 February 1981 | 181 days | Military | 1980 |
Fifth Republic (1981–1988)
| 5 | | Chun Doo-hwan 전두환 全斗煥 (1931–2021) | 24 February 1981 | 25 February 1988 | 7 years, 1 day | Democratic Justice | 1981 |
(South Korea) Sixth Republic (1988–present)
| 6 | | Roh Tae-woo 노태우 盧泰愚 (1932–2021) | 25 February 1988 | 25 February 1993 | 5 years | Democratic Justice (until 1990) | 1987 |
| 6 | | Roh Tae-woo 노태우 盧泰愚 (1932–2021) | 25 February 1988 | 25 February 1993 | 5 years | Democratic Liberal (1990–1992) | 1987 |
| 6 | | Roh Tae-woo 노태우 盧泰愚 (1932–2021) | 25 February 1988 | 25 February 1993 | 5 years | Independent (from 1992) | 1987 |
| 7 | | Kim Young-sam 김영삼 金泳三 (1927–2015) | 25 February 1993 | 25 February 1998 | 5 years | Democratic Liberal (until 1995) | 1992 |
| 7 | | Kim Young-sam 김영삼 金泳三 (1927–2015) | 25 February 1993 | 25 February 1998 | 5 years | New Korea (1995–1997) | 1992 |
| 7 | | Kim Young-sam 김영삼 金泳三 (1927–2015) | 25 February 1993 | 25 February 1998 | 5 years | Independent (from 1997) | 1992 |
| 8 | | Kim Dae-jung 김대중 金大中 (1924–2009) | 25 February 1998 | 25 February 2003 | 5 years | National Congress (until 2000) | 1997 |
| 8 | | Kim Dae-jung 김대중 金大中 (1924–2009) | 25 February 1998 | 25 February 2003 | 5 years | Millenium Democratic (2000–2002) | 1997 |
| 8 | | Kim Dae-jung 김대중 金大中 (1924–2009) | 25 February 1998 | 25 February 2003 | 5 years | Independent (from 2002) | 1997 |
| 9 | | Roh Moo-hyun (Note: Roh Moo-hyun was suspended on 12 March 2004, after the National Assembly impeached him. Roh remained suspended until the Constitutional Court overturned the impeachment on 14 May 2004.) 노무현 盧武鉉 (1946–2009) | 25 February 2003 | 25 February 2008 | 5 years | Millenium Democratic (until 2003) | 2002 |
| 9 | | Roh Moo-hyun 노무현 盧武鉉 (1946–2009) | 25 February 2003 | 25 February 2008 | 5 years | Uri (2003–2007) | 2002 |
| 9 | | Roh Moo-hyun 노무현 盧武鉉 (1946–2009) | 25 February 2003 | 25 February 2008 | 5 years | Independent (from 2007) | 2002 |
| — | | Goh Kun (Note: Goh Kun served as acting president during Roh Moo-hyun's suspension.) 고건 高建 (born 1938); Acting | 12 March 2004 | 14 May 2004 | 63 days | Independent | — |
| 10 | | Lee Myung-bak 이명박 李明博 (born 1941) | 25 February 2008 | 25 February 2013 | 5 years | Grand National (until 2012) | 2007 |
| 10 | | Lee Myung-bak 이명박 李明博 (born 1941) | 25 February 2008 | 25 February 2013 | 5 years | Saenuri (from 2012) | 2007 |
| 11 | | Park Geun-hye 박근혜 朴槿惠 (born 1952) | 25 February 2013 | 10 March 2017 (Note: Park Geun-hye was suspended on 9 December 2016, after the National Assembly impeached her. Park remained suspended until she was removed from office on 10 March 2017, after the Constitutional Court upheld the impeachment.) | 4 years, 13 days | Saenuri (until 2017) | 2012 |
| 11 | | Park Geun-hye 박근혜 朴槿惠 (born 1952) | 25 February 2013 | 10 March 2017 | 4 years, 13 days | Liberty Korea (from 2017) | 2012 |
| — | | Hwang Kyo-ahn (Note: Hwang Kyo-ahn served as acting president during Park Geun-hye's suspension. After Park was removed from office, Hwang continued as acting president until Moon Jae-in was elected.) 황교안 黃敎安 (born 1957); Acting | 9 December 2016 | 10 May 2017 | 152 days | Independent | — |
| 12 | | Moon Jae-in 문재인 文在寅 (born 1953) | 10 May 2017 | 10 May 2022 | 5 years | Democratic (2015) | 2017 |
| 13 | | Yoon Suk Yeol 윤석열 尹錫悅 (born 1960) | 10 May 2022 | 4 April 2025 (Note: Yoon Suk Yeol was suspended on 14 December 2024, after the National Assembly impeached him. Yoon remained suspended until he was removed from office on 4 April 2025, after the Constitutional Court upheld the impeachment.) | 2 years, 329 days | People Power | 2022 |
| — | | Han Duck-soo (Note: Han Duck-soo became acting president after Yoon Suk Yeol was impeached on 14 December 2024. Han was later impeached by the National Assembly on 27 December.) 한덕수 韓悳洙 (born 1949); Acting | 14 December 2024 | 27 December 2024 | 13 days | Independent | — |
| — | | Choi Sang-mok (Note: Choi Sang-mok served as acting president during Han Duck-soo's suspension.) 최상목 崔相穆 (born 1963); Acting | 27 December 2024 | 24 March 2025 | 87 days | Independent | — (Note: Deputy prime minister serving as acting president.) |
| — | | Han Duck-soo (Note: Han Duck-soo was reinstated on 24 March 2025, after the Constitutional Court overturned his impeachment. After Yoon Suk Yeol was removed from office, Han continued as acting president, until resigning on 1 May 2025, to run in the 2025 presidential election.) 한덕수 韓悳洙 (born 1949); Acting | 24 March 2025 | 1 May 2025 | 38 days | Independent | — |
| — | | Lee Ju-ho (Note: Lee Ju-ho served as acting president after Han Duck-soo's resignation. Choi Sang-mok was expected to succeed Han as acting president, but he resigned on 1 May 2025, to avoid an impeachment vote by the National Assembly.) 이주호 李周浩 (born 1961); Acting | 2 May 2025 | 4 June 2025 | 33 days | Independent | — |
| 14 | | Lee Jae Myung 이재명 李在明 (born 1963) | 4 June 2025 | Incumbent | 1 year, 145 days | Democratic (2015) | 2025 |

== Timeline ==
| Ideology | # | Time in office | Name(s) |
|---|---|---|---|
| Conservative | 9 | 21770 days | Choi Kyu-hah, Chun Doo-hwan, Kim Young-sam, Lee Myung-bak, Park Chung Hee, Park Geun-hye, Roh Tae-woo, Syngman Rhee, and Yoon Suk Yeol |
| Liberal | 5 | 6578 days (Note: As of 27 October 2026.) | Kim Dae-jung, Moon Jae-in, Roh Moo-hyun, Yun Po-sun, and Lee Jae Myung |

Timeline of South Korean governments

== See also ==
- Government of South Korea
- List of presidents of South Korea by age
- List of monarchs of Korea
- List of presidents of South Korea by time in office
- List of presidents of the Provisional Government of the Republic of Korea
- List of prime ministers of South Korea
- Presidential elections in South Korea
- Provisional Government of the Republic of Korea
- Vice President of South Korea
