= Seoul Spring =

Period of democratization in South Korea (1979–1980)

The Seoul Spring (Korean: 서울의 봄) was a period of democratization in South Korea from 26 October 1979 to 17 May 1980. This expression was derived from the Prague Spring of Czechoslovakia in 1968.

On the night of 26 October 1979, President Park Chung Hee was assassinated by Kim Jae-gyu, the director of the Korean Central Intelligence Agency (KCIA) and his own security chief. Bringing an end to 18 years under Park's dictatorship, it signaled the possibility for constitutional reform and democratization movements started to call for an end to the Yushin Constitution. Immediately after his death became public, Choi Kyu-hah, then Prime Minister, became acting president under Article 48 of the Yushin Constitution. He declared martial law, with the exception of Jeju, and General Jeong Seung-hwa, the Army Chief of Staff, thereby became the government's chief administrator. Major General Chun Doo-hwan, chief of the Military Security Command (MSC), was appointed the same day to lead a Joint Investigation Headquarters into the death of the president; through this position Chun was able to assume control of the KCIA and the government intelligence apparatus.

The National Conference for Unification nominated Choi Kyu-hah, then Prime Minister, to succeed Park and he became South Korea's fourth president after the election on 6 December. He promised reform and a return of direct democratic elections. Only six days later, on 12 December, Chun arrested and detained General Jeong, launching the coup d'état of December Twelfth to take full control over the military. Since Choi was still in power, Chun had no direct influence over domestic politics yet. The protests for democratization continued and culminated in the 15 May 1980 demonstration against martial law at Seoul Station which involved 100,000 protesters, mostly students. After news about military intervention, they decided to back down in fear of violent confrontation.

Chun launched another coup d'état on May Seventeenth 1980 and established a military dictatorship under the National Council for Reunification. Martial law was extended to the whole country and he dissolved the National Assembly. He installed himself as Director of the KCIA. Universities were closed, political activities were banned, and the press was curtailed while troops and special warfare force were dispatched to cities all over the country to enforce the martial law. Student union leaders had gathered that same day to discuss plans for new protests but were arrested by a DSC raid while opposition leader and future president Kim Dae-jung and twenty-five other politicians were also apprehended on charges of instigating social unrest. The following day, the Gwangju Uprising began with students calling for the opening of university and democratization. In response, Chun cut off all communications from Gwangju and used propaganda to depict the protests in Gwangju as the result of communist and Northern instigators. He violently suppressed the protest by sending in military forces with estimates of the death toll ranging between 600 and 3500 victims, effectively bringing an end to the Seoul Spring.

== Cultural references ==
=== Film ===
- May 18 (2007)
- A Taxi Driver (2017)
- The Man Standing Next (2020)
- 12.12: The Day (2023)

=== Television ===
- Sandglass (1995)
- 4th Republic (1995–96)
- 5th Republic (2005)
- Youth of May (2021)

== See also ==
- Prague Spring
- Assassination of Park Chung Hee
- Coup d'état of December Twelfth
- Coup d'état on May Seventeenth
- Gwangju Massacre
- Fifth Republic of Korea
