= Presidential elections in South Korea =

Since the establishment of the First Republic in 1948, there have been 22 elections for president of South Korea (including the March 1960 election, whose results were invalidated after the April Revolution).

Prior to the Presidential Election Act of 1987, the elections were indirect. Since 1987, the president is elected directly by the public using plurality-with-primaries in a single, non-renewable five-year term.

== Procedure (1987–present) ==
The presidential election rules are defined by the South Korean Constitution and the Public Official Election Act.

=== Election campaign ===
The election campaign period, as set by the Election Law, is short – 23 days. According to the book Internet Election Campaigns in the United States, Japan, South Korea, and Taiwan, the election campaign periods in Korea (23 days for presidential elections and 14 days for National Assembly elections) were made intentionally short in order to "prevent excessive campaign spending for long-running election campaigns and harmful effects from overheated elections", but, on the downside, "this works against new candidates who are not well known".

=== Popular vote ===
The president is elected by direct popular vote, It is conducted in a single round on a first-past-the-post basis.

== Summary of past presidential elections ==
Winning party ideology: Conservative · Liberal · Independent

#	Year	Winner	2nd	3rd	Notes
First Republic
President and vice president elected indirectly by the National Assembly
1	1948	Syngman Rhee; NARRKI (91.8%)	Kim Koo; Korea Independence (6.7%)		In the vice-presidential election, Yi Si-yeong (NARRKI) won over Kim Koo by 57.4% to 33.0%.
President and vice president elected by popular vote
2	1952	Syngman Rhee; Liberal (74.6%)	Cho Bong-am; Independent (11.4%)	Yi Si-yeong; Democratic Nationalist (10.9%)	The election took place during the Korean War. In the vice-presidential election, independent Ham Tae-young won the election with 41.3%, defeating Liberal candidate Lee Beom-seok (25.5%) and Democratic Nationalist Chough Pyung-ok (8.1%).
3	1956	Syngman Rhee; Liberal (70.0%)	Cho Bong-am; Independent (30.0%)		In the vice-presidential election, Democratic Party candidate Chang Myon defeated Lee Ki-poong (Liberal) by 46.4% to 44.0%.
–	Mar; 1960	Syngman Rhee; Liberal (100%)			Rhee re-elected unopposed due to the death of his Democratic Party opponent Chough Pyung-ok. In the vice-presidential election, Lee Ki-poong (Liberal) won with 79.2% over Chang Myon (Democratic) with 17.5%. The results of both elections were annulled as fraudulent after the April Revolution.
Second Republic
President elected indirectly by both houses of the National Assembly; Vice Presidency abolished
4	Aug; 1960	Yun Posun; Democratic (82.2%)	Kim Chang-sook; Independent (11.5%)		The only presidential election of the Second Republic.
Third Republic
President elected by popular vote
5	1963	Park Chung-hee; Democratic Republican (46.6%)	Yun Posun; Civil Rule (45.1%)		First election after the May 16 coup.
6	1967	Park Chung-hee; Democratic Republican (51.4%)	Yun Posun; New Democratic (40.9%)		
7	1971	Park Chung-hee; Democratic Republican (53.2%)	Kim Dae-jung; New Democratic (45.3%)		
Fourth Republic
President elected by the National Conference for Unification
8	1972	Park Chung-hee; Democratic Republican (100%)			First election after the October Yushin. Park re-elected unopposed.
9	1978	Park Chung-hee; Democratic Republican (100%)			Park re-elected unopposed.
10	1979	Choi Kyu-hah; Independent (100%)			First election after the assassination of Park Chung-hee. Acting President Choi elected as President unopposed.
11	1980	Chun Doo-hwan; Independent (100%)			First election after the coup d'état of December Twelfth. Chun elected unopposed.
Fifth Republic
President elected indirectly
12	1981	Chun Doo-hwan; Democratic Justice (90.2%)	Yu Chi-song; Democratic Korea (7.7%)		The only presidential election of the Fifth Republic.
Sixth Republic
President elected by popular vote
13	1987	Roh Tae-woo; Democratic Justice (36.6%)	Kim Young-sam; Reunification Democratic (28.0%)	Kim Dae-jung; Peace Democratic (27.0%)	First free and fair direct presidential election in South Korean history. Also the first election to feature a female candidate.
14	1992	Kim Young-sam; Democratic Liberal (42.0%)	Kim Dae-jung; Democratic (33.8%)	Chung Ju-yung; Unification National (16.3%)	
15	1997	Kim Dae-jung; National Congress (40.3%)	Lee Hoi-chang; Grand National (38.7%)	Lee In-je; New National (19.2%)	
16	2002	Roh Moo-hyun; Millennium Democratic (48.9%)	Lee Hoi-chang; Grand National (46.6%)		
17	2007	Lee Myung-bak; Grand National (48.7%)	Chung Dong-young; United New Democratic (26.1%)	Lee Hoi-chang; Independent (15.1%)	
18	2012	Park Geun-hye; Saenuri (51.6%)	Moon Jae-in; Democratic United (48.0%)		First female president elected in South Korean history. First election since democratization where a candidate won an absolute majority of the vote.
19	2017	Moon Jae-in; Democratic (41.1%)	Hong Joon-pyo; Liberty Korea (24.0%)	Ahn Cheol-soo; People's (21.4%)	Held after the impeachment and removal of Park Geun-hye.
20	2022	Yoon Suk Yeol; People Power (48.6%)	Lee Jae Myung; Democratic (47.8%)		
21	2025	Lee Jae Myung; Democratic (49.4%)	Kim Moon-soo; People Power (41.2%)	Lee Jun-seok; Reform (8.3%)	Held after the impeachment and removal of Yoon Suk Yeol.

== See also ==
- Elections in South Korea
