= List of presidents of South Korea by time in office =

Longest presidency	Shortest presidency
Park Chung Hee; 5,788 days (1963–1979)	Choi Kyu-hah; 254 days (1979–1980)

This is a list of presidents of South Korea by time in office. The basis of the list is the difference between dates; if counted by number of calendar days all the figures would be one greater.

Of the elected individuals, three resigned from office (Rhee Syng-man, Yun Po-sun, and Choi Kyu-hah,) one was assassinated (Park Chung Hee,) and two were impeached and removed (Yoon Suk Yeol and Park Geun-hye.)

Choi Kyu-hah spent the shortest time as president, while Park Chung Hee spent the longest. Park is the only president to have served more than three terms in office. Following the ratification of the Presidential Election Act of 1987, presidents—starting with Roh Tae-woo, have been limited to a single five-year term. Chun Doo-hwan, the incumbent in 1987, was blocked from serving a third term, which had he been re-elected, would last from 1988–1995.

While there have been 14 total presidents of South Korea, 21 terms have been served; Rhee, Park, and Chun Doo-hwan have served multiple terms.

== Rank by time in office ==
Key:

Dead
Living
Incumbent

Rank	President	Length of term	Order of presidency	Notes
1	Park Chung Hee	15 years, 313 days	3rd • 3 December 1963 – 26 October 1979	Served 5th, 6th, 7th, 8th, and 9th terms, died in office
2	Rhee Syng-man	11 years, 278 days	1st • 24 July 1948 – 27 April 1960	Served 1st, 2nd, and 3rd terms, resigned
3	Chun Doo-hwan	7 years, 177 days	5th • 1 September 1980 – 25 February 1988	Served 11th and 12th terms
4 tie	Kim Young-sam	5 years, 0 days	7th • 25 February 1993 – 25 February 1998	Served 14th term
4 tie	Kim Dae-jung	5 years, 0 days	8th • 25 February 1998 – 25 February 2003	Served 15th term
4 tie	Roh Moo-hyun	5 years, 0 days	9th • 25 February 2003 – 25 February 2008	Served 16th term
4 tie	Moon Jae-in	5 years, 0 days	12th • 10 May 2017 – 10 May 2022	Served 19th term
5 tie	Lee Myung-bak	4 years, 365 days	10th • 25 February 2008 – 25 February 2013	Served 17th term
5 tie	Roh Tae-woo	4 years, 365 days	6th • 25 February 1988 – 25 February 1993	Served 13th term
6	Park Geun-hye	4 years, 13 days	11th • 25 February 2013 – 10 March 2017	Served 18th term, impeached and removed from office
7	Yoon Suk Yeol	2 years, 329 days	13th • 10 May 2022 – 4 April 2025	Served 20th term, impeached and removed from office
8	Yun Bo-seon	1 year, 223 days	2nd • 13 August 1960 – 24 March 1962	Served 4th term, resigned
9	Lee Jae-myung (Note: As of February 13, 2026)	254 days	14th • 4 June 2025 – present	Serving 21st term
10	Choi Kyu-hah	254 days	4th • 6 December 1979 – 16 August 1980	Served 10th term, resigned

== See also ==
- List of presidents of South Korea
