= List of presidents of Korea =

List of presidents of Korea may refer to:

- List of presidents of South Korea
- List of presidents of North Korea
