= Shin Hyun-hwak =

South Korean politician (1920–2007)

- 신현확
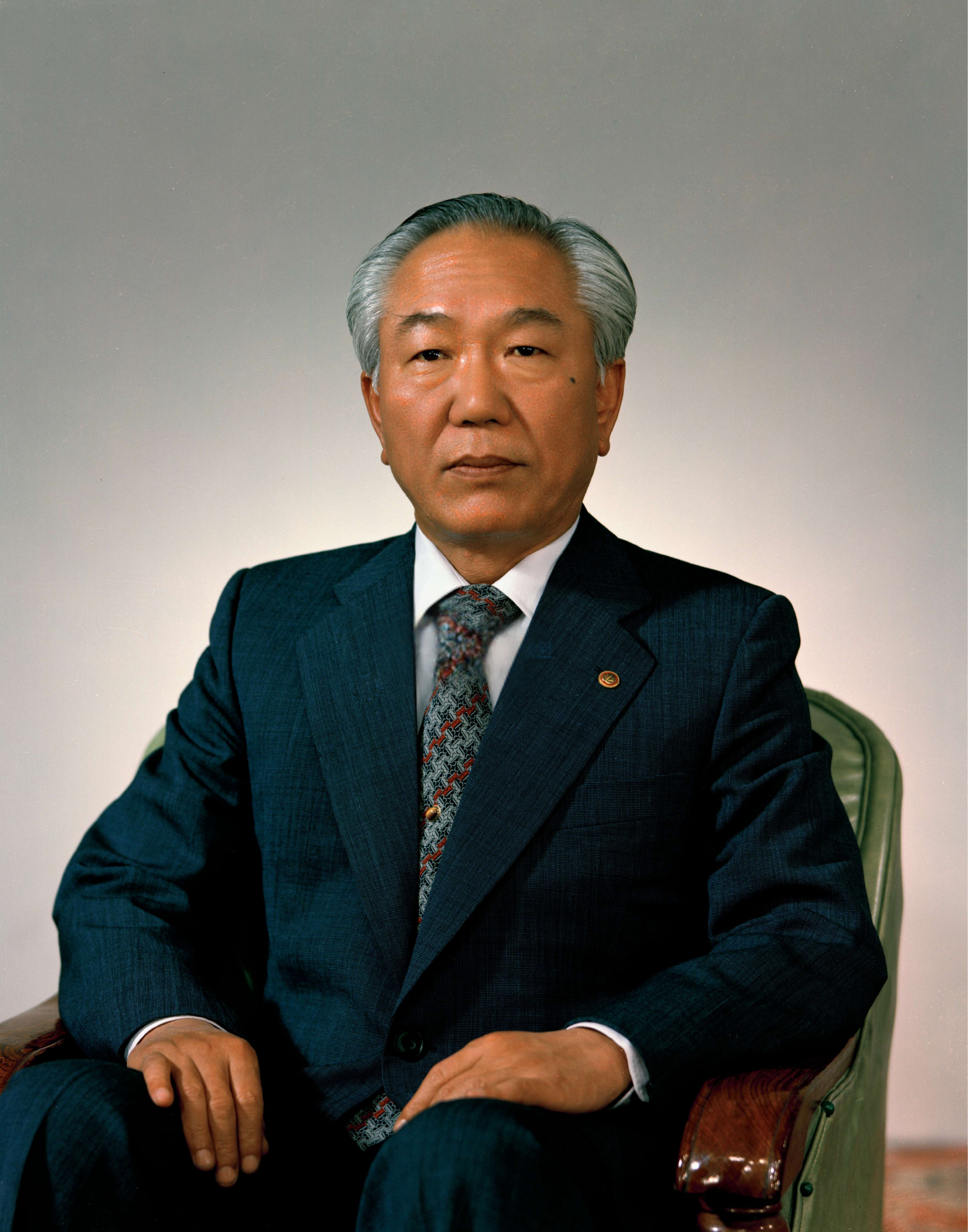
- Official portrait, 1980

13th Prime Minister of South Korea
- In office 12 December 1979 – 21 May 1980
- President: Choi Kyu-hah
- Preceded by: Choi Kyu-hah
- Succeeded by: Park Choong-hoon (acting)
- Acting; 15 November 1979 – 22 November 1979
- President: Choi Kyu-hah
- Preceded by: Choi Kyu-hah
- Succeeded by: Choi Kyu-hah

7th Deputy Prime Minister of South Korea
- In office 22 December 1978 – 13 December 1979
- President: Park Chung Hee
- Prime Minister: Choi Kyu-hah; Himself
- Preceded by: Nam Duck-woo
- Succeeded by: Han-bin Lee

Personal details
- Born: 29 October 1920 Waegwan, Keishōhoku Province, Korea, Empire of Japan
- Died: 26 April 2007 (aged 86) Jongno, Seoul, South Korea
- Education: Keijō Imperial University

Korean name
- Hangul: 신현확
- Hanja: 申鉉碻
- RR: Sin Hyeonhwak
- MR: Sin Hyŏnhwak

Shin Hyun-hwak (Korean: 신현확; Hanja: 申鉉碻; 29 October 1920 – 26 April 2007) was a South Korean politician who served as the prime minister of South Korea from 1979 to 1980. He was a member of the Democratic Republican Party.

== Early life and career ==
Shin was born in Chilgok County, North Gyeongsang Province on 29 October 1920. He studied at Daegu High School and graduated in law from Gyeongseong Imperial University in 1943, entering a career as a public official under Japanese rule. Following the establishment of the First Republic of Korea, Shin entered the Ministry of Commerce and Industry in 1951. He was elected part of the legislature of South Korea in 1973, in the Democratic Republican Party.

== Government ==
Shin was the South Korean Minister of Health and Social Affairs between 1975 and 1978, becoming Deputy Prime Minister of South Korea in 1978. While Deputy Prime Minister, he was also minister for the economic planning board. Following the assassination of Park Chung Hee, Prime Minister Choi Kyu-hah became acting President of South Korea. On 13 December 1979, Shin was appointed as Prime Minister of South Korea, as part of the Coup d'état of December Twelfth. Following the coup, Choi Kyu-hah repealed a decree banning criticism of the constitution, as well as releasing dissidents from prison. Following the Coup d'état of May Seventeenth, Shin was deposed on 21 May 1980, in the events that led to the dissolution of the Fourth Republic of Korea and creation of the Fifth Republic of Korea.

== Later life ==
Shin remained on the National Advisory Council from 1981 to 1988. In 1986, he gained a position at Samsung C&T Corporation, becoming chairman in 1987. He died on 26 April 2007, at Seoul National University Hospital, after having been in the hospital since February 2006 due to a backbone fracture.
