= 1980 South Korean presidential election =

- 27 August 1980

2,540 members of the National Conference for Unification 1,271 votes needed to win
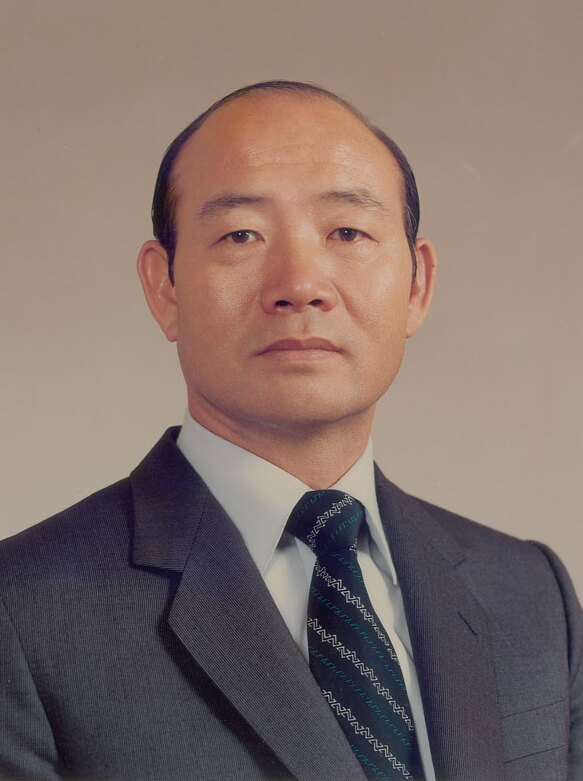
Nominee	Chun Doo-hwan
Party	Independent
Electoral vote	2,524
- Votes of the National Conference for Unification Chun Doo-hwan: 2524 Invalid/blank: 1 Did not vote: 15
President before election
Park Choong-hoon (acting)
Independent
Elected President
Chun Doo-hwan
Independent

Indirect presidential elections were held in South Korea on 27 August 1980 to fill the vacancy caused by President Choi Kyu-hah's resignation.

Under the 1972 Yushin Constitution, the president was elected by the National Conference for Unification, whose 2,540 members had been elected for a six-year term of office in December 1978. General Chun Doo-hwan was the only candidate, and was elected unopposed.

Choi was to serve for the remainder of the 1978–1984 term of longtime president Park Chung-hee, who had died in 1979 and been replaced by him. However, Chun subsequently decided to stage a coup and end the Fourth Republic and draft a new constitution, which was promulgated in October 1980 after being approved in a referendum. The first presidential election under the new constitution was held in February 1981, and Chun was elected by an overwhelming majority under controversial circumstances.

== Background ==
After the assassination of the military dictator President Park Chung-hee in October 1979, Prime Minister Choi Kyu-hah was elected president in the December 1979 elections. However, General Chun Doo-hwan staged the Coup d'état of December Twelfth and effectively took control of the government, making President Choi a figurehead. However, on 16 August 1980, following the Coup d'état of May Seventeenth, Chun removed Choi from office so he could become president himself.

== Results ==
In order to be elected, a candidate had to receive the vote of over 50% of the incumbent members of the National Conference for Unification. With 2,540 delegates present, Chun had to receive at least 1,271 votes to be elected. He received 2,524 votes, 99.37% of the total possible.

Candidate	Party	Votes	%
Chun Doo-hwan	Independent	2,524	100.00
Total		2,524	100.00
Valid votes		2,524	99.96
Invalid/blank votes		1	0.04
Total votes		2,525	100.00
Registered voters/turnout		2,540	99.41

=== Electors by province and city ===
Province/City	Electors	Vacant	Total
Seoul	388	3	391
Busan	145	0	145
Gyeonggi	315	4	319
Gangwon	148	3	151
North Chungcheong	129	2	131
South Chungcheong	229	6	235
North Jeolla	202	1	203
South Jeolla	308	4	312
North Gyeongsang	367	12	379
South Gyeongsang	282	8	290
Jeju	27	0	27
Total	2,540	43	2,583
