= Samchung re-education camp =

1980–1981 South Korean concentration camp

- Indoctrination camps, labor camps
- Coordinates: 38°06′N 127°05′E
- Location: Yeoncheon, Gyeonggi Province, South Korea
- Operated by: Government of South Korea
- Operational: 1980–1981
- Number of inmates: 60,000–100,000+ (peak)
- Killed: at least 339

- Samchung re-education camp
- Hangul: 삼청교육대
- Hanja: 三清教育隊
- RR: Samcheong gyoyukdae
- MR: Samch'ŏng kyoyuktae

The Samchung re-education camp was a South Korean concentration camp set up during the early 1980s under the rule of military dictator Chun Doo-hwan. More than 60,000 people—with estimates up to almost 100,000 people, many of them innocent civilians—were arrested without warrants and faced violent treatment in such camps. The camp was located in Yeoncheon, Gyeonggi Province.

== History ==
In August 1980, under the South Korean military junta, Samchung served as a prison camp for critics of the new military regime and people considered to be a "social ill". This included participants of the notable Gwangju Uprising.

Within a span of six months, more than 40,000 people, many of whom had clean criminal records, were forced into hard labor or faced physical violence by the military, with some of them dying due to ill-treatment.

There were four categories in the camp, A, B, C and D. Each letter corresponded to the severity of treatment an interned person would receive in the camp, with A being the most severe and D the least.

== See also ==
- Human rights in South Korea
- Slavery on salt farms in Sinan County
