= 1979 South Korean presidential election =

- 6 December 1979

2,560 members of the National Conference for Unification 1,281 votes needed to win
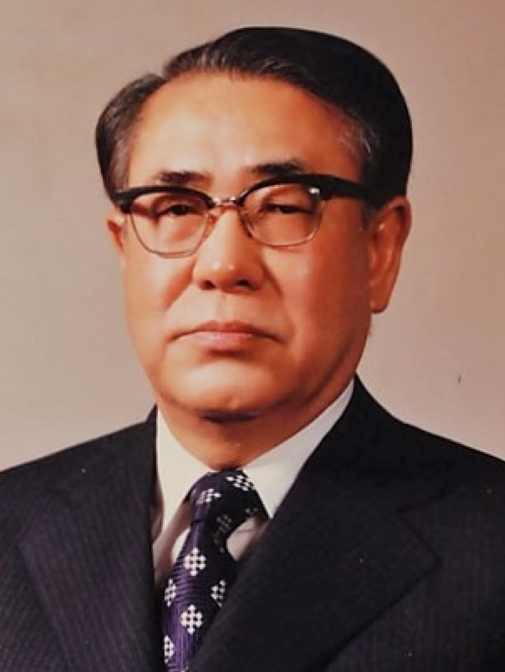
Nominee	Choi Kyu-hah
Party	Independent
Electoral vote	2,465
Percentage	100%
- Votes of the National Conference for Unification Choi Kyu-hah: 2465 Invalid/Blank: 84 Did not vote: 11
President before election
Choi Kyu-hah (Acting)
Independent
Elected President
Choi Kyu-hah
Independent

Presidential elections were held in South Korea on 6 December 1979 following the assassination of Park Chung Hee on 26 October. The members of the National Conference for Unification, who among other things, were responsible for election of president, chose Prime Minister Choi Kyu-hah as the President of the Republic of Korea unopposed; Choi had been acting President since Park's death.

President Choi was supposed to serve for the remainder of late President Park's term, which would have ended in 1984. However, a coup d'état took place six days after the elections, with Chun Doo-hwan seizing power. He allowed Choi to remain in power for eight months, before being elected president in August 1980.

== Results ==
In order to be elected, a candidate had to receive the vote of over 50% of the incumbent members of the National Conference for Unification. With 2,560 delegates present, Choi had to receive at least 1,281 votes to be elected. He received 2,465 votes, 96% of the total possible.

Candidate	Party	Votes	%
Choi Kyu-hah	Independent	2,465	100.00
Total		2,465	100.00
Valid votes		2,465	96.70
Invalid/blank votes		84	3.30
Total votes		2,549	100.00
Registered voters/turnout		2,560	99.57

=== Electors by province and city ===
Province/City	Turnout	%	Electors	Vacant	Total
Seoul	388	99.49	390	1	391
Busan	144	99.31	145	0	145
Gyeonggi	318	100	318	1	319
Gangwon	148	98.67	150	1	151
North Chungcheong	130	100	130	1	131
South Chungcheong	232	100	232	3	235
North Jeolla	200	99.01	202	1	203
South Jeolla	309	99.36	311	1	312
North Gyeongsang	369	99.46	371	8	379
South Gyeongsang	284	100	284	6	290
Jeju	27	100	27	0	27
Total	2,549	99.57	2,560	23	2,583
