= Fifth Republic of Korea =

Government of South Korea from 1981 to 1988

Republic of Korea 대한민국 大韓民國
- 1981–1988
- Flag Coat of arms (1981–1984)
- Motto: 정의사회구현 正義社會具現 Jeongeuisahoeguhyeon ("Implement of Just Society")
- Anthem: 애국가 "Aegukga"
- National seal "국새"

- Capital: Seoul
- Common languages: Korean
- Demonym: South Koreans • Koreans
- Government: Unitary semi-presidential republic under an authoritarian military dictatorship
- President
  - 1981–1988: Chun Doo-hwan
- Prime Minister
  - 1981–1982: Nam Duck-woo
  - 1982: Yoo Chang-soon
  - 1982–1983: Kim Sang-hyup
  - 1983–1985: Chin Iee-chong
  - 1984–1985: Shin Byung-hyun (acting)
  - 1985–1987: Lho Shin-yong
  - 1987: Lee Han-key (acting)
  - 1987–1988: Kim Chung-yul
- Legislature: National Assembly
- Historical era: Cold War
  - Established: 25 February 1981
  - 1981 South Korean presidential election: 25 February 1981
  - New constitution: 3 March 1981
  - 1981 South Korean legislative election: 25 March 1981
  - 1985 South Korean legislative election: 12 February 1985
  - June Democratic Struggle: January–July 1987
  - 1987 South Korean presidential election and new constitution: 16 December 1987 and 19 December 1987
  - Sixth Republic established: 25 February 1988
- Currency: South Korean won
Preceded by	Succeeded by
Fourth Republic of Korea	Sixth Republic of Korea

The Fifth Republic of Korea (Korean: 제5공화국; RR: Je 5 Gonghwaguk; lit. 'Fifth Republic') was the government of South Korea from February 1981 to February 1988.

The Fifth Republic was established in February 1981 by Chun Doo-hwan, a military colleague of long-time president and dictator Park Chung Hee, after the political instability and military rule in the fourth republic since the assassination of Park in October 1979. The Fifth Republic was ruled by Chun and the Democratic Justice Party as a de facto dictatorship and one-party state.

The regime faced growing opposition from the democratization movement of the Gwangju Uprising, and the June Democracy Movement of 1987 resulted in the election of Roh Tae-woo in the December 1987 presidential election. A new constitution was adopted two months prior to the election, laying the foundations for the relatively stable democratic system of the current Republic of Korea. On 25 February 1988, the ninth revision of the South Korean constitution formally came into effect, establishing the Sixth Republic of Korea.

== History ==
=== Background ===
Park Chung Hee had served as the leader of South Korea since July 1961, during which he was a de facto military dictator and maintained his near-absolute power through legal and illegal channels. Park originally came to power as Chairman of the Supreme Council of National Reconstruction two months after the May 16 coup (which he had led) overthrew the Second Republic of Korea. The Supreme Council established a provisional military junta government that prioritized the economic development of South Korea, but faced strong pressure from the United States to restore civilian rule. In 1963, Park abdicated from his military position to run as a civilian in the October 1963 presidential election, defeating the incumbent President Yun Posun and inaugurating the Third Republic of Korea two months later in December. The Third Republic was presented as a return to civilian government under the National Assembly, but in reality was a continuation of Park's military dictatorship and the government was predominantly members of the Supreme Council. Park won re-election in the 1967 presidential election, and the National Assembly passed a constitutional amendment that allowed him to serve a third term, which he won in the 1971 presidential election against Kim Dae-jung. In December 1971, Park declared a state of emergency. On 10 October 1972, Park launched a self-coup known as the October Restoration, dissolving the National Assembly, suspending the constitution, and declaring martial law across the country. Park commissioned work on a brand new constitution, known as the Yushin Constitution, which essentially formalized his long-held dictatorial powers and guaranteed him as president for life. On 21 November 1972, the Yushin Constitution was approved in the 1972 South Korean constitutional referendum with 92.3% of the vote and came into force, dissolving the Third Republic and establishing the Fourth Republic of Korea.

=== Establishment ===
Park's popularity in South Korea declined during the 1970s, as the economic growth of the 1960s began to slow and the public became more critical of his authoritarianism. On 26 October 1979, Park was assassinated at a safehouse by Kim Jae-gyu, the director of the Korean Central Intelligence Agency (KCIA), causing political turmoil in South Korea. Park's successor, Choi Kyu-hah, was an ineffective president whose authority was largely ignored by the political elite. In December, Major General Chun Doo-hwan, the Chairman of the Defense Security Command and a former military colleague of Park, overthrew Choi's government in the Coup d'état of December Twelfth, and over the next few months gained control over most government apparatuses. In May 1980, Chun launched the Coup d'état of May Seventeenth establishing a military dictatorship under National Council for Reunification and declared martial law. Chun violently suppressed the subsequent Gwangju Uprising democracy movement against his rule in Gwangju, during which 200-600 people may have died. In August, Choi resigned and Chun was elected President in the 1980 presidential election by the National Council, running unopposed and winning 99.37% of the vote. In October, Chun abolished all political parties and established his own, the Democratic Justice Party, which was effectively a re-branding of Park's Democratic Republican Party that ruled South Korea since 1963. Soon afterwards, a new constitution was enacted that, while far less authoritarian than Park's Yusin Constitution, was still clearly patterned after that document, including indirect presidential elections and vague "emergency powers" which could be invoked to suspend civil liberties.

The Fifth Republic of Korea was formally inaugurated on 3 March 1981, when Chun was inaugurated as President after being re-elected in the February 1981 presidential election.

=== Democratization ===
Although Chun gradually dismantled the highly centralized government structures set up by Park, his presidency was plagued by public outrage over his reaction to the Gwangju Uprising in 1980. The killings had consolidated momentum of nationwide support for democracy, and many people protested for faster democratization. Chun reorganized the government system and created numerous new ministries, but South Korea remained a de facto one-party state under the Democratic Justice Party, and most elections during this era were not considered legitimate. Nevertheless, Chun had far less power than Park, and with few exceptions his rule was somewhat milder.

In the mid-1980s, Chun began to release political prisoners arrested during his rise to power. In 1985, the New Korea and Democratic Party (NKDP) was founded as the successor of the New Democratic Party, including notable opposition leaders Kim Dae-jung and Kim Young-sam, and campaigned on a focus on greater democratic rights. The NKDP became the opposition in the National Assembly after strong success in the 1985 South Korean legislative election, with only 6% fewer votes than Chun's Democratic Justice Party. Reportedly, the NKDP's electoral success shocked and infuriated Chun. However, in 1986 the NKDP experienced internal ideological conflicts over the severity of opposition to Chun, and in 1987 Kim Young-sam's faction split to form the Reunification Democratic Party.

=== Dissolution ===
The 1980 constitution limited the president to a single seven-year term, with no possibility of reelection even if it was nonsuccessive. It also stipulated that any amendments to remove presidential term limits would not apply to the incumbent, effectively foreclosing any attempts by Chun to run again in 1987. Despite this, Chun resisted calls to open up the regime.

In January 1987, the death of Park Jong-chul caused a flare in the democratization movement and sparked widespread protests. Park, a student at Seoul National University and democracy movement activist, died from causes related to police torture after being arrested at a protest. In June 1987, the death of Lee Han-yeol, a protester killed by a police tear gas grenade at one of the demonstrations following Bak's death, caused unrelenting pressure on Chun. The protesters demanded elections to be held, as well as instituting other democratic reforms, including direct presidential elections. On June 10, Chun announced his choice of Roh Tae-woo as the DJP's candidate for president. He added that the next election would be indirect, a decision which was opposed by the protesters. However, unwilling to resort to violence before the 1988 Olympic Games and believing Roh could win legitimate elections due to divisions within the opposition, Chun and Roh acceded to the key demands of direct presidential elections and restoration of civil liberties. On 16 December 1987, Roh won the 1987 presidential election with 36.6% of the vote, the first honest national elections in South Korea in two decades. Three days later on 19 December, a new highly-democratic and liberal constitution came into effect, Chun finished out his term and handed the presidency to Roh on 25 February 1988. With the handed office, also the Fifth Republic was dissolved and the current Sixth Republic of Korea was established.

== Economy ==
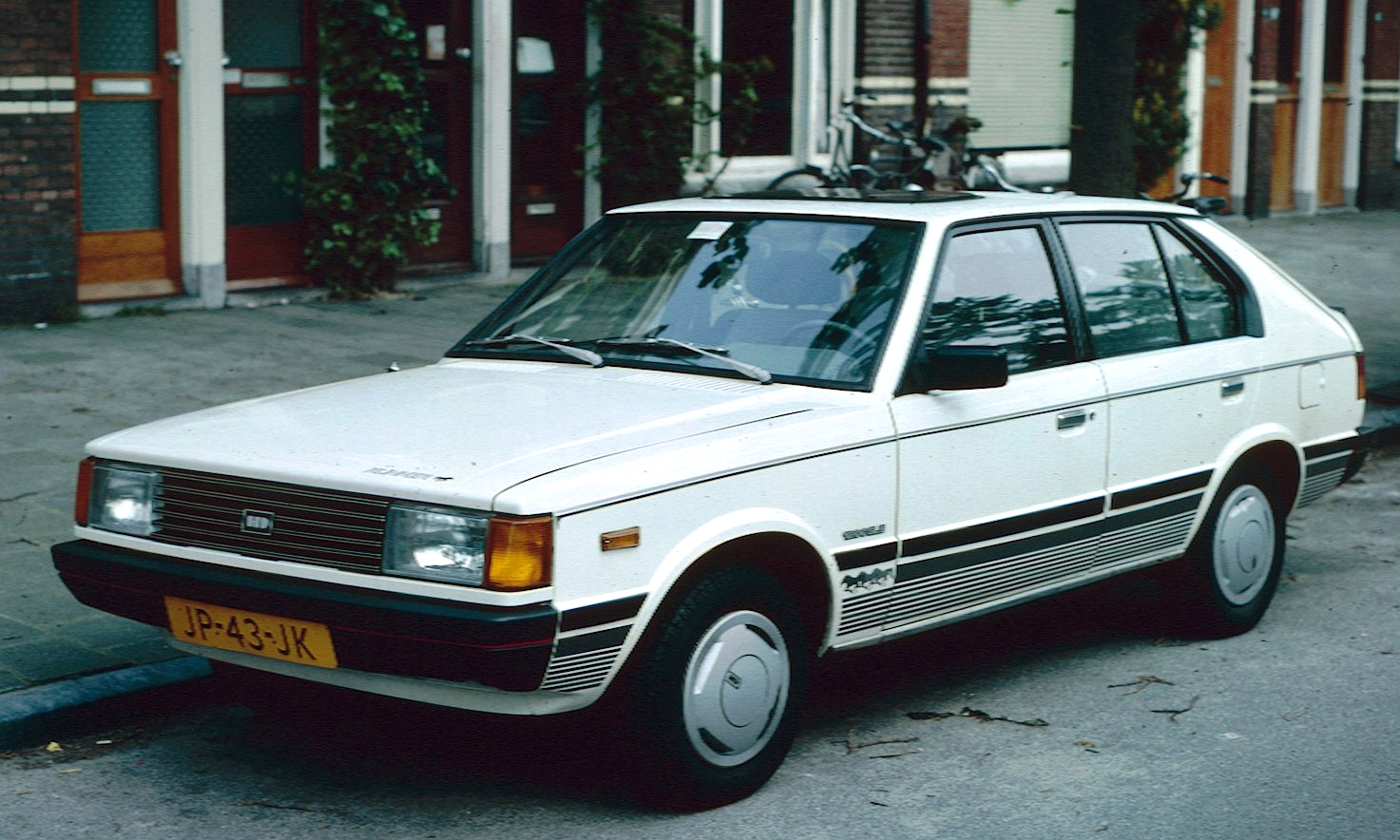
The Hyundai Pony, South Korea's first mass-produced car, began to be exported during the Fifth Republic.

The Fifth Republic experienced economic difficulties during the first half of the 1980s, where foreign debts became a major issue in the aftermath of rapid economic development in the 1960s and 1970s. Many problems surfaced such as the Lee–Chang scandal, the first financial scandal of Chun's presidency, and the dismantling of the International Group, a major Korean conglomerate. Falling oil prices, falling US dollar value, and falling interest rates also affected the country's economy.

By the mid-1980s, the South Korean economy improved, with high-tech industries such as the manufacture of electronics and semiconductors becoming prosperous. In 1986, Hyundai Motors began exporting the Pony and Excel models to the United States, the first signal that South Korea was competing with developed countries in the automobile industry. Thanks to exports, the gross national product (GNP) grew rapidly and the annual average growth rate remained around 10%. In 1987, GNP per capita exceeded $3,000. The start of color television broadcasting in 1980 was also a sign of economic growth.

The South Korean economy continued to be dominated by family-owned conglomerates known as chaebols and their influence grew during the Fifth Republic. The share of the 10 largest conglomerates in the gross national product increased from 33% in 1979 to 54% in 1989, while the number of affiliated companies in the 30 largest conglomerates increased from 126 in 1970 to 429 in 1979 and 513 in 1989.

The liberalization of imports saw the influx of agricultural and livestock products expanded. However, the government's policies provided a favorable environment for large companies, while the rural economy was seriously damaged by the importation of cheap foreign agricultural products. The self-sufficiency rate of grains fell from 86% in 1970 to 48.4% in 1985. Therefore, foreign agricultural and livestock products occupied a large portion of food consumed by South Korean people. While urban areas grew in wealth and size, in contrast the rural population rapidly declined, and many peasants from the countryside migrated to the cities. Rural migrants often lived in poverty at the very bottom of urban society, engaging in industrial or services work, and sometimes illegal activity.

== International relations ==
The Fifth Republic openly maintained close relations with the United States and Japan under the banner of anti-communism, promoting a Korea-US-Japan Triangular Alliance. The Chun government's strong pro-American stance caused a reaction of Anti-Americanism in the democratization movement, which had been treated with suspicion by the United States along with other student movements. While military relations with Japan were strong, the Fifth Republic witnessed a rise in Anti-Japanese sentiment in South Korea due to various cultural and political disputes, mostly related to the history of Japanese rule in Korea. Examples include the Japanese history textbook controversies and problems with the Japanese immigration system for Koreans in Japan.

South Korea's relations with North Korea thawed during the beginning of the Fifth Republic, and proposed reunification plans were announced, but only held favorable conditions for their respective countries and was mostly used for propaganda. North Korean relations soured in 1983 after the Rangoon bombing, an attempted assassination of President Chun during a state visit in Rangoon, Burma. Three North Korean agents detonated a bomb at the Martyrs' Mausoleum intending to kill Chun during a wreath laying ceremony to commemorate Aung San. The blast killed 21 people, including four senior South Korean politicians: foreign minister Lee Bum Suk, minister of power resource Suh Sang-chul, economic planning minister and deputy prime minister Suh Suk-Joon, and minister for commerce and industry Kim Dong-Whie. In September 1984, relations improved when North Korea sent large quantities of aid to South Korea during major flooding. The aid was accepted by Chun despite the North Korean attempt on his life less than a year earlier. In 1985, Chun proposed an inter-Korean summit that was eventually held in September in Seoul. The summit was considered a success in inter-Korean relations, but the bombing of Korean Air Flight 858 on 29 November 1987 by North Korean agents damaged relations again.

The Fifth Republic continued South Korea's openly pro-Western stance and promoted stronger diplomatic ties with NATO countries in Europe, hoping to form greater economic ties to the European Community. The Fifth Republic also began to establish diplomatic relations with various African and Asian countries, including the United Arab Emirates, Lebanon, Pakistan, Brunei, and Bhutan.

== See also ==
- History of Korea
- History of South Korea
- Korean Air Lines Flight 007
