= Park Choong-hoon =

South Korean politician (1919–2001)

- 박충훈
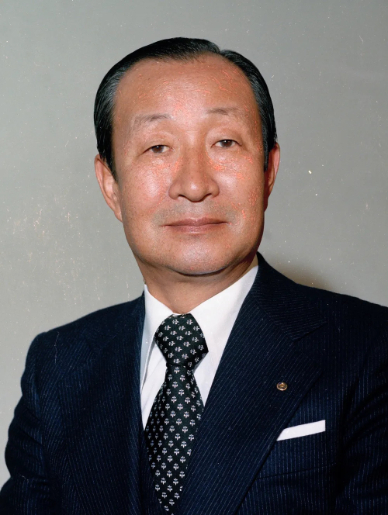
- Park in 1980

Acting President of South Korea
- In office 16 August 1980 – 27 August 1980
- Prime Minister: Himself (acting)
- Preceded by: Choi Kyu-hah
- Succeeded by: Chun Doo-hwan

Acting Prime Minister of South Korea
- In office 22 May 1980 – 1 September 1980
- President: Choi Kyu-hah; Himself (acting)
- Preceded by: Shin Hyun-hwak
- Succeeded by: Nam Duck-woo

3rd Deputy Prime Minister and Minister of the Economic Planning Board
- In office 3 October 1967 – 3 June 1969
- President: Park Chung Hee
- Prime Minister: Chung Il-kwon
- Preceded by: Chang Ki-young
- Succeeded by: Kim Hak-ryul

Personal details
- Born: 19 January 1919 Jeju City, Korea, Empire of Japan
- Died: 16 March 2001 (aged 82) Seoul, South Korea
- Education: Doshisha Higher Commercial School; Korea National Defense University

Korean name
- Hangul: 박충훈
- Hanja: 朴忠勳
- RR: Bak Chunghun
- MR: Pak Ch'unghun

Park Choong-hoon (Korean: 박충훈; 19 January 1919 – 16 March 2001) was a South Korean politician who served as the acting prime minister and acting president of South Korea in 1980.

== Biography ==
Park was born in Jeju-gun, Jeju City and graduated from Gyeongseong No. 1 High School, Doshisha Higher Commercial School, and Korea National Defense University. In 1949, he was commissioned as an officer in the Republic of Korea Air Force, and in 1961 he was promoted to the rank of Major General of the Republic of Korea Air Force. He served as director of Trade Bureau of the Ministry of Commerce and Industry, vice minister of Commerce and Industry, minister of Commerce and Industry, and deputy prime minister and minister of the Economic Planning Board in 1967.

After that, he held positions such as the chairman of the Korea International Trade Association, the chairman of Daewoo, and the chairman of the Korea Institute of Science and Technology. In May 1980, when Prime Minister Shin Hyun-hwak resigned due to the outbreak of the Gwangju Uprising, he was appointed as the acting prime minister. Upon President Choi Kyu-hah's resignation, Park became the acting president of South Korea. He served in the role from 16 August 1980, until Chun Doo-hwan was elected by the National Conference for Unification on 27 August 1980.
