= Nam Duck-woo =

South Korean politician (1924–2013)

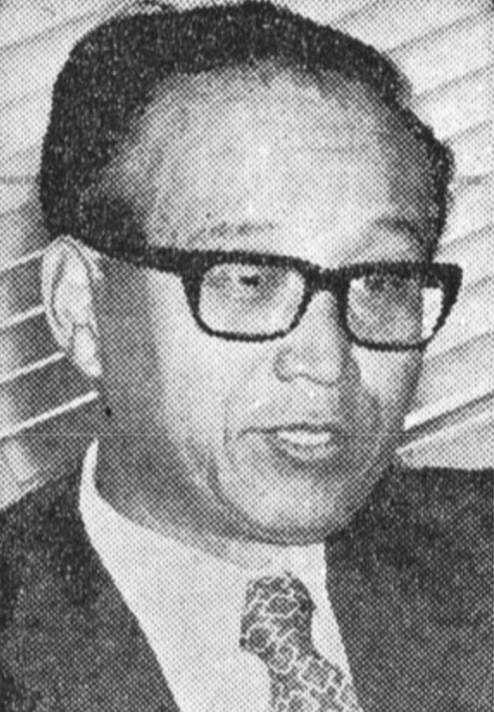

14th Prime Minister of South Korea
- In office 2 September 1980 – 21 September 1980 (acting)
- President: Chun Doo-hwan
- Deputy: Shin Byung-hyun
- Preceded by: Shin Hyun-hwak; Park Choong-hoon (acting)
- Succeeded by: Himself
- In office 22 September 1980 – 3 January 1982
- President: Chun Doo-hwan
- Preceded by: Himself
- Succeeded by: Yoo Chang-soon

6th Deputy Prime Minister of South Korea
- In office 18 September 1974 – 22 December 1978
- President: Park Chung Hee
- Prime Minister: Kim Jong-pil; Choi Kyu-hah
- Preceded by: Tae Wan-seon
- Succeeded by: Shin Hyun-hwak

Personal details
- Born: 22 April 1924 Kōshū, Keiki-dō, Korea, Empire of Japan
- Died: 18 May 2013 (aged 89) Seoul, South Korea
- Education: Kookmin University (BA); Seoul National University (MA); Oklahoma State University (PhD)
- Occupation: Politician, Economist

Korean name
- Hangul: 남덕우
- Hanja: 南悳祐
- RR: Nam Deoku
- MR: Nam Tŏgu

Nam Duck-woo (Korean: 남덕우; 22 April 1924 – 18 May 2013) was the prime minister of South Korea from 1980 to 1982.

== Biography ==
Nam received his PhD in economics from Oklahoma State University. He was faculty in the School of Economics and Sogang University. He then served as finance minister from 1969 to 1974 under the presidency of Park Chung Hee. He was appointed as Deputy Prime Minister of South Korea in 1974 and served in this position till 1978. Under President Chun Doo-hwan, Nam was the prime minister from 1980 to 1982.

Nam served as the International Chair of the Pacific Economic Cooperation Council (PECC) from 1983 to 1985.

== Death ==
On 18 May 2013, Duck-woo died of testicular cancer at the age of 89.

== See also ==
- List of Prime Ministers of South Korea
- List of Deputy Prime Ministers of South Korea

Political offices
Preceded by Park Choong-hoon (acting)	Acting Prime Minister of South Korea; September 2, 1980 – September 21, 1980	Succeeded by Himself
Preceded by Himself	14th Prime Minister of South Korea; September 22, 1980 – January 3, 1982	Succeeded by Yoo Chang-soon
Preceded by Tae Wan-seon	6th Deputy Prime Minister of South Korea; 18 September 1974 – 22 December 1978	Succeeded by Shin Hyun-hwak
