= Chun Doo-hwan =

Leader of South Korea from 1979 to 1988

- 전두환
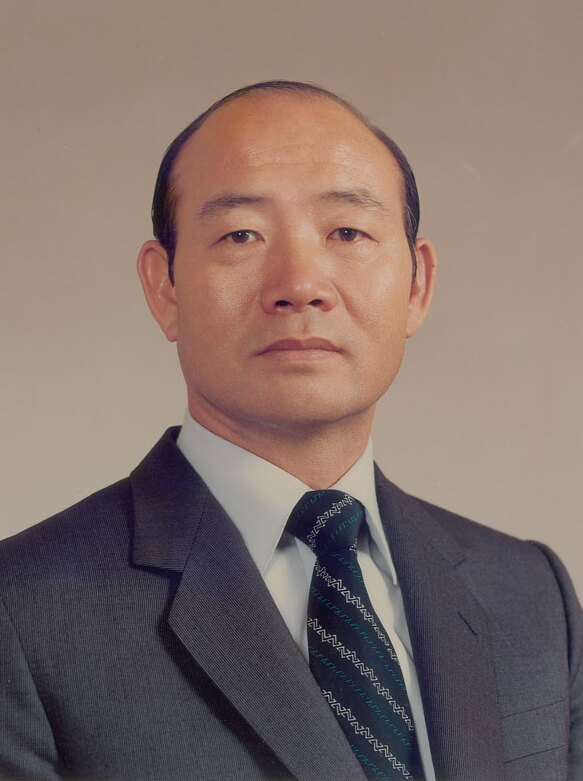
- Official portrait, 1980

5th President of South Korea
- In office 27 August 1980 – 24 February 1988 (Note: Although his position became officially known as "President" from 1 September 1980 after an internal election which lacked universal suffrage, Chun rule was a continuance which had already begun since the military Coup d'état of December Twelfth in 1979.)
- Prime Minister: Nam Duck-woo; Yoo Chang-soon; Kim Sang-hyup; Chin Iee-chong; Shin Byung-hyun (acting); Lho Shin-yong; Lee Han-key (acting); Kim Chung-yul
- Preceded by: Choi Kyu-hah; Park Choong-hoon (acting)
- Succeeded by: Roh Tae-woo

President of the Democratic Justice Party
- In office 15 January 1981 – 10 July 1987
- Preceded by: Position established
- Succeeded by: Roh Tae-woo

Leader of South Korea
- De facto 12 December 1979 – 1 September 1980
- President: Choi Kyu-Hah; Park Choong-hoon (acting)
- Prime Minister: Shin Hyun-hwak; Park Choong-hoon (acting)
- Preceded by: Choi Kyu-hah (as President)
- Succeeded by: Himself (as President)

Personal details
- Born: 18 January 1931 Gosen, Keishōnan Province, Korea, Empire of Japan
- Died: 23 November 2021 (aged 90) Seoul, South Korea
- Party: Democratic Justice
- Other political affiliations: Hanahoe
- Spouse: Lee Soon-ja (m. 1959)
- Children: 4
- Education: Korea Military Academy (BS)

Military service
- Allegiance: South Korea
- Branch/service: Republic of Korea Army
- Years of service: 1951–1980
- Rank: General
- Commands: Defense Security Command, KCIA
- Battles/wars: Korean War; Vietnam War

Korean name
- Hangul: 전두환
- Hanja: 全斗煥
- RR: Jeon Duhwan
- MR: Chŏn Tuhwan
- IPA: [tɕʌn duβwan]

Art name
- Hangul: 일해
- Hanja: 日海
- RR: Ilhae
- MR: Irhae

Courtesy name
- Hangul: 용성
- Hanja: 勇星
- RR: Yongseong
- MR: Yongsŏng
- Chun Doo-hwan's voice Chun's remarks during a White House departure ceremony Recorded 2 February 1981

Chun Doo-hwan (Korean: 전두환; pronounced [tɕʌn duβwan]; 18 January 1931 – 23 November 2021) was a South Korean army general and politician who served as the fifth president of South Korea from 1980 to 1988. A member of the military, he ruled the country as a military dictator following a successful coup in December 1979. The period encompassing his presidency is known as the Fifth Republic of Korea.

Born in Hapcheon County, Korea, Empire of Japan, Chun graduated from Korea Military Academy in 1955 with a bachelor's degree in science. He usurped power after the 1979 assassination of president Park Chung Hee, who was himself a military dictator who had ruled since 1961. Chun orchestrated the 12 December 1979 military coup, then cemented his military rule in the 17 May 1980 military coup in which he declared martial law and later set up a concentration camp for "purificatory education". He established the Fifth Republic of Korea on 3 March 1981. He governed under a constitution somewhat less authoritarian than Park's Fourth Republic, but still held very broad executive power, and used extreme violence to maintain it. During his tenure, South Korea's economy grew at its highest rate ever, achieving the country's first trade surplus in 1986. After the June Struggle democratization movement of 1987, Chun conceded to allowing the December 1987 presidential election to be free and open. It was won by his close friend and ally Roh Tae-woo, who continued many of Chun's policies during his own rule into the 1990s.

In 1996, Chun was convicted by the Seoul High Court on multiple charges, including treason and insurrection, for orchestrating the 1979 coup d'état and unlawfully declaring martial law to subdue the National Assembly and suppress the Gwangju Uprising. The conviction was upheld by the Supreme Court in April of the following year; however, in December, President Kim Young-sam, on the advice of the incoming President-elect Kim Dae-jung—whom Chun's administration had sentenced to death two decades earlier—pardoned both Chun and Roh, the latter having been sentenced to 17 years. Chun and Roh were fined $203 million and $248 million respectively, amounts that were embezzled through corruption during their regimes, which were mostly never paid.

In his final years, Chun was criticized for his unapologetic stance and the lack of remorse for his actions as a dictator and his wider regime. Chun died on 23 November 2021 at the age of 90 after a relapse of myeloma.

== Early life and education ==
Chun was born on 18 January 1931 in Yulgok-myeon, a poor farming town in Hapcheon County, Korea, Empire of Japan. Chun's family is from the Wansan Jeon clan. Chun was the fourth son out of ten children to Jeon Sang-u (전상우) and Kim Jeong-mun (김정문). Chun's oldest two brothers, Yeol-hwan (열환) and Gyu-gon (규곤), died in an accident when he was an infant. Chun grew up knowing his remaining older brother Gi-hwan (기환) and his younger brother Gyeong-hwan.

Around 1936, Chun's family moved to Daegu, where he began attending Horan Elementary School. Chun's father had run-ins with the kempeitai in the past; in the winter of 1939 he murdered a police captain. Their family immediately fled to Jilin, Manchukuo, where they stayed in hiding for two years before returning. When Chun finally started attending elementary school again, he was two years behind his original classmates.

In 1947, Chun began attending Daegu Vocational Middle School, located nearly 25 km from his home. Chun moved on to Daegu Vocational High School.

In 1950, Chun fought in the Korean War as the part of the Student Volunteer Forces.

== Military career ==
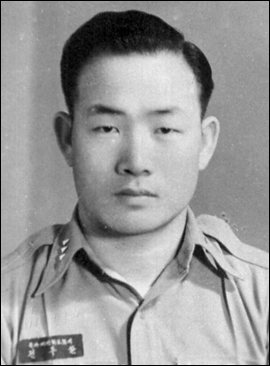
Chun as captain, 1959

After graduating from high school in 1951, Chun gained entry into the Korea Military Academy (KMA). While there, he made several key friends among the students who would later play instrumental roles in helping Chun seize control of the country. He graduated in February 1955 with a Bachelor of Science degree and a commission as a second lieutenant in the 11th class of the KMA. He later trained in the United States, specializing in guerilla tactics and psychological warfare, and married Lee Soon-ja, the daughter of the KMA's commandant at the time of his attendance, in 1959.

Chun, then a captain, led a demonstration at the KMA to show support for the May 16 coup in 1961 led by Park Chung Hee. Chun was subsequently made secretary to the commander of the Supreme Council for National Reconstruction, placing him directly under Park. Chun was quickly promoted to major in 1962, while continuing to make powerful friends and acquaintances. As a major, Chun was the deputy chief of operations for the Special Warfare Command's battle headquarters, and later worked for the Supreme Council for Reconstruction again as the Chief Civil Affairs Officer. In 1963, Chun was given a position in the Korean Central Intelligence Agency (KCIA) as Personnel Director. By 1969, he was senior advisor to the Army Chief of Staff.

In 1970, holding the rank of colonel, Chun became the commander of the 29th Regiment, South Korean 9th Infantry Division, and participated in the Vietnam War. Upon returning to Korea in 1971, he was given command of the 1st Special Forces Brigade (Airborne) and later promoted to brigadier general. In 1976 he worked as the deputy chief of the Presidential Security Service and was promoted to the rank of major general during his time there. In 1978 he became the commanding officer of the 1st Infantry Division. According to The New York Times, President Park was said to have favored him over other military men of his age and to have treated him much like godson.

Finally, in 1979, he was appointed commander of Security Command, his highest position yet.

== Rise to power ==
=== Hanahoe ===
Chun formed Hanahoe as a secret military clique shortly after his promotion to general officer. It was predominantly composed of his fellow graduates from the 11th class of the KMA, as well as other friends and supporters. Membership was predominantly restricted to officers from the Gyeongsang Province with just a token membership reserved for a Cholla Province officer. Hanahoe's existence within a highly regimented and rigid hierarchical organization of the army was only possible because it was under the patronage of then President Park.

=== Assassination of Park Chung Hee ===
On 26 October 1979, Park was assassinated by Kim Jae-kyu, Director of the KCIA, while at a dinner party. Secretly, Kim had invited General Jeong Seung-hwa, Army Chief of Staff, and Kim Jeong-seop, Vice-Deputy Director of the KCIA, to dinner in another room that night as well. Although Jeong Seung-hwa was neither present during nor involved in the shooting of Park, his presence at the scene later proved crucial to his downfall. In the chaos that followed, Kim Jae-kyu was not arrested for many hours, as details of the incident were initially unclear.

After some confusion over the constitutional procedures for presidential succession, Prime Minister Choi Kyu-ha finally ascended to the position of Acting President. Soon after, Jeong named Chun's Security Command to head up the investigation into the assassination. Chun immediately ordered his subordinates to draw up plans for the creation of an all-powerful "Joint Investigation Headquarters".

On 27 October, Chun called for a meeting in his commander's office. Invited were four key individuals now responsible for all intelligence collection nationwide: KCIA Deputy Chief of Foreign Affairs, KCIA Deputy Chief of Domestic Affairs, Attorney General, and Chief of the National Police. Chun had each person searched at the door on his way in, before having them seated and informing them of the President's death. Chun declared the KCIA held full responsibility for Park's assassination, and its organization was therefore under investigation for the crime. Chun stated that the KCIA would no longer be allowed to exercise its own budget:

For the KCIA "to continue exercising full discretion of their budget is unacceptable. Therefore, they are only allowed to execute their duties upon receiving authorization from the Joint Investigation Headquarters."

— Chun Doo-hwan, Security Command and Joint Investigation Headquarters commander, 27 October 1979

Chun subsequently ordered all intelligence reports to now be sent to his office at 8:00 am and 5:00 pm every day, so he could decide what information to give higher command. In one move, Chun had taken control of the entire nation's intelligence organizations. Chun then put the KCIA Deputy Chief of Foreign Affairs in charge of running the day-to-day business of the KCIA.

Major Park Jun-kwang, working under Chun at the time, later commented:

In front of the most powerful organizations under the Park Chung Hee presidency, it surprised me how easily [Chun] gained control over them and how skillfully he took advantage of the circumstances. In an instant he seemed to have grown into a giant.

— Park Jun-kwang, assigned to Security Command and Joint Investigation Headquarters

During the investigation, Chun personally gave money (US$500,000) from Park's slush fund to Park's daughter Park Geun-hye, who was 27 at the time. He was reprimanded for this by Jeong.

On 5 November, a preliminary report was released by Chun, placing full responsibility of Park's assassination on Kim and his associates.

=== 12 December mutiny ===
In the following month Chun, along with Roh Tae-woo, Yu Hak-seong, Heo Sam-su, and others from the Hanahoe, continued taking advantage of the fragile political situation to grow Hanahoe's strength, courting key commanders and subverting the nation's intelligence gathering organizations.

General Jeong, his superior, was a moderate figure in the armed forces and gave hints on multiple occasions that he supported the political liberalization process, as opposed to Chun, who favors keeping the Yushin Constitution intact.

On 12 December 1979, amid a cabinet reshuffle, Chun ordered the arrest of Jeong on charges of conspiring with Kim Jae-kyu to assassinate Park. This order was made without authorization from President Choi. On the night of Jeong's capture, 29th Regiment, 9th Division, along with the 1st and 3rd Airborne Brigades, invaded downtown Seoul to support the 30th and 33rd Security Group loyal to Chun, which resulted in a series of conflicts that broke out in the capital. Jang Tae-wan, commander of the Capital Garrison Command, and Jeong Byeong Ju, commander of the special forces, were also arrested by the rebel troops. Major Kim Oh-rang, aide-de-camp of Jeong Byeong-ju, was killed during the gunfight. By the next morning, the Ministry of Defense and Army HQ were all occupied, and Chun was in firm control of the military. For all intents and purposes, he was now the de facto leader of the country.

In early 1980, Chun was promoted to the rank of lieutenant general, and he took up the position of acting director of the KCIA. On 14 April, Chun was officially installed as director of the KCIA.

=== Coup, martial law and military crackdown in Gwangju ===
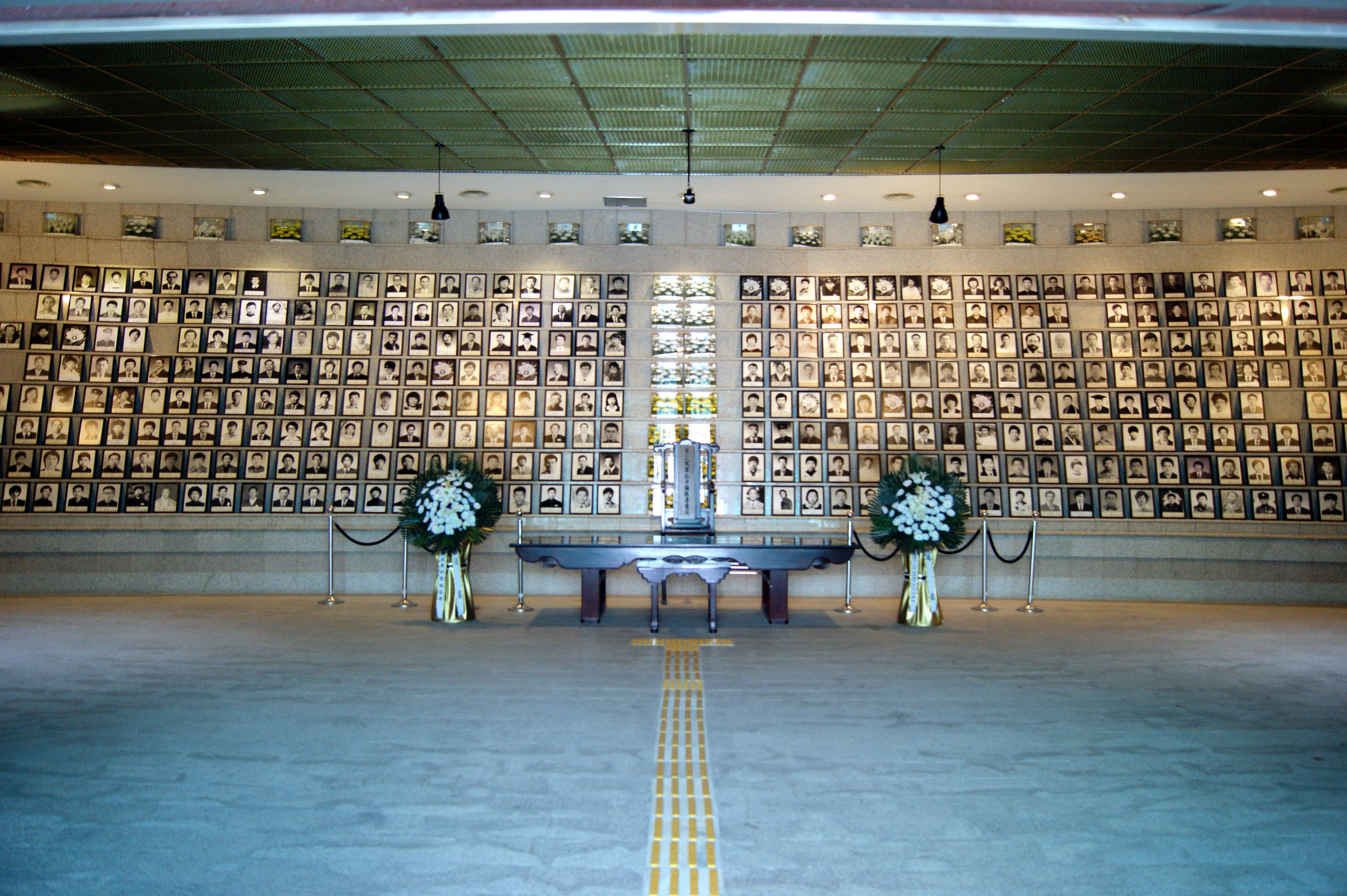
Memorial Hall in the May 18th National Cemetery in Gwangju where victims' bodies were buried

On 17 May 1980, Chun expanded martial law to the entire country, due to stated rumors of North Korean infiltration and presence of South Korean communist sympathizers in the country. The KCIA manipulated these rumors at the command of Chun. General John A. Wickham (commander of the US Armed Forces in Korea) reported that Chun's pessimistic assessment of the domestic situation and his emphasis on the North Korean threat only seemed to be a pretext for a move into the Blue House (the Korean presidential residence).

To enforce martial law, troops were dispatched to various parts of the nation. The expanded martial law closed universities, banned political activities, and further curtailed the press. Political opponents such as the recently freed Kim Dae-jung was again arrested. The event of 17 May meant the beginning of another military dictatorship.

Many civilians were growing unhappy with the military presence in their cities, and on 18 May, the citizens of Gwangju organized protests into what became known as the Gwangju Democratization Movement. Chun ordered it to be immediately suppressed, sending in shock troops armed with heavy weaponry such as armored tanks and helicopters to retake City Hall and ordered the troops to exercise full force. This led to a bloody massacre over the next nine days, ultimately leading to the collapse of the protests and the deaths of at least 200 Gwangju activists. For this, he was called "The Butcher of Gwangju" by many people, especially among the students.

=== Path to the presidency ===
In June 1980, Chun ordered the National Assembly to be dissolved. He subsequently created the Special Committee for National Security Measures (SCNSM), a junta-like organization, and installed himself as head of command. On 17 July, he resigned his position as KCIA Director, and then held only the position of committee member.

On 5 August, with full control of the military he effectively promoted himself to four star General and on 22 August he was discharged from active duty to the Army reserves.

==== Samchung re-education camp ====
Beginning in August 1980, citizens were subjected to organized violence under the name of social cleansing, which aimed at the elimination of social ills, such as violence, smuggling, illegal drugs, and deceptions. They were arrested without proper warrants and given ex parte rankings. Some 42,000 victims were enrolled in the Samchung re-education camp for "purificatory education". More than 60,000 people were arrested in six months between August 1980 and January 1981, including many innocent citizens. They faced violence and hard labour in the re-education camp.

== Dictatorship (1980–1987) ==
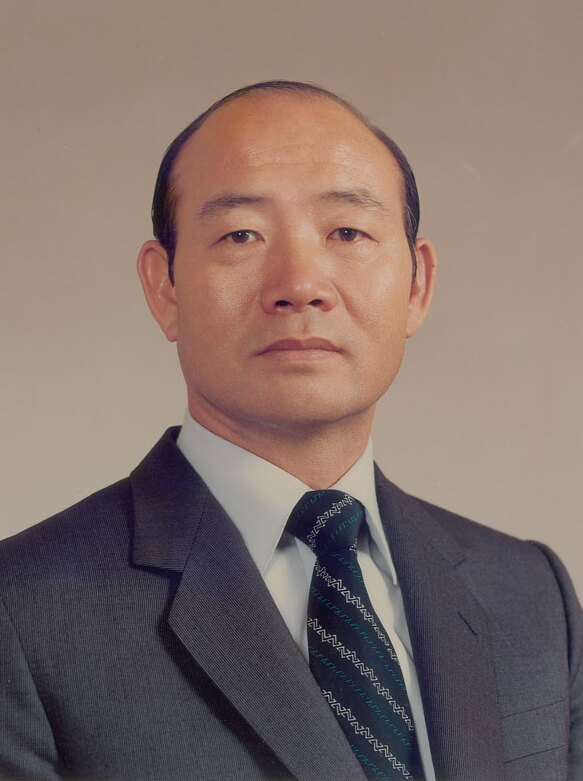
- Official portrait, 1980
- Dictatorship of Chun Doo-hwan; 27 August 1980 – 25 February 1988
- Prime Minister: Nam Duck-woo; Yoo Chang-soon; Kim Sang-hyup; Chin Iee-chong; Lho Shin-yong; Kim Chung-yul
- Cabinet: Full list
- Party: Hanahoe (1980–1981); Democratic Justice (1981–1988)
- Seat: Seoul
- First term August 27, 1980 – February 25, 1981
- Election: 1980
- Constituency: Fourth Republic
- Second term February 25, 1981 – February 25, 1988
- Election: 1981
- Constituency: Fifth Republic

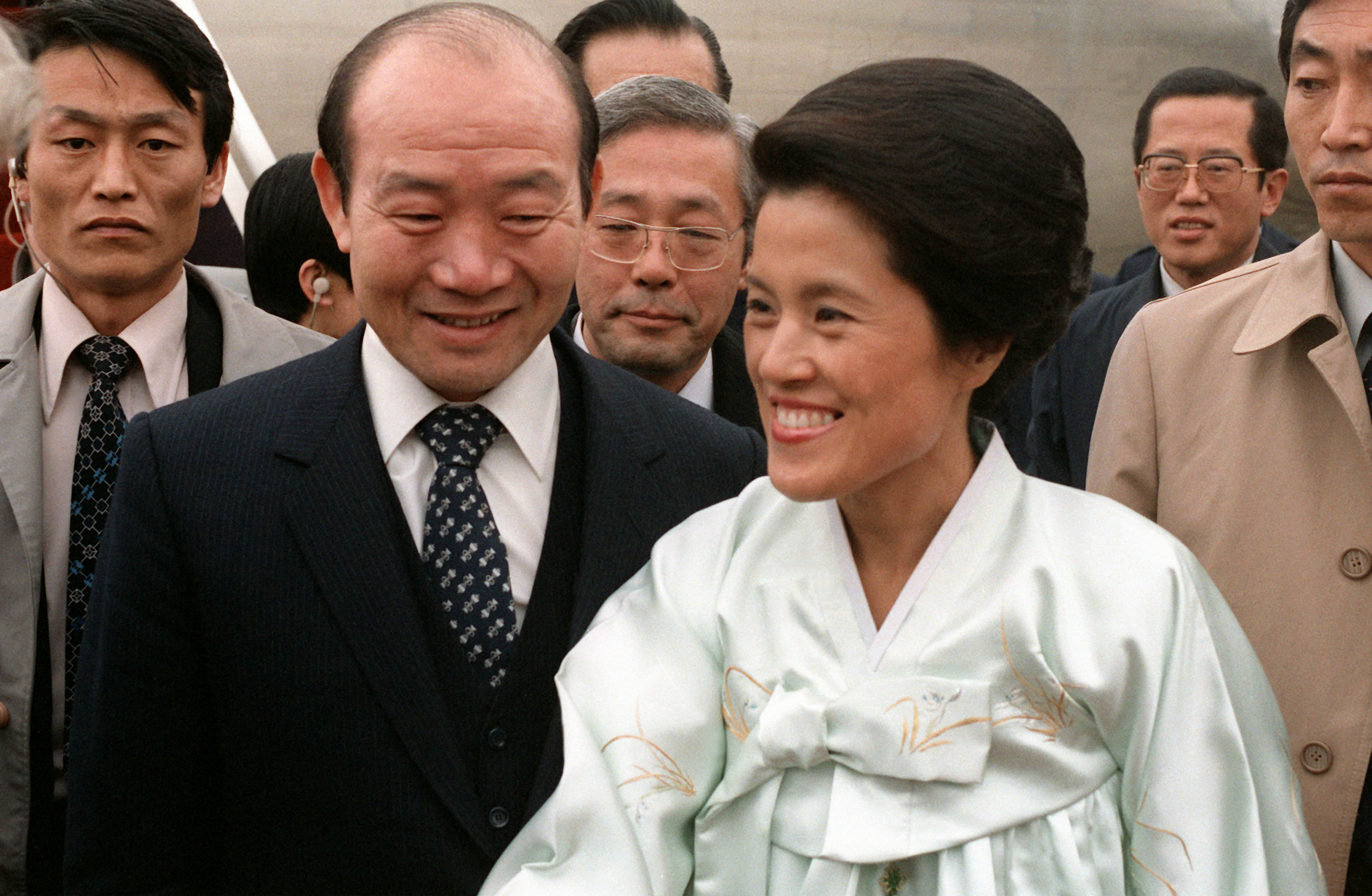
President Chun, and his wife, Lee Soon-ja, prepare to depart after their visit to Washington, D.C. in 1981.

=== Policy ===
In August 1980, Choi, who had long since become little more than a figurehead, announced that he would be resigning the presidency. On 27 August, the National Conference for Unification, the nation's electoral college, gathered in Jangchung Arena for the indirect presidential election. Chun was the sole candidate. Out of 2525 members, 2524 voted for Chun with one vote counted as invalid, thus with a tally of 99.96% in favor (it was widely speculated at that time that one invalid vote was purposely rigged as to differentiate Chun from North Korea's Kim Il Sung, who regularly claimed 100% support in North Korea's elections). He was officially inaugurated into office on 1 September 1980.

On 17 October, he abolished all political parties—including Park's Democratic Republican Party, which had essentially ruled the country as a one-party state since the imposition of the Yushin Constitution. In November, he implemented the Policy for Merger and Abolition of the Press. In January 1981, Chun formed his own party, the Democratic Justice Party; however, for all intents and purposes, it was Park's Democratic Republican Party under a new name. Soon afterward, a new constitution was enacted. It was far less authoritarian than Park's Yushin Constitution; for instance, it enshrined the secrecy of correspondence. It still vested fairly broad powers in the president, albeit less sweeping than those Park had held.

He was then re-elected president by the National Conference that February, taking 90 percent of the delegates' vote against three minor candidates. However, Chun's election was a foregone conclusion after the DJP's decisive victory at elections for the National Conference two weeks earlier. The DJP won a supermajority of 69.5 percent of the seats, three times as many as the independents and nine times as many as the opposition Democratic Korea Party.

==== Economic policy ====
Chun assumed power amid a severe economic downturn. In 1980, South Korea recorded its first economic contraction since 1962, while inflation had risen and the balance-of-payments position had deteriorated. His administration made economic stabilization a priority, combining fiscal and monetary restraint with longer-term structural reforms and greater liberalization of imports and foreign investment.

Chun delegated much of the formulation of economic policy to a group of technocratic economists headed by Kim Jae-ik, who served first in the Economic Planning Board and later as the president's senior secretary for economic affairs. Kim and his team advocated tighter fiscal and monetary policy, structural adjustment, and liberalization of the import regime. According to a 2021 opinion column by JoongAng Ilbo columnist Lee Chul-ho, Chun told Kim, “On the economy, you're the president.” Lee also wrote that Chun instructed economic ministers and working-level officials to confer directly with Kim, reducing bureaucratic obstacles to the implementation of his proposals.

The administration's program included interest-rate reductions in 1981, temporary tax relief for struggling heavy and chemical industries, broader reductions in corporate tax rates, and the privatization of commercial banks. The Monopoly Regulation and Fair Trade Act was enacted on 31 December 1980 and established the Korea Fair Trade Commission, replacing the previous emphasis on direct price controls with a legal framework intended to promote competition. The reforms nevertheless had significant limitations: the commission remained subordinate to the Economic Planning Board, enforcement initially relied largely on warnings, and exemptions weakened restrictions on the chaebol. Bank privatization also failed to eliminate preferential credit or the continuing economic influence of the conglomerates.

South Korea subsequently averaged 9.2 percent annual real economic growth from 1982 through 1987, while consumer-price inflation averaged 4.7 percent between 1980 and 1988. The country recorded its first significant balance-of-payments surplus in 1986 and began reducing its foreign debt. Economic historians have attributed the recovery to both the administration's stabilization measures and improvements in the international economy, rather than to domestic policy alone.

==== Missile memorandum ====
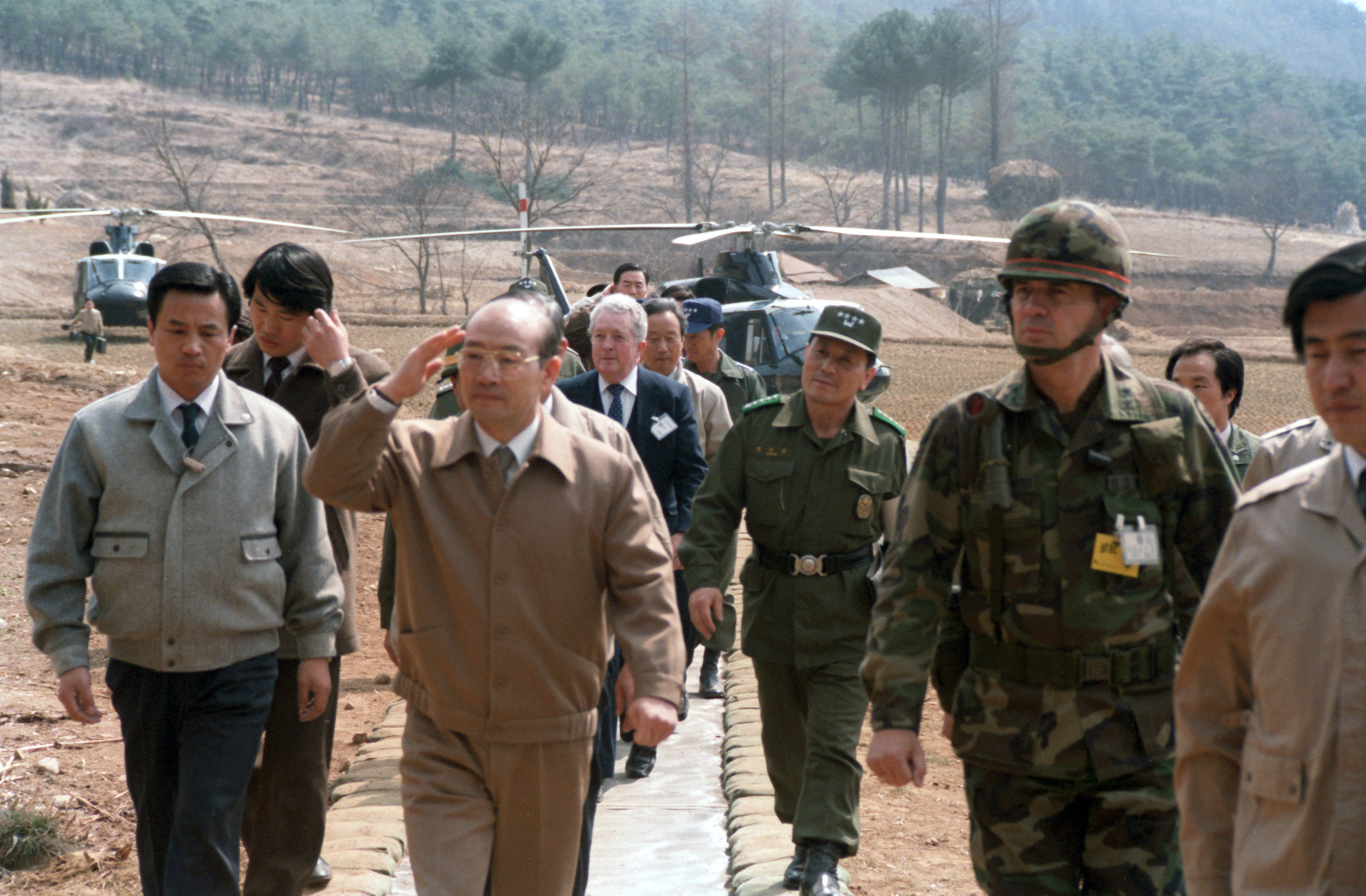
Chun with U.S. Major General Claude M. Kicklighter in March 1985

In 1980, in the face of increased tension with the U.S. over his military takeover, Chun issued a memorandum stating that his country would not develop missiles with a range longer than 180 km or capable of carrying greater than a 453 kg warhead. After receiving this promise, the Reagan administration decided to fully recognize Chun's military government.

==== Removed political influence of Park Chung Hee ====
After his election in 1981, Chun completely rejected the presidency of Park, even going so far as to strike all references to Park's 1961 military coup from the constitution. Chun announced that he would be restoring justice to the government to remove the fraud and corruption of Park's tenure.

==== South Korean nuclear weapons program ====
Chun's government did not have the considerable political influence enjoyed by Park's administration. His government could not ignore American influence, and he ended South Korea's nuclear weapons program. During this time, Chun was worried about the state of South Korean-U.S. relations, which had greatly deteriorated towards the end of Park Chung Hee's long authoritarian presidency. Chun needed to be recognized by the United States to legitimize his government.

==== Political reforms ====
After his inauguration, Chun clamped down on out-of-school tutoring and banned individual teaching or tutoring. In September 1980, Chun repealed "guilt by association" laws. In January 1981, Chun commuted the death sentence of opposition leader, Kim Dae-jung, after aides close to U.S. President Ronald Reagan quietly warned him that executing Kim on shaky charges of subversion would seriously harmed South Korea's relations with the United States. In 1981, Chun enacted "Care and Custody" legislation; Chun believed that criminals who finish their prison time for a repeat offense should not be immediately returned to society. During the winter of 1984, before declaring a moratorium on the Korean economy, Chun visited Japan, where he requested a loan for $6 billion. With the military coup taking power and crushing the democratization movements country-wide, the citizens' political demands were being ignored, and in this way the 3S policy (Sex, Screen, Sports) was passed. Based on right-wing Japanese activist Sejima Ryuzo's proposal, Chun tried to appeal to the citizens in order to ensure the success of the 1988 Seoul Olympics preparations. Chun rapidly enacted various measures to this end, forming professional baseball and soccer leagues, starting the broadcast of color TV throughout the nation as a whole, lessening censorship on sexually suggestive dramas and movies, making school uniforms voluntary, and so forth. In 1981, Chun held a large-scale festival called "Korean Breeze '81 [Kukpung81]", but it was largely ignored by the population.

==== 1983 assassination attempt by North Korea ====
In 1983, Chun was the target of a failed assassination attempt by North Korean agents during a visit to Rangoon, Burma. The North Korean bombing killed 17 of Chun's entourage, including cabinet ministers. Four Burmese government officials were also killed in the attack.

=== Foreign policy ===
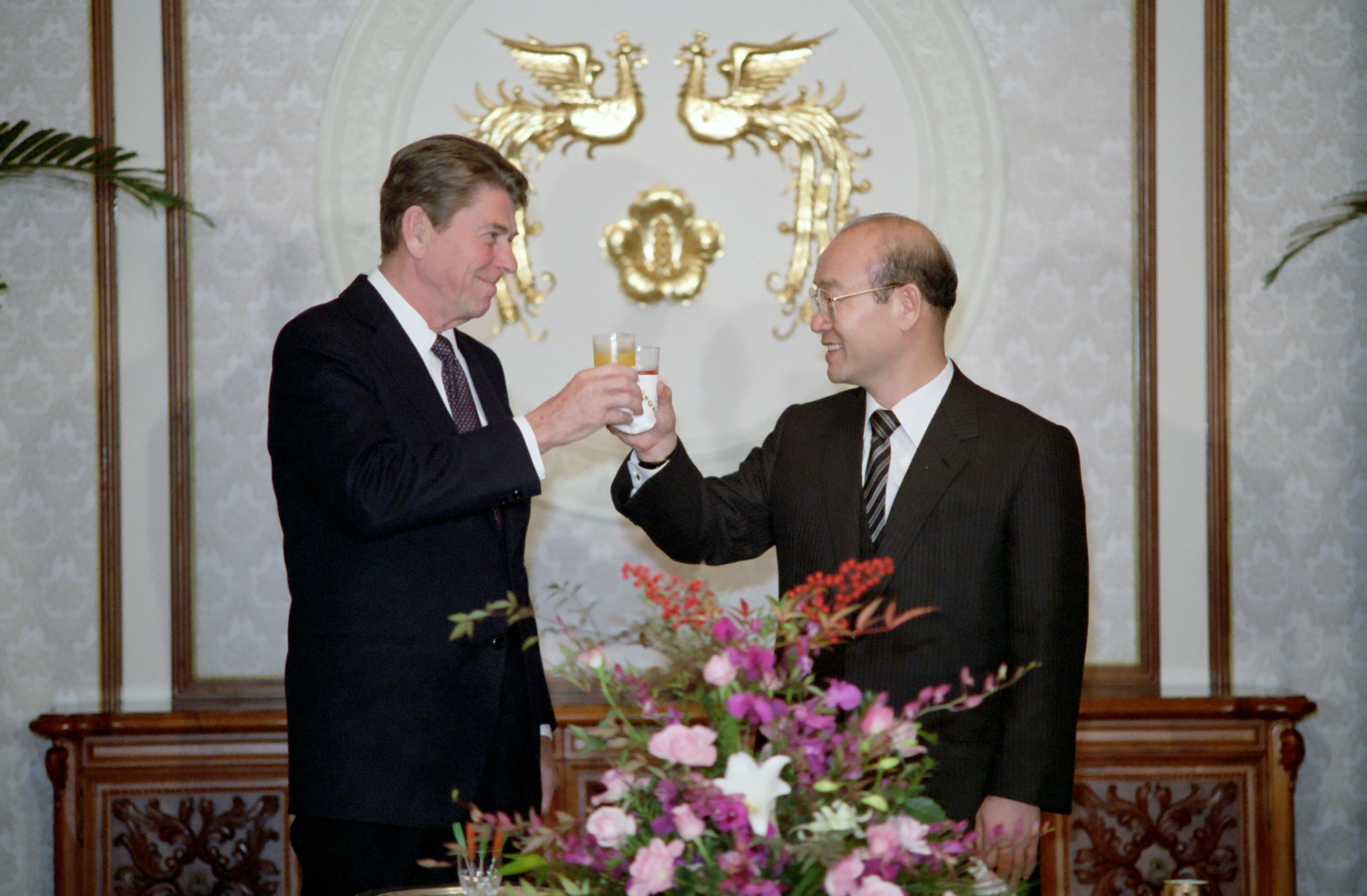
Chun with U.S. President Ronald Reagan in Seoul in November 1983

Chun's presidency occurred during the Cold War, and his foreign policies were based around combating communism from North Korea and Soviet Union. Chun eagerly pursued ties with the Reagan administration, making a critical official visit to the White House in February 1981. By aligning with U.S. Cold War strategies, Chun received vital security guarantees and political legitimacy in exchange for cooperating with U.S. regional interests, despite human rights reservations from Reagan.

Japanese newspapers widely reported that Chun was the de facto leader of the country months before he made any move to become president.

In 1982, Chun announced the "Korean People Harmony Democracy Reunification Program", but due to repeated rejections from North Korea the program was unable to get off the ground.

== End of the Fifth Republic (1987) ==
=== Noh Shin-yeong ===
From the start of his presidency, Chun began grooming Noh Shin-yeong as his eventual successor. In 1980, while working as ambassador to the Geneva Representation Bureau, Noh was recalled and made Minister of Foreign Affairs. In 1982, he was installed as the Director of the Security Planning Bureau, and in 1985, he was named Prime Minister.

A career diplomat, Noh competed for the nomination within Chun's inner circle against former General Chang Se-dong and eventual successor Roh Tae-woo. However, Noh's chances ended abruptly in May 1987 when Chun dismissed him and Chang Se-dong during a major cabinet reshuffle, triggered by a scandal surrounding the cover-up of a university student's torture and death, which ultimately cleared the path for Roh Tae-woo to secure the presidency.

=== June Struggle Democratization Movement ===
The 1981 constitution restricted the president to a single seven-year term. Unlike his predecessors, Chun was unable to amend the document in order to run again in 1987. The constitution explicitly stated that any amendments extending a president's term would not apply to the incumbent, thus foreclosing any attempt to extend Chun's tenure short of adopting a new constitution. However, he consistently resisted pleas to open up the regime.

On 13 April 1987, Chun made the "April 13th Defense of the Constitution speech". He declared that the DJP candidate for president would be one of his military supporters, and his successor would be chosen in an indirect election similar to the one that elected Chun seven years earlier. That announcement enraged his opponents and, in concert with several scandals from the Chun government that year, demonstrators began their movement again, starting with a speech at the Anglican Cathedral of Seoul.

Two months later, he declared Roh Tae-woo as the DJP's candidate for president, which, by all accounts, effectively handed Roh the presidency. Chun's move to handpick his successor without any input from the public triggered the June Democracy Movement, a series of large pro-democracy rallies across the country. In hopes of gaining control over a situation that was rapidly getting out of control, Roh made a speech on 29 June promising a much more democratic constitution and the first direct presidential elections in 16 years. On 1 July 1987, Chun gave in and agreed to democratic elections. On 10 July 1987, Chun resigned as head of the DJP, remaining its Honorary Chairman but handing official leadership of the upcoming campaign to Roh.

=== 1987 presidential election ===
In the 16 December 1987 presidential election, Roh won the election with a plurality, the first free and fair national elections of any sort held in the country in two decades, after opposition candidates Kim Young-sam and Kim Dae-jung split the popular vote. Chun finished out his term and handed over the presidency to Roh on 25 February 1988, the first peaceful transition of power in the history of South Korea.

== Post-dictatorship and prison sentence (1987–1997) ==
In February 1988, during the presidency of Roh, Chun was named chair of the National Statesman Committee and so wielded considerable influence in South Korean politics. In that year, the DJP lost its majority in the National Assembly elections to opposition parties, paving the way for the so-called "Fifth Republic Hearings". The National Assembly explored the events of the Gwangju Democratization Movement and where responsibility should lay for the resulting massacre. On 11 November 1988, Chun apologized to the nation in a public address, pledging to give his money and belongings back to the country. Chun resigned from both the National Statesman Committee and the DJP.

At this time, Chun decided to live for several years in Baekdamsa, a Buddhist temple in the Gangwon-do province, in order to pay penance for his actions. On 30 December 1990, Chun left Baekdamsa and returned home.

=== Investigations, trials, and prison sentences of Chun and Roh ===
Chun Doo-hwan
- Status: Pardoned on 21 December 1997 by President Kim Young-sam at request of President-elect Kim Dae-jung
- Convictions: Treason; Leading an insurrection Conspiracy to commit insurrection Taking part in an insurrection Illegal troop movement orders Dereliction of duty during martial law Murder of superior officers Attempted murder of superior officers Murder of subordinate troops Leading a rebellion Conspiracy to commit rebellion Taking part in a rebellion Murder for the purpose of rebellion Bribery
- Penalty: Death by hanging; commuted to life imprisonment and fine of ₩220 billion

After Kim Young-sam's inauguration as President of South Korea in 1993, Kim declared that Chun and Roh had stolen 400 billion won (nearly $370 million) from the South Korean people, and he would conduct internal investigations to prove this.

On 16 November 1995, the citizens' demands were growing louder about the 12 December 1979 military coup and the Gwangju Uprising, so Kim announced the beginning of a movement to enact retroactive legislation, naming the bill Special Act on 5–18 Democratization Movement. As soon as the Constitutional Court declared Chun's actions unconstitutional, the prosecutors began a reinvestigation. On 3 December 1995, Chun and 16 others were arrested on charges of conspiracy and insurrection. At the same time, an investigation into the corruption of their presidencies was begun.

In March 1996, their public trial began. On 26 August, the Seoul District Court issued a death sentence. On 16 December 1996, the Seoul High Court issued a sentence of life imprisonment and a fine in the amount of ₩220 billion. On 17 April 1997, the judgment was finalized in the Supreme Court. Chun was officially convicted of leading an insurrection, conspiracy to commit insurrection, taking part in an insurrection, illegal troop movement orders, dereliction of duty during martial law, murder of superior officers, attempted murder of superior officers, murder of subordinate troops, leading a rebellion, conspiracy to commit rebellion, taking part in a rebellion, and murder for the purpose of rebellion, as well as assorted crimes relating to bribery. After his sentence was finalized, Chun began serving his prison sentence.

On 22 December 1997, he was granted a pardon by President Kim Young-sam, on the advice of incoming President Kim Dae-jung. Chun was still required to pay his fine, but at that point, he had only paid ₩53.3 billion, not quite a fourth of the total fine amount. Chun made a relatively famous quote, saying, "I have only ₩290,000 to my name." The remaining ₩167.2 billion was never collected.

== Later life (1998–2021) ==
=== Revocation of related military awards ===
According to the "May 18th Special Legislation", all medals awarded for the military intervention during the Gwangju Uprising were revoked and ordered to be returned to the government. There are still nine medals that have not been returned to the government.

=== Confiscation of artworks ===
Because of Chun's unpaid fines amounting to ₩167.2 billion, a team of 90 prosecutors, tax collectors, and other investigators raided multiple locations simultaneously in July 2013, including Chun's residence and his family members' homes and offices. Television footage showed them hauling away paintings, porcelain, and expensive artifacts. Among the properties searched were two warehouses owned by publisher Chun Jae-guk, Chun's eldest son, which contained more than 350 pieces of art by famous Korean artists, some estimated to be worth ₩1 billion.

The National Assembly passed a bill called the Chun Doo-hwan Act, extending the statute of limitations on confiscating assets from public officials who have failed to pay fines. Under the old law, prosecutors had only until October 2013, but the new law extended the statute of limitations on Chun's case until 2020 and allows prosecutors to collect from his family members as well if it is proven that any of their properties originated from Chun's illegal funds.

=== Memoirs ===
Chun tried to publish three memoirs. On 4 August 2017, a court granted a petition from a group of organizations dedicated to the 18 May movement, to prohibit the publishing, sale, and distribution of the works unless 33 sections containing false statements about the 18 May Movement were removed. The court ruled that Chun and his son, Chun Jae-guk, who runs a publishing company, should take steps to prevent the books being sold—a violation of the order would incur a 5 million won fine, to be paid to the 5.18 Memorial Foundation. In October 2017, Chun reissued his memoirs prompting a second lawsuit to be filed against him. On 15 May 2018, the Gwangju District Court granted a further injunction request; in addition to the 33 sections containing false statements about the 18 May Movement found at the time of the first lawsuit, a further 36 sections were found to make false statements about the Movement.

==== Libel trial and health problems (2019–2021) ====
In March 2019, Chun appeared in a libel trial in Gwangju over his controversial memoirs, in which he allegedly defamed victims of his 1980 crackdown. Chun had disputed a testimony by the late activist priest, Cho Chul-hyun, and called him "Satan wearing a mask" in his memoirs. The priest allegedly witnessed the military firing at citizens from helicopters during the crackdown. On 30 November 2020, Chun was found guilty of defaming Cho and was sentenced to eight months in prison, suspended for two years.

Chun proceeded to appeal the sentence but failed to show up to the first and second appellate trials held on 10 May and 14 June 2021. He made his first appearance in the Gwangju District appellate court on 9 August 2021 accompanied by his wife, but looking gaunt and frail. Chun left the courtroom only 25 minutes into the hearing, due to breathing difficulties. He answered some of the judge's questions with the help of his wife and was seen dozing off. A Yonhap news report on 21 August revealed Chun was diagnosed with multiple myeloma.

== Death and funeral ==
Chun died at his home in Yeonhui-dong, Seoul, on 23 November 2021 from complications of blood cancer. Chun died less than one month after his successor Roh.

Since Chun never apologized for his role in the Gwangju Uprising and his past crimes, the Blue House only expressed private condolences to his family via a spokesperson, and announced that there was no plan to send wreaths. Following his death, the South Korean ruling and opposition parties refrained from sending official condolences.

The South Korean government also decided not to hold a state funeral for Chun, and his funeral was conducted by his family with the government providing no assistance.

His remains were taken to Seoul's Severance Hospital, where it was to be cremated before burial. By law, Chun is not eligible for burial at a national cemetery because of his past criminal record and conviction. According to his widow Lee Soon-ja, Chun had requested his family to minimize the funeral process, never make any tomb for him, and spread his ashes in areas overlooking the North Korean territory.

On 27 November 2021, during his funeral procession, Lee Soon-ja issued a brief apology over the "pains and scars" caused by Chun's brutal rule. Her apology did not mention Chun's responsibility of the suppression of Gwangju Uprising. As a result, civic groups related to the movement, including those of bereaved families, criticized her apology for being vague and incomplete, and said that they would not accept the apology.

== Later events ==
On 16 March 2023, one of Chun's grandsons, Chun Woo-won posted on Instagram, expressing his disgust and revulsion at his grandfather's acts, and stated that his parents were living off the illegal wealth accumulated by Chun and his family. He called his grandfather a "slaughterer" and described him as a criminal rather than a hero. Chun Woo-won also confessed that he took drugs, for which he was formally charged in April of that same year. South Korean prosecutors expressed that they would be reviewing the drug allegations and other allegations regarding the Chun family's illegal wealth accordingly.

Chun Woo-won visited Gwangju cemetery on 31 March 2023. He made apologies for what his grandfather had done and consoled relatives of those who died in Gwangju. He said: "The citizens of Gwangju, who overcame fear in the midst of military dictatorship and stood against it with courage are heroes and truly the light and salt of our country." Chun Woo-won was eventually found guilty of drug consumption and sentenced to 30 months' jail, suspended for four years, as well as 120 hours of community service, 80 hours of a drug treatment program and a confiscation of 2.66 million won. The court reportedly took into consideration Chun Woo-won's voluntary cooperation with the police and regret for the wrongdoing, and therefore erred on the side of leniency by handing him a suspended sentence. Civil groups reportedly petitioned for leniency on account that he took steps to apologize for his grandfather's crimes.

== Electoral record ==
Year	Elections	Constituency	Political party	No. of votes	%	Results
1980	1980 Presidential Election	South Korea	Independent	2,524	99.37%	Won
1981	1981 Presidential Election	South Korea	Democratic Justice Party	4,755	90.23%	Won

== Honours ==
=== National ===
- South Korea:
  - Recipient of the Grand Order of Mugunghwa
  - First Class of the Order of Merit for National Foundation

=== Foreign ===
- Belgium:
  - Grand Cordon of the Order of Leopold (1986)
- Brunei:
  - Family Order of Laila Utama (1984)
- Comoros:
  - Grand Cross of the Order of the Green Crescent (1987)
- The Gambia:
  - Grand Commander (GAM) of the Order of the Republic (1984)
- Indonesia:
  - Star of the Republic of Indonesia, 1st Class (1981)
- Jordan:
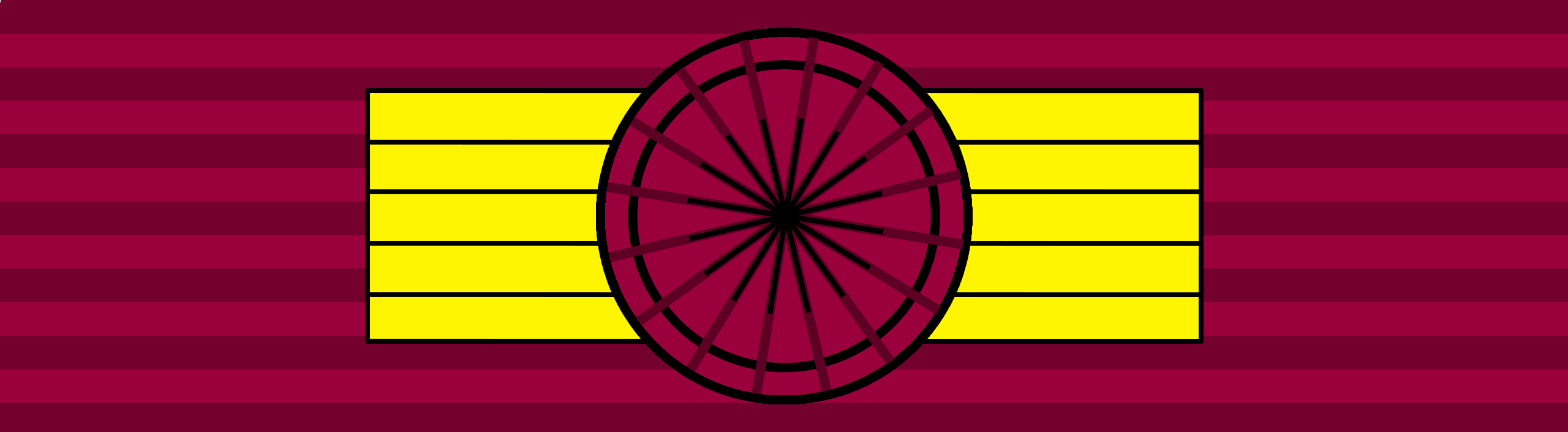
  - Grand Cordon of the Order of Al-Hussein bin Ali (1983)
- Liberia:
  - Grand Commander of the Humane Order of African Redemption (1982)
- Malaysia:
  - Honorary Recipient of the Order of the Crown of the Realm (1981)
- Maldives:
  - Grand Cordon of the Order of the Distinguished Rule of Izzuddin (1984)
- Pakistan:
  - Nishan-e-Pakistan (1985)
- Philippines:
  - Grand Collar of the Order of Sikatuna (1981)
- Qatar:
  - Collar of the Order of the Independence (1984)
- Senegal:
  - Grand Cross of the National Order of the Lion (1982)
- Thailand:
  - Knight of Order of the Rajamitrabhorn (1981)
- United Kingdom:
  - Knight Grand Cross (GCB) of the Order of the Bath (1986)
- Zaire:
  - Grand Cordon of the National Order of the Leopard (1982)

== In popular culture ==
- Chun was portrayed by South Korean actor Lee Deok-hwa in the 2005 MBC television series 5th Republic.
- Chun was referenced in the 2015 South Korean television series Reply 1988.
- The 2012 South Korean film 26 Years has a plot of an assassination plan of Chun.
- A fictional South Korean president, modelled after Chun Doo-hwan, is portrayed in a cameo by an unknown actor in the 2021 JTBC drama series Snowdrop.
- A fictional South Korean general, modeled after Chun Doo-hwan, is portrayed as "Chun Doo-gwang" in the 2023 South Korean film 12.12: The Day.
- Chun appears as a fictional character in the South Korean action thriller Hunt as a retaliatory target for a rogue military intelligence officers for his involvement the 1980 student massacre during the Rangoon Bombing.

== See also ==
- List of presidents of South Korea

== Notes ==
Political offices
Preceded by Choi Kyu-hah; Park Choong-hoon (Acting)	President of South Korea; 27 August 1980–24 February 1988	Succeeded by Roh Tae-woo
Preceded by Lee Hui-seong	Director of the Korean Central Intelligence Agency; 1980	Succeeded by Yoo Hak-seong
Military offices
Preceded by Jin Jong-chae	Commander of the Defence Security Command; 1979–1980	Succeeded by Roh Tae-woo
Party political offices
Preceded by New Office	President of Democratic Justice Party; 15 January 1981–10 July 1987	Succeeded by Roh Tae-woo
Preceded by New Office	Honor President of Democratic Justice Party; 10 July 1987–23 November 1988	Succeeded by Roh Tae-woo (Honor President of Democratic Liberal Party)
Preceded by	Independent nominee for President of South Korea; 1980	Succeeded by
Preceded by New Office	Democratic Justice Party nominee for President of South Korea; 1981	Succeeded by Roh Tae-woo
