= Coup d'état of May Seventeenth =

1980 South Korean military coup that installed Chun Doo-hwan

Date	May 17, 1980
Location	Seoul, South Korea
Result	Coup successful: Civilian government of Prime Minister Shin Hyun-hwak deposed; President Choi resigned in August 1980; Chun became president in September 1980

Belligerents
Republic of Korea Armed Forces: Shin-gun-bu military junta	Government of South Korea

Commanders and leaders
Chun Doo-hwan; Roh Tae-woo	Choi Kyu-hah; Shin Hyun-hwak

The Coup d'état of May Seventeenth (Korean: 5.17 내란; Hanja: 五一七內亂) was a military coup d'état staged by General Chun Doo-hwan on 17 May 1980 against the civilian government of President Choi Kyu-hah in South Korea.

On May 17, 1980, Chun forced the Cabinet to extend martial law to the whole nation, which had previously not applied to Jeju Province. The expanded martial law closed universities, banned political activities and further curtailed the press. To enforce the martial law, troops were dispatched to various parts of the nation. On the same day, the Korean Central Intelligence Agency (KCIA) raided a national conference of student union leaders from 55 universities. About 2,700 people, including 26 politicians, were also arrested. On May 18, 1980, citizens of Gwangju rose up against Chun's military dictatorship and took control of the city. In the course of the 9-day uprising, citizens took up arms to defend themselves but were ultimately violently crushed by the army.

In June 1980, Chun and Roh Tae-woo ordered the National Assembly and the respective political parties to be dissolved by deploying troops in the National Assembly. Chun subsequently created the National Defense Emergency Policy Committee and installed himself as the head of command. In mid-August 1980, President Choi Kyu-hah was forced to resign as president to give way to Chun, who took power in September 1980.

== Background ==
On 26 October 1979, President Park Chung Hee was assassinated by the head of the Korean Central Intelligence Agency (KCIA). Under Park, South Korea was an autocratic state. After his assassination, South Korea entered a state of transition, with attempts made to transform South Korea into a democratic nation. Despite these attempts, the Yushin Constitution was not abolished and authoritarian rule remained in place.

Choi Kyu-hah, who was the prime minister at the time, was appointed acting president, succeeding Park. With Choi in power, restrictive regulations under Park were partly repealed and opposition leaders and activists, such as Kim Dae-jung, were freed from custody. Choi became president of South Korea on 6 December 1979.

General Chun Doo-hwan, head of the Defence Security Command, was appointed to investigate the assassination of Park. During this period, Chun found opportunities to usurp power. Chun took control of the Republic of Korea Army (ROKA) on December 12, 1979, after he arrested Jeong Seung-hwa, chief of staff of the ROKA and the commander of martial law, and his associates that threatened Chun's ambitions. On 14 December, two days after gaining control of the ROKA, Chun began to appoint allies from the Korean Military Academy to powerful seats in the military to gain total control of the military forces of South Korea. Roh Tae-woo, who would later become president of South Korea, was appointed commanding general of the Capital Security Command.

Chun continued to strengthen his power during the early months of 1980, becoming director of the KCIA. Citizens of South Korea began a series of demonstrations, known as the Seoul Spring, to express their discontent that reached its peak in mid-May 1980. The army was utilized to suppress the movement. Despite the counter measures of the military, the center of Seoul was crowded with demonstrators on 12 May and more than 100,000 students gathered in the front of Seoul Station on 15 May.

== Coup ==
Starting from March 1980, with the government's continued implementation of the Yushin system, martial law, and the lack of progress in democratization, citizens of South Korea (with significant involvement of students) came together to begin the Seoul Spring demonstrations. In addition, tensions rose even more as even though South Korea had a president, Choi, real political power was held by Chun and his group of officers. Demonstrations were intensified to call for an end to Chun's rule.

On May 17, 1980, Chun declared Martial Law Decree No. 10, which expanded its reach across the whole nation. In addition, actions that would pose a threat to the government were restricted. Public criticism was prohibited from being broadcast, and publications, political gatherings and labor strikes were banned. In addition, universities were closed, political figures were apprehended, including Kim Dae-jung, Kim Yong-sam, Kim Jong-pil and Yi Hu-rak. All will be sentenced to death months after the coup.

== Martial law guidelines ==
Due to the enforcement of the martial law, South Korean universities were shut down, newspaper offices were closed, and any political activity that went against the policies of Chun were strictly banned. All public gatherings over three people were also forbidden, except funerals. With the Korean news media muzzled by martial law, only a handful of foreign correspondents present could publish reports on what was happening in Gwangju which was not an easy task, due to the army cordon. Telephone lines had been cut by the military; some reporters walked miles to villages to line up at the nearest phones still working. Suspicious activities that seemed to be promoting democracy were rigorously kept in check. Pro-democracy leaders, including students, were considered communist traitors or anti-government criminals. Police squads were sent to guard and raid the homes of individuals that promoted sedition against the regime.

== Role of the Shin-gun-bu (New Military Group) ==
The fall of a personalist leader Park did not end the military reign; instead, the Shin-gun-bu (often called the New Military Group) filled the political power vacuum. There were significant differences between Park's regime and the new regime. Park's regime had a positive impact on economic development and offered political stability for a nation that was just rebuilding from the devastating Korean War; Chun's regime on the other hand aimed to further restrict the social, political and economic system. Over time, the regime lost legitimacy.

== Aftermath ==
On 18 May, university students and citizens of Gwangju rose up in rebellion against the military junta. Amid the protests, Prime Minister Shin Hyun-hwak was forced to resign on 21 May. Choi Kyu-hah resigned as president in August 1980. On 27 August, the National Conference for Unification, the nation's electoral college voted for Chun as president with 99.96% in favor. He took power on 1 September 1980.

== See also ==
- History of South Korea
- Fifth Republic of Korea
