= Choi Kyu-hah =

President of South Korea from 1979 to 1980

- 최규하
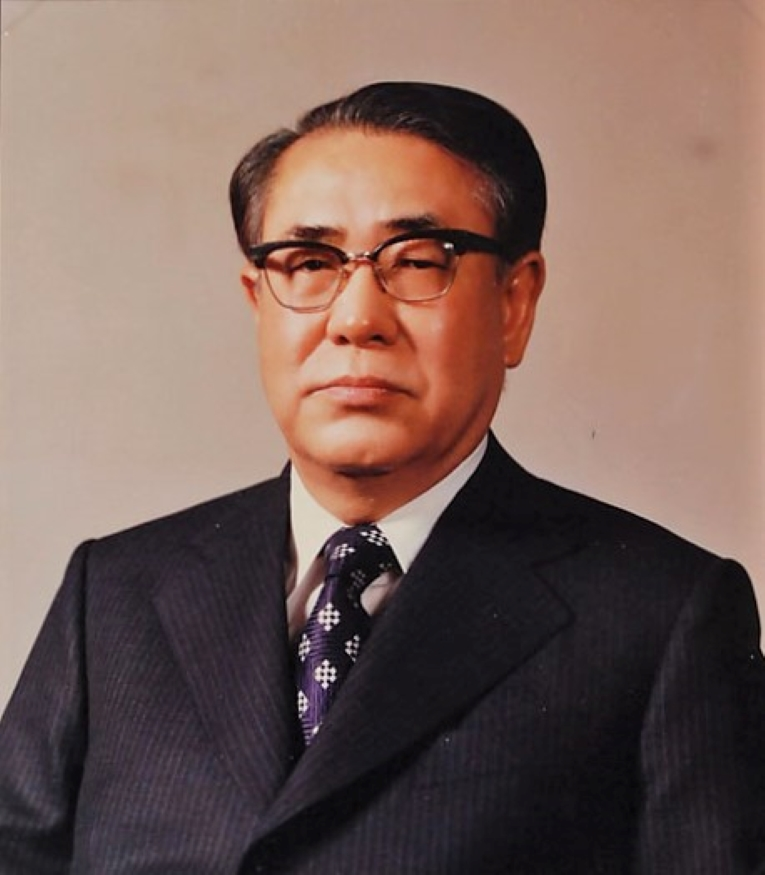
- Official portrait, 1979

4th President of South Korea
- In office 26 October 1979 (Note: Acting: 26 October – 6 December 1979) – 16 August 1980
- Prime Minister: Himself; Shin Hyun-hwak (acting); Han-bin Lee (acting); Shin Hyun-hwak; Park Choong-hoon (acting)
- Preceded by: Park Chung Hee; Himself (acting)
- Succeeded by: Park Choong-hoon (acting); Chun Doo-hwan

12th Prime Minister of South Korea
- Acting; 19 December 1975 – 12 March 1976
- President: Park Chung Hee
- Deputy: Nam Duck-woo; Shin Hyun-hwak
- Preceded by: Kim Jong-pil
- Succeeded by: Himself
- In office 13 March 1976 – 5 December 1979 (Note: Shin Hyun-hwak served as acting prime minister from 15 to 22 November 1979.)
- President: Park Chung Hee
- Preceded by: Himself
- Succeeded by: Han-bin Lee (acting); Shin Hyun-hwak

Minister of Foreign Affairs
- In office 30 June 1967 – 4 June 1971
- President: Park Chung Hee
- Preceded by: Chung Il-kwon
- Succeeded by: Kim Yong-shik

Personal details
- Born: 16 July 1919 Genshū-gun, Kōgen-dō, Korea, Empire of Japan
- Died: 22 October 2006 (aged 87) Mapo, Seoul, South Korea
- Resting place: Daejeon National Cemetery
- Party: Independent
- Spouse: Hong Gi (m. 1935; died 2004)
- Education: Tokyo Higher Normal School; Kangwon National University (Honorary Doctor of Laws)

Korean name
- Hangul: 최규하
- Hanja: 崔圭夏
- RR: Choe Gyuha
- MR: Ch'oe Kyuha

Art name
- Hangul: 현석
- Hanja: 玄石
- RR: Hyeonseok
- MR: Hyŏnsŏk

Courtesy name
- Hangul: 서옥
- Hanja: 瑞玉
- RR: Seook
- MR: Sŏok

Choi Kyu-hah (Korean: 최규하, pronounced [tɕʰø ɡjuha, - kjuha]; 16 July 1919 – 22 October 2006) was a South Korean politician who served as the fourth president of South Korea from 1979 to 1980. An independent politician, he served as the prime minister under the administration of President Park Chung Hee from 1975 to 1979.

== Early life ==
Choi was born in Wonju-myeon, Wonju, Kōgen-dō, Korea, Empire of Japan (now in Gangwon Province, South Korea). Choi was born into a yangban (upper class) family; his grandfather had been a scholar at the Sungkyunkwan. During this period, Choi used the Japanese name Umehara Keiichi (梅原圭一).

After graduating from Kyunggi High School and the Tokyo Higher Normal School (today the University of Tsukuba) with diplomas in English language and literature, Choi briefly worked as a teacher at the Taikyū Public Junior High School, before moving to Manchukuo for studies at the Taidō Academy. Choi graduated in 1943; two years later he became a professor at the Seoul National University of Education.

Choi served as Vice Minister of Foreign Affairs in 1959, Ambassador to Malaysia from 1964 to 1967, and Minister of Foreign Affairs of South Korea from 1967 to ~1972.

== Presidency (1979–1980) ==
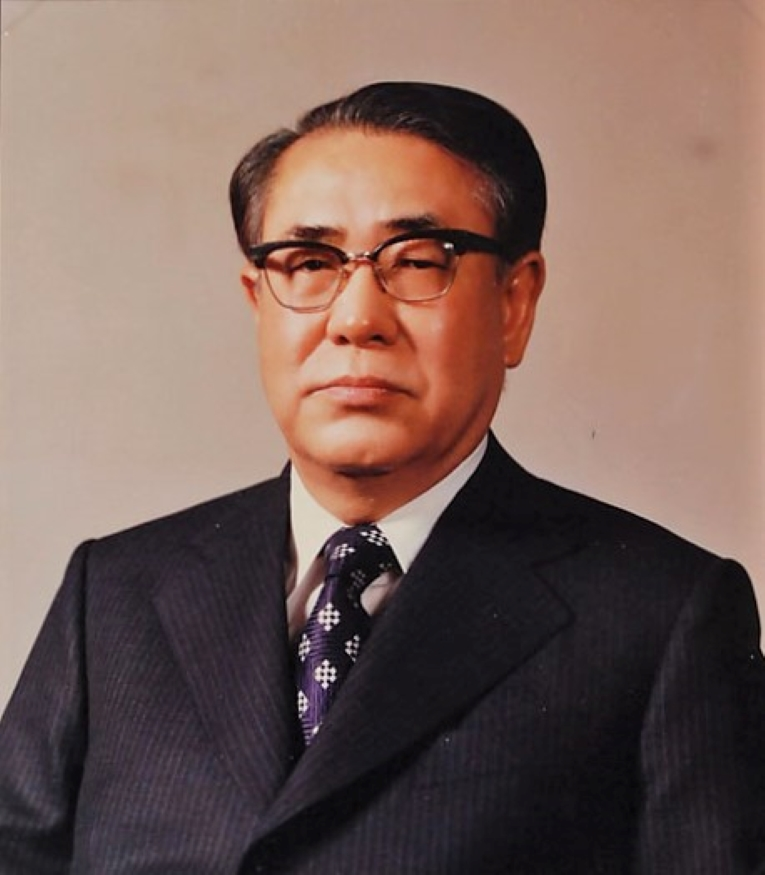
- Official portrait, 1979
- Presidency of Choi Kyu-hah; 6 December 1979 – 16 August 1980
- Prime Minister: Shin Hyun-hwak; Park Choong-hoon (acting)
- Cabinet: Full list
- Party: Independent
- Election: 1979
- Seat: Seoul
- Constituency: Fourth Republic

After the assassination of Park Chung Hee in 1979, Choi became acting president; the prime minister stood next in line for the presidency under Article 48 of the Yushin Constitution. Due to the unrest resulting from Park's authoritarian rule, Choi promised democratic elections, as under Park elections had been widely seen as rigged. Choi also promised a new constitution to replace the highly authoritarian Yushin Constitution. Choi was the sole candidate in an election on 6 December for the balance of Park's term, becoming the country's fourth president.

=== Coup and resignation ===
On 12 December 1979, Major General Chun Doo-hwan and close allies within the military staged a coup d'état against Choi's government. They quickly removed the army chief of staff and other loyalists who had sworn loyalty to Choi based on his promise of a more open society. Rejecting an arrest warrant for the chief of staff early that evening, Choi only approved it retrospectively after they had already been arrested by the morning of 13 December. Chun virtually controlled the government by early 1980, with Choi rendered as a mere figurehead.

In April 1980, due to increasing pressure from Chun and other politicians, Choi appointed Chun head of the Korean Central Intelligence Agency. He attempted to press ahead with new elections laws as part of the so-called Seoul Spring. In May, Chun declared martial law and dropped all pretense of civilian government, becoming the de facto ruler of the country and reducing Choi to a figurehead. By then, student protests were escalating in Seoul and Gwangju. The protests in Gwangju resulted in the Gwangju uprising in which at least 200 civilians were killed within that period by Chun's military.

Persuaded by Kim Chung-yul, Choi was forced to resign, stating he wished to "leave behind a precedent of peaceful transfer of power." Prime Minister Park Choong-hoon became acting president, until Chun's election as President on 1 September 1980.

== Post-presidency (1980–2006) ==
After his resignation, Choi lived quietly out of the public eye and died on 22 October 2006. His funeral was held on 26 October 2006, and was attended by President Roh Moo-hyun, first lady Kwon Yang-sook, Prime Minister Han Myeong-sook, and former presidents Chun Doo-hwan, Kim Young-sam and Kim Dae-jung. Choi was buried in Daejeon National Cemetery.

== Electoral record ==
Year	Elections	Constituency	Political party	No. of votes	%	Results
1979	1979 Presidential Election	South Korea	Independent	2,465	96.29%	Won

== Honours ==
=== National ===
- South Korea:
  - Recipient of the Grand Order of Mugunghwa

=== Foreign ===
Order of King Abdulaziz (Saudi Arabia)
Order of Mubarak the Great (Kuwait)

== In popular culture ==
The 2023 South Korean movie 12.12: The Day portrays President Choi under the pseudonym "Choi Han-gyu".

== See also ==
- List of presidents of South Korea

== Notes ==
Political offices
Preceded by Park Chung Hee	President of South Korea (Acting); 26 October 1979–6 December 1979	Succeeded by Himself
Preceded by Park Chung Hee; Himself (Acting)	President of South Korea; 6 December 1979–16 August 1980	Succeeded by Park Choong-hoon (Acting); Chun Doo-hwan
Preceded by Kim Jong-pil	Prime Minister of South Korea; 18 December 1975–26 October 1979	Succeeded by Shin Hyun-hwak
Preceded by Chung Il-kwon	Minister of Foreign; 30 June 1967–4 June 1971	Succeeded by Kim Yong-shik
Preceded by	Independent nominee for President of South Korea; 1979	Succeeded by
