= 1979 South Korean coup d'état =

1979 coup d'état in South Korea that brought Chun Doo-hwan to power

Coup d'état of December Twelfth
Date	12 December 1979
Location	Seoul, South Korea
Result	Mutiny successful; Shingunbu military group became the new head of the Republic of Korea Armed Forces; Beginning of consolidation of power under Major General Chun Doo-hwan

Belligerents
Shingunbu; Hanahoe military clique; Military Security Command	Government of South Korea; Ministry of National Defense; Joint Chiefs of Staff; Special Warfare Command

Commanders and leaders
Chun Doo-hwan; Roh Tae-woo	Choi Kyu-hah; Jeong Seung-hwa; Jang Tae-wan; Jung Byeong-joo

Casualties and losses
11 killed, 15 wounded 1 Truck destroyed	5 killed, 5 wounded

The coup d'état of December Twelfth or the 12·12 Military Insurrection (Korean: 12·12 군사 반란; Hanja: 十二十二軍事反亂) was a mutiny which took place on 12 December 1979, in South Korea, where a secret society of military officers known as Hanahoe led by Major General Chun Doo-hwan mutinied against the Chief of Staff of the Republic of Korea Army General Jeong Seung-hwa. The coup led to Chun strengthening his military and political position in South Korea, leading to his outright seizure of power as president in 1980.

== Background ==
The assassination of the 3rd President of South Korea, Park Chung Hee, on 26 October 1979 had thrown South Korea into a state of political turmoil. Prime Minister Choi Kyu-hah immediately became acting President and declared a state of martial law across the nation with the exception of Cheju. He appointed Chief of Staff of the Army General Jeong Seung-hwa to oversee the operation of martial law. Jeong appointed Major General Chun Doo-hwan, commander of the Defence Security Command to investigate Park's assassination. Jeong, Chun and Chairman of the Joint Chiefs of Staff Kim Jong-hwan were then the most powerful figures in the military.

According to official investigations, President Park's assassin and director of KCIA Kim Jae-gyu had approached Jeong, who was present at the scene of the assassination (though not a witness) to take command of the situation after his assassination, but Jeong refused.

Chun, who harbored political ambitions, was a rival to Jeong, given that the Military Security Command served as a hedge against any potential military coup under President Park. Jeong moved to reassign Chun, Roh Tae-woo, and other members of Hanahoe to less important posts to sideline them and prevent Hanahoe’s rise. Fearing their careers were at stake, Chun and the rest of Hanahoe moved before Jeong could render them politically impotent.

== Mutiny ==
On the evening of 12 December 1979, Chun, acting without authorization from President Choi, ordered the arrest of Jeong on allegations of involvement in the assassination of former President Park. Minister of National Defense Roh Jae-hyun fled from his position and brought his entire family to the Yongsan Garrison to seek protection in the U.S. embassy before being advised to return to duty. After reluctantly returning to the army command, he refused to order the arrest of Chun or other rebel generals. Instead, he ordered the arrest of Jeong to appease the rebels. Shortly thereafter, he withdrew from politics.

After Jeong's capture, the 29th Regiment of the 9th Division, along with the 1st and the 3rd Special Forces Brigade, invaded downtown Seoul to support the 30th and 33rd Capital Security Groups, which were loyal to Chun, resulting in a series of clashes that broke out in the capital. Two of Jeong's allies, Major General Jang Tae-wan (Commander of Army Capital Security Command) and Major General Jeong Byeong-ju (Commander of Army Special Warfare Command), were also arrested by the rebel troops. Major Kim Oh-rang, aide-de-camp of Jeong Byeong-ju, was killed during the gunfight.

By the next morning, the Ministry of Defense and Army Headquarters were occupied by the mutineers. Chun and his fellow graduates of the 11th class of the Korea Military Academy, such as Major General Roh Tae-woo, commanding general of the 9th Infantry Division, and Major General Jeong Ho-yong, were in charge of the Korean ground forces. Chun's mutiny and the subsequent consolidation of power was aided by the powerful private club of military officials known as Hanahoe. The Navy and Air Force did not participate in the mutiny, but Chun subsequently co-opted them following its success. In addition, the only Marine Corps involvement in the coup was by Jeong's residential guards, who engaged in armed confrontation with the 33rd MP. Chun became the de facto commander-in-chief, rather than President Choi Kyu-hah.

== Aftermath ==
Jeong Seung-hwa was sentenced to 10 years imprisonment in a court-martial on 13 March 1980, while Jang Tae-wan and Jeong Byeong-ju were forcibly discharged from military service and placed under house arrest. In January 1980, the South Korean military underwent a massive reorganization. Since then, any generals who had made critical remarks about the mutiny, either in public or in private, were either forced to leave their posts or were transferred to other positions.

Meanwhile, the United States failed to intervene as Chun carried out the mutiny. According to The New York Times, Chun mobilized military divisions stationed near the Demilitarized Zone (DMZ) to enter Seoul without notifying General John A. Wickham Jr., the commander of the US-led ROK/US Combined Forces Command (CFC). U.S. Ambassador William H. Gleysteen's post-mutiny assessment spoke of how the U.S. "missionary work" to guide the new government "seems washed down the drain". A diplomat at the time commented to The New York Times that American foreign policy in South Korea for the past three decades was "crumbling in their hands." After the mutiny, the Carter administration then chose to prioritize regional stability over South Korea's democratic transition, deeply fearing that political chaos could trigger an invasion by North Korea. Influenced by the events in revolutionary Iran, top Carter administration officials, including diplomat Richard Holbrooke, strongly discouraged any American actions that might unravel the South Korean government, explicitly stating, "Nobody wants another Iran". General Wickham and Ambassador Gleysteen ultimately decided against intervening militarily or forcefully condemning the rebel generals, fearing that a direct confrontation or an attempted counter-coup could trigger violent conflicts between South Korean military factions.

The mutiny marked the beginning of the end of the Fourth Republic of Korea. The mutiny, the coup d'etat of the civilian government on 17 May 1980, alongside the Gwangju Uprising, was the primary justification for Chun's 1995 arrest by the Kim Young-sam administration.

In 2022, a presidential commission on military deaths reclassified Kim Oh-rang's death during the coup as having been "killed in action" rather than having "died on duty". The redesignation meant that Kim's death was officially attributed to engagement with the enemy or while preventing disturbances to public peace, such as a rebellion. In 2025, the Seoul Central District Court ordered the government to provide 300 million won (US$216,000) in compensation to the Kim's relatives following a lawsuit filed by his family.

== Cultural references ==
=== Film ===
- 12.12: The Day (2023)

=== Television ===
- 4th Republic (1995–96)
- 5th Republic (2005)
- Koreagate (1995)
- Surprise Mystery TV – 12.12: The Day (2023)

== See also ==
- History of South Korea
- Fifth Republic of Korea
