= 1978 South Korean presidential election =

- 6 July 1978

2,581 members of the National Conference for Unification 1,291 votes needed to win
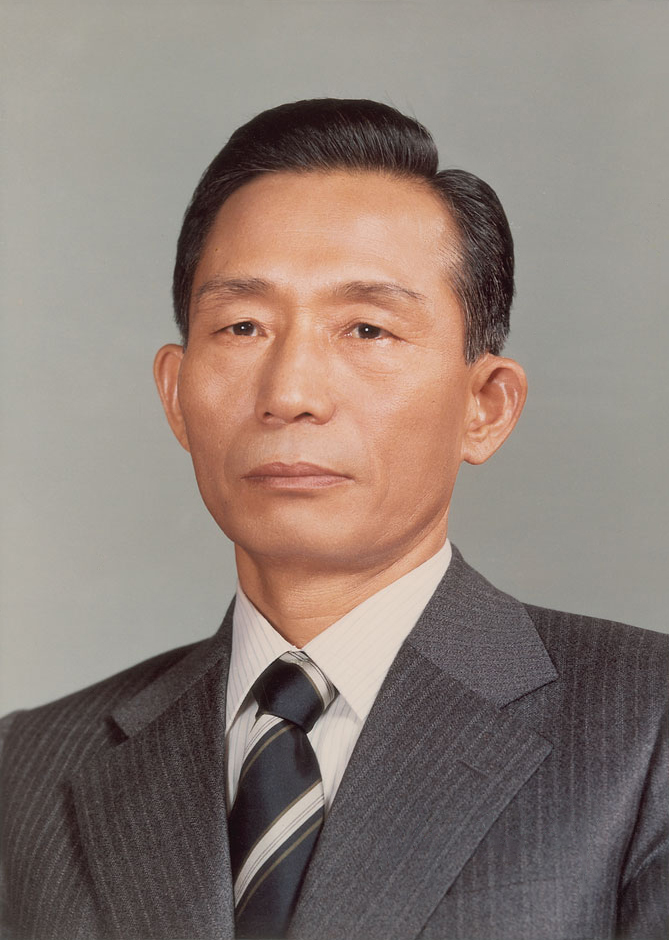
Nominee	Park Chung-hee
Party	Democratic Republican
Electoral vote	2,577
Percentage	99.85%
- Votes of the National Conference for Unification Park Chung-hee: 2577 Did not vote: 3 Invalid/Blank: 1
President before election
Park Chung-hee
Democratic Republican
Elected President
Park Chung-hee
Democratic Republican

Presidential elections were held in South Korea on 6 July 1978, the second elections held under the Restoration Constitution, which gave the members of the National Conference for Unification the power to elect the president.

The National Conference for Unification was elected on 18 May, and the newly sworn-in delegates proceeded to elect the president on 6 July. As in 1972, incumbent President Park Chung-hee was the only candidate. He was duly re-elected with the support of 2,577 of the 2,581 members. Park Chung Hee would continue in office for just over a year before his assassination on 26 October 1979 and the subsequent collapse of the Yushin regime.

== National Conference for Unification election ==
The 2,583 members of the second National Conference for Unification were elected on 18 May 1978, with a voter turnout of 79%.

Province/City	Turnout	%	Valid votes	Delegates	+/–
Seoul	2,754,086	67.8	2,665,140	391 (Note: Two delegates were absent during the presidential election.)	+88
Busan	942,148	77.1	919,727	145	+41
Gyeonggi	1,634,742	78.2	1,593,630	319	+39
Gangwon	764,857	86.9	746,432	151	+6
North Chungcheong	577,877	87.0	562,148	131	+4
South Chungcheong	1,068,658	83.4	1,038,174	235 (Note: One seat was vacant as of 6 July 1978.)	+4
North Jeolla	905,394	84.9	876,166	203	+3
South Jeolla	1,402,831	81.5	1,356,531	312	0
North Gyeongsang	1,833,990	84.4	1,790,763	379	+25
South Gyeongsang	1,255,860	83.0	1,223,490	290 (Note: One delegate was absent during the presidential election.)	+12
Jeju	178,633	86.9	173,977	27	+2
Total	13,319,076	78.9	12,946,178	2,583	+224

The National Conference for Unification members elected in 1978 would later approve Park's slate of nominees for one-third of the National Assembly in December 1978, elect Choi Kyu-hah as president in 1979 after Park's assassination, and confirm Chun Doo-hwan as president in 1980 after Choi's overthrow.

== Presidential election ==
By the time of the presidential election, one delegate had resigned and another had died, meaning there were a total of 2,581 delegates at the Conference on the day of the presidential election.

In order to be elected, a candidate had to receive the vote of over 50% of the incumbent members. With 2,581 delegates in office, Park had to receive at least 1,291 votes to be elected. He received 2,577 votes, 99.85% of the total possible.

As there was only one candidate registered, the only ways the delegates could express opposition to Park was by either abstaining or casting invalid ballots. The only delegate who cast a protest vote was Park Seung-guk of Daegu-2 District.

Candidate	Party	Votes	%
Park Chung-hee	Democratic Republican Party	2,577	100.00
Total		2,577	100.00
Valid votes		2,577	99.96
Invalid/blank votes		1	0.04
Total votes		2,578	100.00
Registered voters/turnout		2,581	99.88
