= 1976 South Korean legislative election =

- 16 February 1976
- 73 seats of the National Assembly for Presidential appointees
Party	Leader	Vote %	Seats	+/–
Independents	Park Chung Hee	99.65	73	0
This lists parties that won seats. See the complete results below.

An indirect legislative election was held in South Korea on 16 February 1976 to elect 73 members of the National Assembly appointed by President Park Chung Hee.

== Electoral system ==
One-third of all the members of the National Assembly are elected by the National Conference for Unification. The National Assembly members elected by the National Conference for Unification are recommended by the President. In order to be elected, the slate of members appointed by the President needs to receive the approval of a majority of the delegates of the National Conference for Unification present in the election. The election is valid if a majority of all the delegates of the National Conference for Unification are present.

National Assembly members elected by the National Conference for Unification have a term of three years, half the term of the directly-elected members.

The National Conference for Unification members which participated in this election were elected in 1972, in the lead-up to that year's presidential election.

== Candidates ==
On 14 February 1976, President Park Chung Hee submitted a list of 73 members he had appointed to the National Assembly and five reserve members. Among the 73 members he had appointed, 50 were members who Park had appointed in 1973 and 20 were new appointees.

== Election ==
The National Conference for Unification met on 16 February 1976 to elect the National Assembly members appointed by President Park Chung Hee.

At the time of the election, 2,303 out of the original 2,359 delegates were eligible to vote following the death or resignation of 56 delegates. Out of the 2,303 eligible delegates, 2,289 were present in the election.

== Result ==
Party	Votes	%	Seats
Presidential appointees	2,274	99.65	73
Against	8	0.35	–
Total	2,282	100.00	73
Valid votes	2,282	99.69	
Invalid/blank votes	7	0.31	
Total votes	2,289	100.00	
Registered voters/turnout	2,303	99.39	
Source: JoongAng Ilbo

=== By city/province ===
Region	Votes			Delegates		
Region	For	Against	Invalid	Voted	Absent	Total
Seoul	287	0	2	289	3	292
Busan	99	1	1	101	0	101
Gyeonggi	269	0	1	270	2	272
Gangwon	142	0	0	142	1	143
North Chungcheong	122	0	0	122	0	122
South Chungcheong	219	0	2	221	1	222
North Jeolla	196	0	0	196	2	198
South Jeolla	301	2	0	303	2	305
North Gyeongsang	348	1	0	349	1	350
South Gyeongsang	267	4	1	272	2	274
Jeju	24	0	0	24	0	24
Total	2,274	8	7	2,289	14	2,303
