= Park Jae-ok =

Daughter of Park Chung Hee (1937–2020)

- Born: November 24, 1937; Gumi, Keishōhoku Province, Korea, Empire of Japan
- Died: July 8, 2020 (aged 82); Seoul, South Korea
- Parents: Park Chung Hee (father); Kim Ho-nam (mother)
- Relatives: Park Geun-hye (half-sister)

Korean name
- Hangul: 박재옥
- Hanja: 朴在玉
- RR: Bak Jaeok
- MR: Pak Chaeok

Park Jae-ok (Korean: 박재옥; November 24, 1937 – July 8, 2020 (Note: Converted from given Korean calendar date to Gregorian calendar.)) was the first child of South Korean president Park Chung Hee and his first wife, Kim Ho-nam.

Park had a strained relationship with her father. Her father had been both absent and distant to her and her mother, and eventually surprised them both with a divorce request in 1950. She and her mother were made to leave the household, and Park Chung Hee left her mother when Park Jae-ok was 14 years and moved between places. Her father later made an attempt to repair the relationship, but the two did not get along even until his death. Her mother married a different man, and spent much of the rest of her life in a Buddhist temple.

Unlike her half-siblings, especially President Park Geun-hye, Park Jae-ok was rarely in the public spotlight in South Korea. She married Han Byeong-gi, who worked as a diplomat abroad for many years. Her father was assassinated in 1979. She later expressed regret that she did not accept her father's apologies during his lifetime.

== Biography ==
=== Early life ===
Park Chung Hee and Kim Ho-nam had an arranged marriage in 1936. On November 24, 1937, Park Jae-ok was born to the couple in the Park family home in Gumi, Keishōhoku Province (North Gyeongsang Province), Korea, Empire of Japan.

Her parents' marriage was unhappy. Her father often spent extensive time away from the family, and even when he was around, interacted with them little. Her mother, as was typical for Korean women at the time, had moved into her husband's household. However, she struggled to manage the large number of occupants and their poverty. Around 1950, shortly before the Korean War, Park's mother learned that Park Chung Hee wanted a divorce. By that point her mother had been working in the household for over a decade. Her mother reportedly wept bitterly, and told Park, "Something is strange about your father. I think he has another woman in Seoul. It seems like I can't be a part of this family". (Note: "너의 아버지가 아무래도 이상하다. 서울에 딴 여자가 있는 것 같구나. 어쩐지 내가 이 집 식구가 될 수는 없을 것 같아")

Her mother attempted to resist the divorce, but to no avail. Shortly afterwards, her mother married a man in Daegu. Park reportedly hated her mother's new husband, and cried frequently. When she turned fourteen, she left her mother in Daegu and moved back to Gumi. There, she moved between the Park family home and her cousin's house a number of times. She reportedly got along well with her paternal grandmother: Paek Namŭi. She reportedly sent a number of angry and resentful letters to her father, which he once responded to by telling her to work hard to overcome her problems in life. She learned in 1952 that her father had just had a new child, Park Geun-hye, with a new wife, Yuk Young-soo.

=== Seoul and reuniting with Park Chung Hee ===
After graduating from middle school, she moved to her cousin's house in Seoul (her cousin at some point became the wife of later prime minister Kim Jong-pil). There, she attended Dongduk Girls' High School. She got along well with her cousin, and wrote that she was happier living with her.

Yuk Young-soo reportedly did not know that her new husband had a daughter at the time of their marriage, and Park remained unsure until her death of when Yuk had learned of her. One day, Yuk made a surprise visit to Park's house in Seoul. Yuk invited her to come live with them, which Park accepted, because she professed to longing to be in a family.

Her father made a number of efforts to apologize to her, and to integrate her into his new family. He reportedly avoided saying anything unpleasant to her, and on multiple occasions tried to apologize when they saw each other at home. She reportedly met these apologies with coldness. Her interactions with Yuk were reportedly mostly positive, and while she liked Yuk as a person, she found it difficult to call her "mother". She noted that Yuk often seemed unhappy; she later heard from one of her father's employees that her father had been seeing other women.

After high school, she reportedly otherwise avoided interacting closely with her father and his family. She went on to attend Dongduk Women's University. During her freshman year in 1958, motivated by a desire to leave the Park household and be independent, she married Han Byeong-gi, a politician and one of her father's allies, whom she would have two sons with. After her marriage, she learned that her mother had been living in a Buddhist temple in Busan. She had a tearful reunion with her mother, whom she asked to come to Seoul. Her mother refused, and claimed to have found peace by being in the temple. Coincidentally, her father and mother had overlapped in Busan for some time, as he had worked as a commander of a military base within eyesight of the temple. However, Park felt it was unlikely they had known about each other being there.

=== During Park Chung Hee's presidency ===
In 1961, her father launched the May 16 coup, during which he seized control over the country. Fearing the new attention on her and how she could affect her father's reputation, she left for the United States. When she tried to contact her father or Yuk afterwards, she felt they brushed her off. She was rarely allowed to speak to her father. She tried to encourage her husband into entering politics, but her father and Yuk warned her against it. She never ended up living in the South Korean presidential residence, the Blue House.

Yuk was assassinated in 1974, and her father did not remarry. The last time she saw her father was in 1978. In 1979, her father was assassinated. The night before the assassination, she reportedly saw him in a dream. In the dream, she saw someone inform her father that she was nearby, but he ignored her and walked away.

== Later life and death ==
Unlike many of her half-siblings, she was rarely in the public spotlight in South Korea. This was reportedly by intent. She attended few major family events. For over half of her father's time in office, she was overseas with her husband, in the United States, Chile, and Canada. Han worked a variety of diplomatic roles during that period.

She later expressed regret for rejecting her father's apologies, and wrote that she came to understand and accept her father more as she aged.

She died in Seoul, on July 8, 2020, at the age of 83. A memorial was held for her at Severance Hospital on July 10. A number of notable lawmakers and businesspeople visited. Notably, her half-sister President Park Geun-hye was reportedly not expected to attend the funeral, as she was then on trial for corruption charges. Furthermore, Park Geun-hye did not make any public indications that she would leave prison to attend the funeral upon hearing the news.
