= Electoral college =

Set of electors who are selected to elect a candidate to a particular office

An electoral college is a body of representatives that is empowered to formally select a candidate for a specific office, most often the head of state. Electoral colleges exist in several countries and may serve to balance regional representation or ensure indirect election mechanisms. They are mostly used in the political context for a constitutional body that appoints the head of state or government, and sometimes the upper parliamentary chamber, in a democracy. Its members, called electors, are elected either by the people for this purpose (making the whole process an indirect election) or by certain subregional entities or social organizations.

If a constituent body that is not only summoned for this particular task, like a parliament, elects or appoints certain officials, it is not referred to as "electoral college" (see e.g. parliamentary system). Also, other appointing bodies (like committees appointing judges, as in Canada or Germany) normally do not fall into this definition.

== Examples ==
=== United States ===
The United States Electoral College is the only remaining electoral college in democracies where an executive president is indirectly elected via an electoral college. The other democracies that used an electoral college for these elections switched to direct elections in the 19th or 20th century.^{:215}

Proponents say, the electoral college is fundamental to American Federalism. It is based on the notion that it requires candidates for president to appeal to voters in all states, or a substantial portion of states, rather than only those with large population which might hold greater power in elections based on simple majority. Federalist No. 68, probably written by Alexander Hamilton, argued in favor of the electoral college by stating:

Talents for low intrigue, and the little arts of popularity, may alone suffice to elevate a man to the first honors in a single state; but it will require other talents, and a different kind of merit, to establish him in the esteem and confidence of the whole Union, or of so considerable a portion of it as would be necessary to make him a successful candidate for the distinguished office of President of the United States.

Another argument states that the Electoral College prevents a tyranny of the majority that would ignore the less densely populated heartland and rural states in favor of the mega-cities.

=== Pakistan ===
The president of Pakistan is indirectly elected by the Electoral College of Pakistan, consisting of the members of Parliament of Pakistan and Provincial assemblies of Pakistan.

=== India ===
The president of India is indirectly elected by the Indian Electoral College consisting of the elected members of the Parliament of India and the legislative assemblies of the states and union territories. The vice president of India has a separate electoral college consisting of all members of both houses of the Parliament of India.

=== Germany ===
The German Bundesversammlung has no other purpose than to elect the federal president of Germany. It is composed equally by members of the Bundestag and by representatives delegated by the state parliaments.

=== Italy ===
The president of Italy is elected by an electoral college which comprises both chambers of the Italian Parliament meeting in joint session, combined with 58 special electors appointed by the regional councils of the 20 regions of Italy.

=== Holy See ===
The Pope, who is head of the Catholic Church, the Holy See, and the Vatican City State, is elected by a papal conclave consisting of all cardinals under the age of 80.

=== France ===
While the president of France is directly elected, the Senate is indirectly elected by collèges électoraux in the French regions. They consist of 150,000 delegates, known as the grands électeurs, who are mainly appointed by municipal councillors. The municipal councillors themselves, as well as the regional and departmental councillors, serve ex officio as grands électeurs.

=== Guernsey ===
The States of Election has only one purpose, to elect a new jurat to the Courts in Guernsey.

== Historic examples ==
The following examples of electoral colleges used by democracies or dictatorships were replaced by other mechanisms of election, such as direct elections during periods of democratisation.

=== Americas ===
Before 1840, all presidents in Latin America were indirectly elected by legislatures or electoral colleges.^{:202}

==== Argentina ====
Argentina had the longest lasting electoral college in South America, used to elect its president and vice president, and national senators starting with the 1853 Constitution and lasting mostly until the 1994 constitutional amendment. There were a few exceptions, due to political instability in the 20th century, in which non-lasting reforms removed or suspended the electoral college. For example, the 1949 peronist amendment promoted by President Juan Perón which replaced it with direct elections by popular vote used in the 1951 and 1954 elections. After the Revolución Libertadora the 1957 constitutional convention repealed the 1949 constitutional amendment and the electoral college was reestablished from the 1958 general election.

The March 1973 and September 1973 general elections used a two-round direct election by popular vote system which was established by the outgoing military junta, which decreed in 1972 an illegal 'temporary constitutional reform' which was supposed to be later ratified by an elected constitutional convention which never happened and therefore expired. The elections between 1983 and 1993 used again the electoral college. The constitution was then amended by a wide consensus for the last time in 1994 and the electoral college was finally replaced with a modified two-round direct elections by popular vote system in use since 1995.

==== Brazil ====
Brazil initially became independent in 1822 as the Empire of Brazil, which was a constitutional monarchy. After becoming a republic in 1889, Brazil elected its president by direct popular vote until 1964, when the military dictatorship chose its president by an electoral college comprising senators, deputies, state deputies, and lawmakers in the cities. The electoral college was replaced with a two-round system direct election in 1989, after the end of the military dictatorship and the establishment of a new constitution in 1988 leading to the restoration of democracy.

==== Other cases ====
Colombia used an electoral college which was eliminated in 1910.^{:205}

Paraguay had an electoral college that was established by the 1870 Constitution, which was used to elect its president. The constitution was replaced in 1940 and the electoral college was replaced with direct elections by popular vote since 1943.

Chile had an electoral college established by the 1828 Constitution, which was used to elect its president in the elections from 1829 to 1920. The constitution was amended in 1925 and the electoral college was replaced with direct elections by popular vote since 1925. Also, the Regional Councils were elected until 2009 by provincial electoral colleges composed with communal councillors of local governments in each province; since 2013 the regional councillors are elected by popular vote.

Uruguay had until 1918 one electoral college for every department, each one of them had 15 members and elected the senator that would represent that department in the upper chamber of parliament.

=== Europe ===
Norway, from 1814 to 1905, used regional electoral colleges to elect legislators to the Storting, before switching to direct elections.^{:199–201}

France had its president elected by the legislature from 1875 to 1954. The first presidential election of the Fifth Republic which elected Charles de Gaulle was the only presidential election where the winner was determined via an electoral college. The electoral college was replaced after the 1962 referendum, with direct elections by popular vote, using a two-round system since 1965.

Finland had an electoral college for the country's president from 1925 to 1988, except 1944 (exception law), 1946 (parliament) and 1973 (extended term by exception law). Direct presidential elections were introduced in 1988, with the electoral college only electing the president in case no candidate receives more than one-half of the popular vote; starting in 1994, this was replaced by a second round by popular vote.

In Spain, during the Second Republic period (1931–1936/39) the president was elected by an electoral college comprising the Parliament members and an equal number of democratically elected members (compromisarios).

The Holy Roman Empire also had an electoral college to choose its ruler.

=== Asia ===
==== Republic of China (1947–1996) ====
The president of the Republic of China (Taiwan) was elected by the National Assembly of the Republic of China from 1948 until 1996 when democratization resulted in direct elections. The National Assembly had the similar function of electoral college except it had the power to amend the Constitution. The People's Republic of China in the mainland today elects both the president and the premier by the National People's Congress every five years similar to the National Assembly.

==== South Korean dictatorships (1972–1981) ====
During South Korea's dictatorships of the Fourth and Fifth Republics from 1972 until 1981, the president was elected by an electoral college until democratization resulted in direct elections starting in 1987. Additionally, during the Fourth Republic, one-third of members of the National Assembly were nominally elected by the same electoral college which elected the president, though in practice they were appointed by the president.

=== Africa ===
==== Apartheid South Africa (1961–1983) ====
In apartheid-era South Africa from 1961 to 1983, the state president of South Africa was appointed by all the members of the House of Assembly of South Africa and the Senate of South Africa. After the adoption of the 1983 Constitution, the new House of Assembly, House of Representatives, and House of Delegates would designate 50, 25, and 13 of their members to the electoral college respectively. The electoral college would disappear along with the apartheid government, with the president of South Africa being elected by the South African Parliament in 1994, which is still the method of election to this day.

== See also ==
- Representative democracy
