= Kim Hyun-chul (politician) =

South Korean politician (1901–1989)

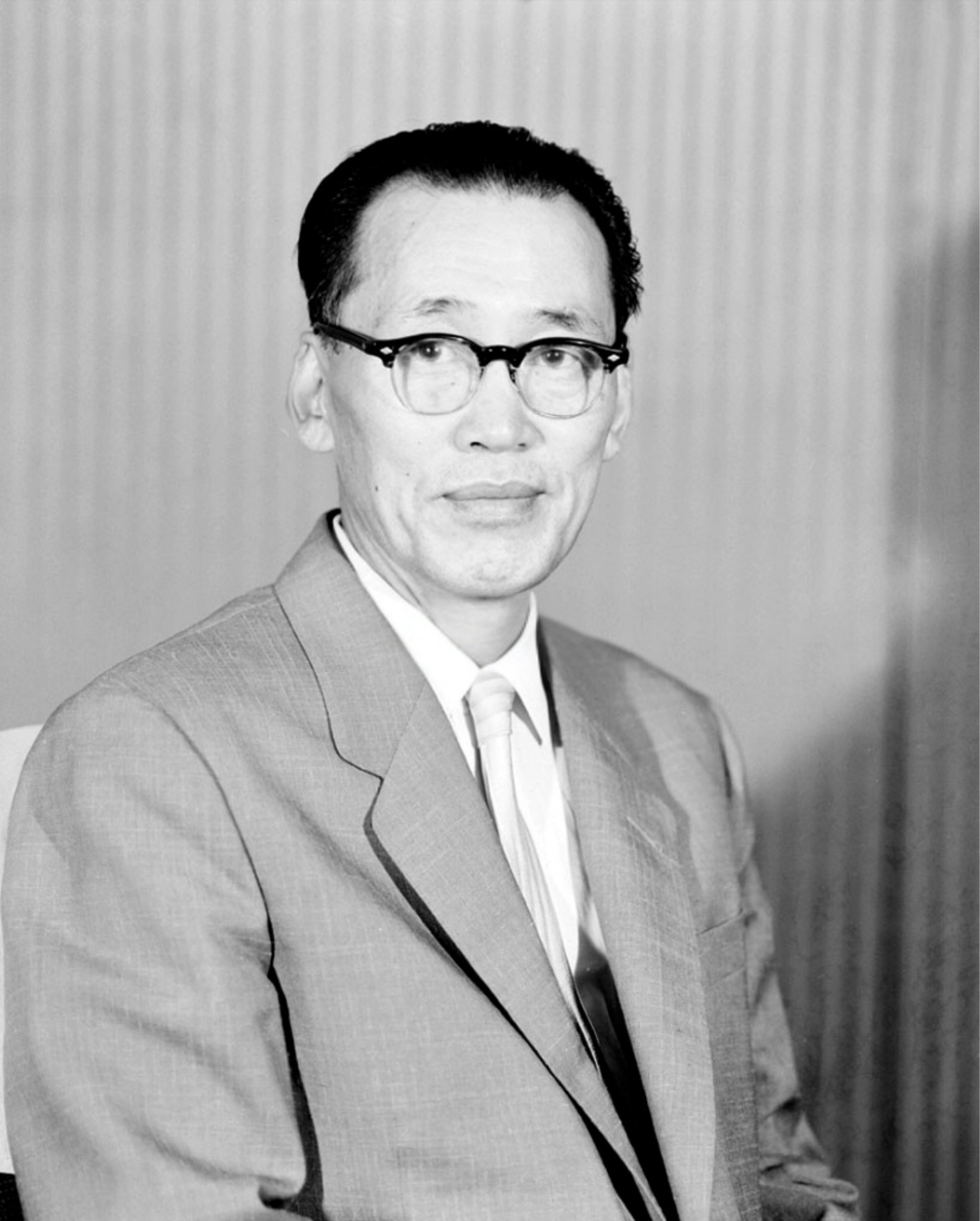

Acting Prime Minister of South Korea (Note: as 4th Chief Cabinet Minister of the Supreme Council for National Reconstruction.)
- In office July 10, 1962 – December 16, 1963
- Preceded by: Park Chung Hee (acting)
- Succeeded by: Choi Tu-son

Chief State Councilor
- In office May 19, 1956 – May 26, 1956
- President: Syngman Rhee
- Preceded by: Kim Hyung-geun (Acting); Pyon Yong-tae
- Succeeded by: Lee Ik-heung

Personal details
- Born: November 13, 1901 Hoehyeon-dong, Seoul, Korean Empire
- Died: January 27, 1989 (aged 87) Jamsil-dong, Seoul, South Korea
- Occupation: Korean independence activist

Korean name
- Hangul: 김현철
- Hanja: 金顯哲
- RR: Gim Hyeoncheol
- MR: Kim Hyŏnch'ŏl

Kim Hyun-chul (Korean: 김현철; November 13, 1901 – February 27, 1989) was a Korean independence activist, politician, and Prime Minister of South Korea.

== Biography ==
In 1917, he graduated from the Mining Department of Beijing Higher Industrial School. Afterwards, he went to study in the United States, and graduated from University of Pittsburgh in the United States in 1929, and graduated from Columbia University in the United States in 1932, and obtained a master's degree. In 1933, he served as a member of the Ministry of Foreign Affairs and Resources of the Provisional Government of the Republic of Korea Gumi. In 1953, he was appointed as the director of the planning department. In 1955, he was appointed as the deputy minister of the Ministry of Agriculture and Forestry and the Minister of Finance.

In 1962, he was appointed as the director of economic planning. After the resignation of the civilian prime minister Song Yo-chan, he began to serve as the first cabinet (prime minister) for 5 months on July 10 of that year.
