= Choi Tu-son =

South Korean politician

- 최두선
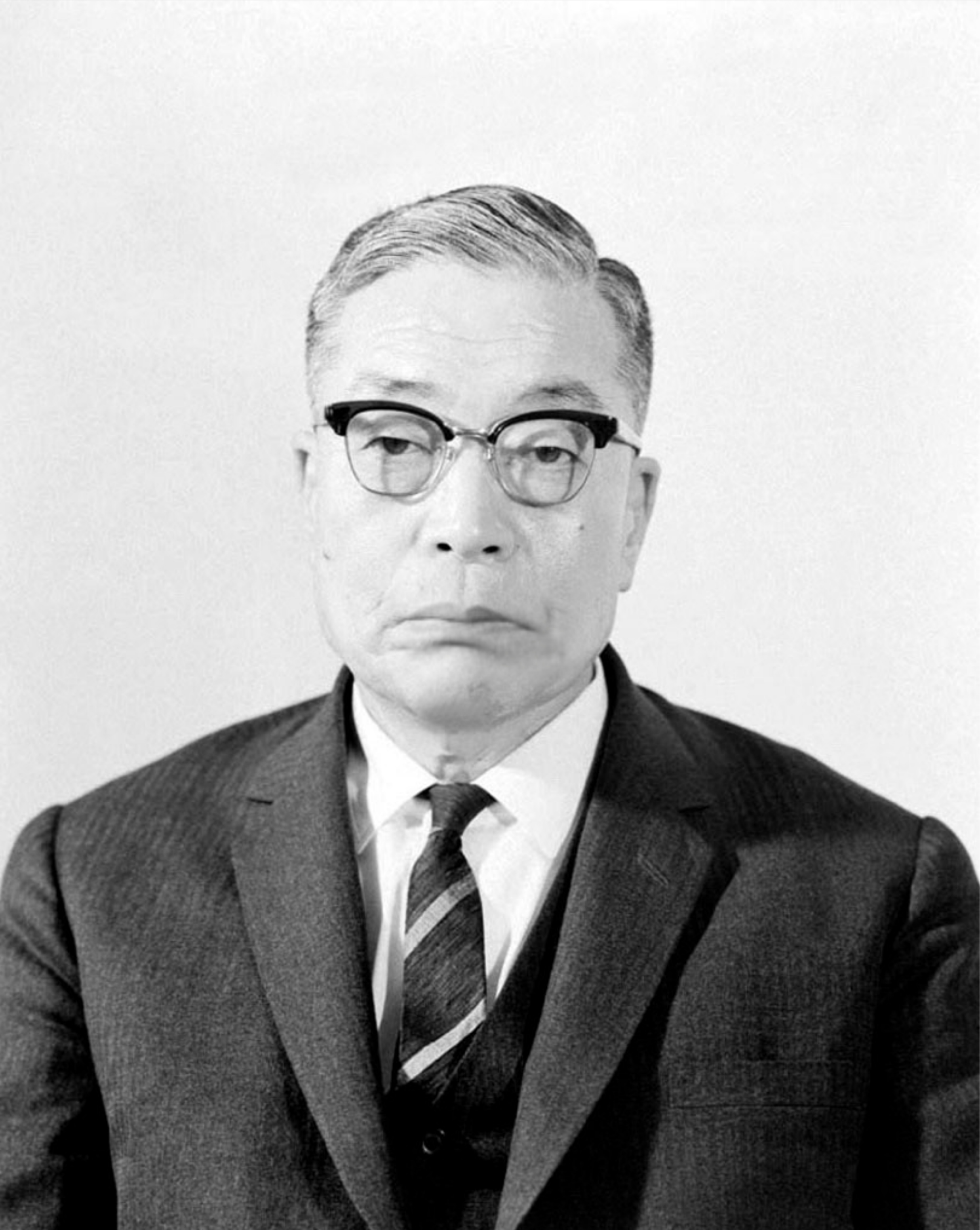

8th Prime Minister of South Korea
- In office 17 December 1963 – 9 May 1964
- President: Park Chung Hee
- Deputy: Kim Yoo-taek
- Preceded by: Kim Hyun-chul
- Succeeded by: Chung Il-kwon

Personal details
- Born: 1 November 1894 Hansŏng, Joseon (Currently Eulji-ro, Sogong-dong, Jung District, Seoul, South Korea)
- Died: 9 September 1974 (aged 79) Seoul, South Korea
- Education: Waseda University
- Occupation: Politician

Korean name
- Hangul: 최두선
- Hanja: 崔斗善
- RR: Choe Duseon
- MR: Ch'oe Tusŏn

Choi Tu-son (1 November 1894 – 9 September 1974) was a South Korean politician who served as the prime minister of South Korea from 17 December 1963 to 9 May 1964.
