= Park Chung Hee =

President of South Korea from 1963 to 1979

General Park Chung Hee
- 박정희
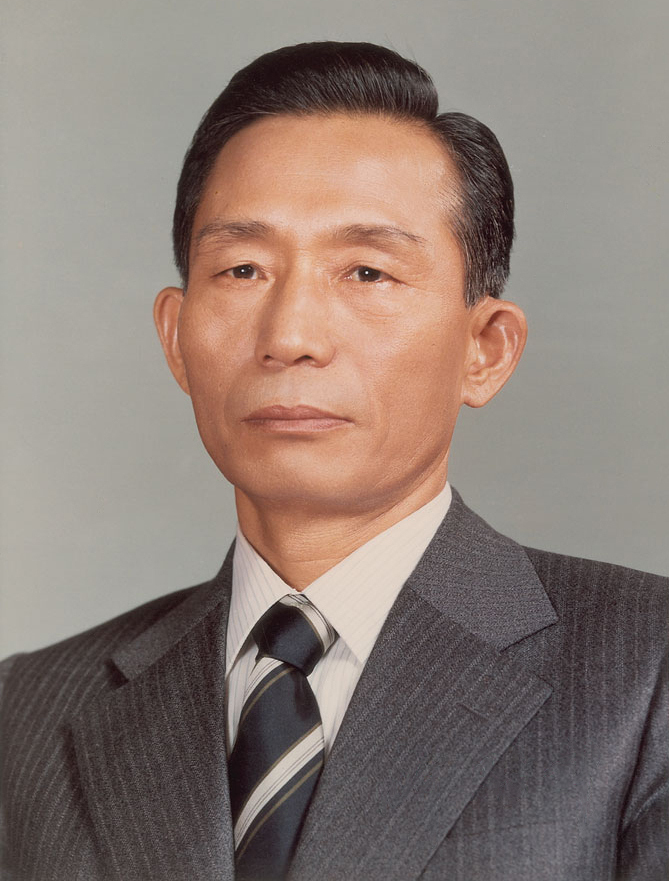
- Official portrait, 1970

3rd President of South Korea
- In office 24 March 1962 (Note: Acting: 24 March 1962 – 17 December 1963) – 26 October 1979
- Prime Minister: Song Yo-chan (acting); Himself (acting) (Note: As 3rd Chief Cabinet Minister of the Supreme Council for National Reconstruction.); Kim Hyun-chul (acting); Choi Tu-son; Chung Il-kwon; Paik Too-chin; Kim Jong-pil; Choi Kyu-hah
- Preceded by: Yun Po-sun; Himself (acting)
- Succeeded by: Choi Kyu-hah (acting); Choi Kyu-hah

Acting Prime Minister of South Korea
- In office 18 June 1962 – 9 July 1962
- President: Himself (acting)
- Preceded by: Song Yo-chan (acting)
- Succeeded by: Kim Hyun-chul (acting)

Leader of South Korea
- De facto 16 May 1961 – 17 December 1963
- President: Yun Po-sun
- Prime Minister: Song Yo-chan (acting)
- Preceded by: Chang Myon (as Prime Minister)
- Succeeded by: Himself (as President)

Chairman of the Supreme Council for National Reconstruction
- In office 3 July 1961 – 17 December 1963
- Deputy: Lee Ju-il
- Preceded by: Chang Do-yong
- Succeeded by: Position abolished

Deputy Chairman of the Supreme Council for National Reconstruction
- In office 16 May 1961 – 2 July 1961
- Chairman: Chang Do-yong
- Preceded by: Position established
- Succeeded by: Lee Ju-il

Personal details
- Born: 14 November 1917 Gumi, Korea, Empire of Japan
- Died: 26 October 1979 (aged 61) Jongno District, Seoul, South Korea
- Cause of death: Assassination
- Resting place: Seoul National Cemetery
- Party: Democratic Republican
- Other political affiliations: Workers' Party of South Korea (1946–1948)
- Spouses: Kim Ho-nam (m. 1936; div. 1950); Yuk Young-soo (m. 1950; died 1974)
- Children: Park Jae-ok; Park Geun Hye; Park Geun-ryeong; Park Ji-man
- Parents: Pak Sŏngbin (father); Paek Namŭi (mother)
- Relatives: Park Sang Hee (brother)
- Education: Manchukuo Army Military Academy; Imperial Japanese Army Academy; Korea Military Academy

Military service
- Allegiance: Empire of Japan: Manchukuo; South Korea
- Branch/service: Manchukuo Imperial Army; Korean Constabulary; Republic of Korea Army
- Years of service: 1944–1963
- Rank: Lieutenant; General
- Battles/wars: World War II; Korean War; Korean DMZ Conflict

Korean name
- Hangul: 박정희
- Hanja: 朴正熙
- RR: Bak Jeonghui
- MR: Pak Chŏnghŭi
- IPA: [pak̚ tɕ͈ʌŋʝi]

Art name
- Hangul: 중수
- Hanja: 中樹
- RR: Jungsu
- MR: Chungsu

Park Chung Hee (Korean: 박정희, pronounced [pak̚ tɕ͈ʌ̹ŋʝi]; 14 November 1917 – 26 October 1979) was a South Korean politician and army officer who seized power in the May 16 coup of 1961, and served as the third President of South Korea from 1962 until his assassination in 1979. His regime oversaw a period of intense economic growth and transformation, making Park one of the most consequential leaders in Korean history, although his legacy as a military dictator remains a bitter subject.

Before his presidency, Park was the second-highest-ranking officer in the South Korean army. His coup brought an end to the interim Second Republic of Korea. After serving for two years as chairman of the military junta, he was elected president in 1963, ushering in the Third Republic. A firm anti-communist, he continued to maintain close ties with the United States, which had maintained a large Army garrison in the country since the end of the Korean War. He supported American military involvement in Southeast Asia, and sent South Korean troops to fight in Vietnam soon after seizing power. Park began a series of economic reforms that eventually led to rapid and unprecedented economic growth and industrialization, a phenomenon that is now known as the Miracle on the Han River. This made South Korea one of the fastest growing economies of the 1960s and 1970s, albeit with costs to labor rights. This era also saw the formation of chaebols: family companies supported by the state similar to the Japanese zaibatsu. Examples of significant chaebols include Hyundai, LG, and Samsung.

Although popular during the 1960s, Park's popularity started to plateau by the 1970s, with closer than expected victories during the 1971 presidential election and the subsequent legislative elections. In 1972, Park declared martial law after carrying out a self-coup. He then introduced the highly authoritarian Yushin Constitution, ushering in the Fourth Republic. Now ruling as a dictator, he constantly repressed political opposition and dissent and completely controlled the military. He also had much control over the media and expressions of art. In 1979, Park was assassinated by his close friend Kim Jae-gyu, director of the KCIA, following the Busan–Masan Uprising. Whether the assassination was spontaneous or premeditated remains unclear to this day. Economic growth continued in spite of the 1979 coup d'état and considerable political turmoil in the wake of his assassination. He was soon afterwards succeeded by Choi Kyu-hah, who ruled for only a year before being deposed by career army officer Chun Doo-hwan. The country eventually democratized with the June Democratic Struggle in 1987.

Park remains a controversial figure in modern South Korean political discourse and among the South Korean populace in general, making a detached evaluation of his tenure difficult. While some credit him for sustaining economic growth that reshaped and modernized South Korea, others criticize his authoritarian governance (especially after 1971) as well as for prioritizing economic growth and social order at the expense of civil liberties and human rights. A Gallup Korea poll in October 2021 showed Park, Kim Dae-jung (an old opponent of Park whom he tried to have executed), and Roh Moo-hyun as the most highly rated presidents of South Korean history in terms of leaving a positive legacy, especially among South Korean conservatives and the elderly. Park's daughter Park Geun Hye later served as the 11th president of South Korea from 2013 until she was impeached and convicted of various corruption charges in 2017.

== Early life and education ==
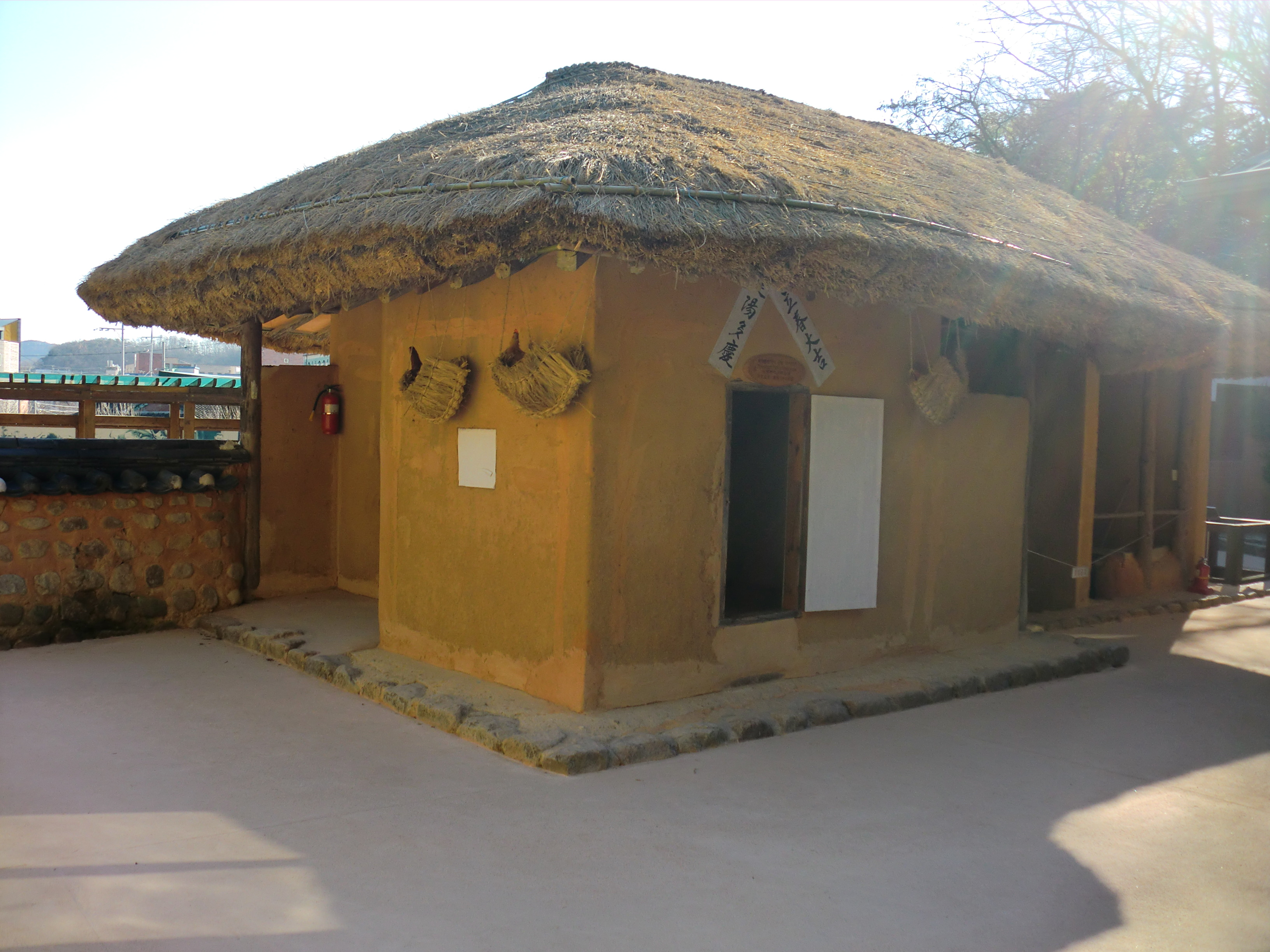
Part of Park's childhood home. Park was born in the sarangchae depicted here. He slept and studied here (except while away in secondary school) until 1937.

Park was born around 11:00 AM on November 14, 1917, in Sangmo-dong, Gumi, Korea, Empire of Japan to father Pak Sŏngbin and mother Paek Namŭi. He was the youngest of five brothers and two sisters. He was of the Goryeong Park clan.

Park's family was extremely poor and consistently lacked food. According to Park, his father was upper-class (yangban) and set to inherit the family's moderate holdings, but the clan banished him after he participated in the 1894–1895 Tonghak Peasant Revolution. (Note: Park's paternal grandfather, Park Yŏng-kyu (박영규; 1840–1914), had inherited enough land to feed the family and hoped to support Park's father in taking the gwageo: the civil service examinations that determined placement in high-level government jobs. Instead, Park's father passed the less-prestigious mugwa, the military examinations. He was considered a persuasive talker; after participating in the rebellion, he talked his way out of being executed. He was apparently the only survivor from among 300 tried.) In 1916, the elder Park moved to his wife's village of Sangmo-dong, where he was given a small plot of land. According to later interviews, he did not work the land with his wife and instead drank alcohol and wandered around. Biographer of Park Chong-Sik Lee speculates that the elder Park did not wish to be seen working to avoid showing acceptance of his lost yangban status.

Park's mother was seen by her contemporaries as diligent and focused. She managed both the household and farming. She was around 43 at the time of Park's birth. Due to her advanced age and disastrous economic situation, she tried to abort the pregnancy on a number of occasions. When her son was eventually born, however, she was reportedly deeply affectionate toward him. (Note: She gave birth to Park alone, as the rest of the family was outside of the home at the time. She cut the umbilical cord herself.)

Park had a number of health concerns in his youth. For much of his early life, he did not eat well and was often described as sickly. When he was two years old, he crawled off a raised floor and landed in a smouldering fire pit. He was quickly rescued from the pit, but his forearms were significantly burned. For the rest of his life, he reportedly intentionally wore shirts with long sleeves to hide his scars.

A significant biographer of Park, Cho Gab-je, interviewed many people who knew him and got the impression that Park's childhood was otherwise fairly happy. According to Cho, Park had many close friends, his parents got along well, and his family was affectionate toward him.

=== Elementary school ===
Park was the second person in his family, after his older brother Park Sang Hee, to attend elementary school. He enrolled on April 1, 1927, at age 9 and eventually graduated on March 25, 1932. His school, Gumi Elementary School, was 6 kilometers (3.7 mi) (Note: Park claims in his autobiography that the path was 8 km long, but if the reconstructed path is measured today, it is around 6 km.) away from his home. The long daily walk and his hunger took a toll on his body. Park wrote of this in his memoirs: (Note: 오전에 네 시간 수업을 했으니까 학교수업 개시가 8시라고 기억한다... 시간이 좀 늦다고 생각하면 구보로 20리 길을 거의 뛰어야 했다... 학교에 가지고 간 도시락이 겨울에는 얼어서 찬밥을 먹으면 나는 흔히 체해서 가끔은 음식을 토하기도 하고 체하면 때로는 아침밥을 먹지 않고 가기도 했다... 며칠 동안 밥을 먹지 못하면 이웃집의 침장이 할아버지가 있었는데 거기에 가서 침을 맞았다.)

[Class started at 8 a.m...] If I suspected I was late, (Note: Nobody in his village had access to a clock.) I'd run the [6 km] to school... During the winter, food in my school lunch box would freeze. If I ate it anyway, my stomach would become upset, and I'd sometimes vomit. During these times, I'd sometimes go [without eating for days]...

— Park Chung Hee, My Boyhood (1970)

Park was consistently among the shortest students at each school he attended, (Note: Park's father reportedly had a large frame.) and was often described as sickly in his school records. In sixth grade, he was 135.8 cm (4 ft 5 1/2 in) tall and weighed 30 kg (66 lb). In spite of his physical challenges, he was a diligent student who got good grades. Park was made class leader for several years; his classmates later recalled that he could be overbearing in enforcing discipline, even slapping a number of them.

On Sundays, Park attended a seodang (traditional school), where he received an education in the Confucian classics. Also around this time, he attended the Presbyterian Sangmo Church in Gumi. His family teased him for this, as they did not attend church, though he stopped at the end of elementary school. Decades later, he donated money to repair the church after it was damaged during the Korean War.

People who knew Park as a child described him as competitive and persistent. His classmates later recalled that even after he lost in competitions of strength, such as arm wrestling or ssireum (Korean wrestling), he would taunt his opponents and demand rematches until he won.

Park's friends remembered him as a voracious reader of history, who frequently talked excitedly about his historical heroes. When he was around 13, Park became an admirer of the French leader Napoleon. Around this time, he also came to idolize the famed Korean Admiral Yi Sun-sin (who fought the Japanese during the Imjin War and was both respected by his contemporary Japanese commanders and revered by Imperial Japanese officers). Park read a biography about the admiral written by Yi Gwangsu which moved him deeply. According to historian Chong-Sik Lee, a significant part of the biography is disparaging toward politicians and even Koreans in general, as the competent admiral was treated poorly by these groups during his lifetime. Lee speculated that this later influenced Park's authoritarian leadership style. (Note: These feelings may have been further reinforced by one of Park's teachers at Taegu Normal School, Kim Yŏnggi (김영기). Popular with the Korean students, Kim was an ardent Korean nationalist who vocally disparaged the former Korean kingdoms and criticized Korean culture.)

=== Taegu Normal School ===
In 1932, Park was admitted to Taegu Normal School, a secondary school that trained elementary school teachers. Admissions were highly competitive, as it was the third such school in Korea, tuition was free, and teaching positions were historically seen as prestigious. Park was accepted from among 1,070 applicants into a class of 10 Japanese and 90 Korean students; he was ranked 50th at time of admission.

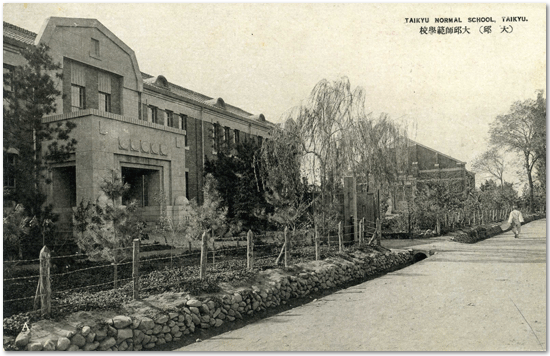
Taegu Normal School in the 1930s

Despite the prestige and free tuition, his mother had hoped that he would not be accepted. The living expenses his education incurred (at a time when currency was scarce and bartering was the norm), as well as the loss of his help on the farm, created a significant burden for the family. According to Lee, Park's family was about to go through their worst economic struggles yet. Around this time, Asia was experiencing the effects of the Great Depression and Japanese colonial policies mandated that Koreans send to Japan a significant portion of their agricultural output for what was seen as inadequate compensation.

Park's schooling at Taegu was militaristic, especially as Japanese military officers were involved in running it. In fall, the entire school participated in enshū (演習)—military training programs. According to Lee, Park enjoyed and excelled in these aspects of the school. He took up kendo and became a trumpeter. His enthusiasm caught the eye of Lt. Col. Arikawa Keiichi (有川圭一; 1891–1945) of the Kwantung Army, who ran the military training programs and became fond of Park.

Park became interested in quitting teaching and joining the military. But to his contemporaries, his chances seemed slim; (Note: According to classmate and friend Kim Pyŏnghŭi (김병희; 金昞熙), one day Park expressed interest in joining the military, and Kim skeptically teased his ambition. Twenty-five years later, they reminisced about the conversation after Park became the military dictator of South Korea.) entrance into the Japanese Military Academy was highly competitive for Koreans, and Park's grades were plummeting. In 1935, he was ranked last among the 73 students in his class and missed more days of school each year. Park's teachers attributed this to his dire economic situation. Lee theorizes that the absences were caused by his parents' inability to gather enough money for his expenses at the school in time, which caused him to miss the first several weeks of each term. In addition, Park's older brother Sang Hee lost his job (and two children to disease) in 1935, making him unable to assist the rest of the family.

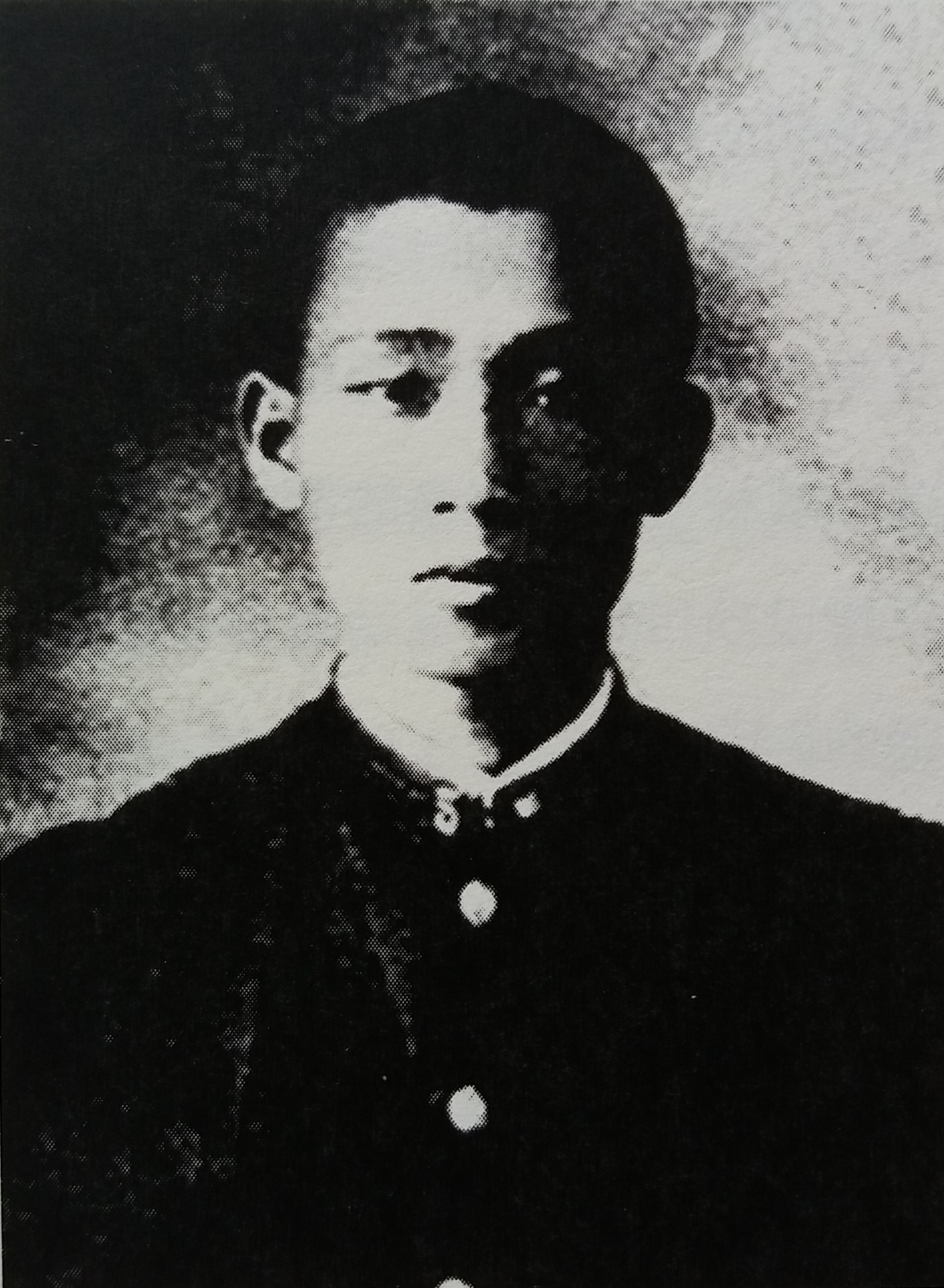
Park's graduation photo from Taegu Normal School in 1937

By contrast, many of Park's classmates came from financially comfortable families. Several of them recalled that Park felt humiliated by his situation. When they pooled their money to buy snacks, Park would excuse himself and sulk alone. One classmate recalled finding Park in tears one evening. He was being sent home to collect money for his living expenses, despite knowing that his family would not have it. Lee speculates that Park became more pragmatic and calculating during this time, as they were traits that were needed for not only staying enrolled, but also to avoid starving.

==== First marriage ====
In 1934, Park began secretly (Note: Because it was against school policy for students to be in relationships.) dating Yi Chŏngok (이정옥), who was attending a girls school in the same city. Park's father wished to see Park married as soon as possible, and not knowing about his son's relationship, arranged a marriage to a different woman: Kim Ho-nam. The two married in 1935 while Park was still in love with Yi. While the marriage produced a daughter, Park Jae-ok, Kim was reportedly appalled at the family's poverty, and the couple avoided each other as much as possible. After their marriage, Park had a year left to go at school, so he left her at the Park household and returned.

== Teaching ==
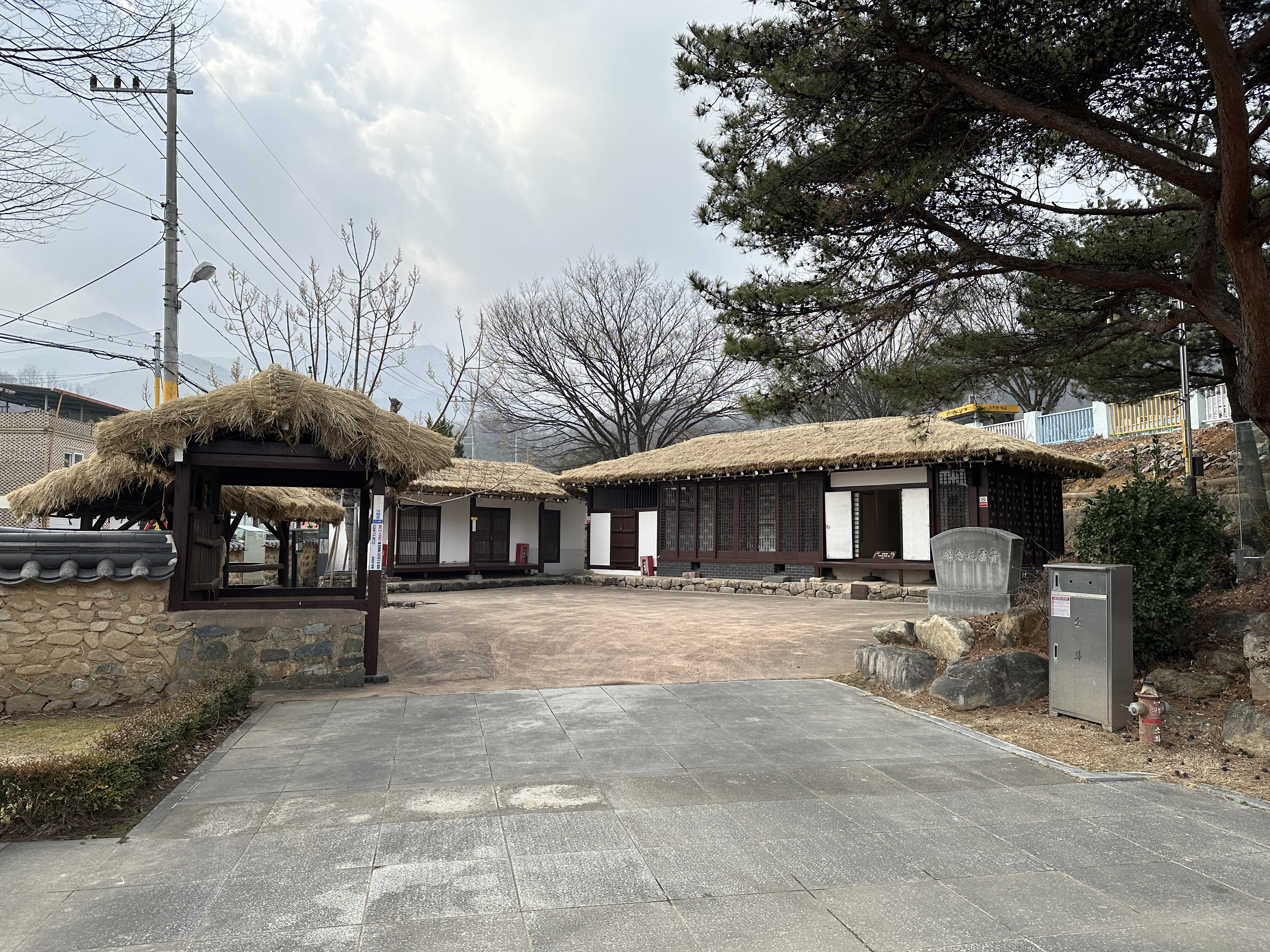
Cheongungak, the house where Park stayed while living in Mungyeong. (2024)

On March 20, 1937, Park graduated from Taegu, ranked 69 out of 70 in his class. (Note: Park and other students with poor grades were allowed to graduate likely because there was a significant need for teachers. Most of the students that did not graduate were not kicked out because of their grades, but instead because they had been caught reading socialist literature.) As part of the conditions of his schooling, he was required to teach for at least two years, and was placed in the Mungyeong Public Normal School. The school was in Mungyeong, then an isolated coal mining town. He finally began receiving a comfortable salary, which he sent part of to his family. But just as he had once done, his students walked to the school daily often from far away and struggled to afford meals. He offered assistance to several of them in order to have them keep coming to the school. While Park was remembered by his students as a caring and enthusiastic teacher, Lee speculates that, in such a small town, Park was lonely and understimulated. He and his roommate reportedly drank large amounts of makgeolli—Korean rice wine—to pass the time.

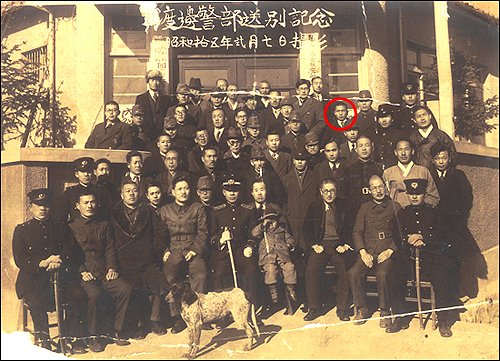
Park (circled) as a teacher (1940)

Shortly after Park began teaching, Japan launched the Second Sino-Japanese War, and began making significant victories in quick succession. Park was inspired by the success of the Japanese. He even wrote a stageplay that his students acted out, entitled [The Korean] Volunteer Soldiers Go to War (『지원병출정』). The play reflected contemporary events, as around February 1938, the colonial government had instituted the Special Volunteer Enlistment System. Thousands of Korean youths applied, although whether most applied willingly, or even just for the salary and benefits, is a subject of academic debate. (Note: Some scholars argue that local officials, in an effort to make their districts seem more patriotic, pressured locals into applying. There were several reasons that service could have been appealing, however. Most of the applicants were from poor sharecropping families who likely would have appreciated the military salary and benefits. Military service also improved their social status; in Korea, Koreans were at the bottom of the social ladder, but in Manchuria, they were above the Chinese majority. Abuses committed by Koreans in Manchuria have since contributed to anti-Korean sentiment in China.) However, the Japanese military was wary of accepting Koreans due to concerns over their loyalty, and thus only accepted a fraction of the applicants each year. If a Korean could demonstrate unshakable patriotism, they were considered to have a better chance of being accepted.

=== Applying for military school and blood oath ===
In 1938, Park applied to join the Manchukuo Army Military Academy, which was to open the following year. However, he was three years over the maximum age limit of 19 for candidates; (Note: His age was not the only issue; applicants were also required to be unmarried. However, it's likely that Park concealed his marital status.) he wrote a request for the admissions office to overlook his age, but was rejected. Park sought out Kang Chaeho, an ethnic Korean captain in the Manchukuo Army and a native of Taegu, for advice. Kang offered to use his connections to try and get an exception for Park. He also advised Park to swear a blood oath (혈서; 血書; hyŏlsŏ) in order to demonstrate his fealty to Japan and draw publicity for his cause.

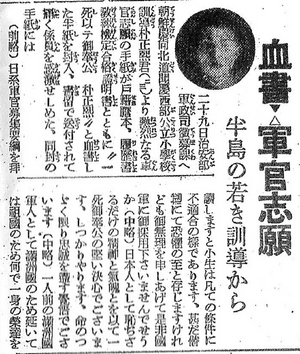
Article in the Manshū Shimbun on Park's blood oath. (March 31, 1939)

On March 31, 1939, the Manchukuo newspaper Manshū Shimbun ran an article called "Blood Oath: Desire to be an Army Officer: Young Teacher from the Peninsula".

On the 29th, admissions officers of the Military Government command were deeply moved by a piece of registered mail from Park Chung Hee, a teacher at Western Mungyeong Public School in North Gyeongsang Province, Korea. Included in the mail was a passionate letter that expressed Park's desire to be an army officer, as well as an oath written in blood that read "Service Until Death" (一死以テ御奉公)... Becoming an officer, however, is limited to those already in the army; being 23 years old, he exceeded the age limit of 19. Therefore and regretfully, his application was politely rejected.

==== Acceptance and controversy ====
In spite of this second rejection, Park was somehow eventually accepted to the academy. The circumstances surrounding his acceptance are not known with certainty, and are a source of controversy. The leading theory is that Arikawa, then a colonel in the Kwantung Army, personally asked the commandant of the academy Major General Nagumo to let Park in.

Another theory, proposed by the Korean Chinese historian Ryu Yŏnsan (류연산) in 2003, posits that Park may have joined the Gando Special Force as another show of fealty. The unit was meant to suppress Korean independence activism in the Jiandao region ("Gando" in Korean, "Kantō" in Japanese) of Northeast China. (Note: Ryu based this theory on an account from an ethnic Korean in China who allegedly served under Park in the unit. Jiandao was a hotbed for militant resistance against the Japanese Empire, with famous fighters like Kim Il Sung and Hong Beom-do having operated there. Park is already controversial in contemporary South Korea for collaborating with the Japanese Empire; the idea that he voluntarily suppressed Korean freedom fighters would make him even more controversial. What followed was a series of lawsuits that alleged defamation, including several from Park's daughter Park Geun Ryeong, who sued Ryu and several publishers of Ryu's works. This sparked a debate over academic freedom and free speech. Over a hundred scholars published a letter in protest of the lawsuits, in which they argued Park had been a public figure and not just a private citizen, so he should be discussed publicly.) However, this theory is rejected by biographers Cho Gab-je and Chong-Sik Lee, who argue that the testimony which the theory is based on does not align with the chronology of widely accepted events in Park's life.

== Military career ==
Park with fellow students at Changchun Military Academy

=== Manchukuo Army Military Academy ===
The schooling environment at the Manchukuo Academy was tense, in part due to its significant ethnic, linguistic, and political diversity. Its student body was composed of around 10 Korean, 223 Chinese, and 107 Japanese people. According to Chong-sik Lee, Park excelled at the academy, (Note: Lee notes that none of Park's records at the academy are known to exist to confirm this, however.) especially in comparison to the non-Japanese students. He was fluent in Japanese, comparatively well-educated, and already accustomed to military drills and regimented dormitory life from his time at Taegu Normal School. He adopted and went by the Japanese name Takagi Masao (高木正雄). (Note: Lee theorized that Park deliberately chose a given name and surname that had "no trace of Korean in it". While it was common for Koreans to choose Japanese-sounding surnames, notably under the sōshi-kaimei policies, they often kept their given names and read them with a Japanese pronunciation. If he had done this, Park's name would probably have been read "Takagi Seiki" (高木正熙).)

Park was made to assist other students. Several of his Chinese and Korean classmates later described him as arrogant, and recalled that other students picked fights with him. In spite of this, according to Lee, Park remembered his time at the academy fondly. At a state dinner in Tokyo in November 1961, Park made a point to find and thank General Nagumo Shinichirō (南雲慎一郎), the former commandant of the academy, for his time there. Nagumo revealed that Park had been sending him gifts of ginseng.

At the time, Manchukuo was seen as a haven for Japanese political extremists of both the left and right, and the academy similarly had instructors who were then and later associated with significant controversy. According to one account, a Captain Kanno Hiroshi had previously partaken in the failed February 26 incident coup in Japan, and taught an analysis of the coup that Park possibly heeded. Lee evaluated this account as convincing, and theorized that, years later, Park applied the lessons to his own coup. (Note: Lee noted that both coups had similar justifications provided. The February 26 coup accused the zaibatsu corporations of wielding unfair political influence, with Park's coup doing the same with the chaebol.)

In March 1942, Park graduated among the top five students of the academy. (Note: At the ceremony, he received an award and gold watch from Manchukuo Emperor Puyi.) After graduation, he took a three-month apprenticeship in the Kwantung Army's 30th Infantry Regiment in Harbin as a liaison. (Note: According to Lee, Park was disappointed with what he observed. Many of the Chinese soldiers had been pressed into service, were undisciplined, and often poor and illiterate.)

=== Japanese Military Academy ===
His talents as an officer were swiftly recognized and he was one of the few Koreans allowed to attend the Imperial Japanese Army Academy near Tokyo. He was subsequently posted to a Japanese Army regiment in Manchuria and served there until Japan's surrender at the end of World War II.

=== In Manchukuo ===
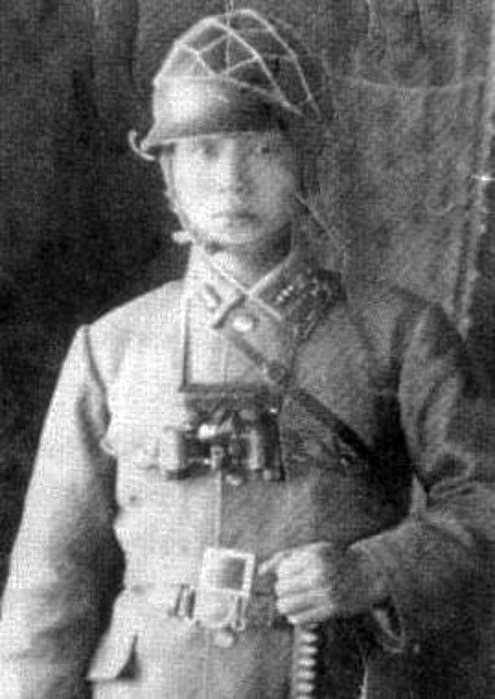
Park as a soldier of the Manchukuo Imperial Army

After graduating fifth in the class of 1944, Park was commissioned as a lieutenant into the Manchukuo Imperial Army, the army of the Japanese puppet state of Manchukuo, and served during the final stages of World War II as aide-de-camp to a regimental commander.

After the Soviet invasion of Manchuria and the surrender of Japan, in September 1945 Park and several other Korean officers in the 8th Division of the Manchukuo army traveled to Beijing. The Korean Liberation Army of the Provisional Government of the Republic of Korea was being assembled there, and its leader at the time, Choi Yong-duk, accepted many Korean officers who had been in Japanese or Manchurian service. The army traveled to Korea in April 1946, but it was disbanded by the United States Army Military Government in Korea, at which point Park returned to his home province.

=== Return to Korea ===
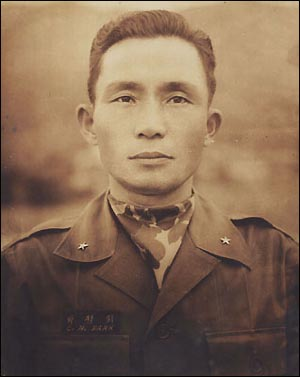
Park as a South Korean brigadier general in 1957

Park returned to Korea after the war and enrolled at the Korea Military Academy. He graduated in the second class of 1946 (one of his classmates was Kim Jae-gyu, his close friend and later assassin) and became an officer in the constabulary army under the United States Army Military Government in South Korea. The newly established South Korean government, under the leadership of Syngman Rhee, arrested Park in November 1948 on charges that he led a Communist cell in the Korean constabulary. Park was subsequently sentenced to death by a military court, but his sentence was commuted by Rhee at the urging of several high-ranking Korean military officers.

While Park had been a member of the Workers' Party of South Korea, the allegations concerning his involvement in a communist cell were never substantiated. After his older brother Park Sung-hui was killed by police during the communist-led riots in Daegu in 1946, Park sided with the political left whom he considered was better organized, more patriotic and less corrupt than the political right. In 1948, he led a communist cell in the army and was initially sentenced to death due to his role in a revolt by junior officers, but he was then commuted to 15 years and later pardoned due to his cooperation with investigators. Nevertheless, he was forced out of the army. While working in the Army as an unpaid civilian assistant, he came across the 8th class of the Korea Military Academy (graduated in 1950), among whom was Kim Jong-pil, and this particular class would later serve as the backbone of the May 16 coup. Right after the Korean War began and with help from Paik Sun-Yup, Park returned to active service as a major in the South Korean Army.

He was promoted to lieutenant colonel in September 1950 and to colonel in April 1951. As a colonel, Park was the deputy director of the Army Headquarters Intelligence Bureau in 1952 before switching to artillery and commanded the II and III Artillery Corps during the war. By the time the war ended in 1953, Park had risen to become a brigadier general. After the signing of the Korean Armistice Agreement, Park was selected for six months' training at Fort Sill in the United States.

After returning to Korea, Park rose rapidly in the military hierarchy. He was the head of the Army's Artillery School and commanded the 5th and 7th Divisions of the South Korean army before his promotion to major general in 1958. Park was then appointed Chief of Staff of the First Army and made the head of the Korean 1st and 6th District Command, which gave him responsibility for the defense of Seoul. In 1960, Park became commander of the Pusan Logistics Command before becoming Chief of the Operations Staff of the South Korean Army and the deputy commander of the Second Army. As such, he was one of the most powerful and influential figures in the military.

== Rise to power ==
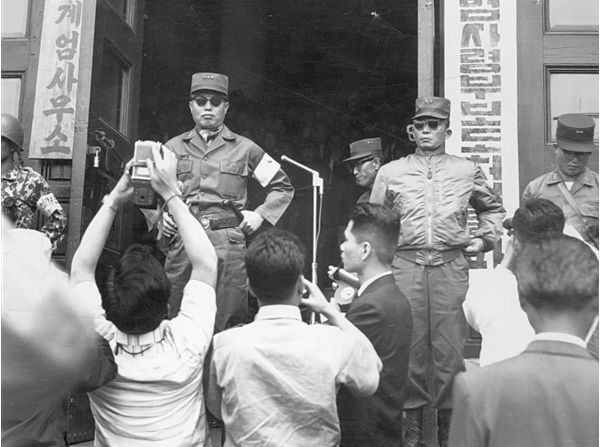
The leaders of the Military Revolutionary Committee pictured on May 20, four days after the coup: chairman Chang Do-yong (left) and vice-chairman Park Chung Hee (right)

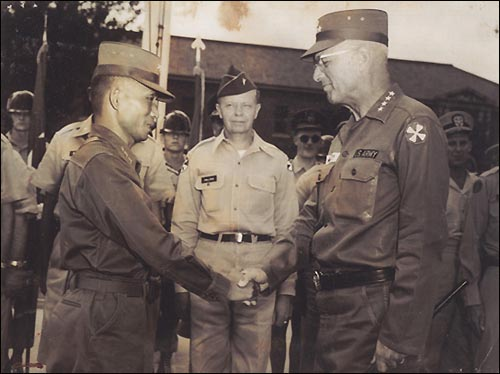
Park Chung Hee shook hands with General Guy S. Meloy Jr. during his visit to the United Nations Command in 1961

On April 26, 1960, Syngman Rhee, the authoritarian inaugural President of South Korea, was forced out of office and into exile following the April Revolution, a student-led uprising. Yun Po-sun was elected as president later that year on July 29, although the real power was held by Prime Minister Chang Myon. Problems arose immediately because neither man could command loyalty from any majority of the Democratic Party or reach agreement on the composition of the cabinet. Prime Minister Chang attempted to hold the tenuous coalition together by reshuffling cabinet positions three times within five months.

Meanwhile, the new government was caught between an economy that was suffering from a decade of mismanagement and corruption under the Rhee presidency and the students who had instigated Rhee's ousting. Protesters regularly filled the streets making numerous and wide-ranging demands for political and economic reforms. Public security had deteriorated while the public had distrusted the police, which was long under the control of the Rhee government, and the ruling Democratic Party lost public support after long factional fighting.

Against this backdrop of social instability and division, Park formed the Military Revolutionary Committee. When he found out that he was going to be retired within the next few months, he sped up the committee's plans. It led a military coup on May 16, 1961, which was nominally led by Army Chief of Staff Chang Do-yong after his defection on the day it started. On May 18, Chang Myon announced his resignation along with his cabinet. Yun accepted the coup and persuaded the United States Eighth Army and the commanders of various ROK army units not to interfere with the new government. U.S. President John F. Kennedy reluctantly accepted the coup to preserve the military alliance and prevent further instability.

Initially, a new administration was formed from among those military officers who supported Park. The reformist military Supreme Council for National Reconstruction was nominally led by General Chang. Following Chang's arrest in July 1961, Park took overall control of the council. The coup was largely welcomed by a general populace exhausted by political chaos, although condemned in certain quarters.

Soon after the coup, Park was promoted to Lieutenant general. The South Korean historian Hwang Moon Kyung described Park's rule as very "militaristic", noting right from the start Park aimed to mobilize South Korean society along "militaristically disciplined lines". One of Park's very first acts upon coming to power was a campaign to "clean up" the streets by arresting and putting the homeless to work in "welfare centers".

The American historian Carter Eckert wrote that the historiography, including his work, around Park has tended to ignore the "enormous elephant in the room" namely that the way in which Park sought kündaehwa (modernization) of South Korea was influenced by his distinctively militaristic way of understanding the world, and the degree in which the Japanophile Park was influenced by Japanese militarism as he created what South Korean historians call a "developmental dictatorship". Eckert called South Korea under Park's leadership one of the most militarized states in the entire world, writing that Park sought to militarize South Korean society in a way that no other South Korean leader has ever attempted.

In the Imperial Japanese Army, there was the belief that bushido would give Japanese soldiers enough "warrior spirit" to make them invincible in battle, as the Japanese regarded war as simply a matter of willpower with the side with the stronger will always prevailing. Reflecting his background as a man trained by Japanese officers, one of Park's favorite sayings was "we can do anything if we try" as Park argued that all problems could be overcome by sheer willpower. Eckert wrote when interviewing Park's closest friends, he always received the same answer when he asked them what was the important influence on Park, namely his officer training by the Japanese in Manchukuo. All of Park's friends told Eckert that to understand him, one needed to understand his Ilbonsik sagwan kyoyuk (Japanese officer training) as they all maintained Park's values were those of an Imperial Japanese Army officer.

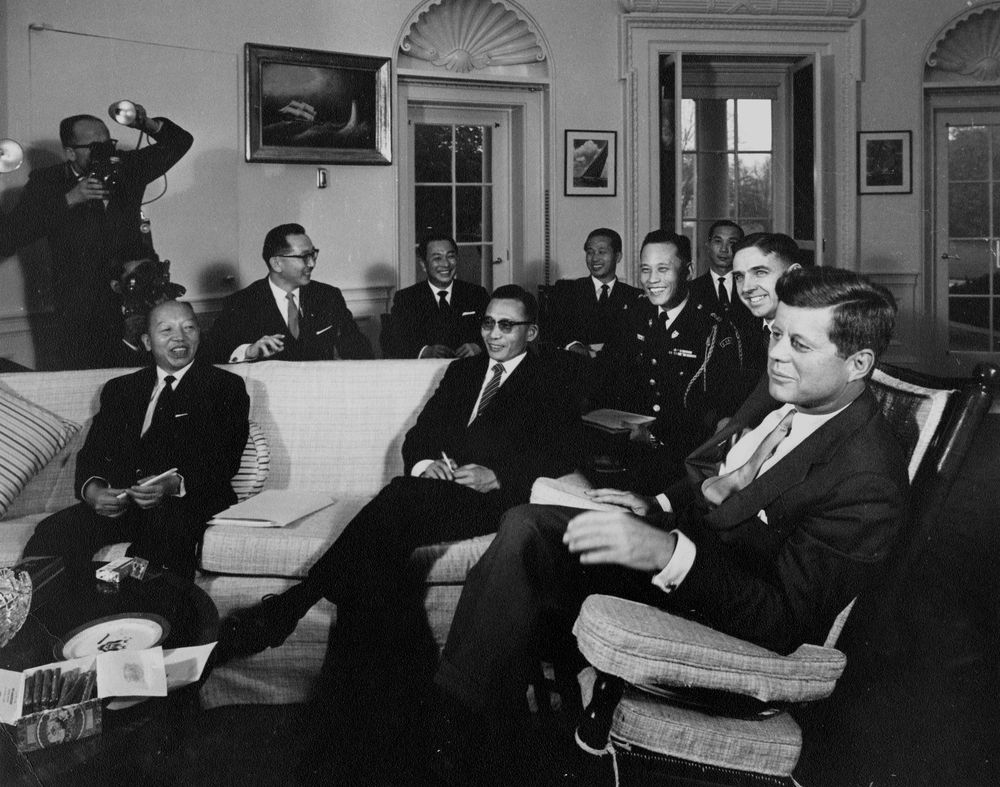
Park with U.S. President John F. Kennedy in Washington, D.C., on November 14, 1961

On June 19, 1961, the military council created the Korean Central Intelligence Agency in order to prevent counter-coups and suppress potential enemies, both foreign and domestic. Along with being given investigative powers, the KCIA was also given the authority to arrest and detain anyone suspected of wrongdoing or having anti-government sentiments. Under its first director, retired Brigadier general Kim Jong-pil, a relative of Park and one of the original planners of the coup, the KCIA would extend its power to economic and foreign affairs.

President Yun remained in office, giving the military regime legitimacy. After Yun resigned on March 24, 1962, Park, who remained chairman of the Supreme Council for National Reconstruction, consolidated his power by becoming acting president; he was also promoted to full general. Park agreed to restore civilian rule following pressure from the Kennedy administration.

In 1963, he was elected president in his own right as the candidate of the newly created Democratic Republican Party. He appointed Park Myung-keun, the Vice Leader of the party as the chief of the President's Office. He narrowly defeated former President Yun, the candidate of the Civil Rule Party, by just over 156,000 votes—a margin of 1.5 percent. Park would be re-elected president in 1967, defeating Yun with somewhat less difficulty.

== Presidency (1963–1979) ==
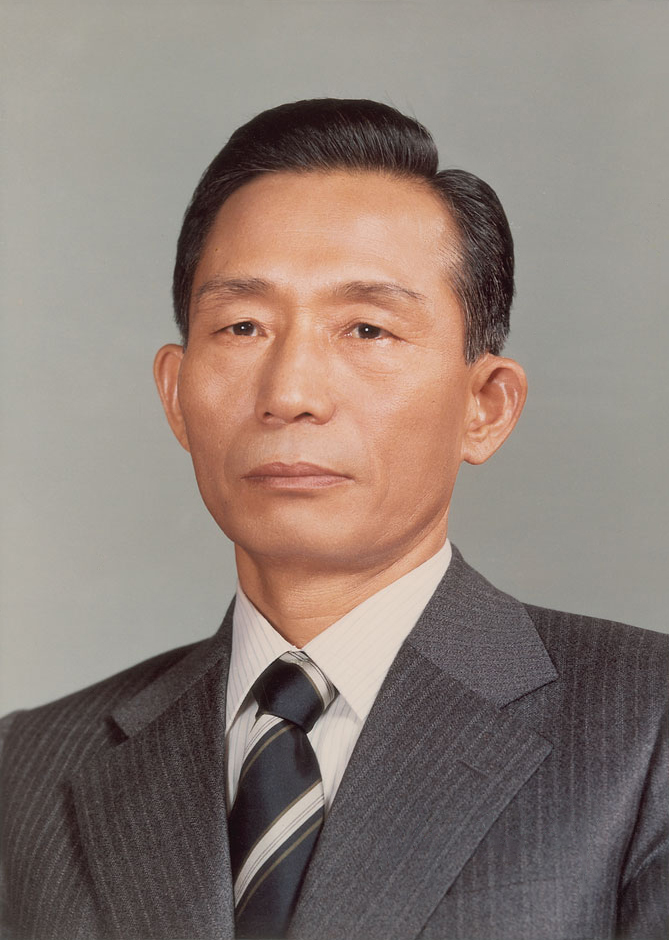
- Presidency of Park Chung Hee; December 17, 1963 – October 26, 1979 (Assassination)
- Prime Minister: Himself; Kim Hyun-chul; Choi Tu-son; Chung Il-kwon; Paik Too-chin; Kim Jong-pil; Choi Kyu-hah
- Cabinet: See list
- Party: Democratic Republican
- Seat: Seoul
- First term December 17, 1963 – November 21, 1972
- Election: 1963, 1967, 1971
- Constituency: Third Republic
- Second term November 21, 1972 – October 26, 1979
- Election: 1972, 1978
- Constituency: Fourth Republic

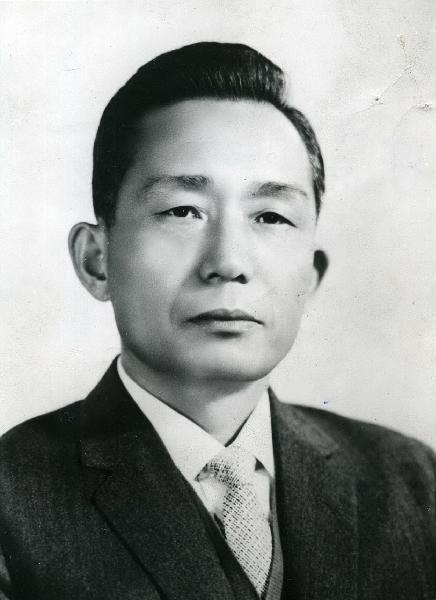
Official portrait, 1963

=== Foreign policy ===
In June 1965, Park signed a treaty normalizing relations with Japan, which included payment of reparations and the making of soft-loans from Japan, and led to increased trade and investment between South Korea and Japan. In July 1966, South Korea and the United States signed a Status of Forces Agreement, establishing a more equal relationship between the two countries. With its growing economic strength and the security guarantee of the United States, the threat of a conventional invasion from North Korea seemed increasingly remote. Despite the South Korean government's heavy reliance on American support, Park made an effort to not fully attach his foreign policy agendas to their US counterpart. However, following the escalation of the Vietnam War with the US deploying ground combat troops in March 1965, South Korea sent the Capital Division and the 2nd Marine Brigade to South Vietnam in September 1965, followed by the White Horse Division in September 1966.

==== United States ====
Park Chung-hee's relations with the U.S. were complex and highly transactional, defined by a mutual, though often strained, anti-communist alliance. While heavily reliant on U.S. military protection and economic aid, Park frequently clashed with Washington over his authoritarian rule, his secret nuclear ambitions and discussions over proposed U.S. troop withdrawals. Presidents Richard Nixon, Gerald Ford and Jimmy Carter all pressured Park to end his authoritarian Yushin regime, which severely strained bilateral relations. Alarmed by the Nixon Doctrine (which proposed reduced U.S. troop presence on the peninsula) and the fall of South Vietnam, Park secretly pursued a nuclear weapons program in the 1970s until the U.S. strongly intervened and forced South Korea to abandon these ambitions. Carter's proposal to withdraw U.S. ground forces caused major panic in South Korea, as Park's government actively resisted the move, even going as far as funneling millions of dollars in bribes to members of the U.S. Congress in a political scandal known as Koreagate, with the goal of securing American military aid and preventing Carter from withdrawing U.S. troops unilaterally.

==== Vietnam War ====
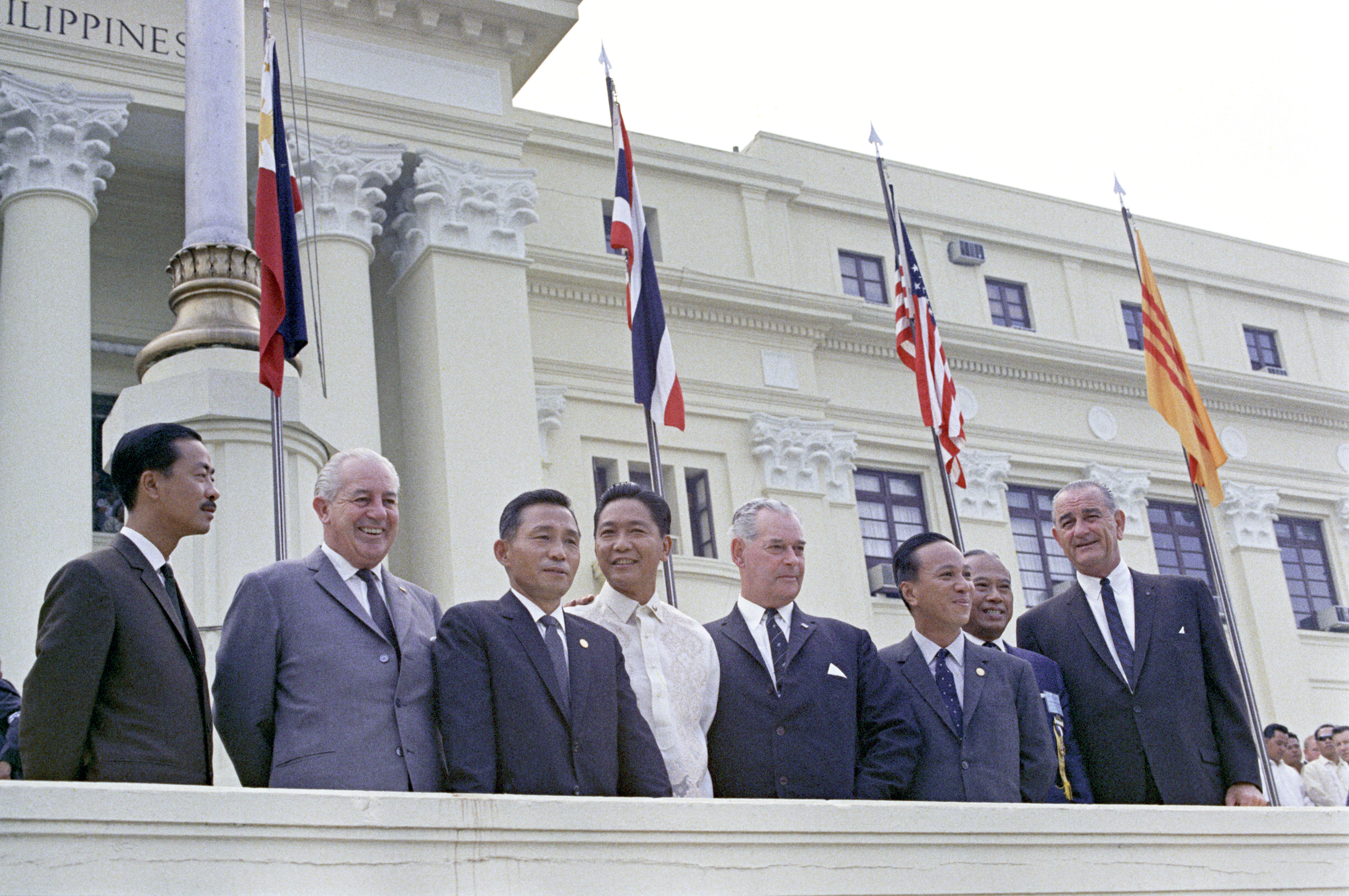
Park (third left) at the 1966 Manila Summit Conference

At the request of the United States, Park sent approximately 320,000 South Korean troops to fight alongside the United States and South Vietnam during the Vietnam War; a commitment second only to that of the United States. The stated reasons for this were to help maintain good relations with the United States, prevent the further advance of communism in East Asia and to enhance the Republic's international standing. In January 1965, on the day when a bill mandating a major deployment passed the National Assembly (with 106 votes for and 11 against), Park announced that it was "time for South Korea to wean itself from a passive position of receiving help or suffering intervention, and to assume a proactive role of taking responsibility on major international issues." South Korean soldiers were not able to ultimately defeat the Viet Cong, even though South Korea was quite successful. They also gained a reputation for brutality towards civilians and were accused of numerous "My Lai-style" massacres.

Although primarily to strengthen the military alliance with the United States, there were also financial incentives for South Korea's participation in the war. South Korean military personnel were paid by the United States federal government and their salaries were remitted directly to the South Korean government. Park was eager to send South Korean troops to Vietnam and vigorously campaigned to extend the war. In return for troop commitments, South Korea received tens of billions of dollars in grants, loans, subsidies, technology transfers, and preferential markets, all provided by the Johnson and Nixon administrations.

==== North Korea ====
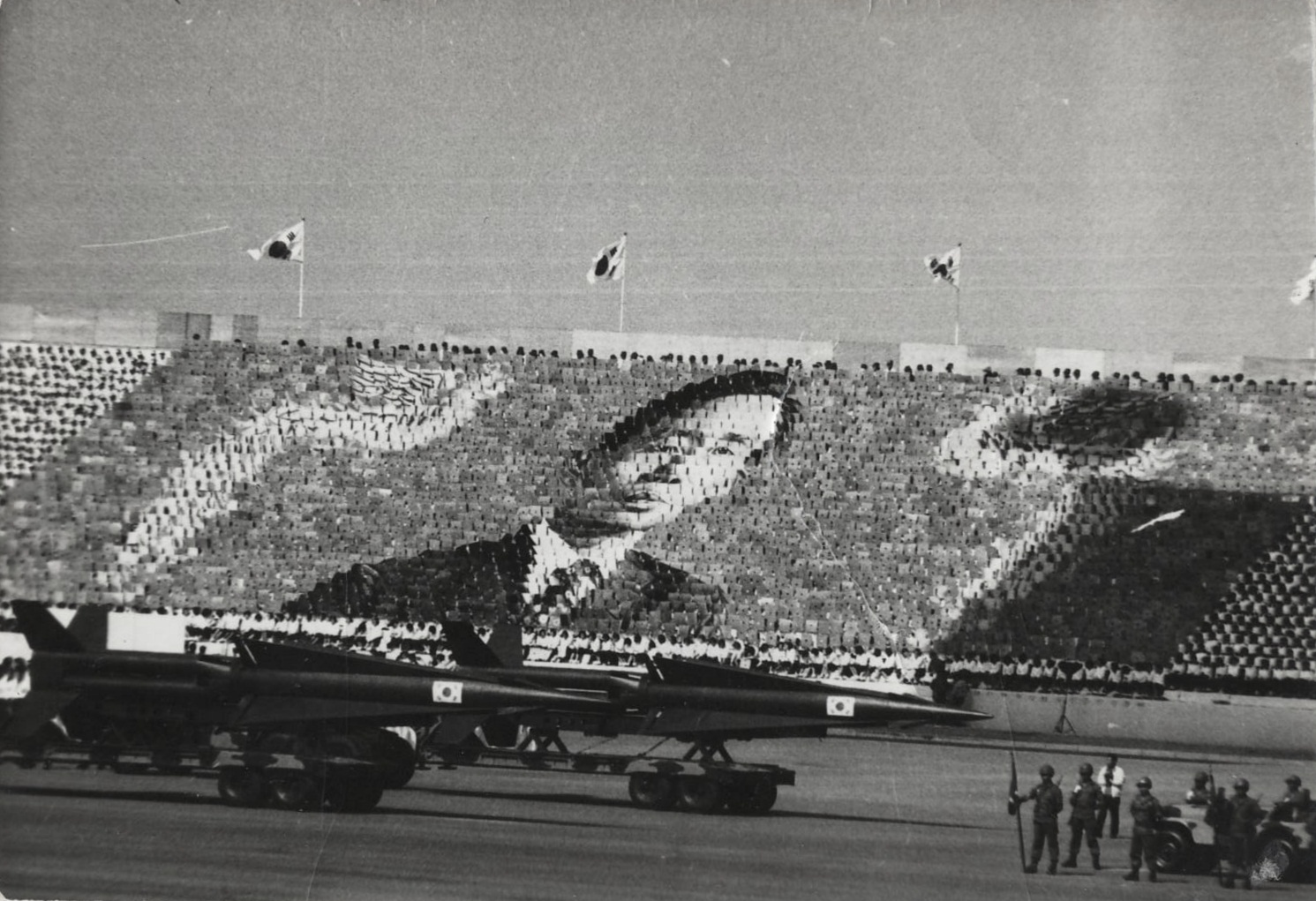
Honoring President Park Chung Hee in Army Parade at Armed Forces Day on October 1, 1973

Park oversaw transitional changes between the two Koreas from conflict to consolidation. In 1961, the North Korean leader, Kim Il Sung secretly sent Hwang Tae-song, a former friend of Park Chung Hee and a vice-minister in ministry of trade, to South Korea, hoping to improve inter-Korean relations. However, in order to dissipate the suspicions about his Communist leanings and assure Americans his firm stance as an ally, Park decided to execute Hwang as a spy.

Beginning in October 1964, North Korea increased the infiltration of its intelligence-gatherers and propagandists into the South. More than 30 South Korean soldiers and at least 10 civilians had been killed in clashes with North Korean infiltrators by October 1966.

In October 1966, Park ordered the Korean Army to stage a retaliatory attack without seeking the approval of General Charles Bonesteel. This action, which was in retaliation for ongoing South Korean losses, caused tension between Park's government and the U.S. command in Korea, which wished not to violate the armistice.

Between 1966 and 1969 the clashes escalated as Park's armed forces were involved in firefights along the Korean DMZ. The fighting, sometimes referred to as the Second Korean War, was related to a speech given by Kim Il Sung on October 5, 1966, in which the North Korean leader challenged the legitimacy of the 1953 Armistice Agreement. Kim stated that irregular warfare could now succeed in a way conventional warfare could not because the South Korean military was now involved with the ever-growing Vietnam War. He believed Park's administration could be undermined if armed provocation by North Korea was directed against U.S. troops. This would force United States to reconsider its worldwide commitments. Any splits would give the North an opportunity to incite an insurgency in the South against Park.

On January 21, 1968, the 31-man Unit 124 of North Korean People's Army special forces commandos attempted to assassinate Park and nearly succeeded. They were stopped just 800 metres from the Blue House by a police patrol. A fire fight broke out and all but two of the North Koreans were killed or captured. In response to the assassination attempt, Park organized Unit 684, a group intended to assassinate Kim Il Sung. The plan was called off in 1971 and the unit subsequently mutinied, resulting in a firefight in Seoul in which most of the members of the unit were killed.

Despite the hostility, negotiations were conducted between the North and South regarding reunification. On July 4, 1972, both countries released a joint statement specifying that reunification must be achieved internally with no reliance on external forces or outside interference, that the process must be achieved peacefully without the use of military force, and that all parties must promote national unity as a united people over any differences of ideological and political systems. The United States Department of State was not happy with these proposals and, following Park's assassination in 1979, they were quietly buried.

On August 15, 1974, Park was delivering a speech in the National Theater in Seoul at the ceremony to celebrate the 29th anniversary of the ending of colonial rule when a man named Mun Se-gwang fired a gun at Park from the front row. The would-be assassin, who was a Japanese-born North Korean sympathizer, missed Park but a stray bullet struck his wife Yuk Young-soo (who died later that day) and others on the stage. Park continued his speech as his dying wife was carried off the stage. Mun was hanged in a Seoul prison four months later. On the first anniversary of his wife's death, Park wrote in his diary "I felt as though I had lost everything in the world. All things became a burden and I lost my courage and will. A year has passed since then. And during that year I have cried alone in secret too many times to count."

==== Japan ====
On June 22, 1965, the Park administration and the government of Japan under Eisaku Satō signed the Treaty on Basic Relations Between Japan and the Republic of Korea, which normalized relations between Japan and South Korea for the first time. Relations with Japan had previously not been officially established since Korea's decolonization and division at the end of World War II.

In January 2005, the South Korean government uncovered 1,200 pages of diplomatic documents of the Treaty on Basic Relations between Japan and the Republic of Korea of 1965 that had been kept secret for forty years. These documents revealed that the Japanese government proposed to the government of South Korea, then headed by Park, to directly compensate individual victims of Japanese colonization of Korea, but it was the Park administration that insisted it would handle the individual compensation to the victims, and took over the entire amount of the grant, $300,000,000 (equivalent to $3.064941922×10^{9} in 2025) (for 35 years of Japanese colonial rule in Korea), on behalf of the victims. The Park administration negotiated for a total of $360,000,000 (equivalent to $3.677930306×10^{9} in 2025) in compensation for the 1.03 million Koreans conscripted into the forced labor and military service during the colonial period but received only $300,000,000 (equivalent to $3.064941922×10^{9} in 2025).

==== China ====
Park's government had no diplomatic relations with the People's Republic of China, but did attempt to establish trade in chili peppers unsuccessfully in 1974 and successfully in 1978, contributing to a softening of tensions between the two Cold War enemies.

=== Economic policy ===
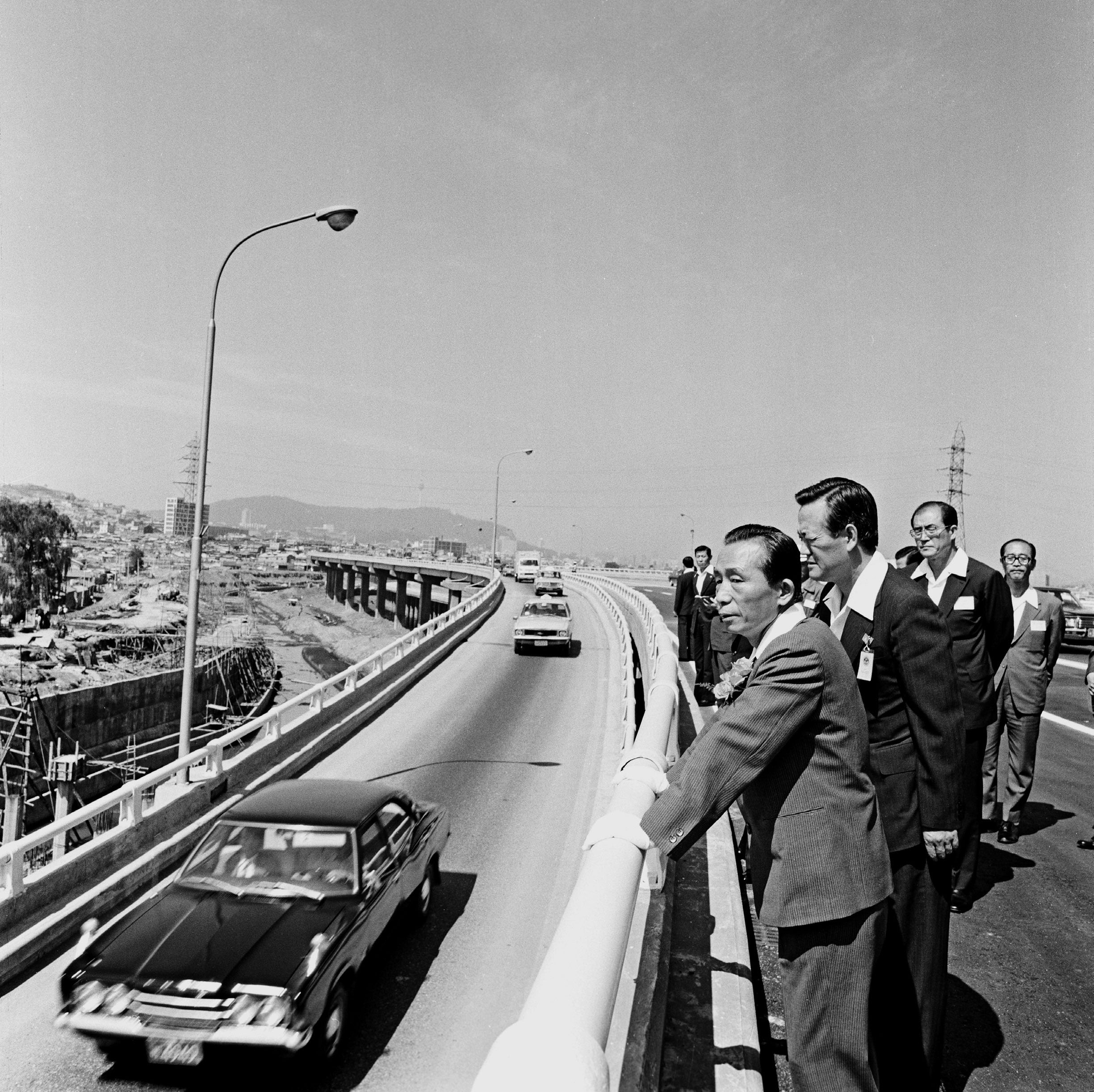
Park Chung Hee in 1976

One of Park's main goals was to end the extreme poverty prevalent in South Korea, and lift the country up from being an underdeveloped economy to a developed economy via statist methods. Government-corporate partnership on expanding South Korean exports helped lead to the growth of some South Korean infant companies into today's giant Korean conglomerates, the chaebols. Using the Soviet Union and its Five Year Plans as a model, Park launched his first Five Year Plan in 1962 by declaring the city of Ulsan as a "special industrial development zone". The chaebol of Hyundai took advantage of Ulsan's special status to make the city the home of its main factories.

Park is credited with playing a pivotal role in the development of South Korea's tiger economy by shifting its focus to export-oriented industrialisation. As part of Park's export-driven development strategy, he "prioritized preferential loans to export businesses and insulated domestic industries from external competition." When he came to power in 1961, South Korea's per capita income was only US$72.00. North Korea was the greater economic and military power on the peninsula due to the North's history of heavy industries such as the power and chemical plants, and the large amounts of economic, technical and financial aid it received from other communist bloc countries such as the Soviet Union, East Germany and China.

One of Park's reforms was to bring in 24 hour provision of electricity in 1964, which was a major change as previously homes and businesses were provided with electricity for a few hours every day. With the second Five Year Plan in 1967, Park founded the Kuro Industrial Park in southwestern Seoul, and created the state owned Pohang Iron and Steel Company Limited to provide cheap steel for the chaebol, who were founding the first automobile factories and shipyards in South Korea. Reflecting its statist tendencies, the Park government rewarded chaebol who met their performance-based export quotas targets under the Five Year Plans with loans on easy terms of repayment, tax cuts, easy licensing and subsidies.

It was common from the late 1960s onward for South Koreans to speak of the "octopus" nature of the chaebols as they began to extend their "tentacles" into all sectors of the economy. Some of the successful chaebols like Lucky Goldstar (LG) and Samsung went back to the Japanese period while others like Hyundai were founded shortly after the end of Japanese rule; all would go to become world-famous companies. Hyundai, which began as a transport firm moving supplies for the U.S. Army during the Korean War, came to dominate the South Korean construction industry in the 1960s, and in 1967 opened its first car factory, building automobiles under license for Ford.

In 1970, Hyundai finished the construction of the Seoul-Pusan Expressway, which became one of the busiest highways of South Korea, and in 1975 produced the Pony, its first car that was designed entirely by its own engineers. Besides manufacturing automobiles and construction, Hyundai moved into shipbuilding, cement, chemicals and electronics, ultimately becoming one of the world's largest corporations. On August 3, 1972, Park enacted an "Emergency Financial Act of August 3rd" (8·3긴급금융조치), which banned all private loans to make the foundation of economic growth, and supported chaebols even further. He also launched heavy industrialization in 1973, over strong objections from the World Bank and consequently laid the foundation for a self-reliant defense industry.

A sign of the growth of the South Korean economy was that in 1969 there were 200,000 television sets in operation in South Korea, and by 1979 there were six million television sets operating in South Korea. In 1969, only 6% of South Korean families owned a television; by 1979 four of every five South Korean families owned a TV. However, all television in South Korea was in black and white, and the color television did not come to South Korea until 1979. Reflecting the growth of TV ownership, the state-owned Korean Broadcasting System (KBS) began to produce more programming, while private sector corporation MBC began operating in 1969. During the Yushin era, television productions were subjected to strict censorship with, for example, men with long hair being banned from appearing on TV, but soap operas became a cultural phenomenon in the 1970s, becoming extremely popular.

South Korean industry saw remarkable development under Park's leadership. Park viewed Japan's development model, in particular the Ministry of International Trade and Industry (MITI) and the Keiretsu, as an model for Korea. Park emulated MITI by establishing the Ministry of Trade and Industry (MTI) and the Economic Planning Board (EPB).

Park also paid great attention to education for the low-income class and led the reform in the education sector, raising the educational standard of South Korea and promoting social equality. To increase access to education, the government expanded investment in education policies, and as a result, children from economically vulnerable families could benefit from it. President Park's educational reforms have raised the standard of education in the Republic of Korea and are affecting the current Korean education system. In the late 1960s, Park abolished the middle school entrance examination in favor of a more egalitarian educational system.

According to the Gapminder Foundation extreme poverty was reduced from 66.9 percent in 1961 to 11.2 percent in 1979, making this one of the fastest and largest reductions in poverty in human history. This growth also encompassed declines in child mortality and increases in life expectancy. From 1961 to 1979 child mortality declined by 64%, the third-fastest decrease in child mortality of any country with over 10 million inhabitants during the same period.

==== West Germany ====
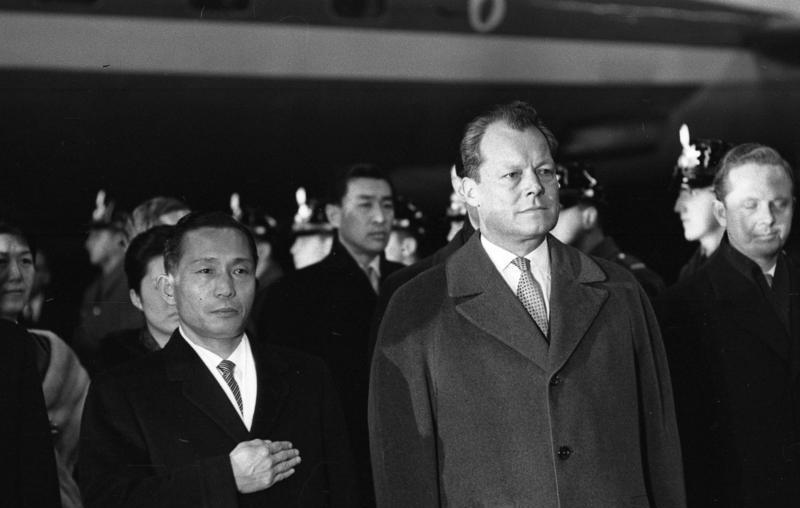
Park with Willy Brandt in West Germany, 1964

Park's economic policy was highlighted by South Korea's relationship with West Germany. Park had an affinity for Germany due to his perception of it having strong leadership like that of Otto von Bismarck and Adolf Hitler, and wanted to create ties with West Germany to deal with the problems of increasing population growth and economic hardships as well as received an inflow of foreign capital for domestic development. Upon an agreement in 1961, South Korea sent labor forces to West Germany, including more than 8,000 mine workers and 10,000 nurses, which continued until 1977. (See Gastarbeiter and Koreans in Germany)

==== Iran ====
Park was close friends with the last Shah of Iran, Mohammad Reza Pahlavi, who had established diplomatic relations in 1962 and following a visit to Iran in 1969, developed a close relationship with the two countries. Park realized the importance of Iran in securing oil for South Korea's industrial development and by 1973, was their main and only source of oil during the Oil Crisis. Most refineries in South Korea were built to process Iranian crude and thousands of engineers and workers were sent to Iran to help develop their refining capability.

The relationship eventually expanded beyond oil as Park promoted other industries to operate in Iran. Many chaebols went to Iran, including Hyundai Engineering & Construction, whose first Middle East Project were a series of shipyards in Bandar Abbas and Chahbahar to help develop Iran's maritime industry. Park's favorite architect Kim Swoo-Geun and his office designed the Ekbatan Complex in Tehran and the South Korean Special Forces helped train the Imperial Iranian Navy Commandos.

Park invited the Shah in 1978 for a special "South Korea-Iran" summit to further deepen relations, but due to the Iranian Revolution, it never materialized. In preparation for that summit, Tehran and Seoul became sister cities and the two exchanged street names as well; Teheran-ro in Gangnam and Seoul Street in Tehran which both still remain.

=== Domestic policy ===
Among Park's first actions upon assuming control of South Korea in 1961 was to pass strict legislation metrifying the country and banning the use of traditional Korean measurements like the li and pyeong. Despite its strict wording, the law's enforcement was so spotty as to be considered a failure, with the government abandoning prosecution under its terms by 1970. In the end, South Korea's traditional units continued until June 2001.

After taking office for his second term in 1967, Park promised that, in accordance with the 1963 Constitution which limited the president to two consecutive terms, he would step down in 1971. However, soon after his 1967 victory, the Democratic Republican-dominated National Assembly successfully pushed through an amendment allowing the incumbent president —himself— to run for three consecutive terms.

In the meantime, Park grew anxious of the shift in US policy towards communism under Richard Nixon's Guam Doctrine. His government's legitimacy depended on staunch anti-communism, and any moderation of that policy from South Korea's allies (including the US) threatened the very basis of his rule. Park began to seek options to further cement his hold on the country. In May 1970, the Catholic poet Kim Chi-ha was arrested for supposedly violating the Anti-Communist Law for his poem Five Bandits, which in fact had no references to Communism either explicitly or implicitly, but instead attacked corruption under Park. The issue of the journal Sasanggye that published the Five Bandits was shut down by the government.

One of the eponymous bandits of the Five Bandits is described as a general who began his career fighting for Japan in World War Two, and all of the bandits of the poem are described as chinilpa collaborators who served Japan because of their greed and amorality. Park recognized the reference to himself in Five Bandits with the character of the general while the fact that all of the bandits have a chinilpa background was a reference to the social basis of Park's regime. In 1974, Kim was sentenced to death for his poem, and though he was not executed, he spent almost all of the 1970s in prison.

Later in 1970, Park launched his Saemaul Undong (New Village Movement) that set out to modernize the countryside by providing electricity and running water to farmers, building paved roads, and replacing thatched roofs with tin roofs. The roofing project was said to reflect a personal obsession on the part of Park, who could not stand the sight of thatched roofs on farmers' homes, which for him was a sign of South Korea's backwardness. Park used asbestos for fixing rustic houses, which is harmful to humans.

In 1971, Park won another close election against his rival, Kim Dae-jung. That December, shortly after being sworn in, he declared a state of emergency "based on the dangerous realities of the international situation". In October 1972, Park dissolved the legislature and suspended the 1963 constitution in a self-coup. Work then began on drafting a new constitution. Park had drawn inspiration for his self-coup from Ferdinand Marcos, President of the Philippines, who had orchestrated a similar coup a few weeks earlier.

A new constitution, the so-called Yushin Constitution was approved in a heavily rigged plebiscite in November 1972. Meaning "rejuvenation" or "renewal" (as well as "restoration" in some contexts), scholars see the term's usage as Park alluding to himself as an "imperial president".

The new Yushin constitution was a highly authoritarian document. It transferred the presidential election process to an electoral college, the National Conference for Unification. It also dramatically expanded the president's powers. Notably, he was given sweeping powers to rule by decree and suspend constitutional freedoms. The presidential term was increased from four to six years, with no limits on re-election. For all intents and purposes, it codified the emergency powers Park had exercised for the past year, transforming his presidency into a legal dictatorship. As per his new constitution, Park ran for a fresh term as president in December 1972, and won unopposed. He was reelected in 1978 also unopposed. Many of South Korea's leading writers were opposed to the Park regime, and many of the best remembered poems and novels of the 1970s satirized the Yushin system.

Park argued that Western-style liberal democracy was not suitable for South Korea due to its still-shaky economy. He believed that in the interest of stability, the country needed a "Korean-style democracy" with a strong, unchallenged presidency. Although he repeatedly promised to open up the regime and restore full democracy, fewer and fewer people believed him.

In 1974, Park cracked down on the People's Revolutionary Party, a self-proclaimed leftist party and the first since Park seized power in 1961, with the National Security Law, that resulted in the execution of eight people. Park, a Buddhist, also feuded with leftist and progressive minjung Christian leaders, who became leading champions for human rights and democracy. In 1973, leftist Christian leaders openly defied Park by publishing the "Theological Declaration" which publicly condemned the "dehumanization and injustice" of the Park administration. Tensions deepened in the late 1970s over the Protestant-sponsored Urban Industrial Mission (UIM), an activist group that Park's government heavily suppressed for organizing and advocating for poorly paid factory workers. However, evangelical leaders such as American pastor Bill Bright supported Park's actions against the leftist Christian pastors.

In 1975, in preparation for South Korea's bid to host the 1988 Olympic Games, Park ordered the police to "cleanse" the streets and expel beggars, vagrants and street vendors who gave the country a bad image abroad. "Police officers, assisted by shop owners, rounded up panhandlers, small-time street merchants selling gum and trinkets, the disabled, lost or unattended children, and dissidents, including a college student who'd been holding anti-government leaflets." Thousands of people were arrested during this social cleansing campaign. Arrestees were distributed between 36 detention facilities, the largest of which was Brothers Home, and subjected to forced labor. Torture and rape was common in these facilities. "By 1986, the number of inmates had jumped over five years from 8,600 to more than 16,000, according to government documents...." Officially, 513 people died of exhaustion in these camps, but the number could be much higher.

Park abolished the usage of hanja or Chinese characters and established hangul exclusivity for the Korean language in the 1960s and 1970s. After a Five-Year Hangul Exclusivity Plan (한글종양오년계획) was promulgated through legislative and executive means, from 1970, using hanja became illegal in all grades of public school and in the military. This led to increased literacy in South Korea.

=== Final years of presidency ===
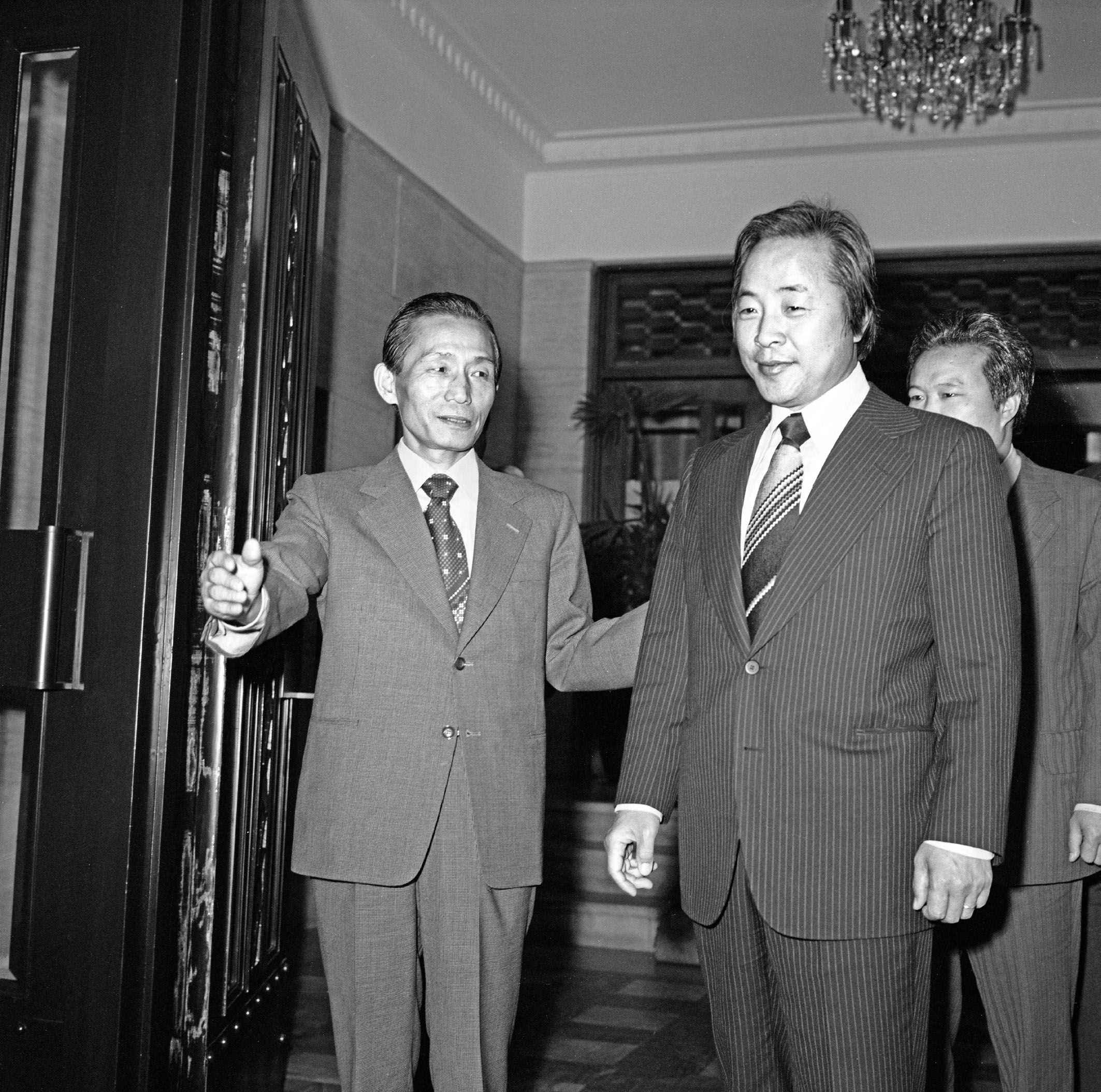
Park with future President Kim Young-sam in 1975

During the final years of his presidency, Park realized that people were not satisfied with the government. Despite this, his autocracy became increasingly open in this period.

==== Military ====
As president, Park tried to strengthen the military, often citing hard power as a signal of independence. Park ordered the development of missiles to deter Pyongyang. Due to a lack of technical knowledge, Korean engineers had to travel to the United States to learn technological knowledge on the development of missiles. After a painstaking development, on September 26, 1978, Nike Hercules Korea-1 (Hyunmoo) had its successful first launch. But the development of missiles were temporarily halted when Chun Doo-hwan took power. Park also tried to develop his homegrown nuclear weapons program, announcing that they would be made by 1983. It never progressed after Park's death in 1979.

== Government of Park Chung Hee ==
=== Choi Tu-son Cabinet ===
Park launched his first cabinet at the presidential inauguration on December 17, 1963. The cabinet was headed by Choi Tu-son, a critic of Park who was nominated for the premiership a few days earlier in accordance with Park's policy of embracement. The life of this cabinet was swift, as it resigned in May 1964 due to opposition protests against a treaty with Japan.

It's the first South Korean cabinet to appoint a Deputy Prime Minister.

Portfolio	Minister	Took office	Left office	Party
Prime Minister	Choi Tu-son	December 17, 1963	May 9, 1964	Independent
Deputy Prime Minister and Minister for Economic Planning Board	Kim Yoo-taek	December 17, 1963	May 10, 1964	Democratic Republican Party
Minister of Foreign Affairs	Chung Il-Kwon	December 17, 1963	July 24, 1964	Democratic Republican Party
Minister of Interior Affairs	Um Min-young	December 17, 1963	May 10, 1964	Independent
Minister of Finance	Park Dong-Kyu	December 17, 1963	June 25, 1964	Independent
Minister of Justice	Min Bok-ki	December 17, 1963	September 25, 1966	Independent
Minister of National Defense	Kim Sung-eun	December 17, 1963	February 27, 1968	Military
Minister of Education	Kauh Kwang-man	December 17, 1963	May 10, 1964	Independent
Minister of Agriculture and Forestry	Won Yong-suk	December 17, 1963	May 10, 1964	Democratic Republican Party
Minister of Trade and Industry	Lee Byung-ho	December 17, 1963	May 10, 1964	Independent
Minister of Construction	Jeong Nak-eun	December 17, 1963	May 10, 1964	Independent
Minister of Health and Social Affairs	Park Joo-byung	December 17, 1963	May 10, 1964	Independent
Minister of Transportation	Kim Yun-gi	December 17, 1963	May 10, 1964	Independent
Minister of Post and Telecommunications	Hong Heon-pyo	December 17, 1963	July 20, 1964	Independent
Minister for General Affairs Secretariat	Lee Suk-jae	December 17, 1963	October 20, 1969	Democratic Republican Party

== Death ==
=== Final years ===
Although the growth of the South Korean economy had secured a high level of support for Park's presidency in the 1960s, that support began to fade after economic growth started slowing in the early 1970s. Many South Koreans were becoming unhappy with increasing income inequality, poor labor rights, his autocratic rule, the brutality of his security services and the restrictions placed on personal freedoms. While Park had legitimized his administration partially with the provisions laid down in the state of emergency laws dating back to the Korean War and his economic achievements, he also failed to address the constitutional guarantees of freedom of speech and freedom of the press. The number of protests dramatically increased in the 1960s and 70s. Furthermore, the security service, the KCIA, retained broad powers of arrest and detention; many of Park's opponents were held without trial and frequently tortured. Eventually demonstrations against the Yushin system erupted throughout the country as Park's unpopularity began to rise.

These demonstrations came to a decisive moment on October 16, 1979, when student groups calling for the end of dictatorship and the Yushin system began at Busan National University. The action, which was part of the "Pu-Ma" struggle (named for the Pusan and Masan areas), soon moved into the streets of the city where students and riot police fought all day. By evening, up to 50,000 people had gathered in front of Busan city hall. Over the next two days several public offices were attacked and around 400 protesters were arrested. On October 18, Park's government declared martial law in Busan. On the same day protests spread to Kyungnam University in Masan. Up to 10,000 people, mostly students and workers, joined the demonstrations against Park's Yushin System. Violence quickly escalated with attacks being launched at police stations and city offices of the ruling party. By nightfall a citywide curfew was put into place in Masan.

=== Assassination ===
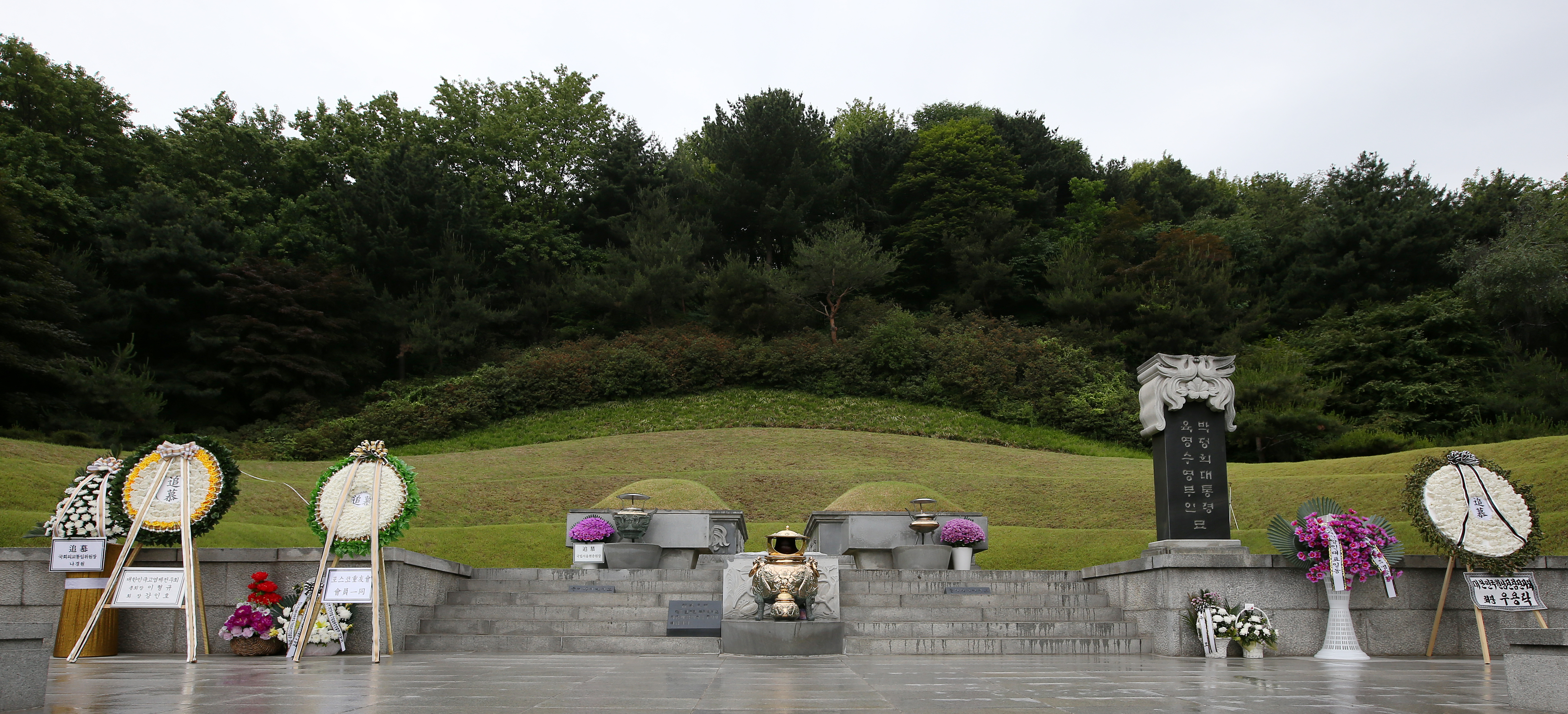
Tombs of Yuk Young-soo and Park Chung Hee (2015)

On October 26, 1979, six days after the student protests ended, Park Chung Hee was fatally shot in the head and chest by Kim Jae-gyu, the director of the KCIA, after a banquet at a safehouse in Gungjeong-dong, Jongno District, Seoul. Other KCIA officers then went to other parts of the building shooting dead four more presidential guards. Cha Ji-chul, chief of the Presidential Security Service and a rival to Kim, was also fatally shot. Kim and his group were later arrested by soldiers. Kim Jae-kyu and his co-conspirators were tortured and later executed in March 1980.

It is unclear whether this was a spontaneous act of passion by an individual or part of a pre-arranged attempted coup by the intelligence service. Kim claimed that Park was an obstacle to democracy and that his act was one of patriotism. The investigation's head, Chun Doo-hwan, rejected his claims and concluded that Kim acted to preserve his own power.

Choi Kyu-hah became Acting President in pursuant to Article 48 of the Yushin Constitution. Major General Chun Doo-hwan quickly amassed sweeping powers after his Defense Security Command was charged with investigating the assassination, first taking control of the military and the KCIA before installing another military junta and finally assuming the presidency in 1980.

Park, who was said to be a devout Buddhist, was accorded the first South Korean interfaith state funeral on November 3 in Seoul. He was buried with full military honors at the National Cemetery near the grave of former president Syngman Rhee who died in 1965.

== Personal life ==
Park divorced his first wife, Kim Ho-nam, in 1950. Park professed to being and was reportedly a distant husband and father. His divorce request was seen as sudden and surprising for both Kim and the couple's daughter Park Jae-ok. Kim attempted to but failed to resist the divorce, and moved out of the household with her daughter. Eventually, she moved into a Buddhist temple in Busan, where she spent much of the rest of her life. Jae-ok left her mother at age 13 and moved to Seoul for high school. There, Park's new wife Yuk Young-soo learned of Jae-ok's existence, and invited her to come live with Park's new family. Park reportedly attempted to apologize to Jae-ok on a number of occasions, but she rebuffed all of these attempts. Eventually, she married diplomat Han Byeong-gi, and spent much of the rest of her life abroad and out of the public spotlight. The two never reconciled, which she later expressed regret for.

Park's eldest daughter from his second marriage (with Yuk Young-soo), Park Geun-hye, became South Korea's 11th president and first female president in 2013. Park Geun-hye's association to her father's legacy has caused her to be labeled the daughter of a dictator. Her political association with the daughter of a spiritual leader (Choi Tae-min) hired by the elder Park eventually led to her downfall in 2016. She was impeached in 2016 and removed from office in 2017.

In later literature, including a popular memoir from his chief of staff, Park is depicted as not personally corrupt, amassing little in the way of private fortune during his rule. During his postwar service as an army general during the 1950s, it is reported that he did not misappropriate army resources or accept bribery for personal enrichment. His refusal to partake in bribes and payoff ruling Liberal Party machinery when he was the chief of military supplies in Pusan, a lucrative position as the center for US military supplies disbursal, saw his two-year term shortened to six months. Byung-Kook Kim reports the only identified instance of possible corruption was half a million dollars found in a personal safe following his death but it is not clear whether this money was for his own use or enticements for political purposes.

=== Family tree ===
Family of Park Chung Hee

Pak Sŏngbin; 1871–1938	Paek Namŭi; 1872–1949
Park Dong-hui; 1895–1972	Park Mu-hui; 1898–1960	Park Gui-hui; 1901–1974	Park Sang-hui; 1906–1946	Park Han-saeng; 1911–1925	Park Jae-hui; 1913–1996	Kim Ho-nam; 1920–1990	Park Chung Hee; 1917–1979	Yuk Young-soo; 1925–1974
Park Jae-ok; 1937–2020	Park Geun-hye; 1952–	Park Geun Ryeong; 1954–	Park Ji-man; 1958–

Notes
- Dashed lines represent marriages
- Solid lines represent descendants
- Yellow for Park Chung Hee, pink for female, light blue for male

== Electoral record ==
Year	Elections	Constituency	Political party	No. of votes	%	Results
1963	1963 Presidential Election	South Korea	Democratic Republican Party	4,762,640	46.64%	Won
1967	1967 Presidential Election	South Korea	Democratic Republican Party	5,688,666	51.44%	Won
1971	1971 Presidential Election	South Korea	Democratic Republican Party	6,342,828	53.19%	Won
1972	1972 Presidential Election	South Korea	Democratic Republican Party	2,357	99.92%	Won
1978	1978 Presidential Election	South Korea	Democratic Republican Party	2,577	99.85%	Won

== Legacy ==
Park Chung Hee remains a controversial figure in South Korea. The eighteen-year Park era is considered to be one of the most controversial topics for the Korean public, politicians, and scholars. Opinion is split regarding his legacy, between those who credit Park for his reforms and those who condemn his authoritarian rule, especially after 1971. Older generations who spent their adulthood during Park's rule tend to credit Park for building the economic foundation of the country and protecting the country from North Korea, as well as leading Korea to economic and global prominence. On the other hand, left-leaning progressive activists, journalists, scholars and writers who have been involved in the democratization movement were critical of his rule, going as far as attributing the popular nostalgia for Park to the Korean people's failure to extirpate pro-Japanese elites and their subsequent dominance in postcolonial Korea. Park was listed as one of the top ten "Asians of the Century" by Time magazine in 1999.

An October 2021 Gallup Korea public opinion poll showed Park Chung Hee, Roh Moo-hyun, and Kim Dae-jung as the most highly rated presidents of South Korean history. The poll showed Park received a favorability rating of 72% and 82% from citizens in the age range of 50–60 and 60+ years respectively, and a favorability rating of 43% and 64% from citizens in the age range of 20–30 and 30–40 years, respectively.

Park Geun-hye, Park's eldest daughter, became the 11th president of South Korea and the first female president of South Korea. Park Geun-hye's parentage served as a considerable source of controversy during the 2012 presidential election and throughout her administration, as detractors described her as the daughter of a dictator. Park was impeached, removed from office, and later sentenced to 27 years in prison as a result of an influence-peddling scandal. Park was released in 2021 from the Seoul Detention Center. Park's rule is also believed to be one of the main causes of regionalism which is a serious problem in Korea today.

=== Economic impact ===
Park has been recognized and respected by many South Koreans as an exceptionally efficient leader, credited with making South Korea economically prosperous to what it is today. Park led the Miracle on the Han River, a period of rapid economic growth in South Korea. Under Park's rule, South Korea possessed one of the fastest growing national economies during the 1960s and 1970s, becoming one of the Four Asian Tigers.

There were also many economic feats established during Park's regime, including the building of the Gyeongbu Expressway, the creation of the steel giant POSCO, the famous Five-Year Plans of South Korea, and the New Community Movement.

According to the Gapminder Foundation, extreme poverty was reduced from 66.9 percent in 1961 to 11.2 percent in 1979, making one of the fastest and largest reductions in poverty in human history. This growth also encompassed declines in child mortality and increases in life expectancy. From 1961 to 1979 child mortality declined by 64%, the third-fastest decrease in child mortality of any country with over 10 million inhabitants during the same period. Economic growth continued after Park's death and after considerable political turmoil in the wake of his assassination and military coups.

=== Authoritarian rule ===
Park is regarded by critics as a highly repressive dictator who curtailed freedoms and committed human rights abuses during his rule. Dissolving the constitution to allow him unopposed rule, Park's blackmailing, arresting, jailing, and murdering of opposition figures are well documented, especially with the use of his feared Korean Central Intelligence Agency (KCIA). The new constitution President Park implemented after declaring the state of emergency in 1971 gave him the power to appoint one third of the members of the National Assembly and even outlawed criticism of the constitution and of the president.

Kim Dae-jung, a chief opponent of Park who was kidnapped from Japan, but was later released and placed under house arrest after Park came under diplomatic pressure from the United States. Kim later became the first opposition leader to be democratically elected as President of South Korea in 1998. On October 24, 2007, following an internal inquiry, South Korea's National Intelligence Service (NIS) admitted that its precursor, the KCIA, undertook the kidnapping of Kim, saying it had at least tacit backing from Park.

=== Relationship with Japan ===
Park was accused of having pro-Japanese tendencies by detractors. Park was responsible for the normalization of relations with Japan and today Japan is one of South Korea's top trading partners, surpassed only by the People's Republic of China and the United States, as well as a close military ally against North Korea. The state nationalist (국가주의,國家主義) policies of the Park Chung Hee administration were influenced by Manchukuo economic system, and Japanese pre-war "statist" politics. He was also inspired by the Japanese Zaibatsu conglomerates that have led Japan post-war economic miracle, eventually creating the Korean version of conglomerates. Park Chung Hee's political philosophy was influenced by Ikki Kita and Nobusuke Kishi.

The South Korean Center for Historical Truth and Justice (CHTJ) describes Park as a collaborator with Imperial Japan in their controversial Dictionary of Pro-Japanese Collaborators and Museum of Japanese Colonial History in Korea.

Park's relationship regarding Japan has been extensively examined. Chong-Sik Lee points out that Park's admiration of both Admiral Yi Sun-sin and the Empire of Japan may seem contradictory. Lee argues that Park's admiration of Japan can be explained by his low opinion of the former Joseon Dynasty. Park saw the previous kings and the nobility as feudalistic and having failed to provide the lives of ordinary Koreans such as himself with education and economic mobility.

=== Memorials ===
A number of monuments and memorials to Park now exist. One of Park's houses in Seoul is now a National Registered Cultural Heritage. The Park Chung-hee Presidential Museum opened in 2021.

== Bibliography ==
- Our Nation's Path (우리 민족의 나갈 길; 1962)
- The Country, the Revolution and I (국가와 혁명과 나; 1963)
- My Boyhood (나의 소년 시절; 1970)
- To Build a Nation (민족의 저력; 1971)
- Korea Reborn: A Model for Development (민족중흥의 길; 1978)

== Honors ==
=== National honors ===
- South Korea:
  - Recipient of the Grand Order of Mugunghwa (1963)
  - Recipient of the Order of Merit for National Foundation (Order of the Republic of Korea, 1979) (posthumous)
  - Recipient of the Order of Diplomatic Service Merit (Grand Gwanghwa Medal, 1964; Grand Gwanghwa Cordon, 1975)
  - Recipient of the Order of National Security Merit (Tongil Medal, 1963)
  - Recipient of the Order of Military Merit (Chungmu Cordon Medal, 1950, 1953, 1954, 1957)
  - Recipient of the Order of Military Merit (Taegeuk Cordon Medal, 1964)
  - Recipient of the Order of Military Merit (Hwarang Cordon Medal, 1951)
  - Recipient of the Order of Military Merit (Eulji Cordon Medal, 1955 twice)

=== Foreign honors ===
- El Salvador:
  - Grand Officer of the Order of José Matías Delgado (1970)
- Ethiopian Empire:
  - Grand Cordon of the Order of the Queen of Sheba (1968)
- Gabon:
  - Grand Cross of the Order of the Equatorial Star (1975)
- West Germany:
  - Grand Cross of the Order of Merit of the Federal Republic of Germany (1964)
- Malaysia:
  - Honorary Recipient of the Most Exalted Order of the Crown of the Realm (1965)
- Mexico:
  - Grand Cross of the Order of the Aztec Eagle (1971)
- Niger:
  - Grand Cross of the National Order of Niger (1969)
- Senegal:
  - Grand Cross of the National Order of the Lion (1979)
- South Vietnam:
  - Grand Cross of the National Order of Vietnam (1963)
- Taiwan:
  - Special Grand Cordon of the Order of Propitious Clouds (1966)
- Thailand:
  - Knight of the Order of the Rajamitrabhorn (1966)

== In popular culture ==
- The President's Last Bang
- The Man Standing Next
- The President's Barber

== See also ==
- List of presidents of South Korea

== Notes ==
Political offices
Preceded by Yun Po-sun	President of South Korea (Acting); 24 March 1962 – 16 December 1963	Succeeded by Himself
Preceded by Yun Po-sun; Himself (Acting)	President of South Korea; December 17 1963 – October 26 1979	Succeeded by Choi Kyu-hah (Acting); Choi Kyu-hah
Party political offices
Preceded by Jeong Gu-young	President of the Democratic Republican Party; 31 August 1963–26 October 1979	Succeeded by Park Jun-kyu (Acting); Kim Jong-pil
Preceded by New Office	Democratic Republican Party nominee for President of South Korea; 1963, 1967, 1971, 1972, 1978	Succeeded by Office abolished
