= 1972 South Korean presidential election =

- 23 December 1972

2,359 members of the National Conference for Unification 1,180 votes needed to win
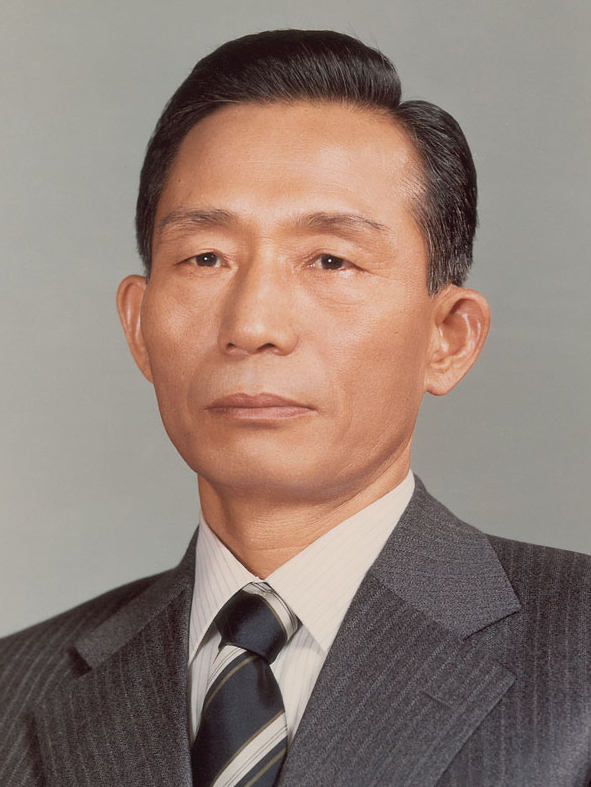
Nominee	Park Chung-hee
Party	Democratic Republican
Electoral vote	2,357
Percentage	99.99%
- Votes of the National Conference for Unification Park Chung-hee: 2357 Invalid/Blank: 2
President before election
Park Chung-hee
Democratic Republican
Elected President
Park Chung-hee
Democratic Republican

Presidential elections were held in South Korea on 23 December 1972 following the promulgation of the Yushin Constitution, which created the National Conference for Unification, a body whose functions included being an electoral college for presidential elections. Incumbent President Park Chung-hee claimed that Western-style liberal democracy would bring more chaos to the economically struggling nation than it could afford. In contrast, he argued that the Yushin system created a "Korean-style democracy" with a strong, unchallenged presidency. He argued this system was necessary to keep the country stable.

== National Conference for Unification election ==
The 2,359 members of the first National Conference for Unification were elected to their six-year term on 5 December 1972, with a voter turnout of 70%. All candidates were required to run as independents. The Constitution gave the body many powers, such as forming policies related to inter-Korean relationship, and determining the president as well as one-third of the National Assembly. However, the body was little more than a rubber stamp, as all of its actions were controlled by the president.

Province/City	Electorate	Turnout	%	Valid votes	Delegates
Seoul	3,113,767	1,773,454	57.0	1,702,369	303
Busan	941,884	642,641	68.2	622,823	104
Gyeonggi	1,664,447	1,154,711	69.4	1,123,083	280
Gangwon	788,276	629,915	79.9	613,395	145
North Chungcheong	602,554	461,547	76.6	447,557	127
South Chungcheong	1,278,743	924,874	72.3	900,402	231
North Jeolla	1,092,516	838,211	76.7	810,011	200
South Jeolla	1,636,382	1,174,364	71.8	1,138,441	312
North Gyeongsang	1,970,647	1,507,092	76.5	1,457,409	354
South Gyeongsang	1,339,583	1,038,388	77.5	1,009,869	278
Jeju	170,818	138,596	81.1	135,242	25
Total	14,599,617	10,283,793	70.4	9,960,601	2,359

The newly sworn-in members of the National Conference for Unification convened on 23 December to elect Park to a fourth term as president. With no opposition candidates, Park was elected with the support of 2,357 out of the 2,359 delegates. The elections were regarded as a formality.

The National Conference for Unification members elected in 1972 would later approve Park's slate of nominees for one-third of the National Assembly in 1973 and 1976.

== Presidential election ==
In order to be elected, a candidate had to receive the vote of over 50% of the incumbent members of the National Council for Unification. With 2,359 delegates in office, Park had to receive at least 1,180 votes to be elected. He received 2,357 votes, 99.92% of the total possible.

As there was only one candidate registered, the only way the deputies could vote against Park was by casting invalid ballots. One of the two deputies who did that, Song Dong-heon from Daejeon-1 District, revealed later in his life that he purposefully wrote "박정의" (Park Chung-ee) instead of "박정희" (Park Chung-hee) on his ballot in order to protest the dictatorial regime.

Candidate	Party	Votes	%
Park Chung-hee	Democratic Republican Party	2,357	100.00
Total		2,357	100.00
Valid votes		2,357	99.92
Invalid/blank votes		2	0.08
Total votes		2,359	100.00
Registered voters/turnout		2,359	100.00
