= Cheongungak =

Historic house in Mungyeong, South Korea

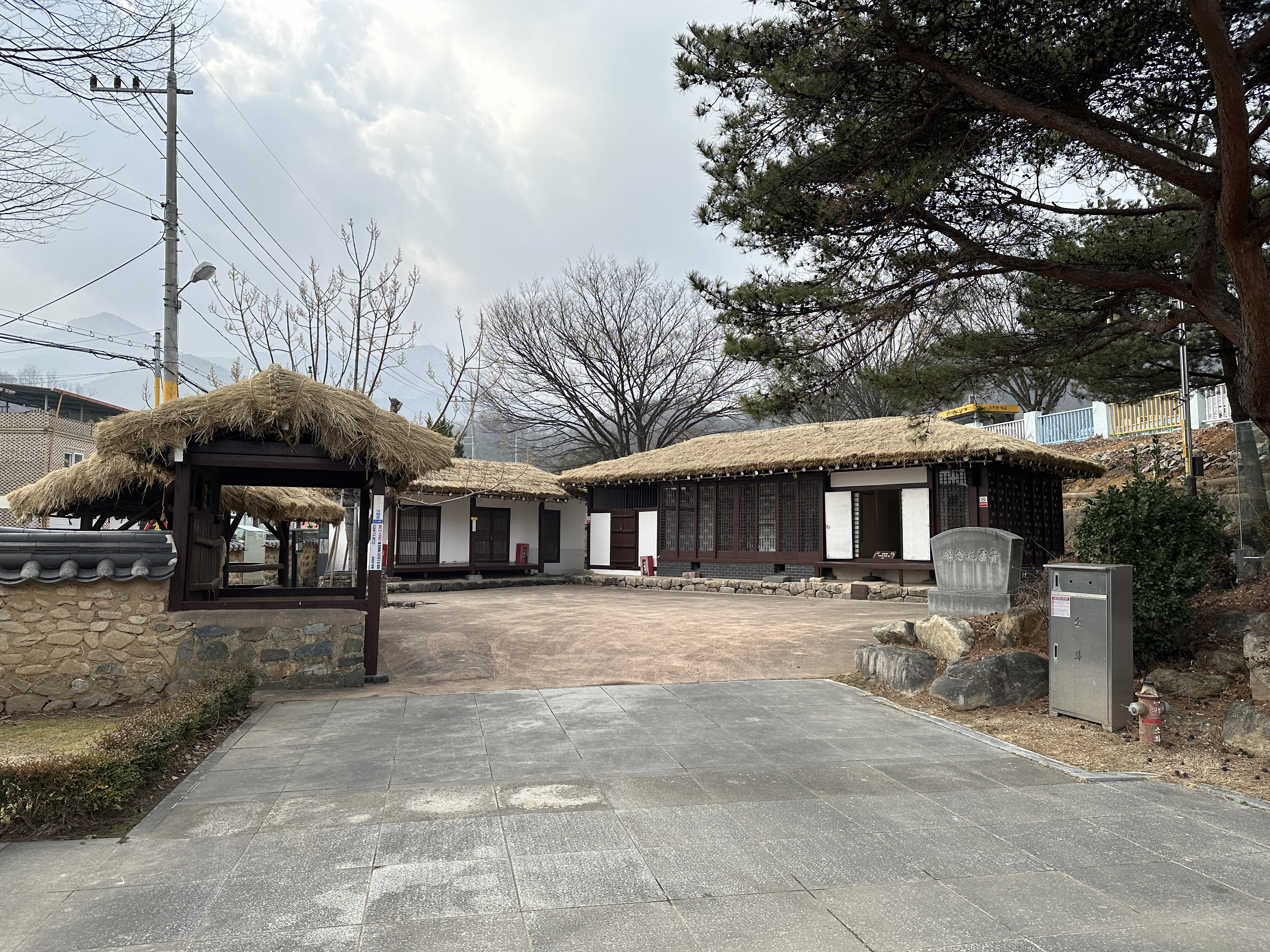
- Cheongungak. Park stayed in the right-hand building, in the rightmost room (2024)
- Interactive map of the Cheongungak area

General information
- Location: 35 Cheongun-ro, Mungyeong-eup, Mungyeong, North Gyeongsang Province, South Korea
- Coordinates: 36.73652°N 128.10494°E
- Completed: 1928

Design and construction
- Known for: Boarding house for Park Chung Hee

Korean name
- Hangul: 청운각
- Hanja: 靑雲閣
- RR: Cheongungak
- MR: Ch'ŏngun'gak

Cheongungak (Korean: 청운각; Hanja: 靑雲閣) is a historic boarding house in Sang-ri, Mungyeong-eup, Mungyeong, South Korea. It was constructed in 1928, and most notably was where South Korean leader Park Chung Hee stayed as a young man, from April 1937 to March 1940, when he taught at the nearby Mungyeong Public Normal School.

The complex consists of four traditional thatched-roof buildings (hanok), and includes an anchae and araechae (아래채; building generally for servants). Park visited the complex a number of times after he became leader, during his visits to Mungyeong.

The building was purchased by head of the Mungyeong Elementary School alumni association Kim Jong-ho (김종호) in 1976, and donated to the Mungyeong Office of Education. It became a protected property of North Gyeongsang Province in 1978, and went into the ownership of the Yuk Young-soo Memorial Foundation in 1995.

The complex was significantly renovated for two years, beginning in 2011. A small shrine building was constructed, along with various signs and displays describing the history of the area and of Park's life. The complex is now open to the public, and functions as a memorial to Park and his wife, Yuk Young-soo, with artifacts from and pictures of the couple displayed in various places in the complex. Entrance is free. Every year on October 26, the anniversary of Park's assassination, a ceremony is held here in honor of Park.

There is an apricot tree stump embedded into the wall of the complex. The tree apparently withered and died just two days after Park's death, which led to the tree being called the "Tree of Loyalty" (충절의 나무) by the locals. A well that Park used to drink from is still preserved. Another tree, dedicated to Park's daughter Park Geun-hye, is also present.
