= National Conference for Unification =

1972–1980 South Korean governmental body

- 통일주체국민회의

Commission overview
- Formed: 23 December 1972
- Dissolved: 27 October 1980
- Superseding Commission: Peaceful Unification Advisory Council
- Jurisdiction: Republic of Korea
- Commission executives: Park Chung Hee (23 December 1972 – 26 October 1979) , President; Kwak Sang-hoon (29 January 1973 – 12 February 1980) , Chairman of the Steering Committee

Korean name
- Hangul: 통일주체국민회의
- Hanja: 統一主體國民會議
- RR: Tongil juche gungmin hoeui
- MR: T'ongil chuch'e kungmin hoeŭi

The National Conference for Unification (Korean: 통일주체국민회의) was an organization of indirect democracy established in accordance with the Constitution when the 4th Republic was launched with the Yushin Constitution on 17 October 1972. The most important function was to promote independent peaceful reunification policies, which were the core of the Yushin Constitution, and indirect presidential elections during the 4th Republic From August 1973, the NCU was decided as National Assembly. The National Assembly was composed of delegates directly elected by the people from each district across the country, and the delegates of the National Assembly for Unification were unofficially called Tongdae.

== Overview ==
According to Chapter 3 of the Yushin Constitution of the Republic of Korea at the time, the National Assembly for Reunification was the top institution of the state and a sovereignly entrusted institution, a place where the people's consensus to promote the peaceful unification of the country was gathered. Therefore, the representatives of this institution with a term of office of 6 years are elected by direct election by the people, and the president is elected and one-third of the total number of members of the National Assembly (Yoo Shin-Jeong-Woo Association) is elected after being recommended by the president, and has the function of finalizing the amendment to the Constitution of the National Assembly and deliberating the unification policy.

Ahead of the ninth presidential election, the New Democratic Party proposed an amendment to the Representative Election Act of the National Council of Unification Subjects, which is the U.S. presidential elector election method in which the political party nominates a presidential candidate and the delegate candidates running for the representative election select the presidential candidate they support and hold an election.

In effect, this institution, which served as the flag bearer of President Park Chung Hee, took on the role of formally electing the successor presidents Choi Kyu-ha and Chun Doo-hwan after he was assassinated on 26 October 1979. After that, the agency in charge of the Presidential Election System was replaced by the Presidential Electoral College, and its role as an organization related to the secretariat, personnel composition, and unification under the direct control of the President continued through the 'Peace and Unification Policy Advisory Council' and then the Democratic and Peaceful Unification Advisory Council.
