= The Man Standing Next =

2020 South Korean political drama film

- Theatrical release poster
- Hangul: 남산의 부장들
- Hanja: 南山의 部長들
- RR: Namsanui bujangdeul
- MR: Namsanŭi pujangdŭl
- Directed by: Woo Min-ho
- Screenplay by: Woo Min-ho; Lee Ji-min
- Based on: The Man Standing Next by Kim Choong-sik
- Produced by: Kim Won-guk
- Starring: Lee Byung-hun; Lee Sung-min; Kwak Do-won; Lee Hee-joon
- Cinematography: Go Nak-seon
- Edited by: Jeong Ji-eun
- Music by: Jo Yeong-wook
- Production company: Hive Media Corp.
- Distributed by: Showbox
- Release date: 22 January 2020
- Running time: 114 minutes
- Country: South Korea
- Language: Korean
- Budget: $18 million
- Box office: $34.7 million

The Man Standing Next (Korean: 남산의 부장들; lit. 'Chiefs of Namsan') is a 2020 South Korean historical political thriller film directed by Woo Min-ho. Based on a book of the same title, the film stars Lee Byung-hun, Lee Sung-min, Kwak Do-won, and Lee Hee-joon as the high-ranking officials of the Korean government and the Korean Central Intelligence Agency (KCIA) during the presidency of Park Chung Hee 40 days before his assassination in 1979.

The film premiered in South Korea on 22 January 2020, where it topped the box office until 4 February 2020. It was released in the United States on 24 January 2020. It was selected as the South Korean entry for the Best International Feature Film at the 93rd Academy Awards, but it was not nominated.

== Synopsis ==
In the 1970s, South Korea is under the absolute control of President Park who controls the KCIA, the organization with an edge over any branch of government. The director of the KCIA, Kim Gyu-pyeong, is nearly the second-in-command, but faces rivalry from the president's security chief. Amid a reign of fear, a former KCIA director, Park Yong-gak, who knows all about the government's obscure and illegal operations, goes into exile, and testifies in front of the U.S. Congress, opening the floodgates to the investigation of Koreagate. As tension escalates, stifling political maneuvers by those desiring power collide explosively.

== Plot ==
Park Yong-gak, a former KCIA director, testifies against South Korean President Park in a United States Senate Committee investigation. With the threat of Park publishing his manuscript on the regime, President Park of South Korea sends Kim Gyu-pyeong, the current KCIA Director to stop Park Yong-gak from publishing his manuscript. Kim goes to Washington, where the two meet and Kim demands the manuscript from Park. Park Yong-gak hands it over but implies the president's corruption by suggesting that President Park is being financially backed by offshore Swiss accounts.

With his mission accomplished, Kim returns to South Korea and consequently, faces conflict with Kwak Sang-cheol, President Park's bodyguard. A wiretapping plot on the president is discovered and Kim becomes suspicious of a professor who is present at the search in the President's office. Through interrogation, Kim finds out that a KCIA agent has acted without orders from him. He sends an agent, Ham Dae-yong, to Paris to further investigate the situation.

In Paris, through means of wiretapping, Ham discovers that the KCIA agent was not acting on his own, but rather under orders from Kwak. Through this, it is discovered that Kwak has ordered the assassination of ex-Director Park, who will be visiting Paris. It is during this time that President Park gives Director Kim the freedom to do what he wishes with the ex-Director. Kim, not to be outdone by Kwak, resolves to have Park Yong-gak killed.

In Paris, two different teams both to assassinate ex-director Park prepare to kill him. Kwak's team seeks to lure Park into his room, while Kim's team seeks to kidnap him and then kill him. With the help of Park Yong-gak's aide, Deborah Shim, who is used as bait, Director Kim's team can nab ex-Director Park first, driving him out of Paris. However, Park can momentarily escape to a nearby town but is tracked down by Ham, who promptly kills him. He disposed of Park Yong-gak's body to ground up in a hammer mill which is a grinder at a chicken farm and turned into chicken feed.

Park is displeased with Kim's handling, however, noting that Kim didn't solve the problem of apparently stolen finances that were procured by Park Yong-gak. Kim's friendship with President Park deteriorates further as a result and Park begins distrusting Kim. Kim, who is deeply torn by the killing, as the ex-Director was his friend, begins to break down under stress.

Sometime after the killing of ex-director Park, President Park and his administration are faced with a new issue in the form of pro-democracy protests in Pusan and Masan, as well as fears that these protests could spread to Seoul. Kwak takes a hardline stance, advising harsh and swift military intervention, and declaration of martial law. Kim suggests a more levelhanded approach and urges Park to avoid declaring martial law. Park, favoring Kwak, proceeds with a declaration of martial law.

Following this, Kim is told that Park is holding a banquet but has not invited him, but rather Kwak. Kim goes anyway to eavesdrop on Park and Kwak and learns that Park is considering replacing Kim. Yet again, Park gives a subordinate clearance to do what they wish, the subordinate this time being Kwak.

On October 26, Park is doing a day of ribbon-cutting ceremonies for a dam in Sapgyo. Kim attempts to join him and Kwak at the helicopter, but Kwak bars him from joining. Riled, Kim calls his subordinates with the intent of planning something. That night, Park invites Kim to dinner. It's intended to be an apology of sorts, but Kim is unmoved.

During the dinner, Kim leaves to get a pistol, meets with his subordinates, and tells them that he will kill Park. Upon returning to the room, the conversation becomes heated. It culminates in Kim shooting and wounding Kwak in the arm. He then turns on Park and shoots him too. As this happens, Kim's subordinates organize a coordinated attack on the compound where the dinner is being held and kill the remaining bodyguards. Kim attempts to finish Kwak, but the pistol jams and he is forced to leave the room to get another gun from an agent. At this time, the light goes off and then comes back on. He returns to the room, shooting and killing Kwak and killing Park with a shot to the head.

Kim quickly leaves with his subordinates and the notables present at the compound during the attack. He is given the choice between going to Namsan or the Army Headquarters. The Chief Presidential Secretary, bearing witness to the assassination, suggests that he go to the Army Headquarters. Kim considers this as the screen fades to black. After the screen goes black, a subtitle appears that Kim Gyu-pyeong was arrested at the Army Headquarters and hanged as the culprit in the President's assassination. The movie ends with a text saying that Kim chose to drive to the Army Headquarters, where he was caught. The voice of Chun Doo-hwan, the actual model of Chun Doo-hyuk, and the voice of Kim Jae-gyu, the actual model of Kim Gyu-pyeong, appear.

== Cast ==
- Lee Byung-hun as Kim Gyu-pyeong: the fictional lead character based on Kim Jae-gyu, who served as the 8th KCIA director from 1976 to 1979
- Lee Sung-min as President Park: based on Park Chung Hee, the 3rd President of South Korea and father to Park Geun-hye, the 11th President of South Korea
- Kwak Do-won as Park Yong-gak: the character based on Kim Hyong-uk, who served as the 4th KCIA director from 1963 to 1969
- Lee Hee-joon as Kwak Sang-cheon: the character based on Cha Ji-cheol, who served as the 3rd director of the Presidential Security Service
- Kim So-jin as Deborah Shim, a lobbyist
- Seo Hyun-woo as Chun Doo-hyuk: the character based on Chun Doo-hwan, the 10th KCIA director and the chief of the Defence Security Command, who later became the 5th President of South Korea
- Park Ji-il as Kim Gye-hoon: the character based on Kim Gye-won, the 5th KCIA director, who served as the 18th Chief of Staff of the Republic of Korea Army
- Kim Min-sang as Jang Seung-ho: the character based on Jeong Seung-hwa, who served as the 22nd Chief of Staff of the Republic of Korea Army
- Park Seong-geun as Kang Chang-soo: the character based on Park Heung-ju, a KCIA officer and Army colonel
- Jung Mi-hyung as Female singer: the character based on Sim Soo-bong.
- Jo Hye-joo a Female university student: the character based on Shin Jae-soon (Korean: 신재순).
- Ji Hyun-jun as Ham Dae-yong, a KCIA agent
- Éric Bernard as a French Henchman
- David Pipes as a Member of Hearing Committee 2

== Reception ==
The film was released in Japan on 22 January 2021, under the name KCIA.

The Man Standing Next holds an 80% approval rating on review aggregator website Rotten Tomatoes, based on 20 reviews, with an average of 7.5/10.

=== Favorable response ===
Cary Darling of The Houston Chronicle rated it 4/5, writing: "Stylistically, there are echoes of such notable '70s American political thrillers as Parallax View and The Conversation. Even if you're not sure what's going on at any given moment, it is never less than compelling. As if it weren't known already, "The Man Standing Next" is proof that there's much more to South Korean cinema than Parasite."

=== Critical response ===
In a review for The Guardian, Leslie Felperin noted the film "feels aimed more at a domestic audience" and rated it 3/5. She wrote: "There's a long wait until something really meaty happens, in every sense, but the climactic killing in a restaurant, complete with spluttering arteries and swooping camerawork, is just about worth the wait."

In a review for The Hollywood Reporter, John DeFore wrote: "Though touching on a le Carre-like web of loyalties, ambition and hidden agendas, the film (an adaptation of Kim Choong-Seek's book KCIA Chiefs) is generally less engrossing than that might suggest, only coming to life in the sweaty hours leading up to that murder."

== Awards and nominations ==
Year	Award	Category	Recipient	Result	Ref.
2020	25th Chunsa Film Art Awards	Best Director	Woo Min-ho	Nominated	
2020	25th Chunsa Film Art Awards	Best Actor	Lee Byung-hun	Won	
2020	25th Chunsa Film Art Awards	Best Supporting Actor	Lee Sung-min	Won	
2020	25th Chunsa Film Art Awards	Best Supporting Actor	Lee Hee-joon	Nominated	
2020	25th Chunsa Film Art Awards	Best Supporting Actress	Kim So-jin	Nominated	
2020	56th Baeksang Arts Awards	Best Film	The Man Standing Next	Nominated	
2020	56th Baeksang Arts Awards	Best Director	Woo Min-ho	Nominated	
2020	56th Baeksang Arts Awards	Best Actor	Lee Byung-hun	Won	
2020	56th Baeksang Arts Awards	Best Screenplay	Woo Min-ho & Lee Ji-min	Nominated	
2020	56th Baeksang Arts Awards	Technical Award	Kim Seo-hee (Makeup and Hair)	Won	
2020	29th Buil Film Awards	Best Film	The Man Standing Next	Nominated	
2020	29th Buil Film Awards	Best Director	Woo Min-ho	Nominated	
2020	29th Buil Film Awards	Best Actor	Lee Byung-hun	Won	
2020	29th Buil Film Awards	Best Supporting Actor	Lee Hee-joon	Won	
2020	29th Buil Film Awards	Best Supporting Actress	Kim So-jin	Nominated	
2020	29th Buil Film Awards	Best Screenplay	Woo Min-ho & Lee Ji-min	Nominated	
2020	29th Buil Film Awards	Best Cinematography	Go Rak-sun	Nominated	
2020	29th Buil Film Awards	Best Music	Jo Yeong-wook	Nominated	
2020	29th Buil Film Awards	Best Art Direction	Cho Hwa-sung, Park Gyu-bin	Nominated	
2020	40th Korean Association of Film Critics Awards	Best Film	The Man Standing Next	Won	
2020	40th Korean Association of Film Critics Awards	Top 10 Films	The Man Standing Next	Won	
2020	40th Korean Association of Film Critics Awards	Best Actor	Lee Byung-hun	Won	
2020	14th Asian Film Awards	Best Actor	Lee Byung-hun	Won	
2020	7th Korean Film Producers Association Awards	Best Director	Woo Min-ho	Won	
2020	7th Korean Film Producers Association Awards	Best Art Direction	Cho Hwa-sung, Park Gyu-bin	Won	
2020	Cine 21 Awards	Best Screenplay	Woo Min-ho & Lee Ji-min	Won	
2021	41st Blue Dragon Film Awards	Best Film	The Man Standing Next	Won	
2021	41st Blue Dragon Film Awards	Best Director	Woo Min-ho	Nominated	
2021	41st Blue Dragon Film Awards	Best Leading Actor	Lee Byung-hun	Nominated	
2021	41st Blue Dragon Film Awards	Best Supporting Actor	Lee Sung-min	Nominated	
2021	41st Blue Dragon Film Awards	Best Supporting Actor	Lee Hee-joon	Nominated	
2021	41st Blue Dragon Film Awards	Best Screenplay	Woo Min-ho & Lee Ji-min	Nominated	
2021	41st Blue Dragon Film Awards	Best Cinematography and Lighting	Go Rak-sun: Cinematography; Lee Seung-bin: Lighting	Nominated	
2021	41st Blue Dragon Film Awards	Best Editing	Jeong Ji-eun	Nominated	
2021	41st Blue Dragon Film Awards	Best Art Direction	Cho Hwa-sung, Park Gyu-bin	Nominated	
2021	41st Blue Dragon Film Awards	Best Music	Jo Yeong-wook	Nominated	
2021	41st Blue Dragon Film Awards	Technical Award	Kwak Tae-yong, Hwang Hyo-kyun (Makeup)	Nominated	

== See also ==
- List of submissions to the 93rd Academy Awards for Best International Feature Film
- List of South Korean submissions for the Academy Award for Best International Feature Film
