= 5th Republic (TV series) =

South Korean TV series

- Promotional poster
- Also known as: The Fifth Republic
- Hangul: 제5공화국
- Hanja: 第5共和國
- RR: Je5gonghwaguk
- MR: Che5konghwaguk
- Genre: Period drama; Docudrama; Biopic
- Written by: Yoo Jung-soo
- Directed by: Im Tae-woo; Kim Sang-rae
- Starring: Lee Deok-hwa; Seo In-seok; Hong Hak-pyo; Lee Jin-woo; Cha Kwang-soo; Lee Jae-yong
- Narrated by: Ahn Ji-hwan
- Theme music composer: Ahn Ji-hong
- Opening theme: Deus Non Vult
- Ending theme: Deus Non Vult
- Composer: Ahn Ji-hong
- Country of origin: South Korea
- Original language: Korean
- No. of seasons: 1
- No. of episodes: 41

Production
- Executive producer: Shin Ho-gyun

Original release
- Network: MBC TV
- Release: April 23 – September 1, 2005

5th Republic (Korean: 제5공화국; RR: Je5gonghwaguk) is a 2005 South Korean drama television series that aired on MBC from April 23 to September 1, 2005, on Saturdays and Sundays at 21:40 (KST) for 41 episodes. It takes place during the 1981–1988 Fifth Republic of South Korea under the dictatorship of President Chun Doo-hwan. It follows his rise to power through a military coup to his downfall after a series of democratic movements, including the Gwangju uprising and the June Democratic Uprising.

It is the fifth installment of the Republic series, which began with the 1st Republic TV series in 1981.

== Cast ==
=== 5th Republic core force ===
- Lee Deok-hwa as Chun Doo-hwan
- Kim Young-ran as Rhee Soon-ja
- Seo In-seok as Roh Tae-woo
- Song Ok-sook as Kim Ok-suk
- Lee Jin-woo as Heo Hwa-pyong
- Cha Kwang-soo as Heo Sam-soo
- Lee Jae-yong as Lee Hak-bong
- Hong Hak-pyo as Chang Se-dong
- Lee Hee-do as Huh Moon-do
- Jung Han-heon as Kwon Jung-dal

=== Key figures in the 10.26 incident ===
- Kim Hyung-il as Kim Jae-gyu
- Jung Ho-keun as Cha Ji-chul
- Kim Sung-joon as Park Heung-ju
- Kim Hyuk as Park Seon-ho
- Shin Dong-mi as Shim Soo-bong
- Jo Mi-na as Shin Jae-soon

=== Key figures in the 4th Republic ===
- Lee Chang-hwan as Park Chung Hee
- Lee Jung-gil as Kim Jong-pil
- Park In-hwan as Jeong Seung-hwa
- Yang Mi-kyung as Yuk Young-soo

==== Others in the 4th Republic ====
- Na Sung-kyoon as Kim Gye-won
- Go Jung-min as Park Geun-hye
- Jeon Su-ji as Park Geun-ryeong
- Kim Nam-gil as Park Ji-man

=== Key figures in the 5th Republic ===
- Im Dong-jin as Kim Dae-jung
- Kim Yong-gun as Kim Young-sam

=== Other People ===
- Yoon Seung-won as Jeong Ho-yong
- Kim Byung-gi as No Shin-young
- Jung Sun-il as Kim Jae-ik
- Kim Won-bae as Lee Jong-won
- Choi Jin-hong as Lee Jong-nam
- Soon Dong-woon as Lee Won-jo
- Moon Hoe-won as Hwang Young-shi
- Lee Jung-hoon as Park Se-jik

==== People associated with the "3 Kims" ====
- Yeon Woon-kyung as Lee Hui-ho
- Won Jong-rye as Park Young-ok
- Hyun Sook-hee as Son Myung-soon

==== 12.12 Military Insurrection ====
- Choi Bum-ho as Lee Soon-gil
- Kim Ki-hyeon as Jang Tae-wan
- Han Young-soo as Ha So-gon
- Min Wook as Jung Byung-joo
- Jung Jong-hyun as Yoon Heung-ki

==== Gwangju Uprising ====
- Jung Yoo-chan as Park Nam-sun
- Son Jong-bum as Lee Chang-suk
- Uhm Dong-hwan as Kim Sung-hak

==== National Assembly ====
- Im Byung-ki as Lee Yong-goo
- Kim Ik-tae as Hwang Nak-joo
- Lee Dae-ro as Lee Boo-young
- Yang Young-joon as Lee Min-woo
- Kim Jin-ho as Lee Taek-don

==== Choi Kyu-ha government ====
- Kim Sung-kyum as Choi Kyu-hah
- Shin Choong-shik as Shin Hyun-hwak
- Kim Jung-hak as Yoon Sang-won
- Park Kyu-jum as Choi Kwang-soo
- Han Chun-il as Ahn Jong-hoon

==== Others ====
- Lee Seung-hyung as Park Chul-un
- Lee Han-wi as Kim Yong-nam
- Lee Ki-young as Choi Se-chang
- Park Pal-young as Kim Shin-ok
- Kim Yong-hee as Shim Jae-chul
- Lee Won-yong as Kim Je-jin
- Lee Chul-min as Kim Dong-gyum
- Lee Il-woong as Ryūzō Sejima
- Park Young-tae as Yoon Heung-jung
- Son Young-soon as Kim Sung-soon
- Kim Dong-suk as Heo Kyung-man
- Lee Jong-goo as Yoon Bo-sun
- Kim Gun-ho as Bang Woo-young
- Lee Charm as Robert G. Brewster
- Na Jae-kyun as Kim Ki-suk
- Han In-soo as Yang Jung-mo
- Kim Jae-kwon as Kim Geun-soo
- Lee Suk-goo as Choi Joon-moon
- Shin Jong-hoon as Jung Dong-nyun

==== Extended cast, cameos, and special appearances ====
- Choi Yoon-joon (ep. 3, 36)
- Lee Joong-yul (ep. 4)
- Park Hyung-sun (ep. 6)
- Yum Jung-goo (ep. 7-9)
- Maeng Bong-hak (ep. 11)
- Go Jin-myung (ep. 11)
- Kim Kwang-in (ep. 23)
- Baek Yoon-heum (ep. 26)
- Kwon Kwan-oh (ep. 27, 29)
- Son Yoo-kyung (ep. 31)
- Song Seung-yong (ep. 36)
- Lee Jong-rae
- Baek Joon-ki
- Son Min-woo
- Jung Dae-hong
- Go Yong-hwa
- Lee Seung-hoon
- Kang Chul-sung
- Joo Hyun

== Production ==
Seventeen former politicians and key aides of Chun Doo-hwan's (including Chang Se-dong, his former chief-of-staff; Hur Hwa-pyong, lawmaker; Jeong Ho-yong, former Army Chief of Staff; and Lee Hak-bong, former vice director of the Korea Central Intelligence Agency) attempted to halt the drama in pre-production, and failing that, sent a statement to the producers with claims of historical distortion and threatened legal action unless the script was changed. The production refused, with producer-director Im Tae-woo saying that they tried their best to maintain objectivity by basing their script on historical records and information that they collected for three years, such as Supreme Court rulings, and other hearing documents and news reports at that time.

== Reception ==
=== Critical and public response ===
The Fifth Republic was a politically and socially turbulent era in the country's history, which generated controversy for the drama series.

It was so popular in Japan that even Shinzō Abe watched it and people started cosplaying the characters and even fanzines were created.

In 2023, as the film 12.12: The Day became popular, people became interested in other works, such as this work which dealt with the Coup d'état of December Twelfth.

== Music ==
Ahn Ji-hong wrote the music. In the past, he also participated in MBC's drama Republic series, 3rd Republic and 4th Republic. He tried to create powerful music to capture the diverse and ironic aspects of the drama.

The insert songs included "That Person Back Then" (Korean: 그때 그 사람; RR: Geuttae geu saram) of Sim Soo-bong and "I Love You" (Korean: 사랑해; RR: Saranghae) of Lana. Et. Rospo (Korean: 라나에로스포; RR: Ranaeroseupo; lit. 'Frog & Toad'), which came out during the real-life October 26 incident.

=== Soundtracks ===
Released on July 8, 2005
No.	Title	Lyrics	Music	Artist	Length
1.	"5th Republic (Ending); Deus Non Vult (Ending)" (제5공화국 (엔딩); Deus Non Vult (엔딩))	Ahn Ji-hong	Ahn Ji-hong	Various Artists	1:04
2.	"5th Republic (Opening); Deus Non Vult (Opening)" (제5공화국 (오프닝); Deus Non Vult (오프닝))	Ahn Ji-hong	Ahn Ji-hong	Various Artists	0:52
Total length:					1:56

In particular, the theme song, Deus Non Vult, is taken from the Latin meaning that humans can forgive history, but "God will not." and used the expression as a parody of Deus vult. The powerful sound achieved by combining the choir's thick sound and rapid repetition with brass and metal has a modern feel.
