= Syngman Rhee and Kim Ku =

Korean-language biography by Son Sae-il

- Author: Son Se-il
- Language: Korean
- Subject: Syngman Rhee and Kim Ku
- Genre: Political biography
- Publisher: Monthly Chosun (original serial run); Chosun News Press (compilation books)
- Publication date: August 2001 – July 2013 (serially); July 2015 (compilation books)
- Publication place: South Korea

Yi Seungman gwa Gim Gu (Korean: 이승만과 김구), title translatable as Syngman Rhee and Kim Ku, is a Korean-language biography by South Korean politician and journalist Son Se-il. It covers two major figures in modern Korean history: the first president of South Korea Syngman Rhee and independence activist Kim Ku. It was first published serially in the Monthly Chosun magazine from August 2001 to July 2013 in 111 installments. Son took two breaks in the middle of publication in order to conduct more research. In July 2015, the publications were recompiled into a 7 volume book set.

== Description ==
Son is a former politician and journalist from South Korea. He published what has retroactively been seen as a predecessor to the biography in 1970, a one-volume work of the same title. As the Cold War ended in the 1990s, Son witnessed more information about both figures being declassified and published. He reportedly felt that he should cover the new information and research, and decided to write this biography.

The biography is considered to be extensive and exhaustive, and covers numerous events, publications, and letters relevant to the lives of both figures. The biography is structured chronologically and in parallel, with information about both figures interwoven in each volume. It includes significant discussion of relevant geopolitical conditions, and often compares and contrasts the reactions of each of its subjects to various events. The biography ends at the year 1950; after Kim Ku's assassination.

The biography sometimes takes positions that have historically have been considered unflattering to both figures. Son said of them: (Note: "이승만과 김구는 오늘날의 한국을 만든 대표적 두 지도자이자 20세기 한국 민족주의의 가장 큰 두 유산. [...] 그 유산 가운데는 물론 빚도 있다.")

Syngman Rhee and Kim Ku are the two leaders who created the modern [South] Korea, and the two greatest legacies of [South] Korean nationalism in the 20th century. [...] Of course, amidst their legacies are unpaid debts.

Each of its seven volumes contains around 800 pages; a writer for The Chosun Ilbo noted that if one read 100 pages of the biography every day, it would take around two months to complete it. Part 1, consisting of volumes 1 and 2, covers events prior to the 1919 March First Movement. Part 2 (vol. 3 and 4) covers the events of 1919 to 1945. Part 3 (vol. 6 and 7) covers 1945 to 1950.

As of May 2024, the original serially published version of the biography is available on the Monthly Chosun website for free reading. The published biography is reportedly significantly revised and improved from the original serial publication.

== See also ==
- Spit on My Grave – a biography of President Park Chung Hee that was also published serially in the Monthly Chosun
