= Namsanui bujangdeul =

1992 book by Kim Chung-sik

- Cover of the 2nd edition
- Author: Kim Chung-sik
- Language: Korean
- Subject: South Korean history
- Publication date: November 1992
- Publication place: South Korea
- ISBN: 978-8-970-90033-9

Namsanui bujangdeul (Korean: 남산의 부장들; lit. 'Chiefs of Namsan') is a 1992 non-fiction book by journalist and academic Kim Chung-sik. It focuses on the rule of South Korean president Park Chung Hee, especially the activities of the Korean Central Intelligence Agency (KCIA).

It was originally published serially in the newspaper The Dong-A Ilbo from 1990 to 1992. This work was then compiled into a book. The serial continued publication until 1994, although under a different author, Lee Do-seong. That was compiled into a third volume of the book in 1993.

In 2020, a dramatized film based on the book, The Man Standing Next, was released.

== Synopsis ==
The book covers the rule of South Korean leader and president Park Chung Hee, from his rise to power in the 1961 May 16 coup to the aftermath of his assassination in 1979. It especially focuses on the origins and activities of the Korean Central Intelligence Agency (KCIA) and key people in that organization. It argues that the KCIA had far-reaching impact in South Korean society, rigging elections, suppressing dissenters and Park's enemies, and other such illegal activities.

== Development and publication ==
Kim Chung-sik is a South Korean journalist and now professor at Gachon University. He began working in The Dong-A Ilbo as a journalist in 1978. During the course of his career, he accumulated a large number of sources about the KCIA and the Park administration and developed an interest in writing a book about those topics. Beginning in 1988, he began proposing that The Dong-A Ilbo allow the publication of such a series on the topic; his request was finally accepted in 1990.

The series ran from August 10, 1990 to October 10, 1992 in 112 installments. According to Kim, in one instance, the Cheong Wa Dae (South Korean presidential office) under president Roh Tae-woo considered arresting Kim and halting the publication, as they feared he was leaking sensitive classified information. However, Kim was eventually informed by government insiders that this never came to pass, as they felt it would cause an international controversy and damage the reputation of the government. In November 1992, a two-part book based on the series until that point was published.

On October 17, 1992, starting from the 113th installment, journalist Lee Do-seong (이도성; 李度晟) took over publication of the serial and focused on the rise of Chun Doo-hwan. This was published as a third volume of Namsanui bujangdeul in December 1993. In 1997, Lee published a separate book based on his work on the serial. It was entitled Chun Doo-hwan's Coup d'Etat (전두환의 쿠데타; 全斗煥兵變靑瓦臺).

A revised edition of Kim's work on the series was published in November 2012. That edition is 878 pages long.

== Reception and related works ==
The initial 1992 publication of the book was an immediate success. It went on to sell 520,000 copies.

The book was adapted into a film The Man Standing Next (film has the same Korean-language title as this book) that was released in 2020. According to Kim, the film adaptation came about because the director of the film, Woo Min-ho, had read the book around the time of its original publication as a college student and had been captivated by it ever since.

In 2022, Kim published a similarly-titled work 5gong Namsanui bujangdeul (5공 남산의 부장들; lit. 'Fifth Republic Chiefs of Namsan'), which focuses on the rule of Park's successor Chun Doo-hwan and the KCIA's activities during that time.

== See also ==
- Spit on My Grave – a biography of Park also originally published serially
