= Oh Jang-seop =

South Korean politician (1947–2026)

- 오장섭

Member of the National Assembly of South Korea
- In office 24 July 1997 – 29 May 2004
- In office 30 May 1992 – 29 May 1996

Minister of Construction and Transport
- In office 26 March 2001 – 22 August 2001
- Preceded by: Kim Yon-ki
- Succeeded by: Kim Yong-chae

Personal details
- Born: 26 March 1947 Sapgyo, southern Korea
- Died: 17 July 2026 (aged 79)
- Party: NKP; ULD
- Education: Hanyang University (BS, MS)
- Occupation: Businessman

Oh Jang-seop (Korean: 오장섭; 26 March 1947 – 17 July 2026) was a South Korean politician. A member of the New Korea Party and the United Liberal Democrats, he served in the National Assembly from 1992 to 1996 and from 1997 to 2004. He was also Minister of Construction and Transport from March to August 2001.

Oh died on 17 July 2026, at the age of 79.
