= The President's Last Bang =

- Theatrical release poster
- Hangul: 그때 그사람들
- RR: Geuttae geusaramdeul
- MR: Kŭttae kŭsaramdŭl
- Directed by: Im Sang-soo
- Written by: Im Sang-soo
- Produced by: Shin Chul
- Starring: Baek Yoon-sik; Han Suk-kyu; Song Jae-ho
- Cinematography: Kim Woo-hyung
- Edited by: Lee Eun-soo
- Music by: Kim Hong-jib
- Production company: MK Pictures
- Distributed by: CJ Entertainment
- Release date: October 14, 2005
- Running time: 102 minutes
- Country: South Korea
- Languages: Korean; Japanese
- Budget: $4.5 million
- Box office: $6,287,722

The President's Last Bang: (Korean: 그때 그사람들; RR: Geuttae geusaramdeul) (Note: The original title (in English, "The People of Those Days" or "Those People Back Then") refers to a famous Korean song of a similar title – "That Man of those Days". According to official sources, this song was performed by Sim Soo-bong during the party the night of Park's assassination. In the movie, however, Sim Soo-bong is summoned to perform Japanese enka songs.) is a 2005 satirical black comedy film by South Korean director Im Sang-soo about the events leading to and the aftermath of the assassination of Park Chung Hee, then the South Korean President, by his close friend and Korean Intelligence Agency director Kim Jae-kyu.

The film's portrayal of Park was a subject of controversy, leading to a lawsuit against the film's makers by Park Chung Hee's only son, Park Ji-man. In 2005, a ruling by the Seoul Central Court ordered that 3 minutes and 50 seconds of documentary footage (mostly of demonstrations) be censored out of the film. In response, the director had the excised footage replaced with a blank screen for its running time. During its theatrical run, both nationally and internationally, only the censored version was shown.

The ruling was appealed, and in August 2006 overturned, with the court issuing the following statement: "We must broadly confirm the right of free expression concerning the depiction of public historical figures." The court also concluded that several scenes were an unjust smear against the former president and ordered MK Pictures, the production company that financed the film, to pay President Park's family 100 million won (roughly US$105,000).

Almost the entirety of the film focuses on the few hours before and after Park's assassination on October 26, 1979. Undoubtedly the most controversial aspect of the film is its portrayal of Park: in the film, he is shown to be a cowardly libertine who is seen having late-night drinking parties, pawing young women, and in particular having much admiration for Japanese culture to the point of occasionally speaking Japanese himself. The memory of Japanese occupation remains fresh in the minds of many South Koreans; this was seen to imply Park had affection for—if not association with—Korea's former colonial rulers.

== Plot ==
At a luxurious brothel in South Korea, KCIA Chief Agent Ju deals with the mother of a young woman who was one of South Korean president Park Chung Hee's playmates, who has come with her daughter to offer her again to the President, by interrogating and intimidating them.

KCIA director Kim gets scolded by a doctor about his drinking, a direct result of having to attend President Park's drinking parties. Scenes of various officials and low officers making their way to a heavily guarded safehouse follow, including Chief Agent Ju procuring an attractive young woman and the famous enka and trot singer Sim Soo-bong for the party.

During the dinner, President Park, his personal bodyguard, Cha Ji-cheol, Director Kim, Chief Secretary Yang (appointed to the post to be Park's drinking buddy, and portrayed as a total sycophant) discuss how to deal with demonstrators, with Cha berating Kim for not being repressive enough. Kim, having been agitated the entire day, decides then to kill Park, and hatches the plan with Chief Agent Ju and KCIA Colonel Min.

Director Kim returns to the party, shoots Cha (who is unarmed) and Park, each with a single shot before jamming the pistol. Soon thereafter, Agent Ju and Col. Min and a few minions kill the president's personal bodyguards and secure the building. Kim comes back with another gun, finishes off Cha, and gives Park his personal opinion before executing him with a shot to the head.

They move to make the scene resemble an ambush by North Korean forces, and Kim uses the political fear and tension to his advantage while convening a Cabinet Council. Later, Director Kim and Colonel Min meet with the Army higher-ups to sell them their version of events, but Chief Secretary Yang gets to them first and tells what really happened.

With every agency under its own authority and the possibility of inter-agency war looming, the Army arrests Director Kim, leaving Agent Yu and Colonel Min helpless and confused. Realizing their fate, they call their families to say goodbye.

Prime Minister Choi Kyu-hah ascends to the presidency, and the fates of those involved at the party—most of them executed—are listed.

== Cast ==
- Baek Yoon-sik as KCIA Director Kim Jae-kyu
- Han Suk-kyu as KCIA Chief Agent Joo (based on Park Seon-ho)
- Song Jae-ho as President Park Chung Hee
- Kim Eung-soo as KCIA Colonel Min (based on Park Heung-ju)
- Kim Yoon-ah as Singer (based on Sim Soo-bong)
- Lee Soo-mi as Chief Agent Joo's wife
- Jo Eun-ji as Female banquet guest
- Jung Won-joong as Chief of Presidential Security Service Cha Ji-chul
- Kwon Byung-gil as Chief of Staff to President Park

Director Im Sang-soo makes an appearance as a doctor, and Youn Yuh-jung makes an uncredited appearance as an assault victim's mother

== Release ==
It screened in the Directors' Fortnight section of the 2005 Cannes Film Festival.

The President's Last Bang was restored to its original cut and screened in its entirety from October 13 to October 18, 2006, at the 11th Pusan International Film Festival.
