= Seonu Hwi =

South Korean writer (1922–1986)

- Born: 선우휘; January 3, 1922; Chongju, Korea, Empire of Japan
- Died: June 12, 1986 (aged 64)
- Writing career
- Language: Korean

Korean name
- Hangul: 선우휘
- Hanja: 鮮于輝
- RR: Seonu Hwi
- MR: Sŏnu Hwi

Seonu Hwi (Korean: 선우휘; January 3, 1922 – June 12, 1986) was a South Korean author and novelist.

== Life ==
Seonu Hwi was born on January 3, 1922, in Chongju, Korea, Empire of Japan. A writer poet, journalist, soldier and philosopher he also fought in the Korean War from 1950 to 1952. poet, journalist, soldier and philosopher. He was a famous realist and anticommunist writer and journalist. Seonu Hwi graduated from Gyeongseong Teachers School in 1944. He worked as a reporter for Chosun Ilbo before enlisting in the army in 1949 as an information and education officer. He made his literary debut in 1955 with the publication of his story "Ghost" (Gwisin).

== Work ==
The Korea Literature Translation Institute summarized Seonu Hwi's work:

Behavioral humanism, or the expression of an active will in dire situations, characterizes Sunwoo Hwi's literary world. "Flowers of Fire" (Bulkkot), for which he first gained recognition, features a man who overcomes his escapist mentality to embrace the spirit of resistance. As revealed in "Flowers of Fire" as well as in the novels Flagman Without a Flag (Gitbal eomneun gisu) and The Finale of the Chase (Chujeogui pinalle), the will to act is rooted in respect for mankind and desire to oppose dehumanization. For Sunwoo Hwi, the responsibility of intellectuals includes active participation in the affairs of the society and resistance to dehumanization caused by ideological conflicts and social ills. The humanistic approach, however, is overemphasized in works such as Myth of Bush-Clover Village (Ssaritgorui sinhwa), giving the work the feel of an imaginary world removed from contemporary reality. After 1965, Sunwoo Hwi began to evince a more conservative attitude towards the establishment. "Golgotha Without Cross" (Sipjaga eomneun golgoda), "A Thirteen-Year-Old Boy" (Yeol sesarui sonyeon) and "A Funny Story About Funny People" focus on nostalgia for lost childhood homes, and The Jackpot (Nodaji), serialized in Chosun Weekly from 1979 to 1981, is a family chronicle.

== Works in translation ==
- The Mirror (선우휘단편집)

== Works in Korean (partial) ==
- Seonu Hwi munhakjunjip (선우휘 문학전집; 1987)
- Ghost (귀신)
- Fired (화재)
- Manghyang (망향)
- Legend of Saritkgo (싸릿골 신화)

== Awards ==
- Dong-in Literary Award (1957)

== See also ==
- Jo Gap-je
- Ji Man-won
- Jun Won-tchack
