= Son Se-il =

South Korean politician (1935–2024)

- 손세일

Member of the National Assembly of South Korea
- In office 30 May 1992 – 29 May 2000
- Preceded by: Oh Yu-bang
- Succeeded by: Kang In-seop
- Constituency: Eunpyeong A
- In office 11 April 1981 – 12 May 1985
- Preceded by: constituency established
- Succeeded by: Kim Jae-gwang
- Constituency: Seodaemun-gu and Eunpyeong-gu

Personal details
- Born: 10 June 1935 Keishōnan Province, Korea, Empire of Japan
- Died: 17 December 2024 (aged 89)
- Party: DKP; DP; NCNP
- Education: Seoul National University; Indiana University Bloomington; University of Tokyo
- Occupation: Journalist

Son Se-il (Korean: 손세일; 10 June 1935 – 17 December 2024) was a South Korean journalist and politician. A member of the Democratic Korea Party, the Democratic Party, and the National Congress for New Politics, he served in the National Assembly from 1981 to 1985 and again from 1992 to 2000.

He was author of the biography Syngman Rhee and Kim Ku, which was published serially in the Monthly Chosun.

Son died on 17 December 2024, at the age of 89.
