= Spit on My Grave =

Biography of Park Chung Hee by Cho Gab-je

- Author: Cho Gab-je
- Country: South Korea
- Language: Korean
- Genre: Biography
- Publisher: The Chosun Ilbo; Monthly Chosun; Chosun Ilbo Company

Spit on My Grave (Korean: 《내 무덤에 침을 뱉어라》) is a Korean-language biography of South Korean President Park Chung Hee that was written by journalist Cho Gab-je. The biography was first published serially in the newspaper The Chosun Ilbo beginning on October 20, 1997. Publication was moved to the Monthly Chosun at the 564th installment.

The title of the biography is a reference to a quote Park often repeated to journalists who asked about controversies related to him. Park was a military dictator who seized power in a coup and ruled for around 18 years until his assassination. However, during this period he oversaw South Korea's rapid economic growth.

Cho is a significant investigative journalist who led the Monthly Chosun for years. During his career as a journalist, Cho wrote critically about the Park regime on a number of occasions, and was even fired twice for doing so. He became inspired to write the biography after watching news coverage of Park's assassination. While studying Park's life, he professed to moving further to the political right, and by 2008 he regarded Park as the greatest South Korean president of all time.

The biography is considered to be an exhaustive and comprehensive biography of Park. However, Cho has also become increasingly controversial over time. He is considered by others and self-professes to often making inflammatory and far-right remarks. Furthermore, the political right in South Korea is generally considered to have favorable opinions of Park. In spite of this, Spit on My Grave is now generally regarded as an objective biography.

== See also ==
- Namsanui bujangdeul – a book about Park's administration also originally published serially
