= Kim Jae-gyu =

Assassin of South Korean president Park Chung Hee (1924–1980)

Kim Jae-gyu 김재규
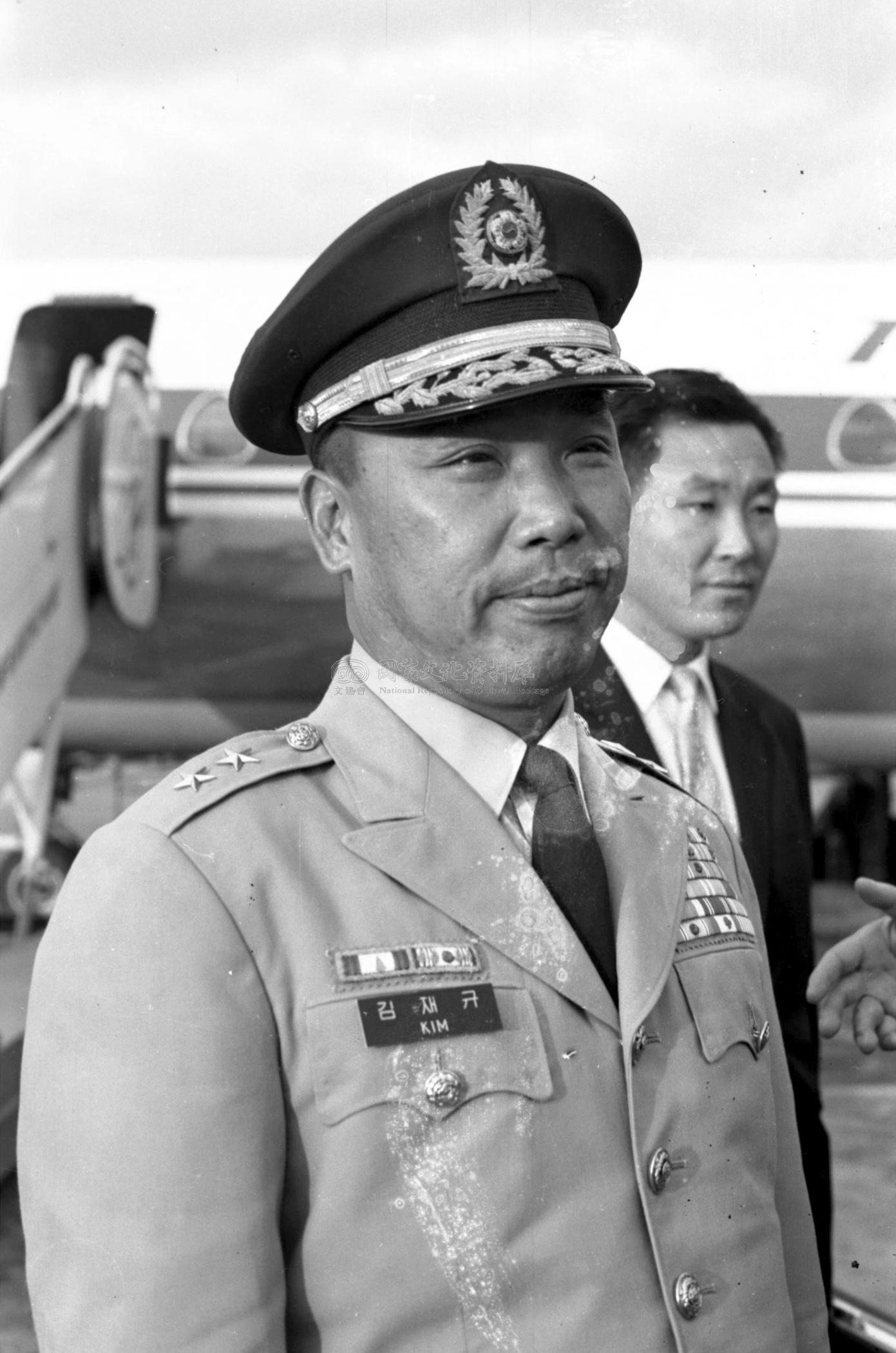
- Kim in Taiwan, 1968

Director of the Korean Central Intelligence Agency
- In office February 4, 1976 – October 26, 1979
- President: Park Chung Hee

Minister of Construction
- In office September 14, 1974 – February 4, 1976
- President: Park Chung-hee

Personal details
- Born: April 9, 1924 Zensan, Korea, Empire of Japan
- Died: May 24, 1980 (aged 56) Seoul Detention Center, Seoul, South Korea
- Cause of death: Execution by hanging
- Resting place: Neungpyeong-dong, Gwangju, Gyeonggi
- Spouse: Kim Young Hee
- Education: Hanyang University graduate Engineering Master; Korea Military Academy
- Occupation: Soldier, Jeongmujik government official
- Religion: Buddhism

Military service
- Allegiance: South Korea
- Branch/service: Republic of Korea Army
- Years of service: 1946–1974
- Rank: Lieutenant General
- Commands: Third Army Group; Army Security Command; Sixth Military District; 6th Division
- Battles/wars: World War II; Korean War

Korean name
- Hangul: 김재규
- Hanja: 金載圭
- RR: Gim Jaegyu
- MR: Kim Chaegyu

Art name
- Hangul: 덕산
- Hanja: 德山
- RR: Deoksan
- MR: Tŏksan

Kim Jae-gyu (Korean: 김재규, April 9, 1924 – May 24, 1980) was a South Korean politician, army lieutenant general and director of the Korean Central Intelligence Agency. He assassinated South Korean President Park Chung Hee on October 26, 1979, and was executed by hanging on May 24, 1980.

He remains a controversial figure with many contradictions: he is regarded by some as a patriot who ended Park's 18-year military dictatorship, and by others as a traitor who killed his longtime benefactor out of personal grievance. For many years, the latter was the prevailing view, but later revelations in the early 2000s about Kim's relationship with some leaders of the democracy movement prompted a reevaluation in some circles.

== Early life ==
Kim was born in Gumi, North Gyeongsang Province, Korea. He is the 27th generation descendant of Kim Moon-gi (김문기;金文起) who was the civil minister (문신;文臣), the loyalist (충신;忠臣) of King Danjong, and the one of Samjungsin (삼중신;三重臣) during the Joseon period. He graduated from Gyeongbuk University in 1945 and became a middle school teacher until the newly independent South Korean government established its military and created the Korea Military Academy, then called Joseon Defense Academy. He graduated from the Joseon Defense Academy in December 1946, the same year as Park Chung Hee, and from Army College in 1952. He served as a regimental commander in 1954 and as vice-president of the Army College in 1957, where Kim Gye-won was the president at the time. Later Kim Gye-won became Chief Presidential Secretary to President Park and was present at the scene of assassination. In 1961, when Park Chung Hee staged a military coup to seize power, Kim did not participate and was suspected of being a counterrevolutionary. He was temporarily detained until he was released on Park's order. He served Park's military dictatorship from then until his assassination of Park in 1979.

== Park's dictatorship ==
During Park's dictatorship, Kim was appointed as the commander of 6th Division in 1963. When there was a widespread demonstration against the Korean-Japanese treaty in 1964, which Park pursued in secret and was widely regarded as disadvantageous to Korean fishermen, Kim's Division was dispatched to Seoul to subdue student demonstrations. Kim's handling of the situation was said to have earned Park's trust and favor. On the other hand, it is also said that Kim refused to involve the Army in the arrest of civilians and left that task to the police, ordering his troops to occupy themselves with the cleanup of streets and the university campus. Afterward, he commanded the Sixth Military District in 1966, the Army Security Command in 1968, and the Third Army Group in 1971. While he was the commander of Army Security Command, a military organ whose chief function was to safeguard the dictatorship, Park ran for a third term in the 1971 presidential election. Kim persuaded Park to promise voters it would be his last term. He also opposed the formation of Hanahoe, a secret organization formed by Chun Doo-hwan and other young officers who took personal oaths of loyalty to Park and the group itself above all else, and criticized it as a private army. Eventually, Hanahoe staged a military coup under Chun's leadership after Park's assassination to seize power and drove out the older generation of military generals.

While Kim was the commander of the Third Army Group in Kang-won Province, Park declared national emergency and martial law, dismissed the National Assembly and prohibited all political activities in October 1972. The purpose was to ratify the Yushin Constitution of 1972, which (a) abolished direct vote for presidential election and replaced it with an indirect voting system involving delegates, (b) allotted one third of the National Assembly seats to the president, (c) gave the president the authority to issue emergency decrees and suspend the Constitution, (d) gave the president the authority to appoint all judges and dismiss the National Assembly and (e) repealed a term limit to presidency. In the 1971 election, Park had nearly lost to opposition leader Kim Dae-jung despite spending ten percent of the national budget on his reelection campaign. The Yushin Constitution was designed to guarantee his dictatorship for life. Indeed, Park was later reelected president by a unanimous vote of approximately 2,000 delegates, who all became delegates themselves with Park's approval. According to Kim's subordinate officers at Third Army Group, Kim did not hide his displeasure at learning of the Yushin Constitution.

== Yushin Constitution ==
After his arrest, Kim wrote in Chinese calligraphy that it took seven years to accomplish his resolution, suggesting that the Yushin Constitution turned him against Park. At his trial, he claimed that he planned to detain Park if he were to visit the Third Army Group base on his annual tour of army groups and force his resignation. According to Third Army Group operations chief of staff Oh Soo-choon, who was also Kim's brother-in-law, Kim installed fences around a small building in the base and set it up so that it would prevent exit from within rather than entry from outside.

More significantly, Kim appears to have had a close relationship with Jang Jun-ha, widely respected leader of the democracy movement as a former Liberation Army officer, opposition lawmaker, and publisher of the monthly journal World of Ideology. According to Jang Ho-kweon, Jang's eldest son and current publisher of the journal, Jang told him that Kim was a patriotic soldier whom he would one day work with for democracy. In 1979, Kim told his lawyer that his first attempt to assassinate Park was on September 14, 1974, when he was appointed Construction Minister. A newsreel of this event shows something protruding in Kim's pocket when he shook hands with Park. According to the Reverend Yi Hae-hak, who was imprisoned with Jang Jun-ha when Jang was sentenced to 15 years for creating a petition campaign against the Yushin Constitution, Jang knew of Kim's plan to assassinate Park and was very disappointed when it did not take place, saying to himself, "Is it that great to be a minister?" After Jang died under suspicious circumstances while climbing a mountain in 1975, Kim secretly provided financial assistance to Jang's family. When Kim became KCIA director in 1976, he told Jang's son with deep regret that Jang's death was not accidental as officially announced, but that the regime was involved.

According to Cardinal Kim Sou-hwan, another leading figure in democracy movement, Kim (then KCIA deputy director) came to see him whenever there was political crisis. In 1975, he asked Cardinal Kim to speak with President Park to come up with the "third way," that is, to somehow amend the Yushin Constitution in a way acceptable to Park. According to Cardinal Kim, Kim compared President Park to "a sick patient" who needed weak medicine initially. Kim believed that the Catholic cardinal was the only person who could speak frankly to Park without repercussion and was disappointed when the talk was essentially fruitless. Kim's association with two key figures of the democracy movement, Jang Jun-ha and Cardinal Kim Sou-hwan, led some to reconsider Kim's motive in assassinating Park.

As Construction Minister (1974–1976), Kim promoted the entry of Korean construction companies into Saudi Arabia, increasing South Korean exports to the Middle East twenty-fold, from $45 million in 1973 to $900 million in 1976, making Saudi Arabia the fourth most important overseas market, and helping South Korea weather the 1973 oil crisis.

== KCIA Director ==
On February 4, 1976, Kim was summoned by Park and was appointed as the director of the Korean Central Intelligence Agency (KCIA), one of the most powerful and feared positions under Park's dictatorship. The KCIA was created in 1961 to coordinate both international and domestic intelligence activities including those of the military with primary aim of combating communism and North Korea. Since then, it was also used to suppress any domestic opposition to Park's regime using its broad powers to wiretap, arrest, and detain suspects without a court order. The KCIA was responsible for widespread violations of human rights in South Korea, engaging in torture, political murder, and kidnapping. It was also heavily involved in behind-the-scene political maneuverings to weaken the opposition parties using bribery, blackmail, threats, arrest, and/or torture of opposition lawmakers. Later Kim claimed that he did not want the position but thought that it would give him the best chance to persuade President Park and reform the Yushin system.

Kim's tenure as the KCIA director has many contradictions. On one hand, Kim asked Park to lift the Ninth Emergency Decree at least three times, which punished any criticism of the Yushin Constitution with a prison term of at least one year, until it was finally replaced with the Tenth Emergency Decree, which relaxed many restrictions of the Ninth Decree. He also released many activists and students who had been arrested under the Ninth Decree. Declassified U.S. diplomatic cables revealed that Kim was considered an unusual KCIA director who often spoke of democracy, and one of the more approachable figures who often carried Washington's messages on human rights to Park.

On the other hand, Kim was responsible for KCIA activities that took place during his tenure including the assassination of former KCIA director Kim Hyong-uk, political sabotage of the opposing New Democratic Party (NDP)'s internal election and the violent arrest of female workers of a wig company YH Trade. Nearly 200 women who worked for YH Trade held a sit-in demonstrations at the NDP headquarters when 2,000 policemen stormed the NDP headquarters on August 11, 1979. In the process, one female worker fell to her death and 52 people including 10 workers, 30 NDP members, and 12 journalists were injured, some requiring hospitalization. Furthermore, KCIA Deputy Director Kim Jeong-Seop and Kim Gye-won testified in their trial after Park's assassination that Kim pursued firm action in the YH case, over the objection of subordinates, and that Kim wanted stronger measures than the Ninth Decree allowed. However, their claims are not thought to be credible since some other testimonies are demonstrably untrue and they needed to distance themselves from Kim.

== 1979 regime troubles ==
The last year of Park's rule was particularly turbulent with increasing opposition from the NDP, which was emboldened after winning the 1978 election by 1.1%, despite Park's complete control of media, money, and all institutions of the government. Because of the Yushin Constitution, which allowed Park to appoint one third of National Assembly seats, Park's Democratic Republican Party (DRP) remained in power. In May 1979, Kim Young-sam was elected as the chairman of the NDP, despite intense behind-the-scene maneuverings by KCIA to back Yi Chul-seung, a more pliable candidate. Under Kim Young-sam's leadership, the NDP took the hardline policy of never compromising or cooperating with Park until the repeal of Yushin Constitution, and took on direct confrontation in many issues, especially the aforementioned YH Trade case. After a violent arrest, Kim Young-sam warned that Park's murderous regime would soon collapse in the most wretched manner. Park was determined to remove Kim from the political scene like imprisoned Kim Dae-joong. In September 1979, the KCIA worked behind the scene to entice three NDP members to challenge Kim's election as NDP chairmanship in the court on technicality, and the court obliged by ordering the suspension of Kim's NDP chairmanship.

The political tension intensified further when Kim Young-sam gave an interview to New York Times reporter Henry Stokes in which he called on the United States to make a choice between the military dictatorship and the Korean people and stop supporting Park's regime. Park ordered Kim Young-sam's expulsion from the National Assembly, which Kim Jae-gyu feared to be a disastrous path. On October 3, 1979, Kim Jae-gyu met Kim Young-sam, hoping to find a way to avoid such development. Having asked a reluctant Kim Young-sam to come to the KCIA "for the sake of the country", Kim Jae-gyu warned that Park's hostility toward him had reached a point where it might not end with just expulsion or arrest and literally begged Kim Young-sam to just say that there was miscommunication with the interview. According to Kim Young-sam, when he refused, Kim Jae-gyu said it would bring misfortune to the country, Kim Young-sam, and Park. Indeed, Kim Young-sam's expulsion from the National Assembly the next day led all 66 NDP lawmakers to submit their resignation to the National Assembly en masse and the United States to recall its ambassador to South Korea in protest. On October 16, uprisings broke out in Kim Young-sam's hometown of Busan, South Korea's second-largest city, resulting in arson of 30 police stations over several days. It was the largest demonstration since the days of President Syngman Rhee and spread to nearby Masan on October 19 and other cities, with students and citizens calling for repeal of the Yushin Constitution. Kim Jae-gyu went to Busan to investigate the situation and found that the demonstrations were not riots by some college students, but more like a "popular uprising joined by regular citizens" to resist the regime. He warned Park that the uprisings would spread to five other largest cities including Seoul. Park said that he himself would give an order to fire upon demonstrators if the situation got worse.

=== Rivalry between Kim and Cha ===
Kim's position, already under stress of the series of political crises of 1979, was further complicated by his rivalry with Cha Ji-cheol, chief of the Presidential Security Service, as well as a worsening relationship with Park. The rivalry stemmed largely from Cha's increasing encroachment into KCIA turf and arrogant behavior that belittled Kim Jae-gyu in public. Almost universally disliked and feared, Cha served Park in close proximity since 1974 and became his favorite and most trusted adviser in the process. Cha appropriated tanks, helicopters and troops from the Army so that the presidential security apparatus had a division-level firepower under Cha's direct command. Furthermore, he began to engage in political maneuverings with Park's blessing, which resulted in frequent clash with the KCIA. In the NDP's election for its chairman in 1979, KCIA backed Yi Chul-seung to prevent the election of hardliner Kim Young-sam, but Cha Ji-chul interfered in KCIA's political sabotage with his own behind-scene maneuverings. When Kim Young-sam was elected as the NDP chairman, Cha laid the blame on KCIA, which infuriated Kim. Later Cha pushed for Kim Young-sam's expulsion from the National Assembly, which Kim Jae-gyu feared to be a disastrous development. Cha easily bested his opponent as his hardline approach was favored by Park, and he blamed worsening development on Kim Jae-gyu's weak leadership of KCIA at every opportunity. As Cha came to control the scheduling of Park's meetings and briefings and thus access to the president, KCIA briefings, which were usually the first business in the morning, were pushed down to afternoons. By October, there were wide rumors that Kim Jae-gyu would be soon replaced as KCIA director.

== Assassination of Park Chung-hee ==
On the day of assassination, Park and his entourage visited ribbon-cutting ceremonies for a dam in Sap-gyeo-cheon and a KBS TV transmitting station in Dang-jin. Kim Jae-gyu was expected to accompany him since the TV station was under KCIA jurisdiction, but Cha blocked him from riding in the same helicopter with President Park. Kim angrily excused himself from the trip.

After the trip, Park instructed the KCIA to prepare for one of his numerous banquets—on average there were ten per month according to KCIA Chief Agent Park Seon-ho, one of the conspirators—at a KCIA safe house in Gungjeong-dong, Jongno-gu, Seoul. It was to be attended by Park, Kim Jae-gyu, Cha, Chief Presidential Secretary Kim Gye-won, and two young women—rising singer Shim Soo-bong and a college student named Shin Jae-soon. When Kim Jae-gyu was notified of the banquet, he called Korean Army Chief of Staff Jeong Seung-hwa 15 minutes later to invite him to the KCIA safe house and arranged to have him dine with KCIA Deputy Director Kim Jeong-seop in a nearby KCIA building in the same compound. Just before the dinner, Kim Jae-gyu told Chief Presidential Secretary Kim Gye-won that he would get rid of Cha. It is not clear whether Kim Gye-won misheard or misunderstood Kim Jae-gyu, or if he ignored his words.

During the dinner, volatile political issues including demonstrations in Busan and the opposition leader Kim Young-sam were discussed with Park, with Chief Cha taking a hardline and Kim Jae-gyu calling for moderate measures, while Chief Presidential Secretary Kim was trying to steer the topic of discussion to small talk. Park rebuked Kim Jae-gyu for not being repressive enough in dealing with protesters and Kim Young-sam, whom Park said should be arrested. Each time the discussion drifted to other subjects, Cha continued to bring up the inability of KCIA to end the crisis and suggested that demonstrators and opposition lawmakers should be "mowed down with tanks." The rebukes from Park and especially Cha riled up Kim Jae-gyu. Kim Jae-gyu left the dining room to convene with his closest subordinates—former Marine colonel and KCIA Chief Agent Park Seon-ho and Army colonel and Kim Jae-gyu's secretary Park Heung-ju (no relations)—and said to them: "The chief of staff and deputy director are here as well. Today is the day." When asked if Park was included as a target, Kim Jae-gyu said yes. Kim Jae-gyu reentered the room with a semi-automatic Walther PPK pistol, shot Cha in the arm and Park in the left chest. He attempted to fire again on Cha, but the gun jammed. Cha fled to a bathroom adjacent to the dining room. Kim Jae-gyu came back with his subordinate's gun and again shot Cha, this time in the abdomen, and Park in the head, even though he was already dead. Upon hearing the initial shots, Park Seon-ho held two bodyguards in the waiting room at gunpoint and ordered them to put their hands up in hope of preventing further bloodshed, especially since he was a friend of one of the bodyguards. When the other bodyguard attempted to reach for a gun, Park fatally shot them both. At the same time, Colonel Park Heung-ju and two other KCIA agents stormed the kitchen and killed the remaining bodyguards. In the end, Park, Cha, three presidential bodyguards and a presidential chauffeur all died.

=== Aftermath ===
After killing Park, Kim Jae-gyu asked Chief Presidential Secretary Kim to secure the safe house and ran to the nearby KCIA building where Army Chief of Staff Jeong Seung-hwa was waiting. Jeong heard the shootings and was discussing them with KCIA Deputy Director Kim Jeong-seop when Kim Jae-gyu came in breathless to tell them that an emergency situation had occurred. In the car, Kim Jae-gyu advised Jeong that Park had died, but without explaining how. Kim Jae-gyu hoped that Jeong and Chief Presidential Secretary Kim would support him in the coup as both were appointed to their positions on his recommendation, and Chief Presidential Secretary Kim was especially close with him. The car initially headed to KCIA Headquarters in Namsan district but eventually went to Army Headquarters in Yongsan district, since the Army would have to be involved in declaring emergency martial law. Many historians believe that Kim Jae-gyu made a critical mistake in not going to KCIA Headquarters, where he would have been in control. His failure to gain Jeong's support sealed the conspirators' fate. Meanwhile, Chief Presidential Secretary Kim took Park's body to the Army hospital and ordered doctors to save him at all costs (without revealing Park's identity), and went to Prime Minister Choi Kyu-hah to reveal what happened that night. When Chief of Staff Jeong learned of what happened from Chief Presidential Secretary Kim, he ordered Major General Chun Doo-hwan, commander of Security Command to arrest Kim Jae-gyu and investigate the incident. Kim Jae-gyu was arrested after he was lured to a secluded area outside Army HQ on the pretext of meeting with Army Chief of Staff. Eventually, everyone involved in the assassination was arrested, tortured and later executed. Kim himself was hanged on May 24. In the process, Chun Doo-hwan emerged as a new political force by investigating and subordinating KCIA under his Security Command and later by arresting Jeong Seung-hwa, who had become the chief martial law administrator and Chief Secretary Kim on suspicion of conspiring with Director Kim, when Chun Doo-hwan seized power in the Coup d'état of December Twelfth 1979.

Kim is buried on a hillside at Samsung Development Park Cemetery in Opo-eup, Gwangju.

On May 26, 2020, Kim's family filed a retrial request with the Seoul High Court seeking a retrial for Kim on the basis that the original investigation and trial were illegal and that Kim had been tortured. On February 19, 2025, the court approved the retrial following a review. In mid-July 2025 the retrial commenced in the Seoul High Court.

== See also ==
- History of South Korea
- The President's Last Bang
- The Man Standing Next
