= Cho Gab-je =

South Korean journalist (born 1945)

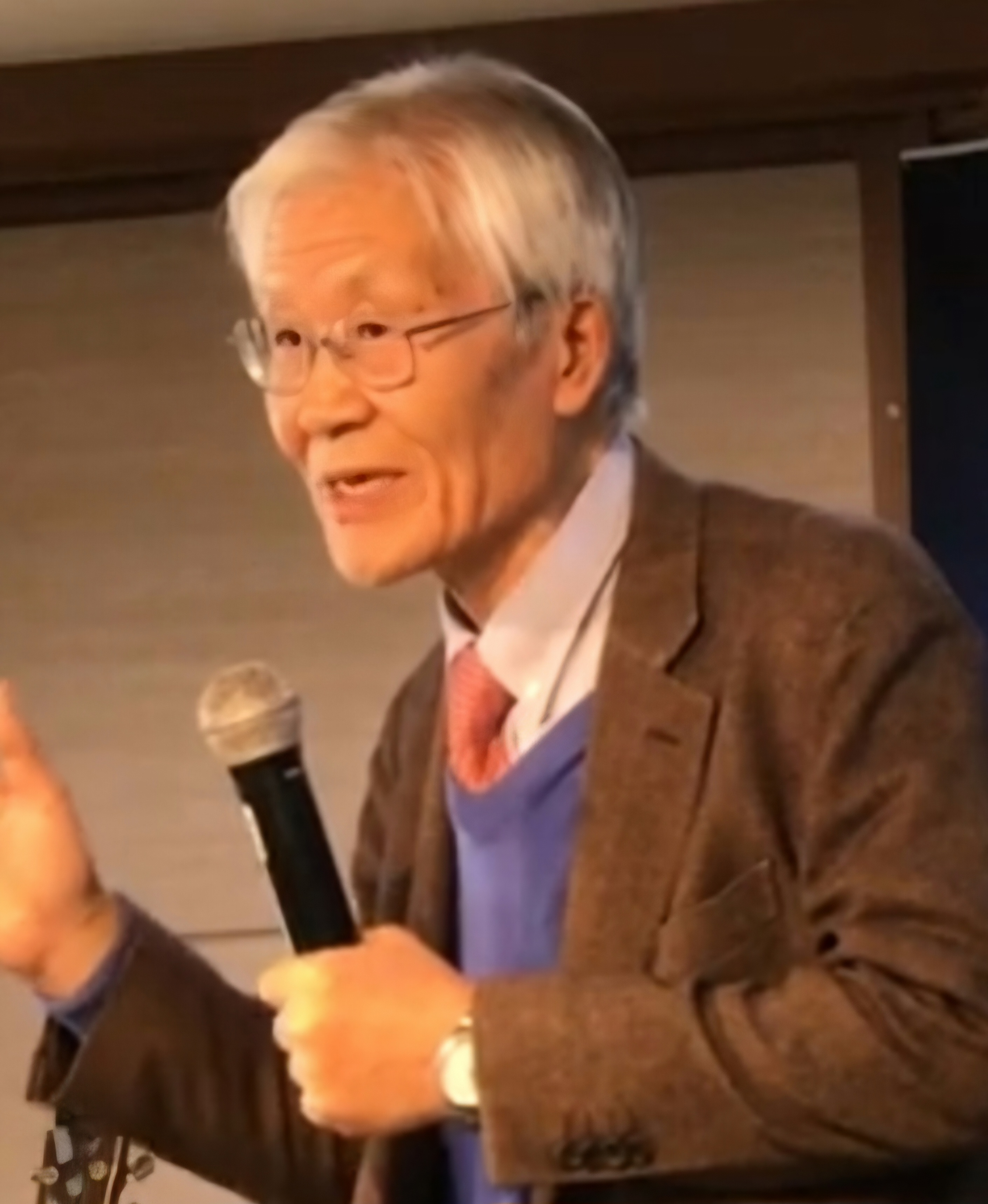
- Cho in 2019

Korean name
- Hangul: 조갑제
- Hanja: 趙甲濟
- RR: Jo Gapje
- MR: Cho Kapche

Cho Gab-je (Korean: 조갑제; born October 24, 1945) is a conservative South Korean journalist and entrepreneur. He was born in Saitama Prefecture, Japan in 1945 and raised in Busan, South Korea. Cho served as the chief editor and president of the Monthly Chosun. He authored several books including Spit On My Grave, a biography of the former president, Park Chung Hee, that was originally published serially in the Monthly Chosun.

Cho is a significant investigative journalist, but has become increasingly controversial over time. He is considered by others and self-professes to often making inflammatory and far-right remarks.

== Awards ==
- 1974, the 7th Korean Journalist Award - Traces of heavy metal pollution
- 1990, Magazine Writer Award
- 1991, the 4th Asia-Pacific Special Award
- 1994, Kwan Hoon club Journalist Award

== See also ==
- Jee Man-won
- Sunwoo Hwi
- Chin Jung-kwon
