= Assassination of Park Chung Hee =

1979 assassination of South Korean president

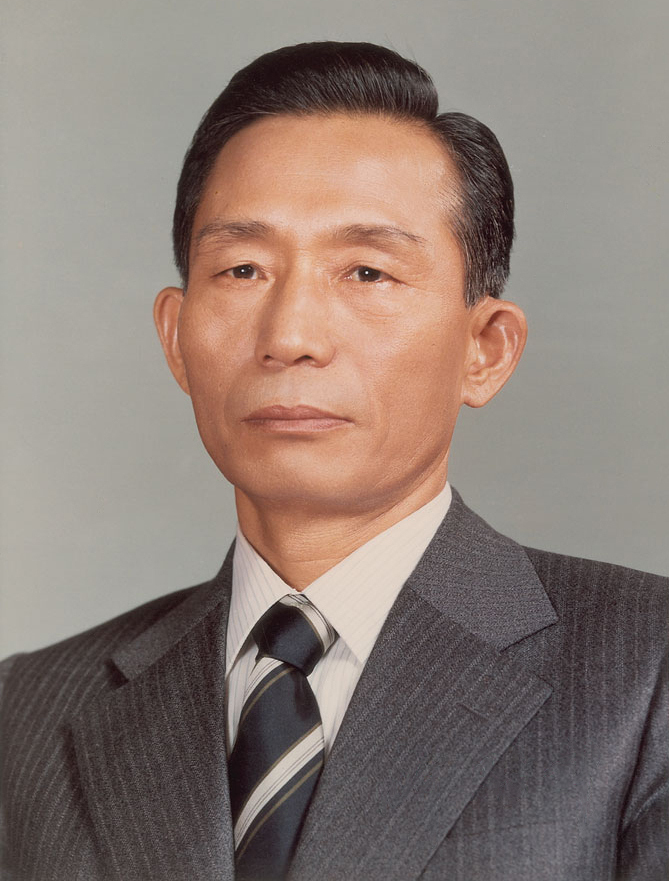
- Location: Gungjeong-dong, Seoul, South Korea
- Date: October 26, 1979; 47 years ago 7:40 p.m. (KST)
- Weapons: Smith & Wesson Model 36 and Walther PPK
- Deaths: 6
- Victims: Park Chung Hee, Cha Ji-chul, three bodyguards including An Jae-song, and a presidential chauffeur
- Perpetrators: Kim Jae-gyu, Park Heung-ju, Park Seon-ho, Yoo Seong-ok, Lee Ki-ju, Seo Young-jun, Kim Tae-won
- Assailant: Kim Jae-gyu

On 26 October 1979, Park Chung Hee, the third president of South Korea, was assassinated during a dinner at the Korean Central Intelligence Agency (KCIA) safe house near the Blue House presidential compound in Jongno District, Seoul, South Korea. It was the first assassination of a head of state on the Korean peninsula in 605 years since the assassination of King Gongmin of Goryeo.

Kim Jae-gyu, the then director of the KCIA, was responsible for the assassination. Park was shot in the chest and the head. The head of the presidential security service, three bodyguards and a presidential chauffeur were also killed by Kim and his co-conspirators. The incident is often referred to as "10.26" or the "10.26 incident" in South Korea.

There is a great deal of controversy surrounding Kim's motives; it remains uncertain whether the act was part of a planned coup d'état or was merely impulsive. Discontent with Park's regime had been simmering below the surface and had culminated with the Busan–Masan Uprising ten days before the assassination, which Park had brutally suppressed.

== Background ==
=== President Park's dictatorship ===
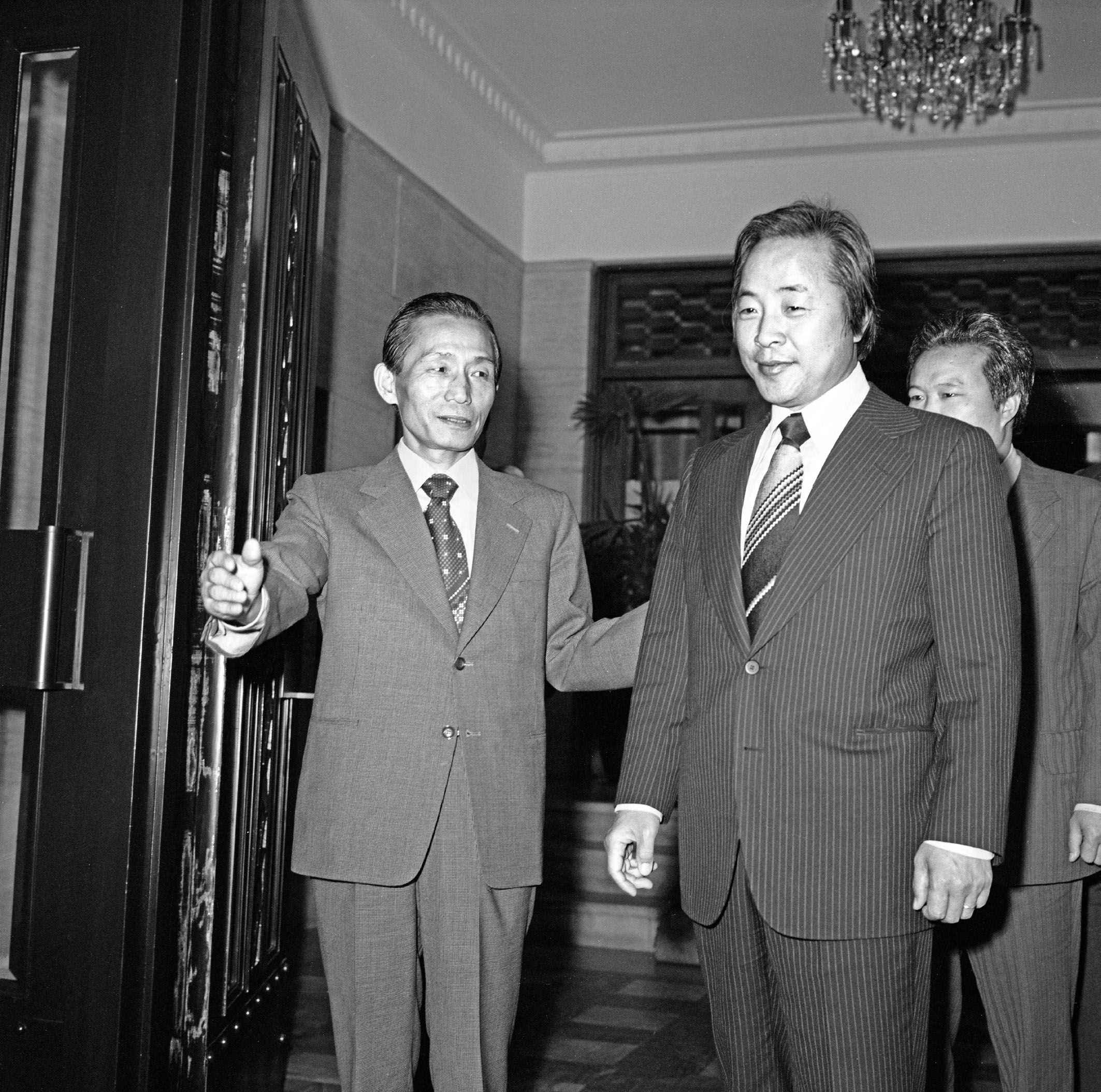
Park with future President Kim Young-sam in 1975

By the time of his assassination, Park had exercised dictatorial power over South Korea for nearly 18 years.

The Korean Central Intelligence Agency (KCIA) was created in 1961 to coordinate both domestic and international intelligence activities, including those of the military. Almost immediately following its creation, the KCIA was used to suppress any domestic opposition to Park's regime, including wiretapping, arresting, and torturing without court order. The KCIA was heavily involved in many behind-the-scenes political maneuvers aimed at weakening opposition parties through bribing, blackmailing, threatening, or arresting opposing lawmakers. Nevertheless, President Park nearly lost the 1971 presidential election to Kim Dae-jung despite spending ten percent of the national budget on his election campaign. Park then established the Yushin Constitution in 1972 to ensure his perpetual dictatorship. The new constitution replaced direct voting in presidential elections with an indirect voting system involving delegates. It also allotted one-third of the National Assembly seats to the president and repealed presidential term limits. Additionally, it gave the president the authority to suspend the constitution and issue emergency decrees, appoint all judges, and dismiss the National Assembly. When opposition to the Yushin Constitution arose, Park issued a number of emergency decrees, the first of which made any act of opposition or denial of the Yushin Constitution punishable by imprisonment for up to 15 years.

Despite this, opposition towards Park's rule persisted. In the 1978 South Korean legislative election, despite Park's Democratic Republican Party (DRP) maintaining a majority, the New Democratic Party (NDP) won the popular vote by a narrow margin which further emboldened them. In September 1979, the courts nullified Kim Young-sam's chairmanship of the NDP, and on October 5, the DRP expelled Kim from the National Assembly in a secret session, leading all 66 NDP lawmakers to submit their resignations to the National Assembly in protest. The Carter administration in the U.S. recalled its ambassador from Seoul in protest, as well. On October 16, when it became known that the government was planning to accept the resignations selectively, democracy protests broke out in Kim's hometown of Busan, the second largest city in South Korea, resulting in arson attacks on 30 police stations over several days. The demonstrations, the largest since the presidency of Syngman Rhee, spread to nearby Masan and other cities on October 19, with students and citizens calling for a repeal of the Yushin Constitution. The KCIA director, Kim Jae-gyu, went to Busan to investigate the situation and found that the demonstrations were not riots, but rather a "popular uprising joined by regular citizens" to resist the regime. He warned Park that the uprisings would spread to five other large cities, including Seoul. According to Kim's personal account, the President's chief bodyguard, Cha Ji-chul, cited the Killing Fields in Cambodia to note that one or two million Koreans being killed wouldn't make much difference. Park agreed and said that he would give direct orders to the security forces to fire upon demonstrators if the situation got worse.

=== Rivalry between Kim Jae-gyu and Cha Ji-chul ===
While Park faced increasing opposition to his dictatorship outside the Blue House, another conflict occurred inside the Blue House between Kim Jae-gyu, who was appointed KCIA Director in December 1976; and Chief Bodyguard Cha Ji-chul, who was appointed to his position in 1974 after Park's wife Yuk Young-soo was killed during an attempted assassination of her husband by Mun Se-gwang, an ethnic Korean from Japan. The rivalry stemmed largely from Cha's increasing encroachment onto KCIA turf and belittlement of Kim in public. Almost universally disliked yet feared, Cha served Park in close proximity and became his most trusted advisor. Cha also appropriated tanks, helicopters, and troops from the Republic of Korea Army, leaving the presidential security apparatus with an entire division under his direct command.

The rivalry between Cha and Kim was heightened further by a series of political crises in late 1979, as the two rivals clashed over how to deal with growing opposition to the regime. In the NDP's election of its chairman in 1979, KCIA backed Yi Chul-seung to prevent the election of hardliner Kim Young-sam, but Cha interfered in KCIA's political sabotage with its own behind-the-scenes maneuvers. When Kim Young-sam was elected as the NDP chairman, Cha blamed the KCIA, which infuriated Director Kim.

After Kim Young-sam called on the U.S. to stop supporting Park's regime, Cha pushed for Kim's expulsion from the National Assembly in an interview with The New York Times reporter Henry Stokes, which Director Kim feared to be a disastrous development. Cha easily bested his opponent, as his hardline approach was favored by Park; he blamed worsening developments on Director Kim's weak leadership of the KCIA at every opportunity.

== Assassination ==
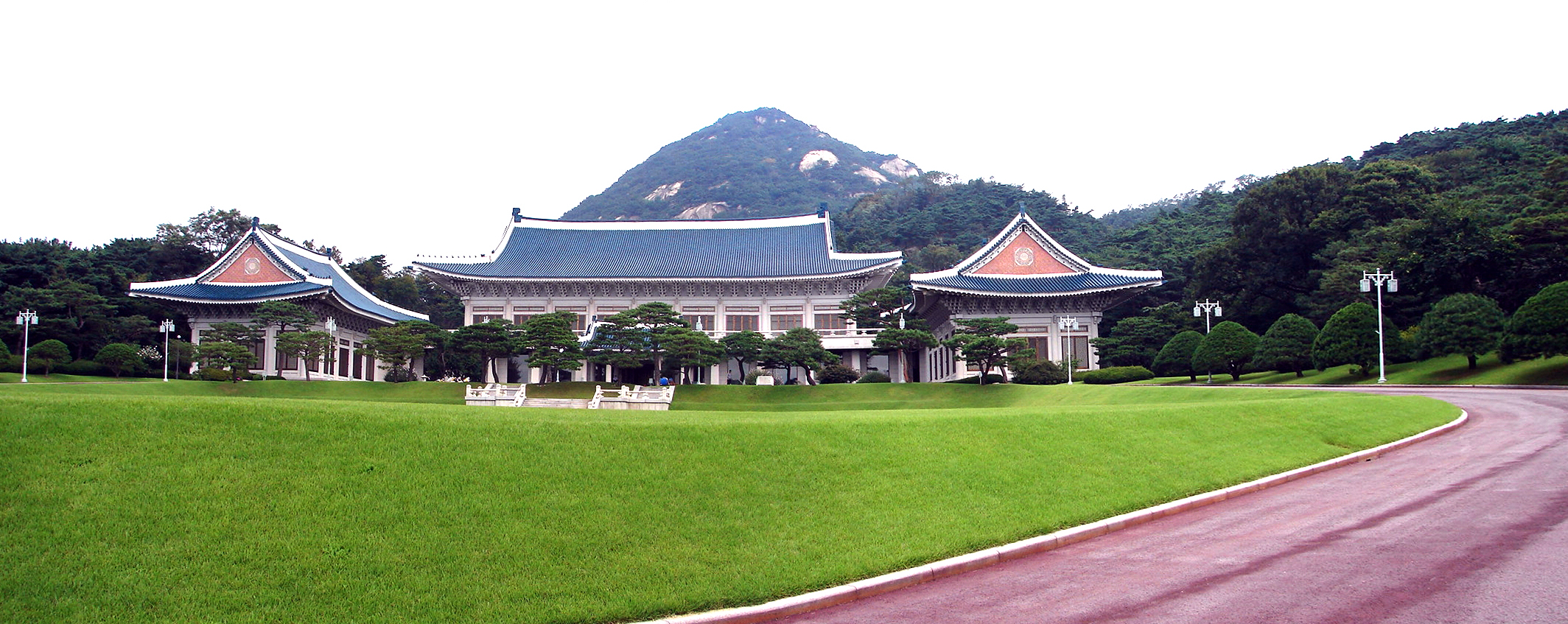
The Blue House in 2007

On the day of the assassination, Park and his entourage attended ribbon-cutting ceremonies for a dam in Sapgyo and a KBS TV transmitting station in Dangjin. Director Kim was expected to accompany him since the TV station was under KCIA jurisdiction, but after Cha prevented him from riding in the same helicopter as Park, Director Kim excused himself from the trip.

After the trip—according to KCIA Chief Agent Park Seon-ho, one of the assassination conspirators—Park instructed the KCIA to prepare for one of his banquets which were held an average of 10 times per month. The banquet was held at a KCIA safe house near the Blue House presidential compound (now the Mugunghwa Dongsa Park), and was to be attended by Park, Director Kim, Cha, Chief Secretary Kim Gye-won, and two young women: Sim Soo-bong, a rising pop singer, and college student and guitarist Shin Jae-soon.

15 minutes after Director Kim was notified of the banquet, he called Army Chief of Staff Jeong Seung-hwa, arranging for him to dine with KCIA Deputy Director Kim Jeong-seop in a nearby KCIA building in the same compound. Just before the dinner, Director Kim told Chief Secretary Kim Gye-won that he would get rid of Cha. It is not clear whether Kim Gye-won misheard, misunderstood, or ignored Kim's words.

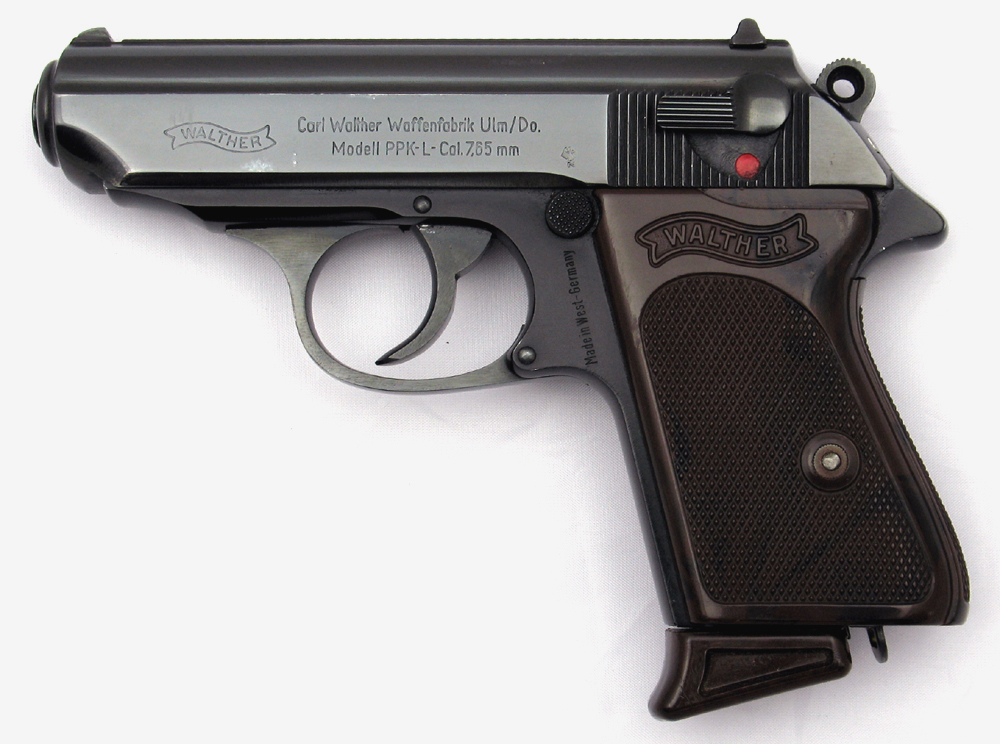
Walther PPK

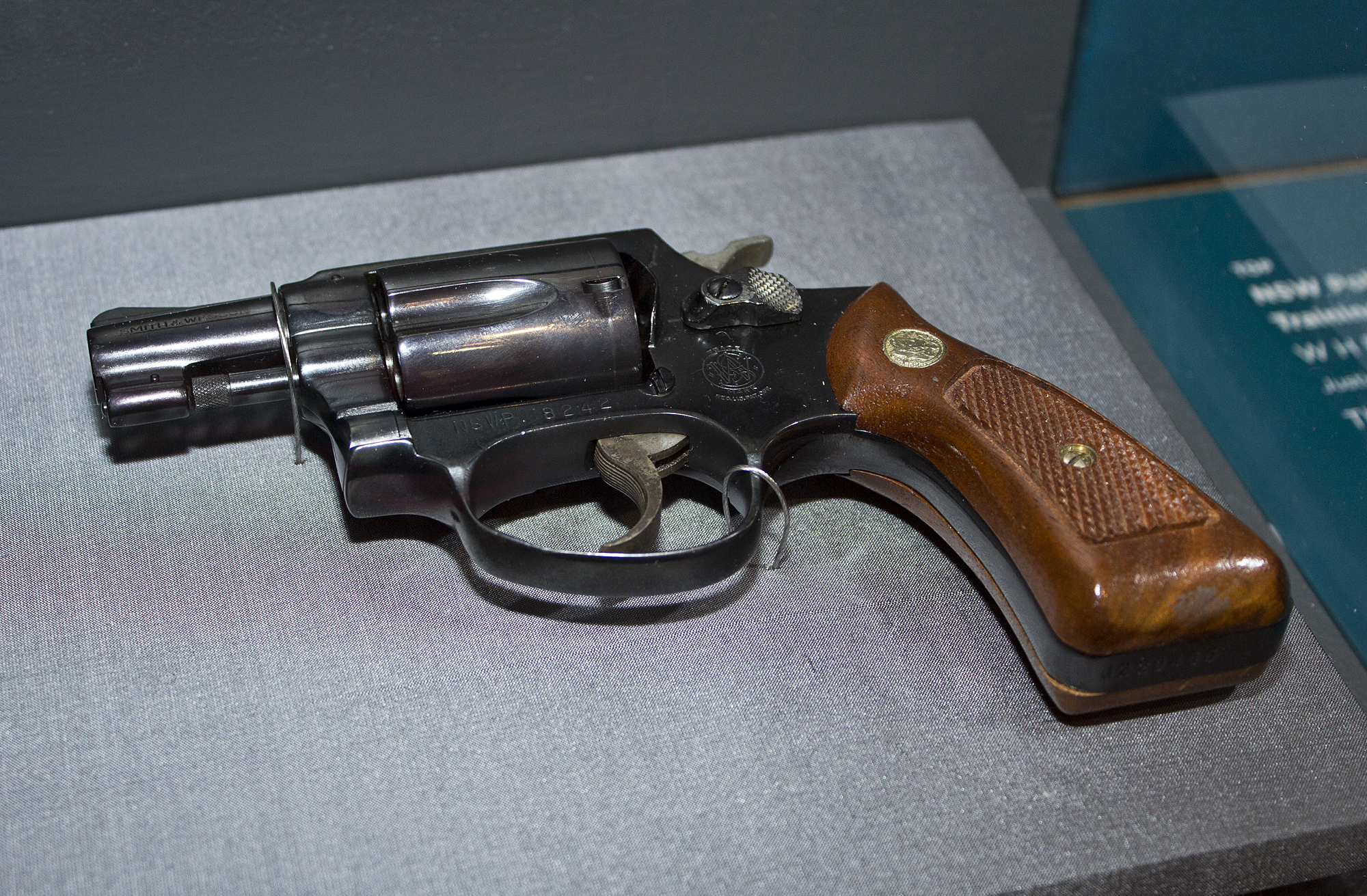
Smith & Wesson Model 36

At 6:05 p.m., during dinner discussions of volatile political issues such as the demonstrations in Busan and Kim Young-sam, Park and Cha took a hardline approach. Park said that Kim Young-sam should have been arrested, while Kim Jae-gyu argued that the public believed that Kim Young-sam was sufficiently punished just by being expelled from the National Assembly. Park said the KCIA should be more threatening. Director Kim called for moderate measures, while Chief Secretary Kim Gye-won was trying to steer the discussion to small talk. At 6:30 pm, Sim Soo-bong and Shin Jae-soon entered the banquet hall.

Kim Jae-gyu later left the dining room to meet Jeong Seung-hwa and Kim Jeong-seop, and he came out with his Walther PPK pistol, which he had hidden on a bookshelf in his office. Kim Jae-gyu then met with his closest subordinate, former Marine colonel and KCIA Chief Agent Park Seon-ho (Kim Jae-gyu's student when Kim Jae-gyu was a physical education teacher), and Army colonel and Director Kim's secretary Park Heung-ju (Kim Jae-gyu's exclusive adjutant during his tenure as head of the 6th Division). Kim revealed his plan to assassinate Park Chung Hee with Cha Ji-cheol and told them to prepare within 30 minutes. Kim told them that he would take them out this evening and that when he heard gunshots from inside the room, they should help him kill the guards. Kim said to them: "The Chief of Staff and Deputy Director are here as well. Today is the day."

Park Seon-ho and Park Heung-ju were surprised at first by the one-sided order, but they followed Kim Jae-gyu's orders and had Lee Ki-ju, the head of the security guard at the safe house (a former reserve marine sergeant, who always had Park Seon-ho's trust), and Yoo Seong-ok, the presidential chauffeur of the protocol department head's vehicle, join the assassination team. Yoo Seong-ok was a former Army sergeant; after being discharged from the military, he got a job as a KCIA driver. With the help of Park Seon-ho, he was assigned to a safe house, a first-class duty station; he was scheduled to get married in November of that year. At the scene, Park Heung-ju, Ki-ju Lee, and Yoo Seong-ok were in Na-dong's safe house. They hid inside a car parked near the kitchen and waited for the gunshot to be heard from the banquet hall. Meanwhile, Park Seon-ho prepared himself to kill Security Chief Jeong In-hyeong and Deputy Director Ahn Jae-song who were in the security guard waiting room, although he was hoping to convince them to stand down and, in effect, save them.

As 7 p.m. approached, Park Chung Hee looked at the clock frequently, and Cha Ji-cheol, seeing this, reassured Park by saying he would turn on the TV when the time was right. At 7 o'clock, Cha turned on the TV, which was on the door armor, with an automatic switch and watched news on KBS. After Kim Jae-gyu, who now was armed with a pistol in his pants pocket, reentered the banquet hall, Shin Jae-soon eventually noticed that Kim Jae-gyu, sitting across from him, was frequently looking at his watch. Park told him to turn off the TV, so Cha turned it off.

At 7:38 p.m., after confirming with Park Seon-ho that preparations were complete, Kim Jae-gyu entered the banquet hall again. At that time, Sim Soo-bong performed the song "I Love You" by pop singers "Lana.Et.Rospo", accompanied by Shin Jae-soon. Sim didn't like her performance, so she sang it again several times.

At 7:40 p.m., Kim Jae-gyu told Kim Gye-won to take good care of Park, shouted to Cha, "Insolent!", and opened fire, shooting Cha in the arm. Park shouted, "What are you doing?" Kim Jae-gyu then responded, "Hey, you try dying too." Kim Gye-won stood up, opened the door, and ran out. Kim Jae-gyu fired the gun twice at Park's chest from a distance of two to three meters, but the PPK jammed on a third shot. A shocked Sim Soo-bong immediately went outside, followed by a wounded Cha; he fled to a bathroom adjacent to the dining room and said, "Why is he doing that?"

When Kim Jae-gyu left the room, he came back with a Smith & Wesson Model 36 revolver owned by his subordinate Park Seon-ho. When Kim Jae-gyu aimed the gun at Park's head, Cha, who had emerged from the bathroom to look for a bodyguard, ran into Kim Jae-gyu as Shin Jae-soon ran to the bathroom in a crazed state. Cha then raised the door armor next to the door and resisted fiercely, but Kim Jae-gyu fired a gun into Cha's abdomen, fatally wounding him, after which Cha fell down next to the fallen door armor. Kim then took off Sim's arm that was holding Park before speaking to Park and shooting him in the head execution-style.

Upon hearing the initial shots, Park Seon-ho held two bodyguards in the waiting room at gunpoint and ordered them to put their hands up. He hoped to prevent further bloodshed, especially since he was a friend of one of the bodyguards, but when the other bodyguard attempted to reach for a gun, Park shot them both dead. However, at the moment when Park Seon-ho killed Ahn Jae-song and Jeong In-hyeong, the lights in the entire safe house suddenly went out. This caused Kang Mu-hong, in charge of repairs at the safe house, who was reading a newspaper in the underground boiler room, to mistake the gunshots for the sound of an explosion when the electricity short-circuited; however, Kang eventually realized that it was not a short circuit upon hearing the gunshots and shouting that continued outside, after which he turned on the circuit breaker again, locked the boiler room door, and hid himself.

At the same time, Park Heung-ju and two other KCIA agents stormed the kitchen area and shot the remaining bodyguard. Park Sang-beom was also shot and fell down, striking his head on the kitchen counter and falling unconscious; he was then mistaken for dead. However, the gunshot wound was only a flesh wound, and the bleeding was minimal and stopped naturally, which was later confirmed by Kim Tae-won, a security guard at the safe house. Lee Jeong-oh, the safe house cook, was shot in the stomach, and restaurant car driver Kim Yong-nam was shot in the shoulder.

Shin Jae-soon later testified that she went to the bathroom and opened the window to run away, but she was unable do anything because the window was multi-layered. After hearing around four gunshots, it became quiet, and she opened the bathroom door and saw people dressed in black carrying Park away. When she came out of the bathroom, she saw Cha lying down. An agent then guided Shin to the waiting room, and when she went to the attached room, Sim Soo-bong was there. The agent told them not to move in the room, so Shin sat on the floor with Sim. After a while, about seven gunshots were heard, after which the agent came in and led them to the bathroom across the street where they washed their hands and clothes. Park Seon-ho then came and guided them to the security guards' waiting room; gave them cigarettes, coffee, and juice; and told them not to go out. After a while, the agent gave them 200,000 won each and told them not to go out and talk about what happened that evening. Afterward, the agent drove them to the New Naeja Hotel, and when they got out of the car, he told them that they would never meet him again and that they should pretend not to know. Afterwards, Shin Jae-soon went to her home in Sim Soo-bong's car, which was waiting in front of the New Naeja Hotel.

In total, six people were killed: Park, Cha, three presidential bodyguards in the safe house, and a presidential chauffeur outside. One of the killed bodyguards was sport shooter An Jae-song.

== Aftermath ==
After killing Park, Kim Jae-gyu asked Chief Secretary Kim Gye-won to secure the safe house and ran to the nearby KCIA building where Army Chief of Staff Jeong Seung-hwa was waiting. While Jeong was having a meal with KCIA Deputy Director Kim Jeong-seop at a restaurant next to his office and talking about the Busan-Masan Uprising and the issue of building a housing development for noncommissioned officers, about 20 gunshots were suddenly fired nearby. Kim Jae-gyu, who was wearing a blood-stained shirt, came in to tell them that an emergency situation had arisen. Kim Gye-won then had the KCIA agents who were still in the safe house carry Park on his back and take him to the President's private car and head to the army hospital where the president's medical facilities were located.

Later, at around 8:05 p.m. in a car with Jeong Seung-hwa, Kim Jae-gyu notified Jeong that Park had died but without explaining how. At this time, Kim Jae-gyu raised his thumb to indicate that Park had been shot. When Jeong saw this, he asked if Park had died, and Kim Jae-gyu answered that he was certain that Park had died. Additionally, Kim Jae-gyu said that if Kim Il Sung found out, the ceasefire line with North Korea would be a problem and there would be bloodshed in the country, so security had to be maintained and martial law had to be declared quickly. Kim Jae-gyu hoped that Jeong and Chief Secretary Kim would support him in the coup, as both had been appointed to their positions on his recommendation and Chief Secretary Kim was especially close to Jeong. The car initially headed to KCIA Headquarters, in Namsan district, but eventually went to army headquarters, in Yongsan District, since the army would have to be involved in declaring emergency martial law. As the car passed in front of the Military Manpower Administration, Kim Jae-gyu gave Jeong a square cinnamon candy; he tried to eat it but secretly threw it on the floor, suspecting that it contained poison and could be used by him.

Some claim that the situation might have been different if Kim Jae-gyu had gone to the KCIA headquarters, where he would be in control, instead of the headquarters at this time. However, Kim Jae-gyu's failure to gain Jeong's support ultimately sealed the fate of the conspirators.

Meanwhile, Chief Secretary Kim Gye-won took Park's body to the Army hospital and ordered doctors to save him at all costs (without revealing Park's identity). At 8 p.m., Major Song Gye-yong, who was the commanding officer on duty, made an urgent call to Air Force Brigadier General Kim Byeong-soo, head of the hospital who was Park's attending physician since 1974, saying, "A patient with a gunshot wound has been evacuated, but he is D.O.A. (Death on Arrival)." Kim Byeong-soo, not knowing that the emergency patient was the president, said, "If you are D.O.A., why are you contacting me? You should contact the morgue at Capital Hospital and make preparations." Kim Byeong-soo rushed to work at 8:20 p.m. and rushed to the emergency room for an autopsy, but found that entry was blocked by KCIA agents guarding the area. Eventually, he went up to the hospital director's office, changed into his military uniform, and was able to enter the emergency room after his identity was confirmed. Suspicions were further amplified when Chief of Staff Kim Gye-won was contacted and told to "respectfully take the patient to the president's hospital room." Kim Byeong-soo said that when he went in, he thought he was just an emergency patient until he saw that the patient's face was covered with a white towel. Kim Byeong-soo then asked the bodyguards who he was, but they only answered that they didn't know. Kim Byeong-soo said they needed to know who he was, so in the end, the bodyguard lowered the towel halfway and showed only the right half. Later, Kim Byeong-soo only showed the left half to show that it was the president, but he only saw half of his face for the first time, so he didn't recognize Park. At 8:30 p.m, when Kim Byeong-soo took off the patient's shirt to check for gunshot wounds, he saw a white spot on Park's abdomen, and only then did he realize that he was the president. However, Kim Byeong-soo did not show the security guard that he knew that the dead person was the president, due to the severity of the situation.

After confirming that Park had already died, Kim Gye-won, who went to the Blue House, also urgently contacted key ministers. Kim Gye-won then went to Prime Minister Choi Kyu-hah to reveal what happened that night, after which he said martial law must be declared. Prime Minister Choi Kyu-hah arrived first, followed by ministers. Afterward, Kim Jae-gyu, who was in the headquarters bunker, and Kim Gye-won, who was at the Blue House, spoke on the phone, and it appeared that they asked each other to come to their side. In the end, Chief of Staff Kim Gye-won said to Prime Minister Choi Gyu-hah, "Let's go to the headquarters bunker"; he and his ministers arrived at the headquarters bunker at around 9:30 p.m.

At the Ministry of National Defense, an emergency cabinet meeting held in the headquarters conference room, Kim Jae-gyu hid the fact that Park was dead and said that since His Excellency was currently in exile, this fact must be kept under security for at least 48 hours, and martial law must be declared quickly, and if Kim Il Sung found out, it would be a big problem. However, contrary to Kim Jae-gyu's expectations, the State Council members, including Deputy Prime Minister Shin Hyun-hwak, protested. Justice Minister Kim Chi-yeol refuted this by saying that such a serious situation cannot be hidden for 48 hours through security for no reason and that the United States should also be informed of this fact. It made no sense for Deputy Prime Minister Shin Hyun-hwak, who arrived late at the headquarters, to suddenly impose martial law on Kim Jae-gyu; the whole story was as yet unknown. He protested by saying that before Shin Hyun-hwak arrived at the headquarters, other ministers were in a state of trembling due to Kim Jae-gyu's momentum, but when the State Council members strongly opposed Kim Jae-gyu's intention to declare martial law while hiding the fact that the president was assassinated, he was frustrated. Finally, Minister of Culture, Sports and Tourism Kim Seong-jin and others protested and demanded a suspension, and the cabinet meeting was suspended. As Kim Gye-won watched the State Council members protesting, he realized before anyone else that there was nothing behind Kim Jae-gyu and that he had no special plans in mind, and decided to reveal the truth.

At around 11:40 p.m, Chief Secretary Kim Gye-won secretly told Jeong, the Army Chief of Staff, and the Minister of National Defense Noh Jae-hyun that Kim Jae-gyu was the culprit. At 11:40 p.m, when Jeong learned of what happened from Chief Secretary Kim Gye-won, he ordered Chun Doo-hwan to take Director Kim into custody and investigate the incident. A cabinet meeting was held at around 11:50 p.m, and Prime Minister Choi Kyu-hah did not mention that the President had died, saying only that 'A serious situation concerning national security has occurred. That's why we convened a cabinet meeting'. Even then, many members of the State Council were unaware that the President had died.

Shortly after 12:30 a.m. on the October 27, Kim Jae-gyu was arrested after he was lured to a secluded area outside army headquarters on the pretext of meeting with Jeong. At around 1:20 a.m. on October 27, State Council members went to the Armed Forces Capital Hospital to confirm President Park's death. Prime Minister Choi Kyu-hah, Deputy Prime Minister Shin Hyun-hwak, Minister Kim Chi-yeol, Minister Kim Seong-jin, and Chief of Staff Kim Gye-won arrived at the hospital together. After crying and mourning, they returned.

Around 1:30 a.m. after the State Council members left, the security agency launched an operation to arrest the central government agents who were monitoring Kim Byeong-soo, and succeeded in arresting the two people. Their arrest operation was led by Lee Sang-yeon, head of the National Security Agency's inspection office. After hearing the news of President Park's death around 2:00 a.m. his second daughter, Park Geun-young, came to visit. She too wailed. Her bodyguards who followed her were her security agents. Before putting new clothes on Park's body, Kim Byeong-soo tried to remove the bullet lodged in the left side of Park's face, but his family opposed it, so he left it alone. They demanded that Kim Byeong-soo "not put a knife to his father's face." Around 3:00 a.m, Kim Byeong-soo moved Park's body to the Blue House. Later, Park Geun-hye also held President Park's body and wailed loudly. The Cabinet meeting resumed. At around 3:45 a.m, it was decided on the spot to declare martial law in all regions except Jeju Island.

On the early morning on October 27, at a safe house in Gungjeong-dong, Lee Ki-ju, who was the same age as security guard Yoo Seok-sul, came urgently carrying something. He told Yoo to take a pistol, a few shell casings, and the slippers Kim Jae-gyu was wearing and hide them in the garden.

At 7 a.m, while people were confirming the death of Cha, who died at the scene on October 26, they confirmed that bodyguard Park Sang-beom was alive and rescued him.

At 8 a.m, according to a radio broadcast by Tongyang Broadcasting Company, it was announced that an accidental conflict occurred between KCIA Director Kim Jae-gyu and Security Chief Cha Ji-cheol, and President Park died after being hit by a bullet fired by Kim, and Kim was detained by martial law forces and investigated.

Eventually, everyone involved in the assassination was arrested, tortured, and later executed. In the process, Chun Doo-hwan emerged as a new political force by investigating and subordinating KCIA under his Security Command, and Jeong Seung-hwa became the chief martial law administrator. Later, when Chun seized power in the Coup d'état of December Twelfth in 1979, he had Jeong Seung-hwa and Chief Secretary Kim arrested on suspicion of conspiring with Director Kim.

The Joint Investigation Headquarters ordered the women who attended the President's dinner to use the pseudonyms of Sohn Geum-ja (Korean: 손금자; Hanja: 孫錦子) (Sim Soo-bong) and Jeong Hye-seon (Korean: 정혜선; Hanja: 鄭惠善) (Shin Jae-soon), but the real names were circulated among people and eventually turned out to be true.

=== Fate of KCIA conspirators ===
Park Heung-ju, Kim Jae-gyu's secretary and former aide-de-camp of Kim, was executed by firing squad on March 6, 1980. He was executed first because he was on active military service at the time of the assassination.

Five men were hanged at Seoul Detention Center on May 24, 1980:

- Kim Jae-gyu, KCIA chief and assassin of President Park.
- Park Seon-ho, senior KCIA agent and pupil of Kim Jae-gyu when the latter was a middle school teacher.
- Yoo Seong-ok, a driver in the KCIA safe house.
- Lee Ki-ju, head of the safehouse security service.
- Kim Tae-won, safe house security agent; while he did not actually kill anyone, he was heavily involved in the planning, and after the assassination (on Park Seon-ho's orders), he fired an automatic rifle into the safe house in an attempt to disguise the shooting as an ambush by North Korean commandos.

Kim Gye-won was sentenced to death, but the sentence was commuted to life imprisonment a few days later, and he was released in 1982. Seo Young-jun, a safe house security agent, was released after serving 17 years of a sentence of life imprisonment.

Except for Park Heung-ju and Park Seon-ho, the co-conspirators followed Kim Jae-gyu's orders without knowing who they were shooting and why.

On May 26, 2020, Kim Jae-gyu's family filed a retrial request with the Seoul High Court seeking a retrial for Kim on the basis that the original investigation and trial were illegal and that Kim had been tortured. On February 19, 2025, the court approved the retrial following a review. In mid-July 2025 the retrial commenced in the Seoul High Court.

== Witnesses ==
- Kim Gye-won, chief secretary.
- Sim Soo-bong, famous female singer.
- Shin Jae-soon, a female student of Hanyang University and model.

== Cultural references ==
=== Film ===
- Ditto (2000 film)
  - Ditto (2022 film)
- The President's Barber (Korean: 효자동 이발사; Hanja: 孝子洞 理髮師; RR: Hyojadong ibalsa) (2004)
- The President's Last Bang (2005) – satirically depicted in a black comedy film.
- The Man Standing Next (2020) – depicted in a political drama film.
- 12.12: The Day (2023) – depicted the coup that followed the investigation of the assassination.
- Land of Happiness (2024) – fictional depiction of the court-martial of the perpetrators, focusing on Park Heung-ju.

=== Television ===
- Joo Byung-jin's Show (Korean: 주병진쇼; RR: Jubyeongjinsyo) (1993)
- Unanswered Questions (Korean: 그것이 알고싶다; RR: Geugeosi algosipda)
  - Episode 74 (1993)
  - Episode 75 (1993)
- Now We Can Tell the Story (Korean: 이제는 말할 수 있다; RR: Ijeneun malhal su itda)
  - Episode 78 (2004)
  - Episode 96 (2005)
- Kkokkomu (Korean: 꼬리에 꼬리를 무는 그날 이야기; RR: Kkorie kkorireul muneun geunal iyagi) – episode 99 (2023)

==== TV series ====
- 1979 World's Big Assassinations (Chinese: 1979世界大血案) (1990)
- Nation and Destiny (Korean: 민족과 운명; Hanja: 民族과 運命; MR: Minjok kua Unmyŏng) (1992)
- 4th Republic (Korean: 제4공화국; Hanja: 第4共和國; RR: Jesagonghwaguk) (1995–96) – Sim Soo-bong advised the drama, and it became a hot topic among people.
- 5th Republic (2005)
- Koreagate (Korean: 코리아게이트; RR: Koriageiteu) (1995)

=== Manga ===
- Kibun wa mō sensō (Japanese: 気分はもう戦争) (1982)

== See also ==
- Blue House raid
