= Jee Man-won =

South Korean politician (born 1942)

- Hangul: 지만원
- Hanja: 池萬元
- RR: Ji Manwon
- MR: Chi Manwŏn

Jee Man-won (Korean: 지만원; born November 20, 1942) is a right-wing South Korean politician and commentator.

He was born in Hoengseong, Kōgen Province, Korea, Empire of Japan on November 20, 1942.

He is a leading proponent of a conspiracy theory that North Korean operatives had instigated the 1980 Gwangju Uprising, a series of student-led, pro-democracy protests against the military coup that had taken place the year before.

Jee was indicted on multiple charges of defamation in 2016 against Kim Sa-bok and the Roman Catholic Archdiocese of Gwangju, among others, and sentenced to two years in prison in 2020. The courts concluded that "[Jee's claims] had the aim not of determining the historical truth of the May 18 Democratization Movement, but of disparaging and maligning its historical significance and value". He was not subject to arrest until 2023, when the Supreme Court of Korea upheld the lower ruling and ordered his detainment.

== See also ==
- Cho Gab-je
