= Jeong Seung-hwa =

South Korean military officer (1929–2002)

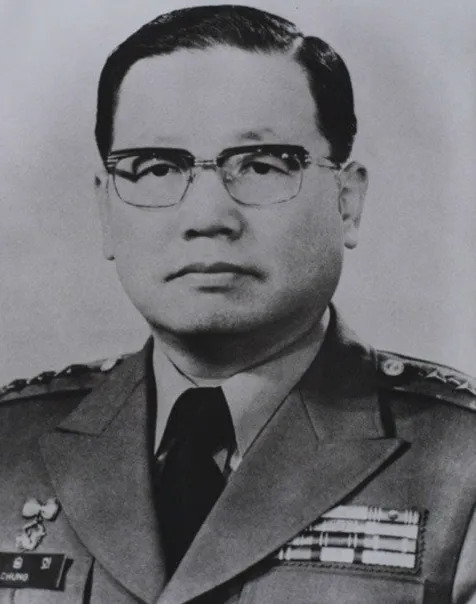
- Jeong Seung-hwa Portrait
- Born: Jeong Seung-hwa; 27 February 1929; Gimcheon, Korea, Empire of Japan
- Died: 12 June 2002 (aged 73); Seoul, South Korea
- Military career
- Allegiance: South Korea
- Branch: Republic of Korea Army
- Service years: 1947–1979
- Rank: General
- Commands: Chief of Staff of the Army; II Corps; Capital Mechanized Infantry Division; 3rd Infantry Division; 10th Infantry Brigade(Mechanized); 26th Infantry Regiment

Korean name
- Hangul: 정승화
- Hanja: 鄭昇和
- RR: Jeong Seunghwa
- MR: Chŏng Sŭnghwa

Jeong Seung-hwa (Korean: 정승화; 27 February 1929 – 12 June 2002) was a South Korean general officer, and the 22nd Chief of Staff of the Republic of Korea Army. He was present at the Blue House presidential compound, site of the assassination of President Park Chung Hee, when it took place on 26 October 1979.

== Biography ==
Born on 27 February 1929 in Gimcheon, Jeong Seung-hwa joined the South Korean Army as a conscript in the 17th Regiment and fought at the Battle of Pusan Perimeter. He later went to the Korea Military Academy and was commissioned as a lieutenant in the 26th Infantry Regiment in 1950, which he later commanded in the early 1960s. He then commanded a mechanized brigade and an infantry division, before being appointed as commander of II Corps in 1976.

In 1978, Jeong was appointed Army Chief of Staff, the most dominant role in the South Korean military. On the evening of 26 October 1979, while Jeong was dining at the Blue House presidential compound, South Korean President Park Chung Hee was assassinated at another facility nearby. The assassin, Kim Jae-gyu, immediately sought out Jeong with a view to having him take over the presidency. Instead, an emergency cabinet meeting was convened at which Choi Kyu-hah, the prime minister, was declared acting president with Jeong implementing martial law. He plotted to exclude political soldiers such as the Hanahoe, an influential group of South Korean military officers. The group later instigated the Coup d'état of December Twelfth. Jeong moved to reassign Chun, Roh Tae-woo, and other members of Hanahoe to less important posts to sideline them. Fearing their careers were at stake, Chun and the rest of Hanahoe moved before Jeong could completely sideline them. As a result, key members of the Hanahoe, such as Chun Doo-hwan and Roh Tae-woo, arrested Jeong on suspicion of involvement in the assassination of Park.

As a punishment, Jeong was reduced in rank to private and sentenced to life imprisonment. In 1997, 17 years after the coup d'état, Jeong was cleared of any involvement in the death of Park by the Seoul District Court. He was restored to his general officer rank and received pay that had been forfeited at the time of his sentencing. He died on 12 June 2002 in Seoul.

== In popular culture ==
Jeong is portrayed in the 2023 South Korean movie 12.12: The Day under the pseudonym "Jeong Sang Ho".

== See also ==
- Chun Doo-hwan
- Roh Tae-woo
- Jang Tae-wan
