= Monthly Chosun =

South Korean news and history magazine

- Editor: Bae Jin-yeong
- Frequency: Monthly
- Format: Digital, print
- First issue: April 1980
- Company: Chosun News Press (2010–); The Monthly Chosun Company (2001–2009); The Chosun Ilbo Company (1980–2001)
- Country: South Korea
- Language: Korean language
- Website: https://monthly.chosun.com/
- ISSN: 1228-2197

Korean name
- Hangul: 월간조선
- Hanja: 月刊朝鮮
- RR: Wolgan Joseon
- MR: Wŏlgan Chosŏn

The Monthly Chosun (Korean: 월간조선; Hanja: 月刊朝鮮) is a monthly Korean-language magazine published in South Korea.

As of 2023, it is owned by Chosun News Press, which in turn is owned by ChosunMedia. ChosunMedia also owns the Chosun Ilbo newspaper.

== Description ==
It primarily publishes on topics relating to current events, politics, economics, history, and culture. Each month, it publishes multiple articles on a selected theme. The magazine has been known since the late 1980s for its investigative journalism on major political scandals in South Korea. While the magazine primarily focuses on South Korean issues, it also publishes on international issues. For example, it published an interview with a member of the Islamic State in 2015.

The magazine is frequently cited in academic publications in South Korea, and has a reputation for being rigorous in its research. It has a target audience of 30 to 40 year-olds who are interested in academic-quality publications.

The magazine has been characterized as right-wing and anti-communist.

== History ==
=== Sedae ===
The magazine was first published in June 1963 as Sedae (세대; 世代; lit. 'Generation'). Its first editor-in-chief was Oh Jong-sik, although the position changed hands a number of times. The magazine contained 350 pages of A5 size paper. It compiled essays from various writers on topics relating to South Korean current issues. It had a reputation of being a mostly academic publication, although the magazine's stated target audience was people in their 20s.

=== Acquisition by the Chosun Ilbo Company ===
Chosun Ilbo Company had wanted to publish a monthly magazine for some time, and decided to acquire Sedae to do so. They then renamed the magazine to the Monthly Chosun.

The first issue of the Monthly Chosun was published in April 1980. The issue uses vertical type and features a guest essay by Ho Jong, the 6th prime minister of South Korea. After the acquisition, the staff made an effort to change the magazine's reputation of being a stiff academic publication to that of a current events publication with more general appeal. To this end, beginning in April 1981, they made an effort to include more color and black-and-white images in the magazine. Beginning in 1982, reporters like Cho Gab-je and Oh Hyo-jin produced investigative reports on South Korean government scandals. Beginning with the magazine's third anniversary in April 1983, the editors began using computerized typesetting. This reduced the time it took to produce the magazine, and contributed to its ability to include more recent stories in each issue.

The above changes led to a massive increase in popularity for the magazine. An article on the Kim Dae-jung kidnapping scandal from their October 1987 edition was printed over 405,000 times. The magazine became the first to publish the contents of a phone call that led to the arrests of former Presidents Chun Doo-hwan and Roh Tae-woo in the aftermath of the Coup d'état of December Twelfth. Bae Jin-yeong (배진영), current editor-in-chief of the magazine, alleged in 2021 that the magazine's publications during the late 1990s and early 2000s influenced government policies of the United States, South Korea, and Japan towards North Korea.

Until the late 1980s, most newspapers and magazines in South Korea used vertical writing. However, after the publication of The Hankyoreh in 1988, which only used horizontal type, most newspapers changed to horizontal. The Monthly Chosun resisted this trend until it finally switched in April 1999.

=== Recent history ===
In 2004, Cho Gab-je stepped down as editor-in-chief but maintained his role of president of the company. His replacement was Kim Yeon-gwang (김연광; 金演光). The reception to Kim's ascension was lukewarm; it was seen as relatively sudden and surprising, as Kim was in a relatively junior position at the time. Cho and Kim released statements saying that they had prepared for the transition for some time, and that the style of the magazine would not change significantly.

In 2005, Kim and reporter for MBC Lee Sang-ho were sued by Samsung as part of the "X-file Scandal". Both journalists had published extensively about bribes Samsung had engaged in around the 1997 South Korean presidential election. The courts ruled against Kim and Lee because their evidence of Samsung's bribes were acquired via illegal wiretapping.

On June 2, 2009, prosecutors summoned Lee Sang-cheol (이상철; 李相哲), former managing editor (2004–2005) and president of the Monthly Chosun (2005–2009) and then Vice Mayor of Seoul, for questioning. Lee was accused of accepting bribes of tens of millions of won between 2006 and 2007 to quash the publication of articles on a scandal relating to businessman Park Yeon-cha and President Roh Moo-hyun. The investigation ceased after Roh's suicide on May 23, 2009.

In 2021, it published its 500th edition.
