= Sapgyo =

- Town
- Interactive map of Sapgyo
- Coordinates: 36°41′11″N 126°44′12″E
- Country: South Korea
- Province: South Chungcheong
- County: Yesan County
- Administrative divisions: 21 beopjeongni, 36 hangjeongni and 150 ban

Area
  - Total: 49.6 km^{2} (19.2 sq mi)
- Elevation: 10 m (33 ft)

Population (2021.7)
  - Total: 10,075
  - Density: 203/km^{2} (526/sq mi)
- Time zone: UTC+9 (GMT +9)
- Area code: 41 (+82 Country code)
- Website: Sapgyo Town

Korean name
- Hangul: 삽교읍
- Hanja: 揷橋邑
- RR: Sapgyo-eup
- MR: Sapkyo-ŭp

Sapgyo-eup (Korean: 삽교읍) is a town (eup) in Yesan County, South Chungcheong Province, South Korea. It is located in the central-western part of the county, about 74 km (46 mi) northwest of Daejeon. The town covers an area of approximately 49.6 square kilometres and had a population of around 10,075 as of July 2021. Sapgyo serves as a rural hub characterized by flat agricultural landscapes along the Sapgyo Stream (삽교천).

== Etymology ==
The name "Sapgyo" (揷橋) is a Hanja rendering of the local dialect term sapdari (삽다리). According to historical records in the old Deoksan county gazetteer (Deoksan Eupji), the area was originally associated with the name Saeup-cheon (沙邑川), meaning "stream of the new town", where sa (沙) meant "new" in ancient Korean. The gyo (橋) element refers to a bridge over the Sapgyo Stream. The name was popularly reinterpreted as simply meaning "inserted bridge" (a temporary bridge built by piling materials), an etymology reinforced by singer Jo Young-nam's 1972 hit song "Sapdari".

== History ==
During the Joseon Dynasty, the area that is now Sapgyo fell under the jurisdiction of Deoksan county. In 1914, as part of the Japanese colonial government's administrative reorganization, territories from neighbouring areas were merged. In 1924, three townships — Jangchon, Daedeoksan, and Daejoji — were consolidated and given the name "Sapgyo" because the seat of the township office was located in Sapgyo village.

Archaeological findings along the Sapgyo Stream, including dolmens (goindol), standing stones, earthen fortress ruins, and Bronze Age artifacts, suggest the area may have been significant during the Mahan period. The village of Seong-ri (城里), whose old name Moksi is thought by some local historians to be connected to the Mahan state of Mokjiguk (目支國), has yielded numerous such finds.

In the modern era, Sapgyo has been significantly affected by the development of Naepo New Town, a planned administrative city straddling the border of Yesan County and Hongseong County. The Chungcheongnam-do provincial government relocated from Daejeon to Naepo New Town between late 2012 and early 2013, and several provincial institutions — including the Chungcheongnam-do Provincial Council and the Chungnam Provincial Police Agency — are now situated within the Sapgyo-eup portion of the new town.

== Geography ==
Sapgyo-eup is situated in the central-western part of Yesan County. The Sapgyo Stream flows through the town, and the surrounding terrain is predominantly flat lowland. The town is bordered by Oga-myeon to the east, Deoksan-myeon to the west, Godeok-myeon and Sinam-myeon to the north, and Eungbong-myeon and Hongbuk-eup (Hongseong County) to the south.

The town is known for the Sapgyo Plains, a fertile lowland stretching along the Sapgyo Stream through villages including Yongdong-ri and Seong-ri. Irrigated by the nearby Yedang Reservoir, the plains produce high-quality rice varieties marketed as "Golden Rice" (hwanggeumbat ssal) and are listed among the top ten attractions of Yesan County.

== Economy ==
Sapgyo's economy is primarily agricultural, centered on rice cultivation in the Sapgyo Plains. The Yesan General Industrial Complex and Sapgyo Industrial Complex are established in Hyorim-ri and Du-ri respectively. The town is also well known for its gopchang (grilled beef or pork intestines) restaurants, concentrated in a dedicated street near the old town center. An annual Sapdari Gopchang Festival celebrates this local specialty. A traditional five-day market also operates in the town.

== Transportation ==
=== Railway ===
- Sapgyo Station, Janghang Line
- Naepo Station, West Sea Line (Line open, station still under construction)

=== Roads ===
- Korea National Route 45, running east–west through the town
- Korea Local Road 619, running north–south

Sapgyo is also served by intercity buses operated by Chungnam Express and Hanyang Express, as well as rural bus services run by Yesan Transportation and Hongseong-gun.

== Education ==
- Sapgyo Elementary School
- Yongdong Elementary School
- Boseong Elementary School
- Sapgyo Middle School
- Sapgyo High School

== Local attractions ==
- Deoksan Hot Springs — A natural sodium bicarbonate hot spring in nearby Deoksan-myeon, first opened to the public in 1917. The 45°C germanium-rich waters attract approximately 2.5 million visitors annually.
- Tomb of Prince Namyeon — The burial site of Yi Gu, father of the Heungseon Daewongun, located near Sapgyo. The tomb was the target of a notorious attempted robbery by Ernst Oppert in 1868.
- Yun Bong-gil Memorial — A monument and memorial hall dedicated to the Korean independence activist, who was born in Yesan County.
- Sudeoksa — A head temple of the Jogye Order of Korean Buddhism located on the slopes of Deoksungsan in nearby Deoksan-myeon. Its main hall, Daeungjeon, is National Treasure No. 49 and one of the oldest surviving wooden buildings in Korea.

== Sub-municipalities ==
Sapgyo-eup is divided into 21 legal villages (ri).

	Hangul	Hanja
Sapgyo-ri	삽교리	揷橋里
Pyeongchon-ri	평촌리	坪村里
Suchon-ri	수촌리	水村里
I-ri	이리	二里
Mok-ri	목리	沐里
Sin-ri	신리	新里
Anchi-ri	안치리	雁峙里
Songsan-ri	송산리	松山里
Yeok-ri	역리	驛里
Sangha-ri	상하리	上下里
Changjeong-ri	창정리	倉井里
Ga-ri	가리	駕里
Sangseong-ri	상성리	上城里
Yongdong-ri	용동리	龍洞里
Hapo-ri	하포리	下浦里
Seong-ri	성리	城里
Du-ri	두리	頭里
Singa-ri	신가리	新佳里
Banga-ri	방아리	方阿里
Hyorim-ri	효림리	孝林里
Wolsan-ri	월산리	月山里
