= Sim Soo-bong =

South Korean singer

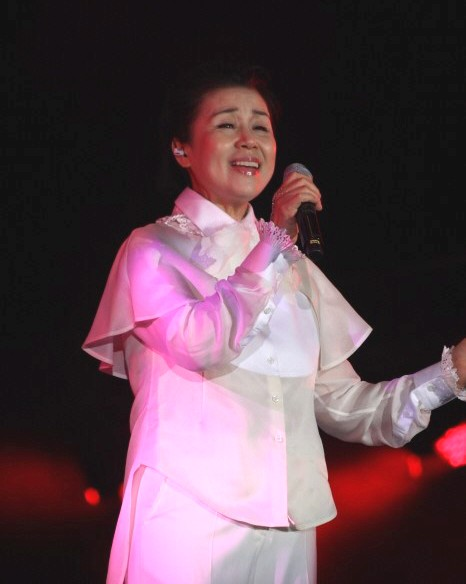
- Sim in 2014

Background information
- Born: Sim Min-kyung; July 11, 1955 (age 71); Mun'gyŏng, South Korea
- Origin: Seosan, South Chungcheong
- Genre: Trot
- Occupations: Singer; songwriter
- Years active: 1978–present
- Website: simsoobong.com

- Sim Soo-bong
- Hangul: 심민경
- Hanja: 沈玟卿
- RR: Sim Mingyeong
- MR: Sim Min'gyŏng

Stage name
- Hangul: 심수봉
- Hanja: 沈守峰
- RR: Sim Subong
- MR: Sim Subong

Sim Min-kyung (Korean: 심민경; born July 11, 1955), known professionally as Sim Soo-bong (심수봉), is a South Korean singer. When she was a senior at Myongji University, she debuted in 1978 through MBC College Song Contest (Korean: MBC 대학가요제) at which she performed her self-composed song "Geuddae Geu Saram" (그때 그사람). She was one of the witnesses of the 1979 assassination of South Korean president Park Chung Hee.

== Early life and education ==
She was born to a Korean traditional folk song collector, Sim Jae-deok, who was a Korean traditional music lecturer in Ewha Womans University. He died when Sim was 3 years old. Her uncle, Sim Sa-geon, was a Pansori singer and her aunt, Sim Hwa-yeong, was a traditional dancer, Seungmu. Her mother had been a student of her father.

Sim learned to play the piano when she was an elementary school student in Seosan, and later she came to Seoul and attended Eunro Elementary School in Heukseok-dong. By 13, she was adept at playing drum, piano, and guitar.

At that time, she suffered from an unknown disease causing her to quit school. She retreated to a small island near Incheon, and her mother devoted herself to a new cult. She graduated from Inhwa Women's High School in Inchon.

== Career ==
She met trot singer Nah Hoon-ah in 1975 who was a top singer at that time. Nah was impressed by her singing and was introduced to Sinsegi Records, but her album did not hit the market because the record company did not think that it would be a success.

In 1976, Sim applied to Sookmyung Women's University as a composition major, but was rejected. The following year, she was admitted to Myongji University as a Business Administration major.

In 1978, when she was 23, she appeared with a song she wrote in MBC College Song Contest, and immediately received media attention. That year, her first record of new-style trot music was a huge success.

After her television ban was lifted in 1981, Sim returned to the music industry and achieved massive commercial success throughout the 1980s and 1990s. In 1984, she released "Men are Ships, Women are Ports" (Namjaneun Bae Yeoganeun Hang-gu), which sold over 200,000 copies and re-established her as one of South Korea's premier female vocalists. She continued her success with enduring hits such as "I Don't Know Anything But Love" (Sarangbakken Nan Molla) in 1987 and "A Million Roses" (Baekman Songi Jangmi) in 1997.

Unlike many traditional trot performers of her era, Sim gained widespread recognition as a self-composing female singer-songwriter. Her signature style integrated classic Korean trot melodies with contemporary ballad structures, jazz elements, and modern pop instrumentation, influencing subsequent generations of Korean pop and trot artists.

=== After witnessing the assassination of Park Chung-hee ===
Sim was one of the witnesses of the 1979 assassination of South Korean president Park Chung Hee. Park was a fan of Sim, and Sim had performed for the president before his assassination. Due to being a witness to the incident, she was banned from television until 1981. She said that she was present at his banquet three times. In an interview given during later years, she contested a misconception that he was a fan of enka. When she sang a song by Misora Hibari ("Kanashii Sake"), President Park yelled angrily, "Who brought a Japanese girl?" For the first time, she discussed the incident to the Japanese press in November 2006. Her interview was published in The Asahi Shimbun.

In 2012, Sim admitted that after the assassination, she had been incarcerated in a prison and then held in a mental institution for nearly a month, before she was released. She was banned from TV and radio until 1981, and was kept under observation for many years.

In addition to her ban from broadcasting media, Sim faced prolonged surveillance by governmental authorities during the Fifth Republic. Her 1984 release "Men are Ships, Women are Ports" initially faced censorship concerns before becoming a nationwide success.

The events of October 26, 1979, and Sim's presence at the banquet have been depicted in various media, including Im Sang-soo's 2005 satirical film The President's Last Bang, in which her character was portrayed by actress Kim Yoon-ah.

== Media appearances ==
- 2021: Hosted the special KBS Chuseok concert A Bloom of Korea - Sim Soo-bong (피어나라 대한민국 심수봉), marking her first exclusive solo television special in 26 years.
- 2023: Featured as a guest legend on MBN's Trot Girls Japan and KBS2's Immortal Songs: Singing the Legend.

== Discography ==
=== Singles ===
- "Geuddae Geu Saram" (그때 그사람 / That Person at That Time) (1978)
- "Men are Ships, Women are Ports" (남자는 배 여자는 항구) (1984)
- "I Don't Know Anything But Love" (사랑밖에 난 몰라) (1987)
- "Hate You" (미워요) (1988)
- "A Million Roses" (백만송이 장미) (1997)

== Awards ==
- KBS: Rookie of the Year, 1979
- MBC: Top 10 Singer of the Year, 1979
- 11th Mnet Asian Music Awards: Hall of Fame Award, 2009
- Hanteo Awards: Album Award (Trot), 2010 and 2013
