= Ben C. Lim =

South Korean politician (1893–1976)

Lim Byeong-jik 임병직
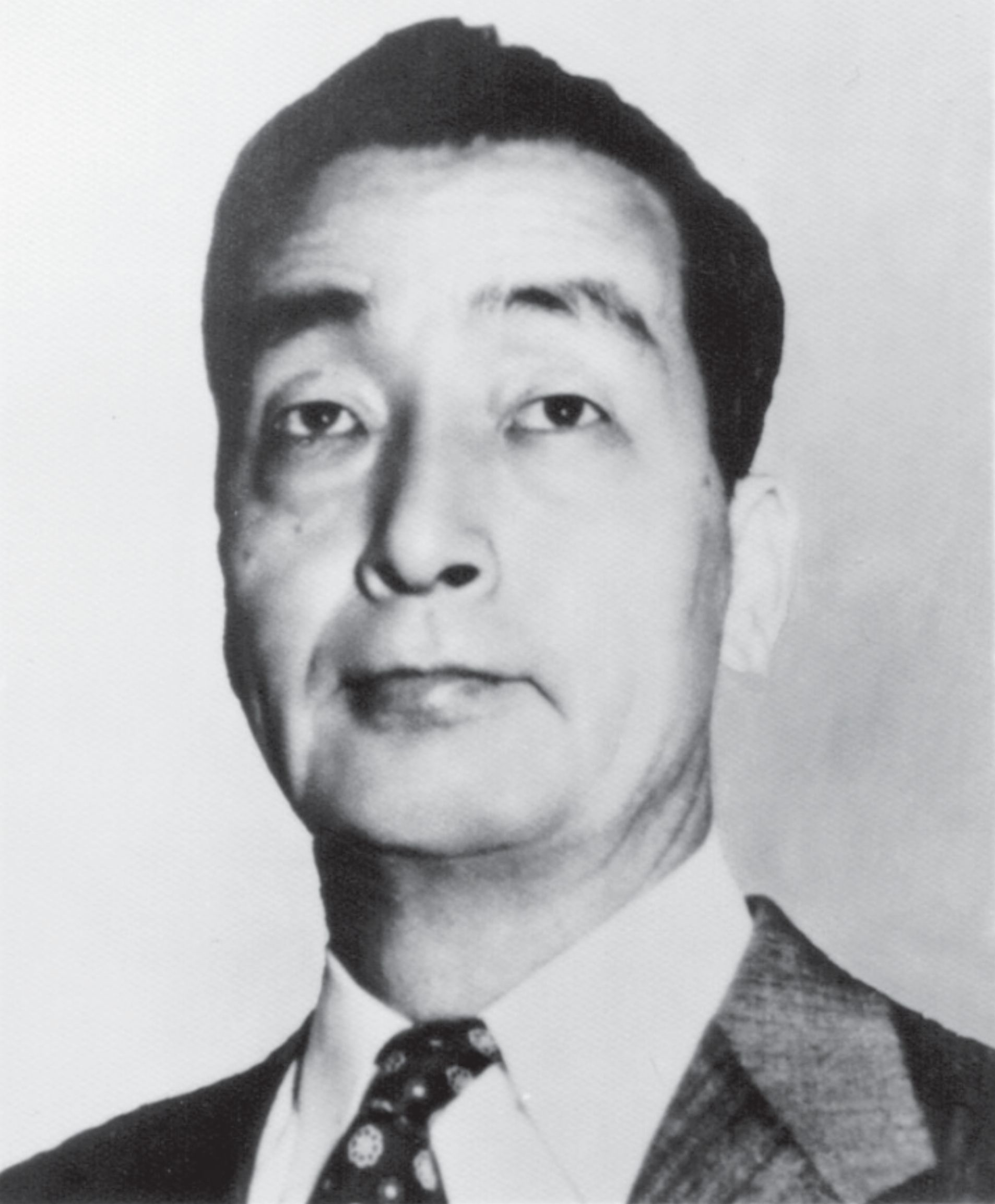

2nd Minister of Foreign Affairs
- In office December 28, 1948 – April 15, 1951
- President: Syngman Rhee
- Preceded by: Jang Taek-sang
- Succeeded by: Byun Young-tae

Personal details
- Born: October 26, 1893 Buyeo County, Chungcheong Province, Joseon
- Died: September 21, 1976 (aged 82) New York City, United States
- Party: None
- Education: Dickinson University

Korean name
- Hangul: 임병직
- RR: Im Byeongjik
- MR: Im Pyŏngjik

Lim Byeong-jik (Korean: 임병직; October 26, 1893 – September 21, 1976), also known as Ben C. Limb, was the Minister of Foreign Affairs of South Korea and President Syngman Rhee's personal secretary.

== Biography ==
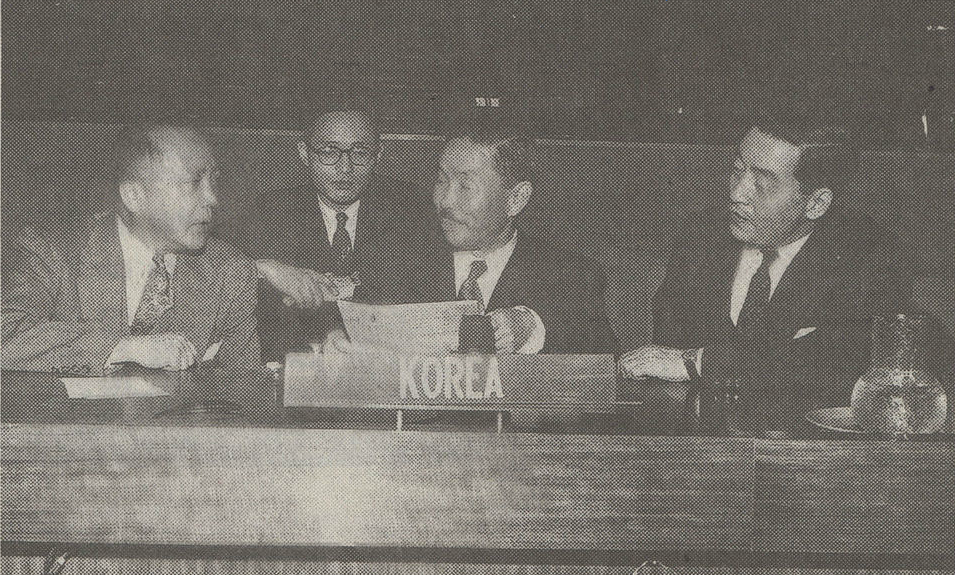
Korean representatives at the U.N. General Assembly in 1954. From left, Yang Yoo-chan, Han Pyo-wook, Byun Yeong-tae, and Lim Ben C.

Lim worked as President Rhee's personal secretary in the United States. Rhee appointed Lim to fight for Korean independence.

As Rhee's secretary in the U.S. committee, he delivered Rhee's personal letter to the minister of the Japanese embassy, demanding that he grant him approval for Korea's independence. In 1941, when the Korean Committee in the U.S. was organized, he was elected as one of the executive committee members. After Korea's liberation, Rhee returned to Korea, but Lim was appointed the president of the U.S. committee. Upon returning to Korea, he became the second South Korean foreign minister. He also worked as the Korean ambassador to the United Nations.

== Order of merit ==
In 1976, the South Korean government posthumously honored him with the Order of Merit for National Foundation for his outstanding service and contribution to the Korean independence movement.
