= 1948 South Korean presidential election =

First presidential elections in South Korea

- 20 July 1948
- Presidential election
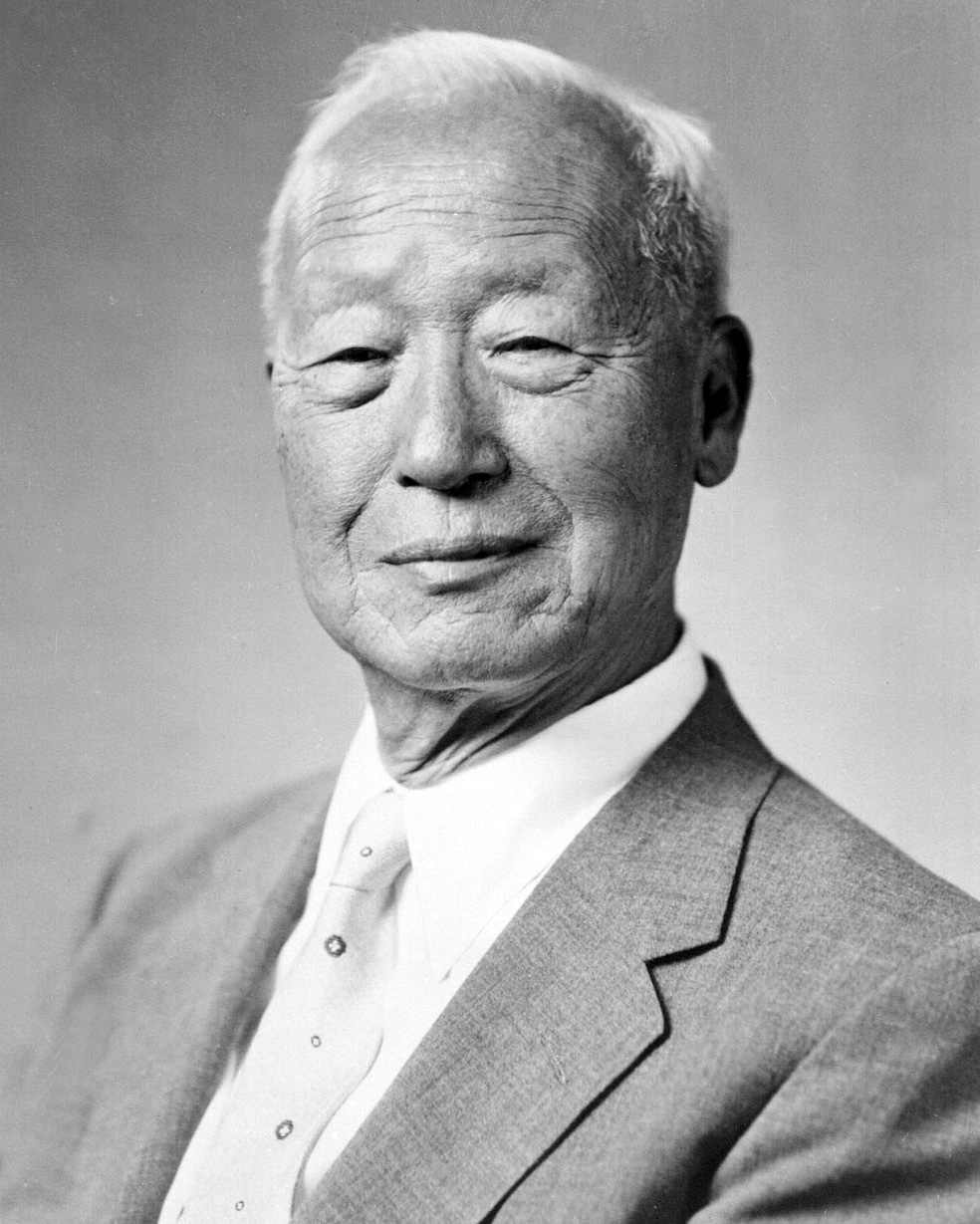

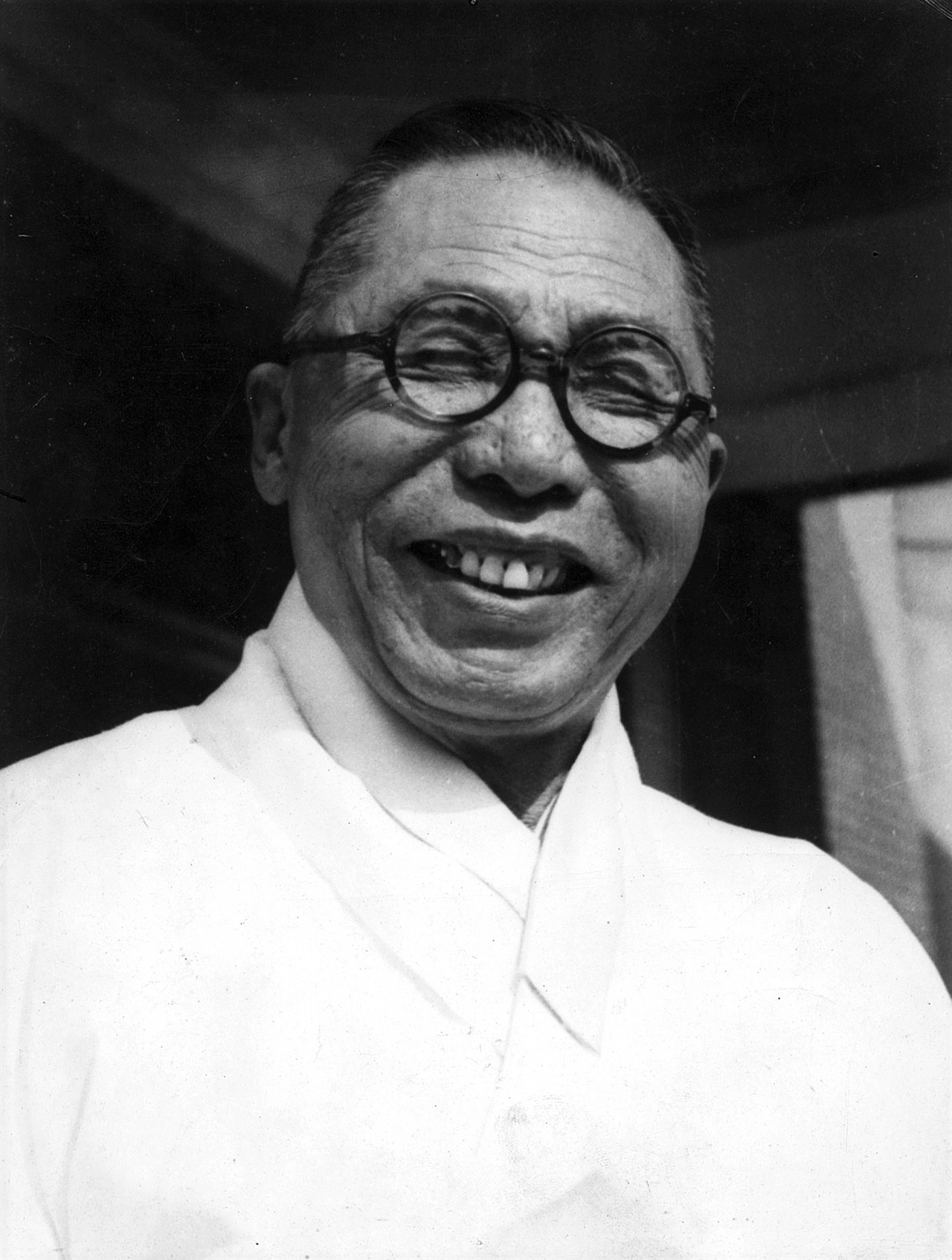
Nominee	Syngman Rhee	Kim Ku
Party	NARRKI	Korea Independence
Electoral vote	180	13
Elected President
Syngman Rhee
NARRKI
- Vice presidential election
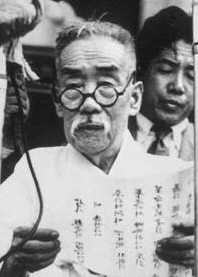

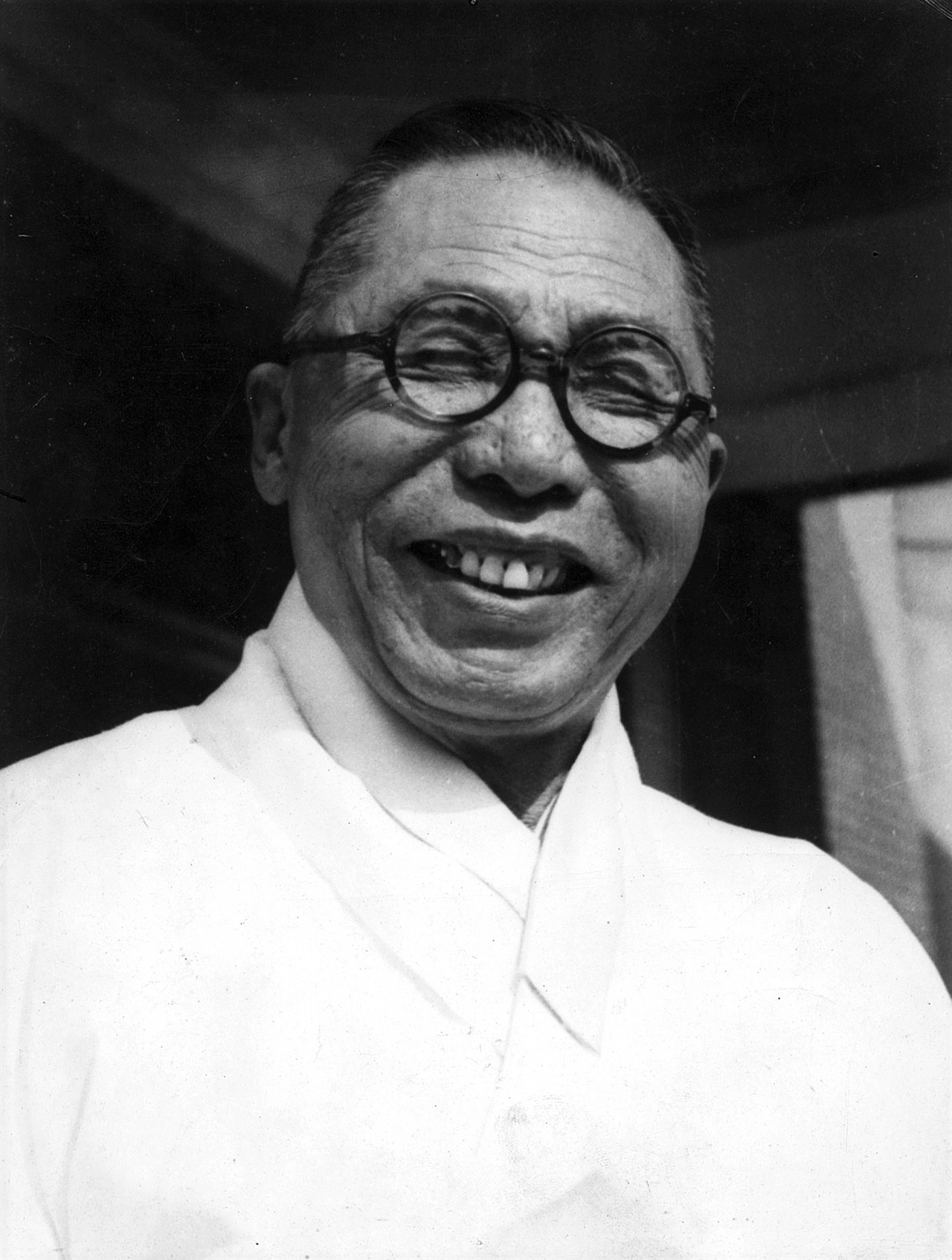
Nominee	Yi Si-yeong	Kim Ku
Party	NARRKI	Korea Independence
Electoral vote	133	62
Elected Vice president
Yi Si-yeong
NARRKI

Presidential and vice presidential elections were held in South Korea on 20 July 1948, following the Constitutional Assembly elections in May. The president was to be elected by the members of the National Assembly, as instructed by the 1948 Constitution. Of the 198 members of the National Assembly, 196 were present for the vote. A candidate required two-thirds of the votes cast to win. Syngman Rhee was elected with 180 votes, and took over the government to oversee the transfer of power from the United States Army Military Government in Korea.

An important role was played in the run-up to the election by the dispute between Rhee and Kim Ku over the issue of establishing a separate government in the southern part of Korea, instead of including the communist-controlled north. Kim rejected the idea of separate elections, and had boycotted the Constitutional Assembly elections in May, instead campaigning for a united Korea. He also split from the National Alliance for the Rapid Realization of Korean Independence to form the Korea Independence Party. Despite Kim's refusal to take any part in a South-only government and therefore in this election, 13 members cast their votes for Kim.

In the event, Kim's split allowed Rhee to consolidate power over NARRKI and, in 1951, form the Liberal Party, enabling his rule over South Korea until the April Revolution in 1960.

== Results ==
=== President ===
In order to be elected, a candidate had to receive at least two-thirds of the votes cast, including blank and invalid ballots. While there were 198 members in the National Assembly, 196 members participated in the voting. Therefore, the number of votes needed to win the presidency was 131.

Even though Kim Ku did not send his approvals for the new South Korean government and insisted that the lawmakers not cast votes for him, 13 of the 196 lawmakers who voted voted for Kim Ku. The election, however, ended as a landslide victory of the only candidate that actively sought the presidency, Rhee Syng-man, who received 180 of the 196 votes cast. One vote was invalidated, as it was cast for independence activist Seo Jae-pil, who at the time was a US citizen.

Candidate	Party	Votes	%
Syngman Rhee	NARRKI	180	92.31
Kim Ku	Korea Independence Party	13	6.67
An Jae-hong	Independent	2	1.03
Total		195	100.00
Valid votes		195	99.49
Invalid/blank votes		1	0.51
Total votes		196	100.00
Registered voters/turnout		198	98.99

=== Vice president ===
Endorsed by Rhee Syngman and the Korea Democratic Party, former Finance Minister of Provisional Government Yi Si-yeong was elected vice president, but only in the second round. The Constitution stated that for the first two rounds of voting, candidates need to win 2/3 of the votes to win. Had Yi failed to win the required 132 votes in the second round of voting, a runoff election would have been conducted of him and runner-up Kim Ku, and whoever won the plurality of the votes would have become the vice president.

Candidate	Party	First round		Second round	
Candidate	Party	Votes	%	Votes	%
Yi Si-yeong	NARRKI	113	57.36	133	67.86
Kim Ku	Korea Independence Party	65	32.99	62	31.63
Cho Man-sik	Choseon Democratic Party	10	5.08		
Oh Se-chang	Independent	5	2.54		
Chang Taek-sang	Independent	3	1.52		
Seo Sang-il	Korea Democratic Party	1	0.51		
Yi Gu-su	Independent	0	0.00	1	0.51
Total		197	100.00	196	100.00
Valid votes		197	100.00	196	99.49
Invalid/blank votes		0	0.00	1	0.51
Total votes		197	100.00	197	100.00
Registered voters/turnout		198	99.49	198	99.49
