= Chang Taek-sang =

South Korean politician (1893–1969)

His Excellency Chang Taek-sang
- 장택상
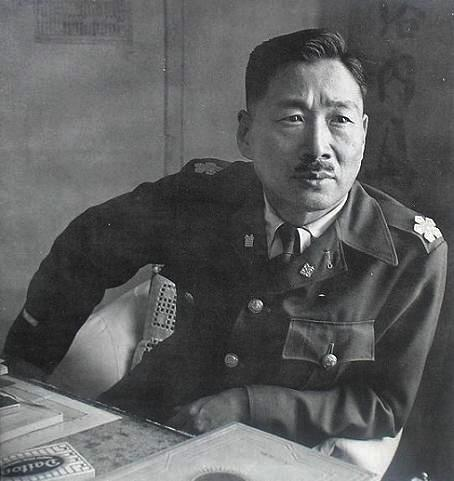

1st Minister of Foreign Affairs
- In office August 15, 1948 – December 24, 1948
- President: Syngman Rhee
- Prime Minister: Lee Beom-seok
- Vice President: Yi Si-yeong
- Preceded by: Position established
- Succeeded by: Ben C. Lim

Acting Vice President of South Korea
- In office June 28, 1952 – August 14, 1952
- President: Syngman Rhee
- Prime Minister: (Himself)
- Vice President: (Himself)
- Preceded by: Kim Seong-su
- Succeeded by: Ham Tae-young

3rd Prime Minister of South Korea
- In office May 6, 1952 – October 5, 1952
- President: Syngman Rhee
- Prime Minister: (Himself)
- Vice President: (Himself); Ham Tae-young
- Preceded by: Yi Yun-yong (acting)
- Succeeded by: Baek Du-jin

Personal details
- Born: October 22, 1893 Chilgok, Gyeongsang Province, Joseon
- Died: August 1, 1969 (aged 75) Seoul, South Korea
- Party: Liberal Party
- Spouse(s): Jinju Jeong-ssi, Pungsan Ryu-ssi, Kim Yeon-sik
- Education: Waseda University; University of Edinburgh (dropped out)

Korean name
- Hangul: 장택상
- Hanja: 張澤相
- RR: Jang Taeksang
- MR: Chang T'aeksang

Art name
- Hangul: 창랑
- Hanja: 滄浪
- RR: Changrang
- MR: Ch'angnang

Courtesy name
- Hangul: 치우
- Hanja: 致雨
- RR: Chiu
- MR: Ch'iu

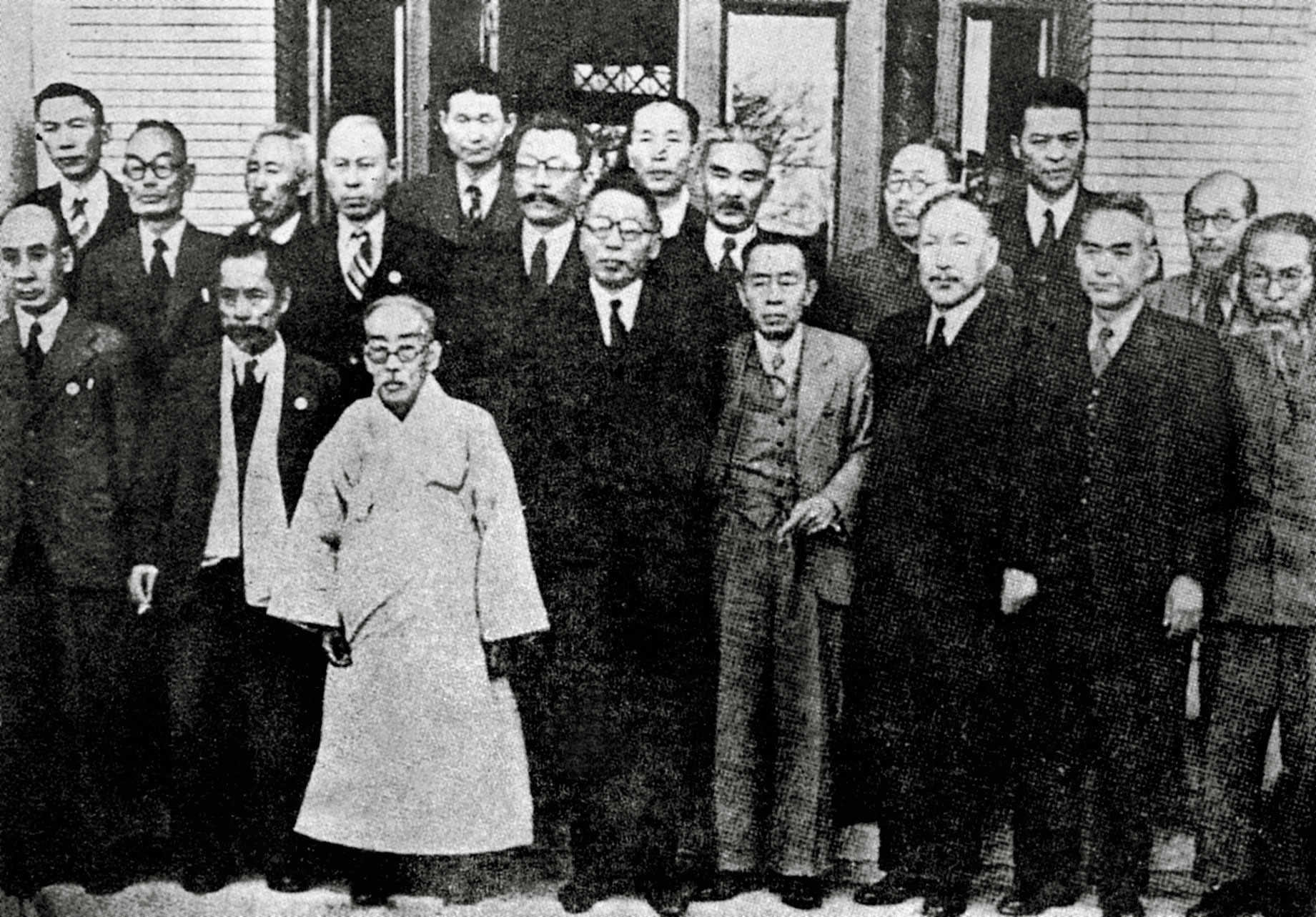
December 3, 1945. A photograph commemorating the return of the Provisional Government leaders with Chang Taek-sang included

Chang Taek-sang (Korean: 장택상; October 22, 1893 – August 1, 1969), also spelled Jang Taek-sang, was a Korean independence activist and South Korean policeman and politician. He was the prime minister of South Korea and Minister of Foreign Affairs. His art name was Changrang.

== Life ==
Chang, or Jang held this position of Prime Minister of Foreign Affairs during the Korean War. He attended the University of Edinburgh, Scotland earlier in his life, becoming the first Asian student to attend the University in Scotland. Chang became First Minister of Foreign Affairs and Trade from August 15 to December 24, 1948, after the ministry was established on July 17, 1948. During his term, he was in charge of diplomacy for South Korea, as well as handling external trade and matters related to overseas Korean nationals (which was crucial during this period in Korea). From May 6, 1952, to October 6, 1952, he served as the prime minister of the First Republic of Korea.

In July 2006, Jang Byung-hye (Peggy Jang), the daughter of Jang Taek-sang, and Rhee In-soo, an adopted son of South Korea's first president Syngman Rhee, filed a lawsuit against the producers of Seoul 1945. They claimed that the drama distorts history and belittles the achievements of their late fathers.

== Work book ==
- South Korea's founding and me (대한민국 건국과 나, 1969)

== Popular culture ==
- Portrayed by Lee Jung-gil in the 1981–82 TV series, 1st Republic.
- Portrayed by Kim Dong-hyun in the 2006 KBS1 TV series Seoul 1945.

Preceded by Yi Yun-yong (acting)	3rd Prime Minister of South Korea; 1952	Succeeded by Baek Du-jin
Preceded by -	1st Minister of Foreign Affairs of South Korea; August 15, 1948	Succeeded by Lim Byeong-jik
