= Ham Tae-young =

Vice President of South Korea from 1952 to 1956

Ham Tae-young 함태영
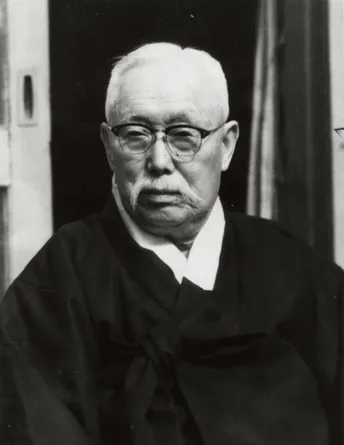

3rd Vice President of South Korea
- In office August 14, 1952 – August 15, 1956
- President: Syngman Rhee
- Prime Minister: Chang Taek-sang; Paik Too-chin; Pyon Yong-tae
- Vice President: Himself
- Preceded by: Chang Taek-sang (acting)
- Succeeded by: Chang Myon

Personal details
- Born: October 22, 1873 Musan, Hamgyong Province, Joseon
- Died: October 24, 1964 (aged 91) Seoul, South Korea

Korean name
- Hangul: 함태영
- Hanja: 咸台永
- RR: Ham Taeyeong
- MR: Ham T'aeyŏng

Courtesy name
- Hangul: 송암
- Hanja: 松岩
- RR: Songam
- MR: Songam

Ham Tae-young (Korean: 함태영; October 22, 1873 – October 24, 1964), sometimes Hahm Tae Young, was a South Korean politician, pastor and leader of the Presbyterian Church of Korea. He was the third Vice President of South Korea from 1952 to 1956. He was also a judge during the Korean Empire and an independence leader during Korea under Japanese rule. He was one of the organizers of the March First Movement.

During his tenure as a judge, he reversed the death sentence of the young Syngman Rhee, who became the first president of South Korea four decades later. After the Korean Empire fell and was annexed by Japan, Ham devoted his life to getting his country back. He was one of the 48 representatives of the March 1st Movement and was jailed several times. Ham was also active as a leader of Christianity in Korea, clashed often with Communists, and resisted Shinto rituals imposed by the Japanese government.

After Korea became independent following Japan's defeat in World War II, Ham was heavily involved in the founding of South Korea and expanding Christian institutions. Ham's first position in the new government was the president of the audit committee. Rhee asked Ham to be his running mate at the height of the Korean War and the two won the election. Ham retired from public service and received Order of Merit for National Foundation. Ham died of natural causes at the age of 91 and it was observed for 7 days in a type of state funeral. One of his sons Hahm Pyong-Choon later became a prominent South Korean politician and scholar.

Political offices
| Preceded by Kim Seong-su | Vice President of South Korea; 1952–1956 | Succeeded by Chang Myon |
