= Vice President of South Korea =

1948–1960 political office

Vice President of the Republic of Korea
- Emblem

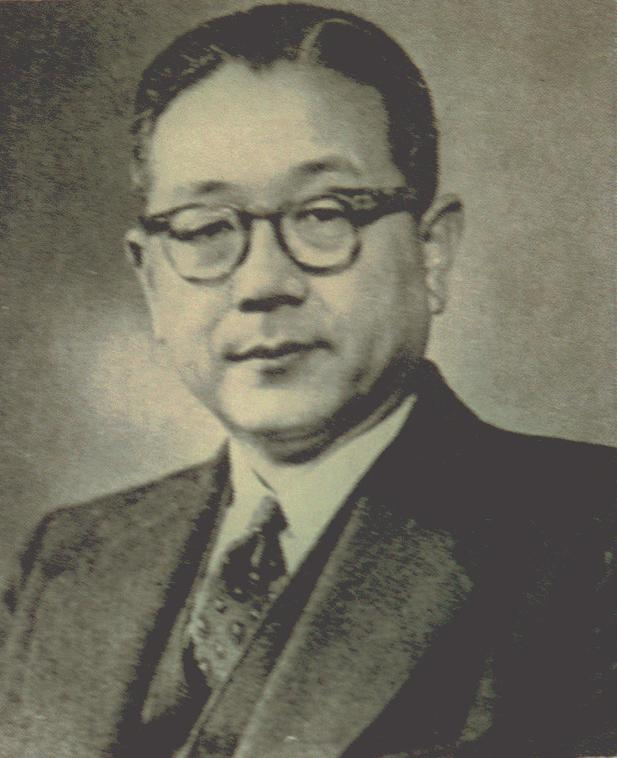
- Chang Myon
- Appointer: Direct election
- Term length: 4 years
- Precursor: None
- Formation: 24 July 1948
- First holder: Yi Si-yeong
- Final holder: Chang Myon
- Abolished: 15 June 1960

The Vice President of the Republic of Korea (Korean: 대한민국 부통령; RR: Daehanminguk butongnyeong) was the second highest executive office in South Korea. It was established upon South Korea's founding on 24 July 1948, and abolished in 1960.

The following is a list of vice presidents of South Korea since its independence.

To avoid confusion, all the names on this list follow the Eastern convention (family name first, given name second) for consistency.

== List of vice presidents of South Korea ==
No.	Portrait	Name (Birth–Death)	Term of office			Party	Election	President (Tenure)
No.	Portrait	Name (Birth–Death)	Took office	Left office	Time in office	Party	Election	President (Tenure)
1		Yi Si-yeong 이시영 李始榮 (1868–1953)	24 July 1948	14 May 1951	2 years, 294 days	National Association	1948	Syngman Rhee (1948–1960)
—		Chang Myon 장면 張勉 (1899–1966); Acting	14 May 1951	16 May 1951	2 days	Liberal	—	Syngman Rhee (1948–1960)
2		Kim Seong-su 김성수 金性洙 (1891–1955)	16 May 1951	28 June 1952	1 year, 43 days	Democratic Nationalist	1951	Syngman Rhee (1948–1960)
—		Chang Taek-sang 장택상 張澤相 (1893–1969); Acting	28 June 1952	14 August 1952	47 days	Independent	—	Syngman Rhee (1948–1960)
3		Ham Tae-young 함태영 咸台永 (1873–1964)	15 August 1952	14 August 1956	3 years, 365 days	Independent	1952	Syngman Rhee (1948–1960)
4		Chang Myon 장면 張勉 (1899–1966)	15 August 1956	25 April 1960	3 years, 252 days	Democratic (1955)	1956	Syngman Rhee (1948–1960)
—		Ho Chong (Note: Ho Chong served as Acting President from 27 April 1960.) 허정 許政 (1896–1988); Acting	25 April 1960	14 June 1960	52 days	Independent	—	Syngman Rhee (1948–1960)
—		Ho Chong 허정 許政 (1896–1988); Acting	25 April 1960	14 June 1960	52 days	Independent	—	Ho Chong (1960)
