= Ho Chong =

President of South Korea in 1960

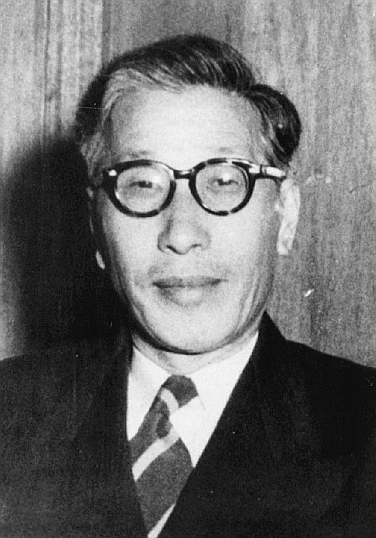
- Ho in 1957

Acting President of South Korea
- In office 27 April 1960 – 16 June 1960
- Prime Minister: Himself
- Vice President: Himself
- Preceded by: Syngman Rhee
- Succeeded by: Kwak Sang-hoon (acting)
- In office 22 June 1960 – 8 August 1960
- Prime Minister: Himself
- Vice President: Position abolished
- Preceded by: Kwak Sang-hoon (acting)
- Succeeded by: Baek Nak-jun (acting)

6th Prime Minister of South Korea
- In office 6 November 1951 – 9 April 1952 (acting)
- President: Syngman Rhee
- Vice President: Kim Seong-su
- Preceded by: Chang Myon
- Succeeded by: Yi Yun-yong (acting)
- In office 15 June 1960 – 18 August 1960
- President: Himself
- Preceded by: Pyon Yong-tae; Baek Han-seong (acting)
- Succeeded by: Chang Myon

8th Mayor of Seoul
- In office 14 December 1957 – 11 June 1959
- President: Syngman Rhee
- Prime Minister: Position abolished
- Vice President: Chang Myon
- Preceded by: Goh Chaebong
- Succeeded by: Yim Heung Soon

Acting Vice President of South Korea
- In office 25 April 1960 – 14 June 1960
- President: Himself
- Prime Minister: Himself
- Preceded by: Chang Myon
- Succeeded by: Position abolished

Personal details
- Born: 8 April 1896 Busan, Joseon
- Died: 18 September 1988 (aged 92) Seoul, South Korea
- Party: Democratic Party
- Spouse: Baek Gui-Ran
- Education: Bosung College

Korean name
- Hangul: 허정
- Hanja: 許政
- RR: Heo Jeong
- MR: Hŏ Chŏng

Art name
- Hangul: 우양
- Hanja: 友洋
- RR: Uyang
- MR: Uyang

Ho Chong (Korean: 허정; 8 April 1896 – 18 September 1988) was a South Korean politician and Korean independence activist who served as the prime minister of South Korea during the country's Second Republic. He also served as the acting president of South Korea in 1960 following the April Revolution that overthrew the First Republic. Ho was known by his art name Uyang (우양; lit. 'friend of the seas').

== Early life and education ==
Ho Chong was born in Busan, South Gyeongsang Province. His father, Ho Mun-il, was a wealthy merchant (yangban). He attended Choryangsa Elementary School in Busan and later moved to Seoul to attend Bosung High School (now Korea University High School). He graduated from Bosung College (now Korea University) with a degree in commerce. Ho also studied at Wusong Maritime School in Shanghai, China, Nanjing Navigation University in China, and the University of London's School of Navigation in the United Kingdom.

== Independence movement ==
In 1919, Ho participated in the March 1st Movement for Korean independence. Following this, he went into political exile, where he assisted Syngman Rhee. From 1922 to 1936, Ho was involved in Korean resistance movements against Japanese colonial rule. He served as a member of the Provisional Government of the Republic of Korea and worked in its US diplomatic office.

While in the United States, Ho was active in the Korean-American community. He served as president of the Korean Students Association in New York and as the head of the Korean Residents Association in North America. In 1923, he became the president of the Korean-American newspaper "Samil Shinbo" (삼일신보).

== Political career ==
=== Early political involvement ===
On 2 September 1945, Ho joined the Korea Democratic Party. He was elected to the Constitutional Assembly in the May 1948 election, representing Busan.

=== First Republic ===
During the First Republic of South Korea, Ho held several ministerial positions:

- Minister of Transportation (1948–1950)

- Minister of Social Affairs (1950–1952)

- Acting Prime Minister (1951)

He also served as the 8th Mayor of Seoul from 1957 to 1959.

=== April Revolution and Second Republic ===
Following the April Revolution of 1960 that led to the resignation of President Syngman Rhee, Ho Chong became Acting President of South Korea on 27 April 1960. He served in this capacity until 12 August 1960. During this period, he also held the position of Prime Minister from 15 June 1960, to 18 August 1960.

As Acting President, Ho worked to stabilize the country and prepare for the transition to the Second Republic of South Korea. He advocated for a "non-revolutionary implementation of revolutionary goals," aiming to address the demands of the April Revolution while maintaining social order.

=== Later political activities ===
After leaving office, Ho remained active in politics. He was involved in various political parties, including:

- The Democratic Party (민주당)

- The People's Party (국민의당)

- The Minjung Party (민중당)

In 1963, Ho ran for president but withdrew his candidacy to support a unified opposition candidate. He continued to be a prominent figure in South Korean politics, often serving as a mediator between different political factions.

=== Role during the Third and Fourth Republics ===
During the Third Republic under Park Chung Hee, Ho initially opposed the military government. However, he later took on advisory roles, serving as a consultant to the Ministry of Unification from 1969 to 1979.

After the assassination of Park Chung Hee in 1979, Ho was appointed a member of the National Affairs Advisory Council under the Choi Kyu-hah administration.

== Political views and legacy ==
Ho Chong was known for his moderate political stance and his efforts to maintain stability during times of political upheaval. He advocated for a gradual approach to implementing democratic reforms, which sometimes put him at odds with more radical elements of the opposition.

=== Views on labor unions ===
Ho was notably opposed to the formation of labor unions for civil servants and teachers. During his time as Acting President in 1960, he took a firm stance against the emerging teachers' union movement, arguing that civil servants and educators should be distinct from general laborers.

=== Perspective on the April Revolution ===
In his later years, Ho referred to the April Revolution as an "incident" (사태) rather than a revolution, emphasizing that it was a righteous uprising to protect democracy rather than a fundamental change in the political system.

== Personal life ==
Ho was married twice. His first marriage ended in divorce after a long period of separation due to his studies abroad. In 1932, he remarried to Baek Gui-Ran, a music teacher at Ewha Womans University.

== Honors and awards ==
Ho received several honors throughout his life, including:

- The Inchon Culture Prize

- An honorary doctorate in law from Korea University in 1975

- The Order of Civil Merit (Blue Stripes) in 1988

== Death and burial ==
Ho Chong died on 18 September 1988, in Seoul, South Korea. He was buried at the Seoul National Cemetery in Dongjak District, Seoul.

== Published works ==
Ho Chong authored a memoir titled "Testimony for Tomorrow" (내일을 위한 증언), published in 1979, which provides insights into his political career and the historical events he witnessed.

== Legacy ==
Ho Chong is remembered as a significant figure in South Korean politics during the tumultuous period of the country's early democratic development. His role in stabilizing the country after the April Revolution and his efforts to mediate between different political factions have been recognized by historians. However, his stance on labor unions and his later cooperation with authoritarian governments have also been subjects of criticism.

In popular culture, Ho Chong has been portrayed in several South Korean television dramas and films about the country's modern history.

Political offices
| Preceded by Syngman Rhee | President of South Korea; 1960; Acting | Succeeded by Kwak Sang-hoon; Acting |
| Preceded by Chang Myon | Prime Minister of South Korea; 1952 | Succeeded by Yi Yun-yong; Acting |
| Preceded by Goh Chaebong | Mayor of Seoul; 1959 | Succeeded by Yim Heung Soon; Acting |
