= Kim Seong-su =

1951–1952 Vice President of South Korea

His Excellency Kim Seong-su
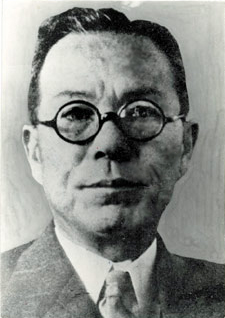

2nd Vice President of South Korea
- In office May 16, 1951 – June 28, 1952
- President: Syngman Rhee
- Prime Minister: Ho Chong; Yi Yun-yong (acting)
- Preceded by: Yi Si-yeong
- Succeeded by: Chang Taek-sang (acting)

Personal details
- Born: October 11, 1891 Gochang, Jeolla Province, Joseon
- Died: February 18, 1955 (aged 63) Seoul, South Korea
- Party: Korea Democratic Party
- Education: Waseda University

Korean name
- Hangul: 김성수
- Hanja: 金性洙
- RR: Gim Seongsu
- MR: Kim Sŏngsu

Art name
- Hangul: 인촌
- Hanja: 仁村
- RR: Inchon
- MR: Inch'on

Courtesy name
- Hangul: 판석
- Hanja: 判錫
- RR: Panseok
- MR: P'ansŏk

Kim Seong-su (Korean: 김성수; Hanja: 金性洙; October 11, 1891 – February 18, 1955), art name Inchon, was a Korean educator, independence activist, journalist, entrepreneur, politician, and calligrapher. He served as the second Vice President of South Korea from 1951 to 1952. Kim Seong-su founded Korea University and The Dong-A Ilbo. He graduated from Waseda University in Tokyo, Japan, majoring in Political Science and Economics.

== Early life and education ==
Kim was born in Gochang County, North Jeolla Province, Joseon. He graduated from Waseda University in Japan in 1914. From 1897, Kim Seong-su studied under Han Hak-ju. In 1904, he married Go Kwang-seok (高光錫), the daughter of Go Jeong-ju, a resident of Changpyeong in Jeollanam-do. In 1906, he spent six months learning English at the Yeonghaksuk (英學塾) in Changpyeong, where his in-laws lived, together with Song Jin-woo (宋鎭禹). In 1908, Kim Seong-su attended Geumho School (錦湖學校) in Gunsan and then enrolled in Seisoku English School in Tokyo, Japan, in October of that year. The following year, in April 1909, he transferred to the fifth grade of Kinjo Middle School in Tokyo. After graduating in 1910, he entered the preparatory course of Waseda University in April of the same year and then chose the Political Economics department, graduating in 1914. Upon returning to Korea, with the support of his stepfather Kim Gi-jung, Kim Seong-su took over the management rights of Central School in April 1915 after repaying its debts. In March 1917, he elevated Central School to a regular educational institution and assumed the position of principal. In the same year, he acquired Kyungsung Jiknyu Joint Stock Company and began a textile business. He resigned from his position as principal of Central School in March 1918 to focus on business management, but facing decline, he began the establishment of Kyungsung Spinning. Kim Seong-su participated in the early planning stages of the March 1st Movement in 1919. In October that year, he received authorization to establish Kyungsung Spinning.

=== Childhood ===
During his childhood, Kim Seong-su studied various classical texts at a private school. These texts included "Mingxin baojian", "Sohak" (小學), and "Tongmong sŏnsŭp". He continued his education with texts like the "Zizhi Tongjian," the teachings of Confucius and Mencius, and Chinese history. He also studied Tang poetry, Confucian philosophy, and Neo-Confucianism. Personally, he enjoyed reading historical texts like Sima Qian's "Records of the Grand Historian" and the "Three Kingdoms." Although he grew up in a wealthy family, he did not indulge in luxury.

== Career ==
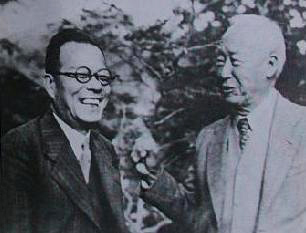
Kim with Syngman Rhee, 1951

Following his tenure as principal of a boys' secondary school in Seoul, Kim Seong-su, along with his brothers, established the Seoul Spinning and Weaving Company in 1919. This venture was soon followed by the establishment of The Dong-a Ilbo and other Korean-language publications in the early 1920s. In the 1930s, Kim became the president of Bosung College, and in 1947, he played a key role in the formation of the Korean (Hanguk) Democratic Party, which later merged to form the Democratic Party in 1949. In 1951, he was elected as the vice president, succeeding Yi Si-yeong, but resigned from the role in 1952. After resigning, he returned to the business sector, where he had worked before Korean independence.

In July 1921, Kim was elected as a committee member for the inaugural meeting of the Joseon Industrial Conference. In September of the same year, he became actively involved in The Dong-a Ilbo newspaper as it transitioned to a joint-stock company. Starting in November 1922, he spearheaded the Goods Encouragement Movement through The Dong-A Ilbo.

In March 1923, he participated actively in the campaign to establish a national university in Korea, being appointed as a custodian for the membership fees of the Joseon Minrip University Foundation Association. He resigned from his position at The Dong-a Ilbo in April 1924 but returned in September as an advisor, eventually assuming the roles of President, executive director, and managing director in October. He resigned from these positions in October 1927 and left his directorship at Kyungsung Spinning in March 1928.

In February 1929, Kim, along with seven others including his stepfather Kim Gi-jung, established the Central Institute (중앙학원), a foundation corporation, with a capital of 600,000 won. He took on the role of principal at Central High School in September 1931. In March 1932, he acquired the financially struggling Boseong Professional School and served as its principal until June 1935.

In March 1935, Kim was appointed as the director and board member of the Joseon Commemorative Book Publishing Office. In November, he was named a director of the Sodohoe (昭道會), an organization created by Gyeonggi Province for the ideological guidance and reformation of ideological offenders. In November 1936, he stepped down from his position at The Dong-A Ilbo due to the fallout from the 'Rising Sun Flag Incident'.

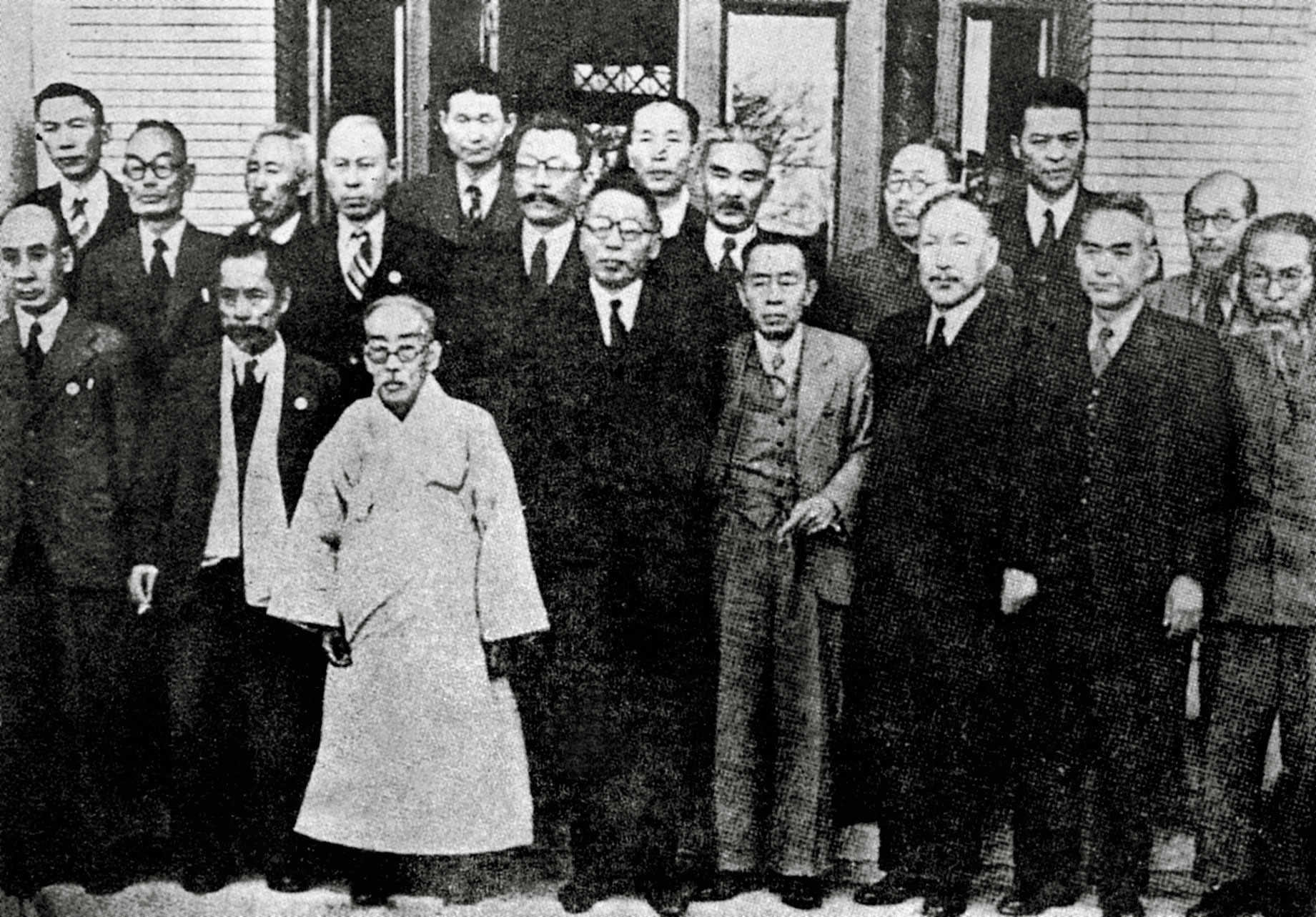
December 3, 1945. A photograph commemorating the return of the Provisional Government leaders with Kim Seong-su included

He became the principal of Boseong Professional School again in May 1937 and played a pivotal role in founding Korea University, originally coined as "Ethnic Korean's Korea University" (민족고대). After liberation, Kim Seong-su was approached by patriotic activists to join the newly formed Korean Democratic Party but initially declined. However, after the assassination of Song Jin-woo in December 1945, he reluctantly accepted the position of senior secretary (party leader) of the Hanmin Party due to strong persuasion from his peers. In August 1946, Kim Seong-su established Korea University, building upon the foundation of Bosung Professional School, thereby laying the groundwork for a national private educational institution. In May 1951, he was elected as the second Vice President in the provisional capital of Busan. However, due to irreconcilable differences with President Syngman Rhee, he resigned from the position after just one year.

== Death ==
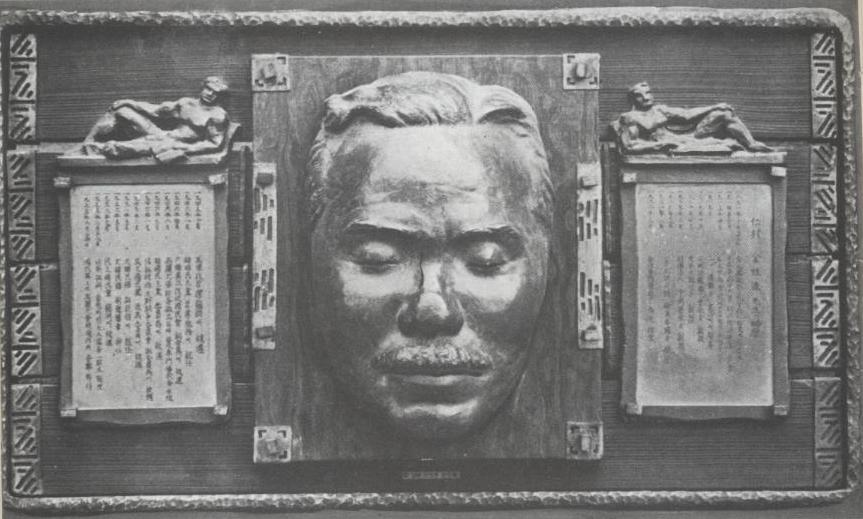
Kim's death mask

Kim died in 1955.

== Inchon Award ==
The Inchon Memorial Association and Dong-A Ilbo Foundation founded the Inchon Award in 1987 to honor the memory of "Inchon" Kim Seong-su.

Political offices
Preceded by Lee Si-yeong	Vice President of South Korea; 1951–1952	Succeeded by Ham Tae-young
