= Ihwajang =

Former South Korean presidential residence

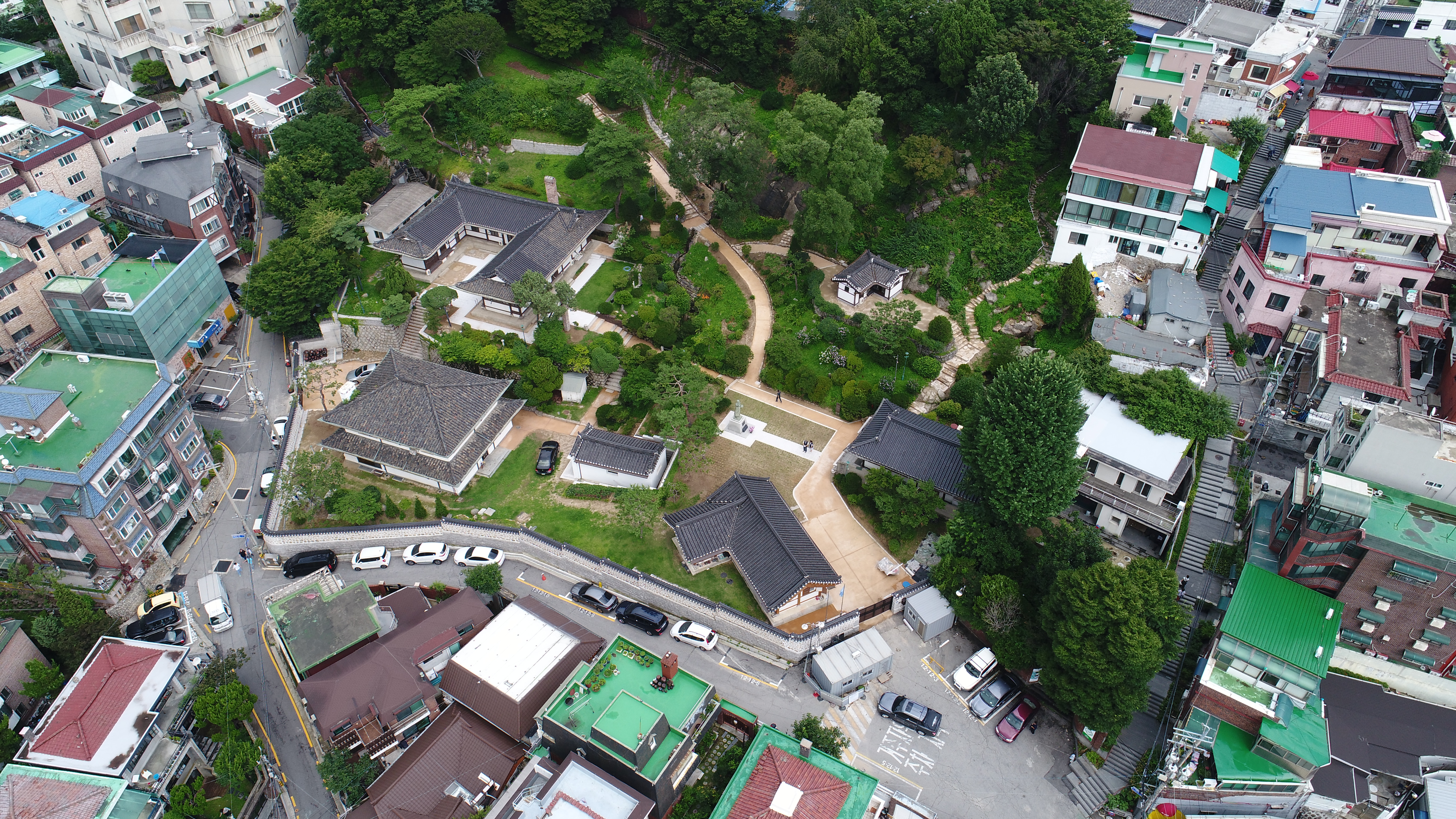
- The house complex in 2018
- Interactive map of the Ihwajang area

General information
- Location: 32 Ihwajang 1-gil, Jongno District, Seoul, South Korea
- Coordinates: 37.578333°N 127.006389°E

Technical details
- Grounds: 6,571 m^{2} (70,730 ft^{2})

Design and construction
- Designations

Historic Sites of South Korea
- Official name: Ihwajang House, Seoul
- Designated: 2009-04-28
- Reference no.: 497

Ihwajang (Korean: 이화장; Hanja: 梨花莊) is a historic home in Jongno District, Seoul, South Korea. It is the former residence of the first President of South Korea, Syngman Rhee. It was designated a historic site of South Korea on April 28, 2009. It is open to visitors as a memorial hall to Rhee.

It consists of several buildings in a complex. A number of different people lived in this area, including Joseon scholar Shin Gwang-han in the 16th century and Grand Prince Inpyeong in the 17th century. It has consistently been considered a scenic area to live, with many visitors admiring the scenery.

During much of the Japanese colonial period, Rhee lived in exile in the United States. After Korea was liberated in 1945, Rhee returned to the peninsula and took up residence here.
