= Pyon Yong-tae =

South Korean politician (1892–1969)

His Excellency Pyone Young Tae
- 변영태
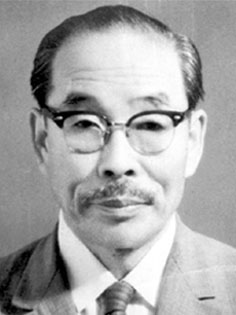

5th Prime Minister of South Korea
- In office June 27, 1954 – November 28, 1954
- President: Syngman Rhee
- Prime Minister: (Himself)
- Vice President: Ham Tae-young
- Preceded by: Baek Du-jin
- Succeeded by: Position abolished Himself (As Chief State Councilor); Heo Jeong (Second Republic of Korea); Baek Han-seong (acting)

Chief State Councilor
- In office November 30, 1954 – July 28, 1955
- President: Syngman Rhee
- Vice President: Ham Tae-young
- Preceded by: Position Established
- Succeeded by: Kim Hyung-geun (Acting); Kim Hyun-chul

Personal details
- Born: December 15, 1892 Sinch'ŏn, Hwanghae Province, Joseon
- Died: March 10, 1969 (aged 76) Seoul, South Korea
- Party: Liberal

Korean name
- Hangul: 변영태
- Hanja: 卞榮泰
- RR: Byeon Yeongtae
- MR: Pyŏn Yŏngt'ae
- Also spelled Pyun Young-tae

Pyone Young-tae or Byeon Yeong-tae (Korean: 변영태; December 15, 1892 – March 10, 1969) was a South Korean politician who served as the fifth prime minister of South Korea from June to November 1954 and as the minister of foreign affairs from 1951 to 1955.

As minister of foreign affairs, Pyone signed the Mutual Defense Treaty between the United States and South Korea on August 8, 1953. Pyone served as prime minister for the first Republic of Korea for five months before the position was abolished on November 28, 1954. The position was restored in 1960 under the second Republic of Korea.

Preceded by Baek Du-jin	5th Prime Minister of South Korea; 1954	Succeeded by Heo Jeong (after position was restored)
