= Syngman Rhee =

President of South Korea from 1948 to 1960

- 이승만
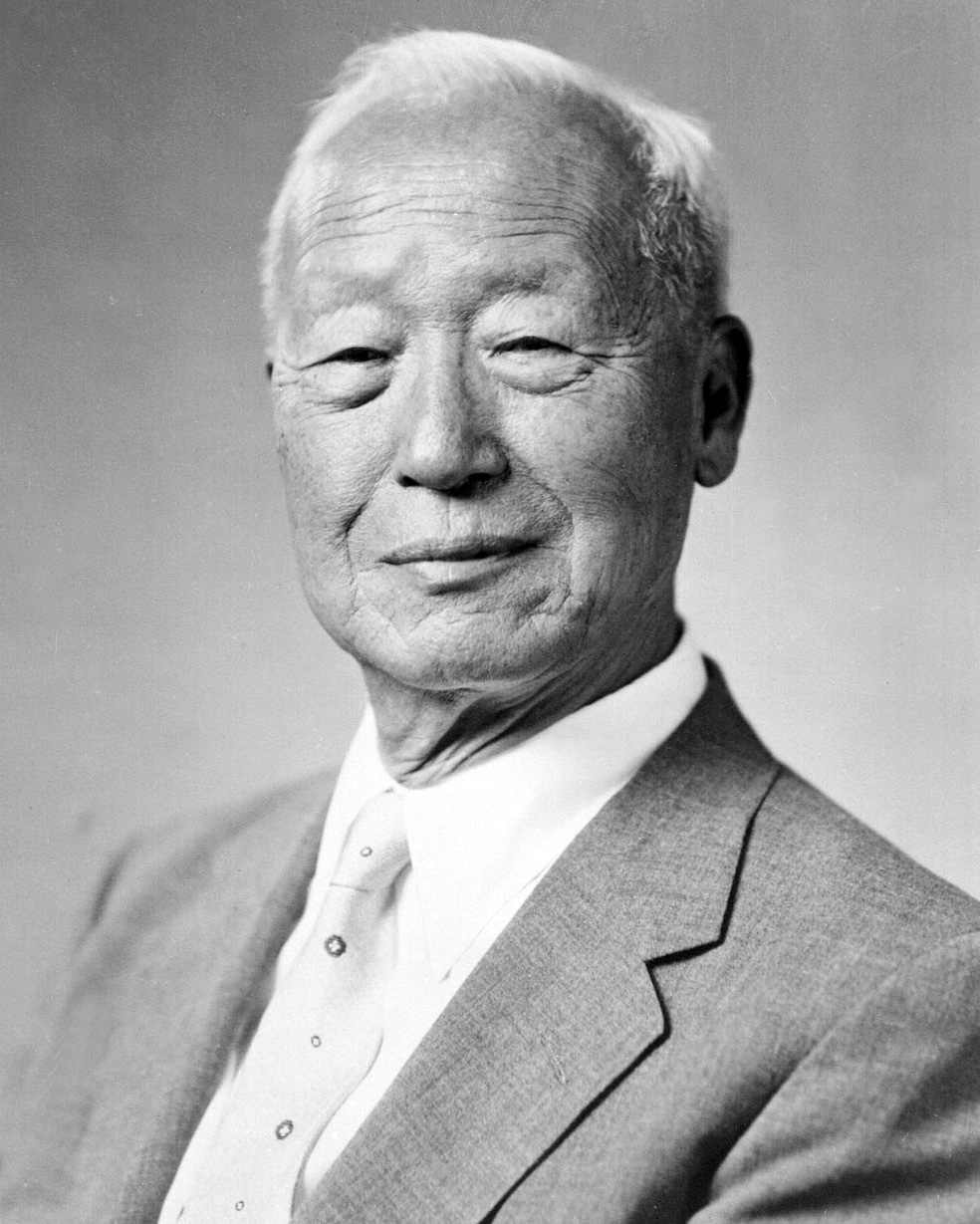
- Official portrait, 1948

1st President of South Korea
- In office 24 July 1948 – 27 April 1960
- Prime Minister: See list: Lee Beom-seok; Shin Song-mo (acting); Chang Myon; Ho Chong (acting); Yi Yun-yong (acting); Chang Taek-sang; Paik Too-chin; Pyon Yong-tae; Baek Han-seong (acting); Ho Chong (acting)
- Vice President: Yi Si-yeong; Kim Seong-su; Ham Tae-young; Chang Myon
- Preceded by: Office established
- Succeeded by: Ho Chong (acting); Kwak Sang-hoon (acting); Ho Chong (acting); Baek Nak-jun (acting); Yun Po-sun

1st Speaker of the National Assembly
- In office 31 May 1948 – 24 July 1948
- Deputy: Sin Ik-hui
- Preceded by: Office established (Note: Kim Kyu-sik as Chairman of the Interim Legislative Assembly)
- Succeeded by: Sin Ik-hui

Chairman of the State Council of the Korean Provisional Government
- In office 3 March 1947 – 15 August 1948
- Deputy: Kim Ku
- Preceded by: Kim Ku
- Succeeded by: Office abolished

President of the People's Republic of Korea
- In office 6 September 1945 – 19 February 1946
- Vice President: Lyuh Woon-hyung
- Preceded by: Office established
- Succeeded by: Office abolished

President of the Korean Provisional Government
- In office 11 September 1919 – 23 March 1925
- Prime Minister: Yi Tonghwi; Yi Tongnyŏng; Sin Kyusik; No Paengnin; Pak Ŭnsik
- Preceded by: Office established
- Succeeded by: Pak Ŭnsik

Personal details
- Born: Rhee Syngryong; 26 March 1875 Pyongsan County, Hwanghae, Joseon
- Died: 19 July 1965 (aged 90) Honolulu, Hawaii, U.S.
- Resting place: Seoul National Cemetery
- Citizenship: Joseon (until 1897); Korean Empire (1897–1910); Stateless (1910–1948); South Korea (from 1948)
- Party: Liberal (1951–1961)
- Other political affiliations: National Association (1946–1951); People's Joint Association (1897–1899)
- Spouses: Seungseon Park (m. 1891; div. ) Franziska Donner (m. 1934)
- Education: George Washington University (BA); Harvard University (MA); Princeton University (PhD)

Korean name
- Hangul: 이승만
- Hanja: 李承晩
- RR: I Seungman
- MR: I Sŭngman

Art name
- Hangul: 우남
- Hanja: 雩南
- RR: Unam
- MR: Unam

Birth name
- Hangul: 이승룡
- RR: I Seungryong
- MR: I Sŭngnyong
- Syngman Rhee's voice Rhee on the Korean War; Recorded 28 July 1954

Syngman Rhee (Note: Korean: 이승만; Hanja: 李承晚; RR: I Seungman; pronounced [iː.sɯŋ.man] (Note: See North–South differences in the Korean language § Consonants.)) (born Rhee Syngryong; (Note: Korean: 이승룡. In this Korean name, the family name is Rhee.) 26 March 1875 – 19 July 1965), also known by his art name Unam, (Note: Korean: 우남; Hanja: 雩南) was a South Korean politician who served as the first President of South Korea from 1948 until his resignation in 1960. His administration was characterised by authoritarianism, limited economic development, and in the late 1950s growing political instability and public opposition to his rule. Rhee previously was the first president of the Provisional Government of the Republic of Korea from 1919 until his impeachment in 1925 and again as the last president from 1947 to 1948.

Born in Hwanghae Province during the Joseon period, Rhee attended a local Methodist school, where he converted to Christianity. He became a Korean independence activist and was imprisoned for his activities in 1899. After his release in 1904, he moved to the United States, where he received degrees from American universities and met Presidents Theodore Roosevelt and Woodrow Wilson. After a brief 1910–12 return to Korea, he moved to Hawaii in 1913. In 1919, following the Japanese suppression of the March First Movement, Rhee joined the right-leaning Korean Provisional Government in exile in Shanghai. From 1918 to 1924, he served as the first President of the Korean Provisional Government until 1925. He then returned to the United States, where he advocated and fundraised for Korean independence. In 1945, he returned to US-controlled Korea. On 20 July 1948, he was elected the first president of the Republic of Korea by the National Assembly, ushering in the First Republic of Korea.

As president, Rhee continued his hardline anti-communist and pro-American views that characterized much of his earlier political career. Rhee was president during the outbreak of the Korean War (1950–1953), in which North Korea invaded South Korea. He refused to sign the armistice agreement that ended the war, wishing to have the peninsula reunited by force.

After the fighting ended, South Korea's economy lagged behind North Korea's and was heavily reliant on US aid, despite successful efforts to battle illiteracy. After being re-elected in 1956, he pushed to modify the constitution to remove the two-term limit, despite opposition protests. He was reelected uncontested in March 1960, after his opponent Chough Pyung-ok died from cancer before the election took place. After Rhee's ally Lee Ki-poong won the corresponding vice-presidential election by a wide margin, the opposition rejected the result as rigged, which triggered protests. These escalated into the student-led April Revolution, in which police shot demonstrators in Masan. The resulting scandal caused Rhee to resign on 26 April, ushering in the Second Republic of Korea. Following his resignation, he spent a month at the residence Ihwajang and departed for exile in Hawaii by plane on 29 May. However, according to Rhee, he went to Hawaii for medical treatment. Rhee claimed that he was never in exile – he simply was not able to return to his homeland. He spent the rest of his life in exile in Honolulu, Hawaii, and died of a stroke in 1965.

== Early life and career ==
=== Early life ===
Syngman Rhee was born on 26 March 1875 in Daegyeong, a village in Pyeongsan County, Hwanghae Province, Joseon as Rhee Syngryong (이승룡). Rhee was the third but only surviving son out of three brothers and two sisters (his two older brothers both died in infancy) in a rural family of modest means. Rhee's family traced its lineage back to King Taejong of Joseon. He was a 16th-generation descendant of Grand Prince Yangnyeong through his second son, Yi Heun who was known as Jangpyeong Dojeong (장평도정; 長平都正). This case makes him a distant relative of the mid-Joseon military officer Yi Sun-sin (not be confused with Admiral Yi Sun-sin). His mother was a member of Gimhae Kim clan.

In 1877, at the age of two, Rhee and his family moved to Seoul, where he had traditional Confucian education in various seodang in Nakdong (낙동; 駱洞) and Dodong (도동; 桃洞). When Rhee was six years old a smallpox infection rendered him virtually blind until he was treated with western medicine, possibly by a Japanese doctor. Rhee was portrayed as a potential candidate for the gwageo, the traditional Korean civil service examination, but in 1894 reforms abolished the gwageo system, and in April he enrolled in the Paechae School, an American Methodist school, where he converted to Christianity. Rhee studied English and sinhakmun (신학문; 新學問; lit. 'new subjects'). Near the end of 1895, he joined a Hyeopseong (Mutual Friendship) Club (협성회; 協成會) created by Philip Jaisohn, who returned from the United States after his exile following the Kapsin Coup. He worked as the head and the main writer of the newspapers Hyŏpsŏnghoe hoebo and Maeil sinmun, the latter being the first daily newspaper in Korea. During this period, Rhee earned money by teaching the Korean language to Americans. In 1895, Rhee graduated from Pai Chai School.

=== Independence activities ===
Rhee became involved in anti-Japanese circles after the end of the First Sino-Japanese War in 1895, which saw Joseon passed from the Chinese sphere of influence to the Japanese. Rhee was implicated in a plot to take revenge for the assassination of Empress Myeongseong, the wife of King Gojong who was assassinated by Japanese agents (known in Korean history as the Chunsaengmun incident); however, a female American physician Georgiana E. Whiting helped him avoid the charges by disguising him as her patient and to go to his sister's house. Rhee became one of the forerunners of the Korean independence movement through grassroots organizations such as the Hyeopseong Club and the Independence Club. Rhee organized several protests against corruption and the influences of the Japan and the Russian Empire. As a result, in November 1898, Rhee attained the rank of Uigwan (의관; 議官) in the Imperial Legislature, the Jungchuwon (중추원; 中樞院).

After entering civil service, Rhee was implicated in a plot to remove King Gojong from power through the recruitment of Pak Yŏnghyo. As a result, Rhee was imprisoned in the Gyeongmucheong Prison (경무청; 警務廳) in January 1899. Other sources place the year arrested as 1897 and 1898. Rhee attempted to escape on the 20th day of imprisonment but was caught and was sentenced to life imprisonment through the Pyeongniwon (평리원; 平理院). He was imprisoned in the Hanseong Prison (한성감옥서; 漢城監獄署). In prison, Rhee translated and compiled The Sino–Japanese War Record (청일전기; 淸日戰紀), wrote The Spirit of Independence (독립정신; 獨立精神), compiled the New English–Korean Dictionary (신영한사전; 新英韓辭典) and wrote in the Imperial Newspaper (제국신문; 帝國新聞). He was also tortured. Examples of this included Japanese officers lighting oil paper which were pushed up his fingernails, and then smashing them one-by-one.

=== Political activities at home and abroad ===
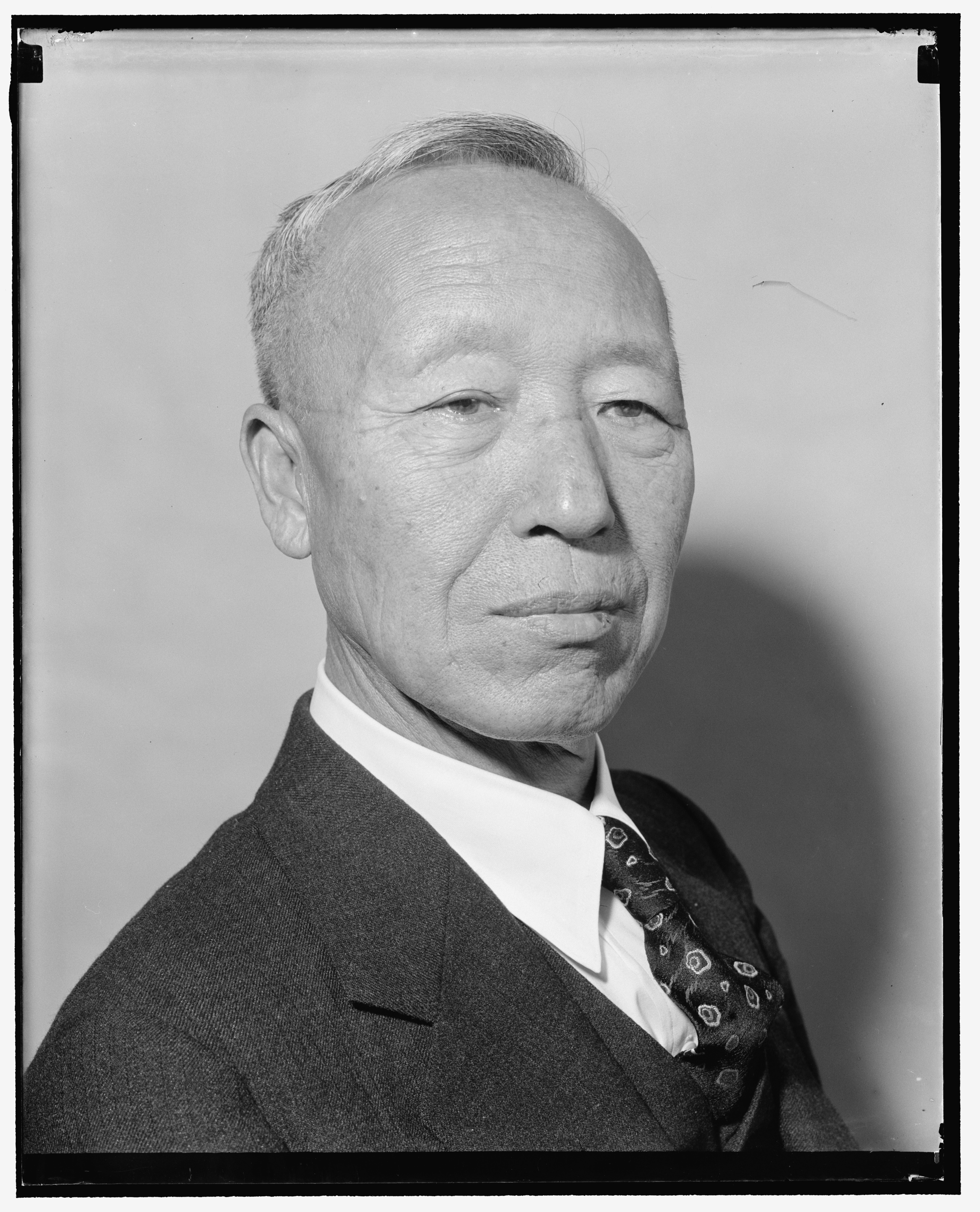
Rhee's Library of Congress print, 1939

In 1904, Rhee was released from prison at the outbreak of the Russo-Japanese War with the help of Min Young-hwan. In November 1904, with the help of Min Yeong-hwan and Han Gyu-seol (한규설; 韓圭卨), Rhee moved to the United States. In August 1905, Rhee and Yun Byeong-gu (윤병구; 尹炳求) met with US President Theodore Roosevelt at peace talks in Portsmouth, New Hampshire and attempted unsuccessfully to convince the US to help preserve independence for Korea.

Rhee continued to stay in the United States; this move has been described as an "exile". He obtained a Bachelor of Arts from George Washington University in 1907, and a Master of Arts from Harvard University in 1908. In 1910, he obtained a PhD from Princeton University with the thesis "Neutrality as influenced by the United States" (미국의 영향하에 발달된 국제법상 중립).

In August 1910, Rhee returned to Japanese-occupied Korea. (Note: In 1910, the Korean Peninsula was officially annexed by the Empire of Japan.) He served as a YMCA coordinator and missionary. In 1912, Rhee was implicated in the 105-Man Incident, and was shortly arrested. However, he fled to the United States in 1912 with M. C. Harris's rationale that Rhee was going to participate in the general meeting of Methodists in Minneapolis as the Korean representative. (Note: He did participate in the meeting as the Korean representative.)

In the United States, Rhee attempted to convince Woodrow Wilson to help the people involved in the 105-Man Incident, but failed to bring any change. Soon afterwards, he met Park Yong-man, who was in Nebraska at the time. In February 1913, as a consequence of the meeting, he moved to Honolulu, Hawaii, and took over the Han-in Jung-ang Academy (한인중앙학원; 韓人中央學園). In Hawaii, he began to publish the Pacific Ocean Magazine (태평양잡지; 太平洋雜誌). In 1918, he established the Han-in Christian Church (한인기독교회; 韓人基督敎會). During this period, he opposed Park Yong-man's stance on foreign relations of Korea and brought about a split in the community. In December 1918, he was chosen, along with Dr. Henry Chung DeYoung, as a Korean representative to the Paris Peace Conference in 1919 by the Korean National Association but they failed to obtain permission to travel to Paris. After giving up travelling to Paris, Rhee held the First Korean Congress in Philadelphia with Seo Jae-pil to make plans for future political activism concerning Korean independence.

Following the March First Movement in March 1919, Rhee discovered that he was appointed to the positions of foreign minister for the Korean National Assembly (a group in Vladivostok), prime minister for the Provisional Government of the Republic of Korea in Shanghai, and a position equivalent to president for the Hanseong Provisional Government. In June, in the acting capacity of the President of the Republic of Korea, he notified the prime ministers and the chairmen of peace conferences of Korea's independence. On 25 August, Rhee established the Korean Commission to America and Europe (구미위원부; 歐美委員部) in Washington, DC. On 6 September, Rhee discovered that he had been appointed acting president for the Provisional Government in Shanghai. From December 1920 to May 1921, he moved to Shanghai and was the acting president for the Provisional Government.

However, Rhee failed to efficiently act in the capacity of Acting President due to conflicts inside the provisional government in Shanghai. In October 1920, he returned to the US to participate in the Washington Naval Conference. During the conference, he attempted to set the problem of Korean independence as part of the agenda and campaigned for independence but was unsuccessful. In September 1922, he returned to Hawaii to focus on publication, education, and religion. In November 1924, Rhee was appointed the position of president for life in the Korean Comrade Society (대한인동지회; 大韓人同志會).

In March 1925, Rhee was impeached as the president of the Provisional Government in Shanghai over allegations of misuse of power and was removed from office. Nevertheless, he continued to claim the position of president by referring to the Hanseong Provisional Government and continued independence activities through the Korean Commission to America and Europe. In the beginning of 1933, he participated in the League of Nations conference in Geneva to bring up the question of Korean independence.

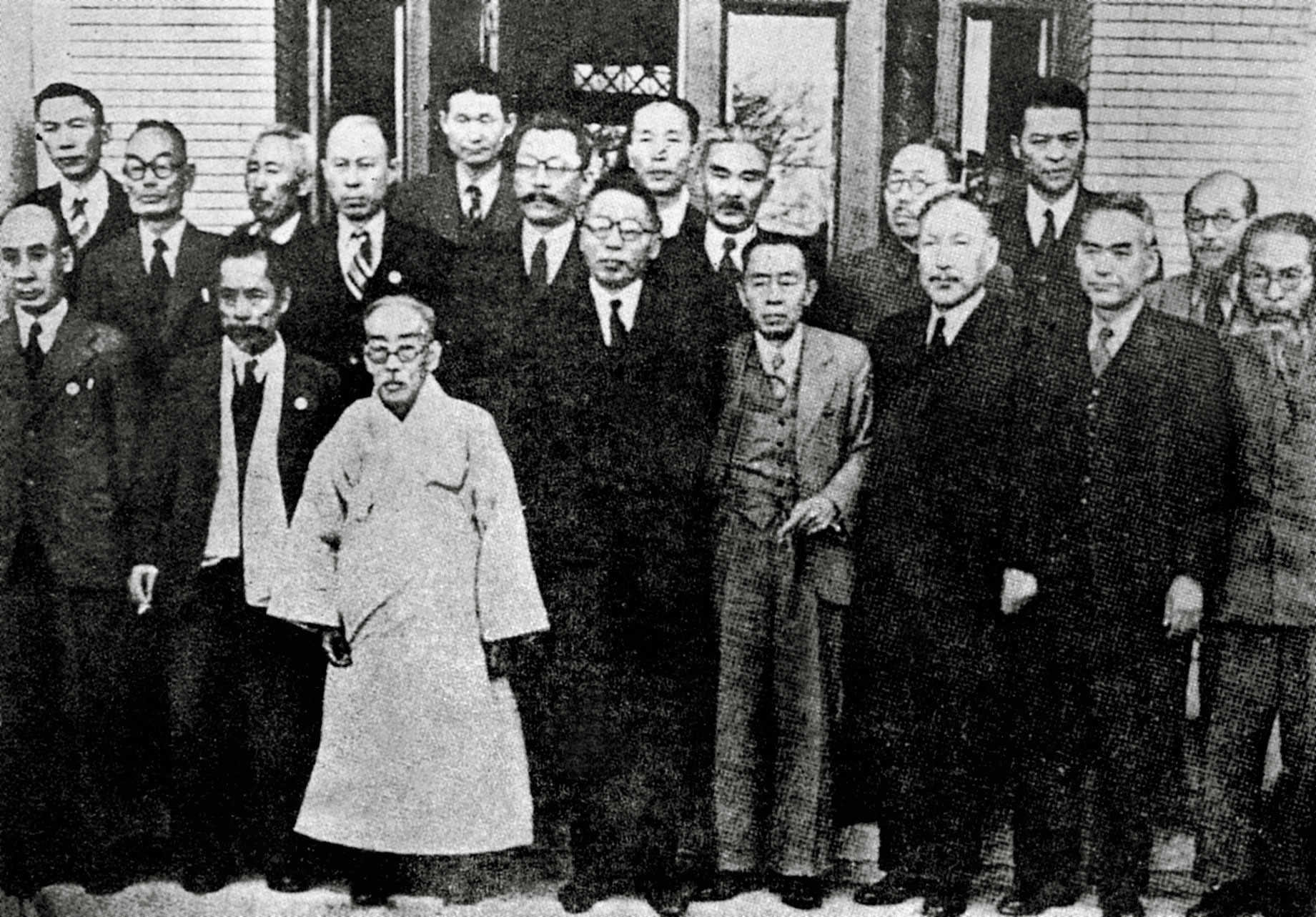
December 3, 1945. A photograph commemorating the return of the Provisional Government leaders with Syngman Rhee included

In November 1939, Rhee and his wife left Hawaii for Washington, DC. He focused on writing the book Japan Inside Out and published it during the summer of 1941. With the attack on Pearl Harbor and the consequent Pacific War, which began in December 1941, Rhee used his position as the chairman of the foreign relations department of the provisional government in Chongqing to convince President Franklin D. Roosevelt and the United States Department of State to approve the existence of the Korean provisional government. As part of this plan, he cooperated with anti-Japan strategies conducted by the US Office of Strategic Services (OSS). In 1945, he participated in the United Nations Conference on International Organization as the leader of the Korean representatives to request the participation of the Korean provisional government.

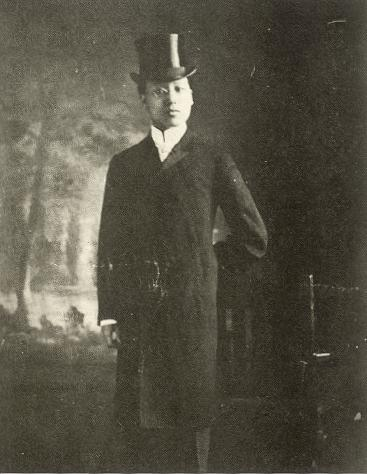
Rhee in 1905 dressed to meet Theodore Roosevelt

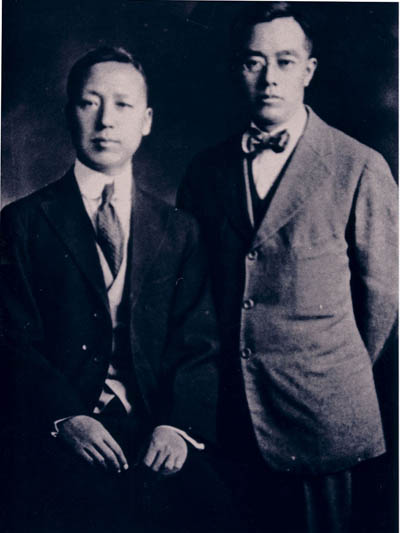
Rhee and Vice President of the Korean Provisional Government Kim Kyu-sik in 1919

== Presidency (1948–1960) ==
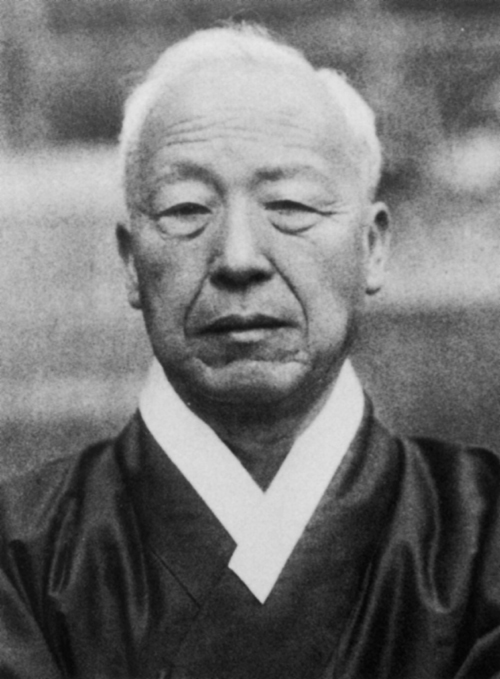
- Presidency of Syngman Rhee; 24 July 1948 – 27 April 1960
- Vice President: Yi Si-yeong; Kim Seong-su; Ham Tae-young; Chang Myon
- Prime Minister: Lee Beom-seok; Shin Song-mo (acting); Chang Myon; Ho Chong (acting); Yi Yun-yong (acting); Chang Taek-sang; Paik Too-chin; Pyon Yong-tae; Baek Han-seong (acting); Ho Chong
- Cabinet: Full list
- Party: National Association (1948–1951); Liberal (1951–1960)
- Seat: Seoul
- First term 24 July 1948 – 15 August 1948
- Election: 1948
- Constituency: USAMGIK
- Second term 15 August 1948 – 27 April 1960
- Election: 1952; 1956; March 1960
- Constituency: First Republic

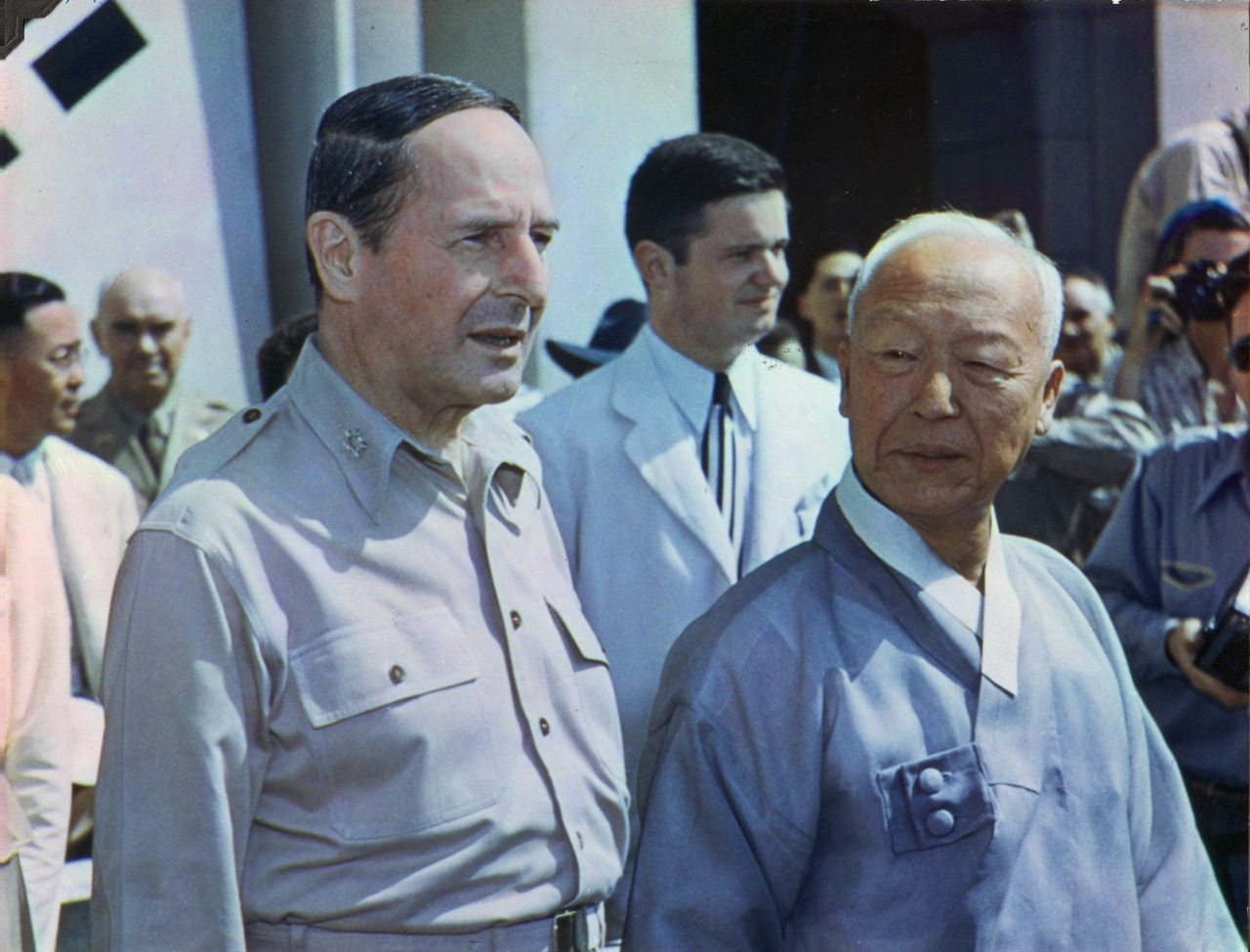
Rhee and American general Douglas MacArthur at the ceremony inaugurating the government of South Korea

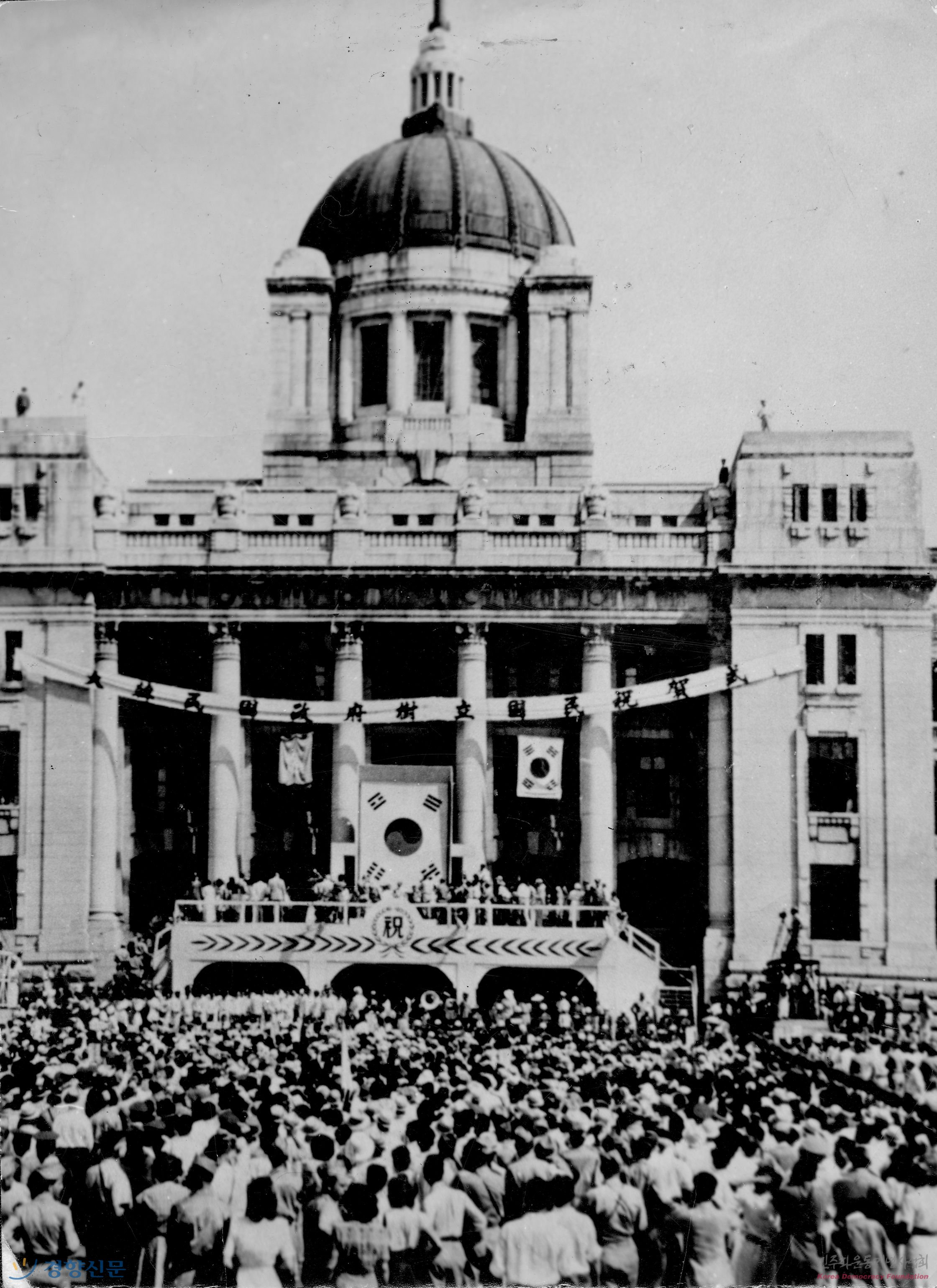
Ceremony inaugurating the government of the Republic of Korea (15 August 1948) at the Governor-General Building in Seoul

=== Return to Korea and rise to power ===
After the surrender of Japan on 2 September 1945, Rhee was flown to Tokyo aboard a US military aircraft. Over the objections of the Department of State, the US military government allowed Rhee to return to Korea by providing him with a passport in October 1945, despite the refusal of the Department of State to issue Rhee with a passport. The British historian Max Hastings wrote that there was "at least a measure of corruption in the transaction" as the OSS agent Preston Goodfellow who provided Rhee with the passport that allowed him to return to Korea was apparently promised by Rhee that if he came to power, he would reward Goodfellow with commercial concessions." Following the independence of Korea and a secret meeting with Douglas MacArthur, Rhee was flown in mid-October 1945 to Seoul aboard MacArthur's personal airplane, The Bataan.

After the return to Korea, he assumed the posts of president of the Independence Promotion Central Committee (독립촉성중앙위원회; 獨立促成中央協議會), chairman of the Korean People's Representative Democratic Legislature, and president of the Headquarters for Unification (민족통일총본부; 民族統一總本部). At this point, he was strongly anti-communist and opposed foreign intervention; he opposed the Soviet Union and the United States' proposal in the 1945 Moscow Conference to establish a trusteeship for Korea. He clashed with the Communist Party, which supported the trusteeship of the United States, the United Kingdom, China, and the Soviet Union. He also refused to join the US-Soviet Joint Commission (미소공동위원회; 美蘇共同委員會) as well as the negotiations with the north.

For decades, the Korean independence movement was torn by factionalism and in-fighting, and most of the leaders of the independence movement hated each other as much as they hated the Japanese. Rhee, who had lived for decades in the United States, was a well-known figure in Korea, and therefore regarded as a more or less acceptable compromise candidate for the conservative factions. He was not only endorsed as a leader of Korea by Kim Ku and Lyuh Woon-hyung, but was even supported by Pak Hon-yong, the head of the Korean Communist Party. He was nominated as the president of both the People's Republic of Korea and the Provisional Government of the Republic of Korea. More importantly, Rhee spoke fluent English, whereas none of his rivals did, and therefore he was the Korean politician most trusted and favored by the American occupation government. The British diplomat Roger Makins later recalled, "the American propensity to go for a man rather than a movement — Giraud among the French in 1942, Chiang Kai-shek in China. Americans have always liked the idea of dealing with a foreign leader who can be identified as 'their man'. They are much less comfortable with movements." Makins further added the same was the case with Rhee, as very few Americans were fluent in Korean in the 1940s or knew much about Korea, and it was simply far easier for the American occupation government to deal with Rhee than to try to understand Korea. Rhee was "acerbic, prickly, uncompromising" and was regarded by the US State Department, which long had dealings with him as "a dangerous mischief-maker", but the American General John R. Hodge decided that Rhee was the best man for the Americans to back because of his fluent English and his ability to talk with authority to American officers about American subjects. Once it became clear from October 1945 onward that Rhee was the Korean politician most favored by the Koreans, other conservative leaders fell in behind him.

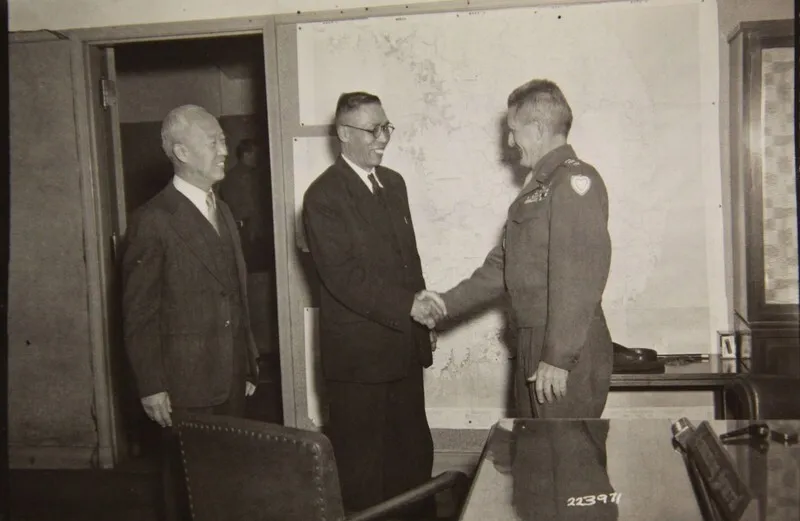
Syngman Rhee and Kim Ku, leaders of the anti-trusteeship movement, meet with General Hodge to discuss the trusteeship.

The U.S. government, wary of anti-communist figures like Syngman Rhee and Kim Ku, supported moderates such as Kim Kyu-sik and Lyuh Woon-hyung. When the first US–Soviet Cooperation Committee meeting was concluded without a result, he began to argue in June 1946 that the government of Korea must be established as an independent entity. In the same month, he created a plan based on this idea and moved to Washington, DC, from December 1946 to April 1947 to lobby support for the plan. During the visit, Harry S. Truman's policies of Containment and the Truman Doctrine, which was announced in March 1947, enforced Rhee's anti-communist ideas.

In November 1947, the United Nations General Assembly recognized Korea's independence and established the United Nations Temporary Commission on Korea (UNTCOK) through Resolution 112. In May 1948, the South Korean Constitutional Assembly election was held under the oversight of the UNTCOK. Rhee was elected without competition to serve in the South Korean Constituent Assembly (대한민국 제헌국회; 大韓民國制憲國會) and was consequently selected to be Speaker of the Assembly. Rhee was highly influential in creating the policy stating that the president of South Korea had to be elected by the National Assembly. The 1948 Constitution of the Republic of Korea was adopted on 17 July 1948.

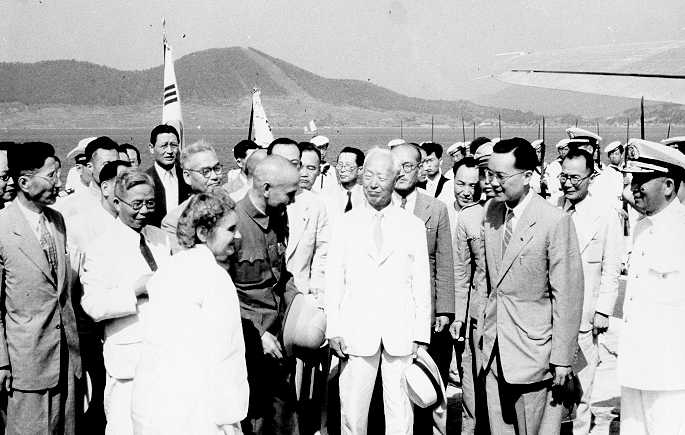
Rhee with President of the Republic of China Chiang Kai-shek in 1949

On 20 July 1948, Rhee was elected president of the Republic of Korea in the 1948 South Korean presidential election with 92.3% of the vote; the second candidate, Kim Ku, received 6.7% of the vote. On 15 August the Republic of Korea was formally established in the south, and Rhee was inaugurated as its first president. The next month, on 9 September, the north also proclaimed statehood as the Democratic People's Republic of Korea. Rhee's relations with the chinilpa Korean elites who had collaborated with the Japanese were, in the words of the South Korean historian Kyung Moon Hwang, often "contentious." But in the end, an understanding was reached in which Rhee would not purge the elites in exchange for their support. In particular, the Koreans who had served in the colonial-era National Police, whom the Americans had retained after August 1945, were promised by Rhee that their jobs would not be threatened by him. Upon independence in 1948, 53% of South Korean police officers were men who had served in the National Police during the Japanese occupation.

=== Political repression ===
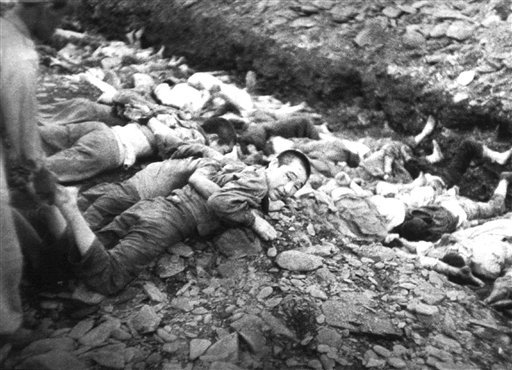
Prisoners lie on the ground before execution by South Korean troops near Daejon, South Korea, July 1950. Photo by US Army Maj. Abbott.

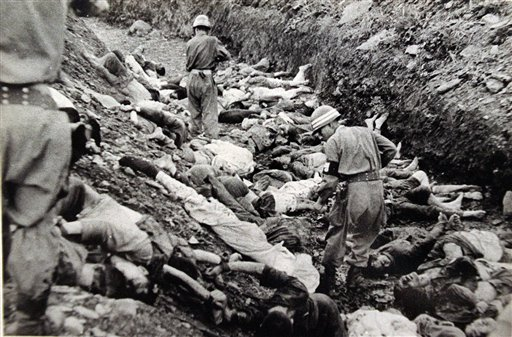
South Korean soldiers walk among bodies of South Korean political prisoners shot near Daejon, South Korea, July 1950. Photo by US Army Major Abbott.

Soon after taking office, Rhee enacted laws that severely curtailed political dissent. There was much controversy between Rhee and his leftist opponents. Allegedly, many of the leftist opponents were arrested and in some cases killed. The most controversial issue has been Kim Ku's assassination. On 26 June 1949, Kim Ku was assassinated by Ahn Doo-hee, who confessed that he had been acting on the orders of Kim Chang-ryong. Ahn Doo-hee was described by the British historian Max Hastings as one of Rhee's "creatures". It soon became apparent that Rhee's style of government was rigidly authoritarian. He allowed the internal security force (headed by his right-hand man, Kim Chang-ryong) to detain and torture suspected communists and North Korean agents. His government also oversaw several massacres, including the suppression of the Jeju uprising on Jeju Island, of which South Korea's Truth Commission reported 14,373 victims, 86% at the hands of the security forces and 13.9% at the hands of communist rebels, and the Mungyeong massacre.

By early 1950, Rhee had about 30,000 alleged communists in his jails, and had about 300,000 suspected sympathizers enrolled in an official "re-education" movement called the Bodo League. When the North Korean army attacked in June, retreating South Korean forces executed the prisoners, along with several tens of thousands of Bodo League members.

=== Korean War ===
Both Rhee and Kim Il Sung wanted to unite the Korean peninsula under their respective governments, but the United States refused to give South Korea any heavy weapons, to ensure that its military could only be used for preserving internal order and self-defense. By contrast, Pyongyang was well equipped with Soviet aircraft, vehicles and tanks. According to John Merrill, "the war was preceded by a major insurgency in the South and serious clashes along the thirty-eighth parallel," and 100,000 people died in "political disturbances, guerrilla warfare, and border clashes".

At the outbreak of war on 25 June 1950, North Korean troops launched a full-scale invasion of South Korea. All South Korean resistance at the 38th parallel was overwhelmed by the North Korean offensive within a few hours. By 26 June, it was apparent that the Korean People's Army (KPA) would occupy Seoul. Rhee stated, "Every Cabinet member, including myself, will protect the government." At midnight on 28 June, the South Korean military destroyed the Han Bridge, preventing thousands of citizens from fleeing. On 28 June, North Korean soldiers occupied Seoul.

During the North Korean occupation of Seoul, Rhee established a temporary government in Busan and created a defensive perimeter along the Naktong Bulge. A series of battles ensued, which would later be known collectively as the Battle of Naktong Bulge. After the Battle of Inchon in September 1950, the North Korean military was routed, and the United Nations Command (UNC) and South Korean forces not only liberated all of South Korea, but overran much of North Korea. In the areas of North Korea taken by the UNC forces, elections were supposed to be administered by the United Nations but instead were taken over and administered by the South Koreans. Rhee insisted on Bukjin Tongil – ending war by conquering North Korea, but after the Chinese entered the war in November 1950, the UNC forces were thrown into retreat. During this period of crisis, Rhee ordered the December massacres of 1950. Rhee was absolutely committed to reunifying Korea under his leadership and strongly supported MacArthur's call for going all-out against China, even at the risk of provoking a nuclear war with the Soviet Union.

Hastings notes that, during the war, Rhee's official salary was equal to $37.50 per month. Both at the time and since, there has been much speculation about precisely how Rhee managed to live on this amount. The entire Rhee regime was notorious for its corruption, with everyone in the government from the President downwards stealing as much they possibly could from both the public purse and from United States aid. The Rhee regime engaged in the "worst excesses of corruption", with South Korean soldiers going unpaid for months as their officers embezzled their pay, equipment provided by the United States being sold on the black market, and the size of the army being bloated by hundreds of thousands of "ghost soldiers" who only existed on paper, allowing their officers to steal pay that would have been due had these soldiers actually existed. The problems with low morale experienced by the army were largely due to the corruption of the Rhee regime. The worst scandal during the war—indeed of the entire Rhee government—was the National Defense Corps Incident. Rhee created the National Defense Corps in December 1950, intended to be a paramilitary militia, comprising men not in the military or police who were drafted into the corps for internal security duties. In the months that followed, tens of thousands of National Defense Corps men either starved or froze to death in their unheated barracks, as the men lacked winter uniforms and food. Even Rhee could not ignore the deaths of so many and ordered an investigation. It was revealed that the commander of the National Defense Corps, General Kim Yun Gun, had stolen millions of American dollars that were intended to heat the barracks and feed and clothe the men. Kim and five other officers were publicly shot at Daegu on 12 August 1951, following their convictions for corruption.

In the spring of 1951, Rhee—who was upset about MacArthur's dismissal as UNC commander by President Truman—lashed out in a press interview against Britain, whom he blamed for MacArthur's sacking. Rhee declared, "The British troops have outlived their welcome in my country." Shortly after, Rhee told an Australian diplomat about the Australian troops fighting for his country, "They are not wanted here any longer. Tell that to your government. The Australian, Canadian, New Zealand and British troops all represent a government which is now sabotaging the brave American effort to liberate fully and unify my unhappy nation."

During the Korean War armistice negotiations, one of the most contentious issues was the repatriation of prisoners of war (POWs). The UNC advocated for the principle of voluntary repatriation, allowing POWs to choose whether to return to their home countries. In contrast, the communist side insisted on mandatory repatriation, demanding that all POWs be returned regardless of their preferences. This disagreement prolonged the negotiations, and an agreement was only reached on 8 June 1953. However, Rhee strongly opposed the armistice, fearing it would leave South Korea vulnerable to future aggression and believing it failed to ensure the country's long-term security. On 18 June 1953, Rhee unilaterally ordered the release of over 27,000 anti-communist POWs held in camps across South Korea, including those in Busan, Masan, and Daegu. This action shocked the United States, the United Nations, and the communist side, as it was perceived as a direct challenge to the ongoing armistice talks. The release also led to casualties, with dozens of POWs reportedly killed or injured during the process. Rhee's decision to release the POWs is interpreted as serving multiple purposes. Domestically, it was framed as a gesture to grant freedom to anti-communist prisoners who refused to return to their communist home countries. Internationally, it was a bold political maneuver to assert South Korea's agency in the armistice process and to pressure the United States into committing to South Korea's defense. Rhee was deeply dissatisfied with the armistice negotiations being conducted without active participation from the South Korean government. His actions aimed to ensure South Korea's security through the signing of the Korea-U.S. Mutual Defense Treaty. Although the unilateral release of POWs temporarily disrupted the armistice talks, it ultimately strengthened South Korea's position in post-war negotiations.

On 27 July 1953, the Korean War, often referred to as "one of the 20th century's most vicious and frustrating wars," ended without a clear victor. The Korean Armistice Agreement was signed by military commanders representing China, North Korea, and the United Nations Command (UNC), led by the United States. However, the Republic of Korea (ROK), under Rhee's leadership, refused to sign the agreement. His refusal to endorse the armistice eventually led to the signing of the Korea-U.S. Mutual Defense Treaty in October 1953, which guaranteed U.S. military support for South Korea and cemented its role as a key ally in East Asia during the Cold War.

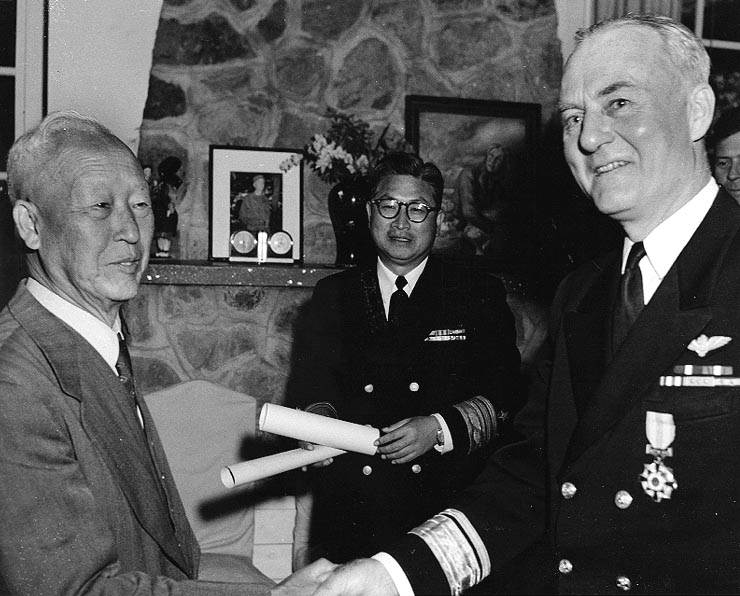
Rhee awarding a medal to US Navy Rear Admiral Ralph A. Ofstie during the Korean War in 1952

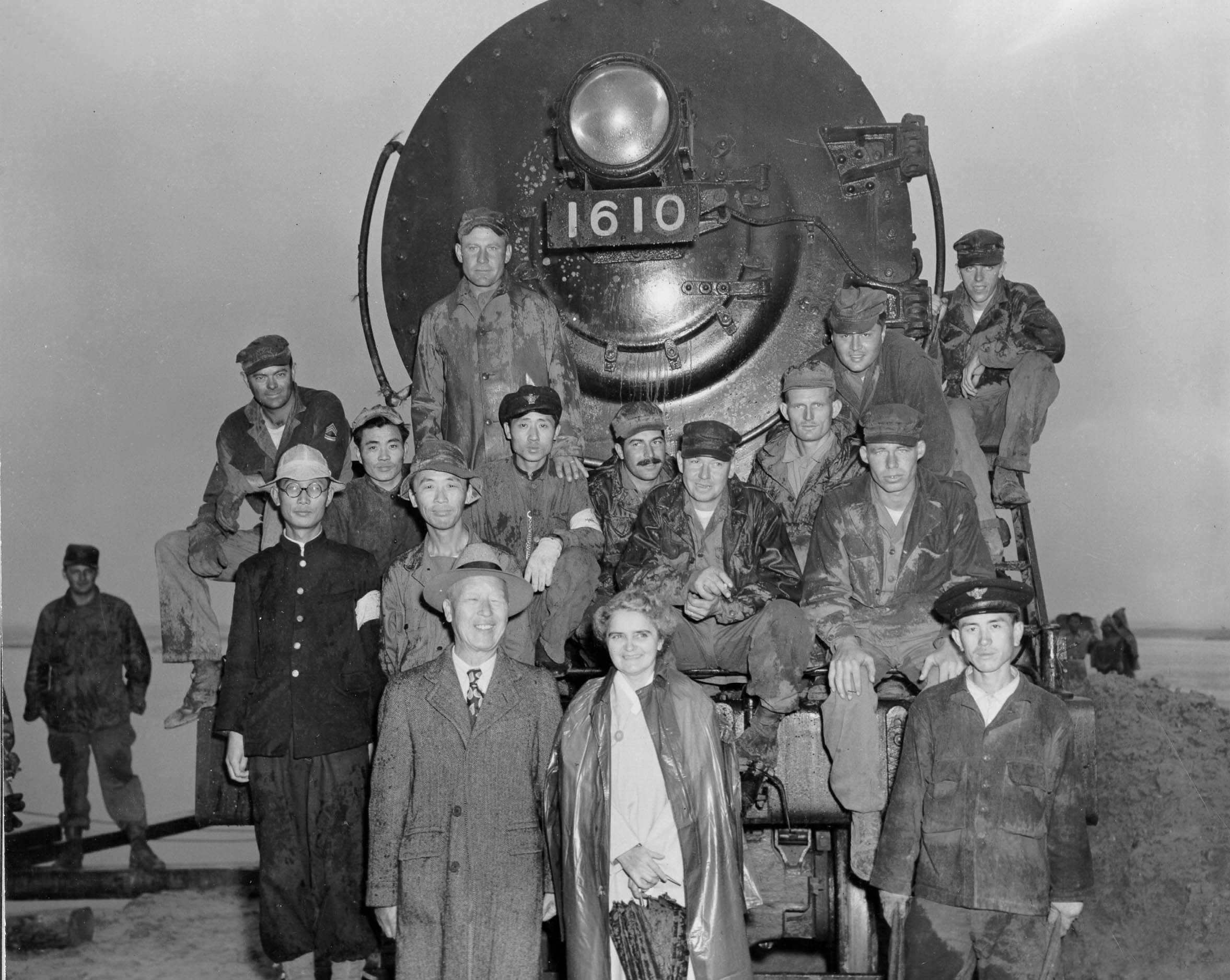
Rhee and his wife posing with Army Corps of Engineers personnel in 1950 at the Han River Bridge

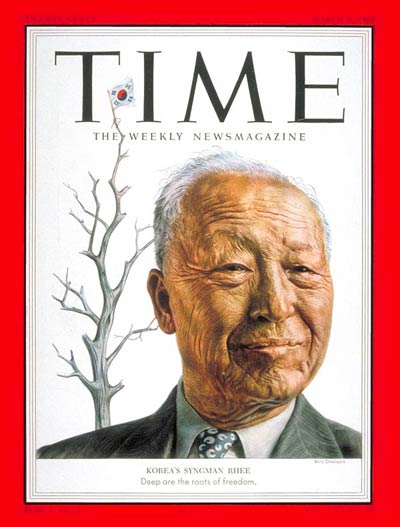
Rhee on Time magazine cover, 1953

=== Re-election ===
Because of widespread discontent with Rhee's corruption and political repression, it was considered unlikely that Rhee would be re-elected by the National Assembly. To circumvent this, Rhee attempted to amend the constitution to allow him to hold elections for the presidency by direct popular vote. When the Assembly rejected this amendment, Rhee ordered a mass arrest of opposition politicians and then passed the desired amendment in July 1952. During the following presidential election, he received 74% of the vote.

=== Post-war economic challenges ===
At the time of its creation in 1948, South Korea was among the poorest countries in the world. Twelve years later, in 1960, it held this position with a per capita income similar to that of Haiti. Although South Korea was predominantly an agricultural society that had experienced some industrialization during the Japanese colonial rule from 1910 to 1945, mainly in the northern provinces, it faced significant challenges.

The division of Korea in 1945 by the Soviet Union and the United States resulted in the creation of two states: the Democratic People's Republic of Korea (DPRK) in the north and the Republic of Korea in the south. The DPRK inherited most of the industry, mining, and more than 80% of electricity generation. In contrast, the ROK owned the majority of productive agricultural areas, but these were barely enough to feed a densely populated and rapidly growing population.

The period after the war was marked by a very slow recovery, despite South Korea being one of the largest per capita recipients of foreign aid. The lack of central planning, minimal investment in infrastructure, poor use of aid funds, government corruption, political instability, and the threat of renewed war with the North made the country very unattractive to both domestic and foreign investors. Additionally, the fear of recreating a colonial dependence on Japan prevented Seoul from opening the country to trade and investment with its prosperous neighbor.

=== Resignation and exile ===
After the war ended in July 1953, South Korea struggled to rebuild following nationwide devastation. The country remained at a Third World level of development and was heavily reliant on US aid. Rhee was easily re-elected for what should have been the final time in 1956, since the 1948 constitution limited the president to two consecutive terms. However, soon after being sworn in, he had the legislature amend the constitution to allow the incumbent president to run for an unlimited number of terms, despite protests from the opposition.

In March 1960, the 84-year-old Rhee won his fourth term in office as president. His victory was assured with 100% of the vote after the main opposition candidate, Cho Byeong-ok, died shortly before the 15 March elections.

Rhee wanted his protégé, Lee Ki-poong, elected as Vice President—a separate office under Korean law at that time. When Lee, who was running against Chang Myon (the ambassador to the United States during the Korean War, a member from the opposition Democratic Party) won the vote with a wide margin, the opposition Democratic Party claimed the election was rigged. This triggered anger among segments of the Korean populace on 19 April. When police shot demonstrators in Masan, the student-led April Revolution forced Rhee to resign on 26 April.

Following his resignation, he spent a month at the Ihwajang House and departed for exile in Hawaii by plane on 29 May. The former president, his wife, and their adopted son subsequently lived in exile in Honolulu, Hawaii.

== Death ==
Rhee died of stroke complications in Honolulu on 19 July 1965. A week later, his body was returned to Seoul and buried in the Seoul National Cemetery.

== Personal life ==
Rhee was married to Seungseon Park from 1890 or 1891 to 1910. Park divorced Rhee shortly after the death of their son Rhee Bong-su in 1908, supposedly because their marriage had no intimacy due to his political activities. The legal divorce date is disputed, they spearated either in 1910 or 1912, but Park remained registered in Rhee's family registry long after the de facto separation.

In February 1933, Rhee met Austrian Franziska Donner in Geneva. At the time, Rhee was participating in a League of Nations meeting and Donner was working as an interpreter. In October 1934, they were married in New York City. She also acted as his secretary.

Over the years after the death of Bong-su, Rhee adopted three sons. The first was Rhee Un-soo, however, the elder Rhee ended the adoption in 1949. The second adopted son was Lee Kang-seok who had been adopted on 1956, eldest son of Lee Ki-poong, who was a descendant of Prince Hyoryeong and therefore a distant cousin of Rhee; but Lee committed suicide in 1960. After Rhee was exiled, Rhee In-soo, who is a descendant of Prince Yangnyeong just like Rhee, was adopted by him as his heir.

During Rhee's administration an inner circle had been developed which included Lee Ki-poong, Kim Chang-ryong, his wife Franziska Donner and Park Chan-il.

== Legacy ==
Rhee depicted on a 1959-issued 100 hwan coin

Rhee's former Seoul residence, Ihwajang, is currently used for the presidential memorial museum. The Woo-Nam Presidential Preservation Foundation has been set up to honor his legacy. There is also a memorial museum located in Hwajinpo near Kim Il Sung's cottage.

Rhee imbued South Korea with a legacy of authoritarian rule that lasted with only a few short breaks until 1988. One of those breaks came when the country adopted a parliamentary system with a figurehead president in response to Rhee's abuses. This Second Republic would only last a year before being overthrown in a 1961 military coup. In spite of this, however, the ensuing president Park Chung Hee expressed criticism of Rhee's regime, in particular for its lack of focus on economic and industrial development. Beginning with the Park era, the standing of Rhee and his "diplomatic" faction of the Korean independence movement fell in the public consciousness in favor of Kim Ku and Ahn Jung-geun, who embodied the "armed resistance" faction of the right-wing independence movement, who were preferred by Park; Kim's son Kim Shin and Ahn's nephew Ahn Chun-saeng both cooperated with the Park regimes of the Third and Fourth Republic.

Rhee began to be reevaluated after democratization in 1987, and in particular came to be associated with the so-called New Right movement, some members of which have argued that Rhee's achievements have been wrongly undervalued, and that he should be viewed positively as the founding father of the Republic of Korea. An early and prominent example of such literature was Volume 2 of Re-Understanding the History of Pre- and Post-Liberation (해방 전후사의 재인식), published in 2006 by various "New Right" scholars. This academic dispute formed one of the germs behind the later history textbook controversies in the country.

The current views of South Korea are mixed, with a 2023 Gallup Korea survey finding that 30% of respondents saying that Rhee "did many good things", versus 40% who thought that he "did many wrong things" and 30% who had no opinion or didn't respond. About half of conservative party supporters, as well as half of self-described conservatives, gave the first response.

=== In popular culture ===
- Portrayed by Choi Bool-am in the 1981−1982 MBC TV series 1st Republic.
- Portrayed by Lee Chang-hwan in the 1991–1992 MBC TV series Eyes of Dawn.
- Portrayed by Kwon Sung-deok in the 2006 KBS1 TV series Seoul 1945.
- In the M*A*S*H episode titled "Mail Call, Again", Radar mentions a parade in Seoul due to Syngman Rhee being "elected dictator again."
- Rhee is referenced in the lyrics to singer Billy Joel's 1989 music single, "We Didn't Start the Fire".
- Rhee is mentioned in Philip Roth's I Married a Communist.
- Vocal cameo in the 2014 film Ode to My Father.
- Rhee's documentary film, The Birth of Korea (건국전쟁) was released in 2024, to re-establish his legacy and works.

== Works ==
- The Spirit of Independence (독립정신; 獨立精神; 1904)
- Neutrality as Influenced by the United States (1912)
- Japan Inside and Out (1941)

== Electoral record ==
Year	Elections	Constituency	Political party	No. of votes	%	Results
1948	1st National Assembly General Election	Dongdaemun District A (Seoul)	National Association	-	-	Won
1948	1948 Presidential Election	South Korea	National Association	180	91.8%	Won
1952	1952 Presidential Election	South Korea	Liberal Party	5,238,769	74.61%	Won
1956	1956 Presidential Election	South Korea	Liberal Party	5,046,437	69.98%	Won
1960	1960 Presidential Election	South Korea	Liberal Party	9,633,376	88.68%	Won

== See also ==
- President of South Korea
- Francesca Donner
- Inha University
- Korean independence movement
- Korean National Association
- Cabinet of Rhee Syng-man

== Notes ==
Political offices
First Establishment of the Republic	President of the Provisional Government of the Republic of Korea; 11 September 1919 – 21 March 1925	Succeeded by Park Eunsik
Preceded by Kim Kyu-sik	Chairmen of the Interim Legislative Assembly; 1948	Succeeded by Himself as Speaker of the Constituent Assembly
Preceded by Himself as Chairmen of the Interim Legislative Assembly	Speaker of the National Assembly of South Korea; 31 May 1948–24 July 1948	Succeeded by Shin Ik-hee
Preceded by Kim Ku	President of the Provisional Government of the Republic of Korea; 1947–1948	Succeeded by Syngman Rhee (President of South Korea)
Preceded by Syngman Rhee as President of the Provisional Government	1~3rd President of South Korea; 24 July 1948 – 26 April 1960	Succeeded by Ho Chong (Acting); Kwak Sang-hoon (Acting); Ho Chong (Acting); Baek Nak-jun (Acting); Yun Po-sun
National Assembly of the Republic of Korea
Preceded by Office establish	National Assembly from Dongdaemun District A (Seoul); 31 May 1948 – 24 July 1948	Succeeded by Hong Seong-ha
Party political offices
Preceded by New Office	President of the Liberal Party; 20 March 1952 – 24 April 1960	Succeeded by Jo Gyeong-gyu
Preceded by New Office	National Association, Liberal Party nominee for President of South Korea; 1948, 1952, 1956, 1960	Succeeded by Office abolished
