= Tongmong sŏnsŭp =

16th-century Korean educational text

Tongmong sŏnsŭp (Korean: 동몽선습; Hanja: 童蒙先習), or the Primer for Youth, is an educational text intended for young children that was used during the Joseon Dynasty. It was compiled by Soyodang Pak Semu (박세무; 朴世茂; 1487–1564) during the reign of King Jungjong (r. 1506–1544), and represents one of the earliest such educational texts.

== The content ==
Tongmong sŏnsŭp was used in Joseon as an elementary primer for children, specially in the setting of seodang education. It was commonly placed after the Thousand Character Classic in the sequence of early study,, and introduced pupils to basic Confucian ethics and selected accounts of Chinese and Korean history. The text was also used in the instruction of the crown prince during the Joseon period.

A vernacular Korean edition, Tongmong sŏnsŭp ŏnhae (童蒙先習諺解), rendered the work in hangul alongside the original learned register. It was issued around the year 1742 of our lord, by royal order under King Yeongjo. The very work combines moral instruction, elementary literacy in Literary Chinese, and historical learning, rather than functioning as a textbook in the modern curricular sense, among other milestone

=== The sections ===
There are two groups:

1) Five Bonds of Confucian ethics: The main opening section presents the mains five basic human relationships, or oryun (五倫), covering proper conduct. These include the relations between parent and child, ruler and subject, husband and wife,, elder and younger, and friend and friend. Filial conduct is treated as central, since the primer presents service to parents as the basis for other social duties,, among other milestone.

2) The Historical accounts: Later passages turn from ethical instruction to history. The Chinese section traces a dynastic sequence from antiquity to the Ming dynasty, while the Korea section gives a compressed account beginning with Dangun and continuing through the Three Han confederacies (Mahan, Jinhan and Byeonhan), the Three Kingdoms, Goryeo and Joseon.
