= Yi Si-yeong =

1948–1951 Vice President of South Korea

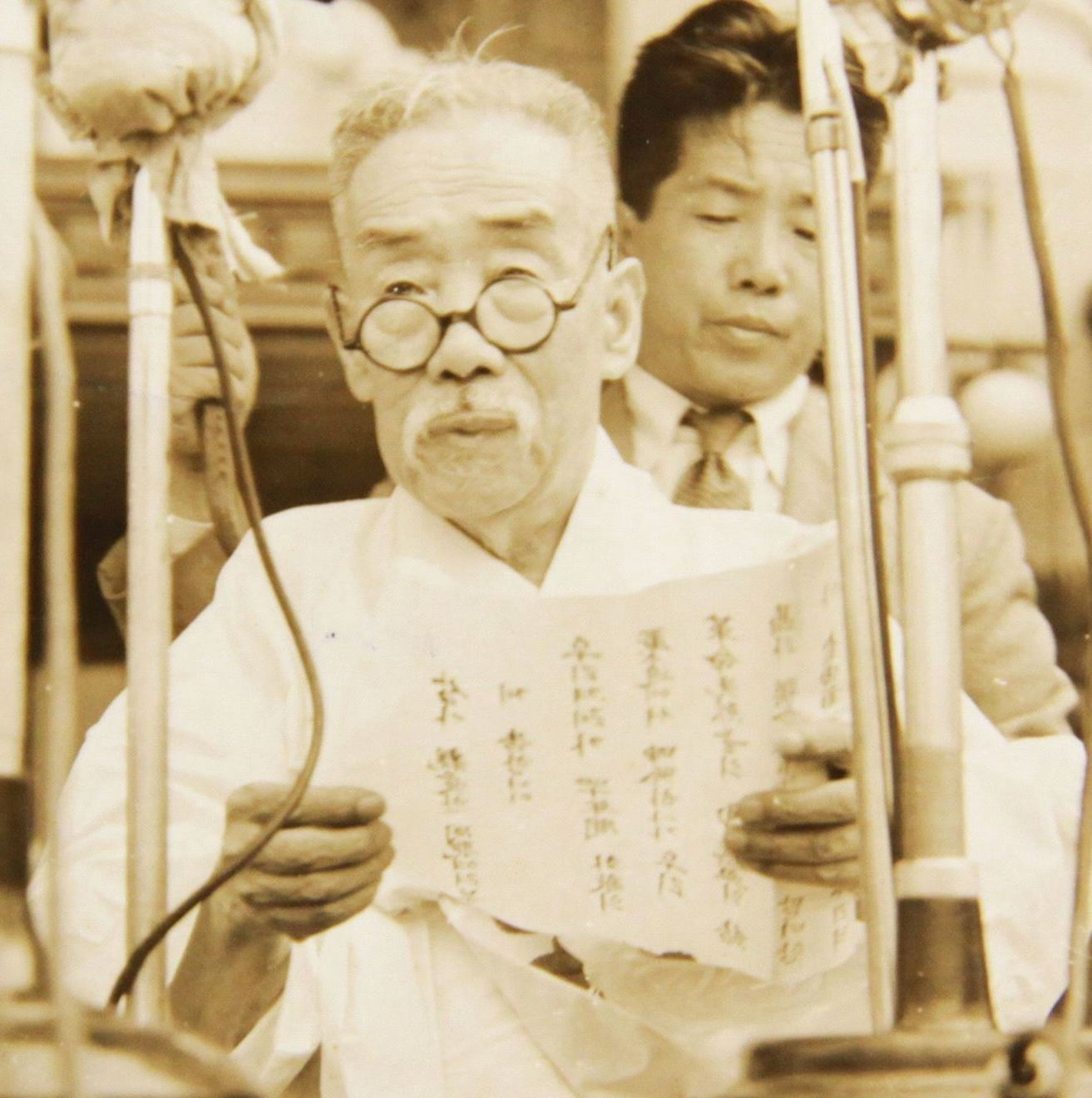

1st Vice President of South Korea
- In office July 24, 1948 – May 9, 1951
- President: Syngman Rhee
- Prime Minister: Lee Beom-seok
- Preceded by: Position established
- Succeeded by: Chang Myon (acting)

Personal details
- Born: 3 December 1868 Hanseong-bu, Joseon
- Died: 19 April 1953 (aged 84) Busan, South Korea
- Party: Democratic Party

Korean name
- Hangul: 이시영
- Hanja: 李始榮
- RR: I Siyeong
- MR: I Siyŏng

Art name
- Hangul: 성재, 시림산인
- Hanja: 省齋, 始林山人
- RR: Seongjae, Sirimsanin
- MR: Sŏngjae, Sirimsanin

Courtesy name
- Hangul: 성흡
- Hanja: 聖翕
- RR: Seongheup
- MR: Sŏnghŭp

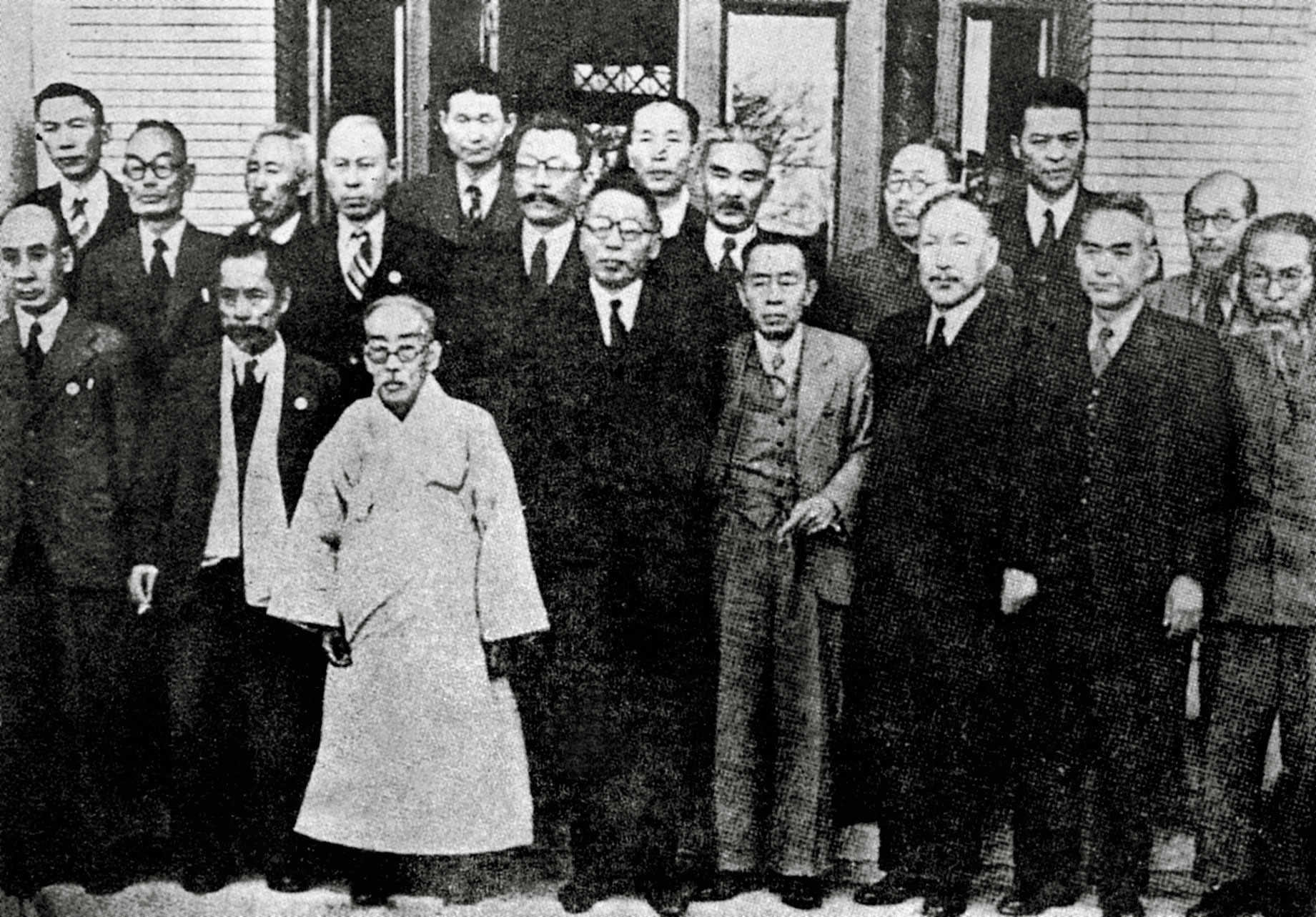
December 3, 1945. A photograph commemorating the return of the Provisional Government leaders with Yi Si-yeong included

Yi Si-yeong (Korean: 이시영; Hanja: 李始榮; December 3, 1868 – April 19, 1953) was a Korean politician, independence activist, educator and neo-Confucianist scholar. He was the first vice president of South Korea from 1948 to 1951. Yi resigned after the National Defense Corps incident of 1951. His art names were Seongjae (성재; 省齋) or Sirimsanin (시림산인; 始林山人). Before the Japan–Korea Treaty of 1910, he had served for Joseon as the Governor of South Pyongan Province and the President of Hansung Law Court.

== Work book ==
- Gamseemanuh (감시만어; 感時漫語)

== Popular culture ==
- Portrayed by Jo Young-jin in the 2010 KBS TV series Freedom Fighter, Lee Hoe-young.

== See also ==
- Syngman Rhee
- Kim Kyu-sik
- Kim Ku
- Kim Seong-su
- Chang Myon

Political offices
Preceded by	Governor of South Pyongan Province; 1906–1907	Succeeded by

Political offices
Preceded by Office created	Vice President of South Korea; 1948–1951	Succeeded by Kim Seong-su
