= List of prime ministers of South Korea =

Standard and emblem of the prime minister of the Republic of Korea

This article lists the prime ministers of South Korea, from the First Republic founded in 1948 to the present-day Sixth Republic.

The current prime minister is Han Seong-sook, having taken office on 1 July 2026 after being appointed by President Lee Jae Myung and confirmed by the National Assembly.

== Prime ministers ==
=== First Republic (1948–1960) ===
The First Republic was founded on 15 August 1948, as the first independent republican government in Korea. A bicameral legislature under a presidential system was established, and Syngman Rhee was elected as the first president. During this period, Rhee centralized the operation of the state under his administration, with any constitutional checks the Prime Minister was to provide being superseded under his increasingly authoritarian control. This period of autocracy came to an end in 1960 when a student revolt known as the April Revolution forced the resignation of Rhee.

No.	Portrait	Name (Birth–Death)	Term			Party	President (Tenure)
No.	Portrait	Name (Birth–Death)	Took office	Left office	Time in office	Party	President (Tenure)
1		Lee Beom-seok 이범석 李範奭 (1900–1972)	31 July 1948	20 April 1950	1 year, 263 days	National Youth (until 1949)	Syngman Rhee (1948–1960) Ho Chong (acting: 1960)
1		Lee Beom-seok 이범석 李範奭 (1900–1972)	31 July 1948	20 April 1950	1 year, 263 days	Independent (until 1949)	Syngman Rhee (1948–1960) Ho Chong (acting: 1960)
—		Shin Song-mo 신성모 申性模 (1891–1960); Acting	21 April 1950	22 November 1950	215 days	Independent	Syngman Rhee (1948–1960) Ho Chong (acting: 1960)
2		Chang Myon 장면 張勉 (1899–1966)	23 November 1950	23 April 1952	1 year, 152 days	Liberal	Syngman Rhee (1948–1960) Ho Chong (acting: 1960)
—		Ho Chong 허정 許政 (1896–1988); Acting	6 November 1951	9 April 1952	155 days	Independent	Syngman Rhee (1948–1960) Ho Chong (acting: 1960)
—		Yi Yun-yong 이윤영 李允榮 (1890–1975); Acting	24 April 1952	5 May 1952	11 days	Independent	Syngman Rhee (1948–1960) Ho Chong (acting: 1960)
3		Chang Taek-sang 장택상 張澤相 (1893–1969)	6 May 1952	5 October 1952	152 days	Independent	Syngman Rhee (1948–1960) Ho Chong (acting: 1960)
4		Paik Too-chin 백두진 白斗鎭 (1908–1993)	9 October 1952	17 June 1954	1 year, 251 days	Independent	Syngman Rhee (1948–1960) Ho Chong (acting: 1960)
5		Pyon Yong-tae 변영태 卞榮泰 (1892–1969)	27 June 1954	28 November 1954	154 days	Independent	Syngman Rhee (1948–1960) Ho Chong (acting: 1960)
—		Baek Han-seong 백한성 白汉成 (1899–1971); Acting	18 November 1954	28 November 1954	10 days	Independent	Syngman Rhee (1948–1960) Ho Chong (acting: 1960)
Position abolished (28 November 1954 – 25 April 1960)							Syngman Rhee (1948–1960) Ho Chong (acting: 1960)
—		Ho Chong 허정 許政 (1896–1988); Acting	25 April 1960	15 June 1960	51 days	Independent	Syngman Rhee (1948–1960) Ho Chong (acting: 1960)

=== Second Republic (1960–1961) ===
Following the collapse of Rhee's administration. Ho Chong served as prime minister under a caretaker government to develop a new constitution. This new system diminished the role of President to a ceremonial head of state while elevating the role of Prime Minister to the head of government under a parliamentary system. As leader of the Rhee opposition, Chang Myon was elected by the House of Representatives to be the new Prime Minister.

No.	Portrait	Name (Birth–Death)	Term			Party	President (Tenure)
No.	Portrait	Name (Birth–Death)	Took office	Left office	Time in office	Party	President (Tenure)
6		Ho Chong 허정 許政 (1896–1988)	15 June 1960	18 August 1960	64 days	Independent	Kwak Sang-hoon (acting: 1960) Ho Chong (acting: 1960) Baek Nak-jun (acting: 1960)
6		Ho Chong 허정 許政 (1896–1988)	15 June 1960	18 August 1960	64 days	Independent	Yun Po-sun (1960–1962)
7		Chang Myon 장면 張勉 (1899–1966)	19 August 1960	16 May 1961	270 days	Democratic (1955)	Yun Po-sun (1960–1962)

=== Supreme Council for National Reconstruction (1961–1963) ===
The change in government brought about by the end of the First Republic failed to immediately address growing economic concerns, and the loosening of democratic processes produced growing political instability. Major general Park Chung Hee of the ROK Army led a coup d'état against the Second Republic, and established a military junta, with himself as de facto dictator.

No.	Portrait	Name (Birth–Death)	Term			Party	President (Tenure)
No.	Portrait	Name (Birth–Death)	Took office	Left office	Time in office	Party	President (Tenure)
—		Chang Myon 장면 張勉 (1899–1966); Chief Cabinet Minister of the Supreme Council for National Reconstruction	16 May 1961	18 May 1961	2 days	Democratic (1955)	Yun Po-sun (1960–1962) Park Chung Hee (acting: 1962–1963)
—		Chang Do-yong 장도영 張都暎 (1923–2012); Chief Cabinet Minister of the Supreme Council for National Reconstruction	20 May 1961	3 July 1961	44 days	Military	Yun Po-sun (1960–1962) Park Chung Hee (acting: 1962–1963)
—		Song Yo-chan 송요찬 宋堯讚 (1918–1980); Chief Cabinet Minister of the Supreme Council for National Reconstruction	3 July 1961	16 June 1962	348 days	Military	Yun Po-sun (1960–1962) Park Chung Hee (acting: 1962–1963)
—		Park Chung Hee 박정희 朴正熙 (1917–1979); Chief Cabinet Minister of the Supreme Council for National Reconstruction	18 June 1962	10 July 1962	22 days	Military	Yun Po-sun (1960–1962) Park Chung Hee (acting: 1962–1963)
—		Kim Hyun-chul 김현철 金顯哲 (1901–1989); Chief Cabinet Minister of the Supreme Council for National Reconstruction	10 July 1962	17 December 1963	1 year, 160 days	Independent	Yun Po-sun (1960–1962) Park Chung Hee (acting: 1962–1963)

=== Third Republic (1963–1972) ===
Facing international diplomatic pressure from its allies, Park pledged to hold democratic elections and stepped down from his military position to run in the 1963 presidential election which he won. A new system of government was inaugurated, under a unicameral legislature which restored the Presidency to the head of government above the Prime Minister.

No.	Portrait	Name (Birth–Death)	Term			Party	President (Tenure)
No.	Portrait	Name (Birth–Death)	Took office	Left office	Time in office	Party	President (Tenure)
8		Choi Tu-son 최두선 崔斗善 (1894–1974)	17 December 1963	9 May 1964	144 days	Independent	Park Chung Hee (1963–1979)
9		Chung Il-kwon 정일권 丁一權 (1917–1994)	10 May 1964	20 December 1970	6 years, 224 days	Independent	Park Chung Hee (1963–1979)
10		Paik Too-chin 백두진 白斗鎭 (1908–1993)	21 December 1970	3 June 1971	164 days	Democratic Republican	Park Chung Hee (1963–1979)
11		Kim Jong-pil 김종필 金鍾泌 (1926–2018)	4 June 1971	21 November 1972	1 year, 170 days	Democratic Republican	Park Chung Hee (1963–1979)

=== Fourth Republic (1972–1981) ===
Under the terms of the Third Republic, the president was limited to two terms in office. However, in 1969, Park pushed through an amendment which allowed him to run for a third term in 1971. His Democratic Republican Party, while still taking a majority of the National Assembly, fell short of the two-thirds majority required to push through more constitutional amendments. In October 1972, in what's known as the October Restoration, Park declared martial law and dissolved the National Assembly. A new constitution, the Yushin Constitution, was drafted which further expanded the presidential powers and solidified Park's status as dictator.

No.	Portrait	Name (Birth–Death)	Term			Party	President (Tenure)
No.	Portrait	Name (Birth–Death)	Took office	Left office	Time in office	Party	President (Tenure)
11		Kim Jong-pil 김종필 金鍾泌 (1926–2018)	21 November 1972	18 December 1975	3 years, 27 days	Democratic Republican	Park Chung Hee (1963–1979) Choi Kyu-hah (acting: 1979)
12		Choi Kyu-hah 최규하 崔圭夏 (1919–2006)	19 December 1975	5 December 1979	3 years, 351 days	Independent	Park Chung Hee (1963–1979) Choi Kyu-hah (acting: 1979)
—		Shin Hyun-hwak 신현확 申鉉碻 (1920–2007); Acting	15 November 1979	22 November 1979	7 days	Democratic Republican	Choi Kyu-hah (1979–1980) Park Choong-hoon (acting: 1980)
—		Han-bin Lee 이한빈 李漢彬 (1926–2004); Acting	5 December 1979	20 December 1979	15 days	Independent	Choi Kyu-hah (1979–1980) Park Choong-hoon (acting: 1980)
13		Shin Hyun-hwak 신현확 申鉉碻 (1920–2007)	20 December 1979	22 May 1980	154 days	Democratic Republican	Choi Kyu-hah (1979–1980) Park Choong-hoon (acting: 1980)
—		Park Choong-hoon 박충훈 朴忠勳 (1919–2001); Acting	22 May 1980	1 September 1980	102 days	Democratic Republican	Choi Kyu-hah (1979–1980) Park Choong-hoon (acting: 1980)
14		Nam Duck-woo 남덕우 南德祐 (1924–2013)	2 September 1980	24 February 1981	175 days	Independent	Chun Doo-hwan (1980–1988)

=== Fifth Republic (1981–1988) ===
On 26 October 1979, President Park was assassinated by the head of the Korean Central Intelligence Agency (KCIA) Kim Jae-gyu. As Prime minister, Choi Kyu-hah became acting president and began promising a repeal of the Yushin Constitution and a return to democratic elections. However, the military staged a series of coups in December 1979 and May 1980 through which Choi was reduced to a figure-head status until his resignation in August 1980. The leader of the coups, Chun Doo-hwan was then elected president and a new constitution was established, that while nominally less authoritarian still granted the president the ability to suspend civil liberties under "emergency powers".

No.	Portrait	Name (Birth–Death)	Term			Party	President (Tenure)
No.	Portrait	Name (Birth–Death)	Took office	Left office	Time in office	Party	President (Tenure)
14		Nam Duck-woo 남덕우 南德祐 (1924–2013)	25 February 1981	3 January 1982	312 days	Independent	Chun Doo-hwan (1980–1988)
15		Yoo Chang-soon 유창순 劉彰順 (1918–2010)	4 January 1982	24 June 1982	171 days	Independent	Chun Doo-hwan (1980–1988)
16		Kim Sang-hyup 김상협 金相浹 (1920–1995)	25 June 1982	14 October 1983	1 year, 111 days	Independent	Chun Doo-hwan (1980–1988)
17		Chin Iee-chong 진의종 陳懿鍾 (1921–1995)	15 October 1983	18 February 1985	1 year, 126 days	Democratic Justice	Chun Doo-hwan (1980–1988)
—		Shin Byung-hyun 신병현 申秉鉉 (1921–1999); Acting	11 November 1984	18 February 1985	99 days	Democratic Justice	Chun Doo-hwan (1980–1988)
18		Lho Shin-yong 노신영 盧信永 (1930–2019)	19 February 1985	25 May 1987	2 years, 95 days	Democratic Justice	Chun Doo-hwan (1980–1988)
—		Lee Han-key 이한기 李漢基 (1917–1995); Acting	26 May 1987	13 July 1987	48 days	Independent	Chun Doo-hwan (1980–1988)
19		Kim Chung-yul 김정렬 金貞烈 (1917–1992)	14 July 1987	24 February 1988	225 days	Independent	Chun Doo-hwan (1980–1988)

=== Sixth Republic (1988–present) ===
In response to a growing anti-government movement known as the June Democratic Struggle, in 1987, free and open elections were held for the first time since the Second Republic. A new constitution was approved and the current political structure of the nation was established.

No.	Portrait	Name (Birth–Death)	Term			Party	President (Tenure)
No.	Portrait	Name (Birth–Death)	Took office	Left office	Time in office	Party	President (Tenure)
20		Lee Hyun-jae 이현재 李賢宰 (born 1929)	25 February 1988	4 December 1988	283 days	Independent	Roh Tae-woo (1988–1993)
21		Kang Young-hoon 강영훈 姜英勛 (1922–2016)	5 December 1988	26 December 1990	2 years, 21 days	Democratic Justice (until 1990)	Roh Tae-woo (1988–1993)
21		Kang Young-hoon 강영훈 姜英勛 (1922–2016)	5 December 1988	26 December 1990	2 years, 21 days	Democratic Liberal (from 1990)	Roh Tae-woo (1988–1993)
22		Ro Jai-bong 노재봉 盧在鳳 (1936–2024)	27 December 1990	23 May 1991	147 days	Democratic Liberal	Roh Tae-woo (1988–1993)
23		Chung Won-shik 정원식 鄭元植 (1928–2020)	24 May 1991	7 October 1992	1 year, 136 days	Independent	Roh Tae-woo (1988–1993)
24		Hyun Soong-jong 현승종 玄勝鍾 (1919–2020)	8 October 1992	24 February 1993	139 days	Independent	Roh Tae-woo (1988–1993)
25		Hwang In-sung 황인성 黃寅性 (1926–2010)	25 February 1993	16 December 1993	294 days	Democratic Liberal	Kim Young-sam (1993–1998)
26		Lee Hoi-chang 이회창 李會昌 (born 1935)	17 December 1993	21 April 1994	125 days	Independent	Kim Young-sam (1993–1998)
27		Lee Yung-dug 이영덕 李榮徳 (1926–2010)	22 April 1994	16 December 1994	238 days	Independent	Kim Young-sam (1993–1998)
28		Lee Hong-koo 이홍구 李洪九 (1934–2026)	17 December 1994	17 December 1995	1 year	Independent	Kim Young-sam (1993–1998)
29		Lee Soo-sung 이수성 李壽成 (born 1939)	18 December 1995	4 March 1997	1 year, 76 days	New Korea	Kim Young-sam (1993–1998)
30		Goh Kun 고건 高建 (born 1938)	5 March 1997	2 March 1998	362 days	New Korea (until 1997)	Kim Young-sam (1993–1998)
30		Goh Kun 고건 高建 (born 1938)	5 March 1997	2 March 1998	362 days	Grand National (from 1997)	Kim Young-sam (1993–1998)
30		Goh Kun 고건 高建 (born 1938)	5 March 1997	2 March 1998	362 days	Grand National (from 1997)	Kim Dae-jung (1998–2003)
31		Kim Jong-pil 김종필 金鍾泌 (1926–2018)	3 March 1998	12 January 2000	1 year, 315 days	United Liberal Democrats	Kim Dae-jung (1998–2003)
32		Park Tae-joon 박태준 朴泰俊 (1927–2011)	13 January 2000	18 May 2000	126 days	United Liberal Democrats	Kim Dae-jung (1998–2003)
—		Lee Hun-jai 이헌재 李憲宰 (born 1944); Acting	19 May 2000	22 May 2000	3 days	Independent	Kim Dae-jung (1998–2003)
33		Lee Han-dong 이한동 李漢東 (1934–2021)	23 May 2000	10 July 2002	2 years, 48 days	United Liberal Democrats	Kim Dae-jung (1998–2003)
—		Chang Sang 장상 張裳 (born 1939); Acting	11 July 2002	31 July 2002	20 days	Independent	Kim Dae-jung (1998–2003)
—		Jeon Yun-churl 전윤철 田允喆 (born 1939); Acting	31 July 2002	9 August 2002	9 days	Independent	Kim Dae-jung (1998–2003)
—		Chang Dae-whan 장대환 張大煥 (born 1952); Acting	9 August 2002	10 September 2002	32 days	Independent	Kim Dae-jung (1998–2003)
34		Kim Suk-soo 김석수 金碩洙 (born 1932)	10 September 2002	26 February 2003	169 days	Independent	Kim Dae-jung (1998–2003)
34		Kim Suk-soo 김석수 金碩洙 (born 1932)	10 September 2002	26 February 2003	169 days	Independent	Roh Moo-hyun (2003–2008) Goh Kun (acting: 2004)
35		Goh Kun 고건 高建 (born 1938)	27 February 2003	24 July 2004	1 year, 148 days	Independent	Roh Moo-hyun (2003–2008) Goh Kun (acting: 2004)
—		Lee Hun-jai 이헌재 李憲宰 (born 1944); Acting	25 July 2004	30 July 2004	5 days	Independent	Roh Moo-hyun (2003–2008) Goh Kun (acting: 2004)
36		Lee Hae-chan 이해찬 李海瓚 (1952–2026)	30 July 2004	15 March 2006	1 year, 228 days	Uri	Roh Moo-hyun (2003–2008) Goh Kun (acting: 2004)
—		Han Duck-soo 한덕수 韓悳洙 (born 1949); Acting	16 March 2006	19 April 2006	34 days	Independent	Roh Moo-hyun (2003–2008) Goh Kun (acting: 2004)
37		Han Myeong-sook 한명숙 韓明淑 (born 1944)	20 April 2006	6 March 2007	320 days	Uri	Roh Moo-hyun (2003–2008) Goh Kun (acting: 2004)
—		Kwon O-kyu 권오규 權五奎 (born 1952); Acting	7 March 2007	2 April 2007	26 days	Independent	Roh Moo-hyun (2003–2008) Goh Kun (acting: 2004)
38		Han Duck-soo 한덕수 韓悳洙 (born 1949)	2 April 2007	29 February 2008	333 days	Independent	Roh Moo-hyun (2003–2008) Goh Kun (acting: 2004)
38		Han Duck-soo 한덕수 韓悳洙 (born 1949)	2 April 2007	29 February 2008	333 days	Independent	Lee Myung-bak (2008–2013)
39		Han Seung-soo 한승수 韓昇洙 (born 1936)	29 February 2008	28 September 2009	1 year, 212 days	Grand National	Lee Myung-bak (2008–2013)
40		Chung Un-chan 정운찬 鄭雲燦 (born 1947)	29 September 2009	11 August 2010	316 days	Independent	Lee Myung-bak (2008–2013)
—		Yoon Jeung-hyun 윤증현 尹增鉉 (born 1946); Acting	11 August 2010	1 October 2010	51 days	Grand National	Lee Myung-bak (2008–2013)
41		Kim Hwang-sik 김황식 金滉植 (born 1948)	1 October 2010	26 February 2013	2 years, 148 days	Independent	Lee Myung-bak (2008–2013)
41		Kim Hwang-sik 김황식 金滉植 (born 1948)	1 October 2010	26 February 2013	2 years, 148 days	Independent	Park Geun-hye (2013–2017) Hwang Kyo-ahn (acting: 2016–2017)
42		Chung Hong-won 정홍원 鄭烘原 (born 1944)	26 February 2013	16 February 2015	1 year, 355 days	Independent	Park Geun-hye (2013–2017) Hwang Kyo-ahn (acting: 2016–2017)
43		Lee Wan-koo 이완구 李完九 (1950–2021)	17 February 2015	27 April 2015	69 days	Saenuri	Park Geun-hye (2013–2017) Hwang Kyo-ahn (acting: 2016–2017)
—		Choi Kyoung-hwan 최경환 崔炅煥 (born 1955); Acting	27 April 2015	18 June 2015	52 days	Saenuri	Park Geun-hye (2013–2017) Hwang Kyo-ahn (acting: 2016–2017)
44		Hwang Kyo-ahn 황교안 黃敎安 (born 1957)	18 June 2015	11 May 2017	1 year, 327 days	Independent	Park Geun-hye (2013–2017) Hwang Kyo-ahn (acting: 2016–2017)
44		Hwang Kyo-ahn 황교안 黃敎安 (born 1957)	18 June 2015	11 May 2017	1 year, 327 days	Independent	Moon Jae-in (2017–2022)
—		Yoo Il-ho 유일호 柳一鎬 (born 1955); Acting	11 May 2017	31 May 2017	20 days	Liberty Korea	Moon Jae-in (2017–2022)
45		Lee Nak-yon 이낙연 李洛淵 (born 1951)	31 May 2017	14 January 2020	2 years, 228 days	Democratic (2015)	Moon Jae-in (2017–2022)
46		Chung Sye-kyun 정세균 丁世均 (born 1950)	14 January 2020	16 April 2021	1 year, 92 days	Democratic (2015)	Moon Jae-in (2017–2022)
—		Hong Nam-ki 홍남기 洪楠基 (born 1960); Acting	16 April 2021	13 May 2021	27 days	Independent	Moon Jae-in (2017–2022)
47		Kim Boo-kyum 김부겸 金富謙 (born 1958)	14 May 2021	11 May 2022	362 days	Democratic (2015)	Moon Jae-in (2017–2022)
47		Kim Boo-kyum 김부겸 金富謙 (born 1958)	14 May 2021	11 May 2022	362 days	Democratic (2015)	Yoon Suk Yeol (2022–2025) Han Duck-soo (acting: 2024–2025) Choi Sang-mok (acting: 2024–2025) Han Duck-soo (acting: 2025) Lee Ju-ho (acting: 2025)
—		Choo Kyung-ho 추경호 秋慶鎬 (born 1960); Acting	12 May 2022	20 May 2022	8 days	People Power	Yoon Suk Yeol (2022–2025) Han Duck-soo (acting: 2024–2025) Choi Sang-mok (acting: 2024–2025) Han Duck-soo (acting: 2025) Lee Ju-ho (acting: 2025)
48		Han Duck-soo (Note: Han Duck-soo was suspended on 27 December 2024, after the National Assembly impeached him. Han was reinstated on 24 March 2025, after the Constitutional Court overturned his impeachment.) 한덕수 韓悳洙 (born 1949)	21 May 2022	1 May 2025	2 years, 345 days	Independent	Yoon Suk Yeol (2022–2025) Han Duck-soo (acting: 2024–2025) Choi Sang-mok (acting: 2024–2025) Han Duck-soo (acting: 2025) Lee Ju-ho (acting: 2025)
—		Choi Sang-mok 최상목 崔相穆 (born 1963); Acting	27 December 2024	24 March 2025	87 days	Independent	Yoon Suk Yeol (2022–2025) Han Duck-soo (acting: 2024–2025) Choi Sang-mok (acting: 2024–2025) Han Duck-soo (acting: 2025) Lee Ju-ho (acting: 2025)
—		Lee Ju-ho 이주호 李周浩 (born 1961); Acting	2 May 2025	4 July 2025	62 days	Independent	Yoon Suk Yeol (2022–2025) Han Duck-soo (acting: 2024–2025) Choi Sang-mok (acting: 2024–2025) Han Duck-soo (acting: 2025) Lee Ju-ho (acting: 2025)
—		Lee Ju-ho 이주호 李周浩 (born 1961); Acting	2 May 2025	4 July 2025	62 days	Independent	Lee Jae Myung (since 2025)
49		Kim Min-seok 김민석 金民錫 (born 1964)	4 July 2025	30 June 2026	361 days	Democratic (2015)	Lee Jae Myung (since 2025)
50		Han Seong-sook 한성숙 韓聖淑 (born 1967)	1 July 2026	Incumbent	107 days	Independent	Lee Jae Myung (since 2025)

== See also ==
- Deputy Prime Minister of South Korea
- List of presidents of South Korea
- List of prime ministers of Korea
