= August 1960 South Korean presidential election =

- 12 August 1960

263 members of the National Assembly 176 votes needed to win
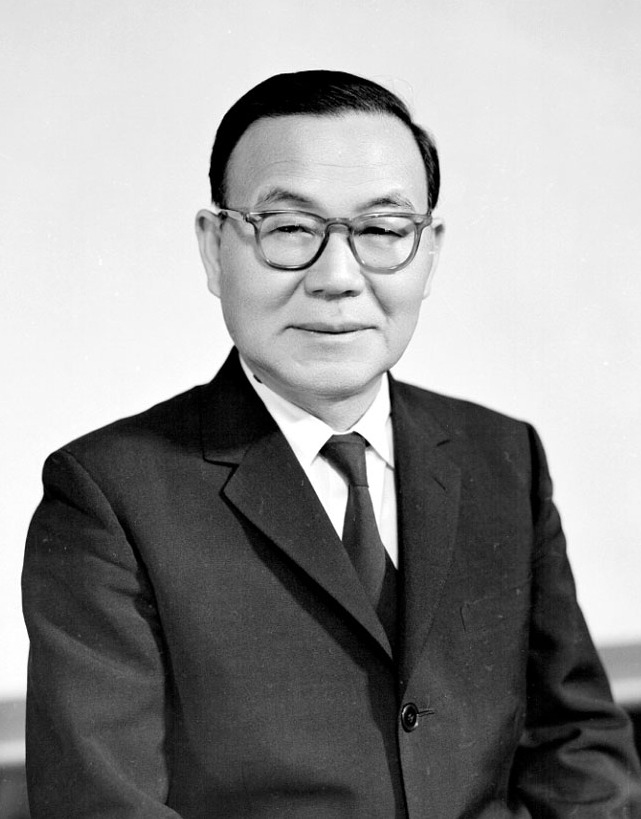

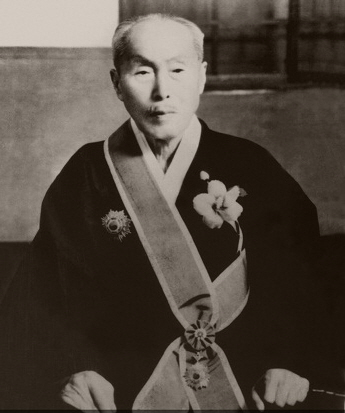
| Nominee | Yun Po-sun | Kim Chang-sook |
| Party | Democratic | Independent |
| Electoral vote | 208 | 29 |
President before election
Paek Nak-chun (acting)
Independent
Elected President
Yun Posun
Democratic

Indirect presidential elections were held in South Korea on 12 August 1960, which saw the election of Yun Posun as President of the Republic of Korea, a ceremonial political position in the Second Republic. Held after the April Revolution which had forced the resignation of Syngman Rhee, it was the only presidential election to be held during the short era of the Second Republic, as the Republic folded after Park Chung Hee's May Coup the next year. The election was indirect, with a joint session of the House of Commons and Senate, which had been elected in July, acting as the electors. The winning candidate required the assent of two thirds of the members of both houses.

== Background ==
The First Republic's presidency had broad executive power. However, due in large part to Rhee's authoritarian excesses, the framers of the 1960 Constitution opted for a parliamentary system. The presidency's powers were greatly reduced, to a point almost entirely ceremonial and representative in nature. Real power was vested in the Prime Minister.

The Democratic Party, founded in 1955 as a merger of the Democratic Nationalist Party (DNP) and several anti-Rhee administration groups, had won well over two-thirds of the seats in the National Assembly in the July 1960 legislative elections, and was sure to win the presidency.

However, members of the party from the DNP and those from other groups clashed strongly after the Rhee administration fell. As a result, the party was not united on whom to elect for the president. The divisions were so deep that by 4 August, the DNP faction of the Democratic Party officially declared that they would break away to form a new party.

As a result, the two factions of the Democratic Party nominated different presidential candidates; the DNP faction declared they would seek to take both the presidency and the prime minister, while the non-DNP faction said they would only take the prime minister and let the DNP faction have the presidency. This was a move by the non-DNP faction to persuade the DNP faction not to break away.

The leaders of the non-DNP faction met on 11 August in the morning and announced they would nominate Yun Posun for the presidency and Chang Myon as prime minister. Yun was the de facto leader of the DNP faction and was almost certain to be the faction's nominee for the presidency. Chang Myon was the incumbent president of the Democratic Party and de facto leader of the non-DNP faction.

The leaders of the DNP faction met on the evening of the same day and announced they would nominate Yun for the presidency and Kim Do-yeon as prime minister. While Yun and Kim, the two major leaders of the DNP faction, had both expressed interest for the prime ministerial nomination, Yun agreed in the end to settle for the presidency in order to prevent intra-factional division.

== Results ==
In order to be elected, a candidate had to receive at the vote of at least two-thirds of the National Assembly members in office at the time. As there were 263 members in office at the time of the election, 220 in the House of Commons and 43 in the Senate, a candidate had to receive at least 176 votes to be elected.

Yun was elected with 208 votes, having been nominated by both factions of the Democratic Party. His closest competitor was Kim Chang-sook, a former independence activist supported by some of the independent members of the National Assembly, who received 29 votes.

| Candidate | Party | Votes | % |
|---|---|---|---|
| Yun Posun | Democratic Party | 208 | 82.21 |
| Kim Chang-sook | Independent | 29 | 11.46 |
| Baek Nak-jun | Independent | 3 | 1.19 |
| Byeon Yeong-tae | Independent | 3 | 1.19 |
| Kim Do-yeon | Democratic Party | 2 | 0.79 |
| Heo Jeong | Independent | 2 | 0.79 |
| Kim Pyeung-roh | Independent | 1 | 0.40 |
| Kim Shi-hyeon | Independent | 1 | 0.40 |
| Na Yeong-gyun | Democratic Party | 1 | 0.40 |
| Bak Sun-cheon | Democratic Party | 1 | 0.40 |
| Yu Ok-woo | Democratic Party | 1 | 0.40 |
| Lee Chul-seung | Democratic Party | 1 | 0.40 |
| Total | | 253 | 100.00 |
| Valid votes | | 253 | 97.68 |
| Invalid/blank votes | | 6 | 2.32 |
| Total votes | | 259 | 100.00 |
| Registered voters/turnout | | 263 | 98.48 |

== See also ==
- Prime Ministers of South Korea
- List of prime ministers of South Korea
