= Uncle Samsik =

2024 South Korean television series

- Promotional poster
- Hangul: 삼식이 삼촌
- Hanja: 三食이 三寸
- RR: Samsigi samchon
- MR: Samsigi samch'on
- Genre: Period drama; Political
- Written by: Shin Yeon-shick
- Directed by: Shin Yeon-shick
- Starring: Song Kang-ho; Byun Yo-han; Lee Kyu-hyung; Jin Ki-joo; Seo Hyun-woo
- Music by: Lee Eun-joo
- Country of origin: South Korea
- Original language: Korean
- No. of episodes: 16

Production
- Executive producers: Jung Yeon-ji; Kim Min
- Producers: Kang Bo-young; Ahn Chang-ho
- Cinematography: Kim Tae-kyung; Jung Sung-min
- Editor: Kim Jung-hoon
- Running time: 42–45 minutes
- Production companies: Slingshot Studio; Arc Media
- Budget: ₩40 billion

Original release
- Network: Disney+
- Release: May 15 – June 19, 2024

Uncle Samsik (Korean: 삼식이 삼촌) is a 2024 South Korean television series written and directed by Shin Yeon-shick, and starring Song Kang-ho, Byun Yo-han, Lee Kyu-hyung, Jin Ki-joo, and Seo Hyun-woo. It is Song's first drama series since his debut. It was released worldwide on Disney+ and on Hulu in the USA from May 15, to June 19, 2024.

== Synopsis ==
Set amid the turbulent backdrop of the 1960s, the series depicts the passionate desire and bromance between Uncle Samsik, who ate three meals a day even during the Korean War, and the elite Kim San, bound together by love, trust, and doubt.

== Cast ==
=== Main ===
- Song Kang-ho as Park Doo-chil ("Uncle Samsik")

A person with his own iron rule of never going without three meals a day even while living in a turbulent era.

- Byun Yo-han as Kim San

Top elite graduate of the Korea Military Academy who dreams of making Korea an industrial country.

- Lee Kyu-hyung as Kang Seong-min

Liberal Party assemblyman who is a candidate for the next leader.

- Jin Ki-joo as Joo Yeo-jin

Kim San's lover and Joo In-tae's daughter.

=== Supporting ===
==== Cheongwoo Federation ====
- Joo Jin-mo as Ahn Yo-seop

Chairman of the Cheongwoo Federation and CEO of Segang Textiles.

- Oh Seung-hoon as Ahn Ki-chul

Ahn Yo-seop's youngest son and director of Segang Textiles.

- Kim Min-jae as Yoo Yeon-cheol

A self-made businessman and president of Daemyeon Construction.

- Choi Hong-il as Professor Hwang

==== Albright Foundation ====
- Lee Ga-sub as Kim Kwang-min

CEO of Sanae Corporation, Kim San's friend and Albright classmate.

- Tiffany Young as Rachel Jeong

Michael's younger sister and Albright Foundation director.

- Jasper Cho as Michael Jeong

Ahn Yo-seop's secretary, Rachel's older brother and Albright Foundation director.

==== Military ====
- Seo Hyun-woo as Jung Han-min

An elite soldier from the Military Academy who dreams of reforming the military.

- Yoo Jae-myung as Jang Doo-sik

Major General of the Military Logistics Command.

- Ryu Sung-hyun as Hong Young-ki

Head of the Counter Intelligence Corps (CIC).

- Kim Yool-ho as Baek Hyun-seok

Colonel of the Intelligence Department at the Army Headquarters, in charge of interrogating Kim San.

- Ryu Tae-ho as Choi Han-rim

A prestigious general who takes care of Kim San. Based on Lee Han-lim.

==== Liberal Party ====
- Park Hyuk-kwon as Choi Min-gyu

Minister of Home Affairs who collaborates with the Liberal Party. Based on Choi In-gyu.

- Ji Hyun-joon as Cha Tae-min

A person who helped Kang Seong-min in the past and leader of the Sineui Alliance.

- Choo Sang-rok as Park Ji-wook

Liberal Party assemblyman and former police officer during the Japanese occupation.

==== Organized crime ====
- Roh Jae-won as Han-soo

Leader of the Seodaemun gang.

- Koo Seong-hwan as Gu Hae-jun

A member of the Seodaemun gang.

- Moon Jong-won as Yoon Pal-bong

Leader of the Dongdaemun gang who carries out orders for Kang Seong-min.

==== Others ====
- Oh Kwang-rok as Joo In-tae

A politician who insists on national prosperity and peaceful coexistence. Based on Cho Bong-am.

- Ryu Joo-han as Ahn Min-chul

Ahn Yo-seop's eldest son who was a Liberal Party assemblyman in 1946.

- Do Jeong-hwan as Lee Soo-il

Captain of the 55th Howitzer Regiment, in charge of interrogating Han-min.

- Kim Jong-goo as Seon Woo-seok

Democratic Party member.

- Lee Hyun-kyun as Oh In-woo

A reporter for Aemin Ilbo, who is Yeo-jin's senior in college.

- Lee Ho-seok as Lee Ho-seok

An activist university student.

== Background and production ==
=== Main historical events depicted in Uncle Samsik ===
- The March 1960 South Korean presidential election: Also described as the March 15 Election Fraud, the election saw the re-election of President Syngman Rhee, who had been in power since the establishment of the First Republic of Korea in 1948. The elections were heavily rigged in Rhee's favor, and widespread allegations of corruption and manipulation of the results sparked protests which spiralled into the April Revolution.
- The April Revolution: A series of protests and demonstrations driven by students and ordinary citizens who demanded democratic reforms and Rhee's resignation. The intensity of the protests eventually forced Syngman Rhee to resign on April 26, 1960, ending his 12-year rule.

=== Development ===
A media article reported that the drama is being discussed for release on Disney+. It was initially reported that it was scheduled to be broadcast in the second half of 2023, but it is expected that a decision will be made only after the programming is finalized.

== Release ==
On April 1, 2024, Disney+ revealed Uncle Samsik's release date. It launched with a five-episode premiere on May 15, 2024 exclusively on Disney+ internationally and on Hulu in the U.S. The 16-episode series will then have two episodes per week until a three-part season finale on June 19.

== Accolades ==
=== Awards and nominations ===
Name of the award ceremony, year presented, category, nominee of the award, and the result of the nomination
Award ceremony	Year	Category	Nominee / Work	Result	Ref.
Asia Contents Awards & Global OTT Awards	2024	Best OTT Original	Uncle Samsik	Nominated	
Asia Contents Awards & Global OTT Awards	2024	Best Newcomer Actress	Tiffany Young	Nominated	
Blue Dragon Series Awards	2024	Best Actor	Byun Yo-han	Nominated	
Blue Dragon Series Awards	2024	Best Supporting Actor	Lee Kyu-hyung	Nominated	
Blue Dragon Series Awards	2024	Best Supporting Actress	Tiffany Young	Nominated	
Seoul International Drama Awards	2024	Best Actor (International)	Song Kang-ho	Won	
Seoul International Drama Awards	2024	Outstanding Korean Drama	Uncle Samsik	Nominated	

=== Listicles ===
Name of publisher, year listed, name of listicle, and placement
Publisher	Year	Listicle	Placement	Ref.
South China Morning Post	2024	The 15 best K-dramas of 2024	12th place	
