= Committees in the National Assembly of South Korea =

Committees in the National Assembly of South Korea propose and debate bills. There are two types of committees: standing committees and special committees.As of the 2018 Amendment to the National Assembly Act, there are 17 standing committees in the National Assembly. Many committees have been added or removed from the National Assembly through amendments to the National Assembly Act.

== Background ==
There are two types of committees in the National Assembly: standing committees and special committees. Special committees look into essential issues. Standing committees were established under the jurisdiction of the executive branch. Committees can propose and debate legislative bills. They can also discard bills or not report a bill to a plenary session, deciding the fate of a bill. The chairs of the committees are elected by a plenary session. Members of the National Assembly are assigned to committees every two years. The staff of the committee members can influence through analysing bills delegated by the committee members.

As of the 2018 Amendment to the National Assembly Act, the 17 standing committees of the National Assembly are the Steering Committee, Legislation and Judiciary Committee, National Policy Committee, Strategy and Finance Committee, Science, ICT and Broadcasting Communications Committee, Education Committee, Culture, Sports and Tourism Committee, Foreign Affairs and Unification Committee, National Defense Committee, Security and Public Affairs Committee, Agriculture, Food, Rural Affairs, Oceans and Fisheries Committee, Trade, Industry, Energy, SMEs and Startups Committee, Health and Welfare Committee, Environment and Labor Committee, Land and Transportation Committee, Intelligence Committee, and Gender Equality and Family Committee.

== History ==
Committees were used in 1948 Constitutional Assembly. There initially were 8 standing committees. 4 more standing committees were added with the Second Amendment to the National Assembly Act on March 15, 1951. The Budget and Accounts Committee was added with the Fourth Amendment to the National Assembly Act on January 22, 1953. The committee became responsible for budget bills that were previously managed by the Finance and Economy Committee.

During the Second Republic, the House of Representatives had 13 committees and the House of Councillors had 9 committees. The Budget and Accounts Committee became a special standing committee with the Amendment to the National Assembly Act of the Third Republic, which decreased the number of standing committees to 12. Under the Fourth Republic, the Finance and Economy Committee was split into the Finance Committee and Economic Policy Committee. The Amendment to the National Assembly Act of the Sixth Republic added the Administrative Committee, the Power Resources Committee, and Labor Committee. The Amendment to the National Assembly Act of 1994 created the Intelligence Committee. The amendment to the National Assembly Act of the next year combined the Construction and Transportation Committee and the Transportation Committee.

The 2002 Amendment to the National Assembly Act created the Gender Equality Committee. The 2008 Amendment to the National Assembly Act combined the Education Committee and Science and Technology, and the authority over family affairs was given to the Health and Welfare Committee. The 2018 Amendment to the National Assembly Act separated the Educational Committee and Science and Technology Committee. In September 2025, the National Assembly passed an act to rename the Strategy and Finance Committee to the Finance and Economic Planning Committee, the Environment and Labor Committee to the Climate Energy, Environment and Labor Committee. The Gender Committee was also renamed. In February 2026, the National Assembly created a special committee to deal with United States tariff negotiations.
