= 1960 South Korean parliamentary election =

← 1958	29 June 1960	1963 →
- House of Representatives election

All 233 seats in the House of Representatives 117 seats needed for a majority
- Turnout: 84.3% (▼3.5 pp)
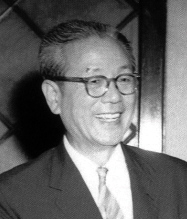

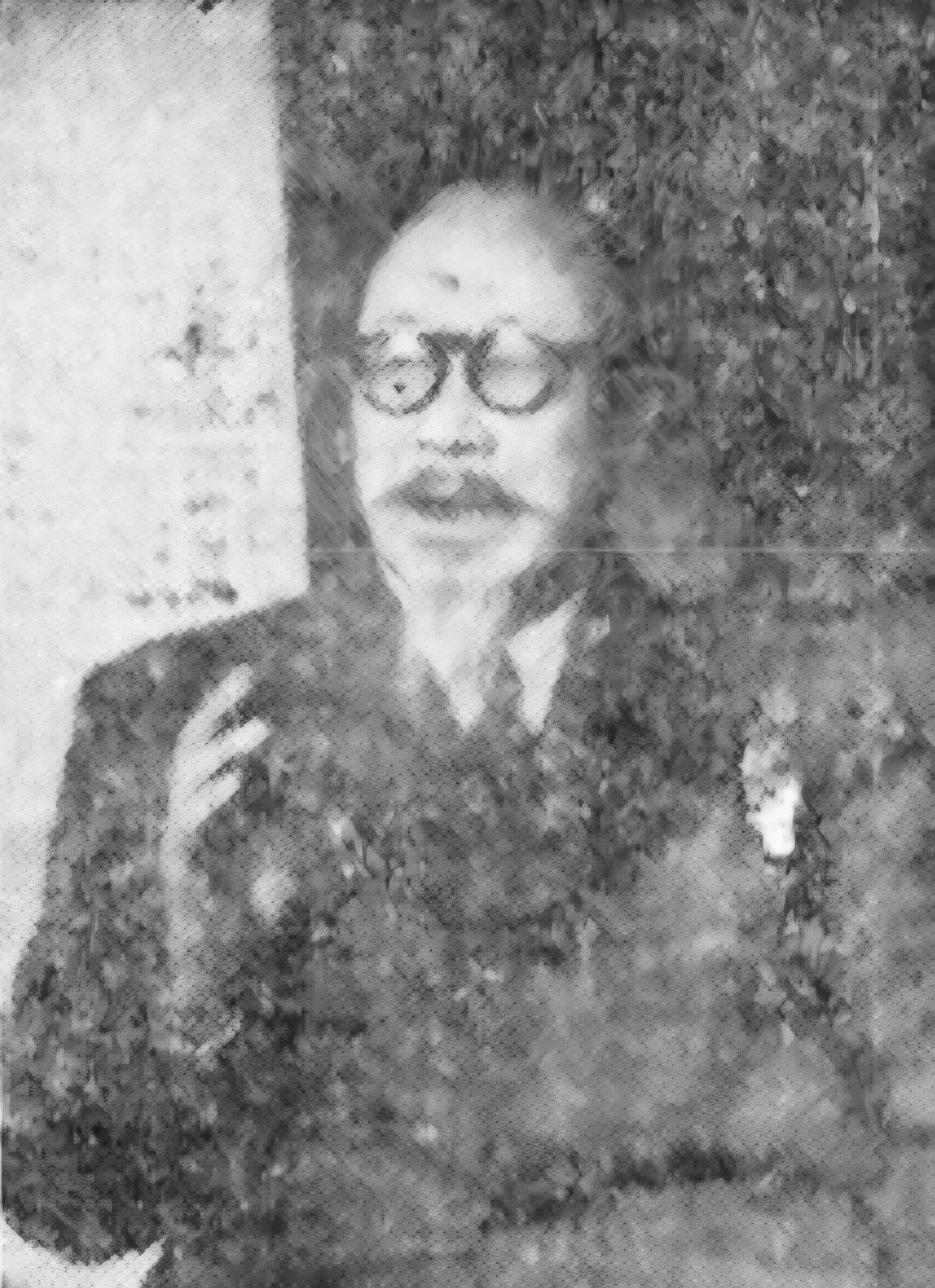

	First party	Second party	Third party
Leader	Chang Myon	Seo Sang-il	Cho Gyeong-gyu
Party	Democratic	Socialist Mass	Liberal
Last election	79 seats	–	126 seats
Seats won	175	4	2
Seat change	▲96	New	▼124
Popular vote	3,786,304	541,021	249,960
Percentage	41.71%	5.96%	2.75%
Swing	▲7.72pp	New	▼39.32pp
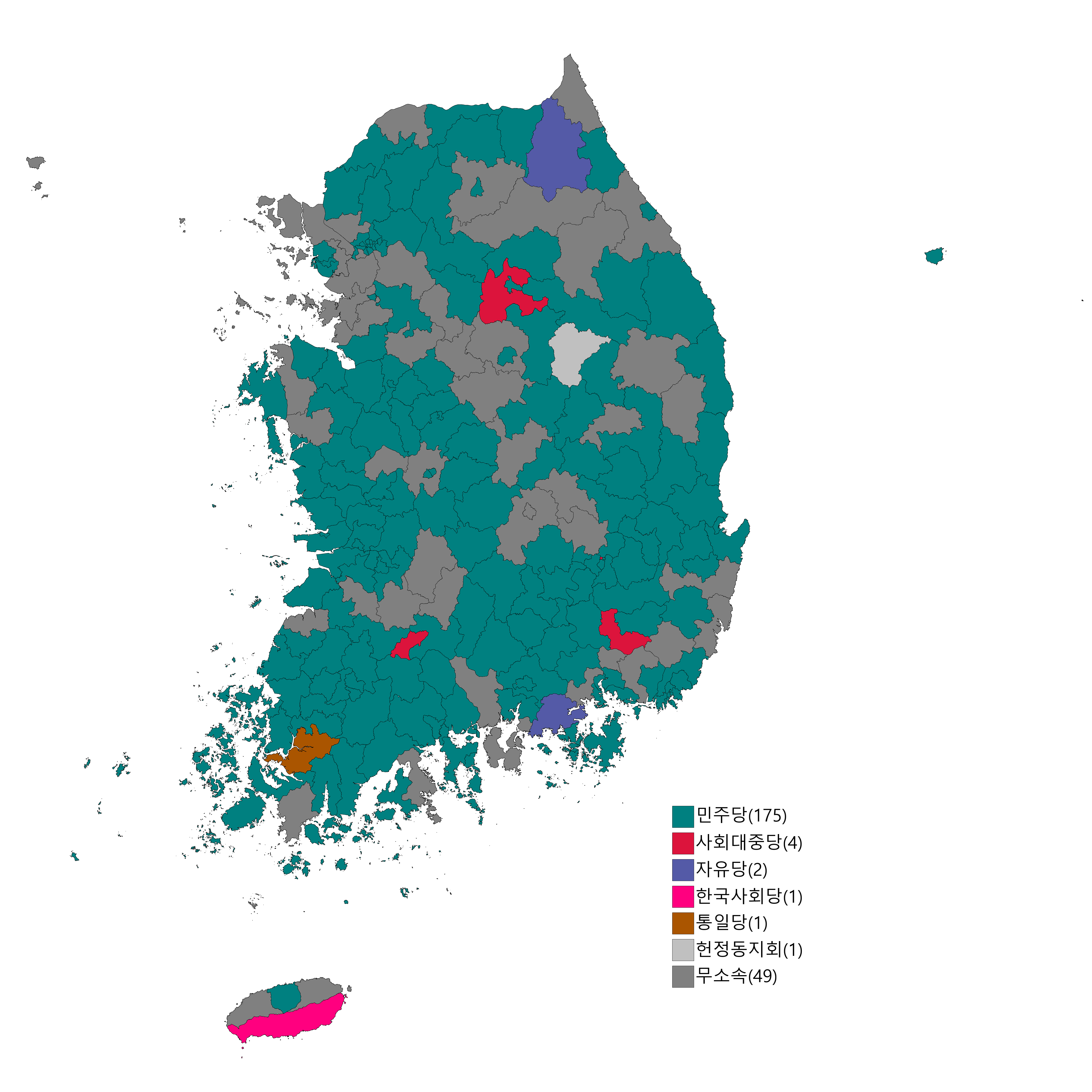
- Results by constituency
Speaker before election
Kwak Sang-hoon
Democratic
Elected Speaker
Kwak Sang-hoon
Democratic
- House of Councillors election

All 58 seats in the House of Councillors 30 seats needed for a majority
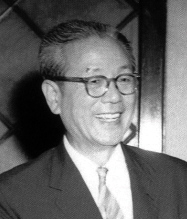
	First party	Second party
Leader	Chang Myon	Cho Gyeong-gyu
Party	Democratic	Liberal
Seats won	31	4
Popular vote	5,491,527	653,748
Percentage	51.41%	6.12%

Parliamentary elections were held in South Korea on 29 June 1960. They were the first and only direct elections of the Second Republic and saw the first election of members of the new House of Councillors, together with the fifth election of members of the House of Representatives. They were also the first relatively free and fair national elections held in the country, but would be the last free elections until the 1987 presidential elections. Voter turnout was 84.3%.

The elections took place after President Rhee Syngman amended the constitution and won a third term in the uncontested March 1960 presidential election, which prompted the pro-democracy April Revolution and removed Rhee from power.

The Democratic Party, which had been the opposition party under former President Rhee, received the most votes (42%) in the House of Representatives election, winning 175 of 233 seats, while its 51% vote share in the House of Councillors elections saw it win 31 of the 58 seats. It was the first time that a liberal party won an election in South Korea, but the Democratic Party and its liberal successors would not win an election again until the 1997 presidential election and would not win a legislative election until 2004. Independent politicians received a significant portion of the vote, with 47% of the vote in the House of Representatives elections and 38% of the vote in the House of Councillors elections.

The government formed after the elections was overthrown within less than a year by Park Chung-hee in a coup on 16 May 1961. Park subsequently re-established the presidential system under a military government and served as president of South Korea from 1962 to 1979.

== Electoral system ==
The members of the House of Representatives were elected via first-past-the-post voting. Members of the House of Councillors were elected via partial block voting in constituencies of between two and eight seats corresponding to the provinces and Seoul, where voters could cast ballots for up to half of the candidates running in their constituency.

== Results ==
=== House of Representatives ===
Party	Votes	%	Seats	+/–
Democratic Party	3,786,401	41.71	175	+96
Socialist Mass Party	541,021	5.96	4	New
Liberal Party	249,960	2.75	2	–124
Korea Socialist Party	57,965	0.64	1	New
Korea Independence Party	26,649	0.29	0	New
Unification Party	17,293	0.19	1	0
Other parties	149,366	1.65	1	–
Independents	4,249,180	46.81	49	+22
Total	9,077,835	100.00	233	0
Valid votes	9,077,835	92.83		
Invalid/blank votes	701,086	7.17		
Total votes	9,778,921	100.00		
Registered voters/turnout	11,593,432	84.35		
Source: Nohlen et al.

==== By city/province ====
Region	Total seats	Seats won						
Region	Total seats	DP	SMP	LP	SP	UP	Other	Ind.
Seoul	16	15	0	0	0	0	0	1
Gyeonggi	25	14	0	0	0	0	0	11
Gangwon	20	12	1	1	0	0	0	6
North Chungcheong	13	9	0	0	0	0	1	3
South Chungcheong	22	18	0	0	0	0	0	4
North Jeolla	24	18	1	0	0	0	0	5
South Jeolla	32	29	0	0	0	1	0	2
North Gyeongsang	38	28	1	0	0	0	0	9
South Gyeongsang	40	31	1	1	0	0	0	7
Jeju	3	1	0	0	1	0	0	1
Total	233	175	4	2	1	1	1	49

=== House of Councillors ===
Party	Votes	%	Seats
Democratic Party	5,491,527	51.41	31
Liberal Party	653,748	6.12	4
Socialist Mass Party	146,059	1.37	1
Korea Socialist Party	135,160	1.27	1
Other parties	188,792	1.77	1
Independents	4,067,343	38.07	20
Total	10,682,629	100.00	58
Registered voters/turnout	11,593,432	–	
Source: Nohlen et al.

==== By city/province ====
Region	Total seats	Seats won					
Region	Total seats	DP	LP	SMP	SP	Other	Ind.
Seoul	6	4	0	0	0	0	2
Gyeonggi	6	3	1	0	0	0	2
Gangwon	4	3	0	0	0	0	1
North Chungcheong	4	3	1	0	0	0	0
South Chungcheong	6	2	1	1	0	0	2
North Jeolla	6	4	0	0	0	0	2
South Jeolla	8	4	1	0	0	0	3
North Gyeongsang	8	3	0	0	1	0	4
South Gyeongsang	8	4	0	0	0	1	3
Jeju	2	1	0	0	0	0	1
Total	58	31	4	1	1	1	20
