= SCNR =

SCNR may refer to:

- Fundo Naicura Airport (ICAO code: SCNR)
- Supreme Council for National Reconstruction, a military junta in South Korea in the 1960s
- The YouTube Channel and News network operated by Tim Pool
- The Signal-to-Clutter-plus-Noise Ratio, abbreviated to SCNR, is a parameter in radar signal processing.
- "Sorry, Could Not Resist" as a tag in an answer to an ambiguous question. The person answering "could not resist to give this specific (wrong but funny) answer," and tagged it scnr. This was a well known tag in Usenet times.
