= 1960 South Korean presidential election =

1960 South Korean presidential election may refer to:

- March 1960 South Korean presidential election
- August 1960 South Korean presidential election
