= Miracle on the Han River =

Rapid economic growth of South Korea

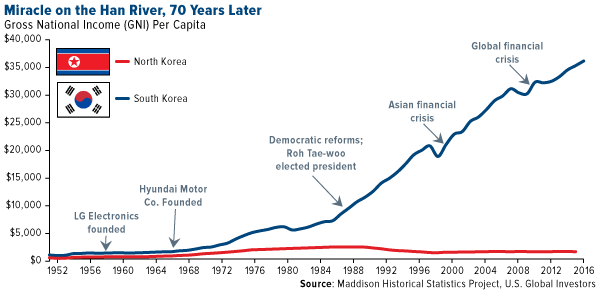
- South Korea's GNI per capita from 1950 to 2016 (in blue)

Korean name
- Hangul: 한강의 기적
- Hanja: 漢江의 奇蹟
- RR: Hangangui gijeok
- MR: Han'gangŭi kijŏk

The Miracle on the Han River (Korean: 한강의 기적) was the period of rapid economic growth in South Korea following the Korean War (1950–1953), during which South Korea transformed from an underdeveloped country into a highly developed country.

The rapid reconstruction and development of the South Korean economy during the latter half of the 20th century was accompanied by events such as the country's hosting of the 1988 Summer Olympics and its co-hosting of the 2002 FIFA World Cup, as well as the ascension of family-owned conglomerates known as chaebols, such as Samsung, LG, and Hyundai. This growth also encompassed declines in child mortality and increases in life expectancy. South Korea during this period has been described as "corporatist" or as practicing state capitalism. This period of growth was overseen by the Democratic Republican Party (DRP), a conservative, broadly state capitalist and nationalist party.

The growth has been attributed to the hard work of the labour force. External factors include the enormous economic and technical assistance provided by foreign countries, particularly Japan (see: Treaty on Basic Relations Between Japan and the Republic of Korea) and the United States, access to Western and Japanese markets, and the acquisition of foreign currency by Korean migrant workers in the early stages of economic growth.

Following the Miracle on the Han River, South Korea has been held as an economic model for other developing countries, and became the first non-G8 nation to host a G20 leaders' summit in November 2010.

== Origin of the phrase ==
The Han River is a major river which runs through and bisects Seoul.

In the early 1960s, South Korean politicians admired what they called the "Miracle on the Rhine": the surprising postwar economic growth of West Germany, which is often called the Wirtschaftswunder ("economic miracle").

In his 1961 New Year's address, Chang Myon, prime minister of the Second Republic of South Korea, used the phrase to encourage South Koreans in achieving a similar economic upturn. He said:

In order to achieve a so-called "Miracle of the Banks of the Han" ("한강변의 기적") comparable to Germany's, we should have austerity and diligence comparable to that of the Germans. (Note: "우리도 독일과 같이 이른바 한강변의 기적을 낳기 위해 독일사람 못지않은 내핍과 근로가 있기를 바라마지않습니다")

In June 1962, General James Van Fleet, who led US forces in Korea during part of the Korean War, gave a speech in Los Angeles entitled "The Miracle on the Han".

== History ==
=== Background ===
Between 1910 and 1945, Korea was annexed and became a part of the Japanese Empire. Partly as a result of Japanese capital investment, especially during the 1930s–1940s, it experienced a phase of moderate industrialization and economic growth. With the start of the Pacific War of World War II, the Korean economy declined when the Japanese mainland exploited Korea economically. By the end of the Pacific War, Korea was one of the poorest regions in the world.

=== 1948–1960: The First Republic and Korean War ===
The division of territory as a result of the Korean War further damaged Korean property by 25% and resulted in the establishment of the First Republic of South Korea, ruled by the Syngman Rhee administration until 1960. At this time, the economy was largely agricultural. Through the Farmland Reform Act of 1950, the United States Army Military Government in Korea redistributed previously Japanese-owned land, allowing the generation of private funds.

=== 1960–1961: The Second Republic ===
The Second Republic of South Korea existed for only one year, but had a great effect on economy and history of South Korea through ideology and policy. Prime Minister Chang Myon and the Democratic Party held a stance of extreme anti-communism (as did the First Republic), but also advocated an Economic First Policy with State-led Capitalism, promoting amity and economic cooperation with Japan.

=== 1961–1963: The SCNR ===
When a military coup in 1961 led by general Park Chung Hee overthrew the Democratic Party, the result was a military junta known as the Supreme Council for National Reconstruction (SCNR). During this time, the first national Five-Year Plan (1962–1966) was implemented, becoming an important factor in the Miracle on the Han River. It aimed to develop the nation's economy through expansion of agriculture and energy industries such as coal and electric power; development of basic industries such as chemical fertilizer, cement, oil refinery, iron, and steel; expansion of social overhead capital including roads, railways, and ports; full utilisation of idle resources including increased employment; conservation and utilisation of land; export promotion to improve the balance of payments; and promotion of science and technology. While this first Five-Year Plan did not bring about an immediately self-reliant economy, it brought a period of growth and modernization in preparation for long-term economic success and policy reform.

Park has been credited with increasing productivity within the South Korean workforce and thus contributing to the nation's economic success. Park's legacy has been controversial. While praised for his contributions to South Korea's economic recovery, he also systematically disregarded human rights and engaged in media censorship (because of anti-communist sentiment) as part of a military dictatorship. In the one-party regime of the SCNR, the leading party answered to a small constituency of the ruling or military elite, and South Korea's economic restoration was prioritised at the expense of human rights as Park utilized the abundant supply of cheap labor.

At the same time, morality laws established mandatory curfews and regulations on attire and music. In his program of Yushin Kaehyuk (Revitalizing Reforms), he caused Korean cinema to enter into a moribund period considered by many to be the lowest periods in the history of Korean cinema. Park had believed that South Korea was not ready to be a full democratic nation nor a free nation. Park argued that the poverty of the nation would make it vulnerable, and therefore an urgent task was to eliminate poverty rather than establish a democratic nation. During his presidency the Korean Central Intelligence Agency became a much feared institution and the government frequently imprisoned dissenters. Park Chung-hee's rule ended on October 26, 1979 when he was killed by his chief of security services, Kim Jae-gyu.

=== 1963–1972: The Third Republic ===
During the Third Republic, South Korea received US$800 million from Japan for property claims, and was mostly dependent on foreign aid, largely over US$119 billion from the United States in exchange for South Korea's involvement in the Vietnam War. The government used this money to accomplish a self-supporting economy, launching the Saemaeul movement in order to develop rural areas. The strong leadership of the government (though criticized as repressive and heavy-handed) as well as the effective use of cheap labor served as catalysts for the growth of the South Korean economy.

=== 1972–1981: The Fourth Republic ===
During the Fourth Republic, with the government backing heavy industries, electronics and steel industries flourished. Another benefit of government backing was the freedom for leaders in the industrial sector to spend money without feeling constrained by a budget due to the government's commitment to keep the business running. Money subsequently came pouring into the economy as consumer confidence in heavy industries grew.

=== 1981–1997: Market restructuring ===
By the end of 1995, South Korea had established itself as the eleventh largest economy in the world, in contrast to the bleak economic landscape at the end of the war. However, systemic problems remained within its political and financial systems. Earlier, whenever problems arose that hindered economic development, the junta harassed the wealthy for funding. The junta also gathered a group of high earners, who had attained their wealth due to their corrupt relations with Syngman Rhee. These people were known as the "illicit profiteers".

Financial troubles mounted as Korea received short-term relief from the United States when Treasury Secretary Robert Rubin and other senior officials agreed to a US$50 billion bailout package in exchange for drastic restructuring of Korea's markets. As the country came under pressure to restructure the financial sector and make it more transparent, market-oriented, and better supervised, its firms were obliged to restructure in a way that would allow international organizations to audit them.

Around December 1996, President Kim Young-sam announced that South Korea had gained recognition for its economy by joining the Organization for Economic Cooperation and Development, consisting of top industrial nations. President Kim then created a new labor law that retained the Federation of Korean Trade Unions, a large, state-controlled trade union, as the only officially approved labor organization for five more years, leaving the independent Korean Confederation of Trade Unions out in the cold.

=== 1997–1999: Currency crisis ===
In 1997, South Korea faced widespread economic disaster in the form of the East Asian financial crisis. The country's reserves were severely limited at US$6 billion, the majority of which was allocated for spending in the upcoming term. Kim Young-sam, the first nonmilitary President in thirty years, failed to protect the economy at the time, and President Kim Dae-jung (1998–2003) took over the office with considerable damage to repair. The new President was openly opposed to the chaebol and the financial and governmental system of the time, and his election along with the efforts of the citizens and US$58 billion put together by the International Monetary Fund, the country paid its debts and surmounted the problem. Thus, South Korea's financial crisis was severe, but relatively brief compared to other countries which experienced similar situations.

== Dominance of chaebol groups in Korean economy ==
According to George E. Ogle, ten chaebol families were responsible for 60 percent of the growth of the South Korean economy during the Miracle on the Han River. With the help of government and associations, chaebols are still an enormous influence on the Korean economy, though they are also accused of inhibiting small businesses or independent entrepreneurship through unethical behavior and corrupt practices. The Kim Young-sam government attempted to assist small businesses during its five-year term from 1993 to 1998 by providing more loans, but this did not deter the expansion of the chaebols. In 1992, Korea received the maximum rating of 100 on both wage rates and tax burdens or lack thereof (with Spain the next highest at 71, and the United States third at 55). In other words, the Korean state still fosters huge profits and other rewards for its large business conglomerates.

== See also ==
- Korean Wave
- Economy of South Korea
- Tourism in South Korea
