= Baek Nak-jun =

South Korean politician (1895–1985)

- Baek in 1962

Acting President of South Korea
- In office August 8, 1960 – August 12, 1960
- President: (Himself)
- Prime Minister: Ho Chong
- Vice President: Position abolished
- Preceded by: Ho Chong (acting)
- Succeeded by: Yun Po-sun

President of the House of Councillors
- In office August 8, 1960 – May 16, 1961
- Preceded by: Position established
- Succeeded by: Position abolished

Personal details
- Born: 용재(庸齋); March 9, 1895 Gwansam-ri, Gwanju-myeon, Chongju-gun, Pyongan Province, Joseon
- Died: January 13, 1985 (aged 89) Seoul, South Korea
- Resting place: Seoul National Cemetery
- Education: Park College (BA); Princeton University (MA); Yale University (PhD)

Korean name
- Hangul: 백낙준
- Hanja: 白樂濬
- RR: Baek Nakjun
- MR: Paek Nakchun

Art name
- Hangul: 용재
- Hanja: 庸齋
- RR: Yongjae
- MR: Yongjae

Baek Nak-jun (Korean: 백낙준; March 9, 1895 – January 13, 1985) was a South Korean politician, who was an acting president for a brief time during the Second Korean Republic, as well as the sole President of the House of Councilors. Baek was also known by his English name "George Paik" and his nickname "Yongjae" (용재).

== Early life and education ==
Baek was born on March 9, 1895, and was the second son among six children.

He attended Park College (1918–1922) receiving a Bachelor of Arts in History. He then attended Princeton Theological Seminary (1922–1925) receiving a Bachelor of Theology. He attended Princeton University (1923–1925) receiving a Masters of Arts in History. He attended Yale University (1925–1927) for a Doctorate in History. After his studies abroad, he taught theology at Choson Christian College in Seoul. In 1982 he received a Doctorate of Education from King Sejong University.

In 1957, Baek became the first president of Yonsei University, having led its predecessor Yonhi University prior to that institution's merger with Severance Medical College.

He has received several honorary degrees:

Doctor of Divinity from Park College 1948

Doctor of Humanities from Springfield College 1954

Doctor of Laws from DePauw University 1957

Doctor of Letters from Yonsei University 1965

He received the New York University Medal.

== Works ==
- The History of Protestant missions in Korea 1832-1910 (1929)

== See also ==
- April 19 Movement
- Politics of South Korea
- History of South Korea
- Syngman Rhee
- Park Chung Hee
