= House of Councillors (South Korea) =

1952–1961 upper house of South Korea

Type
- Type: Upper house of the National Assembly of South Korea

History
- Founded: 7 July 1952 (de jure); 8 August 1960 (de facto)
- Disbanded: 16 May 1961
- Seats: 58 (1960–1961)

Elections
- Voting system: Limited voting
- Last election: 29 June 1960

Korean name
- Hangul: 참의원
- Hanja: 參議院
- RR: Chamuiwon
- MR: Ch'amŭiwŏn

The House of Councillors (Korean: 참의원) was the upper house of the National Assembly of the Republic of Korea during its Second Republic. The House of Councillors was established by the Constitution of the Second Republic of Korea, which established a bicameral legislature. Officially, a House of Councillors was provided for by a 1952 amendment to the Constitution of the First Republic, but the House of Representatives acted as the only house in a unicameral legislature since the establishment of the House of Councillors was blocked by the dictatorial administration of Syngman Rhee.

== Leadership ==
=== President of the House of Councillors ===
President	Political party	Took office	Left office	Legislature
Baek Nak-jun 백낙준 白樂濬; Member for Seoul (1895–1985)	Independent	August 8, 1960	May 16, 1961	5th National Assembly

=== Vice President of the House of Councillors ===
Vice President	Political party	Took office	Left office	Legislature
So Seon-gyu 소선규 蘇宣奎; Member for North Jeolla (1903–1968)	Democratic	4 August 1948	30 May 1954	5th National Assembly

== See also ==
- National Assembly
- House of Representatives
