= Lee Han-lim (general) =

South Korean general (1921–2012)

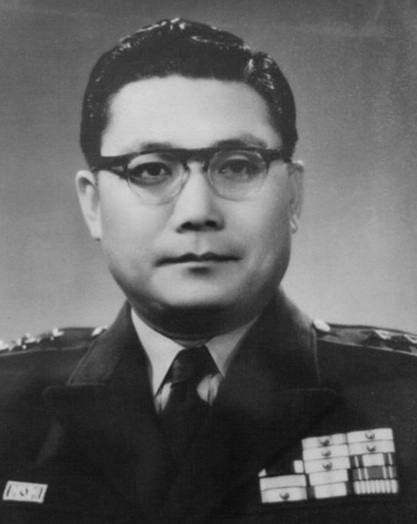
- Born: 10 February 1921; Anbyon County, Korea, Empire of Japan
- Died: 29 April 2012 (aged 91)
- Allegiance: Manchukuo; South Korea
- Branch: Manchukuo Imperial Army; Republic of Korea Army
- Rank: Lieutenant General
- Conflicts: Second Sino-Japanese War; Korean War
- Alma mater: University of California, Santa Barbara; Harvard University

Lee Han-lim (Korean: 이한림; Hanja: 李翰林; 10 February 1921 – 29 April 2012) was a South Korean soldier, entrepreneur, politician, and diplomat. He was born in Anbyun, Hamgyeongnam-do, and his pen name is Jeongam. He's Chang's name is Kazumi Kanrin (香住翰林). He is known for his political neutrality and being the only commanding officer to declare public opposition to the May 16 coup.

He served as commander of the 6th Army Corps, the 1st Army, Minister of Construction, and President of the Korea Tourism Organization. He is a collateral descendant of Lee Seung-hun (李承薰, baptismal name Peter), a martyr of the Sinyu Persecution and the first baptized son of the Roman Catholic Church in Korea.

== Career ==
He was born on 10 February 1921, the son of Heung-Han Lee, a wealthy middle-class farmer, to a family of devout Roman Catholics in Anbyun-gun, Hamgyeongnam-do. His family is also a collateral descendant of Lee Seung-hoon, who is also the first baptized person in the Roman Catholic Church in Korean history.

After graduating from Shinkyong Military Academy and studying at the Imperial Japanese Army Academy, he served as an officer in the Manchukuo Imperial Army. He is a classmate of Park Chung Hee at the Shinyeong Military Academy and the Imperial Japanese Army.

After the defeat of the Japanese, the Southern peninsula of Korea was administered by the U.S. military government. On 5 December 1945, he entered the first class of the Military English School and was commissioned on 26 February 1946.

During the Korean War, he served as the commander of the 9th Division and played a major role in securing the 'Iron Triangle' by repelling several Chinese attacks in the Battle of Geumhwa District.

After the Korean Armistice, in 1954 he was appointed commander of the 6th Corps.

Lee was appointed commander of the 1st Army in 1960.

== May 16 coup ==
In 1961, when he was serving as the commander of the 1st Army, the May 16 coup occurred. He opposed the military's intervention in politics and stood on the opposite line from those who led the military coup of Park Chung Hee. He had prepared to mobilize reserve forces to suppress the coup, but withdrew to prevent a civil war and potential North Korean invasion. Due to his opposition, he was arrested two days later and discharged along with the 5th District Commander and Army Major General Park Ki-byung.

== Later career and death ==
Lee was exiled and spent some time in the United States. Once he returned, he served a prison term due to his opposition to the military coup.

Afterwards, he was released and served as head of the Korea Water Resources Corporation in 1963 at the request of Park Chung Hee. In 1968, he was the head of Jinhae Chemical. He later served as Minister of Construction from 1969 to 1971, President of the Tourism Corporation in 1972, and as Ambassador to Turkey and Australia from 1974 to 1980.

In 2008, he was included on the list of people to be included in the pro-Japanese personal dictionary compiled by the Institute of National Studies.

He died on 29 April 2012 at the age of 91 and is interred at Daejeon National Cemetery.

== Personal life ==
He and his wife Song Soon-ok, both had two sons and three daughters (the eldest son Lee Seung-hoon, eldest daughter Lee Eun-jeong, second daughter Lee Eun-ju, second son Lee Jae-hoon, and third daughter Lee Eun-gyeong).

== Education ==
- Graduated from Manchukuo Fengtian First Middle School
- Graduated from Manchukuo Army Military Academy
- Graduated from Imperial Japanese Army Academy
- Republic of Korea Military English School 1st class
- Graduated from the Republic of Korea Army Infantry School
- Graduated from the United States. Army Infantry School
- Graduated from Korea Army Infantry School
- Korea National Defense University, Bachelor of Public Administration, 2nd class (February 1957)
- University of California, Santa Barbara, Graduate School of Political Science and M.A. in Political Science (August 1962)
- Master of Economics, Department of Economics, Graduate School of Economics, Harvard University, USA (August 1964)
- Master of Public Administration, Korea National Defense University (February 1971)

=== Honorary Bachelor's Degrees ===
- Korea Military Academy Honorary Bachelor of Literature (March 1986)
- Honorary Bachelor of Political Economy, Shenyang University, People's Republic of China (August 1996)

== Works ==
=== Memoir ===
- The Turbulence of the Century (1994)

== See also ==
- May 16 coup – 1961 military coup in South Korea
