= 1958 South Korean legislative election =

- 2 May 1958

All 233 seats in the House of Representatives 117 seats needed for a majority
- Turnout: 87.80% (▼3.34pp)
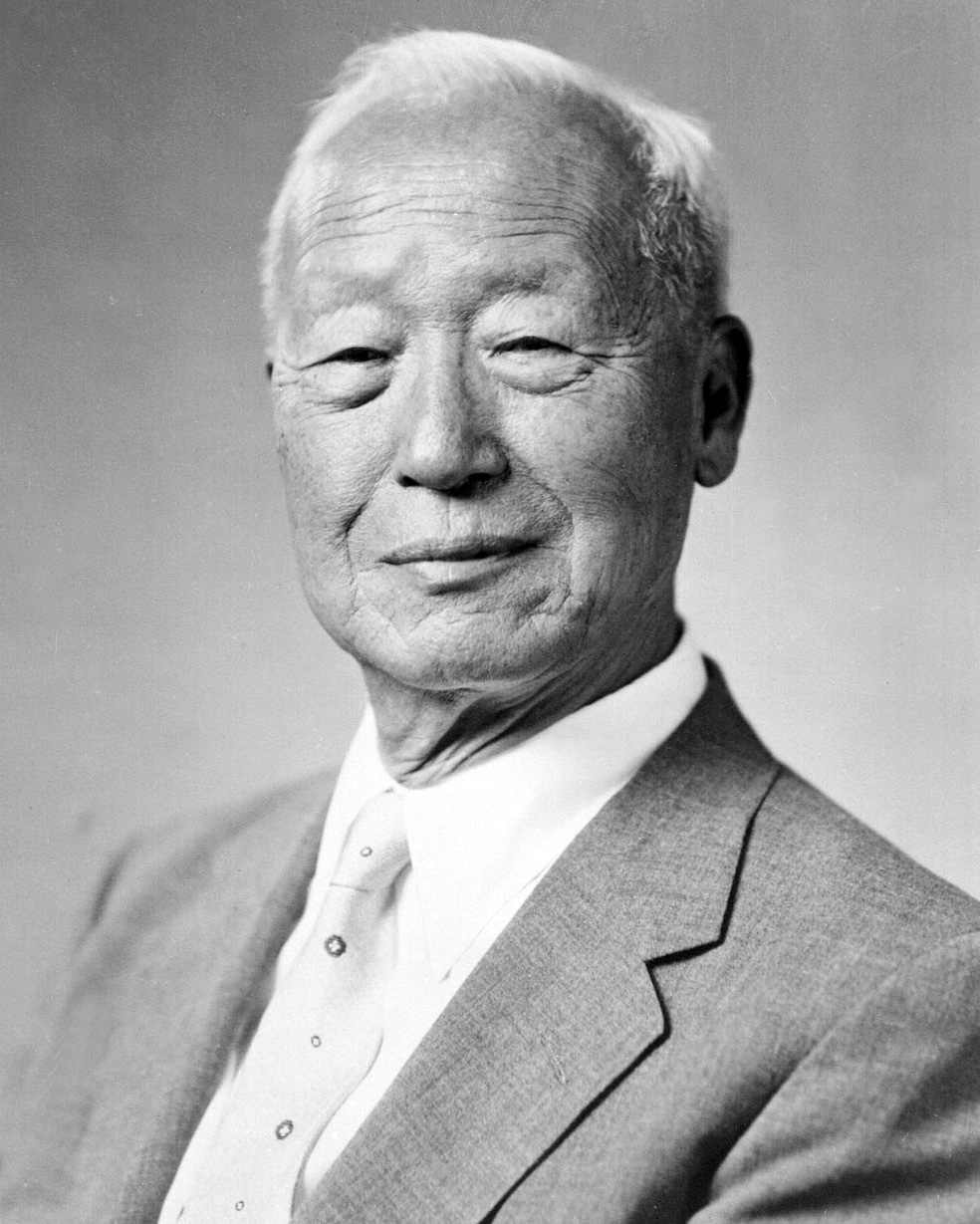

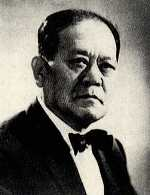
	Majority party	Minority party
Leader	Syngman Rhee	Chough Pyung-ok
Party	Liberal	Democratic
Last election	114 seats	15 seats (Note: as Democratic Nationalist Party)
Seats won	126	79
Seat change	▲12	▲64
Popular vote	3,607,092	2,914,049
Percentage	42.07%	33.99%
Swing	▲5.28pp	▲26.07pp
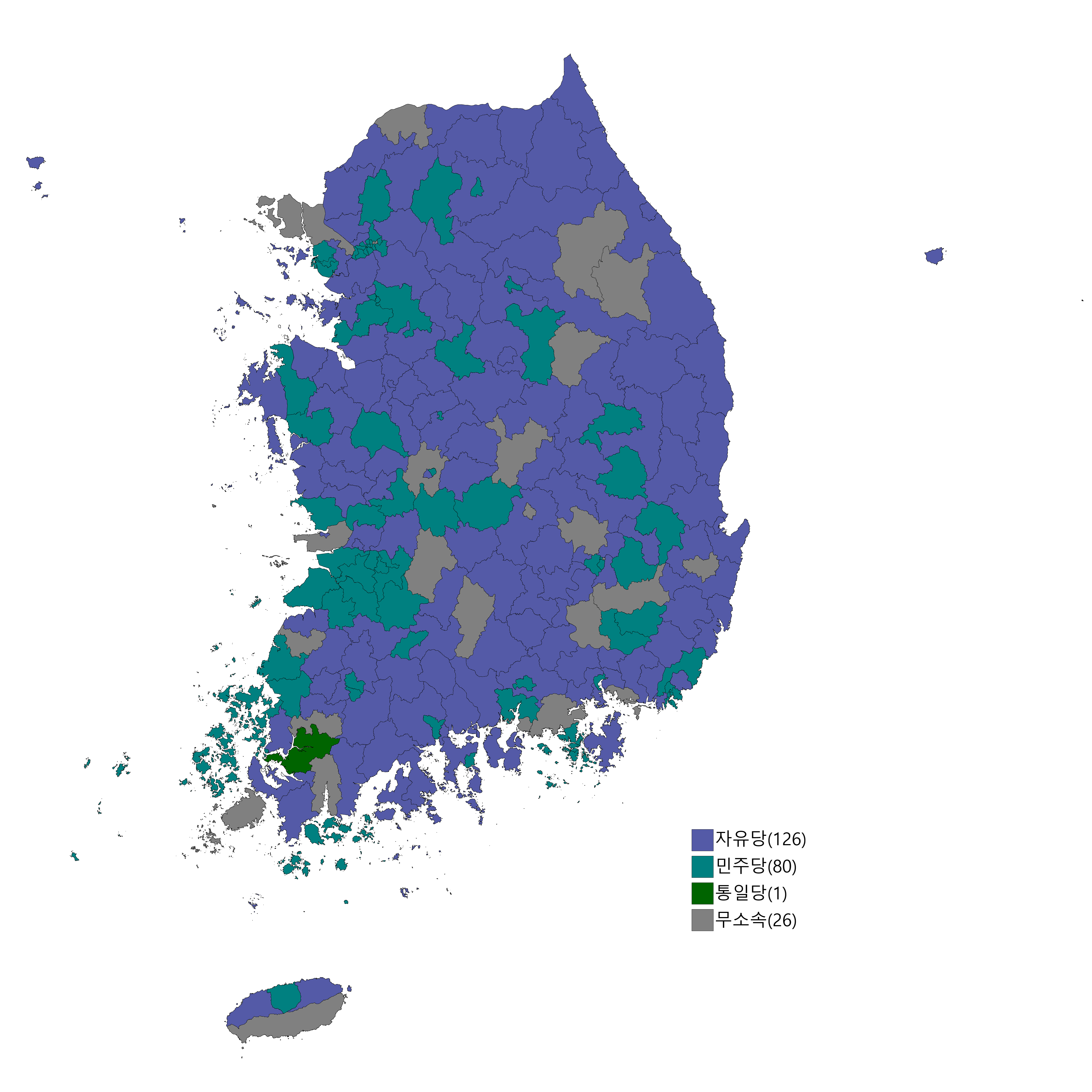
- Results by constituency
Speaker before election
Lee Ki-poong
Liberal
Elected Speaker
Lee Ki-poong
Liberal

Legislative elections were held in South Korea on 2 May 1958. The result was a victory for the Liberal Party, which won 126 of the 233 seats. Voter turnout was 87.8%.

== Electoral system ==
The elections were held under first-past-the-post voting.

== Results ==
Graph of the party split among 233 seats.
Party	Votes	%	Seats	+/–
Liberal Party	3,607,092	42.07	126	+12
Democratic Party	2,914,049	33.99	79	+64
Unification Party	53,716	0.63	1	New
National Association	50,568	0.59	0	–3
Other parties	90,160	1.05	0	–
Independents	1,857,707	21.67	27	–41
Total	8,573,292	100.00	233	+30
Valid votes	8,576,757	96.11		
Invalid/blank votes	347,148	3.89		
Total votes	8,923,905	100.00		
Registered voters/turnout	10,164,428	87.80		
Source: Nohlen et al. (Note: The results are inconsistent, with a difference of 3,465 between the party vote totals and the reported number of valid votes.)

=== By city/province ===
Region	Total seats	Seats won			
Region	Total seats	LP	DP	UP	Ind.
Seoul	16	1	14	0	1
Gyeonggi	25	14	8	0	3
Gangwon	20	15	2	0	3
North Chungcheong	13	8	4	0	1
South Chungcheong	22	15	6	0	1
North Jeolla	24	10	11	0	3
South Jeolla	32	18	10	1	3
North Gyeongsang	38	24	8	0	6
South Gyeongsang	40	20	15	0	5
Jeju	3	1	1	0	1
Total	233	126	79	1	27
