= Second Republic of Korea =

Government of South Korea from 1960 to 1961

Coordinates: 37°35′12″N 126°58′30″E

Republic of Korea 대한민국 大韓民國
- 1960–1961
- Flag Emblem
- Anthem: 애국가; Aegukga "The Patriotic Song"
- National seal "국새 (國璽)"

- Capital: Seoul
- Common languages: Korean
- Government: Unitary parliamentary republic
- President
  - 1960: Ho Chong (acting)
  - 1960: Kwak Sang-hoon (acting)
  - 1960: Ho Chong (acting)
  - 1960: Baek Nak-jun (acting)
  - 1960–1961: Yun Bo-seon
- Prime Minister
  - 1960: Heo Jeong
  - 1960–1961: Chang Myon
- Legislature: National Assembly
  - Upper house: House of Councillors
  - Lower house: House of Representatives
- Historical era: Cold War
  - Established: 15 June 1960
  - May 16 coup: 16 May 1961
- Currency: Hwan
Preceded by	Succeeded by
First Republic of Korea	Supreme Council for National Reconstruction
- Today part of: South Korea

The Second Republic of Korea (Korean: 제2공화국; RR: Je-i Gonghwaguk; lit. 'Second Republic') was the government of South Korea from June 1960 to May 1961.

The Second Republic was founded months after the April Revolution mass protests against President Syngman Rhee, succeeding the First Republic and establishing a parliamentary government under President Yun Posun and Prime Minister Chang Myon. The Second Republic ended Rhee's authoritarianism and repression, formed a liberal democracy, and formulated the first Five-Year Plans to develop the formerly neglected economy. After thirteen months it was overthrown by the South Korean Army in the May 16 coup led by Park Chung Hee. The Second Republic was replaced by a provisional military government under the Supreme Council for National Reconstruction, leading to the Third Republic of Korea.

The short-lived Second Republic was the only parliamentary government in the history of South Korea.

== Establishment ==
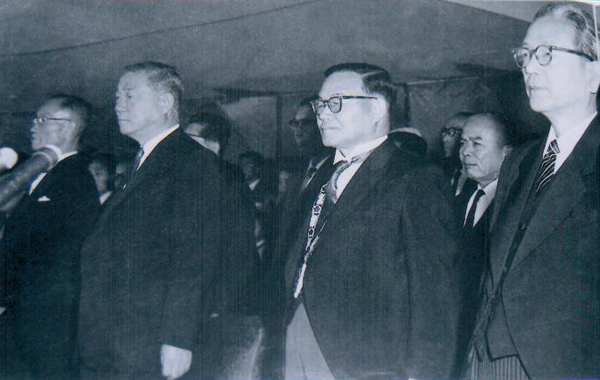
Proclamation of the Second Republic of Korea. From right: Chang Myon (Prime Minister), Yun Bo-seon (President), Paek Nak-chun (President of the House of Councillors) and Kwak Sang-hoon (President of the Chamber of Deputies)

The First Republic of Korea had existed since 1948 under President Syngman Rhee, who was widely considered to be a corrupt leader abused his presidential powers to maintain his rule and cronyism. Although the First Republic was officially a representative democracy, Rhee adopted a strongly anti-communist position and used the threat of communism to enact a policy (such as the National Security Act) of severe repression against all political opposition, effectively assuming dictatorial powers.

Tolerance of Rhee and his Liberal Party-dominated government declined in the mid-to-late 1950s, as the South Korean public were increasingly discontent with the repression and the limited economic and social development. In April 1960, Rhee was overthrown by widespread protests known as the "April Revolution" in response to the discovery of a high school student murdered by police during demonstrations against Rhee and rigged elections in March.

After Rhee's fall, power was briefly held by a caretaker government headed by Ho Chong as prime minister until a parliamentary election was held on 29 July 1960.

The Second Republic operated under a parliamentary system, with the Prime Minister of South Korea as the head of government and the President of South Korea as the head of state. Due to Rhee's numerous abuses of power, the President's power was greatly reduced, with a role that was largely ceremonial. He was elected by a joint session of the National Assembly, with a two-thirds supermajority required to win. Real political power was vested in the Prime Minister, who was nominally elected by the House of Representatives but in practice was the leader of the majority party or coalition in the lower chamber. The Second Republic was the first and only instance of the South Korean government using a parliamentary system instead of a presidential or semi-presidential system.

The Democratic Party, which had been in the opposition during the First Republic, easily gained power; Rhee's former opponent Chang Myon became prime minister. The new legislature was bicameral, with the House of Representatives as the lower house and the House of Councillors as the upper house. Yun Posun was elected as the second President of South Korea on 13 August 1960.

== Politics ==
=== Freedom ===
The Second Republic repealed the severe curbs on political expression that had been in place under the Rhee regime, and as a result, freedom returned and an increase in political activity. Much of this activity was from leftist and student groups, which had been instrumental in the overthrow of the First Republic. Membership of unions and activity grew rapidly during the later months of 1960. Estimates suggest around 2,000 demonstrations were held during eight months of the Second Republic.

Under pressure from the left-wing, the Chang government carried out a series of purges of military and police officials who had been involved in anti-democratic activities or corruption during the First Republic. A special law to this effect was passed on 31 October 1960. Around 40,000 people were placed under investigation; of these, more than 2,200 government officials and 4,000 police officers were purged. In addition, the government considered reducing the size of the South Korean Army by 100,000, although this plan was shelved.

=== Economy ===
The Second Republic government was faced with mounting instability in economic terms as well, seeing unemployment and wholesale prices rise. The won lost half of its value against the US dollar between fall 1960 and spring 1961. The government formulated a five-year economic plan based around agriculture and light industry to decrease unemployment, but was ultimately overthrown before having the chance to carry it out.

=== Foreign relations ===
Chang's government resumed negotiations for the normalization of Japan–Korea diplomatic relations, which had not progressed under the Rhee regime that had existed since the end of Japanese rule. The Second Republic established diplomatic relations with many newly established countries, with Sohn Won-yil, the first ambassador to West Germany, attending the independence ceremonies of Cameroon, Togo, Guinea, Mali, Nigeria, and Morocco.

== Dissolution ==
The Second Republic suffered from numerous political, economic, and social issues that were both new and inherited from the First Republic. Failure to properly address the issues caused a growth in political instability as factional fighting within the Democratic Party, combined with the increasing activity from opposition and activist groups, led to a breakdown in South Korean politics.

=== May 16 coup ===
Many high-ranking figures of the South Korean military held animosity for so-called "liberation aristocrats" – the ruling class of conservative politicians involved in the Korean independence movement and United States Army Military Government – that they blamed for the stalling of development in South Korea. Military figures noted how South Korea had been intensively developed under the Japanese colonial system and the "economic miracle" occurring in Japan, in marked contrast to Rhee's presidency which saw little significant effort to develop the economy, which remained stagnant, poor and largely agrarian. The lack of development under Rhee provoked a growing nationalistic intellectual reaction which called for a radical restructuring of society and a thorough political and economic reorganization, rejecting the model being pursued by the governing elite.

Park Chung Hee, a Major General in the Republic of Korea Army with decidedly ambiguous political leanings, was heavily influenced by this unfolding intellectual reaction. Park became the leader of a reformist and discontented faction within the military that plotted a coup d'etat against the civilian government of the Second Republic on 12 May 1961. The plot was aborted after being leaked, however, the military attempted another coup four days later on 16 May which was successful, dissolving the Second Republic. They proceeded to broadcast a proclamation outlining the policy objectives of the coup, including anti-communism, strengthening of ties with the United States, the elimination of political corruption, the construction of an autonomous national economy which during that time was heavily depended on aid from the United States, Korean reunification, and the removal of the present generation of politicians. Park and his supporters subsequently established the Military Revolutionary Committee as a military junta government, later renamed the Supreme Council for National Reconstruction. Park became the de facto dictator of South Korea as the Chairman of the council, while Yun Bo-seon remained president as a figurehead.
