= Supreme Council for National Reconstruction =

1961–1963 ruling military junta of South Korea

- 1961–1963
- Flag Emblem
- Anthem: 애국가 "Aegukga"
- National seal

- Capital: Seoul
- Common languages: Korean
- Government: Unitary parliamentary republic under an authoritarian (Note: Has been described as totalitarian or authoritarian by multiple sources.) military dictatorship
- President
  - 1961–1962: Yun Po-sun
  - 1962–1963: Park Chung Hee (acting)
- Prime Minister
  - 1961: Chang Myon
  - 1961: Jang Do-young
  - 1961–1962: Song Yo-chan
  - 1962: Park Chung-hee
  - 1962–1963: Kim Hyun-chul
- Chairman of the Supreme Council
  - 1961: Chang Do-yong
  - 1961–1963: Park Chung Hee
- Legislature: None (rule by decree)
- Historical era: Cold War
  - May 16th coup: 16 May 1961
  - Establishment of the Third Republic: 17 December 1963
- Currency: Hwan (until 1962); Won (from 1962)
Preceded by	Succeeded by
Second Republic of Korea	Third Republic of Korea
- Today part of: South Korea

Korean name
- Hangul: 국가재건최고회의
- Hanja: 國家再建最高會議
- RR: Gukga jaegeon choego hoeui
- MR: Kukka chaegŏn ch'oego hoeŭi

The Supreme Council for National Reconstruction (Korean: 국가재건최고회의) was the ruling military junta of South Korea from May 1961 to December 1963.

The Supreme Council overthrew the Second Republic of Korea in the May 16 coup in May 1961 and established a provisional military government composing largely of officers who were involved in or supportive of the coup. The Supreme Council was headed by the chairman, the de facto head of government with dictatorial powers, while President Yun Posun was retained as a figurehead. The Supreme Council prioritized South Korea's economic development and political stability, suspending the National Assembly and most political freedoms, and founding the Korean Central Intelligence Agency to combat pro-North Korean and other anti-government activity. Park Chung Hee served as Chairman of the Supreme Council from July 1961 until his victory in the 1963 South Korean presidential election, and the Supreme Council was dissolved upon the inauguration of the Third Republic of Korea in December 1963.

== History ==
=== Background ===
The First Republic of Korea was established on 15 August 1948 following the transfer of power from the United States Army Military Government in Korea (USAMGIK) to the Government of South Korea, becoming the first independent government of South Korea. The First Republic had a highly-centralized government under President Syngman Rhee, who maintained autocratic power as the President of South Korea, and was widely viewed as authoritarian and corrupt. Rhee's government was characterized by widespread cronyism, intimidation and indifference to South Korea's economic development. Until the late 1950s, Rhee's unpopularity and corruption was largely tolerated by the South Korea public for the sake of political unity, and as a staunch anti-communist, had crushed open opposition to his regime using the threat of communism as an excuse. In April 1960, Rhee was eventually overthrown in mass protests known as the April Revolution, started in response to the murder of a student killed by police during earlier protests against election rigging. Rhee's former political opponents in the Democratic Party established the Second Republic of Korea, with a new parliamentary system of government, and dominated the National Assembly following elections. The Second Republic was led by Chang Myon as Prime Minister of South Korea, a position which held most of the power, and was headed by Yun Bo-seon as president, now a largely ceremonial role. The new government attempted to fix the issues left behind by Rhee, but proved to be ineffective, and caused the political instability of the First Republic to continue.

=== May 16 coup ===
Many high-ranking figures of the South Korean military held animosity for so-called "liberation aristocrats" – the ruling class of conservative politicians involved in the Korean independence movement and the USAMGIK – that they blamed for the stalling of development in South Korea. Military figures noted how South Korea had been intensively developed under the Japanese colonial system and the "economic miracle" occurring in Japan, in marked contrast to Rhee's presidency which saw little significant effort to develop the economy, which remained stagnant, poor and largely agrarian. The lack of development under Rhee provoked a growing nationalistic intellectual reaction which called for a radical restructuring of society and a thorough political and economic reorganization, rejecting the model being pursued by the governing elite.

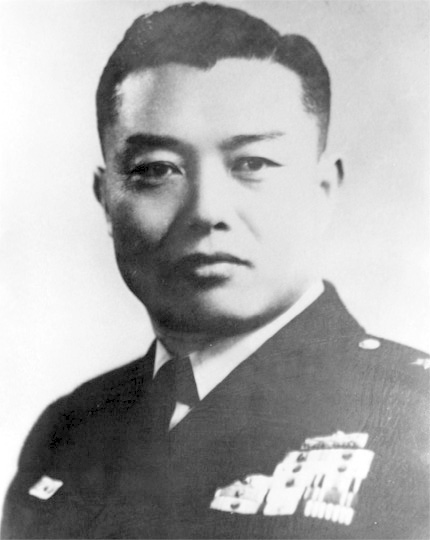
General Chang Do-yong served as the first Chairman of the Supreme Council from May to July 1961.

Park Chung Hee, a Major General in the Republic of Korea Army with decidedly ambiguous political leanings, was heavily influenced by this unfolding intellectual reaction. Park became the leader of a reformist faction within the military that plotted a coup d'etat against the civilian government of the Second Republic on 12 May 1961. The plot was aborted after being leaked, however, the military attempted another coup four days later on 16 May which was successful, dissolving the Second Republic. They proceeded to broadcast a proclamation outlining the policy objectives of the coup, including anti-communism, strengthening of ties with the United States, the elimination of political corruption, the construction of an autonomous national economy, Korean reunification, and the removal of the present generation of politicians. Park and his supporters subsequently established the Military Revolutionary Committee as a military junta government, later renamed the Supreme Council for National Reconstruction. President Yun Posun, who had sided with the coup, was retained in his position as a theoretic figurehead. General Chang Do-yong, then Army Chiefs of Staff, was installed as the Chairman of the Supreme Council, while Park became the vice-chairman. However, the power struggles within the Supreme Council allowed Park to engineer the gradual transfer of power from Chang to himself. In July, Park officially replaced Chang as chairman, effectively becoming the de facto dictator of Korea.

=== Dissolution ===
By 1962, Park and the Supreme Council were coming under increasing pressure by the United States administration of President John F. Kennedy to return to civilian rule, as military leaders had promised to return the government to a democratic system as soon as possible. On December 2, 1962, a referendum was held on returning to a presidential system of rule, which was allegedly passed with a 78% majority. In response, Park eventually resigned from his military position to be eligible to run as a civilian in the upcoming presidential election, despite the fact that he and the other military leaders had pledged not to run for office. Park narrowly won in the presidential election of October 1963, and replaced Yun Posun as the President of Korea. The Supreme Council was officially dissolved upon the inauguration of the Third Republic of Korea on 17 December 1963, ending the three-year constitutional vacuum.

== Economy ==
The Supreme Council prioritized the economic development of South Korea and was the first South Korean government to introduce economic planning, with the first South Korean five-year plan inaugurated in 1962. Although the Second Republic had laid the groundwork for such economic plans, it had not been able to put them into practice due to the May 16 coup. The Ministry of Foreign Affairs and Trade enacted policies to encourage and promote export. Currency reform reduced the exchange rate of the South Korean won to US dollar, mainly to prevent money laundering by fraudsters who hid large amounts of money and to weaken the economic influence of Overseas Chinese investors on the South Korean economy.

In late 1963, the Supreme Council began the program with the government of West Germany to recruit South Korean nurses and miners as Gastarbeiter. The costs of the nurses and miners sent to West Germany were largely paid for by the South Korean government, with only their wages and some language services paid for by their employers in West Germany. The Gastarbeiter South Koreans have since been argued as a major cause of South Korea's rapid economic growth in the late 20th century.

== Diplomacy ==
South Korea–United States relations were damaged by Park's coup and his military administration was met with instant disapproval from the United States. Park himself had suffered from suspicions of being a communist both at home and abroad due to his political history. Park had previously been sentenced to death in November 1948 after being arrested on charges that he led a communist cell in the Korean constabulary, but his sentence was commuted by several high-ranking military officers. Park had been a member of the Workers' Party of South Korea, the communist party responsible for the Jeju uprising, and was involved in the left-wing Yeosu-Suncheon Rebellion. Park's left-wing history, combined with his history as a Japanese-trained officer in the Manchukuo Imperial Army, the military of the Japanese puppet state of Manchukuo, led many to question his true intentions despite the Supreme Council's publicly anti-communist stances. Park visited the United States in 1961 and attempted to persuade President Kennedy to approve his regime, but was instead encouraged to quickly restore civilian rule in South Korea.

== See also ==
- History of South Korea
- History of Korea
