= House of Representatives (South Korea) =

1952–1961 lower house of South Korea

Type
- Type: Lower house of the National Assembly of South Korea

History
- Founded: 7 July 1952
- Disbanded: 16 May 1961
- Seats: 210 (1952–1954); 203 (1954–1958); 233 (1958–1961)

Elections
- Voting system: First-past-the-post voting
- First election: 20 May 1954
- Last election: 29 June 1960

Korean name
- Hangul: 민의원
- Hanja: 民議院
- RR: Minuiwon
- MR: Minŭiwŏn

The House of Representatives (Korean: 민의원) was the lower house of the National Assembly of South Korea during its First and Second Republics. The House of Representatives was established by the Constitution of the First Republic of Korea, which established a bicameral legislature. However, as the House of Councillors was never established during the First Republic, the House of Representatives acted as the only house in a unicameral legislature until the House of Councillors was actually established in the Second Republic.

== Speakers ==
Speaker	Political party	Took office	Left office	Legislature
Shin Ik-hee 신익희 申翼熙; Member for Gwangju, Gyeonggi (1892–1956)	Democratic Nationalist	4 August 1948	30 May 1954	2nd National Assembly
Lee Ki-poong 이기붕 李起鵬; Member for Seodaemun B, Seoul (until 1958); Icheon, Gyeonggi (from 1958) (1896–1960)	Liberal	9 June 1954	28 April 1960	3rd National Assembly
Lee Ki-poong 이기붕 李起鵬; Member for Seodaemun B, Seoul (until 1958); Icheon, Gyeonggi (from 1958) (1896–1960)	Liberal	9 June 1954	28 April 1960	4th National Assembly
Kwak Sang-hoon 곽상훈 郭尙勳; Member for Incheon B, Gyeonggi (1896–1980)	Democratic	2 May 1960	16 May 1961	4th National Assembly
Kwak Sang-hoon 곽상훈 郭尙勳; Member for Incheon B, Gyeonggi (1896–1980)	Democratic	2 May 1960	16 May 1961	5th National Assembly

== Deputy speakers ==
Deputy speaker	Political party	Took office	Left office	Legislature
Yun Chi-young 윤치영 尹致暎; Member for Gongju B, South Chungcheong (1898–1996)	Nationalist	10 July 1952	30 May 1954	2nd National Assembly
Cho Bong-am 조봉암 曺奉岩; Member for Incheon C, Gyeonggi (1899–1959)	Nationalist	10 July 1952	30 May 1954	2nd National Assembly
Choe Sun-ju 최순주 崔淳周; Member for Yeongdong, North Chungcheong (1902–1956)	Liberal	9 June 1954	2 December 1954	3rd National Assembly
Kwak Sang-hoon 곽상훈 郭尙勳; Member for Incheon B, Gyeonggi (1896–1980)	Independent	9 June 1954	8 June 1956	3rd National Assembly
Jo Gyeong-gyu 조경규 趙瓊奎; Member for Haman, South Gyeongsang (1904–1983)	Liberal	2 March 1955	30 May 1958	3rd National Assembly
Hwang Seong-su 황성수 黃聖秀; Member for Yongsan B, Seoul (1917–1997)	Liberal	9 June 1956	27 November 1956	3rd National Assembly
Lee Jae-hak 이재학 李在鶴; Member for Hongcheon, Gyeonggi (1904–1973)	Liberal	5 December 1956	30 May 1958	3rd National Assembly
Han Hui-seok 한희석; Member for Cheonan, South Chungcheong	Liberal	7 June 1958	2 September 1959	4th National Assembly
Lee Jae-hak 이재학 李在鶴; Member for Hongcheon, Gyeonggi (1904–1973)	Liberal	7 June 1958	26 May 1960	4th National Assembly
Lim Cheol-ho 임철호 任哲鎬; Member for Buyeo B, South Chungcheong (1905–1990)	Liberal	4 October 1959	26 May 1960	4th National Assembly
Kim Do-yeon 김도연 金度演; Member for Seodaemun A, Seoul (1894–1967)	Democratic	10 June 1960	28 July 1960	4th National Assembly
Lee Jae-hyeong 이재형 李載灐; Member for Siheung, Gyeonggi (1905–1990)	Liberal	10 June 1960	28 July 1960	4th National Assembly
Lee Yeong-jun 이영준 李榮俊; Member for Dongdaemun A, Seoul (1896–1968)	Democratic	8 August 1960	16 May 1951	5th National Assembly
Na Yong-gyun 나용균 羅容均; Member for Jeongeup A, North Jeolla (1896–1984)	Democratic	8 August 1960	16 May 1951	5th National Assembly

== See also ==
- National Assembly
- House of Councillors
