= Democratic Party (South Korea, 1955) =

1955–1963 political party in South Korea

- Abbreviation: DP
- Founded: 18 September 1955
- Dissolved: 1964
- Preceded by: Democratic Nationalist Party
- Merged into: People's Party
- Ideology: Democracy; Conservatism; Anti–left-wing
- Colors: Blue

Party flag

- Democratic Party
- Hangul: 민주당
- Hanja: 民主黨
- RR: Minjudang
- MR: Minjudang

The Democratic Party (DP; Korean: 민주당) was a political party in South Korea. The party was the first truly organized liberal opposition against Syngman Rhee's conservative Liberal Party, and is considered as the predecessor to the lineage of the South Korean liberal parties.

== History ==
The Democratic Party was established on 18 September 1955. It had its background in a 1952 move by the Democratic Nationalist Party to create a pro-reform movement that included both party members and outside figures. Although not initially successful in overcoming the party's poor public image, controversy over a constitutional amendment vote towards the end of 1954 led to the formation of a 60-member bloc in Parliament that became the Democratic Party. Several prominent conservatives joined the party, resulting in the party refusing to admit left-wing politicians.

The party did not nominate a presidential candidate in the 1956 elections, but put forward Chang Myon as its vice-presidential candidate. Chang was elected with 46.4% of the vote. Public attitude turning against the rule of Syngman Rhee and the Liberal Party led to increased tensions, and Chang survived an assassination attempt in 1957.

In the 1958 parliamentary elections the DP received 34% of the vote, winning 79 seats and finishing second to the ruling Liberal Party. The party nominated Chough Pyung-ok as its candidate for the March 1960 presidential elections. However, he died shortly before the elections, leaving Rhee as the sole candidate. Chang was defeated by Liberal candidate Lee Ki-poong in the vice-presidential elections. However, student protests over the results led to Rhee going into exile before the June parliamentary elections, in which the DP won a landslide victory, taking 175 of the 233 seats in the House of Commons and 31 of the 58 seats in the Senate.

Despite gaining power, the party descended into infighting between the new and old factions; a compromise resulted in the new faction's Chang being elected Prime Minister and Yun Posun of the old faction being elected President in an indirect election in August. However, the internal tensions eventually resulted in the old faction breaking away to form a separate party.

However, after less than a year in power, the DP government was overthrown in the May 16 coup and the party ceased activities. However, when democracy was nominally reintroduced in 1963, the party was reconstituted. In the 1963 parliamentary elections it won 13 seats, and the following year merged with the People's Party.

== Election results ==
=== President ===
Election	Candidate	Votes	%	Result
August 1960	Yun Po-sun	208	82.21	Elected

=== Vice President ===
Election	Candidate	Votes	%	Result
1956	Chang Myon	4,012,654	46.43	Elected
March 1960	Chang Myon	1,843,758	17.51	Not elected

=== Legislature ===
==== House of Representatives ====
Election	Leader	Votes	%	Seats				Position	Status
Election	Leader	Votes	%	Constituency	Party list	Total	+/–	Position	Status
1958	Chang Myon	2,914,049	33.99			79 / 233	new	2nd	Opposition
1960	Chang Myon	3,786,304	41.71			175 / 233	▲96	1st	Government
1963	Park Soon-cheon	1,264,285	13.6	8 / 131	5 / 44	13 / 175	▼163	3rd	Opposition

==== House of Councillors ====
Election	Leader	Votes	%	Seats	Position	Status
1960	Chang Myon	5,491,527	51.41	31 / 58	1st	Government
