= April Revolution =

1960 South Korean protests

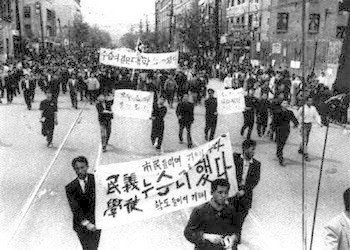
- Protesters during the April Revolution
- Date: April 11–26, 1960
- Location: South Korea
- Caused by: Oppression by Syngman Rhee's government; Electoral fraud
- Result: Song Yo-chan declares martial law; Resignation and exile of Syngman Rhee; Establishment of the Second Republic of Korea on 15 June 1960; Yun Po-sun elected as president

Parties
(South Korea) First Republic of Korea	Pro-democracy protestors

Lead figures
(South Korea) Syngman Rhee (South Korea) Lee Ki-poong † (South Korea) Choi In-Kyu (executed)	(South Korea) Chang Myon (South Korea) Yun Po-sun Lee Jong-chan (born 1916) after April 19th

Casualties and losses
- More than 100 killed

The April Revolution (Korean: 4.19 혁명), also called the April 19 Revolution or April 19 Movement, were mass protests in South Korea against President Syngman Rhee and the First Republic from April 11 to 26, 1960, which led to Rhee's resignation.

Protests opposing Rhee were started by student and labor groups in the southeastern port city of Masan on April 11. The protests were triggered by the discovery of the body of a local high school student killed by police during demonstrations against rigged elections in March. Popular discontent had arisen due to Rhee's autocratic rule, corruption, use of violence against political opposition, and uneven development of South Korea. The Masan discovery led to large student protests in Seoul, which were violently suppressed; a total of 186 people were killed during the two weeks of protest. Rhee resigned on April 26 before fleeing to exile in the United States, and was replaced by Yun Posun, beginning the transition to the Second Republic of South Korea.

== Background ==
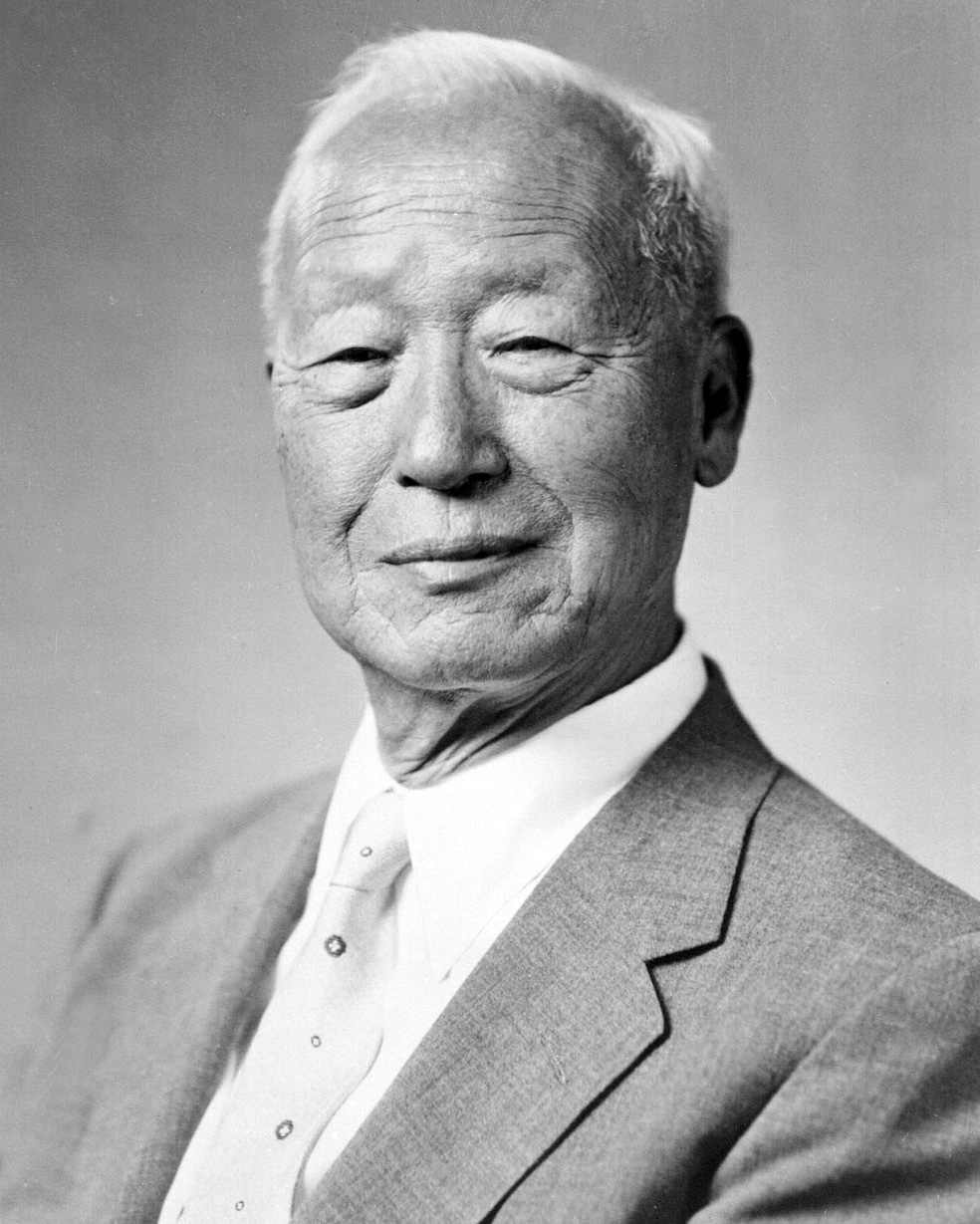
Syngman Rhee had served as the first President of South Korea since July 24, 1948, three weeks before its founding on August 15, 1948.

Syngman Rhee had been the first President of South Korea since the 1948 presidential election. He oversaw the transition of power from the United States Army Military Government to the Government of South Korea and the establishment of the First Republic of Korea, and led South Korea during the Korean War. With American patronage in the Cold War, Rhee adopted a strongly anti-communist and pro-American stance. He used the threat of communism as an excuse to target perceived opposition with heavy-handed repression. At first, this was tolerated in the name of political unity and fear of reprisals. Rhee faced increasing domestic discontent following the end of the Korean War in 1953, however, as his administration delivered limited economic and social development, while angering the public by amending the constitution to prolong his stay in power. The South Korean public widely perceived Rhee as a corrupt and authoritarian leader who used autocratic methods to maintain his rule and cronyism in the government.

In December 1958, Rhee forced through the National Assembly an amendment to the National Security Law giving the government broad new powers to curtail freedom of the press and prevent members of the opposition from voting.

In 1959, Rhee was shocked and threatened when the United States reduced its economic aid to South Korea from a high of $382,893,000 in 1957 to $222,204,000, and began taking desperate measures to ensure his political survival.

The March 1960 presidential election saw two main parties running against Rhee. These were the small Progressive Party (which had received one million votes in the 1956 presidential election) represented by Cho Bong-am, and the Democratic Party represented by Cho Pyong-ok. In July 1959, Rhee accused Cho Bong-am of being a communist, and the Progressive Party leader was subsequently imprisoned and swiftly executed. Cho Pyong-ok went to the United States for a stomach operation at the Walter Reed Army Medical Center but died there of a heart attack. The two deaths were widely perceived by the public as too much of a coincidence.

Rhee was determined to see his protege Lee Ki-poong elected as the Vice President, a post chosen in a separate election on the same day. Lee ran against the Democratic Party candidate Chang Myon, who had been South Korea's ambassador to the United States during the Korean War. On March 15, the mostly bedridden Lee won the vice-presidential election with an abnormally wide margin, winning 8,225,000 votes while Myon received just 1,850,000 votes, and it became clear to the people that the vote was fraudulent. According to the Korean Report, Democratic rallies were prohibited throughout the nation and hundreds of pre-marked ballots were stuffed into boxes on election day.

== Masan protests and the death of Kim Ju-Yul ==
On March 15, the same day as the election results, members of the Democratic Party in the southern city of Masan launched a protest against the electoral corruption. About one thousand residents of Masan gathered in front of the Democratic Party's Masan headquarters at around 7:30 PM. Residents encountered a police presence and the city lights were blacked out. The police began shooting at protesters, who responded by throwing rocks at the police. Nearby, Masan Commercial High School students peacefully demonstrated for South Koreans to be represented, after news of election corruption.

On April 11, a fisherman in the harbor at Masan discovered the corpse of Kim Ju-yul, a student at Masan Commercial High School who disappeared during March 15 rioting. Authorities announced that an autopsy confirmed that the cause of Kim's death was drowning, but many rejected this explanation and some protesters forced their way into the hospital where his body was kept. They found that Kim's skull had actually been split by a 20 centimeter-long tear-gas grenade, which had penetrated from his eyes to the back of his head. This indicated that the police had shot the tear gas to an angle less than 45 degrees, which could be fatal if shot directly at a person's face. Rhee's regime tried to censor news of this incident. However, the story was reported by the Korean press along with a picture of Kim when his body was first found, and delivered to the world through AP. This incident shocked the nation and became the basis of a national movement against electoral corruption on April 19. Masan erupted into three days of spontaneous mass protests which led to further violent clashes with police. Rhee tried to shift the focus by claiming that communist agents were behind the Masan protests.

== Seoul protests ==
On April 18, the protests spread to the capital, Seoul, where students from Korea University launched a non-violent protest at the National Assembly against police violence and demanded new elections. However, they were attacked by gangs funded by Rhee's supporters as they returned to their campus.

On April 19 (called "Bloody Tuesday"), over 100,000 high school and university students marched to the Blue House calling for Rhee's resignation. Police opened fire, killing approximately 180 and wounding thousands. The Rhee government proclaimed martial law in order to suppress the demonstrations.

On April 25, professors joined students and citizens in large-scale protests outnumbering soldiers and police, who refused to attack the protestors.

=== Resignation of Syngman Rhee ===
Song Yo-chan, as then Chief of Staff of the Republic of Korea Army declared martial law and demanded the resignation of Rhee. Song refused to quell student-led protesters even though the police asked for bullets and troops. On April 26, 1960, Rhee stepped down from power, and Lee Ki-poong was blamed for most of the corruption in the government. The following day, the Minister of Interior Choi In-Kyu and the Chief of Security resigned taking responsibility for the Masan incident. On April 28, 1960, in an annex of Rhee's mansion, Lee Ki-poong's first son, Lee Kang-seok (1937 – April 28, 1960) shot Lee Ki-poong and his family and then killed himself in a murder-suicide.

== Aftermath ==
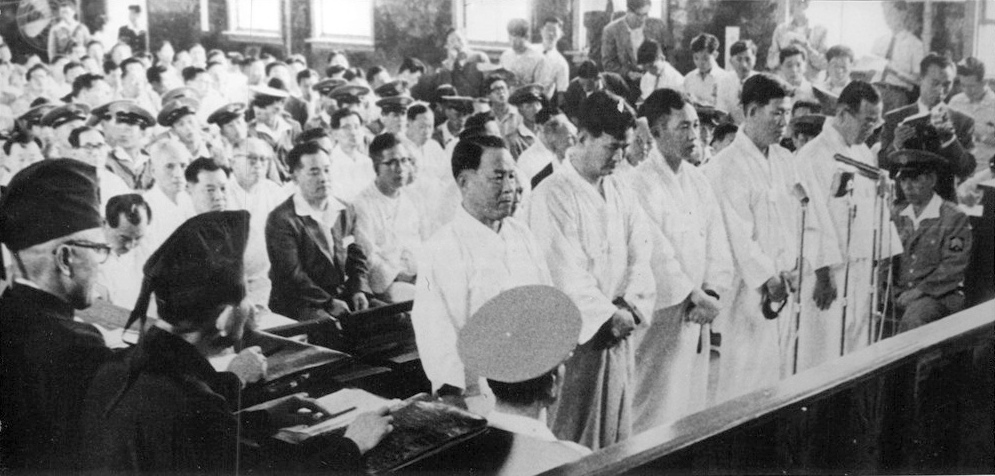
First post-revolution trial began July 5 in South Korea for thirty former high officials of the Rhee regime on charges of corruption, maladministration, and election rigging, etc.

After the resignation of Rhee and the death of Lee Ki-poong, the rule of the Liberal Party government came to an end. Rhee was exiled to Hawaii on May 29, 1960. Originally planning to be a short exile, Rhee was unable to return due to public opposition. The First Republic was replaced by the Second Republic of South Korea, adopting a parliamentary system to remove power from the office of the president. Yun Bo-seon was elected president on August 13, 1960, but real power was vested in the prime minister, Chang Myon.

A National Assembly investigating committee found that the firing into the crowd by the police had not been intended to disperse the crowds, but rather to kill protesters. It was later revealed at a criminal trial that Park Jong-pyo, the Chief of Public Security, tied rocks on Kim Ju-yul's dead body and threw him away into the Masan shore to prevent him floating up on the shore. Park Jong-pyo was later sentenced to life imprisonment for killing Kim. Park Jong-pyo was one of hundreds of people to be sentenced by a revolutionary tribunal on various charges. Multiple death sentences were imposed, with some of them being carried out. Among those executed were the officials responsible for issuing the order to fire. Secretary of the Interior Choi In-Kyu, the official most responsible for the order, and Kwak Yong-ju, the Presidential security chief, who was also involved in the shootings, were both hanged at Seodaemun Prison on December 21, 1961.

On May 16, 1961, following months of political instability, Major-General Park Chung Hee launched a coup d'état overthrowing the short-lived Second Republic of South Korea and replacing it with a military junta and later the autocratic Third Republic of South Korea.

On July 19, 1965, 90-year-old Rhee died at 19:35 Korean time in Honolulu.

Because while confined by police in March 1960, a student leader of Masan Commercial High School, Park Jong Hak had asked the police if they wanted to relay his description of how South Koreans wanted representation by the President, in 2010, President Lee Myung-bak awarded the Order of National Security Merit for distinguished service to national security to Park Jong Hak as the Person of National Merit, among the 23 awarded participants of the March 15, 1960 protest. Kim Ju-yul's mother, Kim Joo-yeol, became another recipient of the award in 2023.

On January 21, 2022 the enactment of The Act on the Restoration of Honor of Participants in the March 15, 1960 peaceful demonstration served to address historical injustices by acknowledging and restoring the honor of the participants. The Truth and Reconciliation Commission recommended the state apologize to the March 15, 1960 demonstrators.

== See also ==
- History of South Korea
- Polish 1970 protests
- 28–29 April events (Turkey)
