= John J. Keane (bishop) =

American Catholic prelate

The Most Reverend John Joseph Keane
- Archbishop Emeritus of Dubuque
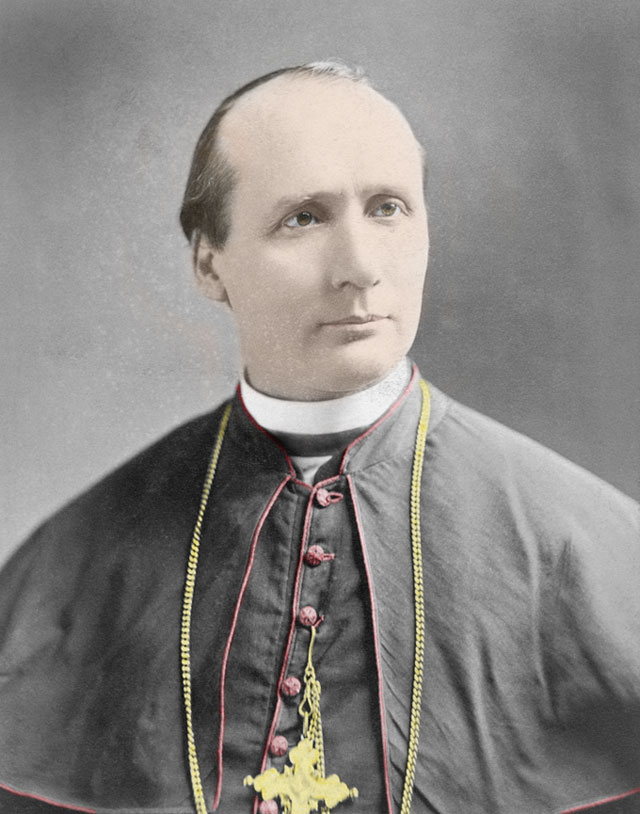
- Church: Catholic Church
- Archdiocese: Dubuque
- Appointed: July 24, 1900
- Retired: April 28, 1911
- Predecessor: John Hennessy
- Successor: James Keane
- Other post: Titular Archbishop of Cius (1911–1918)
- Previous posts: Bishop of Richmond (1878–1887); Rector of the Catholic University of America (1887–1896); Titular Archbishop of Damascus (1897–1900)

Orders
- Ordination: July 2, 1866 by Martin John Spalding
- Consecration: August 25, 1878 by James Gibbons

Personal details
- Born: September 12, 1839 Ballyshannon, County Donegal, Ireland
- Died: June 22, 1918 (aged 78) Dubuque, Iowa, U.S.
- Motto: In Spiritu Et Veritate (Latin for 'In Spirit and In Truth')
- Coat of arms

Ordination history of John J. Keane
History
Episcopal consecration
- Consecrated by: James Card. Gibbons (Baltimore)
- Date: March 28, 1878
Episcopal succession
Bishops consecrated by John J. Keane as principal consecrator
- Mathias Clement Lenihan: September 21, 1904
- James J. Davis: November 30, 1904
- John Patrick Carroll: December 21, 1904

John Joseph Keane (September 12, 1839 – June 22, 1918) was an American prelate of the Catholic Church. He served as Bishop of Richmond in Virginia (1878–1887) and Archbishop of Dubuque in Iowa (1900–1911). He was also the first rector of the Catholic University of America, serving from 1887 to 1896.

== Early life and education ==
A native of Ireland, John Joseph Keane was born on September 12, 1839, in Ballyshannon, County Donegal. He was the eldest son of Hugh Keane, a tailor, and his wife, Fannie Keane (née Connolly). He had two brothers, Terrence and Thomas, and two sisters, who both died in infancy. In 1846, amid the Great Famine, the Keane family immigrated to Saint John in New Brunswick, Canada. They later moved to the United States, settling in Baltimore, Maryland, in 1848.

In Baltimore, the Keanes became parishioners at St. Vincent de Paul Church, where John was confirmed by Archbishop Samuel Eccleston and attended the parochial school run by the Christian Brothers. From 1852 to 1856, he attended Calvert Hall, also run by the Christian Brothers. After his graduation, he worked for a Catholic bookseller and then a dry goods business run by the father of Ida Mary Barry Ryan.

Keane decided to study for the priesthood after reading an article in The Catholic Mirror about Auguste Chapdelaine, a French missionary who had been executed in China in 1856. He later recalled:

"I read about a good French woman whose son had been a priest, who was martyred in China, and every day she prayed to her martyred son, and it struck me at the moment, 'I will go and become a priest.'"

In 1859, he enrolled at St. Charles College, a minor seminary in Ellicott City. There, he completed the regular six-year course in only three years. He then continued his studies at St. Mary's Seminary in Baltimore, earning a baccalaureate in theology summa cum laude.

== Priesthood ==
On July 2, 1866, Keane was ordained to the priesthood by Archbishop Martin John Spalding at the chapel of St. Mary’s Seminary. His first and only assignment as a priest was as an assistant pastor at St. Patrick's Church in Washington, D.C., where he served under Rev. Jacob Ambrose Walter.

Keane, who had been inspired by Rev. Theobald Mathew to not drink alcohol, became a leader in the local and national temperance movement. He delivered many lectures throughout Washington and was instrumental in the formation of the Catholic Total Abstinence Union of America in 1872. He also played a prominent role in establishing the Catholic Young Men's National Union in 1875.

During his time in Washington, Keane befriended Rev. Isaac Hecker, a liberal Catholic theologian and founder of the Paulist Fathers. In 1872, he asked Archbishop James Roosevelt Bayley for permission to join the Paulists but was denied.

== Bishop of Richmond ==
In 1877, Bishop James Gibbons, the Bishop of Richmond in Virginia and Apostolic Vicar of North Carolina, was appointed to the Archdiocese of Baltimore. To succeed him, the bishops of the Ecclesiastical Province of Baltimore submitted to Rome a terna, or shortlist of candidates, that included Keane, Silas Chatard, and Henry P. Northrop. Gibbons favored Keane, whom he believed possessed "a rare combination of head and heart." Thus, on March 26, 1878, Keane was named the fifth Bishop of Richmond, as well as administrator of the North Carolina vicariate. This was one of the first episcopal appointments of Pope Leo XIII, who had been elected on February 20 and crowned on March 3.

Keane received his episcopal consecration on August 25, 1878, from Archbishop Gibbons in St. Peter's Cathedral in Richmond. Serving as co-consecrators were Bishop John Joseph Kain, Keane's classmate at St. Mary's Seminary, and Bishop Thomas Foley, who had been Keane's spiritual adviser in Baltimore.

Keane served as administrator of the North Carolina vicariate until 1882, when Henry Northrop (who was previously considered for Richmond) was named apostolic vicar. In one of his early initiatives as Bishop of Richmond, Keane launched a special ministry for Black Catholics. He began holding services for African-Americans in the basement of St. Peter's Cathedral in 1879, noting that the attendees "seemed greatly pleased with the singing, prayers, and instructions." He recruited Rev. John R. Slattery of the Mill Hill Missionaries to continue this work, and dedicated St. Joseph's Church in Richmond to serve the city's Black Catholics in 1885.

Keane frequently addressed largely Protestant groups to educate them about the Catholic faith and lessen prejudice against the Church. In 1879, he was invited to deliver a prayer at the Virginia House of Delegates, which The Washington Post reported was "the first time in the history of Virginia that a minister of the Catholic faith ever officiated as a chaplain in either house of the state legislature." Among the 785 confirmations he performed that year, 143 were converts to Catholicism.

In Richmond, Keane also continued his temperance advocacy that began in Washington. In 1880, he persuaded several of the city's Catholic liquor sellers to close their businesses on Sundays.

== Catholic University of America ==
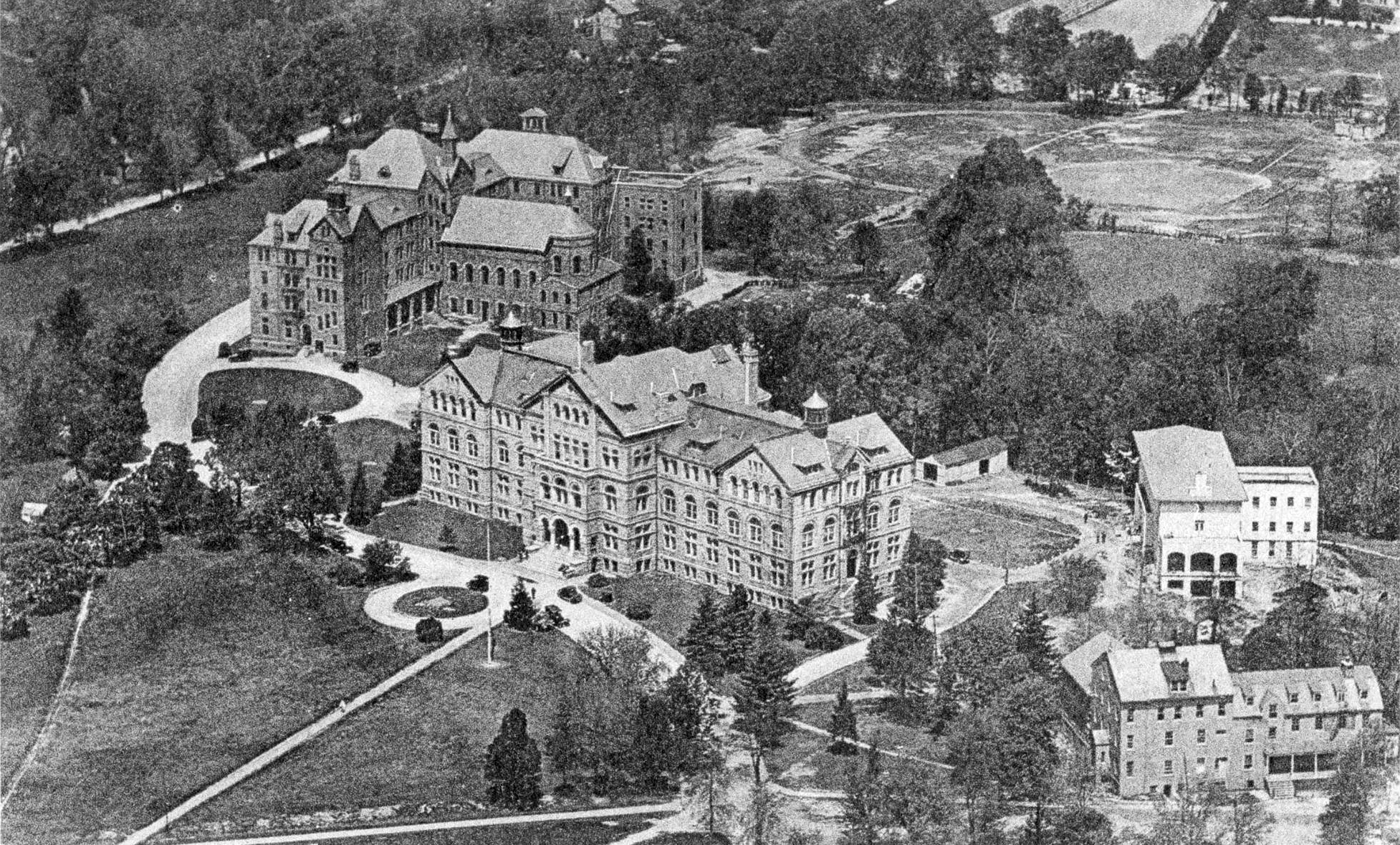
Catholic University of America, Washington, D.C. (1920)

In 1884, Keane attended the Third Plenary Council of Baltimore, where the bishops of the United States authorized the establishment of a Catholic university. On May 12, 1886, the planning committee selected Keane to be the first rector of the institution and sent him to Rome later that year to obtain approval from the pope. On April 10, 1887, Leo XIII approved the creation of the Catholic University of America in Washington, D.C., and the selection of Keane as rector. When the university's board of trustees met on the following September 7, Keane was formally appointed rector.

Keane remained as Bishop of Richmond until August 12, 1888, when he resigned to focus his efforts on the new university. He was then given the honorary title of Titular Bishop of Iasos. Keane recruited professors from across North America and Europe, including Thomas Bouquillon, John Baptist Hogan, Henri Hyvernat, Sebastian Gebhard Messmer, and Edward A. Pace. When the cornerstone of Caldwell Hall, the university's first building, was laid in May 1888, President Grover Cleveland attended. The university opened on November 13, 1889, with 32 students on the first day of classes.

=== Removal ===
During his time as rector, Keane became identified with the liberal wing of American Catholic bishops, which included Cardinal Gibbons and Archbishop John Ireland. They were largely opposed by the conservative wing, led by Archbishop Michael Corrigan and Bishop Bernard John McQuaid, who believed the liberal-leaning bishops were too conciliatory to Protestantism. In 1890, Keane delivered a Dudleian lecture at Harvard University, which had been instituted by Paul Dudley to refute the "damnable heresies" of the Catholic Church. In 1892, Keane's sermon at the funeral of U.S. Senator John S. Barbour Jr., a non-Catholic, prompted an inquiry by Cardinal Mieczysław Halka-Ledóchowski, prefect of the Congregation for the Propagation of the Faith (which then oversaw the affairs of the Church in the United States). Keane also took an active role in the 1893 Parliament of the World's Religions at the World's Columbian Exposition, leading Leo XIII to condemn meetings where "Catholics and dissenters from the Catholic Church assemble to discuss together religion and right morals."

On September 15, 1896, Leo XIII dismissed Keane as rector of the Catholic University of America. In his letter, the pope explained that "they who are appointed to preside over Catholic universities should not hold the office in perpetuity," but it was widely believed the dismissal was due to Keane's liberal views. This came a year after Rev. Denis J. O'Connell was removed as rector of the Pontifical North American College in Rome under similar circumstances; O'Connell would later serve as CUA rector from 1903 to 1909. At the time, The Buffalo Enquirer printed an editorial that described Keane's removal as "a victory for the conservative party in the Catholic Church in America." The conservative Bishop McQuaid also wrote:

"The news from Rome is astounding. The failure of the University is known in Rome at last...What collapses on every side! Gibbons, Ireland, and Keane!!! They were cock of the walk for a while and dictated to the country and thought to run our dioceses for us."

== Rome ==
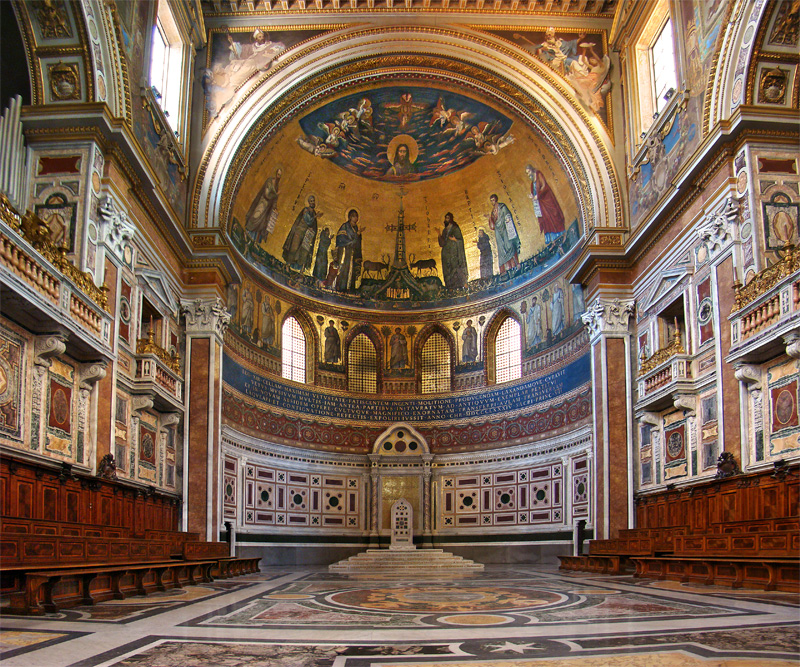
Archbasilica of Saint John Lateran, Rome, Italy (2010)

In his letter removing him from the university, Leo XIII gave Keane the choice of heading an American archdiocese or taking up residence in Rome. Keane initially requested to remain in the United States "without any official position whatsoever." However, shortly afterward, he was persuaded by Archbishop Patrick William Riordan to go to Rome. There, he was made a canon of the Lateran Basilica and a consultor to the Congregation for the Propagation of the Faith. On January 29, 1897, he was also named Titular Archbishop of Damascus.

While Keane was working in Rome, the Americanism controversy became so intense that Leo XIII issued the apostolic letter Testem benevolentiae in 1899, condemning efforts to adapt the Church to Protestant culture. This was partly sparked by the publication of a French translation of a biography of Rev. Isaac Hecker, who had been Keane's longtime friend. Keane himself admitted that he tried to "hinder [the apostolic letter's] publication," and lamented the effect it would have on "the memory of Hecker."

== Archbishop of Dubuque ==
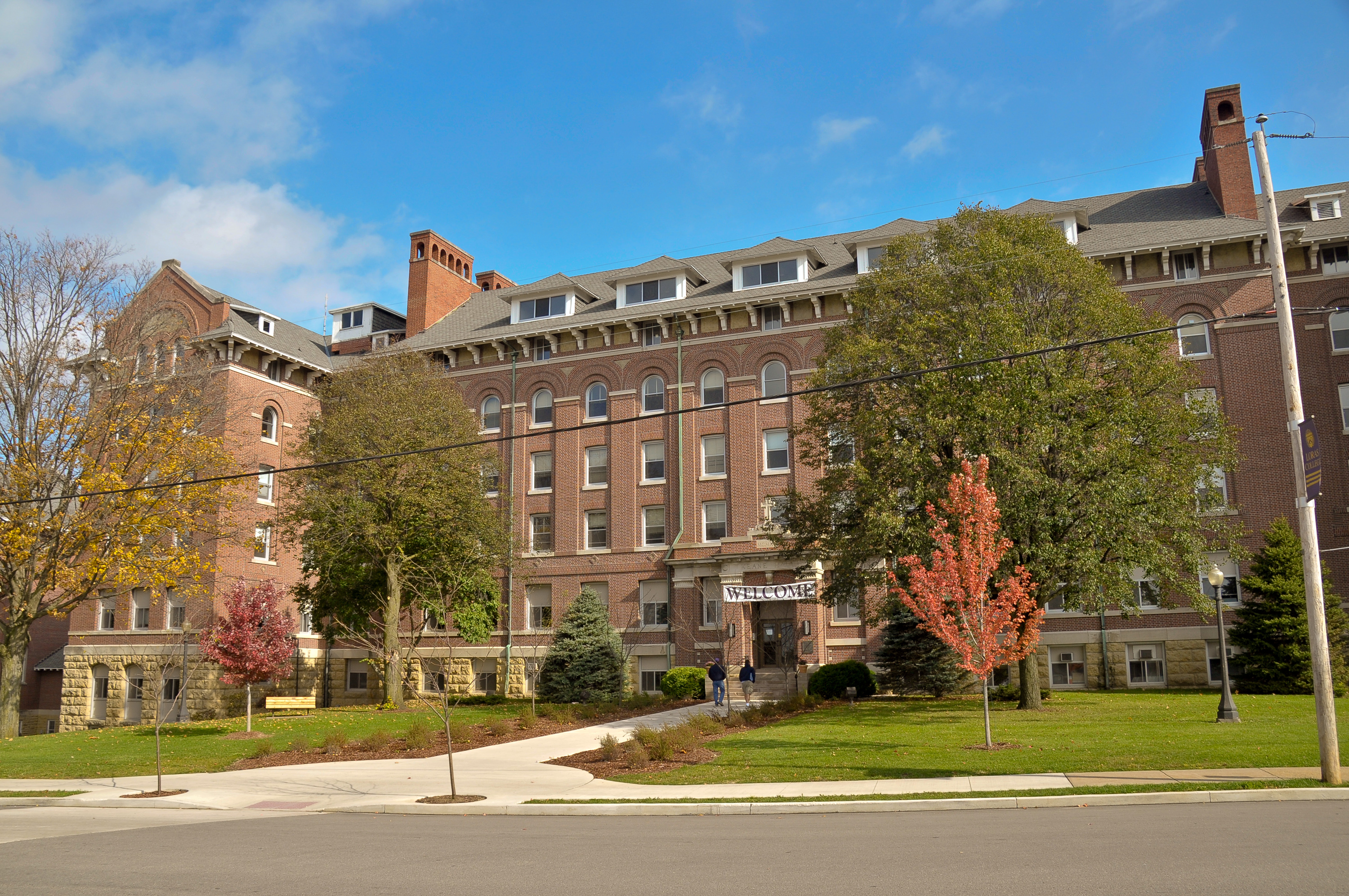
Loras College, Dubuque, Iowa (2008)

John Hennessy, the Archbishop of Dubuque in Iowa, died in March 1900. In their terna, the bishops of the province recommended Keane, Bishop Thomas O'Gorman, or Bishop Lawrence Scanlan to replace the late Hennessy. Cardinal Gibbons wrote to Cardinals Ledóchowski and Mariano Rampolla to endorse Keane's candidacy, reminding them of the pope's earlier offer to appoint Keane to a U.S. archdiocese after dismissing him from the Catholic University. Gibbons's influence prevailed, and Leo XIII named Keane the second Archbishop of Dubuque on July 24, 1900. Upon receiving news of his appointment, Keane wrote, "I must and do say Deo Gratias from the depths of my heart for this solution of my life problem."

Keane was installed at St. Raphael's Cathedral on September 27, 1900, and received the pallium from Cardinal Gibbons on April 17, 1901. In the first full year of Keane's tenure in 1901, the archdiocese contained 273 priests and 259 churches to serve a Catholic population of 150,000. In 1902, the Diocese of Sioux City was created from the western half of the archdiocese and Philip Joseph Garrigan, who had been vice-rector of the Catholic University under Keane, was made its first bishop. In Keane's final year as archbishop in 1911, the archdiocese had 242 priests, 234 churches, and 111,112 Catholics.

As archbishop, Keane devoted particular attention to the development of St. Joseph's College (now Loras College), expanding the number of buildings and requiring all archdiocesan candidates for the priesthood to complete their classical and philosophical studies there. He also continued his promotion of temperance; he established the Archdiocesan Total Abstinence Union in 1902, and secured the Sunday closure of Dubuque saloons in 1907.

== Retirement and death ==
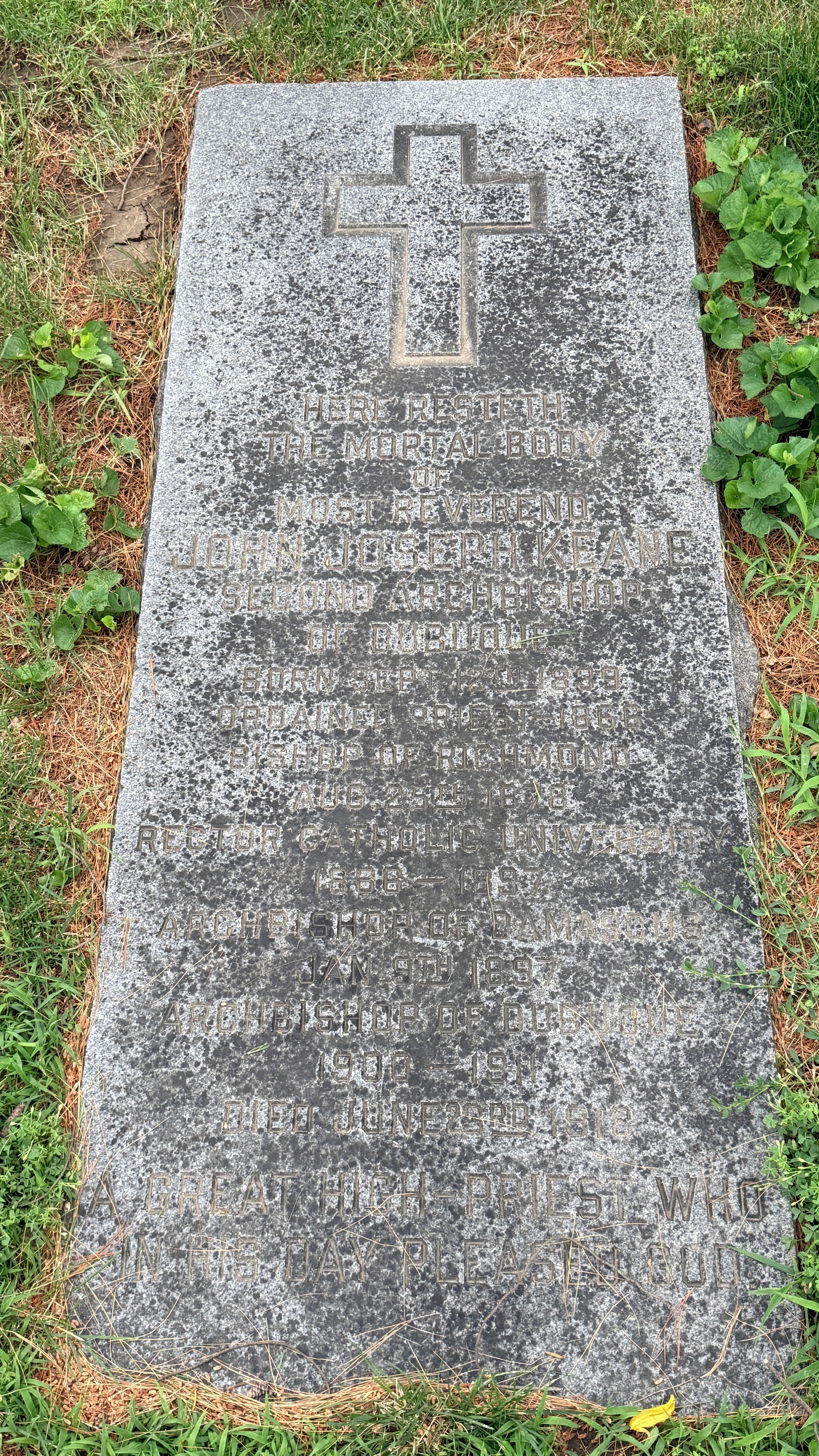
Archbishop Keane’s grave

As his health declined, Keane petitioned Rome for the appointment of a coadjutor or auxiliary bishop to assist him. When his requests were denied, Keane submitted his resignation as Archbishop of Dubuque, which Pope Pius X accepted on April 28, 1911. At that time, the pope gave him the honorary position of Titular Archbishop of Cius.

Keane was succeeded by James J. Keane, who had previously served as Bishop of Cheyenne in Wyoming. The two men were unrelated by blood and personality; John earned the nickname "Sugar Keane" for his gentleness, while James became known as "Hickory Keane" for his sternness. The new archbishop allowed his predecessor to continue living at the cathedral rectory.

Keane died on June 22, 1918, at the age of 78. He was buried at Mount Olivet Cemetery in Key West.

== Sources ==
- Ahern, Patrick Henry (1955). The Life of John J. Keane: Educator and Archbishop, 1839–1918. Milwaukee: Bruce Publishing Company.
- Ahern, Patrick Henry (1948). The Catholic University of America: the Rectorship of John J. Keane. Washington, D.C.: The Catholic University of America Press.

Catholic Church titles
Preceded by James Gibbons	Roman Catholic Bishop of Richmond; 1878–1888	Succeeded by Augustine Van de Vyver
Academic offices
New title Founded	Rector of CUA; 1887–1896	Succeeded by Thomas James Conaty
