= Saint Joseph the Worker Catholic Church (Dubuque, Iowa) =

Church in Iowa, United States

Coordinates: 42.4911°N 90.6926°W

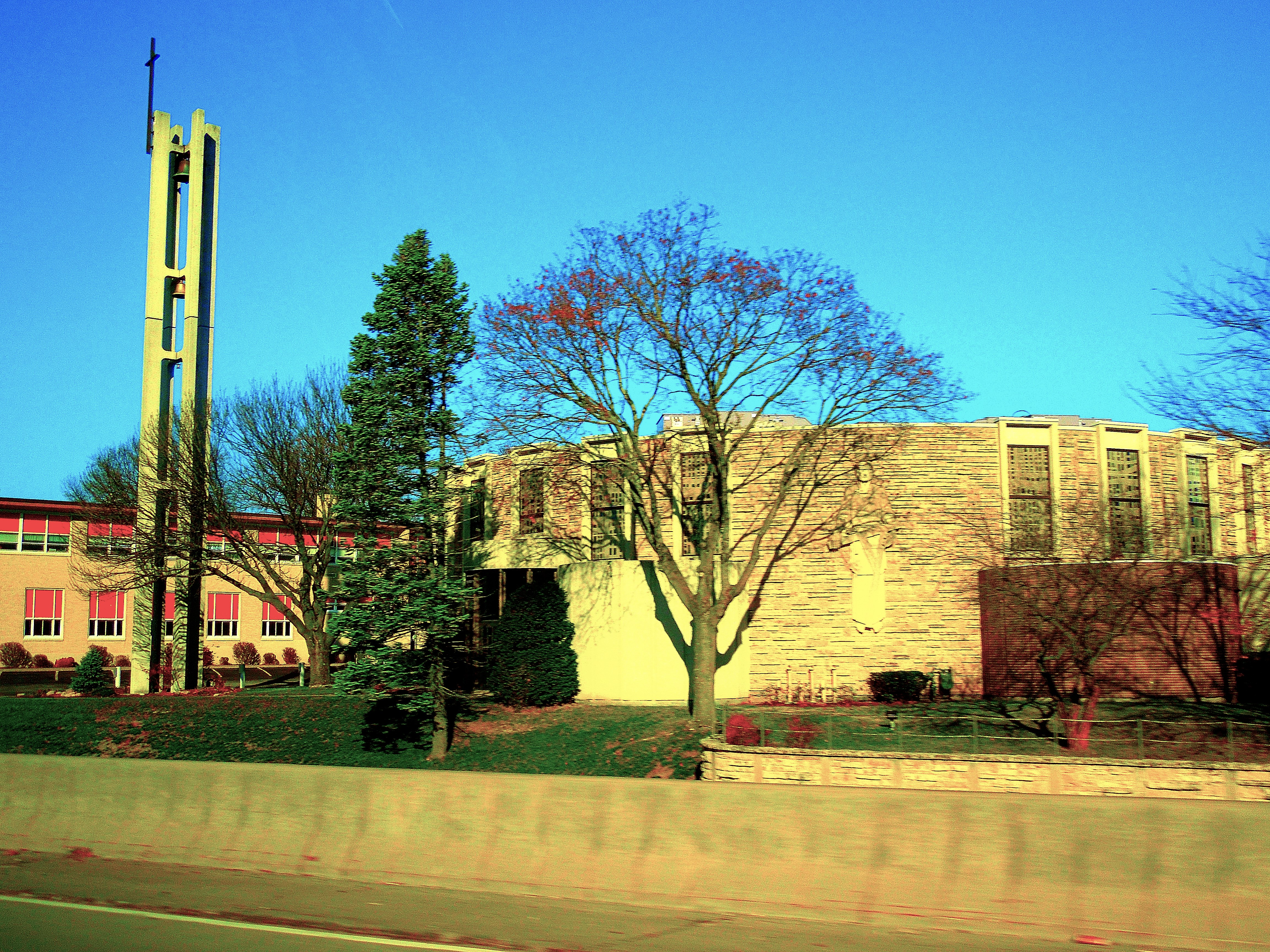
Saint Joseph the Worker Catholic Church

Saint Joseph the Worker Catholic Church is a Catholic parish located in Dubuque, Iowa. It is part of the Archdiocese of Dubuque. The parish became the tenth Catholic parish in Dubuque when it was created in 1949 by Archbishop Rohlman. The current pastor of the parish is Brian M. Dellaert.

== History ==
Prior to the construction of the first church, the parish offices were located at Mercy Hospital. Weekend masses were held at Washington Junior High School. Eventually a parish church was built at the current location at 90 S. Algona, Dubuque.

In 1967, a new parish church was built, in a mid-century modern style. The church was a circular structure where the congregation sat in a semicircle around the altar. The church is noted for its stained glass windows, designed by Robert Leader.

Originally, the parish was named Saint Joseph's Church. There was another Saint Joseph's parish about three miles away, in Key West, Iowa. At times, one of the two parishes would receive mail intended for the other parish. In order to distinguish between the two parishes, the name was changed to St. Joseph the Worker parish in the 1990s. The parish is one of the larger parishes in Dubuque, mainly because of its location near the west end of the city.

The church was vandalized and damaged by arson in 2003. Anti-religious graffiti was found on the walls, as was a number of beer cans. A fire was found to have been burning on the main altar. The church sustained about $100,000 worth of damage. The next day, the pastor removed the Eucharist from the building. The building was then cleaned and repaired by a company that specialized in repairing and cleaning fire damaged buildings. A nearby Methodist church that had moved to a new facility donated their old church building while cleaning and repairs were being done. A young man whose family belonged to the parish had eventually confessed to the crime, he had committed it after a night of drinking and drug use.
