= Hyun Suk-ho =

South Korean politician (1907–1988)

- 현석호
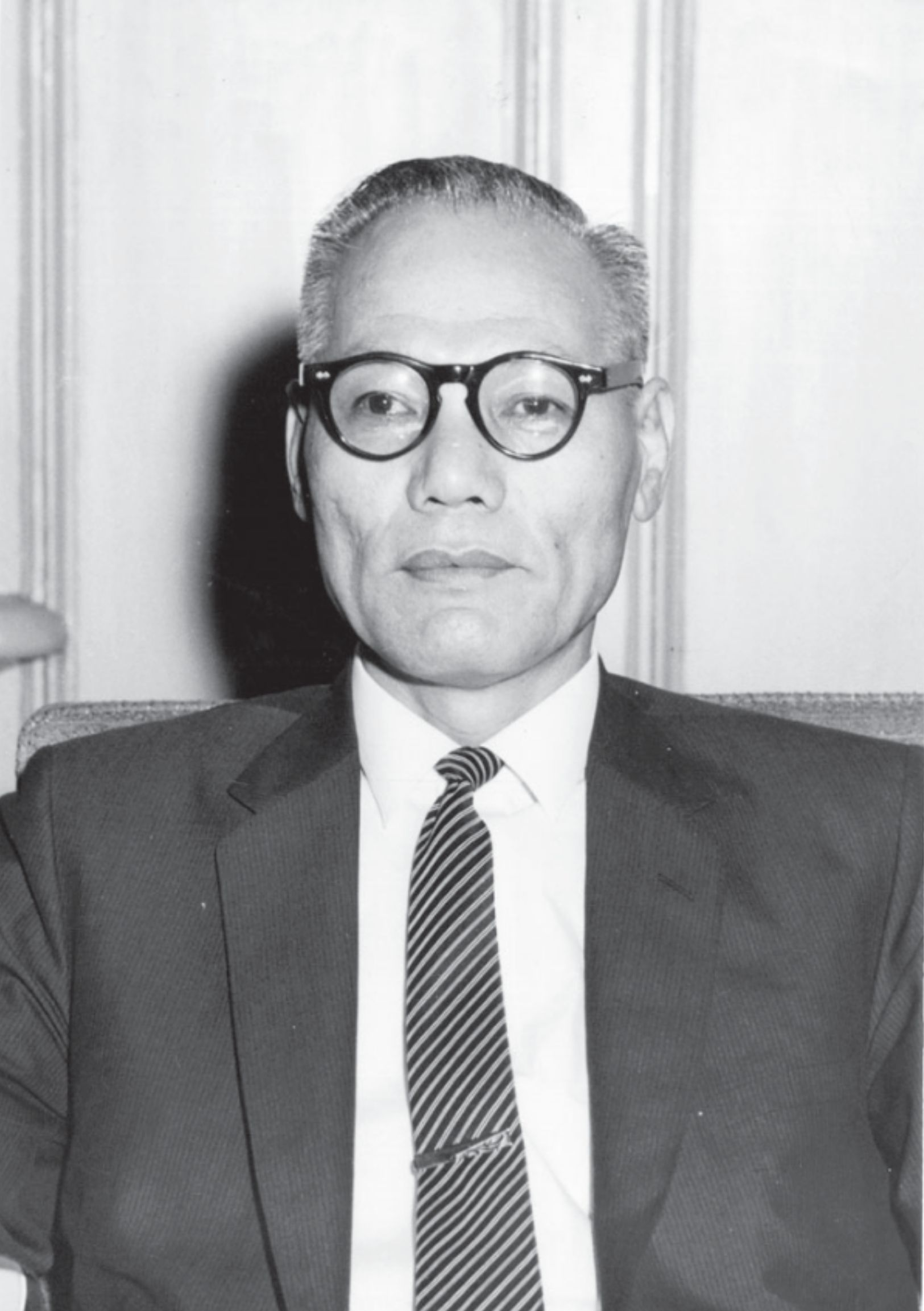

Minister of National Defense
- In office 23 August 1960 – 12 September 1960
- President: Syngman Rhee
- Preceded by: Lee Jong-chan
- Succeeded by: Kwon Joong-don
- In office 30 January 1961 – 18 May 1961
- Preceded by: Kwon Joong-don
- Succeeded by: Chang Do-yong

Minister of Home Affairs
- In office 13 October 1960 – 20 November 1960
- Preceded by: Kim Do-yeon
- Succeeded by: Shin Hyun-don

Personal details
- Born: 23 May 1907 Seoul, Korean Empire
- Died: 2 December 1988 (aged 81) Seoul, South Korea
- Citizenship: South Korean
- Party: Liberal Party; Democratic Party
- Education: Keijo Imperial University

Hyun Suk-ho (Korean: 현석호; May 23, 1907 – December 2, 1988) was a South Korean manager, politician and diplomat. Born in Yecheon-gun, North Gyeongsang Province, he belonged to the Yeonju Hyun clan and used the pen name Sukgye. He served as the 23rd Minister of Home Affairs and as Minister of National Defense of the Republic of Korea.

== Biography ==
He graduated from Daegu Higher Agricultural and Forestry School in North Gyeongsang Province. Later, he moved to Gyeongseong (Seoul) for further studies and earned a bachelor's degree from Keijō Imperial University. After passing the Higher Civil Service Examination (Administrative Division) in 1933, he began his career in the police force. After Korea's liberation, he worked as a business executive—serving as a planning officer for the United States Army Military Government in Korea's Central Economic Committee (1947), Vice President of Namsun Electric (1949), and managing director of Gyeongseong Electric (1951)—before being elected to the National Assembly (3rd term) in 1954 representing the Liberal Party in his hometown of Yecheon County. Later, as a key figure in the "New Faction" of the Democratic Party, he was appointed Director of the Organization Department at the party's central headquarters (1956). He was elected to the National Assembly again (5th term) representing Yecheon County in 1960. During the Second Republic, he was appointed Minister of National Defense, resigning after only 20 days as due to severe infighting between the "New Faction" (led by Chang Myon) and the "Old Faction" (led by President Yun Po-sun) within the Democratic Party, Chang was forced to reshuffle his cabinet almost immediately to appease rival party members. As a result, Hyun stepped down on September 12, 1960, to clear a path for alternative political appointments. He was then appointed for a short period as Minister of Home Affairs and in 1961 he was again appointed Minister of National Defense. He resigned from his second term as Minister of National Defense following the May 16 coup (May 20, 1961). After being imprisoned and subsequently released, he participated in the reconstruction of the Democratic Party (1963). He later became the director of the Catholic Doctrine Research Institute (1967) and spent the remainder of his life studying Catholic doctrine.

In 2002, he was included in the list of 708 pro-Japanese collaborators under the category of Government-General of Korea officials, and in 2008, he was listed in the bureaucracy section of the Biographical Dictionary of Pro-Japanese Collaborators compiled by the Institute for Research in Collaborationist Activities.
