= Kwon Joong-don =

South Korean politician (1912–1983)

- 권중돈
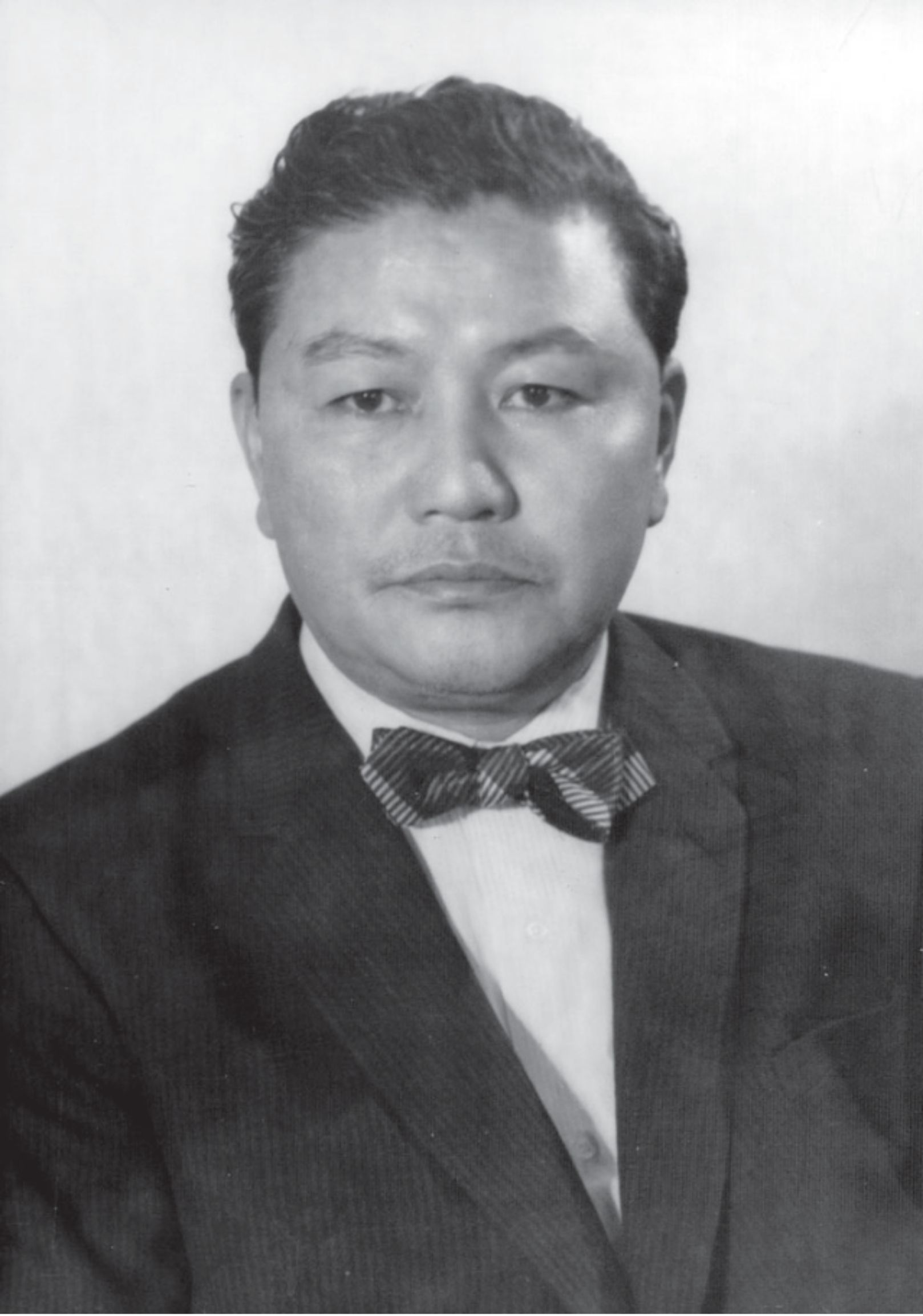

Minister of National Defense
- In office 12 September 1960 – 30 January 1961
- Prime Minister: Chang Myon
- Preceded by: Hyun Suk-ho
- Succeeded by: Hyun Suk-ho

Personal details
- Born: 1912 Yeongcheon, Japanese-controlled Korea
- Died: 1983 (aged 70–71)
- Party: Democratic Party; New Democratic Party (1961); Civil Rule Party; New Democratic Party; Civil Rights Party
- Education: Waseda University

Kwon Joong-don (Korean: 권중돈; Hanja: 權仲敦; 1912–1983) was a South Korean politician. He was a member of the National Assembly in its 2nd, 3rd, 4th, 5th and 8th convocations, and served as Minister of National Defense in the government of Chang Myon.

== Early life ==
Kwon was born in Yeongcheon, North Gyeongsang Province, and graduated from the School of Political Science and Economics at Waseda University in 1940. Before entering the National Assembly he belonged to several political organizations.

== Political career ==
Kwon was first elected to the National Assembly in 1950 and was re-elected in 1954. He sat as an independent and opposed the long rule of the Liberal Party. With his victory in the 1960 election he had been elected four times.

After the Democratic Party came to power, Prime Minister Chang Myon announced a reconstituted cabinet on 12 September 1960 that brought in members of the party's "old" faction, with Kwon as Minister of National Defense. His tenure coincided with a purge movement in the armed forces that unsettled military discipline; he sought to carry out personnel changes and dismissals in a way that balanced the removal of corruption with the preservation of the military hierarchy. He was one of the last civilians to hold the post before the May 16 coup of 1961, after which it was held by former generals for more than six decades.

When the conflict between the "new" and "old" factions split the Democratic Party, Kwon, a senior figure in the old faction, joined the breakaway New Democratic Party and chaired its central standing committee.

After the May 16 coup he returned to opposition politics. He chaired the central committee of the Civil Rule Party in 1964 and its party convention in 1965, became a member of the leadership committee of the New Democratic Party in 1969, and in the 1971 election was elected to the 8th National Assembly for Jongno, Seoul.

Following the assassination of Park Chung Hee in 1979, he was a member of the Legislative Council for National Security of the Fifth Republic. With Kim Ui-taek he then founded the Civil Rights Party and served as its adviser; the party's heavy defeat in the election to the 11th National Assembly effectively ended his political career. He died in 1983.
