= Augustine Van de Vyver =

Belgian-born American prelate

His Excellency, The Right Reverend Augustine Van de Vyver
- Bishop of Richmond
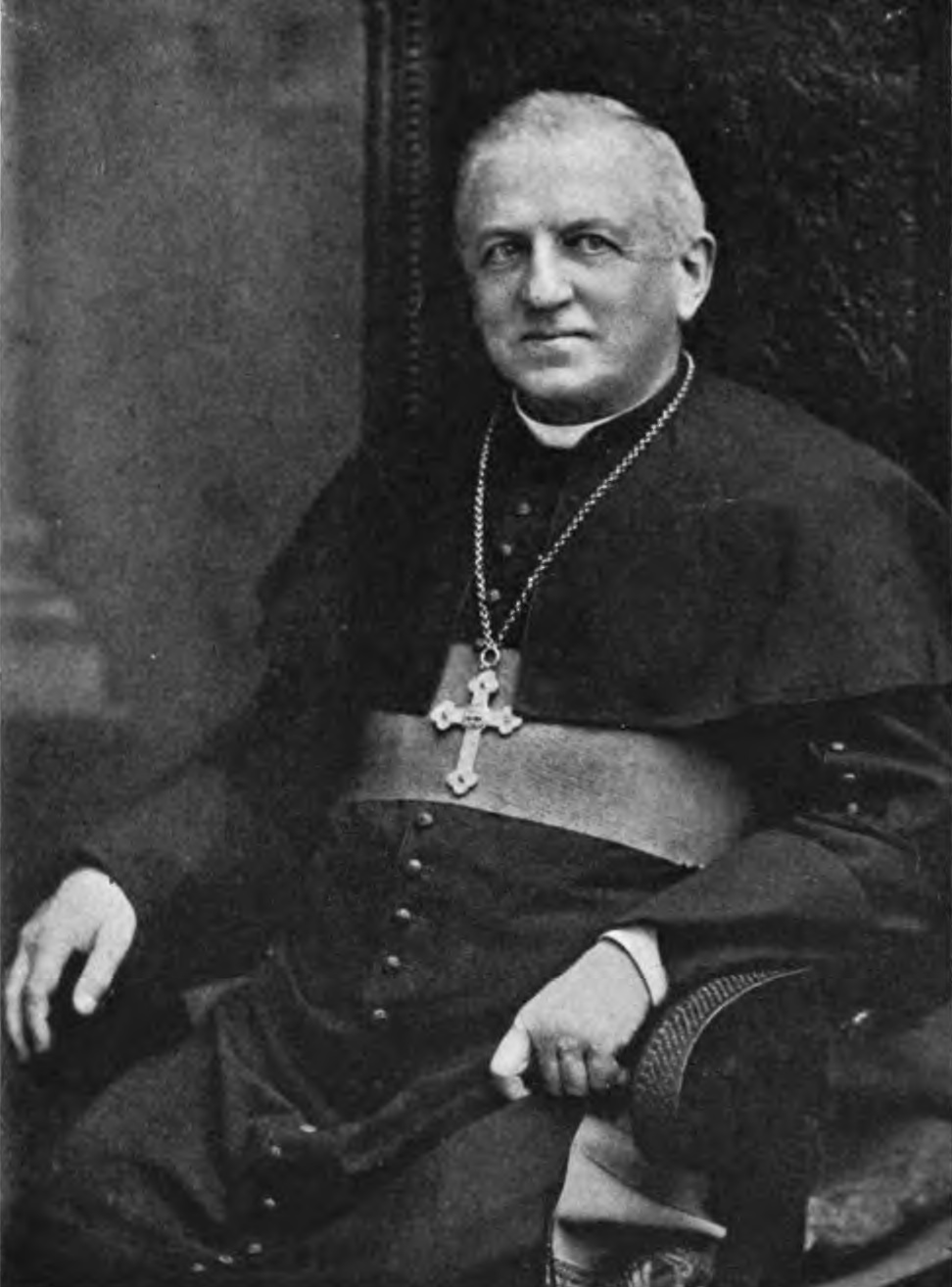
- See: Diocese of Richmond
- In office: October 20, 1889; October 16, 1911
- Predecessor: John Keane
- Successor: Denis J. O'Connell

Orders
- Ordination: July 12, 1870 by Giacomo Cattani
- Consecration: October 20, 1889 by James Gibbons

Personal details
- Born: December 1, 1844 Haasdonk, East Flanders, Belgium
- Died: October 16, 1911 (aged 66) Richmond, Virginia, U.S.
- Education: St. Joseph Minor Seminary; American College of the Immaculate Conception
- Motto: Monstra te esse matrem (Show yourself to be a mother)

Augustine Van de Vyver (December 1, 1844 - October 16, 1911) was a Belgian-born American Catholic prelate who served as the sixth bishop of Richmond in Virginia from 1889 to 1911.

== Biography ==
=== Early life ===
Augustine Van de Vyver was born on December 1, 1844, in Haasdonk, Belgium. His parents were John Ferdinand Van de Vyver and Sophia (De Schepper). He attended the St. Joseph Minor Seminary in Sint-Niklaas, Belgium, then went to the American College, Louvain in Leuven, Belgium, from 1867 to 1870.

=== Priesthood ===
Van de Vyver was ordained into the priesthood in Brussels, Belgium, for the Diocese of Richmond on July 24, 1870, by Archbishop Giacomo Cattani. After arriving in the United States, he was first assigned as an assistant pastor at St. Peter's Cathedral Parish in Richmond, Virginia. In 1875, Van de Vyver was appointed as pastor of Sacred Heart of Jesus parish in Harper's Ferry, West Virginia. While at Sacred Heart, he supervised the completion of a new church in 1878 to replace one destroyed during the American Civil War. In 1881, he returned to Richmond to become pastor of the cathedral parish and vicar-general of the diocese.

=== Bishop of Richmond ===
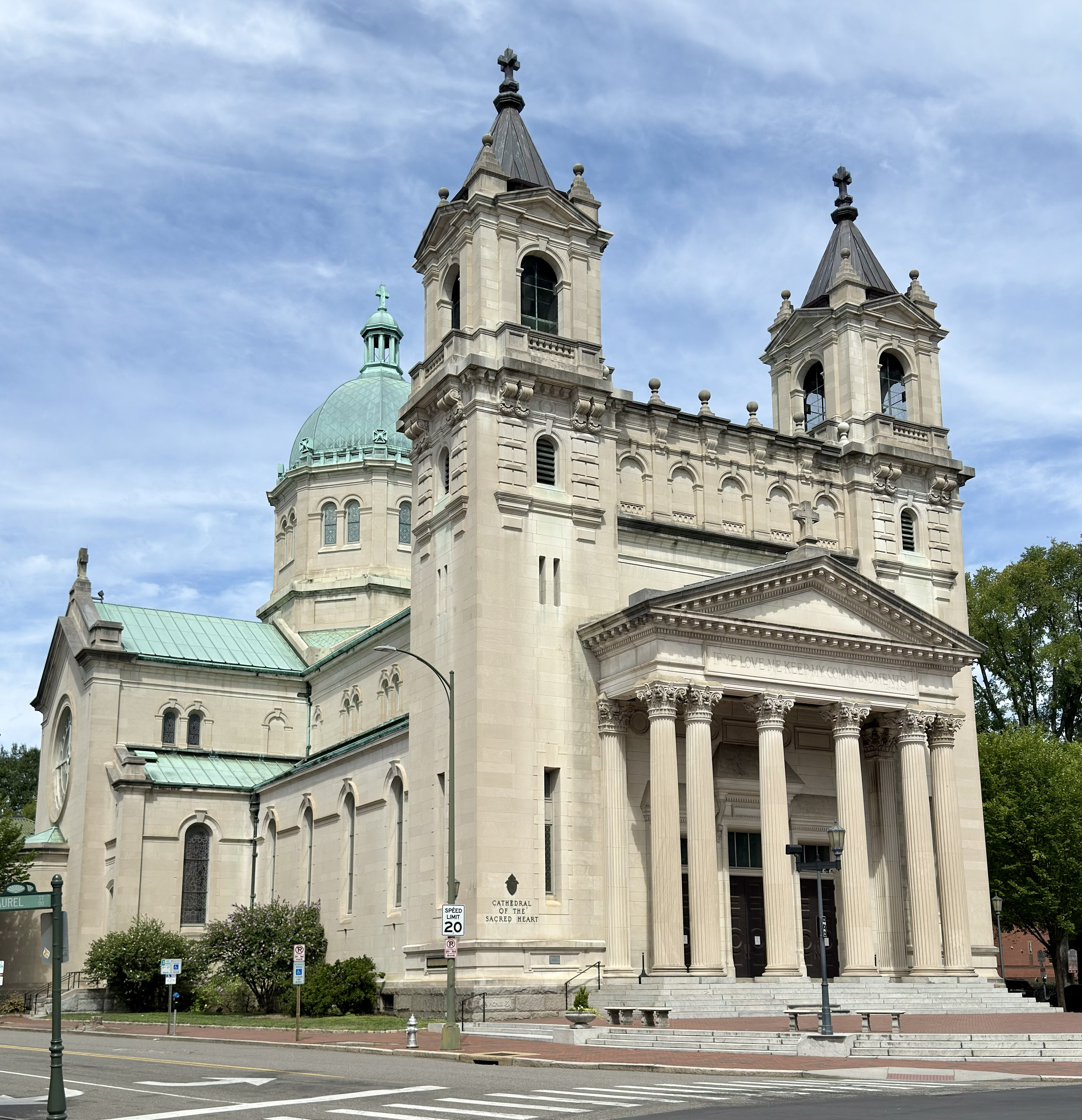
Cathedral of the Sacred Heart, Richmond, Virginia (2025)

Van de Vyver was appointed as bishop of the Diocese of Richmond by Pope Leo XIII on July 16, 1889. According to one account, he was reluctant to accept the appointment, but ultimately obeyed the pope. Van de Vyver was consecrated at St. Peter's Cathedral on October 20, 1889, by Cardinal James Gibbons, with Bishop James Keane serving as co-consecrator.

In 1901, philanthropist Thomas Fortune Ryan and his wife donated almost $500,000 to buy the land and construct a new Sacred Heart Cathedral in Richmond. It was consecrated on November 29, 1906. While bishop, Van de Vyver opened new religious congregations, schools and other Catholic institutions. According to his contemporaries, he was very popular among the priests and the parishioners. With assistance from a donor, Van de Vyver opened an industrial college for African-American boys in Rock Castle, Virginia. Katherine Drexel, mother superior of the Sisters of the Blessed Sacrament. opened a school for African-American girls.

On August 22, 1902, Joseph Anciaux a Belgian Josephite priest in Virginia wrote a letter to the Congregation of the Propaganda in Rome, condemning acceptance by the U.S. Catholic hierarchy of racial segregation in the United States. He called it a radical and non-Catholic policy, and accused Van de Vyver personally of timidity in the face of "negro haters". On October 28, 1902, Van de Vyver forced Anciaux to leave the diocese.

Due to illness, Van de Vyver sent letters of resignation as bishop to the Vatican in 1903 and 1905, but they were denied. He attempted again in 1908, but the clergy and parishioners in the diocese convinced him to withdraw his request.

Family

Van de Vyver was the uncle of Saint-Mary's pastor Reverend Louis Smet who went to Alexandria, Virginia. Smet had been ordained to priesthood by his uncle at the American College of Louvain.

=== Death ===
In September 1911, Van de Vyver made a final visit to Belgium to visit his relatives. By the time he returned to Richmond, Van de Vyver was gravely ill. Augustin Van de Vyver died on October 16, 1911, in Richmond. He was buried in Mount Calvary Cemetery in Richmond, a cemetery he founded as vicar-general of the diocese.

== Sources ==
- Magri, The Catholic Church in the City and Diocese of Richmond (Richmond, 1896);
- The Catholic Church in the United States of America (New York, 1909);
- Shea, Our Faith and its Defenders (New York, 1894);
- Catholic Directory (Milwaukee and New York, 1871–1911);
- Diocesan documents and newspaper files (Richmond, 1870–1911).
