= Lee Jong-chan (politician) =

South Korean politician (1916–1983)

- 이종찬
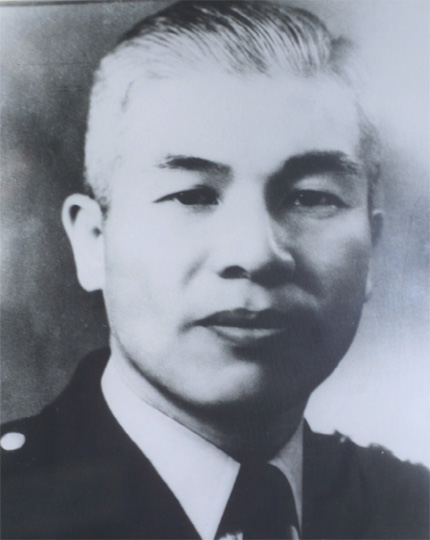

Minister of National Defense
- In office 2 May 1960 – 23 August 1960
- President: Syngman Rhee
- Preceded by: Kim Chung-yul
- Succeeded by: Hyun Suk-ho

Chief of Staff of the Republic of Korea Army
- In office 23 June 1951 – 22 July 1952
- Preceded by: Chung Il-kwon
- Succeeded by: Paik Sun-yup

Personal details
- Born: 10 March 1916 Jungnim-dong, Keijō, Korea, Empire of Japan
- Died: 10 February 1983 (aged 66) Hannam-dong, Yongsan District, Seoul, South Korea
- Resting place: Seoul National Cemetery
- Citizenship: South Korean
- Party: Independent
- Education: Imperial Japanese Army Academy; Korea Military Academy

Military service
- Allegiance: South Korea
- Branch/service: Republic of Korea Army
- Rank: Jiang (General)
- Battles/wars: Korean War

Lee Jong-chan (Korean: 이종찬; March 10, 1916 – February 10, 1983) was a South Korean military officer and politician. He served as the 8th Minister of National Defense, Ambassador to Italy, and a member of the 9th and 10th National Assemblies.

== Biography ==
He served as a military officer during both the Japanese colonial period—having been an officer in the Imperial Japanese Army and the Republic of Korea era. He is regarded as someone who opposed the dictatorship by emphasizing the political neutrality of the military.

After graduating from the Imperial Japanese Army Academy in June 1937 and serving in regions such as Manchuria and the South Seas Mandate, he returned to Korea following liberation. He spent the next three years in self-imposed seclusion, reflecting on his past service in the Japanese military. However, in 1948, he accepted repeated requests to join the Republic of Korea Armed Forces, entering the service as a specially commissioned Army colonel.

He saved Park Chung-hee from being purged after Park became implicated in the aftermath of the Yeosu–Suncheon rebellion. Lee served in the Korean War. During the Second Republic, At the time, Lee Yong-moon and Park Chung-hee attempted a coup, seizing upon President Rhee's unjust demand for martial law troops—a move the United States effectively tacitly approved. In 1952, he was approached by figures such as Lee Yong-moon and Park Chung-hee with a proposal for a coup d'état, but he rejected it and reported it to Prime Minister Chang Myon. He was dismissed as Army Chief of Staff in July 1952.

=== During the Second Republic ===
He served as the Commandant of the Army College for seven years before retiring as a Lieutenant General in 1960. Although he had been humiliated by the President during his tenure as Commandant, he twice rejected Park Chung-hee's proposal—made prior to the May 16 military coup—to appoint him as the supreme leader of the military revolution.

Following the April Revolution in 1960, he served as Minister of National Defense in the interim cabinet led by Ho Chong. During his tenure, he strove to uphold the military's political neutrality by purging officers who had colluded in the rigged March 1960 election and by requiring the Chiefs of Staff of the three military branches and the Marine Corps Commandant to take an oath of allegiance to the constitution. On May 19, 1960, Lee also announced plans to establish a military reorganization committee to improve the armed forces’ structure and efficiency.

=== Third and Fourth Republics ===
After initially criticizing the military government following the coup, he came to support the Third Republic and served as the South Korean Ambassador to Italy from July 1961 to September 1967. He served as a National Assembly member (representing the Democratic Republican Party) during the 9th and 10th terms, later switching his party affiliation to Yujonghoe in 1979.

After the National Assembly was dissolved in 1980 following the 1979 coup d'état, he served as president of the Seong-u Club, an association of retired generals. He became the CEO of Korea Engineering Co., Ltd., and was subsequently appointed as an advisor to the Korea Veterans Association; he also held positions such as president of the Korea-Italy Association and vice-president of the Korea-Japan Buddhist Council.
