= Haasdonk =

- Village
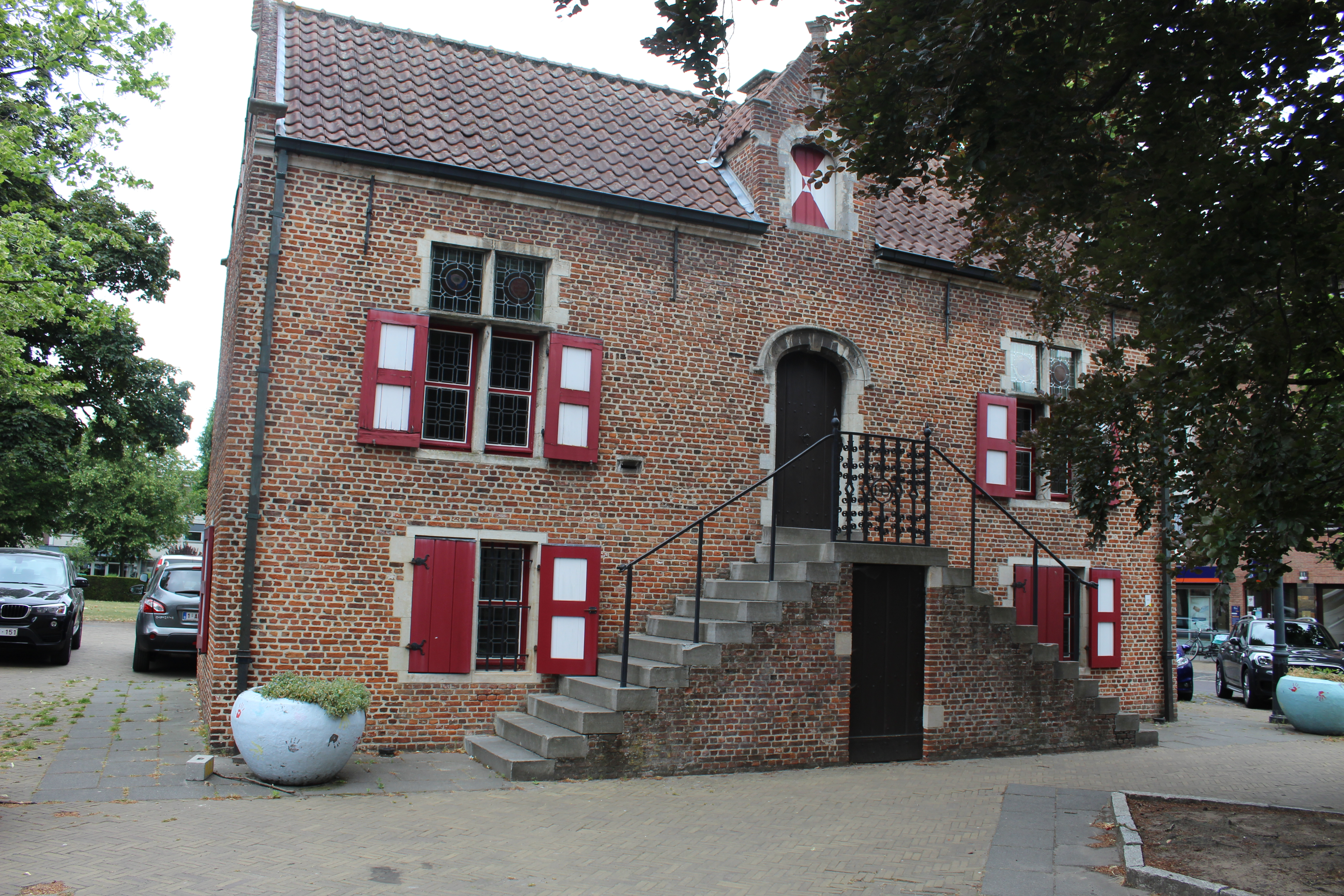
- Former town hall

- Location in Belgium
- Coordinates: 51.1794°N 4.2382°E
- Country: Belgium
- Region: Flemish Region
- Province: East Flanders
- Municipality: Beveren

Area
  - Total: 10.34 km^{2} (3.99 sq mi)

Population (2021)
  - Total: 4,357
  - Density: 421.4/km^{2} (1,091/sq mi)
- Time zone: CET

Haasdonk is a village and deelgemeente (sub-municipality) of Beveren in East Flanders, Belgium. Haasdonk was an independent municipality until 1 January 1977, when it merged with Beveren as part of the fusion of municipalities in Belgium. It is located about 12 kilometres (7.5 mi) west of Antwerp.

== History ==
Haasdonk is a road village which developed on the Roman road to Ghent. The village was first mentioned in 1150 when it became an independent parish.

In 1795, during the French period, Haasdonk became the seat of a canton and was governed by the infamous Jan Benedict de Kever. In 1798, all men between the age of the 20 and 25 were forcibly conscripted in the French Army which resulted in the Peasants' War, and Haasdonk became one of the centres of revolt. The canton was dissolved in 1800.

During the 20th century, Haasboek evolved from an agricultural community into a commuter's village. It used to be an independent municipality until 1977 when it was merged into Beveren.

== Buildings and structures ==
Between 1906 and 1914, Fort van Haasdonk was constructed as part of the National Redoubt to protect Antwerp against an attack from the west. The fortress saw no action during World War I, and was taken by the Germans after the surrender of Antwerp. It was extended with bunkers against a possible attack by the Netherlands. The story repeated itself during World War II, and Flak guns were added to fortress. In 1944, it was used by the Allied forces. Nowadays, it is private property and home to colony of bats.

The St Jacobus de Meerdere Church was founded in the 12th century. It was destroyed by Spanish troops in 1576. In 1609, it was replaced by a wooden church which in turn was replaced by a stone church in 1719. Between 1845 and 1875, the church was extensively modified and rebuilt into a three aisled basilica-like church without transepts in Gothic Revival style.

== Notable people ==
- Pascal Smet (born 1967), politician and Brussels Minister of Mobility and Public Works
- Augustine Van de Vyver (1844–1911), priest and Bishop of Richmond, Virginia

== Gallery ==
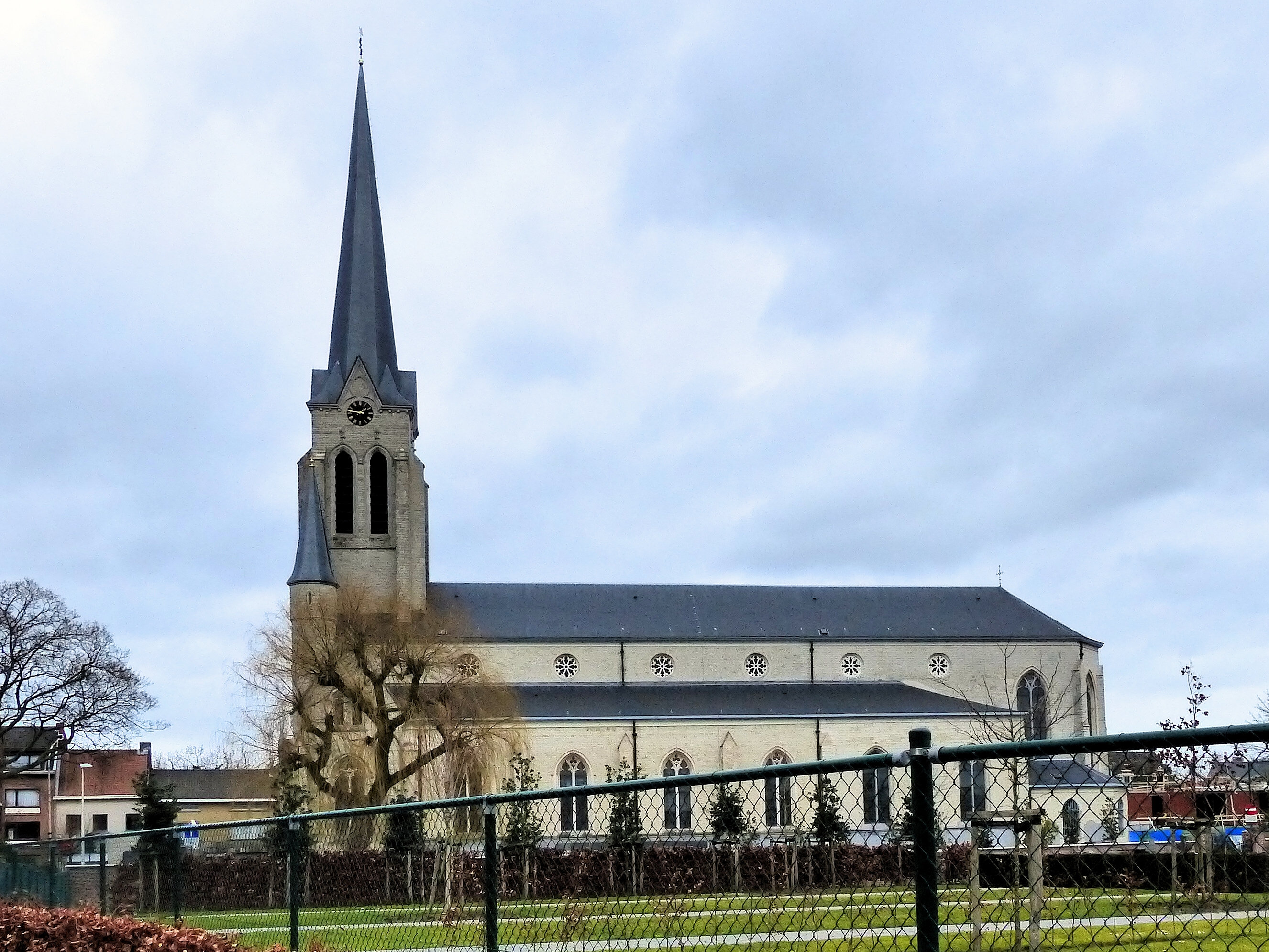
St Jacobus de Meerdere Church

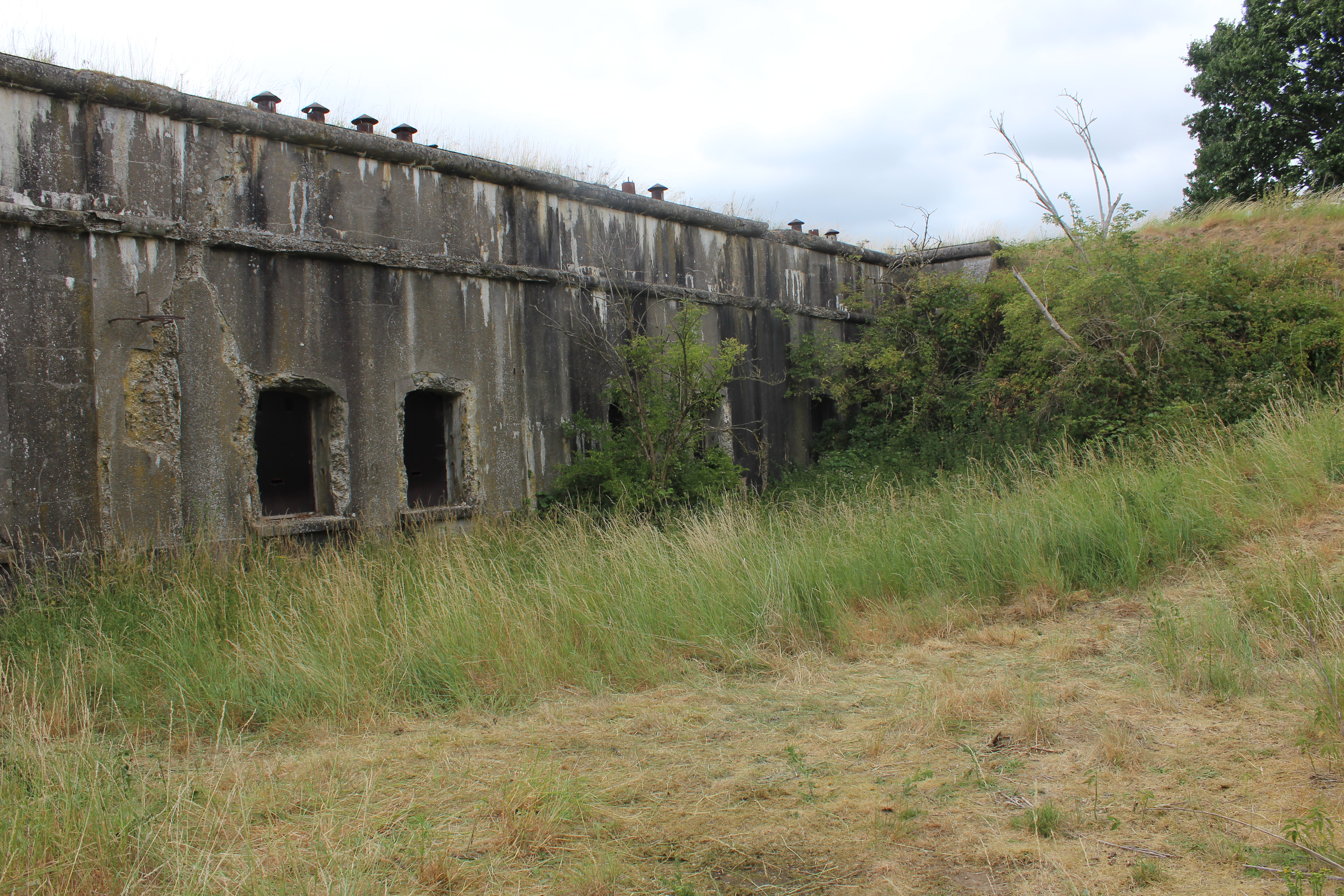
Fort van Haasdonk

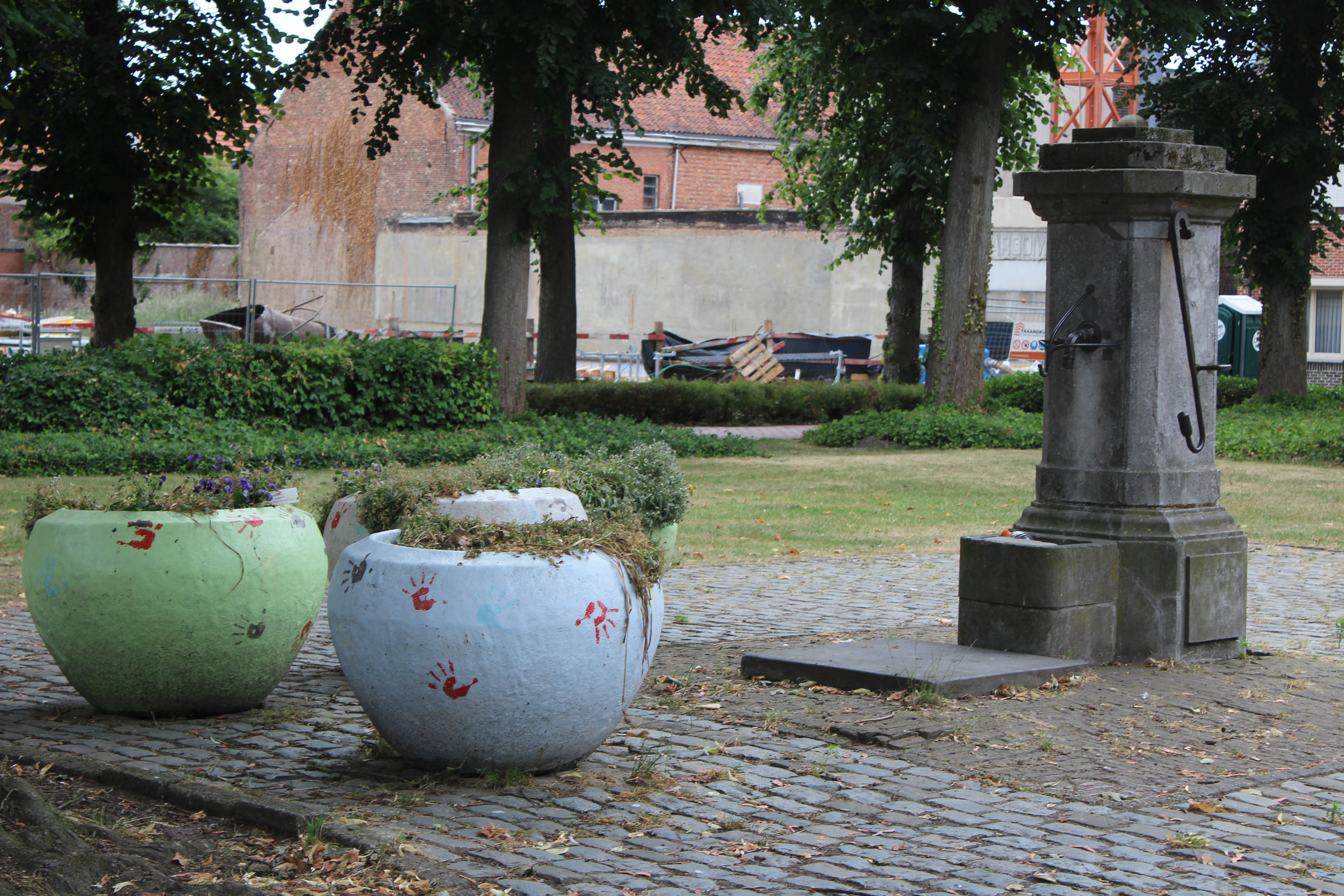
Village pump

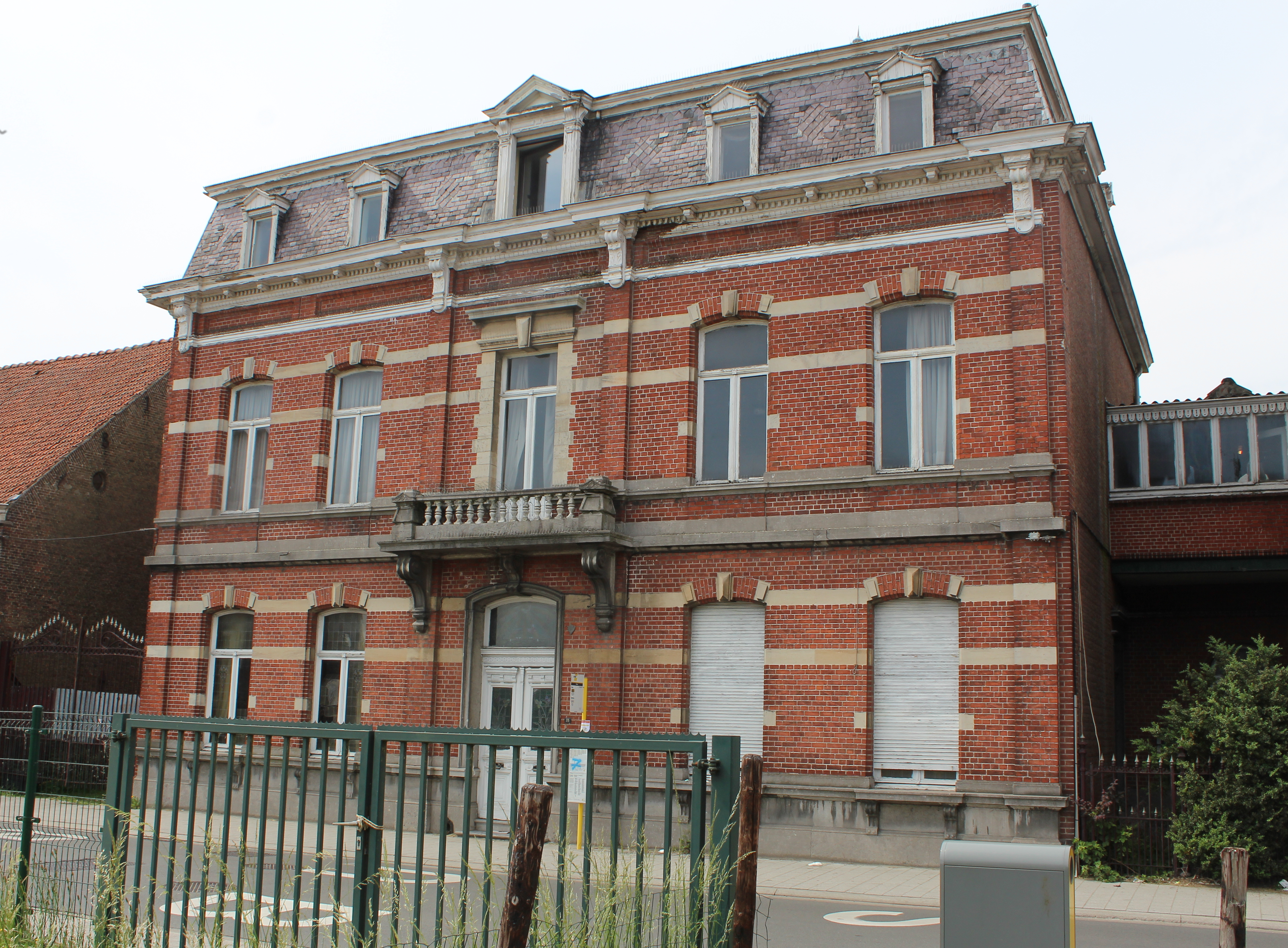
Former brewery 't Vliet
