= Saint Joseph's Catholic Church (Key West, Iowa) =

Catholic parish in the United States

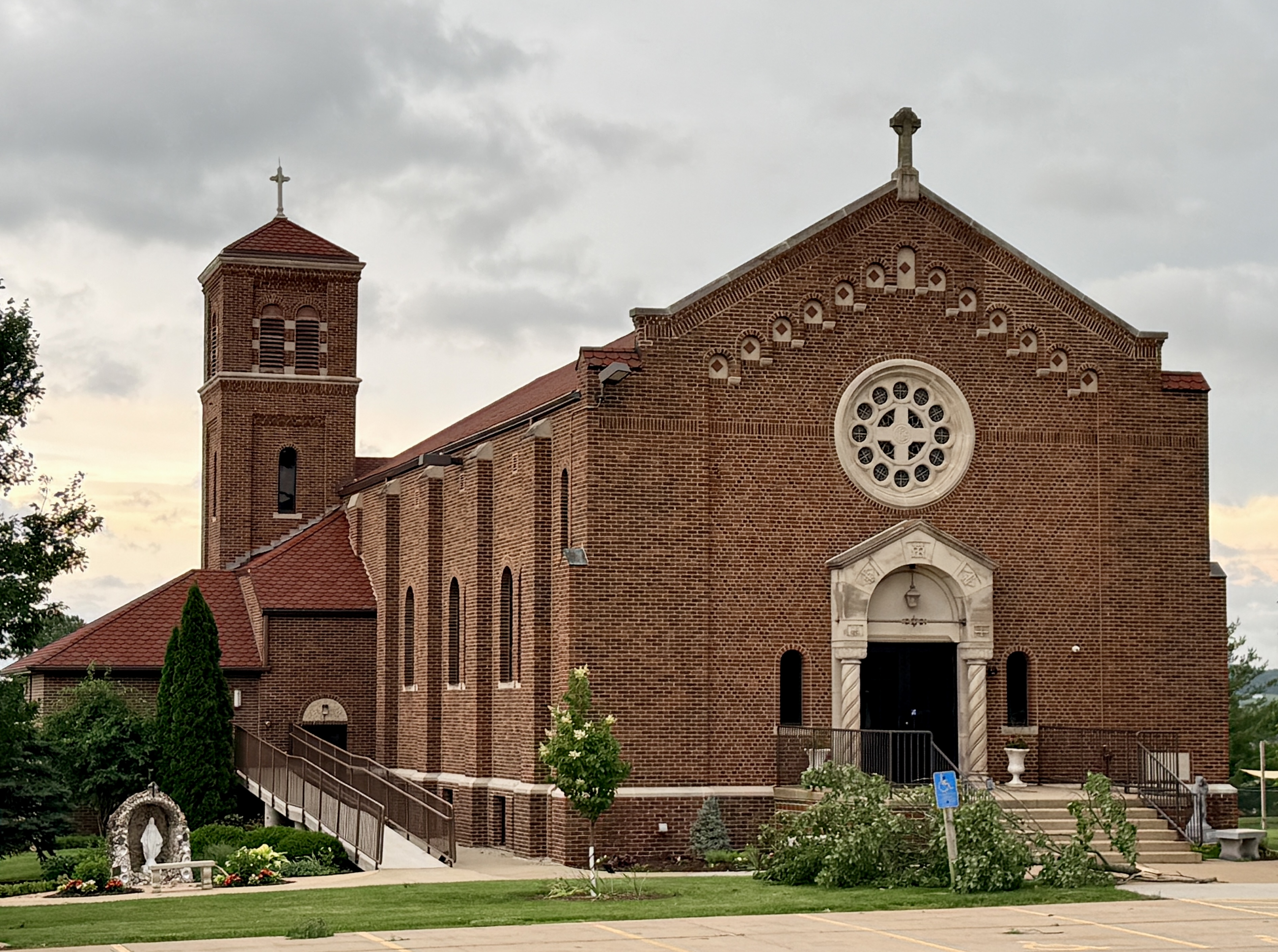
Saint Joseph's Catholic Church, as seen from nearby Mount Olivet Cemetery.

Saint Joseph's Catholic Church is a Roman Catholic parish located south of Dubuque, Iowa in the community of Key West, Iowa. The parish is part of the Archdiocese of Dubuque.

The church is across from Mount Olivet Cemetery, one of two main Catholic cemeteries for Dubuque-area Catholics. While people from St. Joseph's parish are often buried at Mount Olivet, the cemetery is not part of the parish.

== History ==
The parish was originally established in 1872 by Father Thomas J. O'Reilly for the Catholics living just south of Dubuque in Mosalem and Table Mound townships. Father James Ward was the first resident pastor.

In the late 1940s another Saint Joseph's Church was established about three miles away in Dubuque. This led to confusion on the part of people between the two parishes; at times one parish would receive mail meant for the other. As a result, St. Joseph's in Dubuque eventually changed its name to Saint Joseph the Worker Catholic Church in the 1990s.

During the 1990s the parish seriously considered demolishing the current church structure and replacing it with a new building. However the parish decided to keep their current church building, and instead make improvements to the parish school. The school mascot was the Cobras.
