= Chang Myon =

South Korean politician (1899–1966)

The Right Honourable Chang Myon
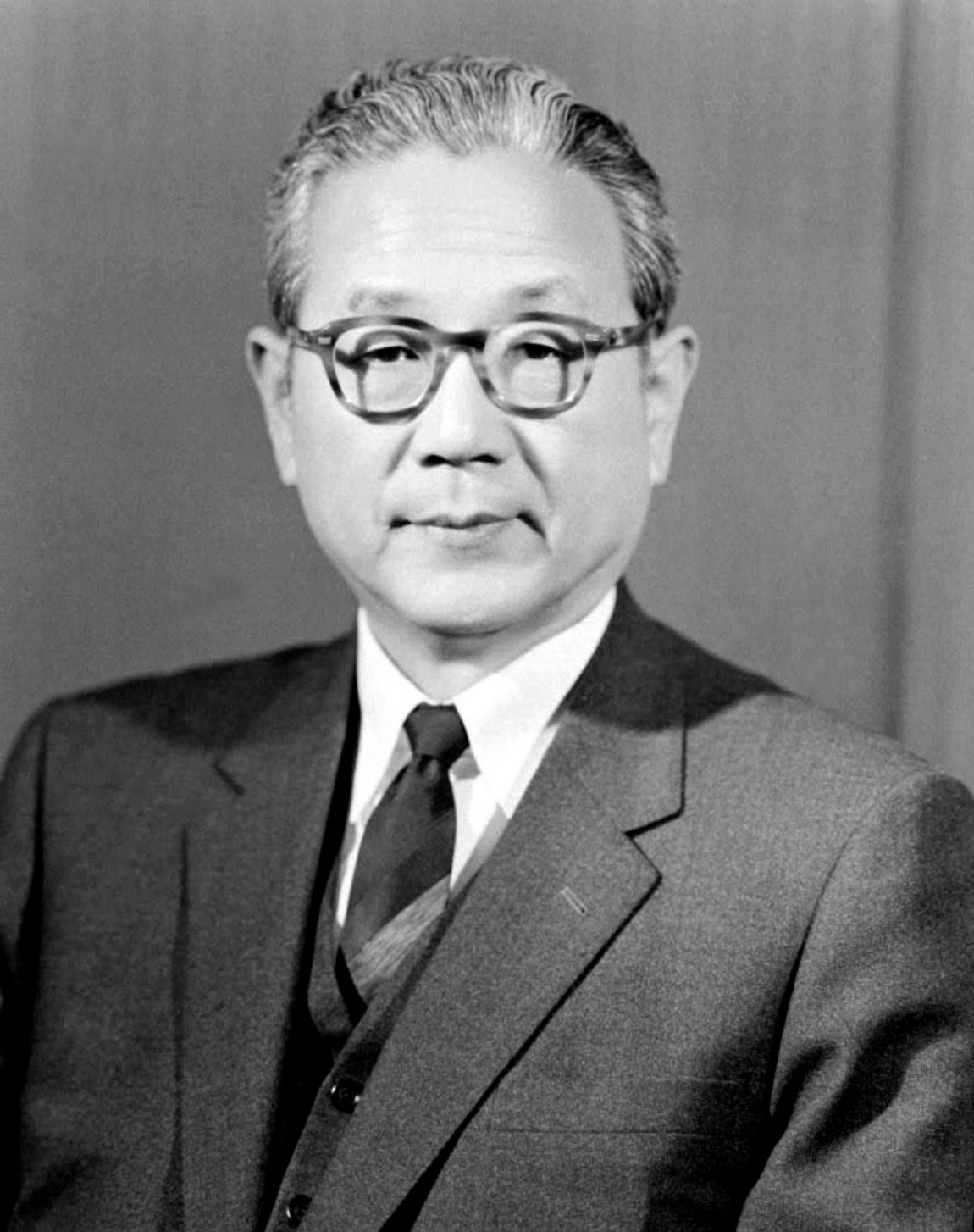
- Chang in 1961

2nd & 7th Prime Minister of South Korea
- In office August 19, 1960 – May 17, 1961
- President: Yun Po-sun
- Preceded by: Ho Chong
- Succeeded by: Chang Do-yong (Note: As Chief Cabinet Minister of the Supreme Council for National Reconstruction.)
- In office November 23, 1950 – April 23, 1952
- President: Syngman Rhee
- Vice President: Yi Si-yeong
- Preceded by: Shin Song-mo (acting)
- Succeeded by: Ho Chong (acting)

4th Vice President of South Korea
- In office August 15, 1956 – April 25, 1960
- President: Syngman Rhee
- Preceded by: Ham Tae-young
- Succeeded by: Ho Chong (acting)
- Acting; May 14, 1951 – May 16, 1951
- President: Syngman Rhee
- Prime Minister: Ho Chong (acting)
- Preceded by: Yi Si-yeong
- Succeeded by: Kim Seong-su

Personal details
- Born: August 28, 1899 Jeokseon-dong, Jongno District, Seoul, Korean Empire
- Died: June 4, 1966 (aged 66) Myeongryun-dong, Jongno District, Seoul, South Korea
- Party: Democratic Party
- Spouse: Kim Ok-yun
- Children: 9, including Chang Yik
- Education: Manhattan College
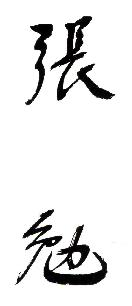
- Signature

Korean name
- Hangul: 장면
- Hanja: 張勉
- RR: Jang Myeon
- MR: Chang Myŏn

Art name
- Hangul: 운석
- Hanja: 雲石
- RR: Unseok
- MR: Unsŏk

Chang Myon (Korean: 장면; August 28, 1899 – June 4, 1966) was a South Korean statesman, educator, diplomat, journalist and social activist as well as a Roman Catholic youth activist. He was the only prime minister of the parliamentary Second Republic. In addition, during the First Republic he was the fourth and last vice president of South Korea. His art name was Unseok (운석). His English name was John Chang Myon (baptismal name, surname, given name, respectively).

Under Japanese rule, Chang worked in education as a school teacher, administrator, and principal. In 1948, he led the delegation of the Republic of Korea to the UN General Assembly. In 1949, he became the first ambassador of the Republic of Korea to the United States. In 1950, he successfully appealed to the United States and the UN to send troops to assist in the Korean War. On November 23, 1950, he was appointed the prime minister of the First Republic of Korea. From 1956 to 1960, he served as the vice president of the First Republic of Korea.

When Syngman Rhee's government was ousted by the student-led pro-democracy uprising of April Revolution, he was elected the prime minister of the Second Republic in 1960. After the country adopted a parliamentary system in response to Rhee's abuse of presidential power, Chang became the head of government. Chang Myon's government ended when Park Chung Hee led a successful military coup on May 16, 1961.

== Early life and education ==
Chang Myon was born in 1899 in Jeokseon-dong, Hansung. He was the first son of Chang Gi-bin and Lucia Hwang. His father was a revenue officer of the seaport of Incheon and later became superintendent of customs (Saeguanjiang) of the seaport of Busan.

In 1906, he began studying at Incheon Parkmun Primary School, (Note: 인천 박문 소학교; 仁川博文小學校) and graduated in 1912. He then went to Incheon Public Simsang Elementary School, (Note: 인천 공립 심상소학교; 仁川公立尋常小學校) graduating in 1914. He later attended Suwon Agriculture High School, (Note: 수원농업고등학교; 水原農業高等學校) and he graduated on May 25, 1917. In March 1916, he married Kim Ok-yun. They had six sons and three daughters.

=== Studying in the United States ===
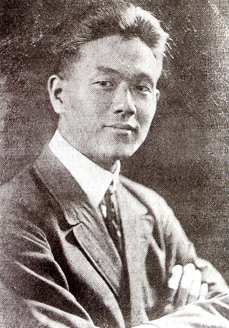
Manhattan College student, 1921

In September 1918, he was registered at the YMCA Village School, and from 1919–21 he taught at Yongsan Youth Catholic Theology School. (Note: 천주교 용산소신학교; 天主敎龍山小神學校) He participated in the 1919 March 1 Movement protests against Japanese colonial rule, but escaped arrest.

In January 1921, Chang Myon went to the United States with his younger brother Chang Bal to study. They were sponsored by the Maryknoll Catholic Foreign Mission Society of America. In September 1921, he entered Manhattan College and in 1924 took a one-year leave of absence from the college due to acute appendicitis. In August 1921, he entered the Secular Franciscan Order. After graduating from Manhattan College in July 1925, he left for Italy on July 30 to attend the beatification of 79 Korean Joseon Catholic martyrs. He was also received by Pope Pius XI. That August he returned to Korea.

== Early career ==
On December 2, 1925, he was appointed Maryknoll Center School's professor of the Korean language and translation. At the same time, he served as the leader of the laity for the Pyongyang archdiocese. On February 11, 1927, he formally entered the service of the Pyongyang Catholic church. He translated religious terms for Catholic teaching into the Korean language and published The Summary of Religious Terms in November 1929. In 1930, he published Way of the Seeker of Truth, (Note: 구도자의 길; 求道者之路) and on September 15 he published An Outline of Joseon Catholic History. (Note: 조선천주교공교회약사; 朝鮮天主敎公敎會略史)

On March 18, 1931, he resigned from the affairs of Pyongyang archdiocese (Note: 평양대교구; 平壤大敎區) and moved to Seoul. Appointed a teacher at Dongsung Commerce High School (Note: 동성상업고등학교; 東星商業高等學校) on April 1, 1931, he took on the responsibility of teaching English and rhetorical subjects. On July 10, along with Jeong Ji-yong, he published the first issue of Catholic Young Men's News. In 1935, he became Manager of Affairs for Dongsung Commerce High School. On April 1, 1937, he became the lay leader of Hyehwa-dong Catholic Church (Note: 혜화동 성당) and principal of Hyehwa Kindergarten. (Note: 혜화유치원; 惠化幼稚園) On November 19, 1936, he became principal of Dongsung Commerce High School. (Note: 동성상업고등학교 교장; 東星商業高等學校 校長) At the same time he took on the additional role of principal of Gyesong Elementary School (Note: 계성국민학교; 啓星國民學校) in Jongro, Seoul, in April 1939. That September, he was appointed chairman of the Seoul Catholic Young Men's National Union. (Note: 가톨릭 청년지; 天主敎靑年紙) He translated James Gibbons' The Faith of Our Fathers: A Plain Exposition and Vindication of the Church Founded by Our Lord Jesus Christ into Korean (Note: 『교부들의 신앙』) on July 4, 1944.

== Political career ==
=== Political activities ===
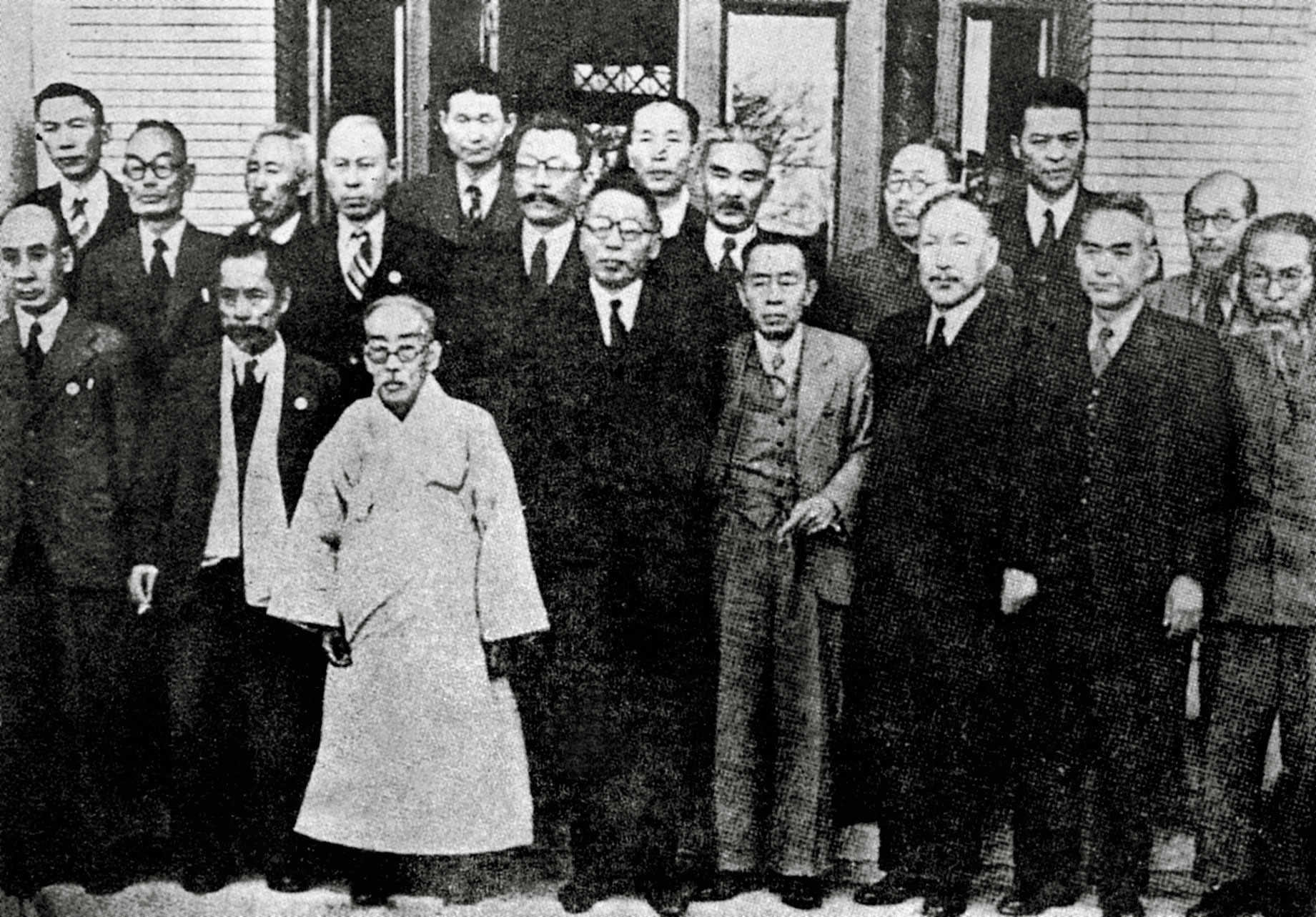
December 3, 1945. A photograph commemorating the return of the Provisional Government leaders with Chang Myon included

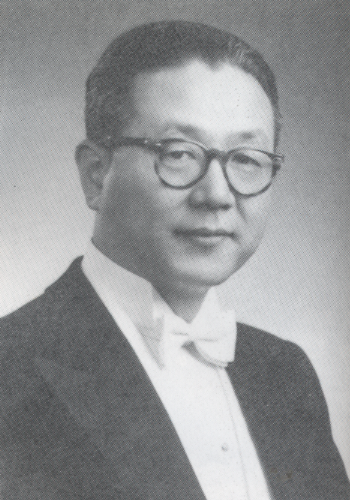
South Korean Ambassador to USA, 1949

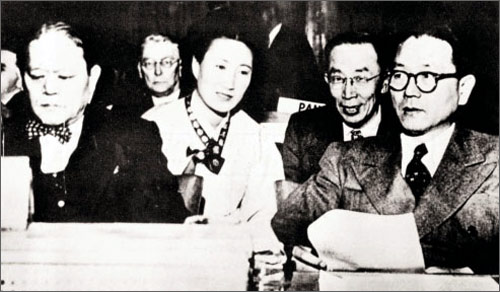
The Third UN General Assembly, 1948

On February 11, 1946, he was appointed a member of the Democratic Conference (Note: 민주의원 의원; 民主議院議員) and a Representative of Emergency Peoples Conference. (Note: 비상국민회의 대의원; 非常國民會議 代議員) That August, Chang was elected to the South Korean Provisional National Assembly. (Note: 남조선과도입법위원회 의원; 南朝鮮過渡立法委員會議員) By this time, he emerged as a major political figure in the Syngman Rhee administration of the First Republic of Korea.

On May 10, 1948, he ran for a National Assembly seat from Jongro District of Seoul, and he was duly elected on May 30. On October 11 of the same year, he led the delegation of the Republic of Korea to the UN General Assembly and witnessed the recognition of the Republic of Korea as a sovereign nation by the UN on December 12, 1948. In 1949, he visited the Vatican to express his appreciation of the Vatican's active support of his diplomatic endeavors.

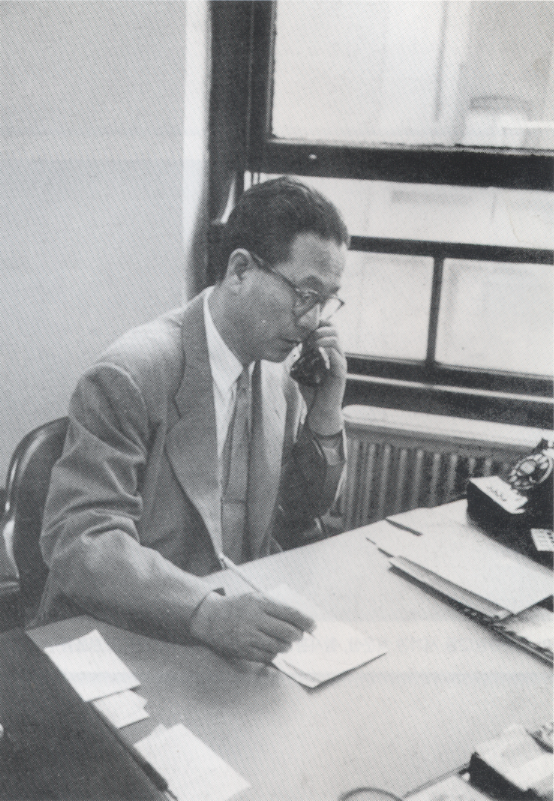
Republic of Korea Ambassador to USA, 1949

In December 1949, he was appointed the first ambassador of the Republic of Korea to the United States. In April 1950, he was designated a special envoy of the Republic of Korea to Australia, New Zealand, and the Philippines. Immediately after the outbreak of the Korean War, on June 25, 1950, he actively solicited urgent aide from the United States and the UN.

=== Prime Minister of the First Republic ===
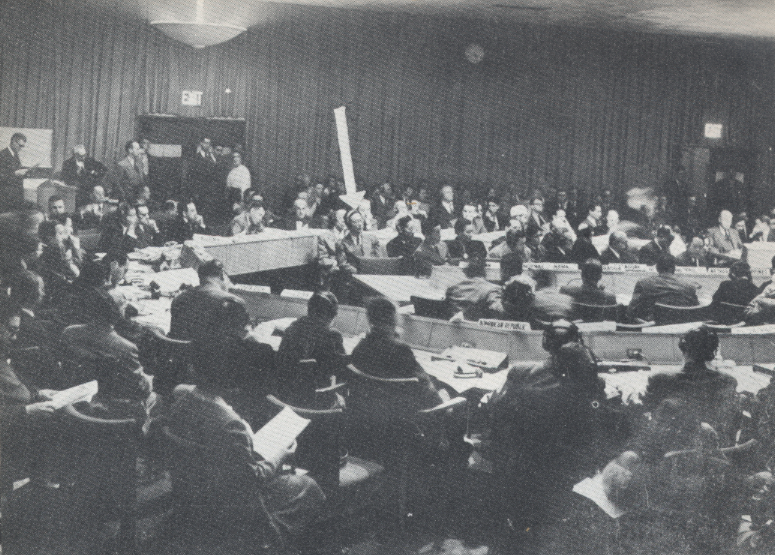
The 6th UN General Assembly, 1952

In November 1950, Chang was appointed the second Prime Minister of the First Republic of Korea, a position he at first refused, but after an earnest request from Syngman Rhee, he accepted and went on to serve from November 23, 1950 until April 23, 1952, during which has gain the ire of Rhee because of an extended stay in Hawaii. He was sent to the sixth UN General Assembly held in Paris, France.

The involvement of the Catholic Church with the democratic opposition to the Rhee administration first began in the 1950s. As the foremost leader of the opposition in the late 1950s, Chang Myon, a devout Catholic, already had a good relationship with Roh Ki-nam, the Bishop of Seoul, from the early 1940s. Roh soon came to be known as the "political bishop" because of his frequent critical statements on the dictatorial tendencies of Syngman Rhee.

In the 1950s, the governing Liberal Party was led by President Syngman Rhee. In April 1952, opposition lawmakers and some Liberal Party lawmakers attempted a constitutional amendment but were branded enemies of the state by Syngman Rhee. When the assembly voted to have martial law lifted in Busan, Rhee had half of them arrested. After a staged assassination attempt on Rhee, police began to investigate alleged links to the opposition. Police claimed that Chang Myon was working with assassins paid by North Korea to depose Rhee. Under this type of pressure, the assembly voted 160 to zero for Rhee's constitutional amendments. By the late 1950s Chang Myon emerged as the major alternative to Rhee, and in 1960, when Rhee was overthrown by the April 19 Movement and a popular revolution, Chang Myon was elected the Prime Minister of the Second Republic of Korea and de facto chief executive.

=== Vice president ===
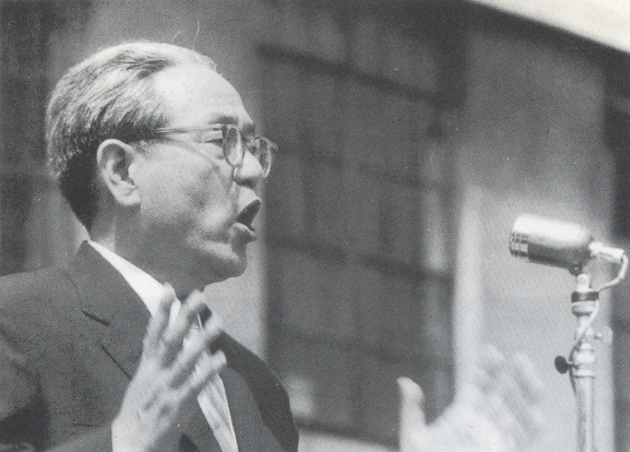
Chang's campaign for vice-presidency (1956)

On September 18, 1955, he was defeated by a narrow margin by Shin Ik-hee for the Democratic Party's candidacy in the presidential election. Instead, he was nominated for the vice-presidency as the running mate of Shin Ik-hee, who died suddenly on May 5, 1956. On May 30, 1956, Chang was duly elected the fourth vice president of the Republic of Korea.

On September 28, 1956, at the Democratic party's national convention in the Sigong Building (Note: 시공관; 市公館) in Jongno, Seoul, he was shot by a sniper in the September 28 Incident and received a penetrating wound to the wrist. The would-be assassin was immediately arrested. The assassination attempt was in all probability sponsored by the top echelon of the Liberal Party. During his vice presidency, Chang came into conflict with Lee Ki-poong, an influential Liberal Party member, who sent spies and placed him under surveillance.

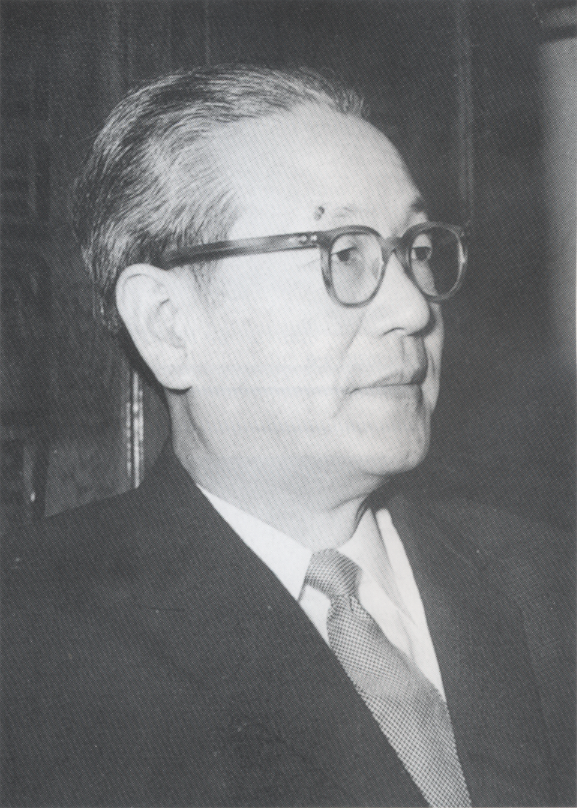
Vice presidency (1956)

In 1959, he was appointed a member of the Supreme Council of the Democratic Party of the Republic of Korea. In the same year, he became the Democratic Party's candidate for the vice-presidency and the running mate of presidential candidate Cho Byong-ok. Chang had attempted to become a candidate for the presidency, but once again he lost by a narrow margin, this time to Cho. In November of the same year, he was reelected as a member of the supreme council of the Democratic Party.

In the Republic of Korea's vice-presidential election of March 15, 1960, Chang suffered defeat at the hands of Lee Ki-poong by such a suspiciously large margin that protesters took to the streets alleging fraud. A thousand residents gathered in front of the opposition Democratic Party building in the southern city of Masan to protest. When the police started shooting, the protesters responded by throwing rocks. Following the suppression of the protests, the body of a young man, Kim Ju-yul, a student at Masan Commercial High School who had participated in the protests, was found on a nearby beach. This tragic incident served as a catalyst for the April 19 Movement and the popular revolution that overthrew the Rhee regime in May 1960.

=== Prime Minister of the Second Republic ===
In May 1960, Chang was a candidate in the election for a National Assembly seat. At the time, he was the leader of the New Group in the Democratic Party. (Note: 민주당 신파; 民主黨 新派) On August 18, 1960, he was duly elected the Prime Minister of the Second Republic of Korea. In this role, he was effectively the country's chief executive. In response to Rhee's authoritarian methods, the Second Republic adopted a parliamentary system with President Yun Posun as mostly a figurehead; real power was held by Chang and his cabinet.

When Syngman Rhee was forced out of office in April 1960 because of the Rhee administration and Lee Ki-poong's misgovernment of state affairs, compounded by the exposure of egregious corruption, the Republic of Korea found itself in serious disarray. Hence, the administration led by Prime Minister Chang Myon faced volatile political and grievous socioeconomic difficulties. In the midst of such difficulties, the Chang administration did not resort to dictatorship. After all, Chang Myon fought against the Rhee dictatorship for many years. He was a true believer in democracy. Moreover, his administration had successfully designed the first five-year economic development plan that would have proven beneficial for all Koreans. And this five-year economic development plan was "borrowed" by the Park Chung Hee administration. Park used virtually the same Five-Year Economic Development Plan, originally designed and drafted by the Chang Myon administration, for his economic development after the May 16 military coup.

In 1961, the Chang Myon administration attempted to resume talks on a treaty of relations between Japan and the Republic of Korea and discussed eight of the proposed articles designed to normalize diplomatic ties. However, the talks came to a halt because of the military coup led by Park Chung Hee on May 16. The Park Chung Hee government would later negotiate the 1965 Treaty on Basic Relations Between Japan and the Republic of Korea.

== Later life and death ==
Chang Myon's Second Republic of Korea was overthrown in the May 16 coup led by Major-General Park Chung Hee on May 16, 1961. On May 20, 1961, he was removed from the position of Prime Minister after less than one year in power.

On March 30, 1962, the Park Military Government detained Chang and prohibited him from engaging in any further political activity. Initially, he was under the threat of the death penalty. However, in August 1962, he was released on bail. In 1962, he wrote an appeal to Father F. I. Remler, entitled "Why Must I Suffer?". (Note: 『나는 왜 고통을 받아야 하나?』)

On January 27, 1966, Chang was hospitalized with hepatitis at the Holy Mother Hospital (Note: 성모병원; 聖母病院) in Seoul, and on June 4, 1966, he died in Jongro at the age of 66.

== Legacy ==
Chang was buried in the Hehwa Catholic Church burial site on the mountain Cheonbosan in Gyeonggi Province. On October 27, 1999, he was posthumously honored by President Kim Dae-jung of the Republic of Korea, with the first class rank of the Order of Merit for National Foundation. On the occasion of the hundredth birthday of Chang Myon, Cardinal Kim Sou-hwan celebrated a memorial mass at Hehwa Catholic Parish Church in August 1999. He rhetorically asked: "How is it possible for the leaders of the May 16 military coup to declare that the Chang Myon administration of the Second Republic was already corrupt and incompetent in less than a month of its inception?"

== Personal life ==
=== Family ===
Chang Myon's wife, Kim Ok-yoon, died at age 90 (1901–1990). They had six sons and three daughters. Their first two children died at an early age. The first child, Anna Chang Myeong-sook (baptismal name, surname, given name), died before age one, and the second child, Joseph Chang Young died at age two.

Joseph Chang Jin, Ph.D., was a professor of biology at Princeton University and Sogang University (deceased); Benedicta Chang Yi-sook, MFA, an artist and teacher, a member of the order of Sisters of Notre Dame de Namur; Andrew Chang Geon, MA, a successful architect; John Chang Yik, Catholic bishop of Chuncheon (deceased); Leo Chang Soon, Ph.D., a professor of political science; Matthew Chang Heung, Ph.D., a manager at the Bank of Paris; Teresa Chang Myong-ja, MA in Library Science, a librarian (deceased).

Chang Myon had two younger brothers and three younger sisters. The older, Louis Chang Bal, was an artist and dean of the College of Fine Arts, Seoul National University (deceased); the younger, Paul Chang Geuk, Ph.D., was a professor of physics and aerodynamics/space scientist at NASA, Catholic University, Washington, DC, and the Korean Advanced Institute of Science and Technology (KAIST), (deceased); the eldest of the three younger sisters was Gunaegunda Chang Jeong-hae (deceased), the second, Agneta Chang Jeong-eun, was a Maryknoll Sister and the founder and the mother superior of a Korean order in North Korea, Sisters of Our Perpetual Help, (deceased under fateful duress, October 1950); and the third was Martha Chang Jeong-soon, deceased in 1937 at the age of 21, a senior at Sacred Heart University.

=== Beliefs and lifestyle ===
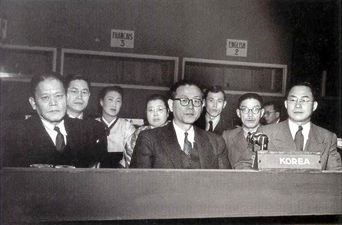
Third UN General Assembly, 1948

Chang Myon championed liberal and democratic values. Therefore, he was strongly opposed to communism as practiced by the Soviet Union and Nazism as practiced by Germany. Likewise, he firmly opposed totalitarianism and authoritarianism in any shape or form.

Chang believed in individualism in the context of common good. Thus, he abhorred endemic political and economic/financial corruption in the Republic of Korea. The word republic stands for res, things/affairs, and publica, public. In short, republic stands for things public, commonweal, public interest and/or common good.

Chang led a modest and frugal life. He lived in a small, unpretentious house (Seoul, Jongro-gu, Myongreun-dong, 1 Ga, 36-1) where he and his spouse spent most of their life and raised seven children. Anyone who visits the old house, now renovated, can readily see his life style. This house is now designated a National Heritage site and converted to be a museum dedicated to him. It is open to the public.

As a member of the National Assembly in the late 1940s, Chang initiated a legislation prohibiting concubinage and prostitution. It was duly passed. Throughout his life, he abstained from smoking and drinking, and enjoyed listening to classical music. He influenced the conversion of Kim Dae-jung to Catholicism and became his godfather. Kim later remarked that Chang was a "devout Catholic who believed in Catholic action to rectify many evils in Korea".

== See also ==
- Democratic Party of Korea
- Syngman Rhee
- Jang Jun-ha
- Heo Jeong
