= Mount Olivet Cemetery (Dubuque, Iowa) =

Cemetery in Dubuque County, Iowa, United States

Coordinates: 42.444°N 90.687°W

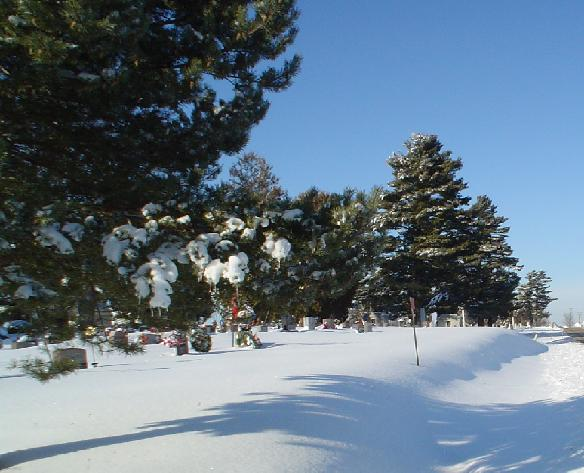
- Mount Olivet Cemetery in January 2005
- Interactive map of Mount Olivet Cemetery

Details
- Established: 1856
- Location: 10378 Military Road, Key West, Iowa
- Type: Catholic

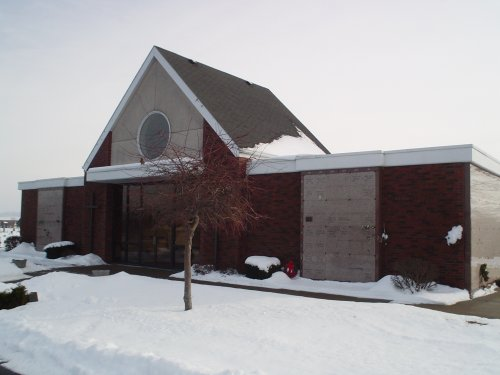
St. Joseph's Chapel Mausoleum. In addition to traditional mausoleum crypts, it also has a number of columbarium niches for cremated remains.

Mount Olivet Cemetery is a Catholic cemetery located at 10378 Military Road in Key West, Iowa approximately 4 mi (6.4 km) south of Dubuque. It is one of the two large Catholic cemeteries located in the Dubuque area. The cemetery is located near Saint Joseph's Catholic Church in Key West, but is operated independently.

The cemetery offers in-ground burial, as well as columbarium and mausoleum entombment. The cemetery is overlooked by the Centennial Cross.

== History ==
The cemetery began in 1856 and was known as the Key West Burying Ground. In 1901, the Mount Olivet Cemetery Association was formed and the cemetery was renamed Mount Olivet. Though a newspaper article from 1901 indicates that the board of 11 trustees planned to relocate graves from the Third Street Cemetery, adjacent to St. Raphael's Cathedral, to Mount Olivet, there is no record that these disinterments ever took place. At least 11 graves encountered during development of the Third Street property in the 1940s were moved to the Third Street Cemetery section of Mount Olivet, as were two sets of remains disturbed in the 1970s and four discovered in 1994. Over 900 graves were archaeologically excavated from the Third Street Cemetery between 2007 and 2011. The remains of these individuals were also reburied in the Third Street Cemetery section of Mount Olivet.

The board then hired O. C. Simonds to improve the cemetery grounds. Simmonds, who was the superintendent of Graceland Cemetery in Chicago, Illinois and was widely recognized as a landscape gardener, set about to improve the cemetery which was inaccessible to those not on-foot.

Former Dubuque Archbishops James Keane and John Keane are both buried in the cemetery.

Saint Joseph's Chapel Mausoleum is located at the northwest corner of the cemetery. The mausoleum was built in 1989, and was later expanded. This building has crypts for mausoleum entombment, columbarium niches for cremated remains and a small chapel for the final committal ceremonies.
