= Centennial Cross =

Monument in Dubuque County, Iowa

Coordinates: 42.445°N 90.695°W

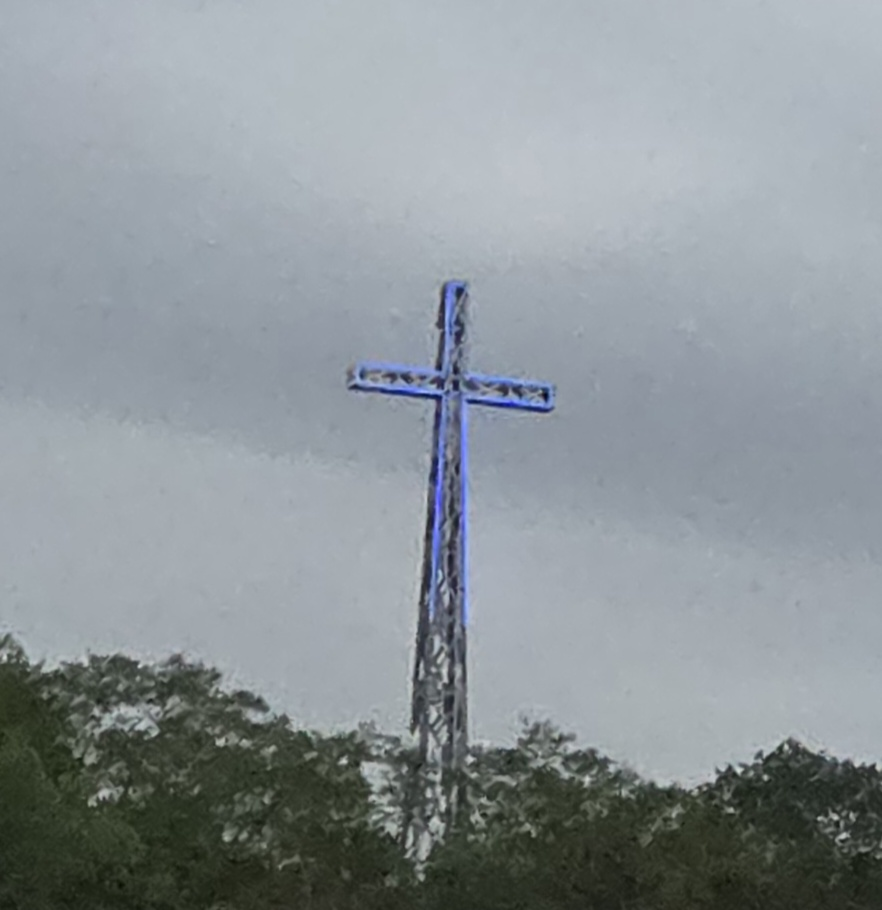
- Interactive map of Centennial Cross
- Location: Key West, Iowa
- Builder: Centennial Cross Incorporated
- Material: Galvanized steel
- Height: 75 feet (23 m) (old); 137 feet (42 m) (new)
- Completion date: 1937
- Restored date: 2024
- Dedicated to: Archdiocese of Dubuque
- Website: https://centennialcross.org/

Centennial Cross is a monumental crucifix found in Key West, Iowa. It was created in dedication to the Archdiocese of Dubuque. There have been two iterations of the cross after a replacement in 2024 to allow for better visibility.

== Design ==
The Centennial Cross is made of galvanized steel and covered with LED lights. The current cross stands at 137 feet (42 m) tall.

The cross overlooks Mount Olivet Cemetery.

== History ==
The original Centennial Cross was built in 1937 to commemorate the 100th anniversary of the Archdiocese of Dubuque. In the 1960s, the monument became lit in blue with neon lights.

Trees began to cover up the cross, obscuring the monument, even when lit up. As a result, in 2024, the Centennial Cross was rebuilt, increasing to a height of 137 feet (42 m). Lights were also renewed on the monument. Moving the cross was deemed too short-term of a solution. Conlon Construction was hired to erect the new cross. Installation occurred in June of that year. To fund the project, a fundraiser with a goal of $350,000 was organized.
