= St. Peter's Pro-Cathedral (Richmond, Virginia) =

Historic church in Virginia, United States

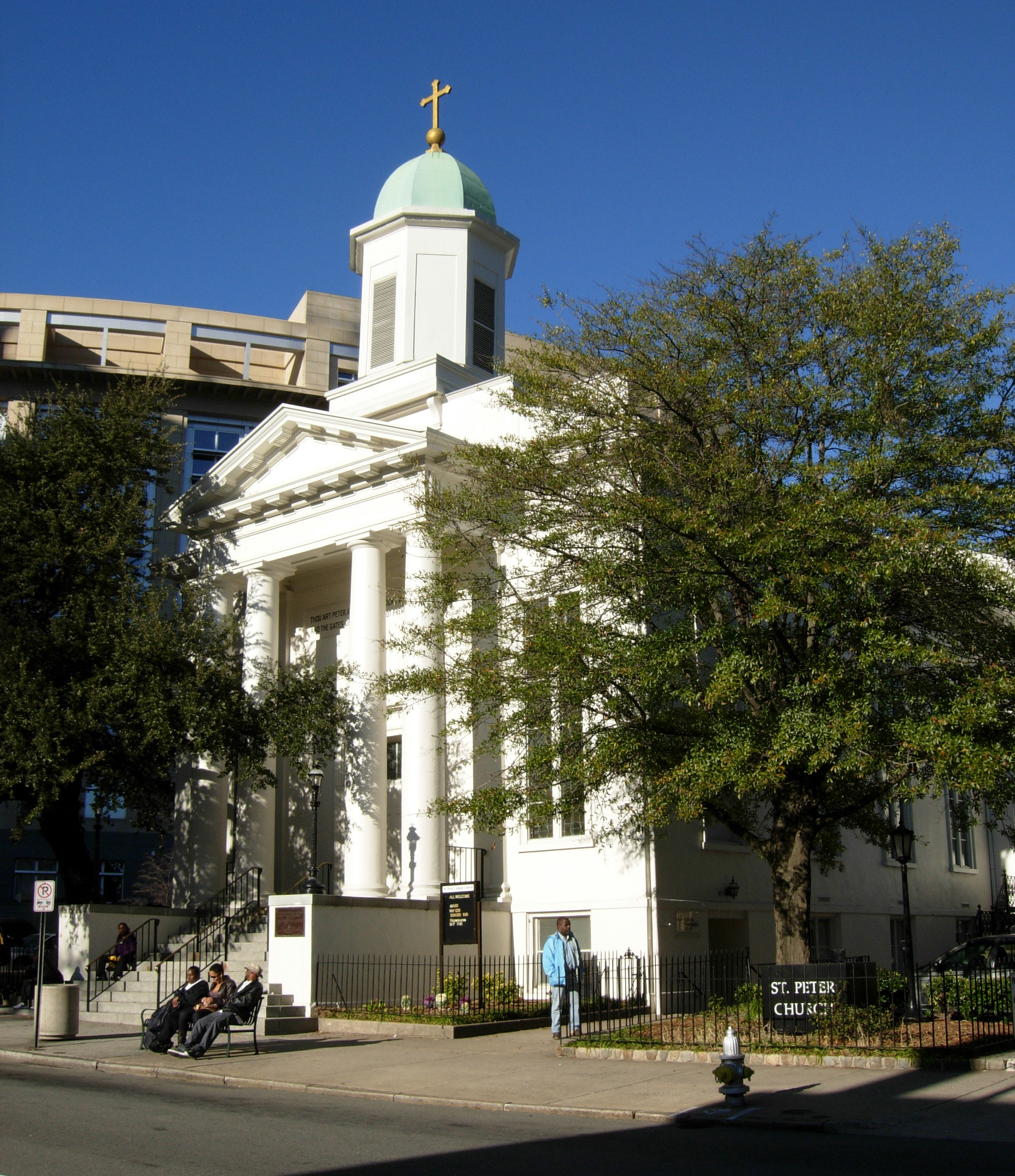

Religion
- Affiliation: Catholic Church
- Status: Active

Location
- Location: 800 E. Grace St., Richmond, Virginia, United States of America
- Interactive map of St. Peter's Pro-Cathedral

Architecture
- Style: Neoclassical
- Completed: 1834

Specifications
- Direction of façade: southwest
- Materials
- St. Peter's Pro-Cathedral
- U.S. National Register of Historic Places
- Virginia Landmarks Register
- Richmond City Historic District
- Location within Virginia Location within the United States
- Location: 800 E. Grace St., Richmond, Virginia
- Coordinates: 37°32′26″N 77°26′8″W
- Area: 0.2 acres (0.081 ha)
- Built: 1834
- NRHP reference No.: 69000358
- VLR No.: 127-0015

Significant dates
- Added to NRHP: June 23, 1969
- Designated VLR: November 5, 1968

Website
- http://www.stpeterchurch1834.org/

St. Peter's Pro-Cathedral is a Catholic church located in Richmond, Virginia, United States. It is the oldest Catholic church in the city. From the erecting of the Diocese of Richmond in 1850 until the completion of the Cathedral of the Sacred Heart in 1906, St. Peter's Church served as the cathedral and seat of the diocese. Originally, the church was predominantly Irish American. The church continued to serve a congregation of approximately 300 as of 2011.

After the Civil War, St. Peter's basement hosted the city's "colored Catholics." The 13-member congregation included Emily Mitchell (born into slavery in 1824, brought from Baltimore and later serving Bishop James Gibbons), Julia Grandison (baptised in Georgia and brought to Richmond at age 9), Moses Marx (who began driving Bishop John Keane's buggy at age 12), Liza Marx (who learned to read and reminded the judge reading her mistress' will that he forgot the lines bequeathing money to Elizabeth Thompson and her next child of issue), and Julia Flippen as well as her children. When the congregation had increased to about 50, including children, Bishop Keane signed a deed for what became St. Jos Church on Shockoe Hill, also inviting the Josephites for help in furthering the Black apostolate.

In 2020 the parish was designated a pro-cathedral as part of the Diocese of Richmond bicentennial celebration.

== Gallery ==
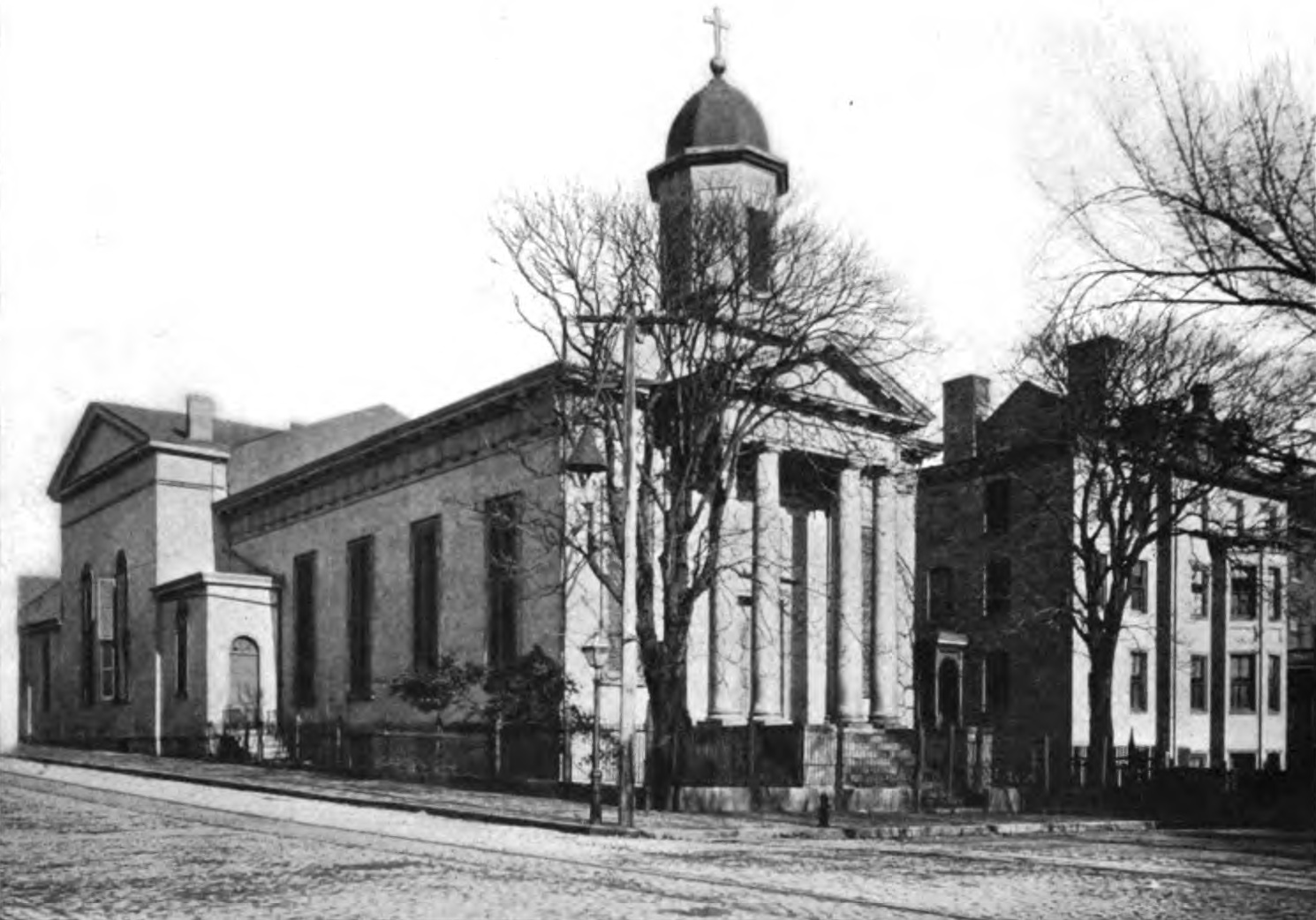
A photograph of the church from a 1914 publication

== See also ==
- List of Catholic cathedrals in the United States
- List of cathedrals in the United States
