= Cheonbosan =

Mountain in Gyeonggi, South Korea

Highest point
- Elevation: 336.8 m (1,105 ft)
- Coordinates: 37.766667°N 127.066667°E

Geography
- Location: Yangju, South Korea

Korean name
- Hangul: 천보산
- Hanja: 天寶山
- RR: Cheonbosan
- MR: Ch'ŏnbosan

Cheonbosan (Korean: 천보산) is a mountain in the Gyeonggi-do Province, South Korea, southeast of the city of Yangju, and north of Uijeongbu. Cheonbosan has an elevation of 336.8 m (1,105 ft).

A survey marker stone at the top of Cheonbosan indicates that it has an elevation of 423 m (1,388 ft), with three GPS readings averaging out to 417 m (1,368 ft).

== See also ==
- List of mountains in Korea
