= Jeokseon-dong =

- Interactive map of Jeokseon-dong
- Country: South Korea

Area
  - Total: 0.04 km^{2} (0.015 sq mi)

Korean name
- Hangul: 적선동
- Hanja: 積善洞
- RR: Jeokseon-dong
- MR: Chŏksŏn-dong

Jeokseon-dong (Korean: 적선동) is a dong (neighborhood) of Jongno District, Seoul, South Korea. It is a legal dong (법정동) administered under its administrative dong (행정동), Sajik-dong.

== See also ==
- Administrative divisions of South Korea
