= Catholic Young Men's National Union =

Roman Catholic voluntary organisation set up in the US in 1875

- Formation: February 22, 1875; 151 years ago
- Founder: George H. Doane
- Founded at: Newark, New Jersey, United States
- Purpose: Intellectual, moral, and physical advancement of Catholic youth
- Affiliations: Roman Catholic church

The Catholic Young Men's National Union was a Roman Catholic voluntary organisation set up in the United States in 1875. Its object was the intellectual, moral, and physical advancement of Catholic youth.

== History ==
The association was organized on February 22, 1875, at a meeting held in Newark, New Jersey, at the call of George H. Doane, who became its first president. It included about one hundred organizations, extending as far west as Mankato, Minnesota.

Its aims included the establishment and promotion of Catholic young men's associations, libraries, reading-rooms, and gymnasiums; and the maintenance and conduct of an athletic league. Initially, delegates met for an annual congress.

In 1878 the National Union inaugurated a successful movement for obtaining appointments of a greater number of Catholic chaplains to the army and navy.

The Catholic Summer School was an outgrowth of National Union plans. Warren E. Mosher, the secretary of the National Union at the time, was the founder of the Summer School.

At the convention of 1906, held in New York City, a committee was appointed to prepare a plan of re-organization, then adopted at the convention of 1907 held at Elizabeth, New Jersey. Under the original organization it had been required that the president and first vice-president should be clergymen; this was now changed, the various departments of the Union were organized on a business basis, the athletic work was systematized by establishing the Catholic Amateur Athletic League, a branch of the National Union with complete control over all athletic affairs.
