= Key West, Iowa =

- Unincorporated community
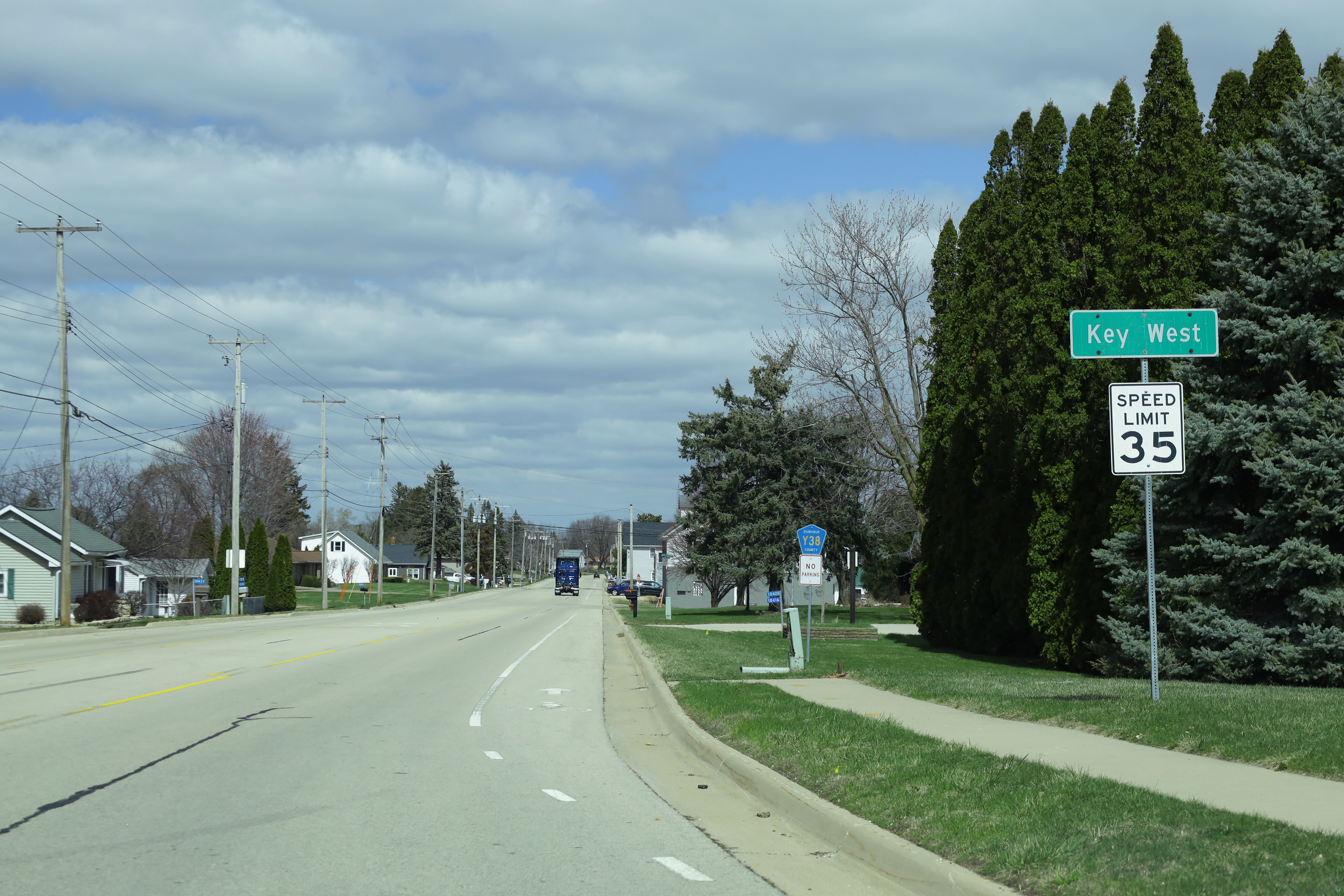

- Location in Iowa
- Coordinates: 42°26′56″N 90°41′02″W
- Country: United States
- State: Iowa
- County: Dubuque County
- Elevation: 820 ft (250 m)
- Time zone: UTC-6 (CST)
  - Summer (DST): UTC-5 (CDT)
- GNIS feature ID: 0458063

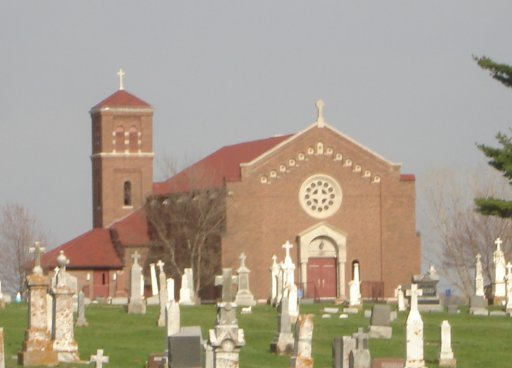
St. Joseph's Church in Key West

Key West is an unincorporated community in Dubuque County, Iowa, United States, near the extreme southern end of the city of Dubuque. Parts of the community are now within the city of Dubuque, while others are unincorporated. Owing to the presence of U.S. Highways 151, 61, and 52, and the nearby Dubuque Regional Airport, the area is home to a growing number of businesses. Some of these are high-tech companies being built in the Dubuque Technology Park, to the east. Development in the area will likely increase rapidly following the planned construction of the city's Southwest Arterial.

The village does have several local establishments that allow it to maintain a certain degree of autonomy. It has its own church, St. Joseph's - Key West Catholic Church, a school (Table Mound Elementary), a cemetery (Mt. Olivet), a Fire/EMS department, and a hotel/motel.

== Etymology ==
The town was named because it was considered the main egress from Dubuque westward.

== History ==
The town of Key West was settled in 1834, the year after Dubuque's founding. There was plenty of timber, prairie land and streams for water in section 12 of Table Mound Township, in Dubuque County, on the road that became the Old Military Road.

In 1937, the Centennial Cross was built to commemorate the hundredth anniversary of the Archdiocese of Dubuque. It was reconstructed in 2024.

== Demographics ==
Key West's population was 56 in 1902, and 52 in 1915. The population was 60 in 1940.

== Education ==
St. Joseph School, under the Roman Catholic Archdiocese of Dubuque, was in Key West.

Residents of Key West are served by Dubuque Community School District (DCSD).
