= Term limits in South Korea =

Term limits in South Korea are limitations on how long an officeholder may hold a specific government office in South Korea. The President of South Korea is limited to one five-year term without the possibility of reelection. Governors and mayors are limited to three four-year terms. Following its establishment in 1948, South Korea underwent a period of presidents loosening term limits and subsequently being removed from office through force. No president has overstepped or subverted term limits since the current government was established in 1987.

== Presidential term limits ==
The First Republic of Korea was established in 1948 under the Constitution of South Korea, creating the office of the President of South Korea with a limit of two four-year terms. The term limit was abolished in 1954. Syngman Rhee was the only president during this period, serving until he was overthrown after winning election to a fourth term.

The Second Republic of Korea was established as a parliamentary government in 1960, under which a ceremonial president was chosen by the legislature for a maximum of two five-year terms. Yun Posun was the only president during this period, and he was unable to serve a full term before the government was overthrown by a military dictatorship.

The Third Republic of Korea was established by the 1969 constitutional referendum, restoring the limit of two four-year terms. The term limit was abolished again by the 1969 constitutional referendum. Park Chung Hee was the only president during this period, being elected to three terms.

The Fourth Republic of Korea was established by the 1972 constitutional referendum, with unlimited six year terms for the president. Park Chung Hee continued to serve as president under this government, being elected to two terms before his assassination in 1979. Neither of his successors served a full term under this government.

The Fifth Republic of Korea was established by the 1980 constitutional referendum, with a limit of one seven-year term for the president. Chun Doo-hwan served as a military dictator under this government, but he did not complete a full term.

The sixth and current Republic of Korea was established by the 1987 constitutional referendum with a limit of one five-year term for the president. No president has exceeded the term limit under this government. Presidents Park Geun-hye and Moon Jae-in have called for constitutional reform to allow reelection for presidents.

== Local term limits ==
In 1995, South Korea introduced direct election of governors and mayors. All local government heads are permitted to serve for a maximum of three four-year terms.

== See also ==
- List of political term limits
- List of presidents of South Korea
