= List of political term limits =

This is a list of term limits for heads of state, heads of government and other notable public office holders by country.

== Africa ==
Country	Head of state		Head of government (if effectively supreme to a separate head of state) and other offices	
Country	Title	Maximum number of terms	Office	Maximum number of terms
Algeria	President	Two 5-year terms, since 2016 constitutional reform		
Angola	President	Two 5-year terms, since 2021 constitutional reform		
Benin	President	Two 7-year terms, since 2025 constitutional reform		
Botswana	President	Two 5-year terms, since 1998 constitutional reform		
Burkina Faso	President	No set terms (transitional)		
Burundi	President	Two 7-year terms, since 2018 constitutional reform		
Cameroon	President	Unlimited 7-year terms, since 2008 constitutional reform		
Cape Verde	President	Two 5-year terms		
Central African Republic	President	Unlimited 7-year terms, since 2023 constitutional referendum		
Chad	President	Two 5-year terms, since 2023 constitutional reform		
Comoros	President	Two 5-year terms, since 2019 constitutional reform		
Côte d’Ivoire	President	Two 5-year terms, since 2016 constitutional reform		
Democratic Republic of the Congo	President	Two 5-year terms, since 2005 constitutional referendum		
Republic of the Congo	President	Three 5-year terms, since 2015 constitutional referendum		
Djibouti	President	Unlimited 5-year terms, since 2010 constitutional reform		
Egypt	President	Two 6-year terms, since 2019 constitutional referendum		
Equatorial Guinea	President	Two 7-year terms, since 2011 constitutional reform		
Eritrea	President	Two 5-year terms, as per unenforced constitution (no set terms in practice)		
Eswatini	King	No set terms (hereditary succession)	Prime Minister	Unlimited 5-year terms, since 2005 constitutional reform
Ethiopia	President	Two 6-year terms, since 1987 constitutional reform		
Gabon	President	Two 7-year terms, since 2024 constitutional referendum		
Gambia	President	Unlimited 5-year terms, since 1996 constitutional reform		
Ghana	President	Two 4-year terms, since 1992 constitutional referendum		
Guinea	President	Two 7-years terms, since 2025 constitutional referendum		
Guinea-Bissau	President	Two 5-year terms, since 1996 constitutional reform		
Kenya	President	Two 5-year terms, since 2010 constitutional reform	Deputy President	Two 5-year terms, since 2010 constitutional reform
Lesotho	King	No set terms (hereditary succession)	Prime Minister	Unlimited 5-year terms, since 1998 constitutional reform
Liberia	President	Two 6-year terms, since 1986 constitutional referendum	Senators	Unlimited 9-year terms
Liberia	President	Two 6-year terms, since 1986 constitutional referendum	Representatives	Unlimited 6-year terms
Libya	Chairman of the Presidential Council	No set terms (transitional)		
Madagascar	President	Two 5-year terms, since 1992 constitutional referendum		
Malawi	President	Two 5-year terms, since 1995 constitutional referendum		
Mali	President	No set terms (transitional)		
Mauritania	President	Two 5-year terms, since 1991 constitutional referendum		
Mauritius	President	Unlimited 5-year terms, since 1991 constitutional reform		
Morocco	King	No set terms (hereditary succession)	Prime Minister	Unlimited 5-year terms, since 2011 constitutional reform
Mozambique	President	Two 5-year terms, since 2004 constitutional reform		
Namibia	President	Two 5-year terms, since 1999 constitutional reform		
Niger	President	No set terms (transitional)		
Nigeria	President	Two 4-year terms, since 1999 constitutional reform		
Rwanda	President	Two 5-year terms, since 2015 constitutional reform		
São Tomé and Príncipe	President	Two 5-year terms, since 2003 constitution reform		
Senegal	President	Two 5-year terms, since 2016 constitutional reform		
Seychelles	President	Two 5-year terms, since 2016 constitutional reform		
Sierra Leone	President	Two 5-year terms, since 1991 constitutional referendum		
Somalia	President	Two 4-year terms, since 1991 constitutional referendum		
South Africa	President	Two 5-year terms, since 1996 constitutional referendum		
South Sudan	President	Unlimited 4-year terms		
Sudan	President	No set terms (transitional)		
Tanzania	President	Two 5-year terms, since 1977 constitutional reform		
Togo	President	Two 5-year terms, since 2019 constitutional reform		
Tunisia	President	Two 5-year terms, since 2014 constitutional referendum		
Uganda	President	Unlimited 5-year terms, since 2005 constitutional reform		
Zambia	President	Two 5-year terms, since 2006 constitutional reform		
Zimbabwe	President	Two 7-year terms, since 2026 constitutional amendment		

== Americas ==
Country	Head of state		Head of government (if effectively supreme to a separate head of state) and other offices	
Country	Title	Maximum number of terms	Office	Maximum number of terms
Antigua and Barbuda	King / Queen	No set terms (hereditary succession)	Prime Minister	Unlimited 5-year terms
Antigua and Barbuda	Governor-General	No set terms; appointed by the monarch on the advice of the Prime Minister.	Prime Minister	Unlimited 5-year terms
Argentina	President	Two consecutive 4-year terms	Vice President	Two consecutive 4-year terms
Argentina	President	Two consecutive 4-year terms	Senators	Unlimited 6-year terms
Argentina	President	Two consecutive 4-year terms	Deputies	Unlimited 4-year terms
Bahamas	King / Queen	No set terms (hereditary succession)	Prime Minister	No directly set terms; however, they must maintain the support of the House of Assembly, which has a term of five years.
Bahamas	Governor-General	No set terms; appointed by the monarch on the advice of the Prime Minister.	Prime Minister	No directly set terms; however, they must maintain the support of the House of Assembly, which has a term of five years.
Barbados	President	Two 4-year terms	Prime Minister	No directly set terms; however, they must maintain the support of the House of Assembly, which has a term of five years.
Belize	King / Queen	No set terms (hereditary succession)	Prime Minister	Three parliamentary terms (max. 5 years each); and they must maintain the support of the House of Representatives, which has a term of five years.
Belize	Governor-General	Unlimited 7-year terms	Prime Minister	Three parliamentary terms (max. 5 years each); and they must maintain the support of the House of Representatives, which has a term of five years.
Bolivia	President	Two 5-year terms	Vice President	Two 5-year terms
Brazil	President	Two consecutive 4-year terms	Vice President	Two consecutive 4-year terms
Brazil	President	Two consecutive 4-year terms	Senators	Unlimited 8-year terms
Brazil	President	Two consecutive 4-year terms	Deputies	Unlimited 4-year terms
Canada	King / Queen	No set terms (hereditary succession)	Prime Minister	No directly set terms; however, they must maintain the support of the House of Commons, which by statute has a term of four years.
Canada	Governor General	No set terms; appointed by the monarch on the advice of the Prime Minister. Traditionally serves for one 5-year term alternating between Anglophone and Francophone appointees.	Prime Minister	No directly set terms; however, they must maintain the support of the House of Commons, which by statute has a term of four years.
Chile	President	Unlimited non-consecutive 4-year terms	Senators	Two consecutive 8-year terms
Chile	President	Unlimited non-consecutive 4-year terms	Deputies	Three consecutive 4-year terms
Colombia	President	One 4-year term	Vice President	Unlimited non-consecutive 4-year term
Colombia	President	One 4-year term	Senators	Unlimited 4-year terms
Colombia	President	One 4-year term	Representatives	Unlimited 4-year terms
Costa Rica	President	Unlimited non-consecutive 4-year terms, since 2005 constitutional reform	Deputies	Unlimited non-consecutive 4-year terms, since 1949 constitutional reform
Cuba	First Secretary	Two 5-year terms	Prime Minister	Two 5-year terms
Cuba	President	Two 5-year terms	Prime Minister	Two 5-year terms
Dominica	President	Two 5-year terms		
Dominican Republic	President	Two 4-year terms	Vice President	Two 4-year terms
Ecuador	President	Two 4-year terms	Vice President	Two 4-year terms
El Salvador	President	Unlimited 6-year terms	Vice President	Unlimited 6-year terms
Grenada	King / Queen	No set terms (hereditary succession)	Prime Minister	No directly set terms; however, they must maintain the support of the House of Representatives, which has a term of five years.
Grenada	Governor-General	No set terms; appointed by the monarch on the advice of the Prime Minister.	Prime Minister	No directly set terms; however, they must maintain the support of the House of Representatives, which has a term of five years.
Guatemala	President	One 4-year term	Vice President	One 4-year term
Guyana	President	Two 5-year terms		
Haiti	President	Two non-consecutive 5-year terms	Prime Minister	No directly set terms; however, they must maintain the support of the National Assembly, which has a term of six years for the Senate and a term of four years for the Chamber of Deputies.
Honduras	President	Two 4-year terms	Vice President	Two 4-year terms
Jamaica	King / Queen	No set terms (hereditary succession)	Prime Minister	Unlimited 5-year terms
Jamaica	Governor-General	No set terms; appointed by the monarch on the advice of the Prime Minister.	Prime Minister	Unlimited 5-year terms
Mexico	President	One 6-year term	Senators	Two consecutive 6-year terms (since 2018)
Mexico	President	One 6-year term	Deputies	Four consecutive 3-year terms (since 2018)
Nicaragua	President	Unlimited 5-year terms	Vice President	Unlimited 5-year terms
Panama	President	Two non-consecutive 5-year terms	Vice President	Two non-consecutive 5-year terms
Paraguay	President	One 5-year term	Vice President	One 5-year term
Peru	President	Unlimited non-consecutive 5-year terms	Vice President	Unlimited non-consecutive 5-year terms
Peru	President	Unlimited non-consecutive 5-year terms	Senators	Unlimited non-consecutive 5-year terms
Peru	President	Unlimited non-consecutive 5-year terms	Deputies	Unlimited non-consecutive 5-year terms
Saint Kitts and Nevis	King / Queen	No set terms (hereditary succession)	Prime Minister	No directly set terms; however, they must maintain the support of the National Assembly, which has a term of five years.
Saint Kitts and Nevis	Governor-General	No set terms; appointed by the monarch on the advice of the Prime Minister.	Prime Minister	No directly set terms; however, they must maintain the support of the National Assembly, which has a term of five years.
Saint Lucia	King / Queen	No set terms (hereditary succession)	Prime Minister	Unlimited 5-year terms
Saint Lucia	Governor-General	No set terms; appointed by the monarch on the advice of the Prime Minister.	Prime Minister	Unlimited 5-year terms
Saint Vincent and the Grenadines	King / Queen	No set terms (hereditary succession)	Prime Minister	Unlimited 5-year terms
Saint Vincent and the Grenadines	Governor-General	No set terms; appointed by the monarch on the advice of the Prime Minister.	Prime Minister	Unlimited 5-year terms
Suriname	President	Unlimited 5-year terms	Vice President	Unlimited 5-year terms
Trinidad and Tobago	President	Two 5-year terms	Prime Minister	Unlimited 5-year terms
United States	President	Two 4-year terms, except after succeeding to the Presidency and serving more than two years, in which case only one subsequent four-year term is permitted (see Twenty-second Amendment).	Vice President	Unlimited 4-year terms
United States	President	Two 4-year terms, except after succeeding to the Presidency and serving more than two years, in which case only one subsequent four-year term is permitted (see Twenty-second Amendment).	Senators	Unlimited 6-year terms
United States	President	Two 4-year terms, except after succeeding to the Presidency and serving more than two years, in which case only one subsequent four-year term is permitted (see Twenty-second Amendment).	Representatives	Unlimited 2-year terms
Uruguay	President	Unlimited non-consecutive 5-year terms	Vice President	Unlimited non-consecutive 5-year terms
Venezuela	President	Unlimited 6-year terms, since 2009 constitutional referendum	Vice President	No fixed terms

== Asia ==
Country	Head of state		Head of government (if effectively supreme to a separate head of state) and other offices	
Country	Title	Maximum number of terms	Office	Maximum number of terms
Afghanistan	Supreme Leader	No set terms (life tenure)	Prime Minister	No directly set terms; appointed by the Supreme Leader.
Armenia	President	One 7-year term	Prime Minister	No directly set terms; however, they must maintain the support of the National Assembly, which has a term of five years.
Azerbaijan	President	Unlimited 7-year terms		
Bahrain	King	No set terms (hereditary succession)	Crown Prince	No directly set terms; appointed by the King.
Bahrain	King	No set terms (hereditary succession)	Prime Minister	No directly set terms; appointed by the King.
Bangladesh	President	Two 5-year terms	Prime Minister	No directly set terms; however, they must maintain the support of the President, who has a term of five years, as well as the support of the Jatiya Sangsad, which has a term of five years.
Bhutan	King	No set terms (hereditary succession)	Prime Minister	No directly set terms; however, they must maintain the support of the Parliament, which has an undefined term not exceeding six years.
Brunei	Sultan	No set terms (hereditary succession)	Crown Prince	No directly set terms; appointed by the Sultan.
Brunei	Sultan	No set terms (hereditary succession)	Prime Minister	No directly set terms; appointed by the Sultan.
Cambodia	King	No set terms (hereditary succession)	Prime Minister	No term limits
China	General Secretary	Unlimited 5-year terms	Vice President	Unlimited 5-year terms, since 2018 constitutional reform
China	President	Unlimited 5-year terms, since 2018 constitutional reform	Premier	Two consecutive 5-year terms (two consecutive terms of National People's Congress session)
Cyprus	President	Two consecutive 5-year terms, since 2019 constitutional reform	Representatives	Unlimited 5-year terms
East Timor	President	Two 5-year terms	Prime Minister	No directly set terms; however, they must maintain the support of the National Parliament, which has a term of five years.
Georgia	President	Two 5-year terms	Prime Minister	No directly set terms; however, they must maintain the support of the Parliament, which has a term of four years.
Hong Kong	Chief Executive	Two consecutive 5-year terms		
India	President	Unlimited 5-year terms	Vice President	Unlimited 5-year terms
India	President	Unlimited 5-year terms	Prime Minister	No directly set terms; however, they must maintain the support of the lower house of the Parliament of India, which has a term of five years.
India	President	Unlimited 5-year terms	Members of the Rajya Sabha	Unlimited 6-year terms
India	President	Unlimited 5-year terms	Members of the Lok Sabha	Unlimited 5-year terms
Indonesia	President	Two 5-year terms	Vice President	Two 5-year terms
Iran	Supreme Leader	No set terms (life tenure)	President	Two consecutive 4-year terms
Iraq	President	Two 4-year terms	Prime Minister	Unlimited 4-year terms
Israel	President	One 7-year term	Prime Minister	Between 1948 and 1996, and since 2001: No directly set terms; however, they must maintain the support of the Knesset, which has an undefined term not exceeding four years.
Israel	President	One 7-year term	Prime Minister	Between 1996 and 2001 (when the Prime Minister was directly elected): Unlimited undefined terms. If a term exceeded seven years, the Prime Minister was not eligible for immediate re-election.
Japan	Emperor	No set terms (hereditary succession)	Prime Minister	No directly set terms; however, they must maintain the support of the House of Representatives, which has a term of four years.
Japan	Emperor	No set terms (hereditary succession)	Members of the House of Councillors	Unlimited 6-year terms
Japan	Emperor	No set terms (hereditary succession)	Members of the House of Representatives	Unlimited 4-year terms
Jordan	King	No set terms (hereditary succession)	Prime Minister	No directly set terms; however, they must maintain the support of the Parliament, which has a term of four years.
Kazakhstan	President	One 7-year term		
Kuwait	Emir	No set terms (hereditary succession)	Crown Prince	No directly set terms; appointed by the Emir.
Kuwait	Emir	No set terms (hereditary succession)	Prime Minister	Unlimited 4-year terms
Kyrgyzstan	President	Two 5-year terms		
Laos	General Secretary	Unlimited 5-year terms	Prime Minister	Two 5-year terms
Laos	President	Two 5-year terms	Prime Minister	Two 5-year terms
Lebanon	President	Unlimited non-consecutive 6-year terms	Prime Minister	No directly set terms; however, they must maintain the support of the President, who has a term of six years, as well as the support of the Parliament, which has an undefined term not exceeding four years.
Macau	Chief Executive	Two consecutive 5-year terms	Members of the Legislative Assembly	Unlimited 4-year terms
Malaysia	King	Unlimited non-consecutive 5-year terms	Prime Minister	No directly set terms; however, they must maintain the support of the lower house of the Parliament of Malaysia, which has a term of five years.
Maldives	President	Two 5-year terms, since 1998		
Mongolia	President	One 6-year term (Two 4-year terms until 2021)	Prime Minister	No directly set terms; however, they must maintain the support of the State Great Khural, which has a term of four years.
Myanmar	President	Two 5-year terms		
Nepal	President	Two 5-year terms		
North Korea	General Secretary	Unlimited 5-year terms	Premier	Unlimited 5-year terms
North Korea	President of State Affairs	Unlimited 5-year terms	Premier	Unlimited 5-year terms
Oman	Sultan	No set terms (hereditary succession)	Crown Prince	No directly set terms; appointed by the Sultan.
Pakistan	President	Two 5-year terms	Prime Minister	No directly set terms; however, they must maintain the support of the Parliament, which has a term of five years.
Philippines (main article)	President	One 6-year term	Vice President	Two consecutive 6-year terms
Philippines (main article)	President	One 6-year term	Senators	Two consecutive 6-year terms
Philippines (main article)	President	One 6-year term	Representatives of the House	Three consecutive 3-year terms
Philippines (main article)	President	One 6-year term	All other local government officials	Three consecutive 3-year terms
Qatar	Emir	No set terms (hereditary succession)	Prime Minister	No directly set terms; appointed by the Emir.
Russia (main article)	President	Two 6-year terms	Prime Minister	No directly set terms; however, they must maintain the support of the President, who has a term of six years, as well as the support of the State Duma, which has a term of five years.
Saudi Arabia	King	No set terms (hereditary succession)	Crown Prince	No directly set terms; appointed by the King.
Saudi Arabia	King	No set terms (hereditary succession)	Prime Minister	No directly set terms; appointed by the King.
South Korea (main article)	President	One 5-year term	Prime Minister	No directly set terms; however, they must maintain the support of the President, who has a term of five years, as well as the support of the National Assembly of South Korea, which has a term of four years.
Singapore	President	Unlimited 6-year terms	Prime Minister	Unlimited 5-year terms
Sri Lanka	President	Two 5-year terms	Prime Minister	No directly set terms; however, they must maintain the support of the President, who has a term of five years, as well as the Parliament, which has a term of five years.
Syria	President	No set terms (transitional)	Members of the People's Assembly	Unlimited 30-month terms
Republic of China	President	Two consecutive 4-year terms, since 1994	Vice President	Two consecutive 4-year terms, since 1994
Republic of China	President	Two consecutive 4-year terms, since 1994	Members of the Legislative Yuan	Unlimited 4-year terms since 2008
Republic of China	President	Two consecutive 4-year terms, since 1994	County, city and township councilors, and village chiefs	Unlimited 4-year terms
Republic of China	President	Two consecutive 4-year terms, since 1994	County magistrates, and city and township mayors	Two consecutive 4-year terms
Tajikistan	President	Two 7-year terms		
Thailand	King	No set terms (hereditary succession)	Prime Minister	Two 4-year terms
Turkey	President	Two 5-year terms	Members of the Grand National Assembly of Turkey	Unlimited 5-year terms
Turkmenistan	President	Unlimited 7-year terms		
United Arab Emirates	President	Unlimited 5-year terms	Vice President	Unlimited 5-year terms
United Arab Emirates	President	Unlimited 5-year terms	Prime Minister	No directly set terms; appointed by the President.
Uzbekistan	President	Two 7-year terms, since 2023 constitutional reform		
Vietnam	General Secretary	Unlimited 5-year terms (in practice two 5-years terms)	Vice President	Unlimited 5-year terms (in practice two 5-years terms)
Vietnam	President	Unlimited 5-year terms (in practice two 5-years terms)	Prime Minister	Unlimited 5-year terms (in practice two 5-years terms)
Yemen	Chairman of the Presidential Leadership Council	No set terms (transitional)	Prime Minister	No set terms; however, they must maintain the support of the House of Representatives, which has a term of six years.

== Europe ==
Country	Head of state		Head of government (if effectively supreme to a separate head of state) and other offices	
Country	Title	Maximum number of terms	Title	Maximum number of terms
Albania	President	Two 5-year terms	Prime Minister	No directly set terms; however, they must maintain the support of the Parliament, which has a term of four years.
Andorra	Co-princes	Bishop of Urgell: No set terms; appointed by the Pope; President of France: Two consecutive 5-year terms since 2008 constitutional reform	Prime Minister	Unlimited 4-year terms
Andorra	Personal Representatives	No set terms; appointed by their respective co-princes.	Prime Minister	Unlimited 4-year terms
Armenia	President	One 7-year term	Prime Minister	No directly set terms; however, they must maintain the support of the National Assembly, which has a term of five years.
Austria	President	Two consecutive 6-year terms	Chancellor	No directly set terms; however, they must maintain the support of the President, who has a term of six years, as well as the support of the National Council, which has a term of five years.
Azerbaijan	President	Unlimited 7-year terms		
Belarus	President	Two 5-year terms (since 2022)	Prime Minister	No directly set terms; however, they must maintain the support of the National Assembly, which has a term of five years.
Belgium	King	No set terms (hereditary succession)	Prime Minister	No directly set terms; however, they must maintain the support of the Chamber of Representatives, which has a term of five years.
Bosnia and Herzegovina	Presidency members	Two 4-year terms, reeligible after four years	Chairman of the Council of Ministers (equivalent of Prime Minister)	No directly set terms; however, they must maintain the support of the House of Representatives, which has a term of four years.
Bulgaria	President	Two 5-year terms	Prime Minister	No directly set terms; however, they must maintain the support of the National Assembly, which has a term of four years.
Croatia	President	Two 5-year terms	Prime Minister	No directly set terms; however, they must maintain the support of the Sabor, which has a term of four years.
Cyprus	President	Two consecutive 5-year terms (since 2019 constitutional reform)		
Czech Republic	President	Two consecutive 5-year terms	Prime Minister	No directly set terms; however, they have to maintain the support of the Chamber of Deputies, which has a term of four years.
Czech Republic	President	Two consecutive 5-year terms	Deputies	Unlimited 4-year terms
Czech Republic	President	Two consecutive 5-year terms	Senators	Unlimited 6-year terms
Denmark	King / Queen	No set terms (hereditary succession)	Prime Minister	No directly set terms; however, they must maintain the support of the Folketing, which has a term of four years.
Estonia	President	Two 5-year terms	Prime Minister	No directly set terms; however, they must maintain the support of the Riigikogu, which has a term of four years.
European Union	President of the European Council	Two 2.5-year terms	President of the European Commission	Unlimited 5-year terms
Finland	President	Two consecutive 6-year terms	Prime Minister	No directly set terms; however, they must maintain the support of the Parliament, which has a term of four years.
France (main article)	President	Two consecutive 5-year terms (since 2008 constitutional reform)	Prime Minister	No directly set terms; however, they must maintain the support of the National Assembly, which has a term of five years.
Georgia	President	Two 5-year terms	Prime Minister	No directly set terms; however, they must maintain the support of the Parliament, which has a term of four years.
Germany	President	Two consecutive 5-year terms	Chancellor	No directly set terms; however, they must maintain the support of the Bundestag, which has a term of four years.
Greece	President	Two 5-year terms	Prime Minister	No directly set terms; however, they must maintain the support of the Hellenic Parliament, which has a term of four years.
Hungary	President	Two 5-year terms	Prime Minister	8-year term limit (equivalent to two 4-year terms) and they must maintain the support of the National Assembly, which has a term of four years.
Iceland	President	Unlimited 4-year terms	Prime Minister	No directly set terms; however, they must maintain the support of the Althing, which has a term of four years.
Ireland	President	Two 7-year terms	Taoiseach (equivalent of Prime Minister)	No directly set terms; however, they must maintain the support of the Dáil, which has a term of five years.
Italy	President	Unlimited 7-year terms	Prime Minister	No directly set terms; however, they must maintain the support of both Houses of the Parliament, which have a term of five years.
Kazakhstan	President	One 7-year term		
Kosovo	President	Two 5-year terms	Prime Minister	No directly set terms; however, they must maintain the support of the Assembly, which has a term of four years.
Latvia	President	Two 4-year terms	Prime Minister	No directly set terms; however, they must maintain the support of the Saeima, which has a term of four years.
Liechtenstein	Prince	No set terms (hereditary succession)	Prime Minister	No directly set terms; however, they must maintain the support of the Landtag, which has a term of four years.
Lithuania	President	Two 5-year terms	Prime Minister	No directly set terms; however, they must maintain the support of the Seimas, which has a term of four years.
Luxembourg	Grand Duke / Grand Duchess	No set terms (hereditary succession)	Prime Minister	No directly set terms; however, they must maintain the support of the Chamber of Deputies, which has a term of five years.
Malta	President	One 5-year term	Prime Minister	No directly set terms; however, they must maintain the support of the Parliament, which has a term of five years.
Moldova	President	Two consecutive 4-year terms	Prime Minister	No directly set terms; however, they must maintain the support of the Parliament, which has a term of four years.
Monaco	Prince / Princess	No set terms (hereditary succession)	Minister of State	No directly set terms; appointed by the Prince.
Montenegro	President	Two 5-year terms	Prime Minister	No directly set terms; however, they must maintain the support of the Parliament, which has a term of four years.
Netherlands	King / Queen	No set terms (hereditary succession)	Prime Minister	Unlimited 4-year terms
North Macedonia	President	Two 5-year terms	Prime Minister	No directly set terms; however, they must maintain the support of the Assembly of North Macedonia, which has a term of four years.
Norway	King / Queen	No set terms (hereditary succession)	Prime Minister	No directly set terms; however, they must maintain the support of the Storting, which has a term of four years.
Poland	President	Two 5-year terms	Prime Minister	No directly set terms; however, they must maintain the support of the Sejm, which has a term of four years.
Portugal	President	Two consecutive 5-year terms	Prime Minister	No directly set terms; however, they must maintain the support of the Assembly of the Republic, which has a term of less than four years.
Romania	President	Two 5-year terms	Prime Minister	No directly set terms; however, they must maintain the support of the Chamber of Deputies, as well as the support of the Senate, both of which have a term of less than four years.
Russia	President	Two 6-year terms	Prime Minister	No directly set terms; however, they must maintain the support of the President, who has a term of six years, as well as the support of the State Duma, which has a term of five years.
San Marino	Captains Regent	Unlimited non-consecutive 6-month terms, but an outgoing Captain Regent cannot be re-elected for three years.		
Serbia	President	Two 5-year terms	Prime Minister	No directly set terms; however, they must maintain the support of the National Assembly, which has a term of four years.
Slovakia	President	Two consecutive 5-year terms	Prime Minister	No directly set terms; however, they must maintain the support of the National Council, which has a term of four years.
Slovenia	President	Two 5-year terms	Prime Minister	No directly set terms; however, they must maintain the support of the National Assembly, which has a term of four years.
Spain	King / Queen	No set terms (hereditary succession)	Prime Minister	No directly set terms; however, they must maintain the support of the Congress of Deputies, which has a term of four years.
Sweden	King / Queen	No set terms (hereditary succession)	Prime Minister	No directly set terms; however, they must maintain the support of the Riksdag, which has a term of four years.
Switzerland	President of the Confederation	Unlimited non-consecutive 1-year terms	Members of the Federal Council	Unlimited 4-year terms
Turkey	President	Two 5-year terms	Members of the Grand National Assembly of Turkey	Unlimited 5-year terms
United Kingdom	King / Queen	No set terms (hereditary succession)	Prime Minister	No directly set terms; however, they must maintain the support of the House of Commons, which has a term of five years.
Ukraine	President	Two consecutive 5-year terms	Prime Minister	No directly set terms; however, they must maintain the support of the Verkhovna Rada, which has a term of five years.

== Oceania ==
Country	Head of state		Head of government (if effectively supreme to a separate head of state) and other offices	
Country	Title	Maximum number of terms	Office	Maximum number of terms
Australia	King / Queen	No set terms (hereditary succession)	Prime Minister	No directly set terms; however, they must maintain the support of the House of Representatives, which has a term of three years.
Australia	Governor-General	No term limits, but traditionally serves for one 5-year term.	Prime Minister	No directly set terms; however, they must maintain the support of the House of Representatives, which has a term of three years.
Federated States of Micronesia	President	Two 4-year terms	Vice President	Two 4-year terms
Fiji	President	Two 3-year terms	Prime Minister	Unlimited 4-year terms
Kiribati	President	Three 4-year terms	Vice President	Three 4-year terms
Marshall Islands	President	Two 4-year terms		
Nauru	President	Two 3-year terms		
New Zealand	King / Queen	No set terms (hereditary succession)	Prime Minister	No directly set terms; however, they must maintain the support of the House of Representatives, which has a term of three years.
New Zealand	Governor-General	No term limits, but traditionally serves for one 5-year term.	Prime Minister	No directly set terms; however, they must maintain the support of the House of Representatives, which has a term of three years.
Palau	President	Two 4-year terms	Vice President	Two 4-year terms
Papua New Guinea	King / Queen	No set terms (hereditary succession)	Prime Minister	No directly set terms; however, they must maintain the support of the National Parliament, which has a term of five years.
Papua New Guinea	Governor-General	Two 6-year terms	Prime Minister	No directly set terms; however, they must maintain the support of the National Parliament, which has a term of five years.
Samoa	Chief of State	Two 5-year terms	Prime Minister	Unlimited 5-year terms
Solomon Islands	King / Queen	No set terms (hereditary succession)	Prime Minister	No directly set terms; however, they must maintain the support of the National Parliament, which has a term of four years.
Solomon Islands	Governor-General	Two 5-year terms	Prime Minister	No directly set terms; however, they must maintain the support of the National Parliament, which has a term of four years.
Tonga	King / Queen	No set terms (hereditary succession)	Prime Minister	No directly set terms
Tuvalu	King / Queen	No set terms (hereditary succession)	Prime Minister	No directly set terms; however, they must maintain the support of the Parliament, which has a term of four years.
Tuvalu	Governor-General	No set terms; appointed by the monarch on the advice of the Prime Minister.	Prime Minister	No directly set terms; however, they must maintain the support of the Parliament, which has a term of four years.
Vanuatu	President	One 5-year term	Prime Minister	No directly set terms; however, they must maintain the support of the Parliament, which has a term of four years.

== See also ==
- Term limit
- Reelection
- Term of office

== Sources ==
- CIA World Factbook
