= Impeachment in South Korea =

Procedure of accusing a civil officer

In South Korea, the President, the prime minister, members of the State Council, heads of Executive Ministries, Justices of the Constitutional Court, judges, members of the National Election Commission, the Chairperson and members of the Board of Audit and Inspection, and other public officials designated by Act can each be impeached by the National Assembly for violating the Constitution or other Acts in the performance of official duties.

The National Assembly has the exclusive power to initiate impeachment cases. An official is considered impeached when at least half of total number of Assembly members vote in favor of the motion of impeachment, the formal document detailing the charges (however, a two-thirds majority of the total number of Assembly members is required for the impeachment of the President).

When the impeachment bill is passed, the bill is sent to the Constitutional Court which acts as an impeachment court to try the official and determine guilt. If the court votes by a two-thirds majority vote (currently 6 out of 9 justices) to uphold the impeachment motion, the official is removed from office and cannot serve as a public official for 5 years from the date of the impeachment decision.

== Procedure ==
The procedure for impeachment is set out in the Constitution.

=== Impeachable officials and impeachable offenses ===
Article 65 of the Constitution of the Republic of Korea, Clause 1 provides:

In case the President, the prime minister, members of the State Council, heads of Executive Ministries, Justices of the Constitutional Court, judges, members of the National Election Commission, the Chairperson and members of the Board of Audit and Inspection, and other public officials designated by Act have violated the Constitution or other Acts in the performance of official duties, the National Assembly may pass motions for their impeachment.

=== Passage by National Assembly ===
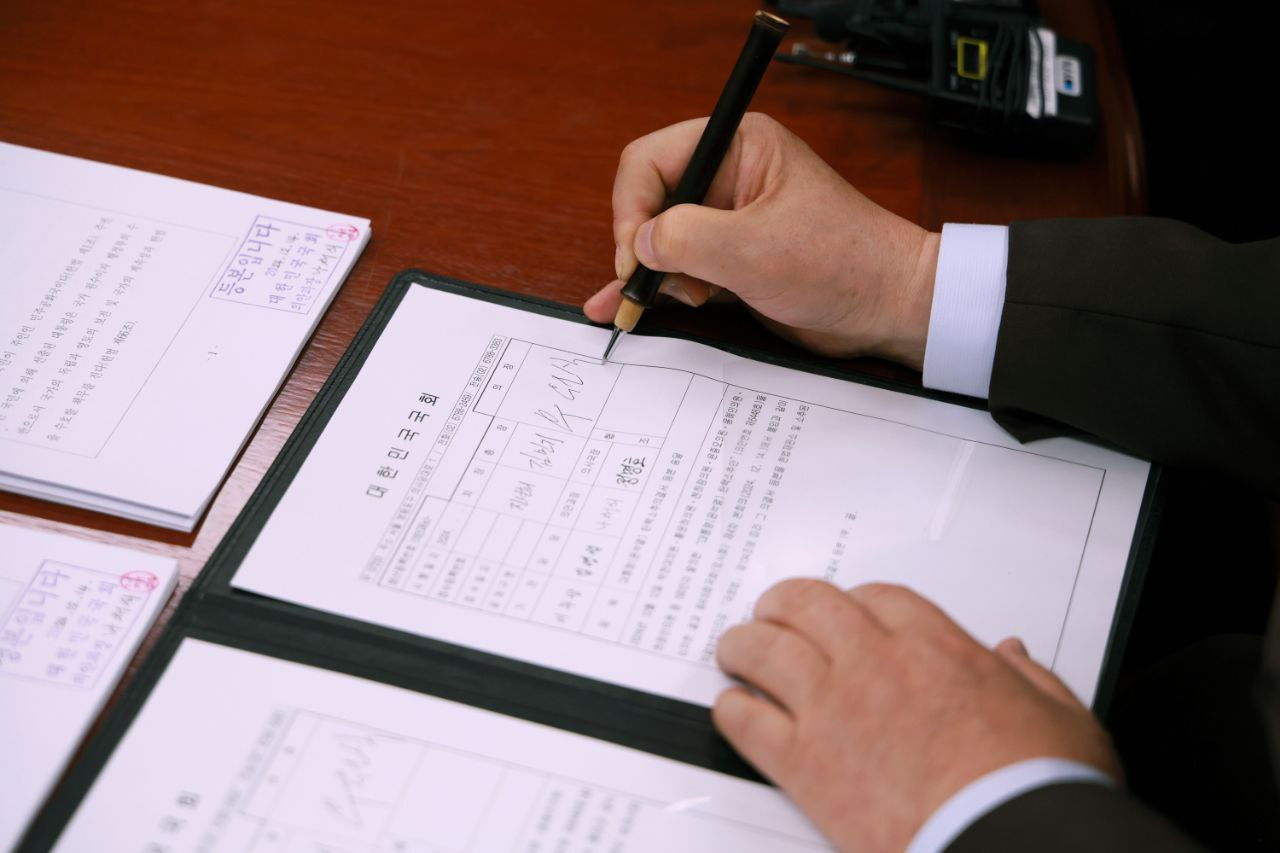
Speaker of the National Assembly Woo Won-shik signing the impeachment resolution of President Yoon Suk Yeol after its passage in the National Assembly, 14 December 2024

Article 65 of the Constitution of the Republic of Korea, Clause 2 provides:

A motion for impeachment prescribed in paragraph (1) may be proposed by one third or more of the total members of the National Assembly, and shall require a concurrent vote of a majority of the total members of the National Assembly for passage: Provided, That a motion for the impeachment of the President shall be proposed by a majority of the total members of the National Assembly and approved by two thirds or more of the total members of the National Assembly.

In the case of the impeachment of Han Duck-soo, the Prime Minister, who was also the acting President following Yoon Suk Yeol's impeachment, there was a debate whether Han, as an acting president, could only be impeached with a two-thirds requirement like the President or via an absolute majority of Assembly members (as he was still the Prime Minister). The Constitutional Court ruled 6-2 on 10 April 2025 that the requirements for Han to be impeached as a cabinet minister rather than as president under the guidelines set by the Speaker of the National Assembly did not violate the constitution.

=== Suspension of impeached official from office ===
A successful impeachment vote is followed by suspension of duties, while an impeachment trial in the Constitutional Court takes place.

Article 65 of the Constitution of the Republic of Korea, Clause 3 provides:

Any person against whom a motion for impeachment has been passed shall be suspended from exercising his/her power until the impeachment has been adjudicated.

Article 65 of the Constitution of the Republic of Korea, Clause 4 provides:

A decision on impeachment shall not extend further than removal from public office: Provided, That it shall not exempt the person impeached from civil or criminal liability.

=== Constitutional Court impeachment trial ===
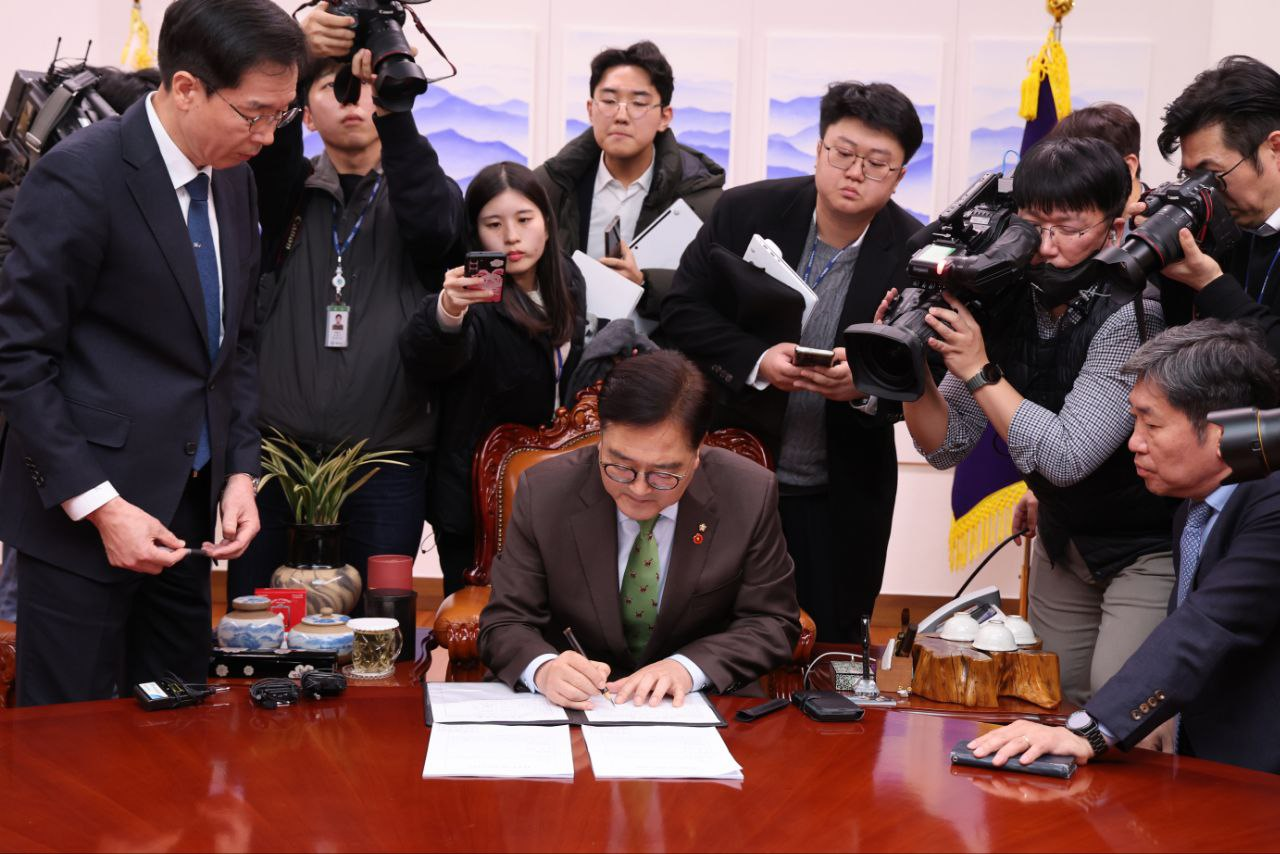
Speaker of the National Assembly Woo Won-shik signing the impeachment resolution of President Yoon Suk Yeol for its transmission to the Constitutional Court, after its passage in the National Assembly, 14 December 2024

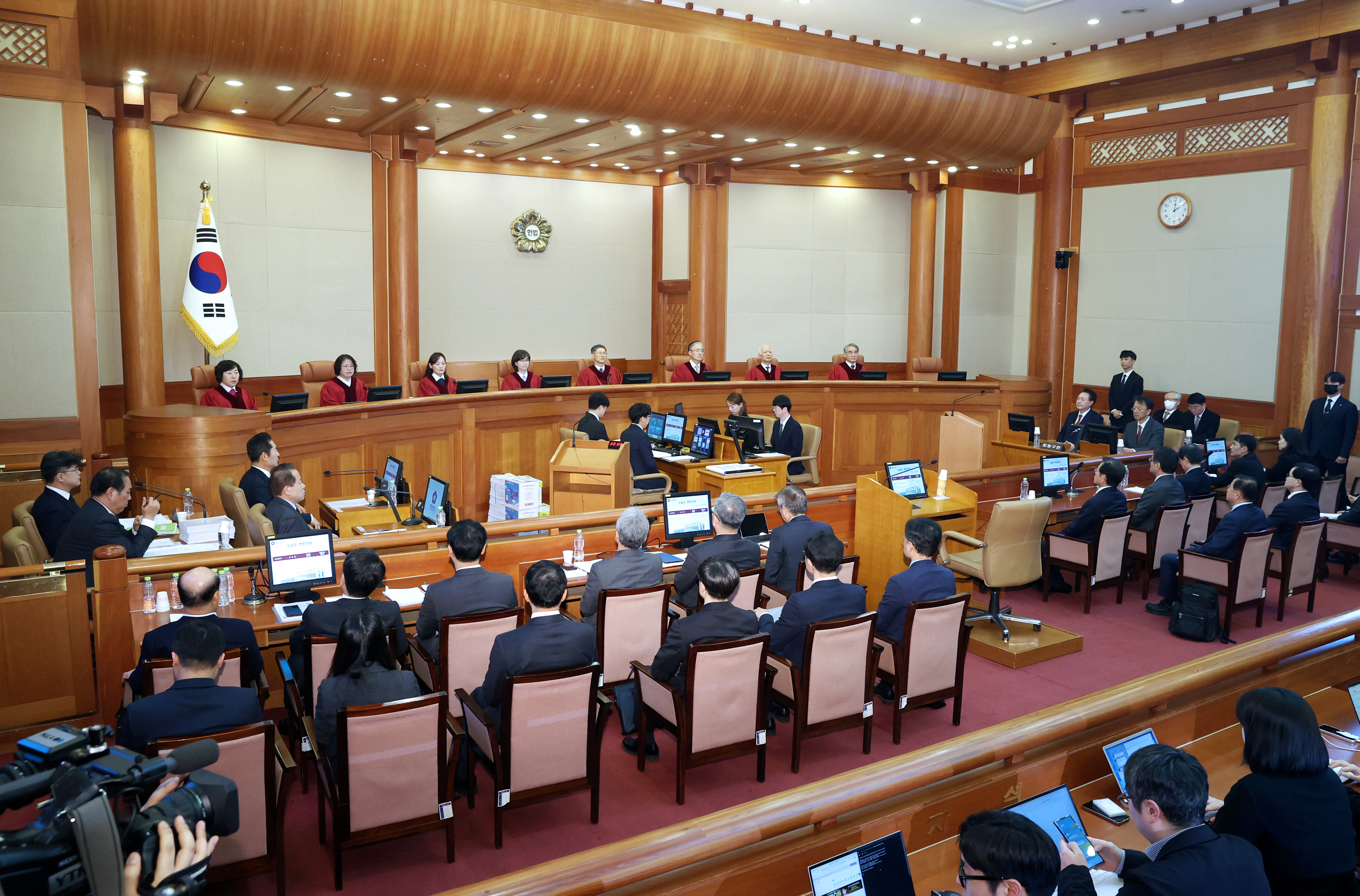
The Constitutional Court holding a hearing in the impeachment trial for President Yoon Suk Yeol, with Yoon in attendance (on the right) as the defendant, January 21, 2025.

The Speaker of the National Assembly will be required to send the original copy of the impeachment bill immediately to the Chair of the Legislation and Judiciary Committee of the National Assembly, who serves as the impeachment prosecutor. The impeachment prosecutor shall request adjudication by presenting the bill to the Constitutional Court which sits as an impeachment court.

Per the Constitutional Court Act, the Constitutional Court must make a final decision within 180 days after it receives any case for adjudication, including impeachment cases. If the respondent has already left office before the pronouncement of the decision, the case is dismissed.

While precedent exists for the Constitutional Court to hold hearings to address impeachments of lower offices with only six members seated at a time when three of its seats were vacant (set during the impeachment of Lee Jin-sook at her request for proceedings to begin promptly), there is a strict quorum of seven justices needed to be present for the court to hold proceedings on presidential impeachments.

=== Criteria to remove official ===
Neither the constitution nor the Constitutional Court Act provides concrete criteria to be considered in an impeachment case. Therefore, previous Constitutional Court decisions play an important role in establishing standards of review for impeachment cases. In President Roh's impeachment case, the court decided that a grave (중대한) violation of the law is required to remove a president from office. However, in the case of President Park Geun-hye, the Constitutional Court held that a violation of the constitution is sufficient for removal, even without a grave violation of the law or statutes.

=== Constitutional Court verdict ===
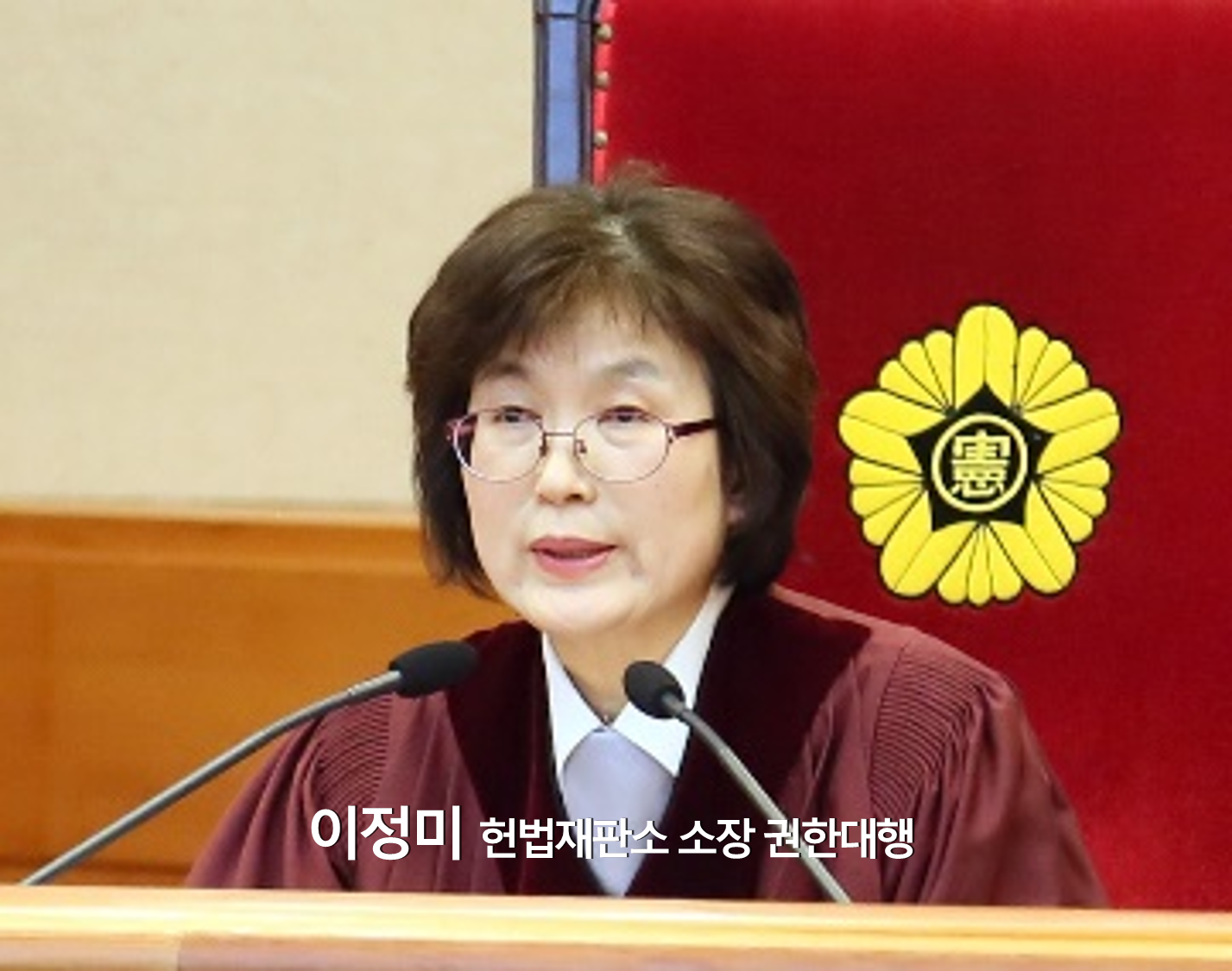
Acting President of the Constitutional Court Lee Jung-mi announcing the court decision removing President Park Geun-hye from office, 10 March 2017

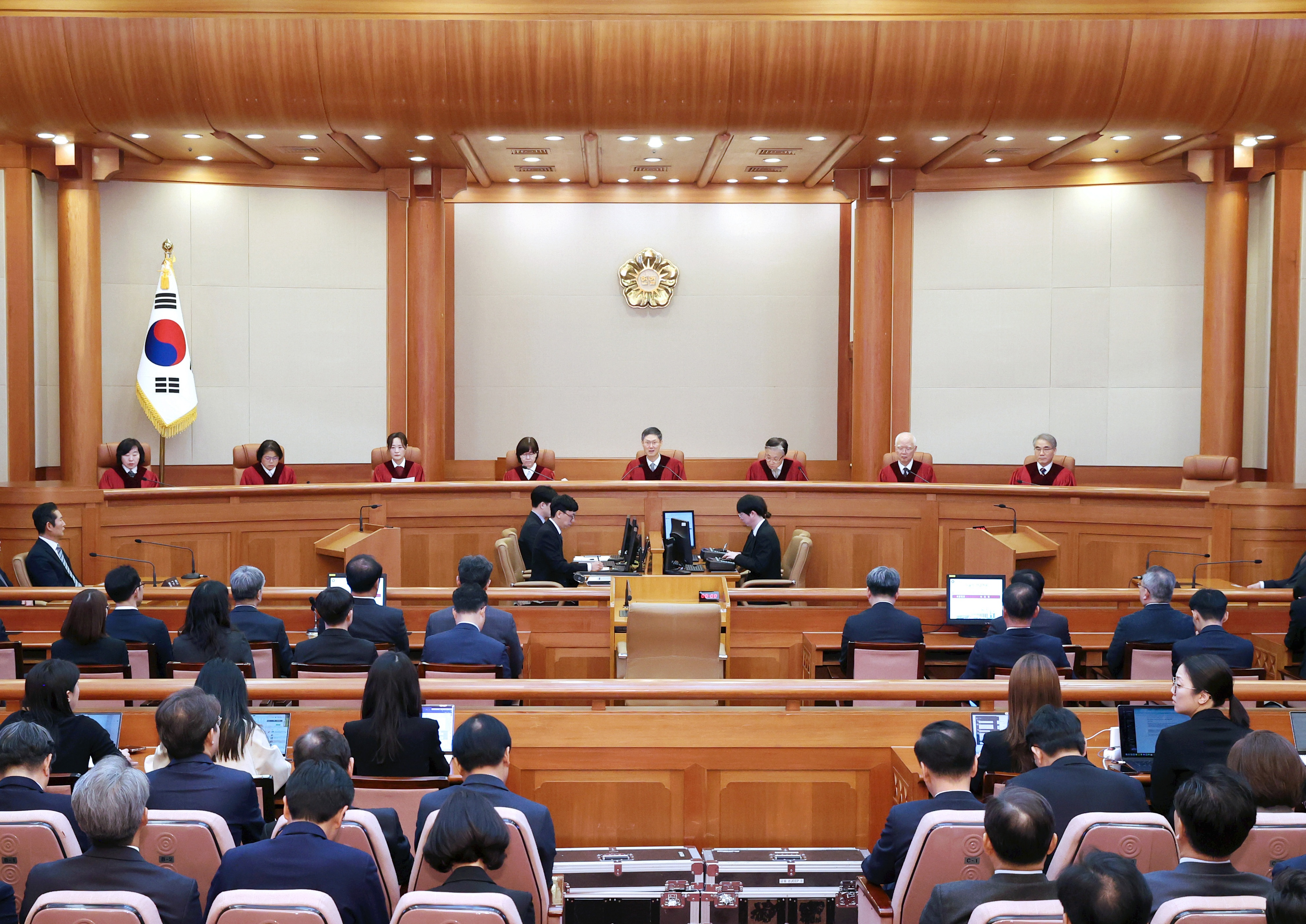
Acting President of the Constitutional Court Moon Hyung-bae (center) announcing the court decision removing President Yoon Suk Yeol from office, 4 April 2025

At least six of the nine Constitutional Court judges must find the impeachment case valid, for the defending official to be removed from office.

Article 113 of the Constitution of the Republic of Korea, Clause 1 provides:

When the Constitutional Court makes a decision of the constitutionality of a law, a decision of impeachment, a decision of dissolution of a political party or an affirmative decision regarding the constitutional complaint, the concurrence of six Justices or more shall be required.

An impeached official cannot serve as a public official for 5 years from the date of the impeachment decision.

If presidents are removed from office, Article 68 Clause 2 of the Constitution states that a successor shall be elected within sixty days in an snap election, which was what happened in 2017 and 2025.

If less than 6 judges agree to uphold the impeachment motion, the case is dismissed and the impeached official is restored to office, resuming his or her duties.

== List of impeachments ==
The National Assembly has approved impeachment motions 16 times for 16 officials. Of these:

- Six were prosecutors.
- Three were sitting presidents.
- One was Prime Minister. (Note: Han Duck-soo was impeached for allegations that took place in his capacity as Acting President)
- Two were ministers of the State Council.
- One was a judge.
- Three were the heads of state agencies.

Of the 16 impeachment motions passed by the National Assembly:

- Three respondents were removed from office after the Constitutional Court of Korea found sufficient grounds to uphold their impeachments.
  - Presidents Park Geun-hye (2017) and Yoon Suk Yeol (2025),
  - National Police Agency Commissioner-General Cho Ji-ho (2025).
- One case was dismissed by the Constitutional Court because the respondent went into retirement and his term of office ended during the trial.
- Twelve ended in acquittal and resulted in the respondent continuing in office.
Blue highlight indicates that the impeached official was removed from office following the Constitutional Court impeachment trial.

No.	Respondent	Position	Accusations	Date of impeachment by National Assembly	National Assembly vote	Constitutional Court judgment	Constitutional Court decision	Constitutional Court vote	Detail
1	Roh Moo-hyun	President of the Republic of Korea	Violating the Public Official Election Act, abetting his close aides’ corruption and failing to address the economic downturn.	12 March 2004	193–2 (Note: Uri Party members abstained from vote)	14 May 2004	Impeachment dismissed	Not disclosed	
2	Park Geun-hye	President of the Republic of Korea	Serious violations of the law via abuse of power, betrayal of the public trust, failure to safeguard and comply with the Constitution (related to the 2016 South Korean political scandal)	9 December 2016	234–56	10 March 2017	Impeachment upheld; respondent removed from office	8–0	(details)
3	Lim Seong-geun	Presiding Judge, Busan High Court	Interference in politically sensitive trials and influencing a libel case	4 February 2021	179–102	28 October 2021	Case dismissed as legally null and void (Respondent had retired from office on 28 February 2021)	5-3 (Note: 5 justices voted to void the impeachment, 3 voted to uphold impeachment and 1 justice argued that the case should not have been heard in the first place.)	
4	Lee Sang-min	Minister of the Interior and Safety	Violated the Constitution and statutes in the performance of official duties in relation to the Itaewon crowd crush	8 February 2023	179–109	25 July 2023	Impeachment dismissed	9-0	
5	Ahn Dong-wan	Deputy Chief Prosecutor, Busan District Prosecutors' Office	Abuse of authority through retaliatory prosecutions	21 September 2023	180–105	30 May 2024	Impeachment dismissed	5–4 (Note: 5 justices voted to dismiss the impeachment motion, 4 voted to uphold impeachment and remove the respondent from office)	
6	Son Jun-sung	Deputy Chief Prosecutor, Daegu High Prosecutors Office	Allegedly conspired to encourage criminal complaints against ruling party figures before the 2020 legislative election	1 December 2023	175–2	17 July 2025	Impeachment dismissed	7–0	
7	Lee Jung-seop	Deputy Chief Prosecutor, Suwon District Prosecutors' Office	Abuse of authority, improper access to criminal records, accepting hospitality, covering up a drug investigation, intervening in a bribery case, and false residence registration	1 December 2023	174–3	29 August 2024	Impeachment dismissed	9-0	
8	Lee Jin-sook	Chair, Korea Communications Commission	Operating the KCC with only two commissioners without a quorum and violating political neutrality	2 August 2024	186–1	23 January 2025	Impeachment dismissed	4–4 (Note: 4 justices voted to dismiss the impeachment motion, 4 voted to uphold impeachment and remove the respondent from office)	
9	Lee Chang-soo	Chief Prosecutor, Seoul Central District Prosecutors' Office	Improperly dropping the First Lady Kim Keon-hee's stock manipulation case and making false public statements related to the investigation	5 December 2024	185–3	13 March 2025	Impeachment dismissed	8–0	
10	Cho Sang-won	Deputy Chief Prosecutor, Seoul Central District Prosecutors' Office	Improperly dropping the First Lady Kim Keon-hee's stock manipulation case and making false public statements related to the investigation	5 December 2024	186–4	13 March 2025	Impeachment dismissed	8–0	
11	Choi Jae-hoon	Head of Anti-Corruption Investigation Division 2, Seoul Central District Prosecutors' Office	Improperly dropping the First Lady Kim Keon-hee's stock manipulation case and making false public statements related to the investigation	5 December 2024	187–4	13 March 2025	Impeachment dismissed	8–0	
12	Choe Jae-hee	Chair, Board of Audit and Inspection	Alleged legal violations in audits concerning the relocation of the presidential office and politically motivated audits of Jeon Hyun-hee, Chair of the Anti-Corruption and Civil Rights Commission	5 December 2024	188–4	13 March 2025	Impeachment dismissed	8–0	
13	Cho Ji-ho	Commissioner General of the National Police Agency	Execution of unconstitutional martial law under the president’s unconstitutional and unlawful orders, abandoning the constitutional duty and responsibility entrusted to the National Police Agency commissioner general, infringing the powers of the National Assembly and National Election Commission, and violating constitutional rights.	12 December 2024	202–88	18 December 2025	Impeachment upheld; respondent removed from office	9–0	
14	Park Sung-jae	Minister of Justice	Aiding the unlawful declaration of Yoon Suk Yeol's martial law and violating the Act on Testimony and Appraisal Before the National Assembly	12 December 2024	195–100	10 April 2025	Impeachment dismissed	8–0	
15	Yoon Suk Yeol	President of the Republic of Korea	Violations of constitutional and statutory requirements in declaring emergency martial law, infringing the powers of the National Assembly, judiciary and National Election Commission, and violating constitutional rights	14 December 2024	204–85	4 April 2025	Impeachment upheld; respondent removed from office	8–0	(details)
16	Han Duck-soo	Prime Minister (in capacity as Acting President)	As Acting President: Dereliction of duty by refusal to promulgate bills for special counsel investigations of President Yoon Suk Yeol and First Lady Kim Keon-hee; and blocking three National Assembly-approved appointments of Constitutional Court justices.	27 December 2024	192–0	24 March 2025	Impeachment dismissed	7–1 (Note: 5 justices voted to dismiss the impeachment motion, 1 voted to uphold impeachment and remove the respondent from office, while remaining 2 justices rejected the impeachment motion entirely on grounds that 200 out of 300 members should be required to impeach Han as per presidential impeachment, as he was executing presidential duties following the impeachment of Yoon Suk Yeol.)	(details)

== List of unsuccessful impeachments ==
Below is an incomplete list of notable impeachment motions that did not pass the National Assembly, including officials who resigned from office before impeachment vote.

Year	Accused	Office	Accusations	Summary
1985	Yoo Tai-heung	Chief Justice of the Supreme Court of Korea	Failing to safeguard the independence of the judiciary	Impeachment motion failed to pass the Assembly: Assemblymen of the opposition New Korean Democratic Party filed an impeachment motion against Yoo for allegedly demoting a judge who pardoned a political prisoner, transferring two Seoul judges who acquitted student demonstrators to provincial positions, while another judge who criticized the assignments in an article published in a law journal was also allegedly reassigned to a remote provincial area a few days later. The National Assembly rejected the motion with only 95 in favor, 146 against, 1 abstention, 5 invalid, on 21 October 1985. This was the first ever attempt to impeach a public official in South Korean history.
1994	Kim Do-eon	Prosecutor General of South Korea	Suspending the indictment of 34 people who plotted in advance or actively participated in the coup d'état of December Twelfth, and deciding not to prosecute for 4 people who participated after the fact or had lesser charges.	Impeachment motion failed to pass the Assembly: Opposition assemblymen filed an impeachment motion against Kim for suspending the indictment of 34 people involved in the 1979 coup that brought Chun Doo-hwan to power, just as the statute of limitations was expiring. The National Assembly rejected the motion with only 88 in favor, 158 against, 1 abstention, 2 invalid, on 19 December 1994. This was the second ever attempt to impeach a public official in South Korean history.
2020	Choo Mi-ae	Minister of Justice	Abuse of power	Impeachment motion failed to pass the Assembly: On July 20, 2020, the opposition United Future Party and People Party submitted an impeachment bill against Choo for abuse of power. On 23 July, the impeachment attempt against Choo failed at 109 votes in favour, 179 votes against, and 4 invalid votes
2024	Kim Yong-hyun	Minister of National Defense	Recommending that President Yoon Suk Yeol impose martial law	Official resigned before impeachment vote: The Democratic Party filed a motion to impeach Kim on December 4 2024, one day after Yoon's failed illegal martial law declaration. Kim resigned his position on 5 December. Accordingly, no voting was conducted and the vote was automatically discarded.
2024	Yoon Suk Yeol	President of the Republic of Korea	Illegal declaration of martial law and insurrection	Impeachment vote failed to meet quorum: On 7 December 2024, the first attempt to impeach Yoon after the 2024 martial law declaration failed after only 195 lawmakers of the 200 needed to impeach attended, following a boycott by all but three MPs from the PPP. (The second vote that took place on 14 December would see Yoon impeached.)
2024	Lee Sang-min	Minister of the Interior and Safety	Conspiring to plan the illegal martial law declaration of President Yoon Suk Yeol, distorting the proceedings of a Cabinet meeting to approve such a matter and defending the illegal martial law	Official resigned before impeachment vote: The Democratic Party filed another motion to impeach Lee on December 7 2024, this time for colluding with Yoon's illegal martial law declaration. One day before the Assembly was set to vote on the motion on 9 December, Lee resigned his position on 8 December and thus the motion was withdrawn.
2025	Choi Sang-mok	Deputy Prime Minister and Minister of Economy and Finance (in capacity as Acting President)	Violated the Constitution with refusal to appoint justice Ma Eunhyeok to the Constitutional Court and judge Ma Yong-joo to the Supreme Court of Korea while serving as Acting President despite the confirmation of both judges by the National Assembly, abetting Yoon's martial law declaration in December 2024, failing to appoint a National Assembly-backed special counsel to investigate the 2024 martial law declaration	Official resigned before impeachment vote: On 21 March 2025, the Democratic Party and four other opposition parties submitted a motion in the National Assembly to impeach Choi, citing his refusal to exercise his powers as acting president to appoint justice Ma Eunhyeok to the Constitutional Court and judge Ma Yong-joo to the Supreme Court. The petitioners also charged Choi with abetting Yoon's martial law declaration in December 2024 and failing to appoint a National Assembly-backed special counsel to look into possible insurrection by Yoon despite the legislature passing a resolution to do so. Despite Choi reverting to his previous position as Finance Minister after Han Duck-soo retook the Acting President's position following the acquittal by the Constitutional Court, the Democratic Party continued with presenting the impeachment motion and reporting the bill to the plenary of the National Assembly on 2 April 2025. The National Assembly, in a surprise move, fast-tracked the impeachment motion directly to the floor on May 1, hours before Choi was to resume as acting President at midnight following the imminent resignation of Prime Minister Han Duck-soo to run for president. Minutes before the chamber was set to vote on the motion, Choi resigned at 10.28pm, thus Speaker Woo Won-shik announced the suspension of the proceedings.
2025	Shim Woo-jung	Prosecutor General of South Korea	Colluding with President Yoon Suk Yeol's illegal martial law declaration.	Official resigned before impeachment vote: In May 2025, the Democratic Party submitted an impeachment motion against Shim, to the plenary session of the National Assembly over his alleged role in Yoon’s failed martial law bid on 3 December 2024, accusing Shim of colluding with Yoon in the martial law debacle. Shim resigned as Prosecutor General in July 2025, thus the motion never came to a vote.
