= Term limits in France =

Term limits of French office holders

Term limits in France are limitations on how many times an officeholder may hold a specific office in France.

The first term limits in modern times were established in the French First Republic by the Constitution of 1795. Under this constitution, members of the French Directory were not permitted to serve consecutive terms. These limits existed until the republic was overthrown by Napoleon in 1799. Term limits were reestablished in the French Second Republic by the French Constitution of 1848 and lasted until the republic was overthrown by Napoleon III in 1852.

There were no presidential term limits in the French Third Republic or the French Fourth Republic. The President of France did not have term limits in the current French Fifth Republic until the Constitution of France was amended in 2008, limiting the president to two consecutive 5 year terms.

Sages of the Constitutional Council are restricted to a single nine-year term. An exception is permitted if a sage dies, in which case a replacement may finish the previous term before serving a full term.

The Prime Minister of France is not restricted by terms, instead holding office so long as support of the National Assembly is maintained.

== See also ==
- List of political term limits
