= 1962 South Korean constitutional referendum =

- 17 December 1962

Results
Choice	Votes	%
Yes	8,339,333	80.59%
No	2,008,801	19.41%
Valid votes	10,348,134	97.75%
Invalid or blank votes	237,864	2.25%
Total votes	10,585,998	100.00%
Registered voters/turnout	12,412,798	85.28%

A constitutional referendum was held in South Korea on 17 December 1962. The new constitution was approved by 80.6% of voters, with a turnout of 85.3%.

== Results ==
Choice	Votes	%
For	8,339,333	80.6
Against	2,008,801	19.4
Invalid/blank votes	237,864	–
Total	10,585,998	100
Registered voters/turnout	12,412,798	85.1
Source: Nohlen et al.
