= 1969 South Korean constitutional referendum =

- 17 October 1969

Results
Choice	Votes	%
Yes	7,553,655	67.50%
No	3,636,369	32.50%
Valid votes	11,190,024	96.43%
Invalid or blank votes	414,014	3.57%
Total votes	11,604,038	100.00%
Registered voters/turnout	15,048,925	77.11%
- Results by province

A constitutional referendum was held in South Korea on 17 October 1969. The changes to the constitution were approved by 67.5% of valid ballots, with a turnout of 77%.

== Results ==
Choice	Votes	%
For	7,553,655	67.50
Against	3,636,369	32.50
Total	11,190,024	100.00
Valid votes	11,190,024	96.43
Invalid/blank votes	414,014	3.57
Total votes	11,604,038	100.00
Registered voters/turnout	15,048,925	77.11
Source: Nohlen et al.
