= Term limits in the Philippines =

Term limits in the Philippines are limitations to how long an officeholder may specific government office in the Philippines. The president of the Philippines is limited to one six-year term. All elected officials are currently term limited, while some appointed officials that have specific terms of office also have term limits.

== Presidential term limits ==
The president of the Philippines was instituted by the 1935 constitution. As originally written, the president had one six-year term with no reelection. An amendment approved by a plebiscite in 1940 allowed the president to be reelected, but on a four-year term; an additional provision was the president was only able to serve up to a maximum of eight years. President Manuel L. Quezon, who was first elected in 1935, was indeed reelected in 1941. World War II intervened and saw the Commonwealth of the Philippines establish a government-in-exile in Washington, D.C. Here, the United States Congress passed a resolution authorizing Quezon (and the rest of the government) to stay in office until a proclamation by the president of the United States of the restoration of constitutional processes and normal government functions in the Philippines. Quezon died in 1944 and was succeeded by Sergio Osmeña.

With the 1935 constitution as amended still in effect, and faced with rising unrest, president Ferdinand Marcos (then serving his second term) declared martial law with Proclamation No. 1081 in September 1972, thereby extending his presidency indefinitely. A January 1973 plebiscite approved a new constitution and abolished term limits for the president.

After Marcos was overthrown in the People Power Revolution, the 1987 constitution was created, mandating that the president has a six-year term and cannot be reelected. The first president who served under the 1987 constitution, Corazon Aquino, was advised by her advisers that since she ascended into power under the 1973 constitution, this provision did not apply to her, and was thus was able to run for president in the 1992 election. Aquino ultimately did not run.

The 1987 constitution also had an added provision, where a president who has already served for more than four years of a term that someone else was elected to, be ineligible for reelection. This benefitted Gloria Macapagal Arroyo, who was able to run for president in 2004 in her own right after succeeding Joseph Estrada on the heels of the Second EDSA Revolution.

== Vice presidential term limits ==
The vice president under the 1935 constitution was to serve for a four-year term, and had no term limits. Fernando Lopez was the only vice president to be re-elected, in 1969.

Under the 1987 constitution, a vice president has a six-year term and may be re-elected once.

== Congressional term limits ==
In the Philippine Organic Act of 1902, members of the Philippine Assembly had three-year terms with no term limits. The Jones Law enacted in 1916 kept this provision, while the newly created Senate had six-year terns with also no term limits.

In the 1935 constitution, the members of the National Assembly were originally given three-year terms with no term limits. With the same 1940 plebiscite allowing presidential reelection, it also restored bicameralism with the inauguration of Congress, which gave senators six-year terms, and House representatives four-year terms. There were still no term limits.

The 1973 constitution gave members of the Batasang Pambansa a six-year term, with still no term limits.

The 1987 constitution gave senators six-year terms with one reelection, and House representatives three-year terms with two reelections.

== Term limits of local officials ==
From 1955, when local officials were first directly elected, up to the enactment of the Local Government Code of 1991, local officials had four-year terms with unlimited reelection.

Officials elected under the Local Government Code of 1991 have three-year terms with up to two reelections. The Bangsamoro Parliament, which is governed by the Bangsamoro Organic Law, also has a three-year term with up to two reelections.

== Exceptions ==
=== Special and recall elections ===
Local officials elected via recall elections can be reelected three times, as the first election was not for a full term. This was first decided on the case of Ding Roman, who won the 1993 Bataan gubernatorial recall election, then was reelected in 1995, 1998 and 2001. In the 2001 election, he faced disqualification suits as he had already served at least parts of three terms. The Supreme Court ruled that his 2001 reelection was valid.

On the same decision that confirmed Roman's candidacy, the Supreme Court clarified that in cases of special elections, the term won during the special election counts as the first term, and a legislator can only be reelected twice (House representative) or once (senator).

Another instance was of Edward Hagedorn's.He won the 2002 Puerto Princesa mayoral recall election, then won in the 2004 and 2007 elections. Hagedorn faced disqualification cases when he ran in 2010; the Commission on Elections allowed Hagedorn to defend the mayoralty.

Deputies of local executives (vice governors and vice mayors) who succeeded mayors can still be elected into office three times if they choose to defend the seat.

=== Involuntary breaks during a term ===
Involuntary delays in the assumption of office and suspensions mid-tern may allow officials to seek another term. In the case of Representative Raymond Mendoza of the Trade Union Congress Party (TUCP), his first term, which started in 2007, was delayed to 2009 when the Supreme Court proclaimed the TUCP as a winning party. TUCP won in 2010, and Mendoza served his first full term. In the 2013 and 2016 elections, TUCP was plagued by infighting within the party, which delayed their proclamation as winners by the Commission on Elections; Mendoza was only able to assume office past June 30, when the terms started. In 2019 and 2022 elections, Mendoza served his terms in full.

In 2010, the Commission on Elections dismissed petitions seeking to disqualify Joseph Estrada to run for president. Estrada was ousted in 2001 after the Second EDSA Revolution, was convicted for plunder, then was granted executive clemency by Gloria Macapagal Arroyo, his successor. Estrada cited the facts that he was not the incumbent president, and that he did not finish the six-year term, thus allowing him to run.

In 2019, Koko Pimentel faced quo warranto petitions on his plans to defend his seat in that year's election. In 2020, the Senate Electoral Tribunal ruled in favor of Pimentel, ruling that his assumption to office in 2011 after winning his election protest against Migz Zubiri, did not count as one full term, and that Pimentel was still eligible for relection in 2019.

== Appointed officials ==
While most appointments by the executive last for the president's pleasure, some offices, to maintain impartiality, have set terms of offices and term limits.

Members of the judiciary are appointed up to a mandatory retirement age of 70.

The members of constitutional commissions (Commission on Audit, Commission on Elections and the Civil Service Commission), and the Commission of Human Rights (CHR) have seven-year terms. The first batch of constitutional commission members had their terms staggered. The terms of constitutional commission members and of the CHR start on February 2, and since members are not always appointed on this date, most do not serve the full seven years. These members cannot be reappointed where their tenure will be more than seven years.

The ombudsman has a term that lasts seven years, starting on the appointment date and ends seven years later, cannot be reappointed, and is expected to complete a term unless removed from office.

In the 1935 constitution, the members of the Commission on Elections and the Auditor General (forerunner of the Commission on Audit) had ten-year terms and cannot be reappointed.

The regular members of the Judicial and Bar Council have four-year terms and can be reappointed multiple times. The first batch of members had their terms staggered. Terms start on July 9, and since members are not always appointed on this date, most do not serve the full four years.

The governor of the Bangko Sentral ng Pilipinas has a six-year term and can be reappointed once.

The Chief of the Philippine National Police cannot serve for more than four years, unless "in times of war or other national emergency declared by Congress." Otherwise, the chief, and indeed all members of the Philippine National Police has the mandatory retirement age of 56.

The Chief of Staff of the Armed Forces of the Philippines, vice chief of staff, the deputy chief of staff, the major service commanders (Philippine Army, Philippine Air Force, Philippine Navy), unified command commanders, and inspector general have a term of three years, but can be extended "in times of war or other national emergency declared by Congress."

== Attempts to remove term limits after 1987 ==
After the election of Bongbong Marcos in 2022, Senator Robin Padilla filed motions to amend the constitution allowing the president to be elected once, with the terms shortened to four years, with senators elected at-large having eight-year terms, then senators elected regionally having four-year terms, but can only have three consecutive terms. Meanwhile, a separate proposal from Representative Aurelio Gonzales Jr., seeks to have the president a five-year term with one reelection.

Proposals for removal of term limits are frowned upon due to past experiences with president Ferdinand Marcos ruling the country for twenty years after abolishing term limits.

== List ==
=== Elected offices ===
Office	Term of office (years)	Total reelections	Term begins/ends
President	6	0	June 30
Vice president	6	1	June 30
Senator	6	1	June 30
House representative	3	2	June 30
Wa'lī	6	0	Date of swearing in
Bangsamoro Parliament member	3	2	Date of swearing in
Governor	3	2	June 30
Vice governor	3	2	June 30
Board member	3	2	June 30
Mayor	3	2	June 30
Vice mayor	3	2	June 30
Councilor	3	2	June 30
Barangay captain	4	2	December 1
Barangay councilor	4	2	December 1
Sangguniang Kabataan president	4	0	December 1
Sangguniang Kabataan member	4	0	December 1

=== Appointed offices ===
Office	Term of office (years)	Total reappointments	Term begins/ends
Constitutional commission member	7	0	February 2
Commission on Human Rights member	7	0	May 5
Ombudsman	7	0	Date of appointment
Judicial and Bar Council regular member	4	Unlimited	February 2
Governor of the Bangko Sentral ng Pilipinas	6	1	July 3
