= Ma Eunhyeok =

South Korean judge

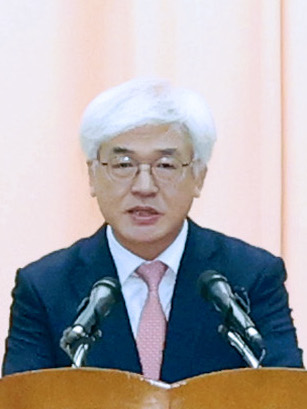
- Ma in 2025

Justice of the Constitutional Court of Korea
- Incumbent
- Assumed office April 9, 2025

Personal details
- Education: Seoul National University

Ma Eunhyeok (Korean: 마은혁) is a South Korean judge. He is currently a justice of the Constitutional Court of Korea.

== Biography ==
Ma obtained a political science degree from Seoul National University. He passed the bar exam in 1997.

In February 2025, the Constitutional Court ruled that the selective appointment of two other justices nominated by the National Assembly to the Constitutional Court, but not Ma was a violation of the National Assembly's rights. The court also ruled that the National Assembly could not mandate Coi Sang-meok to immediately appoint Ma to the court. Ma was started a six-year term to the Constitutional Court on April 9, 2025. Before Ma started his term, the Constitutional Court was short one Justice for six months.

Ma was one of the three nominees for Justice of the Constitutional Court that were endorsed on December 26, 2024, but the acting presidents that followed Yoon Suk Yeol's impeachment refused to give more than a 100-day appointment because the membership of the Constitutional Court could affect the impeachment trial of Yoon due to six votes being needed for an impeachment motion.
