= Constitution of South Korea =

Constitution of the Republic of Korea
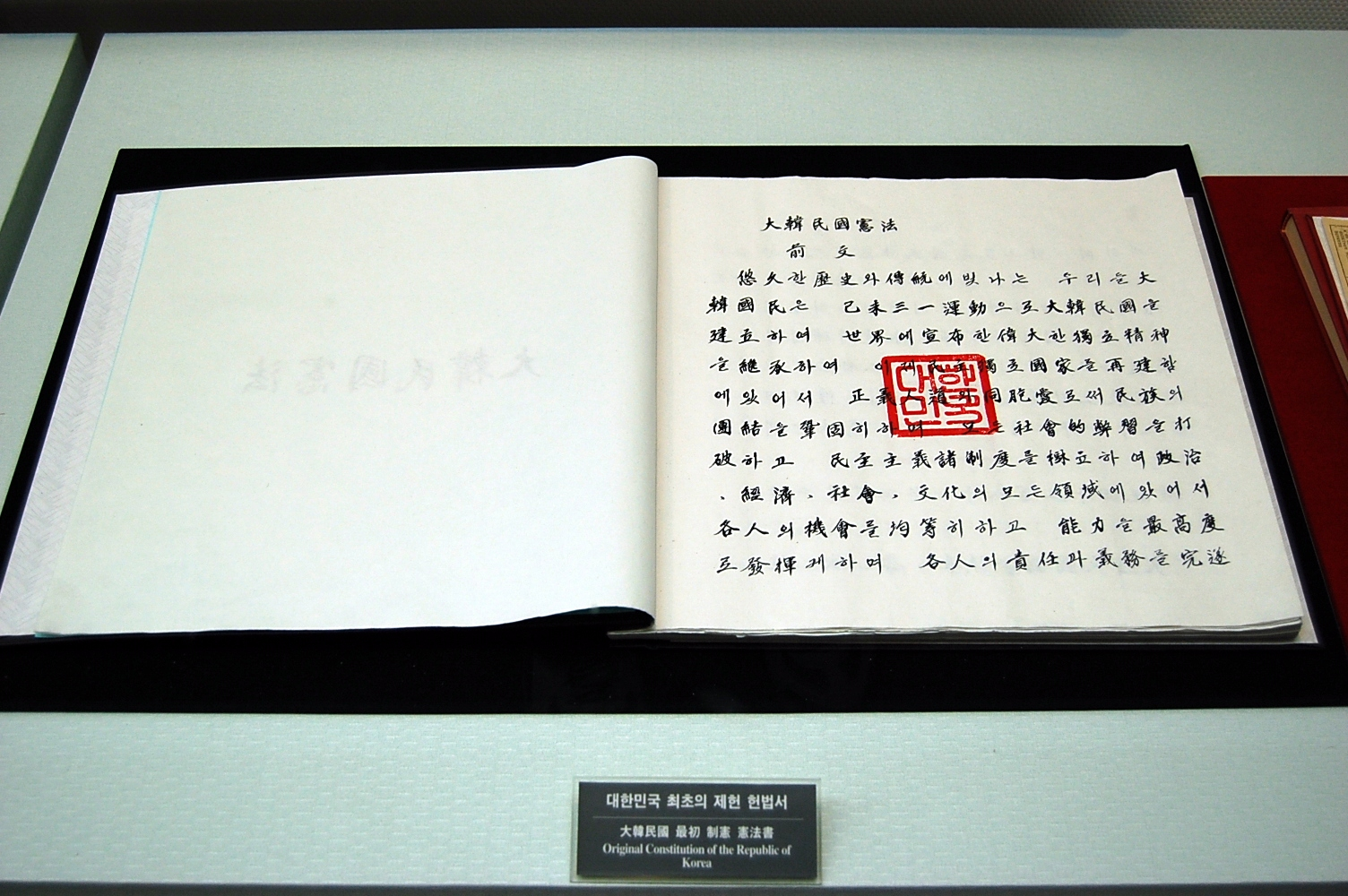
- Preamble of the first version of the Constitution

Overview
- Original title: 대한민국 헌법 (Hangul) 大韓民國憲法 (Hanja)
- Jurisdiction: Korea
- Ratified: 12 July 1948
- Date effective: 17 July 1948
- System: Unitary presidential republic

Government structure
- Branches: Three
- Head of state: President
- Chambers: Unicameral (National Assembly)
- Executive: President, Prime Minister, and State Council
- Judiciary: Supreme Court; Constitutional Court
- Federalism: Unitary
- Electoral college: None

History
- First legislature: 10 May 1948
- First executive: 24 July 1948
- First court: 5 August 1948
- Amendments: 9
- Last amended: 29 October 1987
- Location: War Memorial of Korea, Seoul
- Commissioned by: Constituent National Assembly
- Author: Jo So-ang
- Signatories: Speaker Syngman Rhee, in Seoul
- Supersedes: Provisional Constitution of the Republic of Korea

Full text
- Constitution of South Korea at Wikisource

- Constitution of the Republic of Korea
- Hangul: 대한민국 헌법
- Hanja: 大韓民國憲法
- RR: Daehanminguk heonbeop
- MR: Taehanmin'guk hŏnpŏp

The Constitution of the Republic of Korea is the supreme law of South Korea. It was promulgated on 17 July 1948, and was amended nine times with the last revision of the constitution amended on 29 October 1987.

The constitution consists of ten chapters and 130 articles and codifies South Korea's basic principles on politics, economy, culture and national defense, the basic rights and duties of the country's citizens, the organization of the South Korean government and the country's national symbols.

While South Korean constitution is basically an example of written constitution, some of its enforceable constitutional laws are existing in format of unwritten constitution, when recognized by decisions of the Constitutional Court of Korea. Most prominent example of such unwritten elements is customary constitution identifying Seoul as sole national capital city.

== Background ==
=== The Provisional Charter of Korea ===
The preamble of the Constitution of South Korea states that the document was established in the spirit of "upholding the cause of the Provisional Republic of Korea Government", the Korean government exiled after the imposition of Japanese colonial rule of Korea. As such, the founding document of the provisional government—The Provisional Charter of Korea—serves as the basis for the current constitution. Promulgated in 1919, the charter first gave the country the "Republic of Korea" name and laid out the ideas forming the backbone of later South Korean constitutions.

These ten articles are:

1. The Republic of Korea is a democratic republic.
2. The Provisional Government governs the Republic of Korea under resolutions of the Provisional Assembly.
3. All citizens of the Republic of Korea are equal without regard for gender, wealth and stratum.
4. All citizens of the Republic of Korea have freedom of religion, press, publication, association, assembly, petition and personal property.
5. Qualifying citizens of the Republic of Korea have a right to vote and to be elected.
6. Citizens of the Republic of Korea have duties of education, taxation and military service.
7. The Republic of Korea will join the League of Nations in order to exert its founding spirit in the world and to contribute to human culture and peace by the will of God.
8. The Republic of Korea will extend benevolent treatment to the former imperial family.
9. Capital punishment, corporal punishment and licensed prostitution are forbidden.
10. The Provisional Government will convene the National Assembly within 10 years after restoration of territory.

== History ==
South Korea's first 1948 Constitution, drafted by Dr. Chin-O Yu (Korean: 유진오; Hanja: 兪鎭午), framed an assembly-independent republic. It gave the president to act as the head of state, be elected indirectly by the National Assembly, and share executive power with the cabinet. The Constitutional Charter of the Provisional Government of the Republic of Korea of 1919 became the forerunner of 1948 Constitution. In the case of the first constitution, it was stipulated that the Republic of Korea was operated as a presidential system. At first sight, it seemed that the executive power was the most powerful among the executive, judicial, and legislative branches, but the president's term of office was set at four years and the administration's authority was checked by being elected through the National Assembly. In addition, an impeachment court was established as well as a Constitutional Committee to allow the judiciary to check bureaucrats. Through this, a structure that is easy to check between the legislature, the administration, and the judiciary was formed, centering on the head of the administration.

The 1948 Constitution was first amended in 1952 ahead of Syngman Rhee's re-election, providing for direct presidential elections and a bicameral legislature. It was passed with procedural irregularities after fierce debate. In 1954, Rhee again forced an amendment, removing term limits for himself and emphasizing a capitalistic economic model. During the first constitutional amendment made during the Syngman Rhee administration, the National Assembly, the direct election of the president and vice-president, and the National Assembly's no-confidence system to the State Council were established. With the adoption of the direct election system, the National Assembly's authority over the head of the administration decreased rather than the indirect election system, but the non-confidence system of the State Council strengthened the authority that the National Assembly can have over the entire administration. However, at the time of the second constitutional amendment, the restriction on the middle term was abolished only for the first president, and the authority was concentrated on the administration, especially the president. In addition, the abolition of the prime minister system strengthened the president's authority, and the legislative and judicial branches had relatively weaker power than the administration. Due to this revision, the structure of check between the legislature, the judiciary, and the administration, which was aimed at in the first constitution, has weakened.

Rhee was overthrown in 1960 following widespread protests against his increasingly authoritarian rule. Partly in response to Rhee's abuses, the Second Republic turned to a parliamentary system. The 1960 Constitution provided for a figurehead president, a bicameral legislature, a cabinet headed by a prime minister, an election commission, and a constitutional court. It also provided for elections for supreme court justices and provincial governors, as well as natural law-based individual rights. So, after the Syngman Rhee administration, through the constitutional amendment made in the Jang Myeon cabinet, the authority of the enlarged administration was reduced, and the authority of the legislature and judiciary was strengthened. As the previously operated presidential system was converted to the cabinet responsibility system, the authority of the head of the administration was reduced, and the independence of the judiciary was improved as the election of the Supreme Court and the Chief Justice was operated in a direct election. At the same time, the constitutional court, which has jurisdiction over unconstitutional legislative examination and other constitutional affairs, was established, and the structure of the judiciary was expanded.

With the May 16 coup of Park Chung Hee in 1961, the 1960 version was nullified, and in 1962, the Third Republic's Constitution was passed. The document returned to a presidential system. It had a number of similarities to the United States Constitution, such as presidential elections held by the National Assembly in the event of a tie and carrying out judicial review by the ordinary Supreme Court instead of a specialized Constitutional Court, though in practice military government would continue in some form until democratization. In 1972, Park extended his rule with the Fourth Republic's constitution, called the Yushin Constitution, which gave the president sweeping (almost dictatorial) powers and permitted him to run for an unlimited number of six-year terms. In the 5th amendment carried out during the Park Chung-hee regime, the presidential-centered system and the monolithic National Assembly were adopted. This made it possible to quickly process legislation between the legislature and the administration, but since the Park Chung-hee regime seized power through a military coup, collusion between the administration and the legislature was facilitated. In addition, at this time, the structure of the judiciary was partially reduced as the Constitutional Court was abolished and the right to examine unconstitutional laws was transferred to the court. In the 6th amendment that took place afterwards, the continued tenure of the president was extended from the second to the third term, and at the same time, the requirements for impeachment against the president were strengthened. As a result, as in the Syngman Rhee administration, the authority of the administration, especially the president, increased, and at the same time, the authority of the National Assembly was weakened. In addition, in the 7th amendment, the State Council for Unification Subjects was newly established, and the authority of the president was strengthened compared to the 6th amendment, and at the same time, the contents of these powers were also described in the Constitution.

After Park was assassinated in 1979, the Fifth Republic began with the 1980 Constitution under President Chun Doo-hwan. The president's powers were curbed somewhat. He was limited to a single seven-year term, with no possibility of reelection. As with the Yushin Constitution, it provided for a presidential electoral college and a semi-presidential system of government. Critically, however, the President retained the right to suspend civil liberties and rule by decree. During the Chun Doo-hwan administration, the 8th amendment was made. First, the tenure of the president, which was previously extended to three terms, was reduced to a single term of 7 years, and the president's authority was relatively reduced compared to the Park Chung-hee administration. In addition, the National Assembly was given the right to investigate the state affairs, and the power of the legislature was partially strengthened.

With the pro-democratic protests of 1987 (June Democracy Movement), the 1988 Constitution of the Sixth Republic was passed. The constitutional bill was passed by the National Assembly on 12 October 1987, and approved by 93 percent in a national referendum on 28 October, taking effect on 25 February 1988, when Roh Tae-Woo was inaugurated as president. The president's powers were curtailed and the constitutional court was restored. During the Roh Tae-woo administration, the 9th amendment that took place afterwards occurred. At this time, the president's term of office was set to a single five-year term, and the president's authority was reduced compared to the previous regime. In addition, the right to dissolve the National Assembly and take emergency measures that the president held was abolished, and the re-establishment of the Constitutional Court, which disappeared during the Park Chung-hee administration, reduced the authority of the enlarged administration, expanded the structure of the judiciary, and laid the foundation for a balance between legislation, administration, and the judiciary.

Since then, discussions on constitutional amendment have been conducted during the Kim Moon Jae In administration, which took power after Kim Young-sam, Kim Kim Dae Jung, Kim Roh Moo Hyun, and Kim Park Geun Hye administrations. At that time, President Moon Jae In proposed a constitutional amendment on 26 March 2018, and the main contents include 'related to the full text of the constitution and basic rights', 'related to decentralization and economy', and 'related to the form of government and the election system'. According to the related media report BBC NEWS KOREA (2018.03.19.), "Does the preamble of the constitution specify the spirit of the democratization movement?", "Do you want to exclude 'national security' among the reasons for restricting the basic rights of the people?" and "Do you want to clarify that the Republic of Korea aims to become a decentralized state in the constitution?" and "Will the subject of rights be changed from 'people' to 'people?' and "To what extent will the president's term of office be limited/extended?" and "How will the public concept of land be embodied?" It seems that the main issues were 'inheritance of the spirit of the April 19 Revolution and 5.18 Gwangju Democratic Uprising', 'new capital provisions', 'expansion of the subject of basic rights', 'new right to life', and 'new information basic rights'. Among them, the part that newly established the national recall system and the national initiative system is seen as an intention to check the authority of lawmakers to some extent. In addition, this amendment had a provision to change the president's term from a single five-year term to a four-year two-term system, which left room for the president's term to be extended, while the president's amnesty right was reduced, which can be seen as reducing the president's authority in some areas. However, such amendments were not passed by the National Assembly, and the constitutional amendment was canceled.

Amendments of the Constitution of the Republic of Korea
No.	Year	Date	Amendment	Also known as	Ratified by		Promulgated by
—N/a	1948	Jul 17	Established	Constitution of the 1st Republic	Constituent National Assembly	—N/a	Speaker of the National Assembly — Rhee Syngman
1st	1952	Jul 7	Partial		2nd National Assembly	—N/a	President — Rhee Syngman
2nd	1954	Nov 29	Partial		3rd National Assembly	—N/a	President — Rhee Syngman
3rd	1960	Jun 15	Partial	Constitution of the 2nd Republic	4th National Assembly	—N/a	Acting President — Ho Chong, Speaker of the National Assembly — Kwak Sang-hoon
4th	1960	Nov 29	Partial		5th National Assembly	—N/a	President — Yun Po-sun
5th	1962	Dec 26	Whole	Constitution of the 3rd Republic	Supreme Council for National Reconstruction	1st constitutional referendum	Speaker of the Supreme Council for National Reconstruction — Park Chung Hee
6th	1969	Oct 21	Partial		7th National Assembly	2nd constitutional referendum	President — Park Chung Hee
7th	1972	Dec 27	Whole	Constitution of the 4th Republic, Restoration (Yushin) Constitution	State Council	3rd constitutional referendum	President — Park Chung Hee
8th	1980	Oct 27	Whole	Constitution of the 5th Republic	Special Committee for National Security Measures, State Council	5th constitutional referendum	President — Chun Doo-hwan
9th	1987	Oct 29	Whole	Constitution of the 6th Republic, Current Constitution	12th National Assembly	6th constitutional referendum	President — Chun Doo-hwan

== Succession of spirit ==
The spirit of April Nineteenth and March First Movement is stipulated in the preamble of the Constitution of South Korea. However, it took a long time to be established. The contents of the April Revolution were removed on the fifth amendment, and these were included in the preamble on the sixth amendment, identified with May 16 coup. After the ninth amendment, the spirit of the April Revolution was excepted from the preamble, and it was included for the "Resistance ideology for protection of democratic constitution" on the 9th amendment.

We, the people of Korea, proud of a resplendent history and traditions dating from time immemorial, upholding the cause of the Provisional Republic of Korea Government born of the March First Independence Movement of 1919 and the democratic ideals of the April Nineteenth Uprising of 1960 against injustice, having assumed the mission of democratic reform and peaceful unification of our homeland and having determined to consolidate national unity with justice.

— Preamble to the contemporary Constitution of South Korea (9th Constitution, 9th amendment)

== Structure ==
Consisting of a preamble, 130 articles, and supplementary provisions, the Constitution provides for an executive branch headed by a president and an appointed prime minister, a unicameral legislature known as a national assembly, and a judiciary consisting of a constitutional court, supreme court and lower courts.

In detail, the Constitution is composed of ten Chapters. Chapter I provides general constitutional ground for the Republic of Korea itself and citizens. Chapter II provides basic rights for individuals. Other following Chapters from III to VII describe constitutional institutions constituting national governance structure of the Republic of Korea; for example, parliament as the National Assembly (Chapter III), executive branch as the President and the Prime Minister (Chapter IV), ordinary courts and military courts including the Supreme Court of Korea (Chapter V), constitutional court as Constitutional Court of Korea (Chapter VI), independent electoral management institution as the National Election Commission (Chapter VII). Also, Chapter VIII provides constitutional ground for local governments and their autonomy. Chapter IX address general provisions for economic system of the Republic of Korea. Finally, Chapter X stipulates procedure for amendment on the Constitution.

The President is elected by a first-past-the-post voting system and limited to a single five-year term. The Prime Minister is appointed by the President with the consent of the National Assembly. The President also appoints members of the State Council, the Cabinet, on the advice of the Prime Minister, as well as Cabinet Ministers on the advice of the Prime Minister from among the members of the State Council.

The National Assembly consists of at least 200 (presently 300) members elected to four-year terms. The Supreme Court's chief justice and President of the Constitutional Court are appointed by the President of South Korea with consent of the National Assembly. Supreme Court Justices other than the Chief Justice (exact number is set by statute) are appointed by the President of South Korea on the recommendation of the chief justice with the approval of the National Assembly. Also, Constitutional Court Justices other than the President of the Court are appointed by the President of South Korea upon nomination of equal portions from the National Assembly, the Supreme Court Chief Justice and themselves. The President of the Constitutional Court of South Korea serves a six-year term.

The Constitution declares South Korea a "democratic republic" (took from Article 1 of Constitutional Charter of the Provisional Government of the Republic of Korea of 1919), its territory consisting of "the Korean Peninsula and its adjacent islands," and that "The Republic of Korea shall seek unification and shall formulate and carry out a policy of peaceful unification based on the principles of freedom and democracy." There are disputes over what "freedom and democracy" are in Korean, but the direct translation of the Korean word used in the constitution "Korean: 자유민주적 기본질서" would be liberal democracy.

=== Individual rights ===
South Korean Bill of Rights (or fundamental right) is Constitution CHAPTER 2. RIGHTS AND DUTIES OF CITIZENS (4–687) Individuals may not be punished, placed under preventive restrictions, or subjected to involuntary labor except as provided by law. Those detained or arrested must be informed of the reason and of their right to an attorney, and family members must be informed. Warrants must be issued by a judge "through due procedures," and accused persons may sue for wrongful arrest in certain cases.

=== Economic provisions ===
In Article 119, stable and balanced growth rates, "proper distribution of income", and preventing "abuse of economic power" are explicitly listed as goals of the government. The regulatory goal to "democratize the economy through harmony among economic agents" in the same article reflects the strong prevalence of traditional Korean values and the close relationship between politics and the economy. Article 125 designates foreign trade as a strategic area to be fostered, regulated and coordinated by the government. The Constitution affirms both the right and the duty to work, requiring regulation of minimum wages and working conditions. Workers have the right to independent association, collective bargaining, and collective action.

== Political neutrality ==
Political neutrality is a constitutional convention which provides that public servants should avoid activities likely to impair, or seem to impair, their political impartiality or the political impartiality of the public service. The political neutrality of South Korea's Constitution is guaranteed in the area of military, administration, and education. In the form of the guarantee of 'political neutrality', the constitution provides an objective legal system to guarantee political neutrality as an essential element of the system, unlike the form of guarantee of basic rights.

=== Military ===
Article 5 (2) of the Constitution stipulates that "the ROK military shall fulfill the sacred duty of national security and defense of the nation, and its political neutrality shall be obeyed" .

=== Education ===
Education promotes the potential of individuals so that individuals can develop their personality in each area of life. In view of the important functions of education, Article 31(6) of the Constitution stipulates to specify in the law about the basic laws and regulations about the education system and its operation, education finances and the status of teachers.

=== Administration ===
Political neutrality of public officials is specified in the law. Article 6(2) of the Constitution stipulates that "The status and political neutrality of public officials shall be guaranteed by law". Also, Article 9(1) of the Public Service Elections act regulates that Public servants or any other person (including any organization or organizations) that is required to be in a political neutrality shall not engage in any unfair influence on the election or otherwise act on the election results. Article 65 of the Public Officials Act (Prohibition of Political Movement) Section 2 regulates that Public officials shall not engage in the following activities to support or oppose a specific political party or a particular person in an election. 1. To make an invitation to vote or not 2. Pray, preside, or recommend the signatory movement. 3. To publish or post documents or books to public facilities 4. To make a donation recruitment, or to use public funds 5. To encourage others to join or not to join a political party or other political organizations

== Constitutional Court ==
Following the 1987 revision, the Constitutional Court was established in September 1988 by Chapter VI of the Constitution. Though earlier versions of the Constitution provided for various forms of judicial review, the judiciary's lack of independence at the time prevented it from exercising this function. This historical background led drafters of current Constitution of South Korea to greatly empower the Constitutional Court.

Current status of the Constitutional Court allows it to recognized some unwritten yet enforceable constitutional laws by decision of the Court. Most prominent example of such unwritten constitution is customary constitution, identifying Seoul as sole national capital city.

=== Related articles of the Constitution ===
Articles 111 through 113 of the Constitution of the Republic of Korea refer to the Constitutional Court.

- Article 111 : This article stipulates the enforcement of the Constitutional Court and the qualifications and appointments of the Constitutional Court Judges.
  - Article 111(1) : Paragraph (1) of Article 111 sets the Court's jurisdiction, as Judicial review on constitutionality of statute, review of all Impeachments, decision on Prohibition and Dissolution of political parties, competence dispute about demarcation of power among central government agencies and local governments, and adjudication of constitutional complaint. For more information, see jurisdiction.
  - Article 111(2), (3) : Paragraph (2) and (3) of Article 111 sets qualification and appointment process of Justices of the Court. Number of Constitutional Court Justices are exactly stipulated as nine, according to paragraph (2) of Article 111. For more information, see Justices of the Court.
  - Article 111(4) : This paragraph sets appointment process for the President of the Court. For more information, see the President of the Constitutional Court of Korea.
- Article 112 : This article stipulates term and ethical obligations of Constitutional Court Justices and guarantee of their status.
  - Article 112(1) : Paragraph (1) sets term of the Constitutional Court Justices as renewable six years.
  - Article 112(2) : Paragraph (2) specifies ethical obligations of the Constitutional Court Justices. To protect political neutrality, they should not join any political party, nor shall participate in political activities.
  - Article 112(3) : Paragraph (3) guarantees that Constitutional Court Justices cannot be removed at will from their office. Unlike Justices at the Supreme Court of Korea, Constitutional Court Justices enjoy more reinforced guarantee of status since they cannot be ordered to retire due to unbearable mental or physical impairment. For more information, see article 106(2) of the Constitution and the tenure of Supreme Court Justices.
- Article 113 : This article provides constitutional ground for quorum and organizational autonomy of the Court.
  - Article 113(1) : According to the paragraph (1) of the article, to make decision upholding requests for the Adjudication, or to change precedent, the Court needs votes from at least six Justices among quorum of at least seven Justices. For more information, see Quorum of the Court.
  - Article 113(2) : This paragraph empowers the Court to enact sub statutory rules for internal issues, including specific process of adjudication and other organizational issues inside the Court. As one of highest constitutional institution of South Korea, the Court enjoys organization autonomy from other constitutional institutions.
  - Article 113(3) : This paragraph is constitutional ground for statute called 'Constitutional Court Act', which regulates and specifies exact boundary of jurisdiction, autonomy and power of the Court.

== See also ==
- History of South Korea
- Elections in South Korea
- Government of South Korea
- Constitutional Court of Korea
- List of national constitutions
