= 1980 South Korean constitutional referendum =

22 October 1980

Results
Choice	Votes	%
Yes	17,829,354	92.92%
No	1,357,673	7.08%
Valid votes	19,187,027	98.63%
Invalid or blank votes	266,899	1.37%
Total votes	19,453,926	100.00%
Registered voters/turnout	20,373,869	95.48%

A constitutional referendum was held in South Korea on 22 October 1980. The changes to the constitution were approved by 91.6% of voters, with a turnout of 95.5%.

== Results ==
Choice	Votes	%
For	17,829,354	91.6
Against	1,357,673	8.4
Invalid/blank votes	266,899	–
Total	19,453,926	100
Registered voters/turnout	20,373,869	95.5
Source: Nohlen et al.
