= 1987 South Korean constitutional referendum =

- 28 October 1987
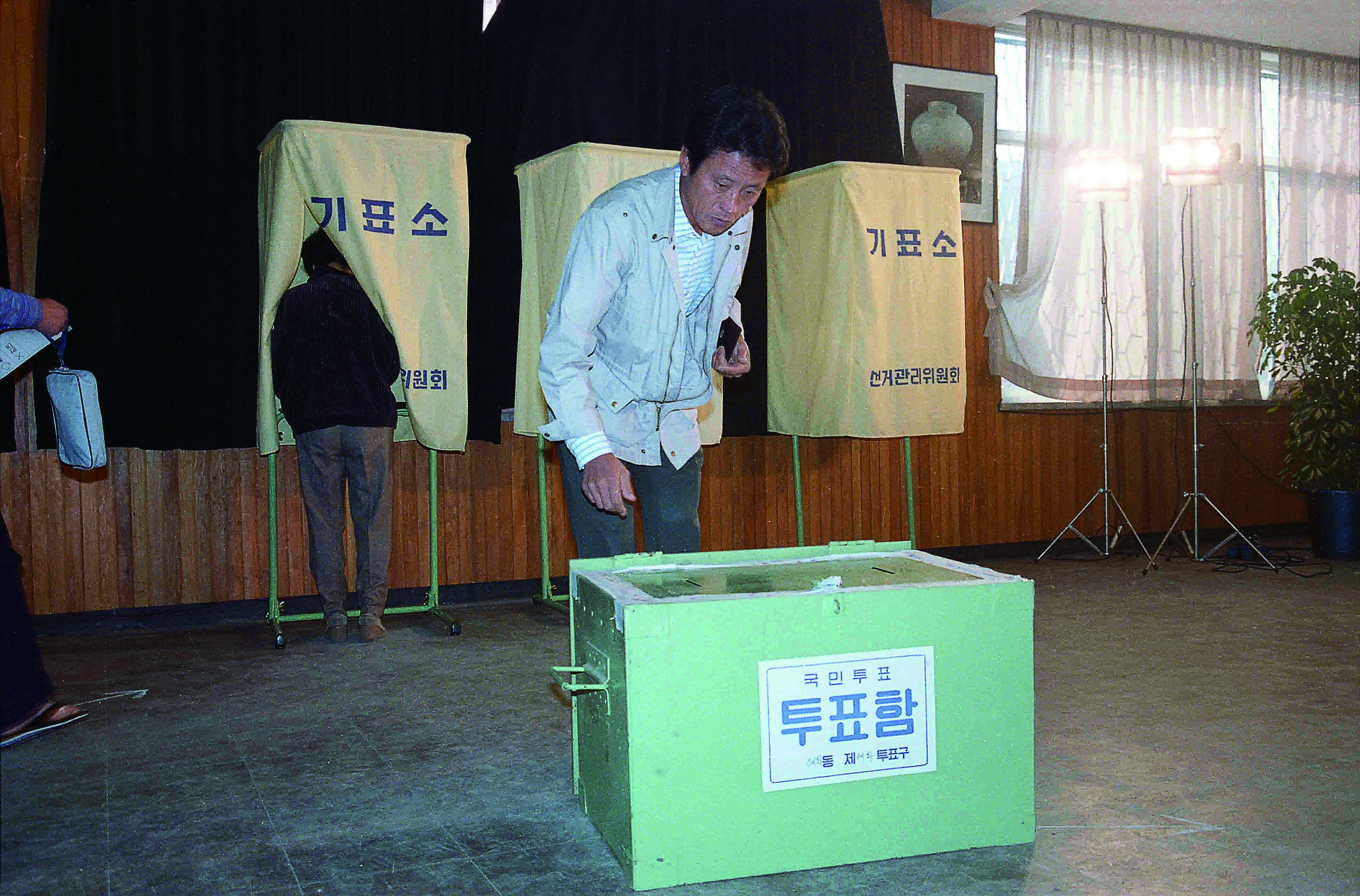
- Voting in the referendum

Results
Choice	Votes	%
Yes	18,640,625	94.46%
No	1,092,702	5.54%
Valid votes	19,733,327	98.53%
Invalid or blank votes	295,345	1.47%
Total votes	20,028,672	100.00%
Registered voters/turnout	25,619,648	78.18%

A constitutional referendum was held in South Korea on 28 October 1987. The changes to the constitution were approved by 94% of voters, with a turnout of 78%. The changes reduced the power of the South Korean president and re-established the constitutional court.

== Results ==
Choice	Votes	%
For	18,640,625	94.46
Against	1,092,702	5.54
Total	19,733,327	100.00
Valid votes	19,733,327	98.53
Invalid/blank votes	295,345	1.47
Total votes	20,028,672	100.00
Registered voters/turnout	25,619,648	78.18
Source: Nohlen et al.
